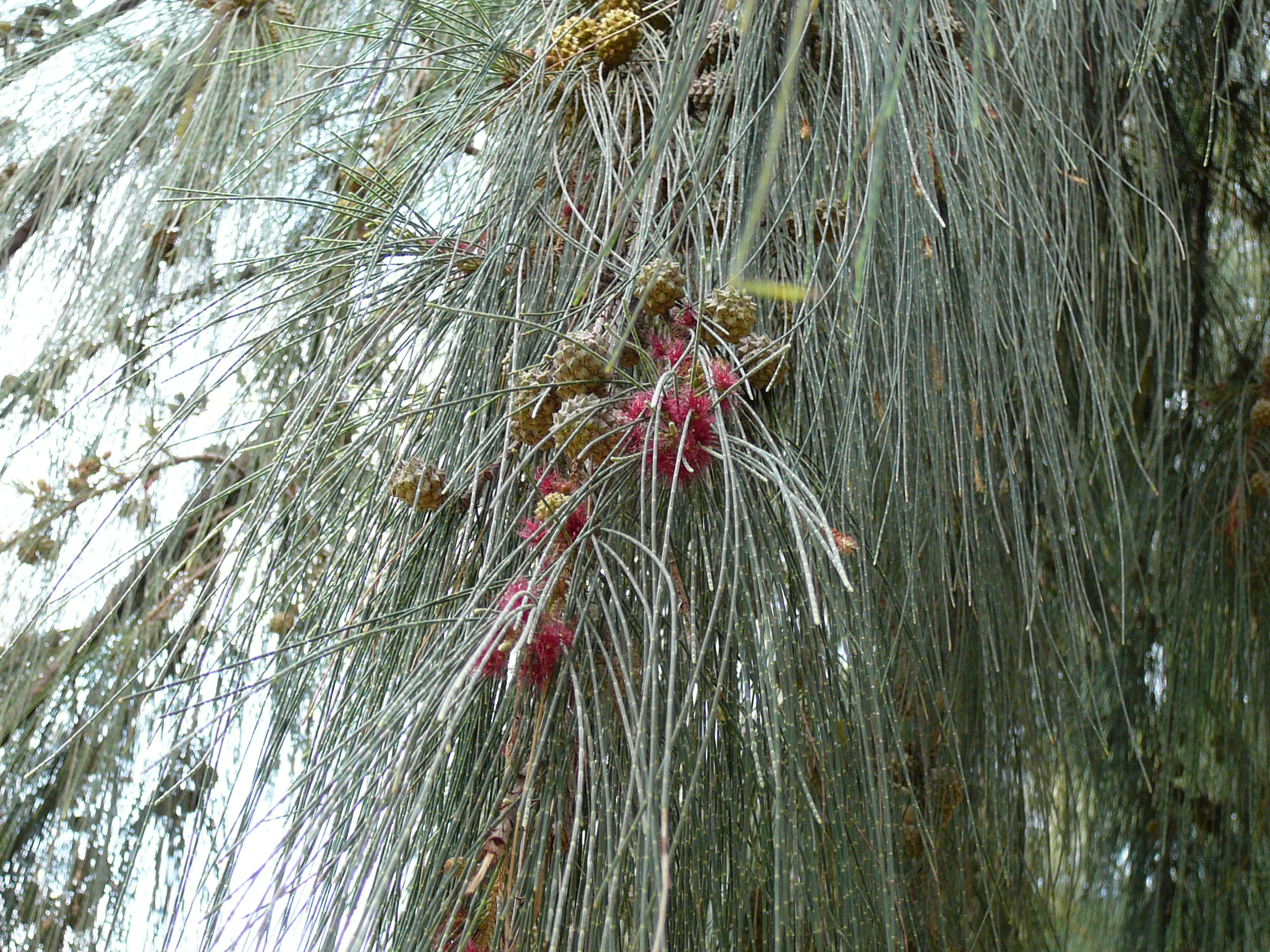
- Casuarina equisetifolia, showing red female flowers and mature fruits

Scientific classification
- Kingdom: Plantae
- Clade: Embryophytes
- Clade: Tracheophytes
- Clade: Spermatophytes
- Clade: Angiosperms
- Clade: Eudicots
- Clade: Rosids
- Order: Fagales
- Family: Casuarinaceae
- Genus: Casuarina; L.

Type species
- Casuarina equisetifolia L.

Species
- See text

= Casuarina =

Genus of trees

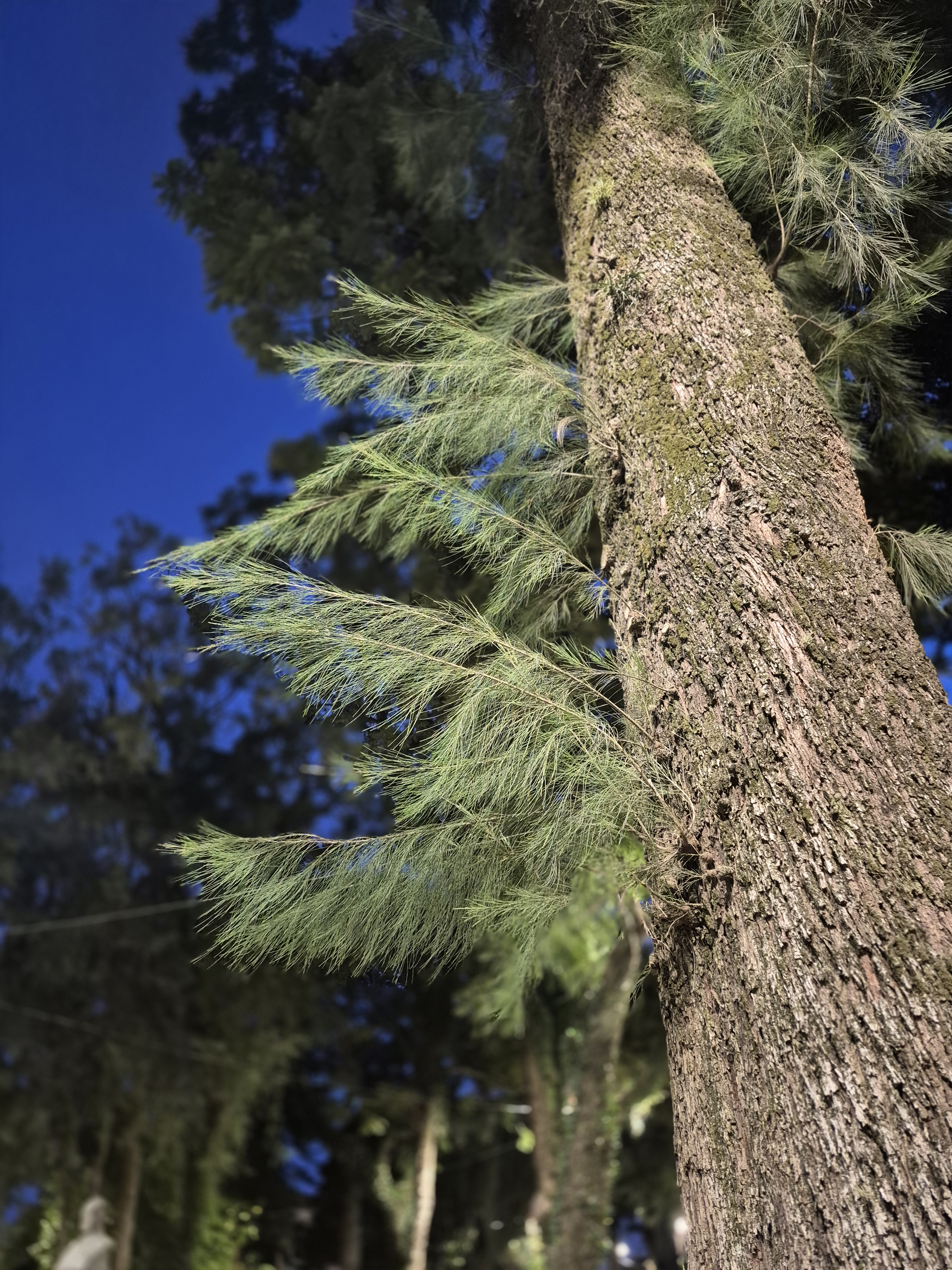
C. equisetifolia Bark and leaf-alike branchlets.

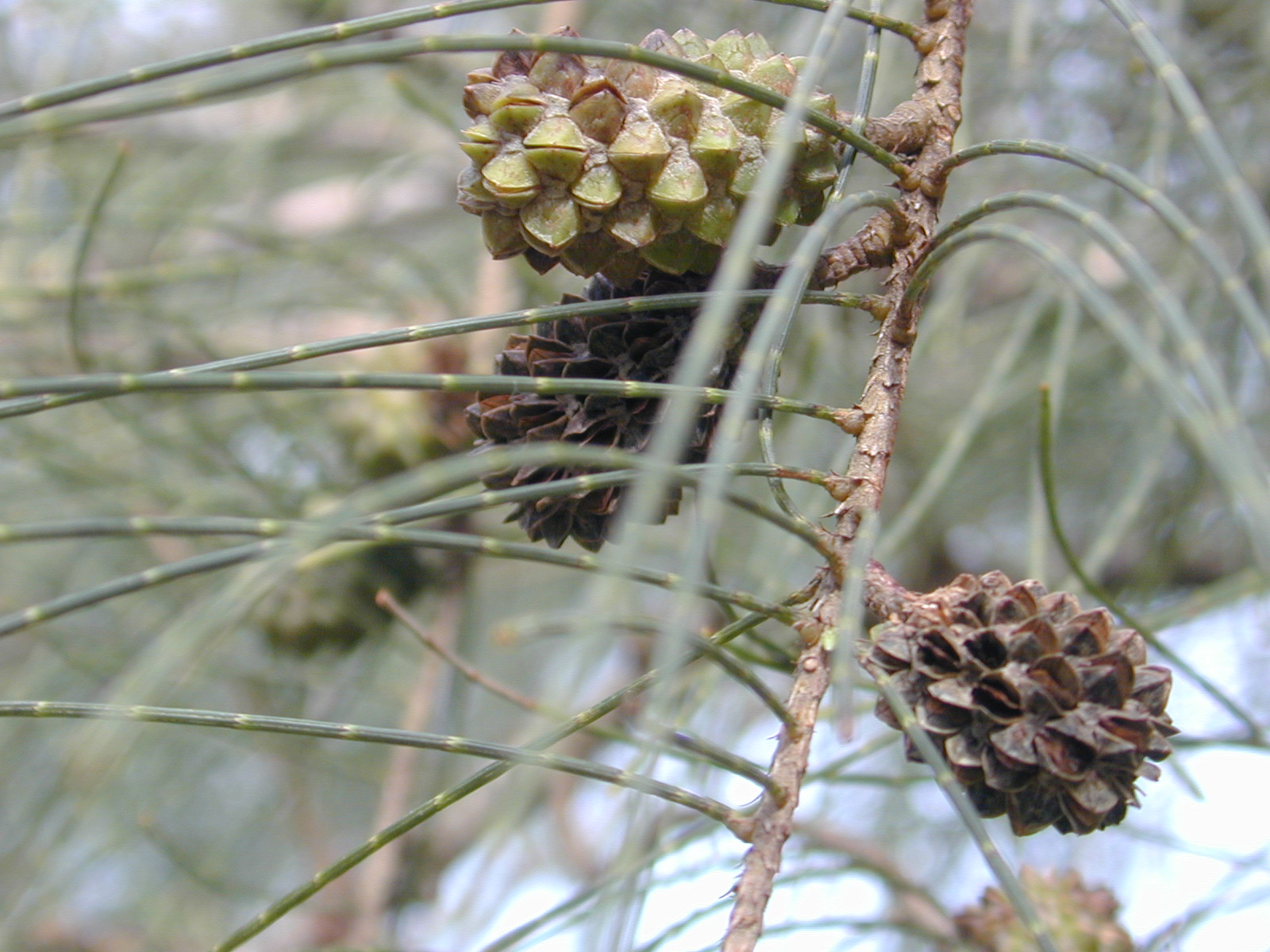
Female cones of C. equisetifolia

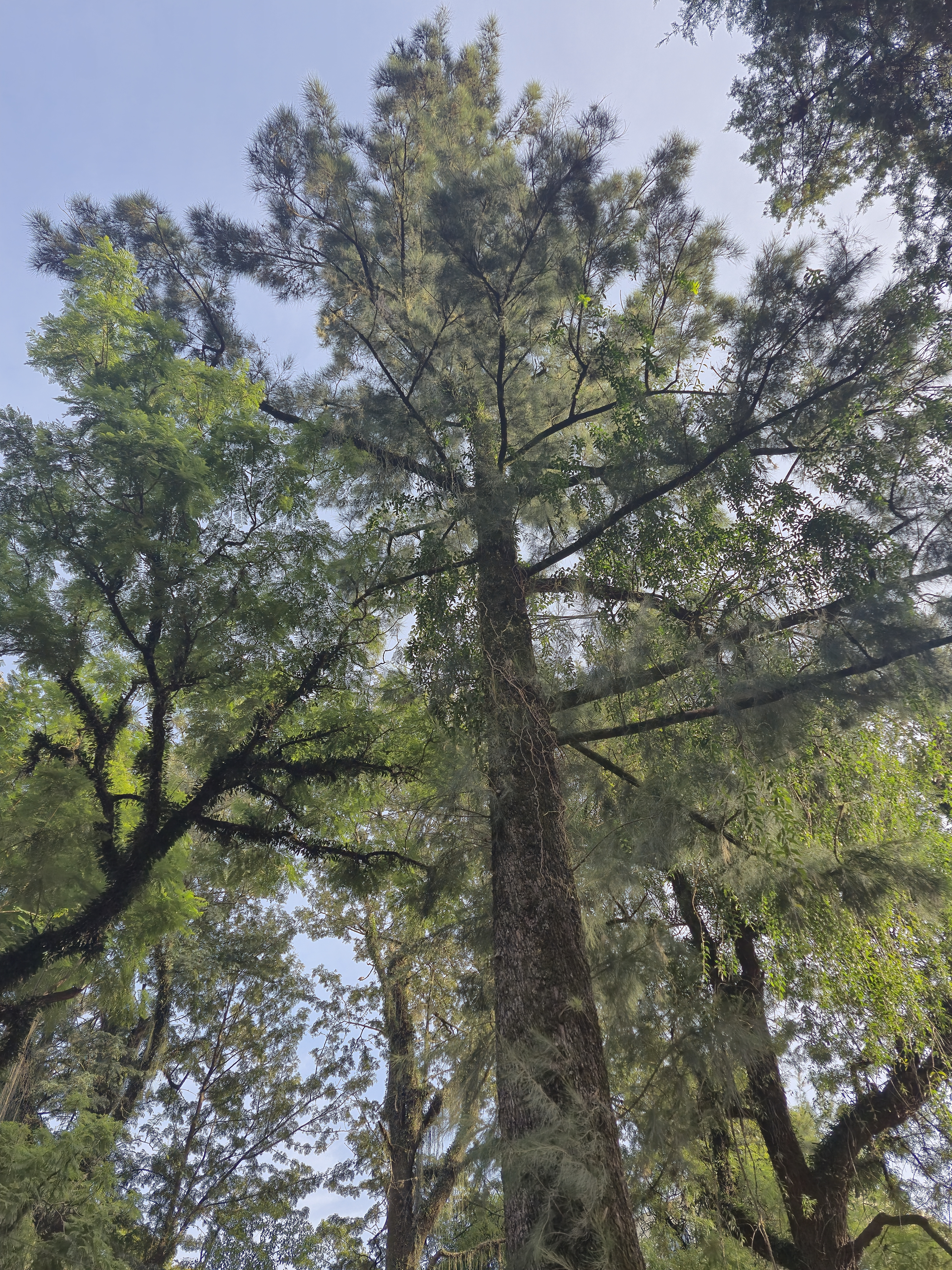
C. equisetifolia: habitus in Brazil

Casuarina, also known as she-oak, Australian pine and native pine, is a genus of flowering plants in the family Casuarinaceae, and is native to Australia, the Indian subcontinent, Southeast Asia, islands of the western Pacific Ocean, and eastern Africa.

Plants in the genus Casuarina are monoecious or dioecious trees with green, pendulous, photosynthetic branchlets, the leaves reduced to small scales arranged in whorls around the branchlets, the male and female flowers arranged in separate spikes, the fruit a cone containing grey or yellowish-brown winged seeds.

== Description ==
Plants in the genus Casuarina are dioecious trees (apart from C. equisetifolia that is monoecious), with fissured or scaly greyish-brown to black bark. They have soft, pendulous, green, photosynthetic branchlets, the leaves reduced to scale-like leaves arranged in whorls of 5 to 20 around the branchlets. The branchlets are segmented at each whorl with deep furrows that conceal the stomates. Male flowers are arranged along branchlets in spikes with persistent bracteoles, female flowers in spikes on short side-branches (effectively "peduncles") that differ in appearance from vegetative branchlets. After fertilisation, the female spikes develop into "cones" with thin, woody bracteoles that extend well beyond the cone body. The cones enclose grey or yellowish-brown winged seed known as samaras.

== Ecology ==
Casuarina are attacked by a range of herbivorous insects.

- Hymenoptera: The wasps Bootanelleus orientalis and another Bootanelleus species (Torymidae) feed on seeds. Selitrichodes casuarinae and S. utilis (Eulophidae) induce galls.
- Lepidoptera: Most lepidopteran herbivores are in the family Oecophoridae. Zauclophora pelodes, Araeostoma aenicta and Lichenaula sp. feed on leaves, and the latter two are also leaf tiers. Cryptophasa irrorata bores in branches and stems. Outside of Oecophoridae, there are fruit- and leaf-feeders in families Carposinidae and Gelechiidae.
- Curculionidae: A weevil in genus Haplonyx feeds on cones. The genera Misophrice and Apion have also been recorded on Casuarina, but the nature of their associations is unknown.
- Hemiptera: Casuarinicola jumping plant lice (Triozidae) feed on sap of Casuarina. Another hemipteran associated with this genus is the felt scale Choneochiton casuarinae (Eriococcidae).
- Diptera: The gall midge Ophelmodiplosis clavata (Cecidomyiidae) induces galls on branchlet tips.

== Taxonomy ==
The genus Casuarina was first formally described in 1759 by Carl Linnaeus in Amoenitates Academicae and the first species he described (the type species) was Casuarina equisetifolia. The generic name is derived from the Malay word for the cassowary, kasuari, alluding to the similarities between the bird's feathers and the plant's foliage.

=== Species List ===
The following is a list of Casuarina species accepted by Plants of the World Online as of April 2023:

- Casuarina collina Poiss. ex Pancher & Sebert (New Caledonia)
- Casuarina cristata Miq. – belah, muurrgu (Qld., N.S.W.).
- Casuarina cunninghamiana Miq. – river oak, river sheoak, creek oak (Qld., N.S.W., A.C.T., N.T.)
- Casuarina equisetifolia L. – coastal she-oak, horsetail she-oak (South Asia, Southeast Asia, Australia)
- Casuarina glauca Sieber ex Spreng. – swamp she-oak, swamp buloke, marsh sheoak (Qld., N.S.W.)
- Casuarina grandis L.A.S.Johnson (New Guinea)
- Casuarina junghuhniana Miq. (Indonesia)
- Casuarina obesa Miq. – swamp she-oak, swamp oak, western swamp oak (W.A., S.A., Vic., N.S.W.)
- Casuarina oligodon L.A.S.Johnson (New Guinea)
- Casuarina orophila L.A.S.Johnson (New Guinea)
- Casuarina pauper F.Muell. ex L.A.S.Johnson – black oak, belah, kariku (W.A., S.A., Qld., N.S.W., Vic.)
- Casuarina potamophila Schltr. (New Caledonia)
- Casuarina tenella Schltr. (New Caledonia)
- Casuarina teres Schltr. (New Caledonia)

In 1982, Lawrence Johnson raised the genera Allocasuarina and Gymnostoma in the Journal of the Adelaide Botanic Gardens, and transferred some species previously included in Casuarina to the new genera. The species of Allocasuarina previously in Casuarina are: A. acuaria, A. acutivalvis, A. campestris, A. corniculata, A. decaisneana, A. decussata, A. dielsiana, A. distyla, A. drummondiana, A. drummondiana, A. fraseriana, A. grevilleoides, A. helmsii, A. huegeliana, A. humilis, A. inophloia, A. lehmanniana subsp. lehmanniana, A. littoralis, A. luehmannii, A. microstachya, A. monilifera, A. muelleriana, A. nana, A. paludosa, A. paradoxa, A. pinaster, A. pusilla, A. ramosissima, A. rigida, A. robusta, A. striata, A. tessellata, A. thuyoides, A. torulosa, A. trichodon and A. verticillata. The species of Gymnostoma previously included in Casuarina are G. chamaecyparis, G. deplancheanum, G. intermedium, G. leucodon, G. nobile, G. nodiflorum, G. papuanum, G. poissonianum, G. rumphianum and G. sumatranum and G. webbianum.

=== Invasive species ===
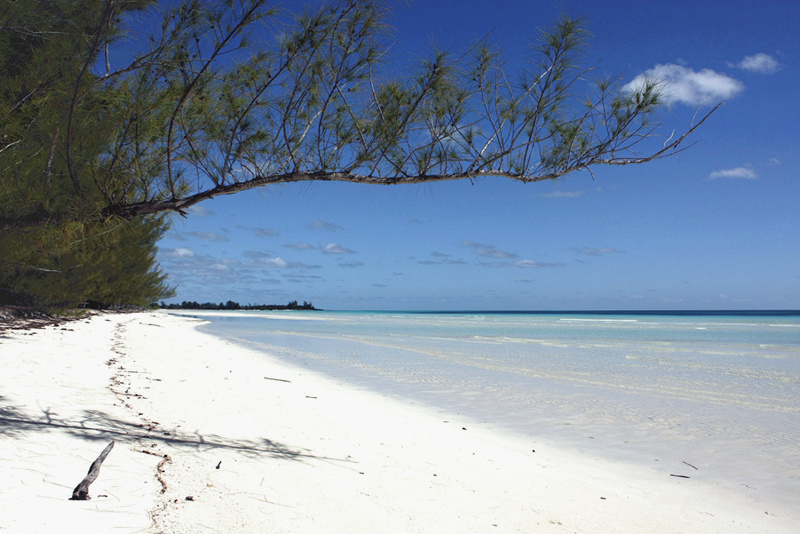
Casuarina on Gold Rock Beach, Grand Bahama

C. cunninghamiana, C. glauca and C. equisetifolia have become naturalized in many countries, including Argentina, Bermuda, Cayman Islands, Cuba, China, Egypt, Israel, Iraq, Mauritius, Kenya, Mexico, Brazil, South Africa, the Bahamas, and Uruguay. They are considered an invasive species in the United States, especially in southern Florida where they have nearly quadrupled in number between 1993 and 2005 and are called the Australian pine. C. equisetifolia is widespread in the Hawaiian Islands where it grows both on the seashore in dry, salty, calcareous soils and up in the mountains in high rainfall areas on volcanic soils. It is also an invasive plant in Bermuda, where it was introduced to replace the Juniperus bermudiana windbreaks killed by a scale insect in the 1940s.
