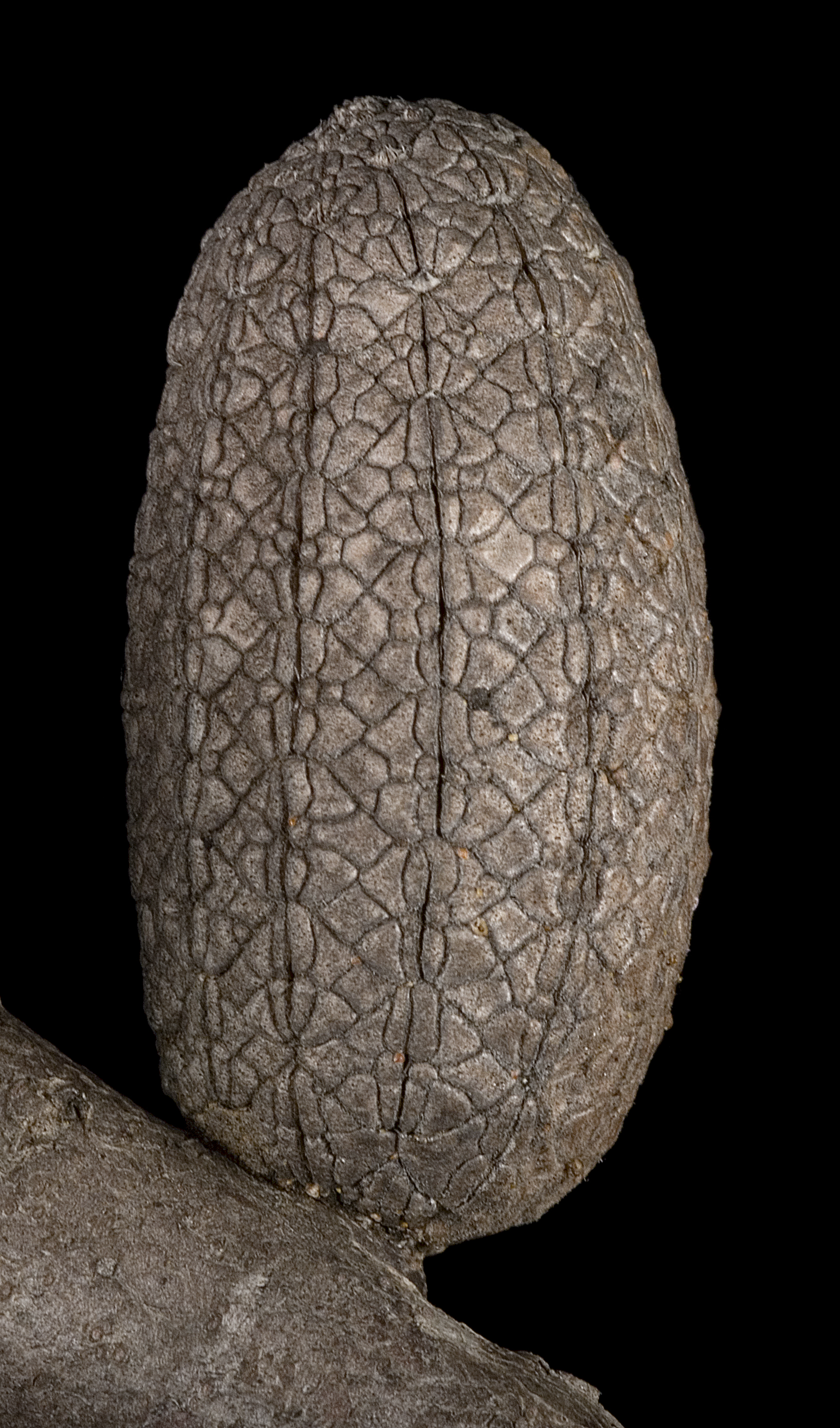
- Mature cone

Scientific classification
- Kingdom: Plantae
- Clade: Tracheophytes
- Clade: Angiosperms
- Clade: Eudicots
- Clade: Rosids
- Order: Fagales
- Family: Casuarinaceae
- Genus: Allocasuarina
- Species: A. helmsii

Binomial name
- Allocasuarina helmsii (Ewart & M. Gordon) L.A.S.Johnson
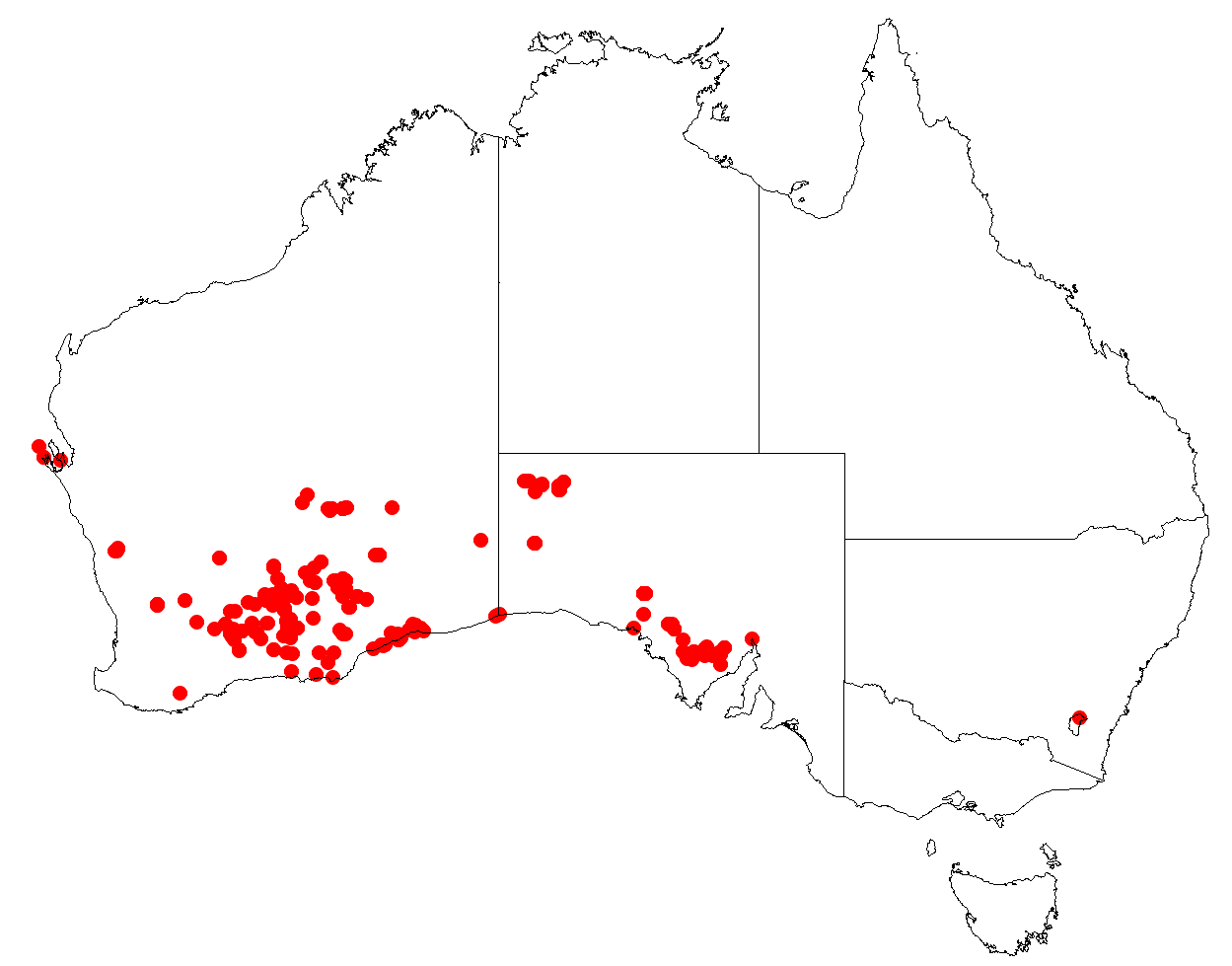
- Occurrence data from AVH

= Allocasuarina helmsii =

Species of flowering plant

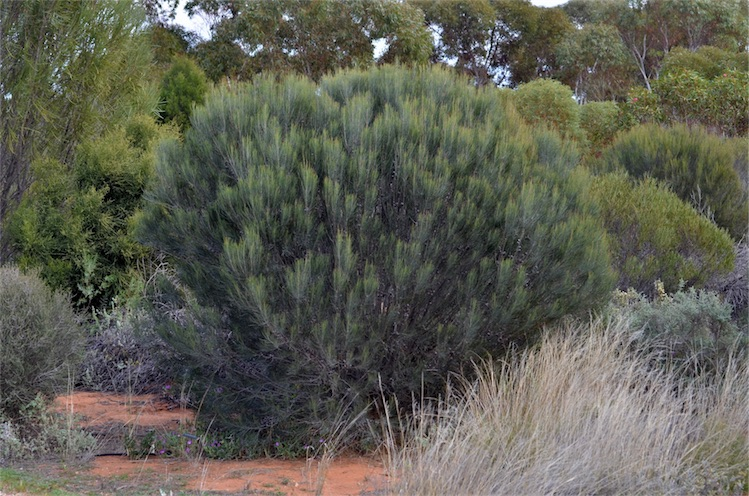
Habit

Allocasuarina helmsii is a species of flowering plant in the family Casuarinaceae and is endemic to the south-western Australia. It is a dioecious shrub that erect branchlets, the leaves reduced to scales in whorls of five or six, and mature fruiting cones 15–33 mm (0.59–1.30 in) long containing winged seeds (samaras) 4–5 mm (0.16–0.20 in) long.

== Description ==
Allocasuarina helmsii is a dioecious shrub that typically grows to a height of 1–5 m (3 ft 3 in – 16 ft 5 in). Its branchlets are erect, up to 160 mm (6.3 in) long, the leaves reduced to erect, scale-like teeth 0.5–0.7 mm (0.020–0.028 in) long, arranged in whorls of five or six around the branchlets. The sections of branchlet between the leaf whorls (the "articles") are 3–7 mm (0.12–0.28 in) long and 0.7–0.9 mm (0.028–0.035 in) wide. Male flowers are arranged in spikes 5–25 mm (0.20–0.98 in) long, the anthers 0.5–0.7 mm (0.020–0.028 in) long. Female cones are usually cylindrical, softly-hairy or rusty-hairy at first, and sessile or on a peduncle up to 4 mm (0.16 in) long. Mature cones are 15–33 mm (0.59–1.30 in) long and 8–13 mm (0.31–0.51 in) in diameter, the samaras mid-brown and 4–5 mm (0.16–0.20 in) long.

== Taxonomy ==
This species was first formally described in 1920 by Alfred James Ewart and M. Gordon who gave it the name Casuarina helmsii in the Proceedings of the Royal Society of Victoria, from specimens collected by Richard Helms near Gnarlbine in 1886. It was reclassified in 1982 as Allocasuarina helmsii by Lawrie Johnson in the Journal of the Adelaide Botanic Gardens. The specific epithet (helmsii) honours the collector of the type specimens.

== Distribution and habitat ==
Allocasuarina helmsii grows in mallee woodland and tall heath between Nungarin in Western Australia, and north-western South Australia, with disjunct populations on Dirk Hartog Island and on the northern Eyre Peninsula.
