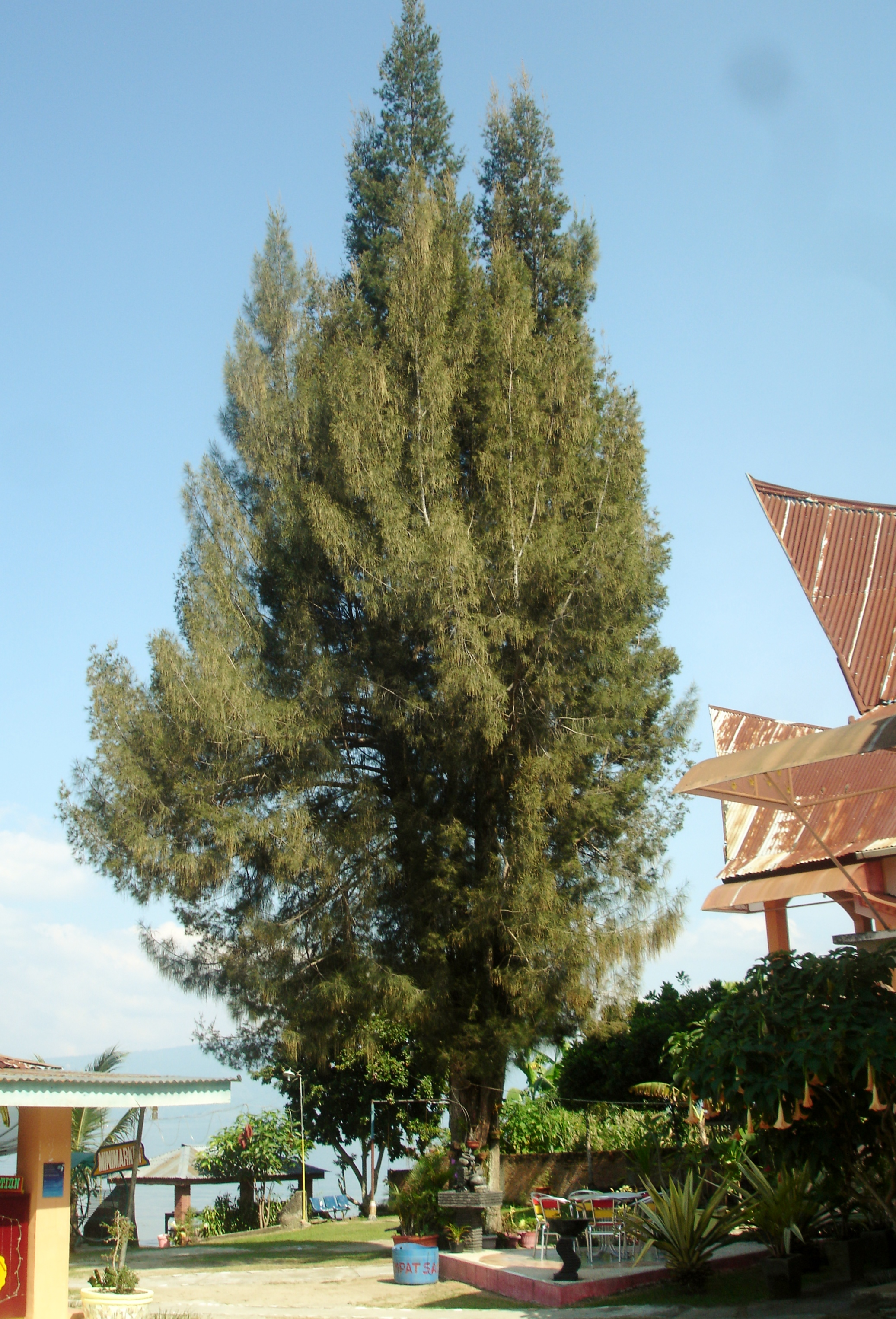
- Casuarina Junghuhniana seen in Ambarita, Samosir

Conservation status
- Least Concern (IUCN 3.1)

Scientific classification
- Kingdom: Plantae
- Clade: Tracheophytes
- Clade: Angiosperms
- Clade: Eudicots
- Clade: Rosids
- Order: Fagales
- Family: Casuarinaceae
- Genus: Casuarina
- Species: C. junghuhniana

Binomial name
- Casuarina junghuhniana Miq.

Subspecies
- C. j. subsp. junghuhniana; C. j. subsp. timorensis

Synonyms
- Casuarina montana Lesch. ex Miq.; Casuarina muricata Roxb. ex Hornem.

= Casuarina junghuhniana =

Species of flowering plant

Casuarina junghuhniana, the mountain ru or red-tipped ru, is a tree in the family Casuarinaceae that originated in Java and the Lesser Sunda Islands. The species has been introduced to Pakistan and Bangladesh.

== Description ==
Casuarina junghuhniana is an evergreen tree growing to 15–35 m (50–115 ft) tall. The foliage consists of slender, much-branched green to grey-green twigs 0.8–1 mm (0.032–0.039 in) diameter, bearing minute scale-leaves in whorls of 9–11. It is dioecious and the flowers are produced in small catkin-like inflorescences. The fruit is an oval woody structure, superficially resembling a conifer cone made up of numerous carpels each containing a single seed with a small wing 4–5 mm (0.16–0.2 in) long. Unlike Casuarina equisetifolia, Mountain Ru (C. junghuhniana) has a narrower canopy, small and neat branches. It has a straight and knotless trunk.

Like some other species of the genus Casuarina, C. junghuhniana is an actinorhizal plant able to fix atmospheric nitrogen. In contrast to species of the plant family Fabaceae (e.g., beans, alfalfa, Acacia), Casuarina harbours a symbiosis with a Frankia actinomycete.

== Taxonomy ==
There are two subspecies:

- Casuarina junghuhniana subsp. junghuhniana distributed in Java, Bali, Lombok, Sumbawa and Flores
- Casuarina junghuhniana subsp. timorensis found in Timor, Wetar, Sumba and Sumbawa

== Distribution and habitat ==
Casuarina junghuhniana is native to Java and the Lesser Sunda Islands. The species has been introduced to Pakistan and Bangladesh as a restoration of degraded forest areas.

== Uses ==
Popularly grown as an ornamental plant and a windproof line. The wood of this tree is used for shingles, fencing, and is said to make excellent hot-burning firewood.
