= Casuarina oligodon =

Scientific classification
- Kingdom: Plantae
- Clade: Tracheophytes
- Clade: Angiosperms
- Clade: Eudicots
- Clade: Rosids
- Order: Fagales
- Family: Casuarinaceae
- Genus: Casuarina
- Species: C. oligodon

Binomial name
- Casuarina oligodon L.A.S.Johnson

Species of plant

Casuarina oligodon, the she oak, is a species of Casuarina tree first described by Lawrence Alexander Sidney Johnson. Casuarina oligodon is part of the genus Casuarina and the family Casuarinaceae. It is dioecious, very rarely monoecious.

== Range ==
She oak is native to Papua New Guinea.
