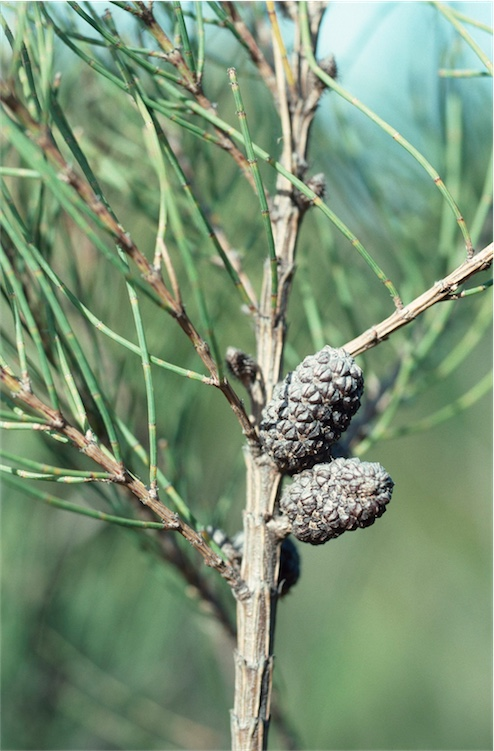
- Mature cones

Scientific classification
- Kingdom: Plantae
- Clade: Tracheophytes
- Clade: Angiosperms
- Clade: Eudicots
- Clade: Rosids
- Order: Fagales
- Family: Casuarinaceae
- Genus: Allocasuarina
- Species: A. paradoxa

Binomial name
- Allocasuarina paradoxa (Macklin) L.A.S.Johnson
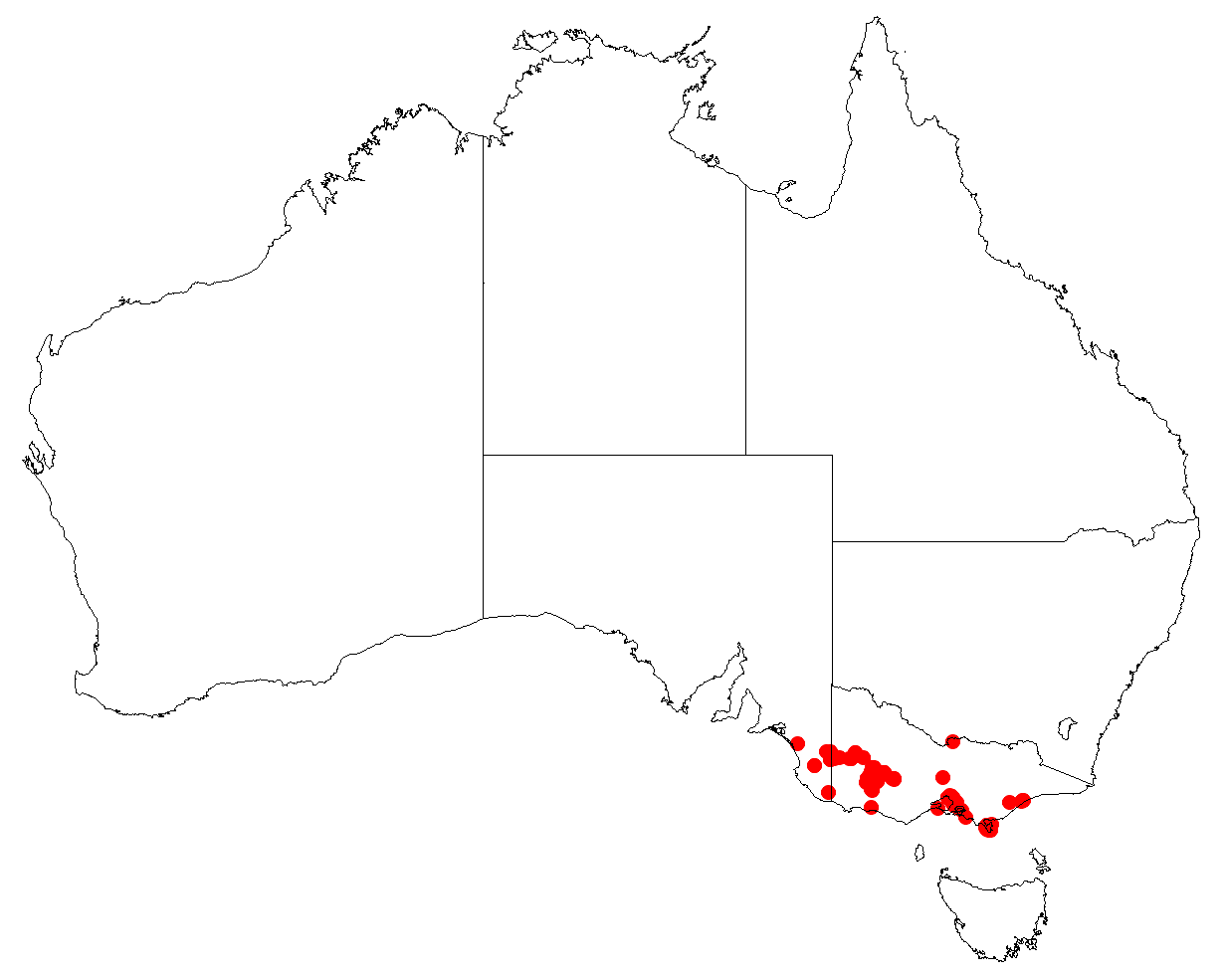
- Occurrence data from AVH

Synonyms
- Casuarina paradoxa Macklin

= Allocasuarina paradoxa =

Species of plant

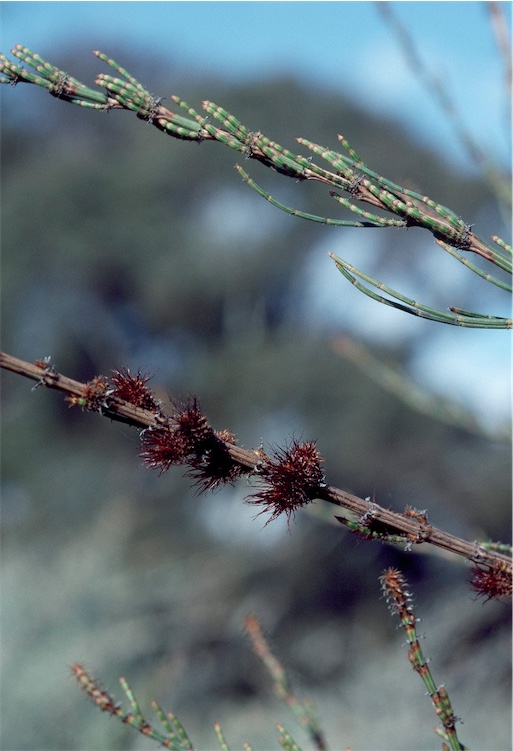
Immature female cones

Allocasuarina paradoxa is a species of flowering plant in the family Casuarinaceae and is endemic to Victoria. It is a dioecious or monoecious shrub that has branchlets up to 150 mm (5.9 in) long, the leaves reduced to scales in whorls of seven to eleven, the fruiting cones 13–25 mm (0.51–0.98 in) long containing winged seeds 4–8 mm (0.16–0.31 in) long.

== Description ==
Allocasuarina paradoxa is a dioecious shrub that typically grows to a height of 1–4 m (3 ft 3 in – 13 ft 1 in) and has smooth bark. Its branchlets are more or less erect, up to 150 mm (5.9 in) long, the leaves reduced to erect to slightly spreading, scale-like teeth 0.4–0.8 mm (0.016–0.031 in) long, arranged in whorls of six or seven around the branchlets. The sections of branchlet between the leaf whorls (the "articles") are 5–12 mm (0.20–0.47 in) long, 0.7–1 mm (0.028–0.039 in) wide and have a waxy covering. Male flowers are arranged in spikes 10–40 mm (0.39–1.57 in) long, the anthers 0.7–0.8 mm (0.028–0.031 in) long. Female cones are cylindrical, on a peduncle 2–6 mm (0.079–0.236 in) long. Mature cones are 13–35 mm (0.51–1.38 in) long and 7–9 mm (0.28–0.35 in) in diameter, the samaras 4.5–5.5 mm (0.18–0.22 in) long.

== Taxonomy ==
This she-oak was first formally described in 1931 by Ellen Dulcie Macklin who gave it the name Casuarina paradoxa in the Kew Bulletin. It was reclassified in 1982 as Allocasuarina paradoxa by Lawrie Johnson in the Journal of the Adelaide Botanic Gardens.

== Distribution and habitat ==
Allocasuarina paradoxa grows in tall heath in the Grampians National Park and between Melbourne and Wilsons Promontory in Victoria.
