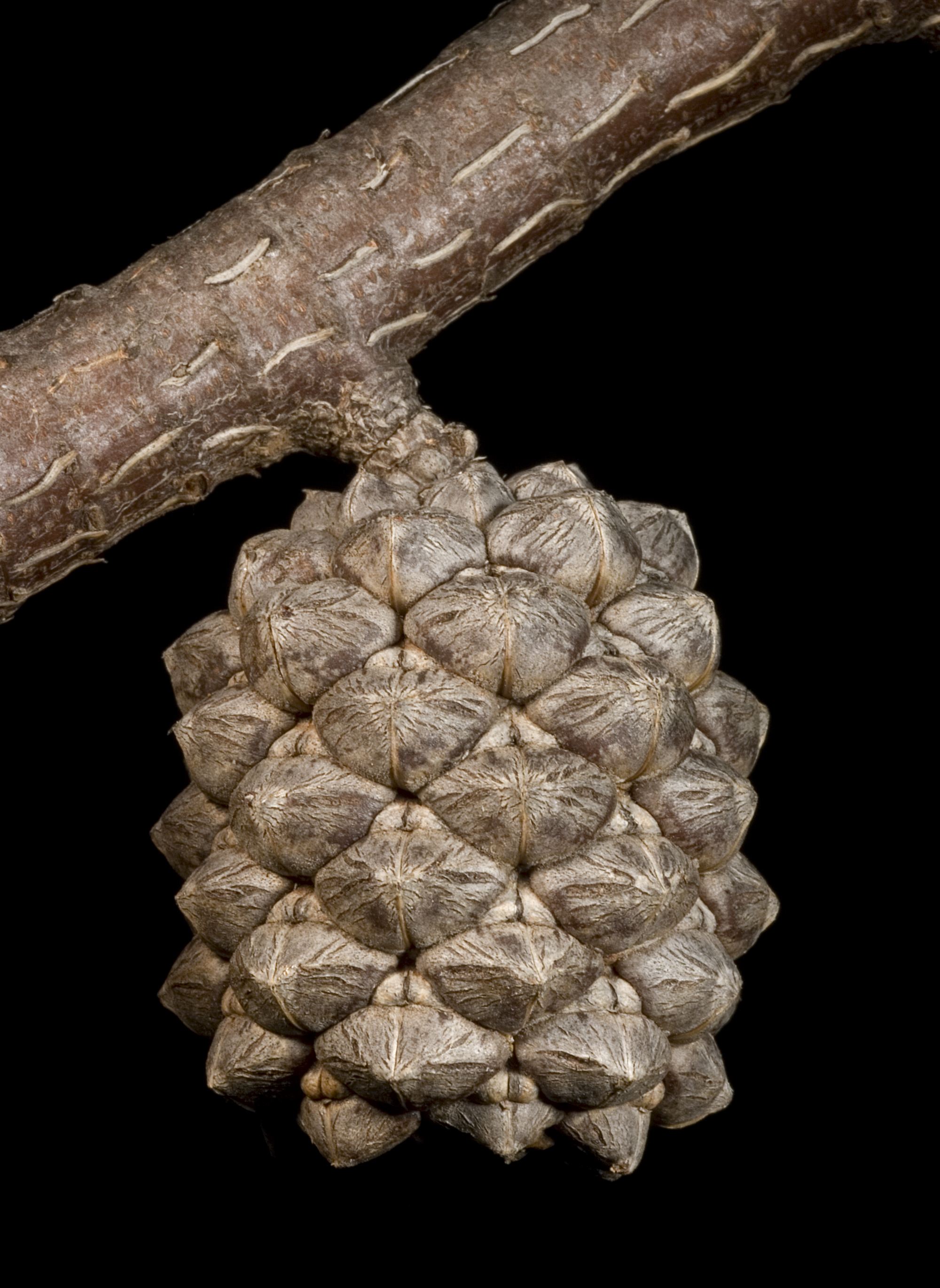

Scientific classification
- Kingdom: Plantae
- Clade: Tracheophytes
- Clade: Angiosperms
- Clade: Eudicots
- Clade: Rosids
- Order: Fagales
- Family: Casuarinaceae
- Genus: Allocasuarina
- Species: A. dielsiana

Binomial name
- Allocasuarina dielsiana (C.A.Gardner) L.A.S.Johnson
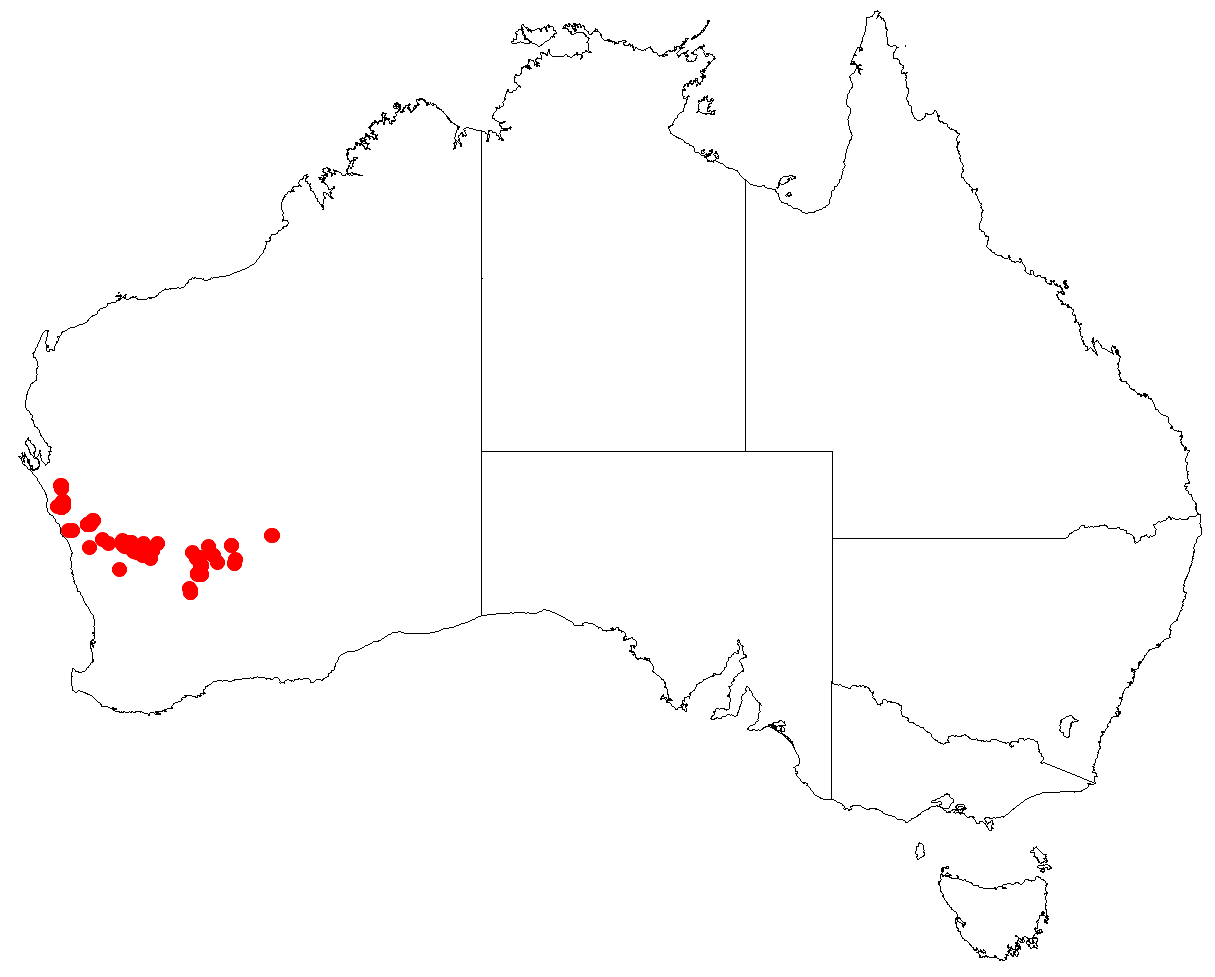
- Occurrence data from AVH

Synonyms
- Casuarina dielsiana C.A.Gardner

= Allocasuarina dielsiana =

Species of flowering plant

Allocasuarina dielsiana, commonly known as northern sheoak, is a species of flowering plant in the family Casuarinaceae and is endemic to the south-west of Western Australia. It is a dioecious tree that has more or less erect branchlets, the leaves reduced to scales in whorls of six to eight, and the mature fruiting cones 14–30 mm (0.55–1.18 in) long containing winged seeds (samaras) 8–10 mm (0.31–0.39 in) long.

== Description ==
Allocasuarina dielsiana is usually a dioecious tree that typically grows to a height of 4–9 m (13–30 ft). Its branchlets are more or less erect, up to 200 mm (7.9 in) long, the leaves reduced to scale-like teeth 0.5–0.7 mm (0.020–0.028 in) long, arranged in whorls of six to eight around the branchlets. The sections of branchlet between the leaf whorls (the "articles") are 6–10 mm (0.24–0.39 in) long and 0.8–1.0 mm (0.031–0.039 in) wide. Male flowers are arranged in spikes 5–6 mm (0.20–0.24 in) long, the anthers 0.8–1.1 mm (0.031–0.043 in) long. Female cones are cylindrical, softly-hairy at first, and sessile or on a peduncle up to 7 mm (0.28 in) long. Mature cones are 8–10 mm (0.31–0.39 in) long and 12–17 mm (0.47–0.67 in) in diameter, the samaras mid-brown and 8–10 mm (0.31–0.39 in) long.

== Taxonomy ==
This species was first formally described in 1936 by Charles Gardner who gave it the name Casuarina dielsiana in the Journal of the Royal Society of Western Australia, from specimens he collected with William Blackall on the summit of Mount Singleton, (near Paynes Find) in 1931. It was reclassified in 1982 as Allocasuarina dielsiana by Lawrie Johnson in the Journal of the Adelaide Botanic Gardens. The specific epithet (dielsiana) honours Ludwig Diels.

== Distribution and habitat ==
Northern sheoak grows in hilly country between the Murchison River, Paynes Find and the Die Hardy Range in the Avon Wheatbelt, Coolgardie, Geraldton Sandplains, Murchison and Yalgoo bioregions of south-western Western Australia.

== Conservation status ==
Allocasuarina dielsiana is listed as "not threatened" by the Government of Western Australia Department of Biodiversity, Conservation and Attractions.
