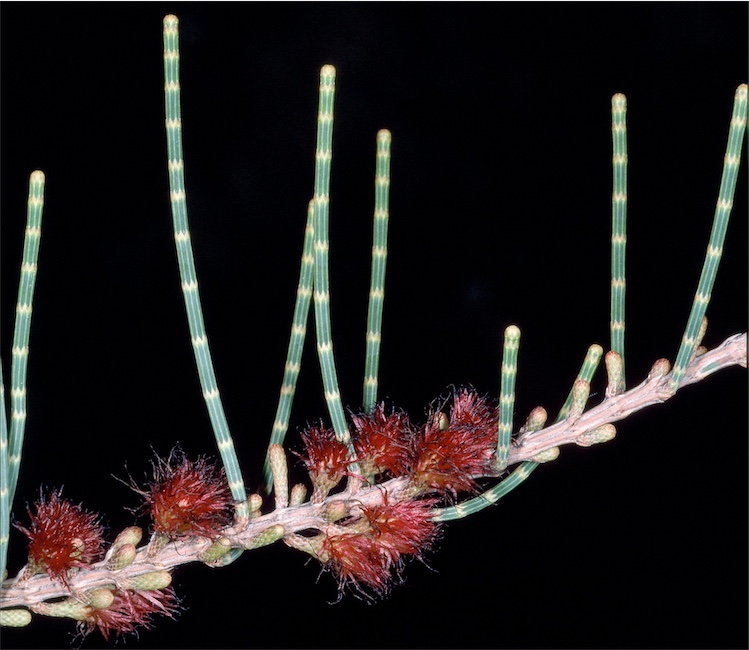
- Branchlets and immature female cones of subsp. ecarinata

Scientific classification
- Kingdom: Plantae
- Clade: Tracheophytes
- Clade: Angiosperms
- Clade: Eudicots
- Clade: Rosids
- Order: Fagales
- Family: Casuarinaceae
- Genus: Allocasuarina
- Species: A. lehmanniana

Binomial name
- Allocasuarina lehmanniana (Miq.) L.A.S.Johnson
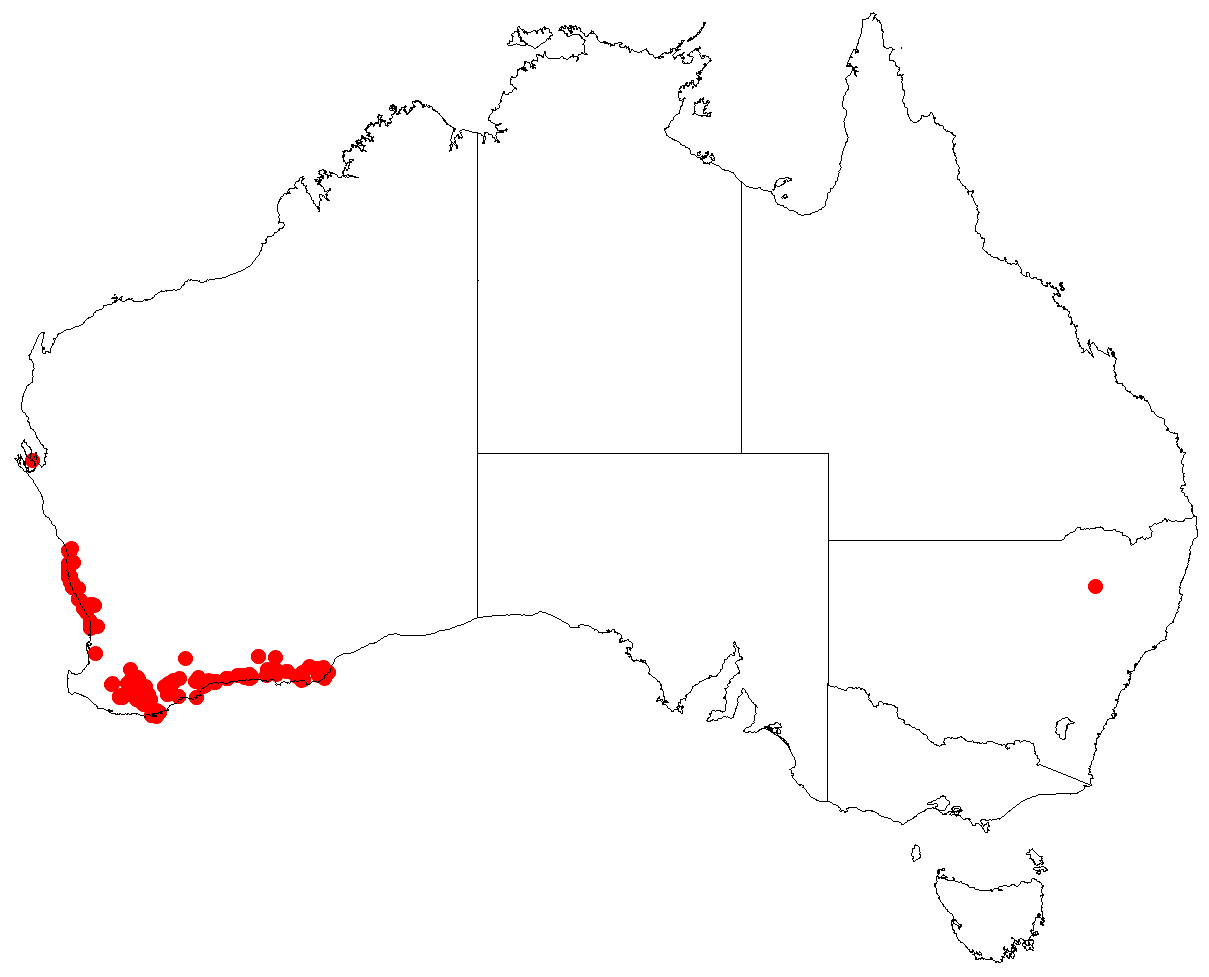
- Occurrence data from AVH

Synonyms
- Casuarina lehmanniana Miq.

= Allocasuarina lehmanniana =

Species of flowering plant

Allocasuarina lehmanniana, commonly known as dune sheoak, is a species of flowering plant in the family Casuarinaceae and is endemic to near-coastal areas of the south-west of Western Australia. It is dioecious or less commonly a monoecious shrub that has its leaves reduced to scales in whorls of six to eight, the mature fruiting cones 12–35 mm (0.47–1.38 in) long containing winged seeds (samaras) 4.0–5.5 mm (0.16–0.22 in) long.

== Description ==
Allocasuarina lehmanniana is a dioecious, or less commonly a monoecious shrub that typically grows to a height of 1.5–4 m (4 ft 11 in – 13 ft 1 in). Its branchlets are up to 120–200 mm (4.7–7.9 in) long (depending on subspecies), the leaves reduced to scale-like teeth 0.4–0.8 mm (0.016–0.031 in) long, arranged in whorls of six to eight around the branchlets. The sections of branchlet between the leaf whorls (the "articles") are mostly 5–9 mm (0.20–0.35 in) long and 0.7–1.2 mm (0.028–0.047 in) wide. Male flowers are arranged in spikes 10–30 mm (0.39–1.18 in) long, in whorls of five to eight per centimetre (per 0.39 in.), the anthers 0.6–0.9 mm (0.024–0.035 in) long. Female cones are on a peduncle 2–38 mm (0.079–1.496 in) long, the mature cones 12–35 mm (0.47–1.38 in) long and 7–12 mm (0.28–0.47 in) in diameter containing black samaras 4.0–5.5 mm (0.16–0.22 in) long.

== Taxonomy ==
Dune sheoak was first formally described in 1845 by Friedrich Anton Wilhelm Miquel who gave it the name Casuarina lehmanniana in Lehmann's Plantae Preissianae from specimens collected by Ludwig Preiss in 1840. It was reclassified in 1982 as Allocasuarina lehmanniana by Lawrie Johnson in the Journal of the Adelaide Botanic Gardens. The specific epithet (lehmanniana) honours Johann Georg Christian Lehmann.

In 1989, Johnson described two subspecies of Allocasuarina lehmanniana in the Flora of Australia and the names are accepted by the Australian Plant Census:

- Allocasuarina lehmanniana subsp. ecarinata L.A.S.Johnson has branchlets up to 120 mm (4.7 in) long, six or seven teeth, the mature cones 12–24 mm (0.47–0.94 in) long and 7–11 mm (0.28–0.43 in) in diameter.
- Allocasuarina lehmanniana (Miq.) L.A.S.Johnson subsp. lehmanniana has branchlets up to 200 mm (7.9 in) long, seven or eight teeth, the mature cones 13–35 mm (0.51–1.38 in) long and 9–12 mm (0.35–0.47 in) in diameter.

== Distribution and habitat ==
Allocasuarina lehmanniana grows in winter-wet places in near-coastal areas from Jurien Bay to near Albany and east to Ravensthorpe in the Avon Wheatbelt, Carnarvon, Esperance Plains, Geraldton Sandplains, Jarrah Forest, Mallee, Swan Coastal Plain and Warren bioregions of south-western Western Australia. Subspecies ecarinata occurs from near Ongerup to east of Esperance in the Esperance Plains and Mallee bioregions and subsp. lehmanniana between Jurien Bay to east of Albany in the Avon Wheatbelt, Esperance Plains, Geraldton Sandplains, Jarrah Forest, Mallee, Swan Coastal Plain and Warren bioregions.

== Conservation status ==
Both subspecies of A. lehmanniana are listed as "not threatened" by the Western Australian Government Department of Biodiversity, Conservation and Attractions.

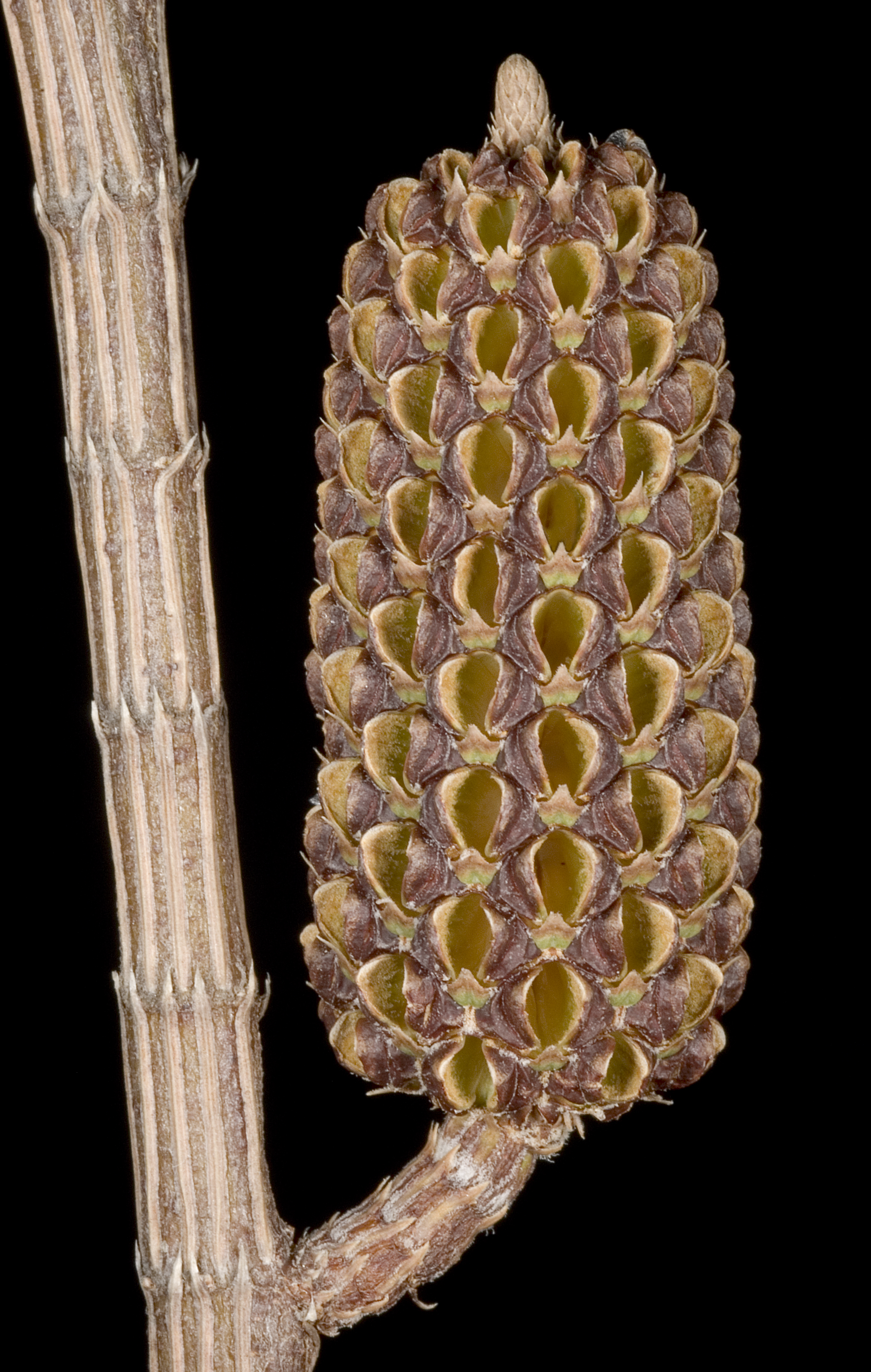
Mature cone
