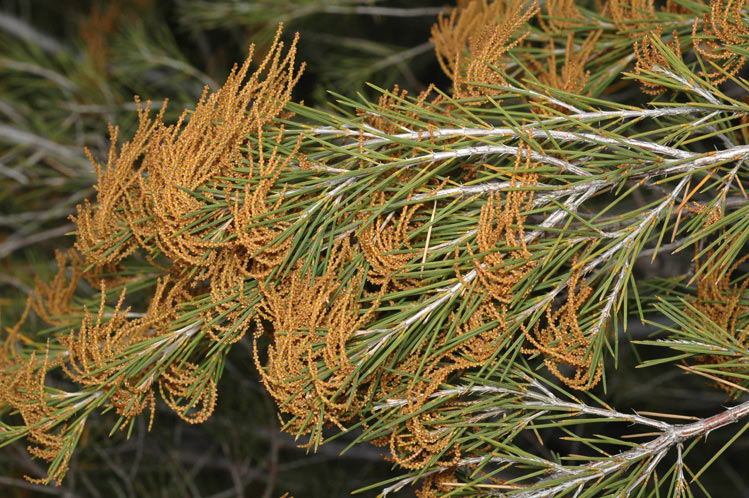
- In Kings Park Botanic Garden

Scientific classification
- Kingdom: Plantae
- Clade: Tracheophytes
- Clade: Angiosperms
- Clade: Eudicots
- Clade: Rosids
- Order: Fagales
- Family: Casuarinaceae
- Genus: Allocasuarina
- Species: A. acuaria

Binomial name
- Allocasuarina acuaria (F.Muell.) L.A.S.Johnson
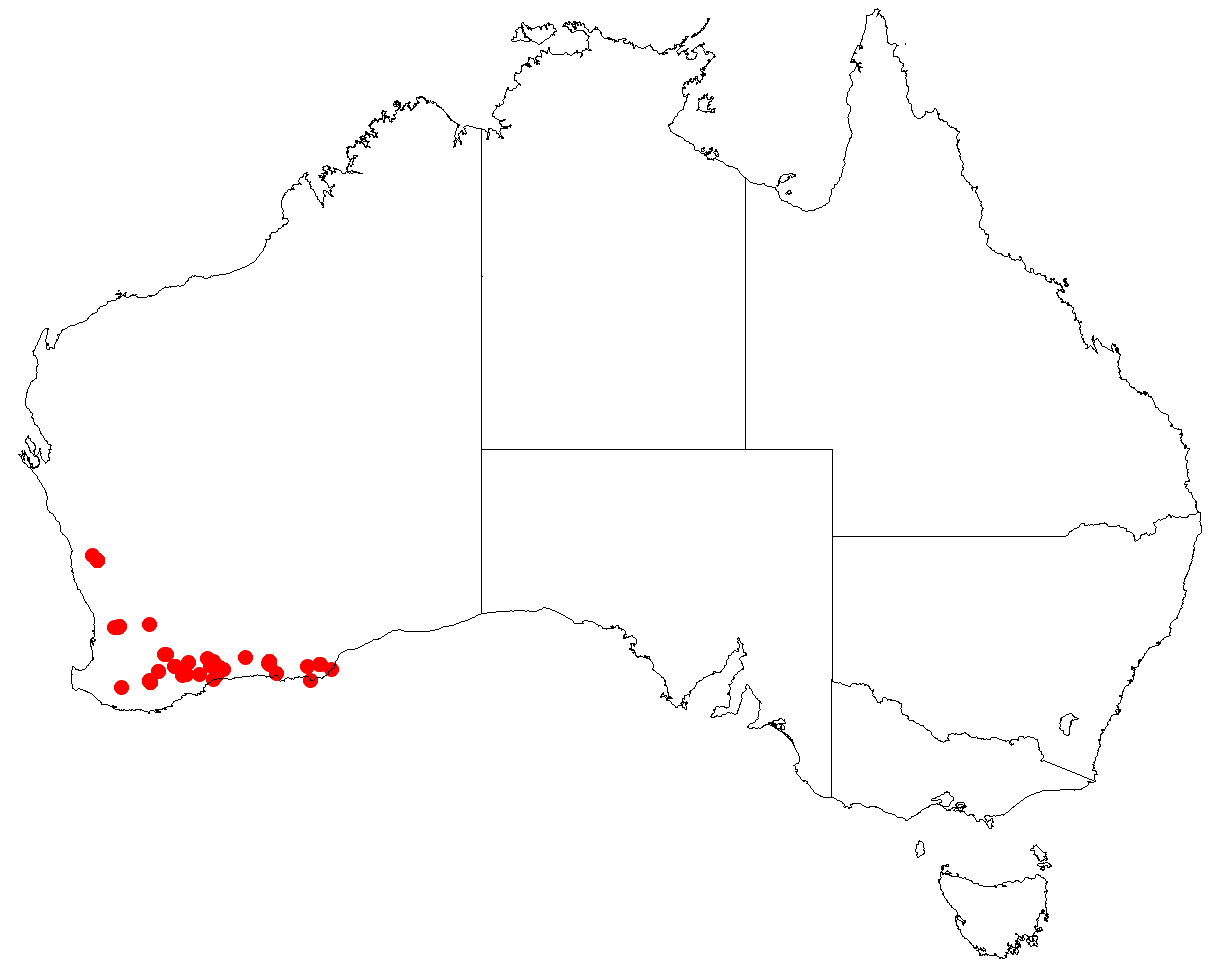
- Occurrence data from AVH

Synonyms
- Casuarina acuaria F.Muell.; Casuarina acuaria F.Muell. isonym; Casuarina oxyclada Miq.

= Allocasuarina acuaria =

Species of flowering plant

Allocasuarina acuaria is a species of flowering plant in the family Casuarinaceae and is endemic to the southwest of Western Australia. It is a dioecious shrub that has erect branchlets, the leaves reduced to scales in whorls of four on the ends of the branchlets, the fruiting cones 15–19 mm (0.59–0.75 in) long containing winged seeds (samaras) about 6 mm (0.24 in) long.

== Description ==
Allocasuarina acuaria is a dioecious shrub that typically grows to a height of 1–3 m (3 ft 3 in – 9 ft 10 in). Its branchlets are erect, 15–30 mm (0.59–1.18 in) long and 0.6–0.9 mm (0.024–0.035 in) in diameter, the leaves reduced to scale-like teeth 0.8–1.3 mm (0.031–0.051 in) long, arranged in whorls of four on the ends of branchlets forming a sharply-pointed tip. The flowers on male trees are arranged like a string of beads 10–40 mm (0.39–1.57 in) long in whorls of 4.5 to 5.5 per centimetre (per 0.39 in.), the anthers 0.7–0.9 mm (0.028–0.035 in) long. The female cones are on a peduncle 4–10 mm (0.16–0.39 in) long. Mature cones are cylindrical, 15–19 mm (0.59–0.75 in) long (20–26 mm (0.79–1.02 in) long including the bracteoles), and 13–18 mm (0.51–0.71 in) in diameter, the samaras about 6 mm (0.24 in) long and black.

== Taxonomy ==
This species was first formally described in 1867 by Ferdinand von Mueller who gave it the name Casuarina acuaria in the Journal of Botany, British and Foreign from specimens collected "by the late meritorious James Drummond". In 1982, it was reclassified in 1982 into the genus Allocasuarina by Lawrie Johnson in the Journal of the Adelaide Botanic Gardens. The specific epithet, (acuaria) means "possessing a needle", referring to the sharply pointed branchlets.

== Distribution and habitat ==
Allocasuarina acuaria grows in heath in sand in the Tambellup–Ravensthorpe area in the Avon Wheatbelt, Esperance Plains, Geraldton Sandplains, Jarrah Forest and Mallee bioregions of south-western Western Australia, and is listed as "not threatened" by the Western Australian Government Department of Biodiversity, Conservation and Attractions.
