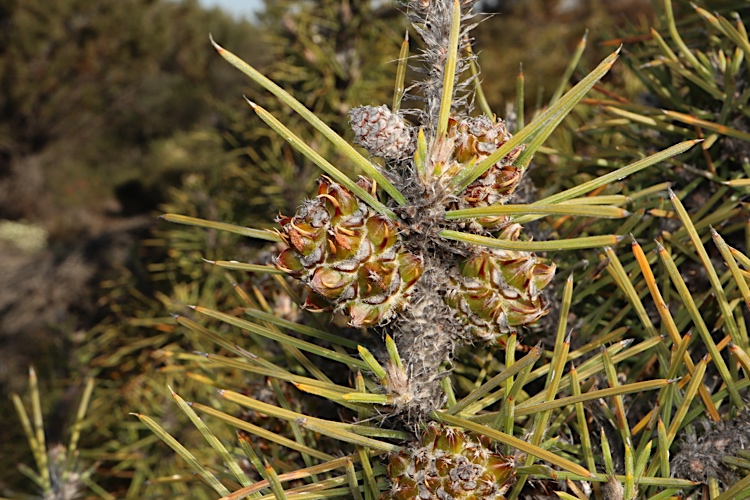

Scientific classification
- Kingdom: Plantae
- Clade: Tracheophytes
- Clade: Angiosperms
- Clade: Eudicots
- Clade: Rosids
- Order: Fagales
- Family: Casuarinaceae
- Genus: Allocasuarina
- Species: A. pinaster

Binomial name
- Allocasuarina pinaster (C.A.Gardner) L.A.S.Johnson
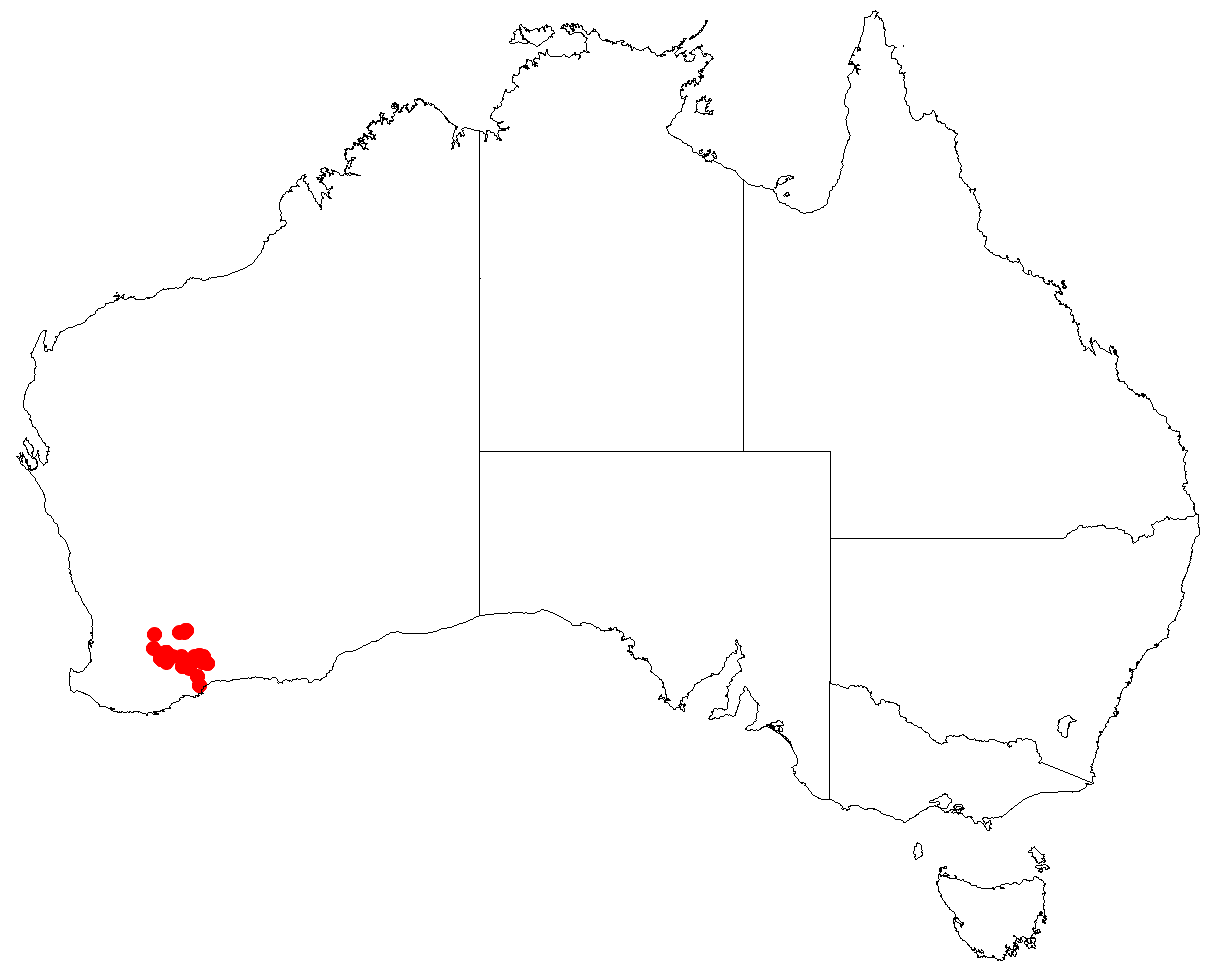
- Occurrence data from AVH

= Allocasuarina pinaster =

Species of flowering plant

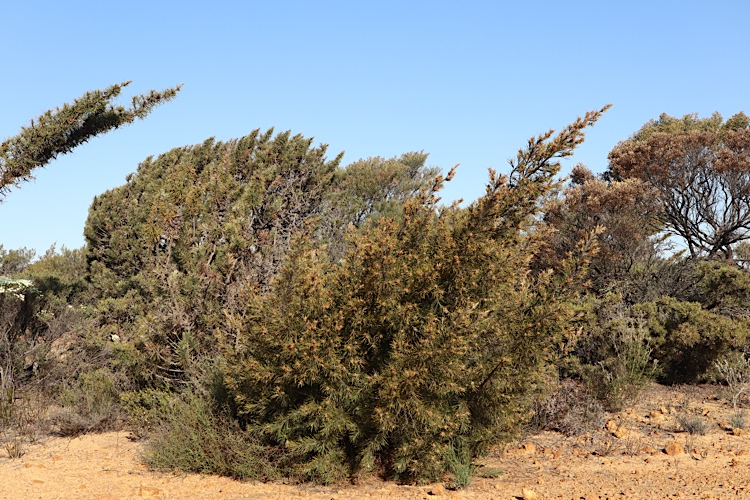
Habit near Lake Grace

Allocasuarina pinaster, commonly known as compass bush, is a species of flowering plant in the family Casuarinaceae and is endemic to the south-west of Western Australia. It is a prickly, dioecious shrub resembling a pine tree and that has its leaves reduced to scales in whorls of four, the mature fruiting cones 14–25 mm (0.55–0.98 in) long, containing winged seeds 10–11 mm (0.39–0.43 in) long.

== Description ==
Allocasuarina pinaster is a prickly, dioecious shrub that typically grows to a height of 1–3 m (3 ft 3 in – 9 ft 10 in) and resembles a small cedar. Its branchlets are 20–60 mm (0.79–2.36 in) long, the leaves reduced to scale-like teeth 0.4–1.3 mm (0.016–0.051 in) long, arranged in whorls of four around the needle-like branchlets. The sections of branchlet between the leaf whorls are mostly 20–50 mm (0.79–1.97 in) long, 1.0–1.2 mm (0.039–0.047 in) wide and more or less square in cross-section. Male flowers are arranged in spikes 5–10 mm (0.20–0.39 in) long, the anthers 1.0–1.4 mm (0.039–0.055 in) long. Female cones are sessile or on a peduncle up to 5 mm (0.20 in) long, the mature cones 14–25 mm (0.55–0.98 in) long and 12–16 mm (0.47–0.63 in) in diameter containing dark brown to black, winged seeds 10–11 mm (0.39–0.43 in) long.

== Taxonomy ==
This sheoak was first formally described in 1943 by Charles Gardner who gave it the name Casuarina pinaster in the Journal of the Royal Society of Western Australia from specimens collected near Nyabing by William Blackall. It was reclassified in 1982 as Allocasuarina pinaster by Lawrie Johnson in the Journal of the Adelaide Botanic Gardens. The specific epithet (pinaster) means "imitation pine". Specimens of compass bush consistently lean in a southerly direction at an angle of 30°- 40° from vertical.

== Distribution and habitat ==
Allocasuarina pinaster grows in tall shrubland and heath in gravelly lateritic soils in the Hyden – Dumbleyung area in the Avon Wheatbelt, Esperance Plains and Mallee bioregions of south-western Western Australia.
