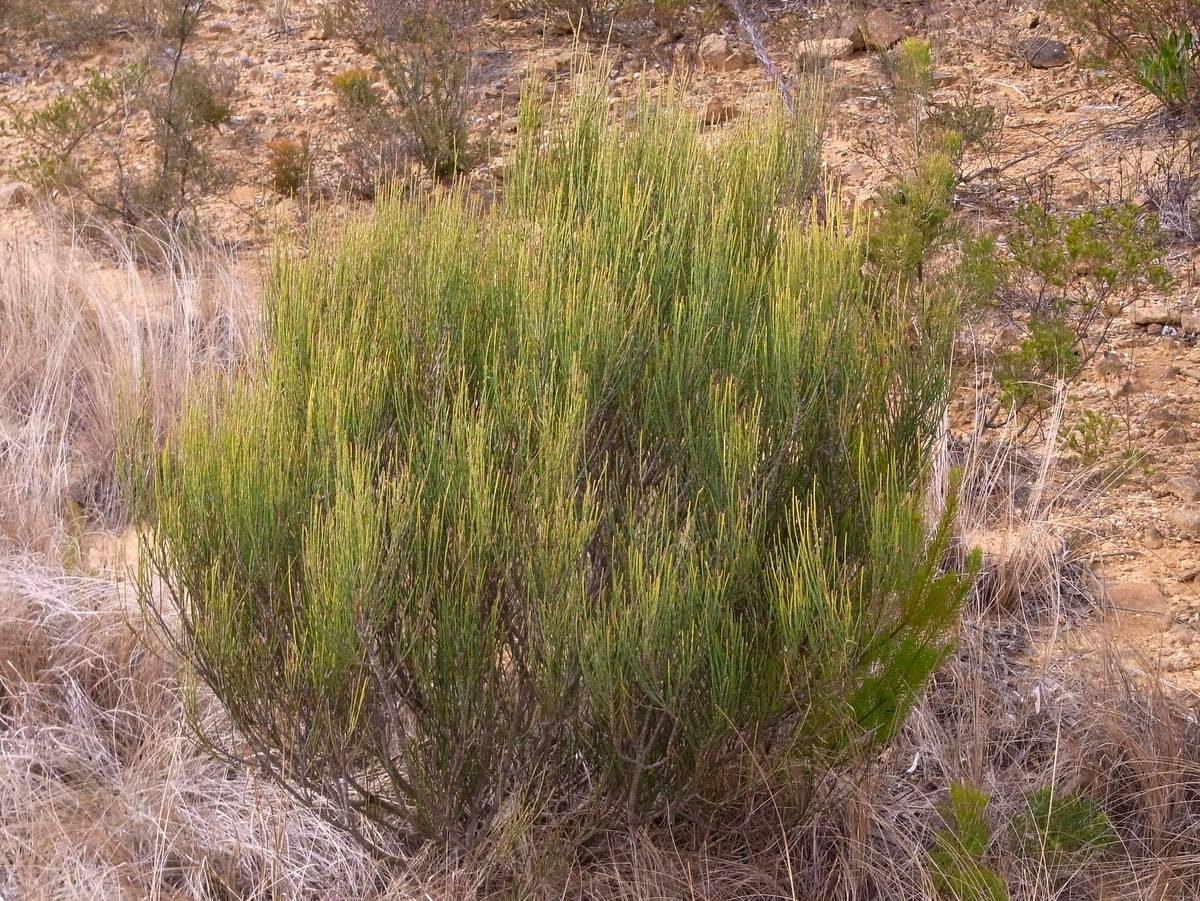
- Habit in the Blue Mountains

Scientific classification
- Kingdom: Plantae
- Clade: Tracheophytes
- Clade: Angiosperms
- Clade: Eudicots
- Clade: Rosids
- Order: Fagales
- Family: Casuarinaceae
- Genus: Allocasuarina
- Species: A. nana

Binomial name
- Allocasuarina nana (Sieber ex Spreng.) L.A.S.Johnson
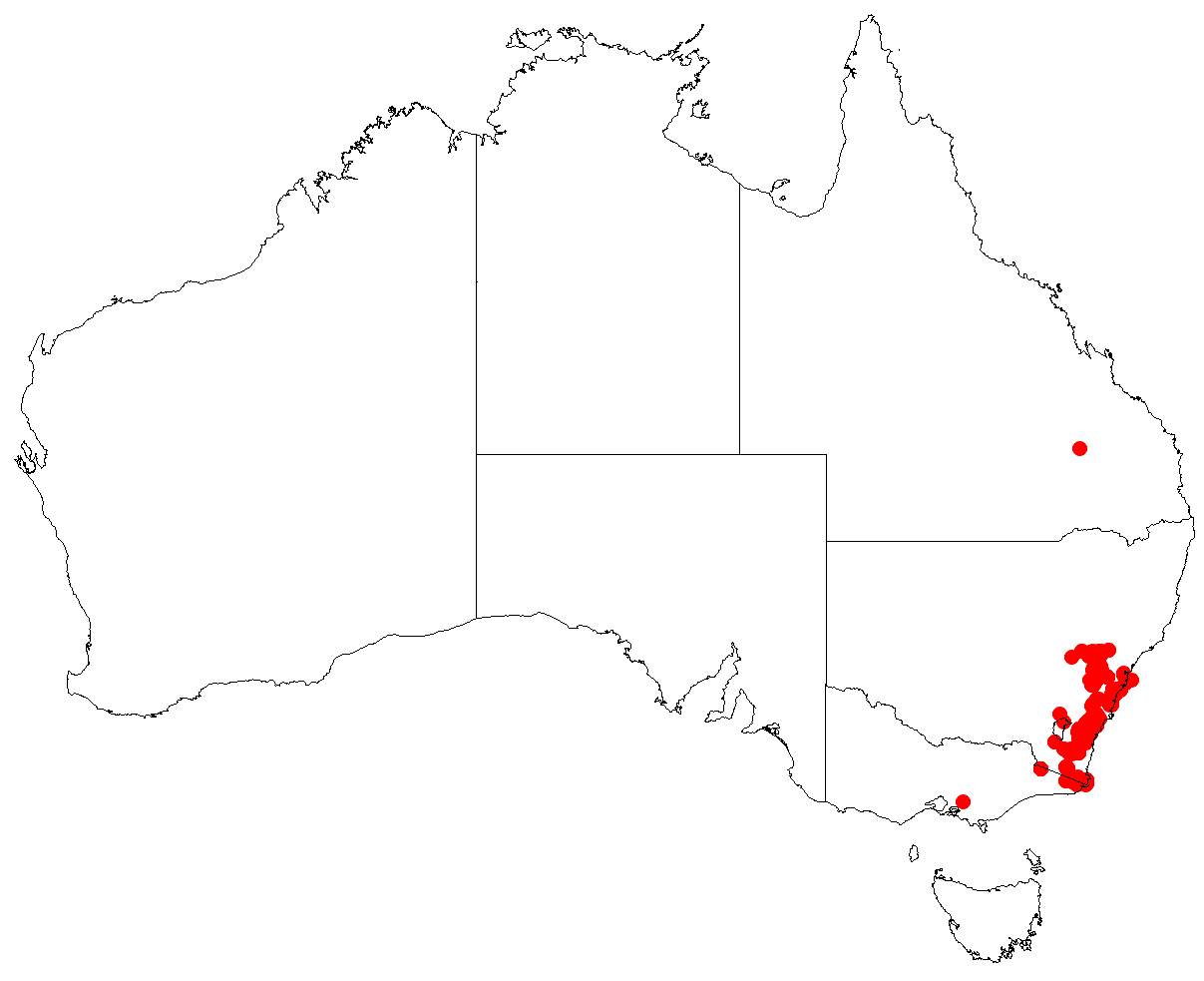
- Occurrence data from AVH

Synonyms
- Casuarina nana Sieber ex Spreng.

= Allocasuarina nana =

Dwarf she oak

Species of flowering plant

Allocasuarina nana, commonly known as dwarf she-oak or as stunted sheoak, is a species of flowering plant in the family Casuarinaceae and is endemic to south-eastern continental Australia. It is a low, spreading dioecious, rarely monoecious shrub that has branchlets up to 80 mm (3.1 in) long, the leaves reduced to scales in whorls of four to six, the fruiting cones 14–24 mm (0.55–0.94 in) long containing winged seeds 4–6 mm (0.16–0.24 in) long.

== Description ==
Allocasuarina nana is a spreading, dioecious or rarely monoecious shrub that typically grows to a height of 0.2–2 m (7.9 in – 6 ft 6.7 in). Its branchlets are more or less erect, up to 80 mm (3.1 in) long, the leaves reduced to erect, scale-like teeth 0.5–0.6 mm (0.020–0.024 in) long, arranged in whorls of four to six around the branchlets. The sections of branchlet between the leaf whorls are 5–6 mm (0.20–0.24 in) long and 0.5–0.8 mm (0.020–0.031 in) wide. Male flowers are arranged in dense spikes 5–10 mm (0.20–0.39 in) long, with 16 to 20 whorls per centimetre (per 0.39 in.), the anthers 0.5–0.6 mm (0.020–0.024 in) long. Female cones are sessile or on a peduncle up to 3 mm (0.12 in) long, the mature cones cylindrical to barrel-shaped, 14–24 mm (0.55–0.94 in) long and 10–15 mm (0.39–0.59 in) in diameter, the winged seeds 4–6 mm (0.16–0.24 in) long.

== Taxonomy ==
This she-oak was first described in 1826 by Kurt Polycarp Joachim Sprengel who gave it the name Casuarina nana in Systema Vegetabilium, from an unpublished description by Franz Sieber. In 1989 by Lawrie Johnson transferred the species to the genus Allocasuarina as A. nana in the Journal of the Adelaide Botanic Gardens. The specific epithet, (nana) means "dwarf".

== Distribution and habitat ==
Allocasuarina nana grows in heath over sandstone in exposed places on the coast and tablelands of New South Wales south from Cowan and Glen Davis to the far north east of Victoria.

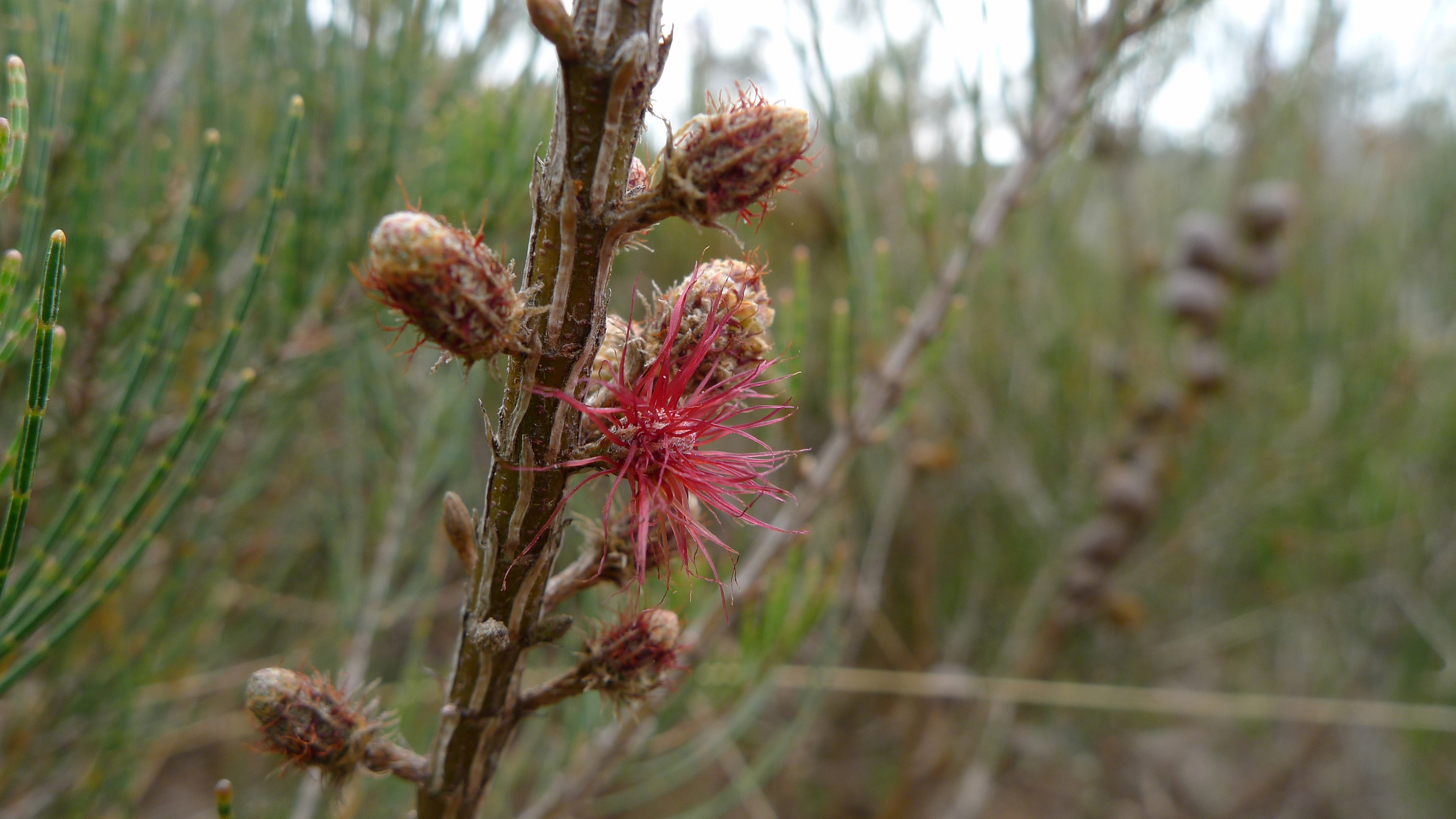
Immature female cones

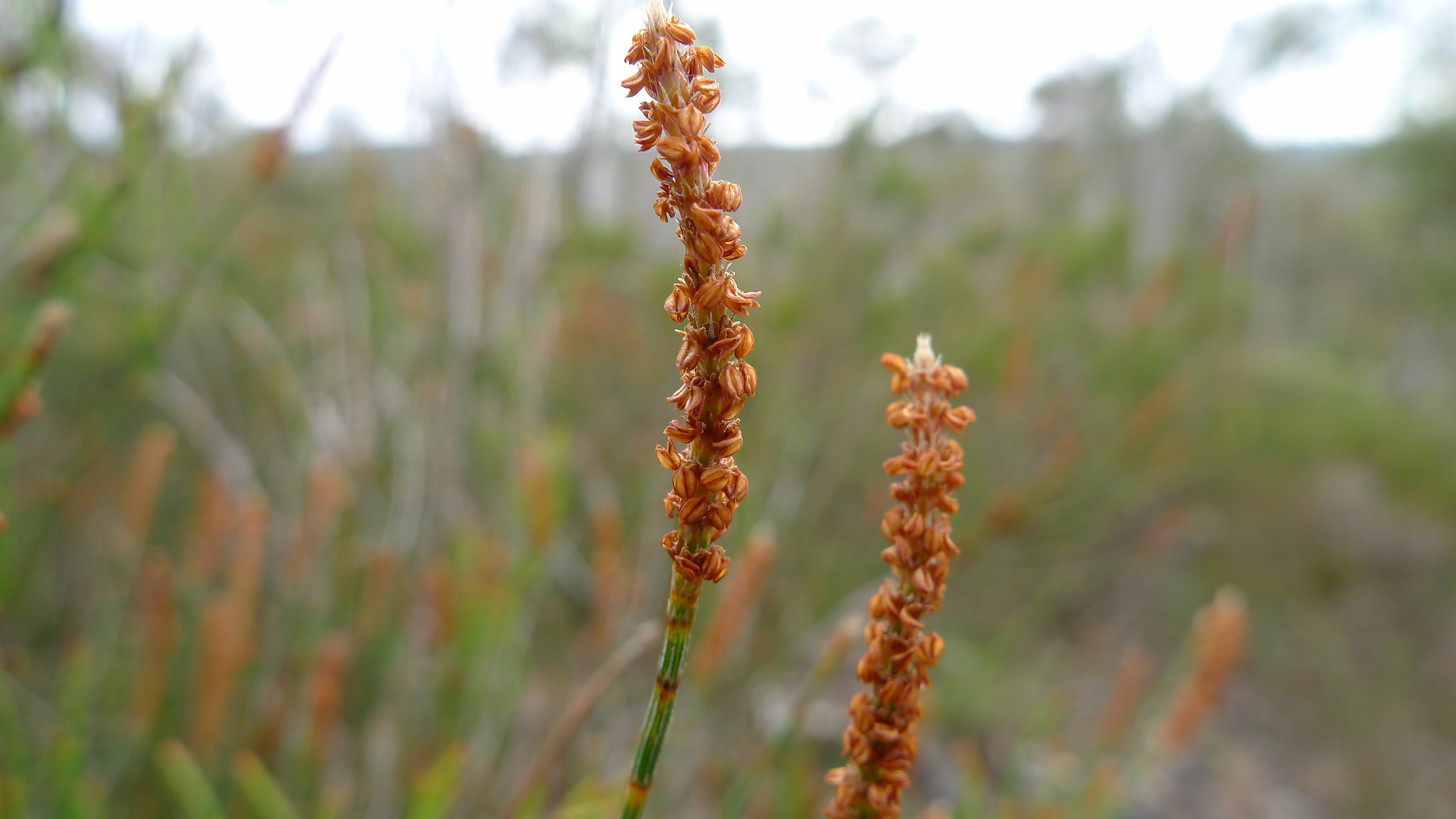
Male spikes

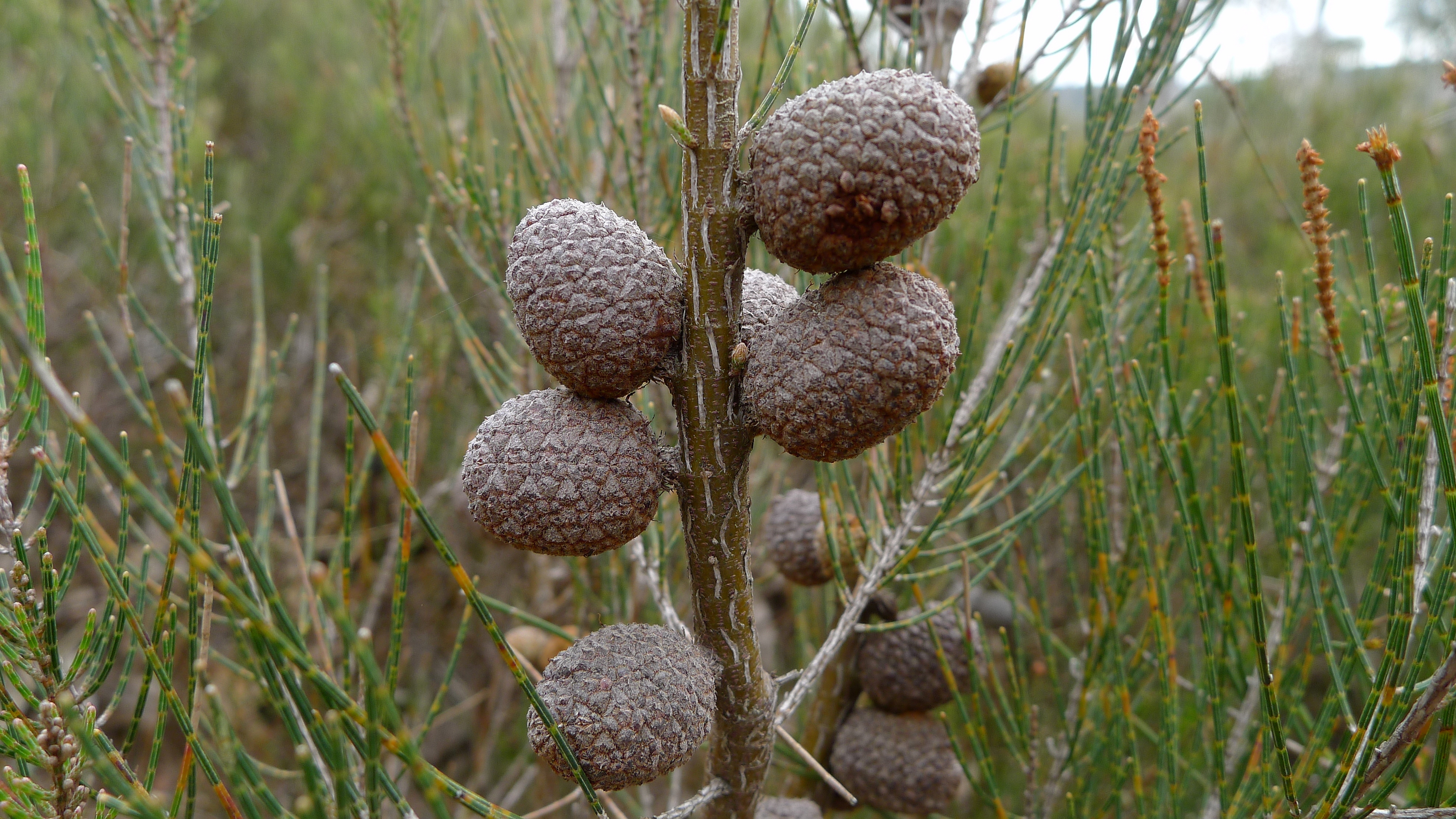
Mature cones in Morton National Park
