= Allocasuarina drummondiana =

Scientific classification
- Kingdom: Plantae
- Clade: Tracheophytes
- Clade: Angiosperms
- Clade: Eudicots
- Clade: Rosids
- Order: Fagales
- Family: Casuarinaceae
- Genus: Allocasuarina
- Species: A. drummondiana

Binomial name
- Allocasuarina drummondiana (Miq.) L.A.S.Johnson
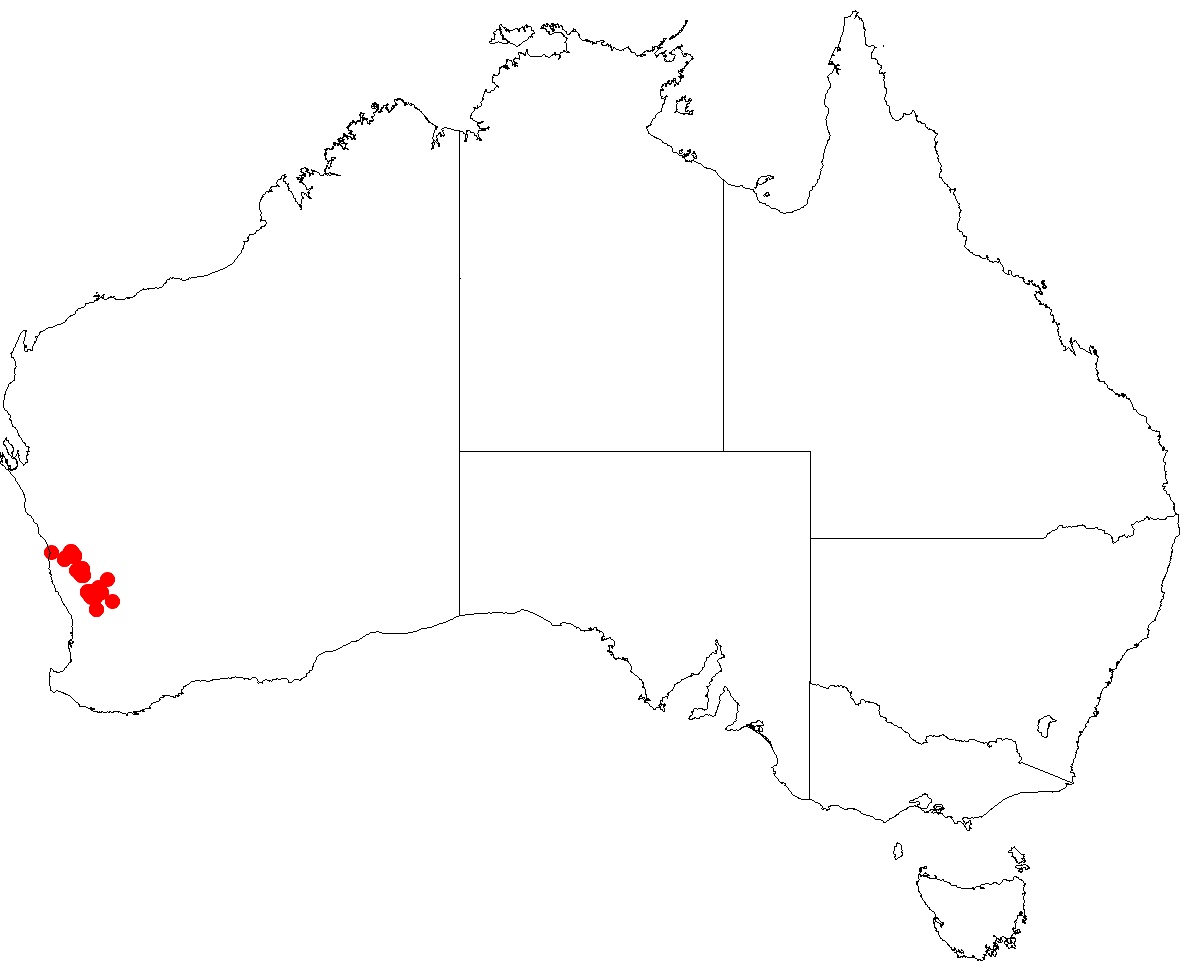
- Occurrence data from AVH

Synonyms
- Casuarina drummondiana Miq.

Species of flowering plant

Allocasuarina drummondiana is a species of flowering plant in the family Casuarinaceae and is endemic to the south-west of Western Australia. It is an intricately branched, dioecious shrub that has its leaves reduced to scales in whorls of six or seven, the mature fruiting cones 8–15 mm (0.31–0.59 in) long containing winged seeds (samaras) 3–4 mm (0.12–0.16 in) long.

== Description ==
Allocasuarina drummondiana is an intricately branched, dioecious shrub that typically grows to a height of 0.5–3 m (1 ft 8 in – 9 ft 10 in). The branches bearing the needle-like end-branchlets are green. Its needle-like branchlets are up to 20 mm (0.79 in) long, the leaves reduced to scale-like teeth 0.5–0.9 mm (0.020–0.035 in) long, arranged in whorls of six or seven around the branchlets. The sections of branchlet between the leaf whorls (the "articles") are mostly 1.5–2.5 mm (0.059–0.098 in) long and 0.9–1.2 mm (0.035–0.047 in) wide. Male flowers are arranged in spikes 4–10 mm (0.16–0.39 in) long, in whorls of about 20 per centimetre (per 0.39 in.), the anthers about 0.7 mm (0.028 in) long. Female cones are oval to cylindrical and sessile on woody branches. Mature cones are 8–15 mm (0.31–0.59 in) long and 7–8 mm (0.28–0.31 in) in diameter containing samaras 3–4 mm (0.12–0.16 in) long with a small wing and a hairy seed.

== Taxonomy ==
This species was first formally described in 1848 by Friedrich Anton Wilhelm Miquel who gave it the name Casuarina drummondiana in his Revisio critica Casuarinarum, from specimens collected in the Swan River Colony by James Drummond. It was reclassified in 1982 as Allocasuarina drummondiana by Lawrie Johnson in the Journal of the Adelaide Botanic Gardens. The specific epithet (drummondiana) honours the collector of the type specimens.

== Distribution and habitat ==
Allocasuarina drummondiana grows in tall heath in the area around Three Springs and Wongan Hills in the Avon Wheatbelt and Geraldton Sandplains bioregions of south-western Western Australia.

== Conservation status ==
Allocasuarina drummondiana is listed as "not threatened" by the Government of Western Australia Department of Biodiversity, Conservation and Attractions.
