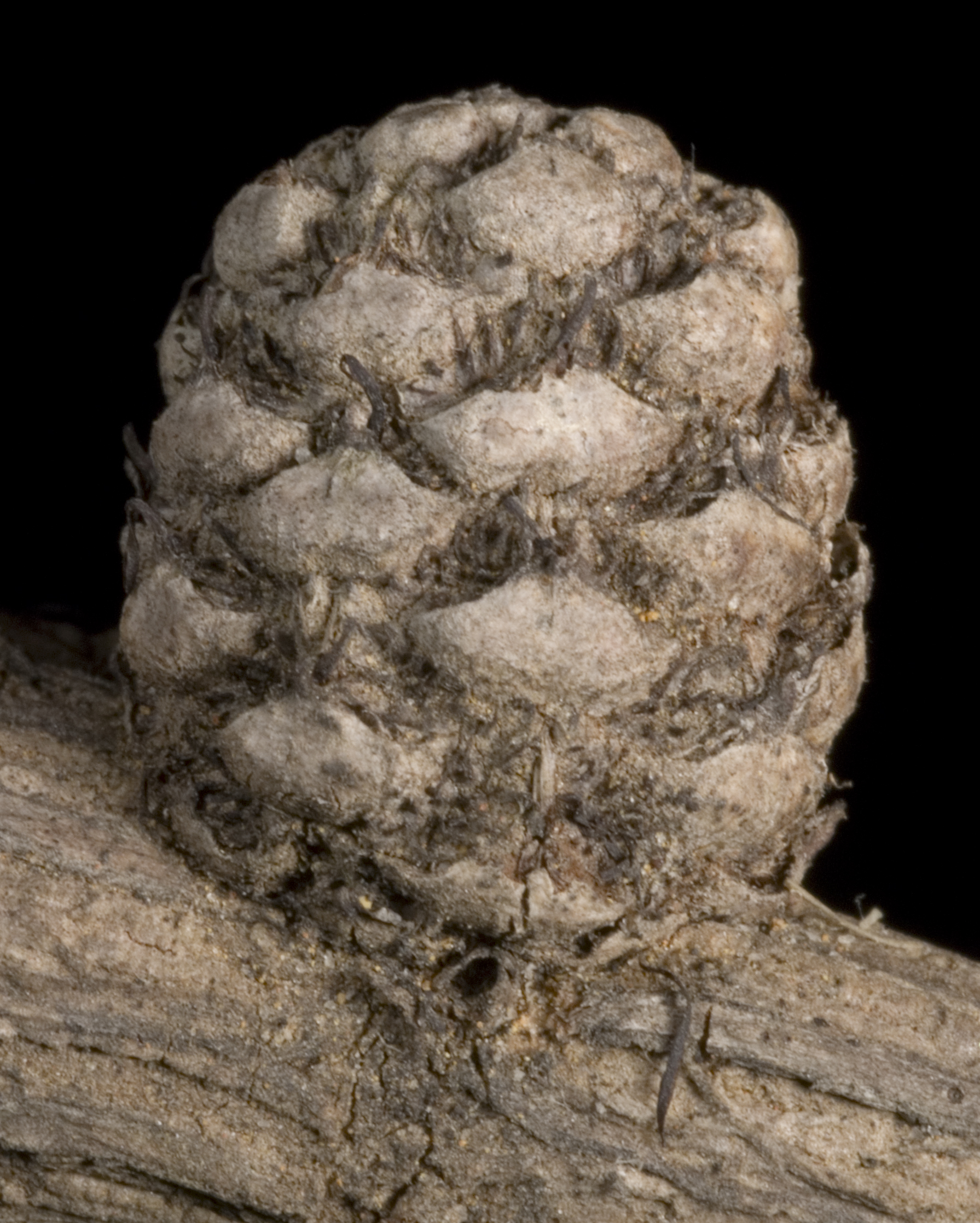

Scientific classification
- Kingdom: Plantae
- Clade: Tracheophytes
- Clade: Angiosperms
- Clade: Eudicots
- Clade: Rosids
- Order: Fagales
- Family: Casuarinaceae
- Genus: Allocasuarina
- Species: A. ramosissima

Binomial name
- Allocasuarina ramosissima (C.A.Gardner) L.A.S.Johnson

= Allocasuarina ramosissima =

Species of flowering plant

Allocasuarina ramosissima is a species of flowering plant in the family Casuarinaceae and is endemic to the south-west of Western Australia. It is a dioecious shrub with its leaves reduced to overlapping scales in whorls of five, the mature fruiting cones sessile and 9–13 mm (0.35–0.51 in) long, containing winged seeds 4.5–5.0 mm (0.18–0.20 in) long.

== Description ==
Allocasuarina ramosissima is a dioecious, somewhat divaricate shrub that typically grows to a height of 0.3–1.2 m (1 ft 0 in – 3 ft 11 in). Its branchlets are erect 10–60 mm (0.39–2.36 in) long, the leaves reduced to overlapping scale-like teeth 0.6–1.3 mm (0.024–0.051 in) long, arranged in whorls of five around the needle-like branchlets. The sections of branchlet between the leaf whorls are mostly 6–20 mm (0.24–0.79 in) long and 0.6–1 mm (0.024–0.039 in) wide. Male flowers are arranged in spike-like heads 1.5–2.0 mm (0.059–0.079 in) long, the anthers 0.6–0.7 mm (0.024–0.028 in) long. Female cones are sessile, the mature cones 9–13 mm (0.35–0.51 in) long and 7–9 mm (0.28–0.35 in) in diameter, containing dark brown winged seeds 4.5–5.0 mm (0.18–0.20 in) long.

== Taxonomy ==
This sheoak was first formally described in 1964 by Charles Gardner who gave it the name Casuarina ramosissima in the Journal of the Royal Society of Western Australia from specimens he collected near Dandaragan. It was reclassified in 1982 as Allocasuarina ramosissima by Lawrie Johnson in the Journal of the Adelaide Botanic Gardens. The specific epithet (ramosissima) means "much branched".

== Distribution and habitat ==
Allocasuarina ramosissima grows in heath on sand in the Badgingarra – Dandaragan area in the Avon Wheatbelt, Geraldton Sandplains, Jarrah Forest and Swan Coastal Plain bioregions of south-western Western Australia.
