= Allocasuarina tessellata =

Conservation status
- Priority Three — Poorly Known Taxa (DEC)

Scientific classification
- Kingdom: Plantae
- Clade: Tracheophytes
- Clade: Angiosperms
- Clade: Eudicots
- Clade: Rosids
- Order: Fagales
- Family: Casuarinaceae
- Genus: Allocasuarina
- Species: A. tessellata

Binomial name
- Allocasuarina tessellata (C.A.Gardner) L.A.S.Johnson

Synonyms
- Casuarina tessellata C.A.Gardner

Species of flowering plant

Allocasuarina tessellata is a species of flowering plant in the family Casuarinaceae and is endemic to the south-west of Western Australia. It is a dioecious shrub or tree that has more or less erect branchlets, the leaves reduced to scales in whorls of eight or nine, the mature fruiting cones 26–55 mm (1.0–2.2 in) long containing winged seeds 5.0–7.5 mm (0.20–0.30 in) long.

== Description ==
Allocasuarina tessellata is a dioecious shrub or tree that typically grows to a height of 3–5 m (9.8–16.4 ft). Its branchlets are more or less erect, up to 200 mm (7.9 in) long, the leaves reduced to scale-like teeth arranged in whorls of eight or nine, around the branchlets. The sections of branchlet between the leaf whorls are 7–14 mm (0.28–0.55 in) long and 0.7–1 mm (0.028–0.039 in) wide. Male flowers are arranged in spikes 20–40 mm (0.79–1.57 in) long, in whorls of seven to eight per centimetre (per 0.39 in.), the anthers about 0.8 mm (0.031 in) long. Female cones are on a peduncle 7–13 mm (0.28–0.51 in) long, the mature cones are 26–55 mm (1.0–2.2 in) long and 14–18 mm (0.55–0.71 in) in diameter, the winged seeds 5.0–7.5 mm (0.20–0.30 in) long.

== Taxonomy ==
This sheoak was first formally described in 1936 by Charles Gardner who gave it the name Casuarina tessellata in the Journal of the Royal Society of Western Australia from specimens collected in 1931. It was reclassified in 1982 as Allocasuarina tessellata by Lawrie Johnson in the Journal of the Adelaide Botanic Gardens. The specific epithet (tessellata) means "in a pattern of small squares".

== Distribution and habitat ==
Allocasuarina tessellata is only known from the Avon Wheatbelt and Yalgoo bioregions of inland Western Australia, where it grows in loamy and sandy soils near greenstone and dolerite boulders.

== Conservation status ==
Allocasuarina tessellata is listed as "Priority Three" by the Government of Western Australia Department of Biodiversity, Conservation and Attractions.
