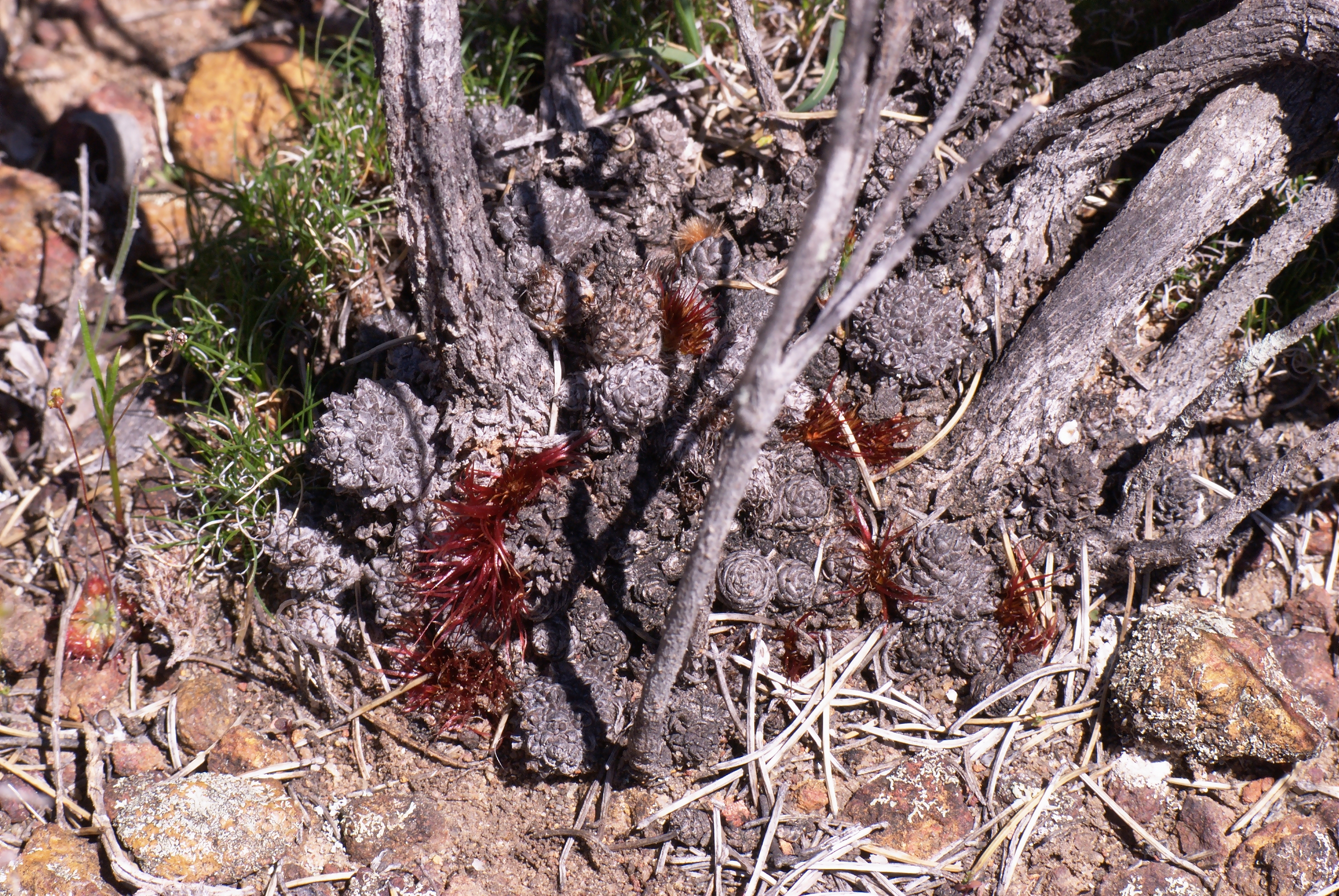
- Female cones

Conservation status
- Priority Three — Poorly Known Taxa (DEC)

Scientific classification
- Kingdom: Plantae
- Clade: Tracheophytes
- Clade: Angiosperms
- Clade: Eudicots
- Clade: Rosids
- Order: Fagales
- Family: Casuarinaceae
- Genus: Allocasuarina
- Species: A. grevilleoides

Binomial name
- Allocasuarina grevilleoides (Diels) L.A.S.Johnson

Synonyms
- Allocasuarina grevillioides Hopper, S.J.van Leeuwen, A.P.Br. & S.J.Patrick orth. var.; Casuarina grevilleoides Diels

= Allocasuarina grevilleoides =

Species of flowering plant

Allocasuarina grevilleoides is a species of flowering plant in the family Casuarinaceae and is endemic to the south-west of Western Australia. It is a small, spreading, dioecious shrub that forms a lignotuber, and has more or less erect, sharply-pointed branchlets, the leaves reduced to scales in whorls of four, the mature fruiting cones 9–14 mm (0.35–0.55 in) long containing winged seeds (samaras) 5.5–7.0 mm (0.22–0.28 in) long.

== Description ==
Allocasuarina campestris is a spreading dioecious shrub that typically grows to a height of 15–30 cm (5.9–11.8 in). Its branchlets are more or less erect and sharply pointed, 10–30 mm (0.39–1.18 in) long, the leaves reduced to erect, overlapping, scale-like teeth 0.3–0.6 mm (0.012–0.024 in) long, arranged in whorls of four around the branchlets, but withering as they age. The sections of branchlet between the leaf whorls (the "articles") are 10–24 mm (0.39–0.94 in) long and 0.5–0.8 mm (0.020–0.031 in) wide. Male flowers are arranged in dense spikes 2–5 mm (0.079–0.197 in) long, the anthers 0.6–0.7 mm (0.024–0.028 in) long. Female cones are oval and sessile, the mature cones 9–14 mm (0.35–0.55 in) long and 6–9 mm (0.24–0.35 in) in diameter, the samaras dark brown and 5.5–7.0 mm (0.22–0.28 in) long.

== Taxonomy ==
This sheoak was first formally described in 1904 by the botanist Ludwig Diels who gave it the name Casuarina grevilleoides in Botanische Jahrbücher für Systematik, Pflanzengeschichte und Pflanzengeographie. It was reclassified in 1982 into the genus Allocasuarina as A. grevilleoides by Lawrie Johnson in the Journal of the Adelaide Botanic Gardens.

== Distribution and habitat ==
Allocasuarina grevilleoides is restricted to the Jurien Bay-Mogumber area in the Avon Wheatbelt, Geraldton Sandplains, Jarrah Forest and Swan Coastal Plain bioregions of south-western Western Australia.

== Conservation status ==
This allocasuarina is listed as "Priority Three" by the Government of Western Australia Department of Biodiversity, Conservation and Attractions, meaning that it is poorly known and known from only a few locations but is not under imminent threat.

== Images ==
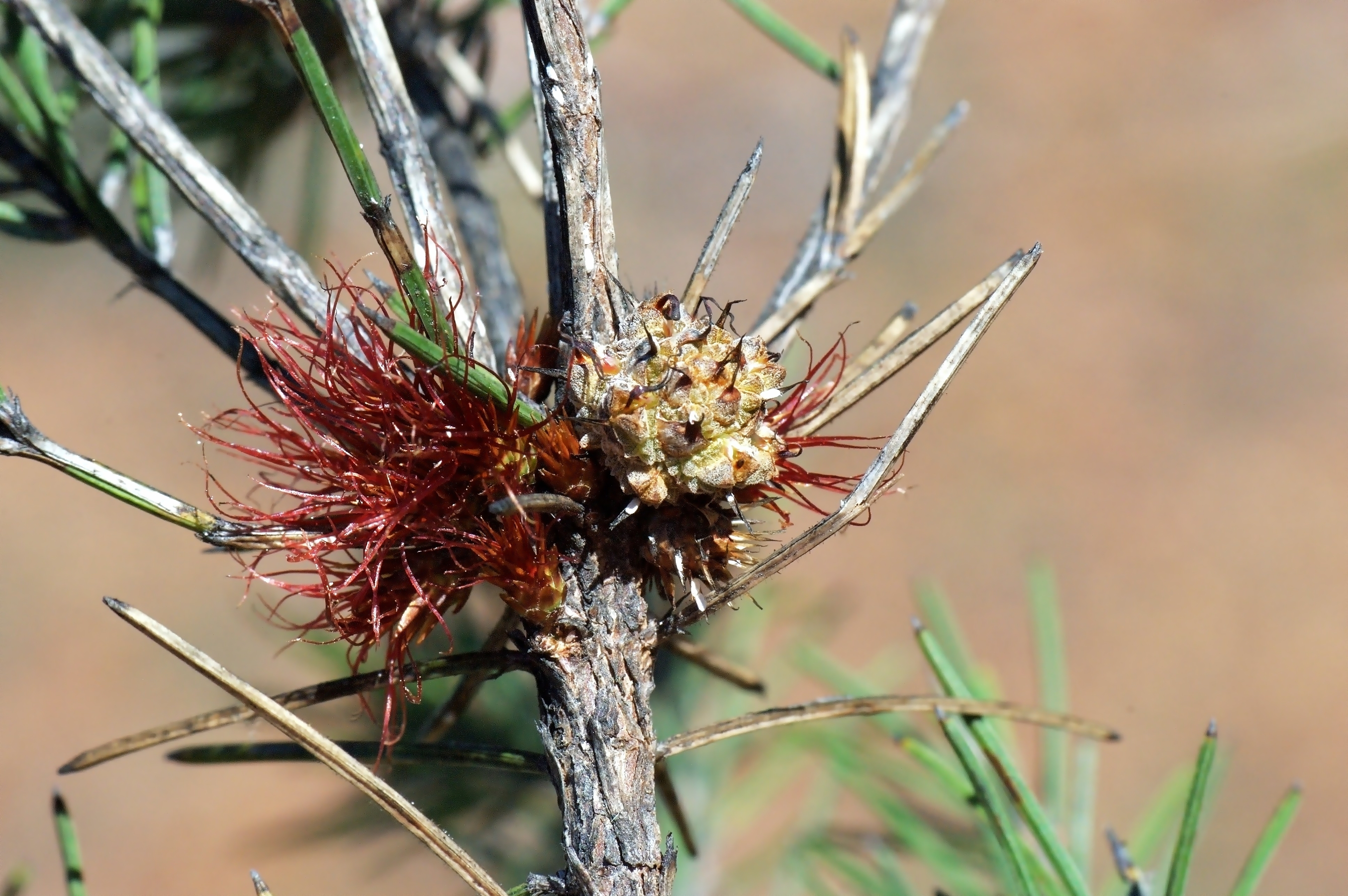
Female cones

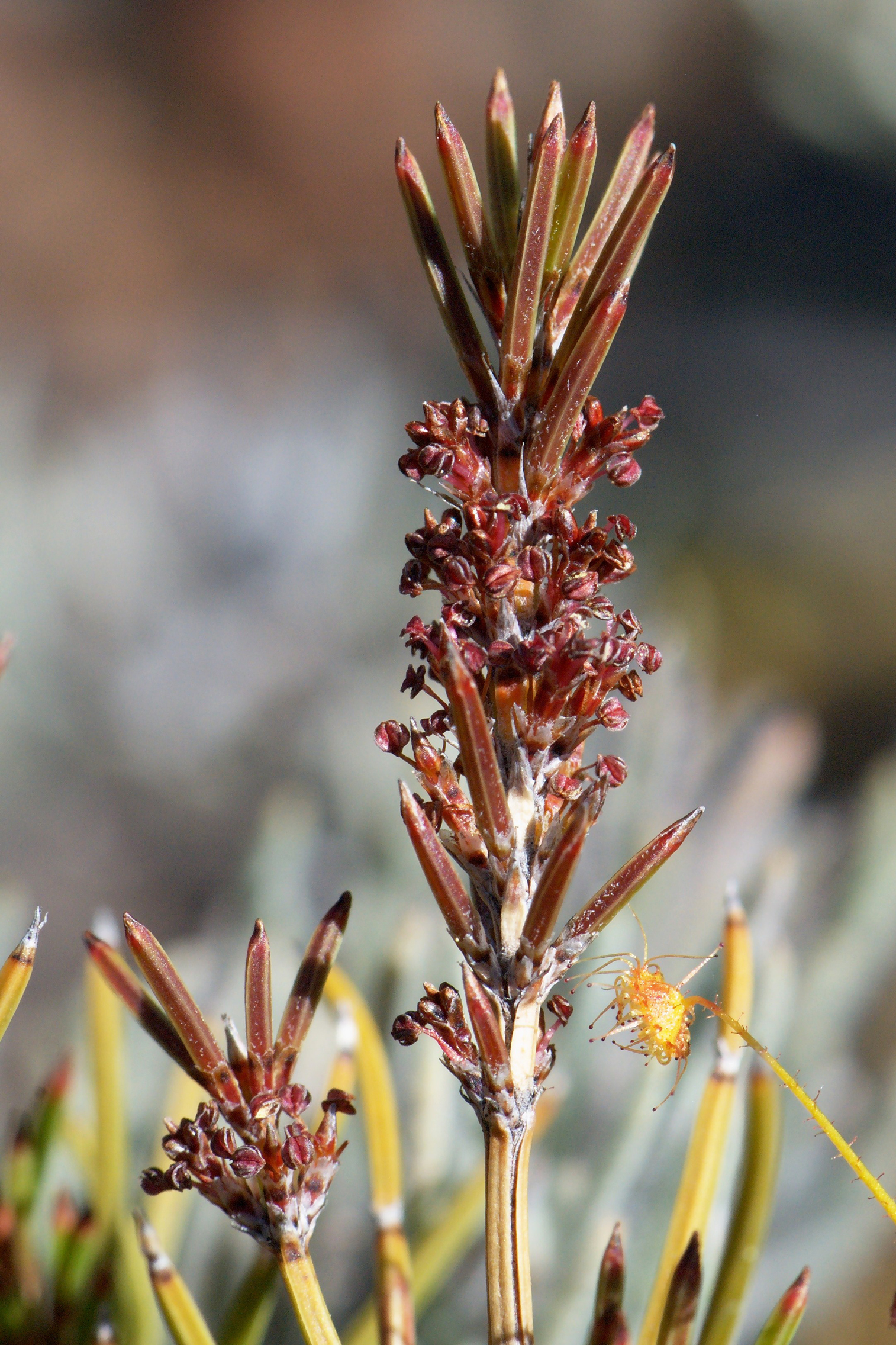
Male flowers
