= Gnarlbine Rock =

Granite rock outcrop in Western Australia

Coordinates: 31.1482°S 120.9595°E

Gnarlbine Rock is a granite rock located approximately 492 km (306 mi) east of Perth and approximately 30 km (19 mi) southwest of Coolgardie in the Goldfields-Esperance region of Western Australia. It is found within a 640-acre (260 ha) heritage listed reserve.

The word Gnarlbine is used to describe a number of things in the Coolgardie area; originally Coolgardie was called Gnarlbine.

The rock is located along the Holland Track between Broomehill and Coolgardie and has camp sites available. The nearby soak was the principal water supply during the Coolgardie gold rush. The waterhole on the eastern side of the rock was also important to Indigenous Australian peoples as a water source. The explorer Henry Lefroy came to the soak in 1863 and it soon became a vital stopping place for explorers and prospectors in the area. Charles Cooke Hunt camped by the rock in 1864, noting that the water might prove useful. Gilles McPherson, an explorer and prospector, was saved by an Aboriginal named Toobey in 1888, who brought him to the well after he could find no water. Charles Cooke Hunt returned in July 1865 when under his direction a well was dug out and stoned up.

== See also ==
- Granite outcrops of Western Australia
