= Araeostoma =

Scientific classification
- Kingdom: Animalia
- Phylum: Arthropoda
- Class: Insecta
- Order: Lepidoptera
- Family: Xyloryctidae
- Genus: Araeostoma; Turner, 1917
- Species: A. aenicta

Binomial name
- Araeostoma aenicta Turner, 1917

Monotypic moth genus in family Xyloryctidae

Araeostoma aenicta is a moth in the family Xyloryctidae, and the only species in the genus Araeostoma. It was described by Alfred Jefferis Turner in 1917 and is found in Australia, where it has been recorded from Queensland and New South Wales.

The wingspan is 17–28 mm. The forewings are fuscous with patchy whitish irroration and a dark fuscous discal dot above the middle at one-third and a second obliquely elongate before two-thirds. The posterior third of the costal edge is whitish with four dark fuscous dots and with a fine crenulate whitish line just before the termen. The hindwings are fuscous.
