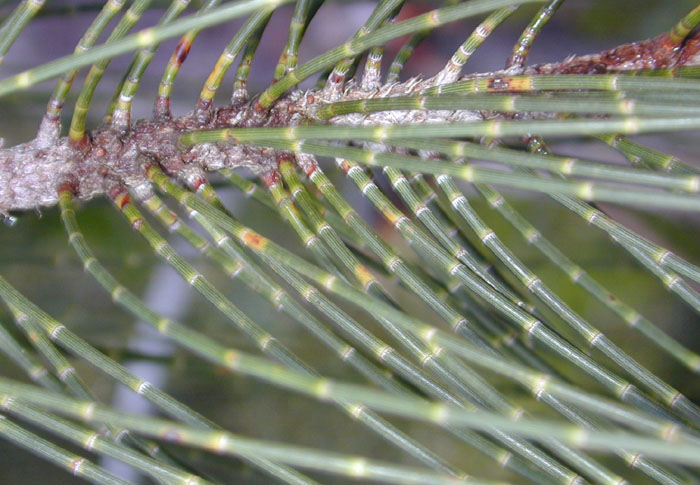
- Common ironwood (Casuarina equisetifolia)

Scientific classification
- Kingdom: Plantae
- Clade: Tracheophytes
- Clade: Angiosperms
- Clade: Eudicots
- Clade: Rosids
- Order: Fagales
- Family: Casuarinaceae; R.Br.

Type genus
- Casuarina L.

Genera
- Allocasuarina L.A.S.Johnson 1982; Casuarina L. 1759; Ceuthostoma L.A.S.Johnson 1986; Gymnostoma L.A.S.Johnson 1980
- The range of Casuarinaceae

= Casuarinaceae =

Family of plants

The Casuarinaceae are a family of dicotyledonous flowering plants placed in the order Fagales, consisting of four genera and 91 species of trees and shrubs native to eastern Africa, Australia, Southeast Asia, Malesia, Papuasia, and the Pacific Islands. At one time, all species were placed in the genus Casuarina. Lawrence Alexander Sidney Johnson separated out many of those species and renamed them into the new genera of Gymnostoma in 1980 and 1982, Allocasuarina in 1982, and Ceuthostoma in 1988, with some additional formal descriptions of new species in each other genus. At the time, it was somewhat controversial. The monophyly of these genera was later supported in a 2003 phylogenetic study of the family. In the Wettstein system, this family was the only one placed in the order Verticillatae. Likewise, in the Engler, Cronquist, and Kubitzki systems, the Casuarinaceae were the only family placed in the order Casuarinales.

Members of this family are characterized by drooping equisetoid (meaning "looking like Equisetum"; that is, horsetail) twigs, evergreen foliage, monoecious or dioecious and infructescences ('fruiting bodies') strobiloid or cone-like, meaning combining many outward-pointing valves, each containing a seed, into roughly spherical, cone-like, woody structures. The roots have nitrogen-fixing nodules that contain the soil actinomycete Frankia.

In Australia, the most widely used common name for Casuarinaceae species is sheoak or she-oak (a comparison of the timber quality with English oak). Other common names in Australia include ironwood, bull-oak or buloke, beefwood, or cassowary tree.

The Shire of Buloke in Victoria, Australia, is named after the species Allocasuarina luehmannii.

== Systematics ==
Modern molecular phylogenetics suggest the following relationships:

- - Myricaceae (outgroup)
  - Casuarinaceae
    - Gymnostoma
    - - Ceuthostoma
      - - Allocasuarina
        - Casuarina
