= Stanwatkinsius =

Scientific classification
- Kingdom: Animalia
- Phylum: Arthropoda
- Class: Insecta
- Order: Coleoptera
- Suborder: Polyphaga
- Infraorder: Elateriformia
- Family: Buprestidae
- Genus: Stanwatkinsius; Barker & Bellamy, 2001

Genus of beetles

Stanwatkinsius is a genus of beetles in the family Buprestidae, the jewel beetles. They are native to Australia.

The genus was erected in 2001 for a few species of Cisseis. Several new species were then described. These beetles are less than a centimeter long. They are iridescent, often with colorful heads and bodies in shades of green or blue. Male and female are sometimes dimorphic. They are associated with Australian plants such as Grevillea, Hakea, Casuarina, and Allocasuarina.

Species include:

- Stanwatkinsius amanda Barker, 2007
- Stanwatkinsius careniceps (Carter, 1923)
- Stanwatkinsius cinctus (Kerremans, 1898)
- Stanwatkinsius constrictus (Blackburn, 1887)
- Stanwatkinsius crassus Barker & Bellamy, 2001
- Stanwatkinsius demarzi Barker & Bellamy, 2001
- Stanwatkinsius grevilleae Barker & Bellamy, 2001
- Stanwatkinsius kermeti Barker & Bellamy, 2001
- Stanwatkinsius lindi (Blackburn, 1887)
- Stanwatkinsius macmillani Barker & Bellamy, 2001
- Stanwatkinsius perplexa (Blackburn, 1887)
- Stanwatkinsius powelli Barker & Bellamy, 2001
- Stanwatkinsius rhodopus Barker & Bellamy, 2001
- Stanwatkinsius speciosus Barker & Bellamy, 2001
- Stanwatkinsius subcarinifrons (Thomson, 1879)
- Stanwatkinsius uniformis (Thomson, 1879)
- Stanwatkinsius viridimarginalis Barker & Bellamy, 2001
