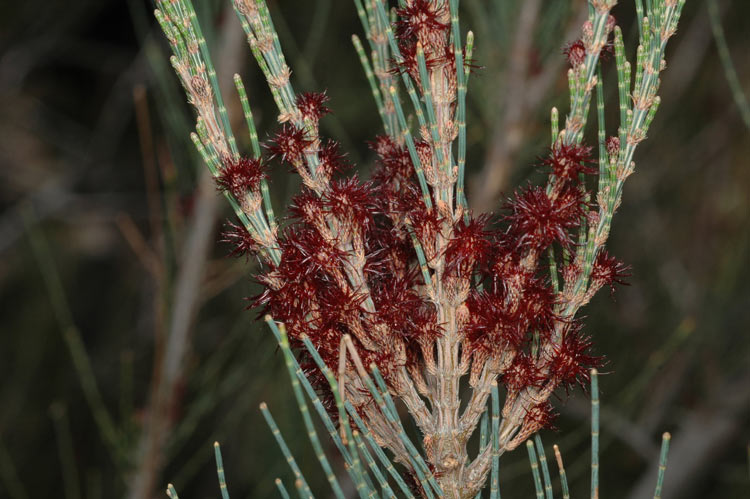
- Immature female cones

Scientific classification
- Kingdom: Plantae
- Clade: Tracheophytes
- Clade: Angiosperms
- Clade: Eudicots
- Clade: Rosids
- Order: Fagales
- Family: Casuarinaceae
- Genus: Allocasuarina
- Species: A. zephyrea

Binomial name
- Allocasuarina zephyrea L.A.S.Johnson
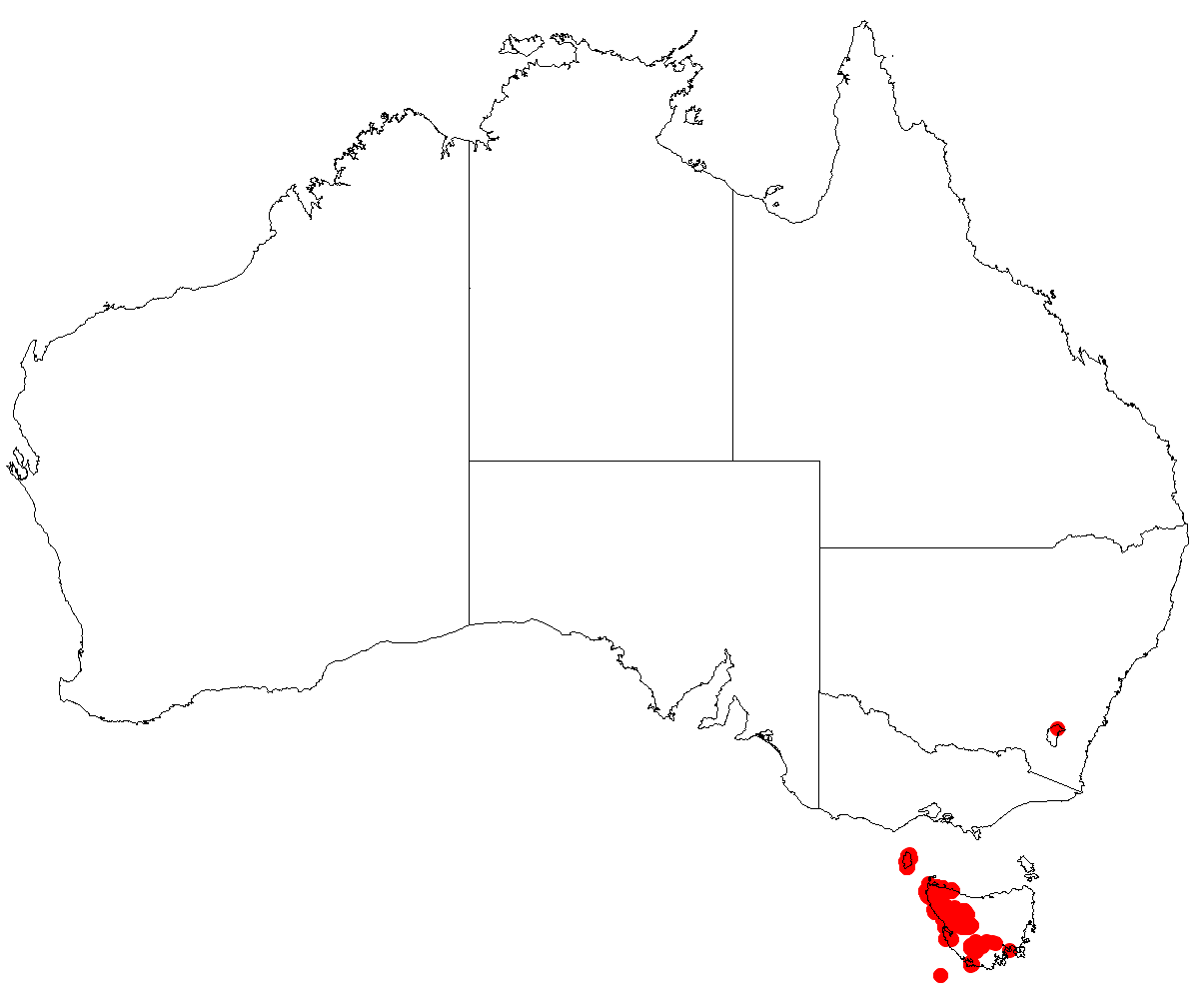
- Occurrence data from AVH

= Allocasuarina zephyrea =

Species of plant

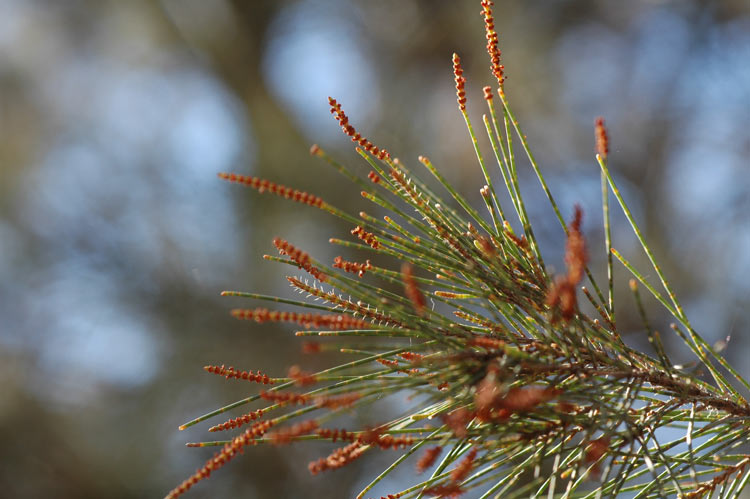
Male spikes

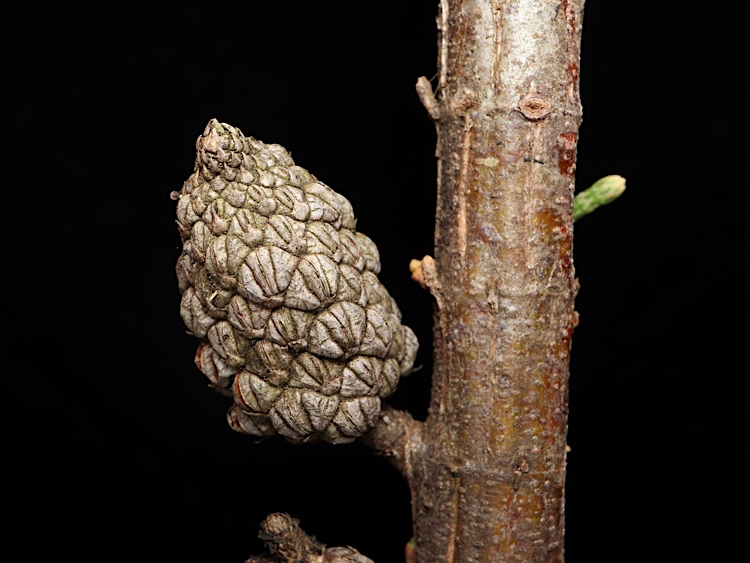
Male cone

Allocasuarina zephyrea is a species of flowering plant in the family Casuarinaceae and is endemic to Tasmania. It is a dioecious shrub that has branchlets up to 190 mm (7.5 in) long, the leaves reduced to scales in whorls of seven to nine or ten, the fruiting cones 10–25 mm (0.39–0.98 in) long containing winged seeds 4.0–5.5 mm (0.16–0.22 in) long.

== Description ==
Allocasuarina zephyrea is a dioecious shrub that typically grows to a height of 0.5–2 m (1 ft 8 in – 6 ft 7 in). Its branchlets are up to 190 mm (7.5 in) long, the leaves reduced to scale-like teeth 0.4–1.2 mm (0.016–0.047 in) long, arranged in whorls of seven to nine or ten around the branchlets. The sections of branchlet between the leaf whorls are 4–15 mm (0.16–0.59 in) long, 0.6–1.3 mm (0.024–0.051 in) wide. Male flowers are arranged in spikes 10–35 mm (0.39–1.38 in) long, with 5 to 7 whorls per centimetre (per 0.39 in.), the anthers 0.7–0.9 mm (0.028–0.035 in) long. Female cones are on a peduncle 2–15 mm (0.079–0.591 in) long, and mature cones 10–25 mm (0.39–0.98 in) long and 6–11 mm (0.24–0.43 in) in diameter, containing black, winged seeds 4.0–5.5 mm (0.16–0.22 in) long. This allocasuarina is similar to A. grampiana.

== Taxonomy ==
Allocasuarina zephyrea was first formally described in 1989 by the botanist Lawrence Alexander Sidney Johnson in the Flora of Australia at Ocean Beach near Strahan in 1949. The specific epithet (zephyrea) means "west wind", referring to the species' occurrence on the western side of Tasmania.

== Habitat and distribution ==
Allocasuarina zephyrea is endemic to Tasmania, growing in woodland, heath, sedgeland and on rocky outcrops from the western lowlands to central and south-eastern highlands, as well as on King Island.
