= Acacia gibsonii =

Gibson's wattle

Conservation status
- Priority One — Poorly Known Taxa (DEC)

Scientific classification
- Kingdom: Plantae
- Clade: Tracheophytes
- Clade: Angiosperms
- Clade: Eudicots
- Clade: Rosids
- Order: Fabales
- Family: Fabaceae
- Subfamily: Caesalpinioideae
- Clade: Mimosoid clade
- Genus: Acacia
- Species: A. gibsonii

Binomial name
- Acacia gibsonii Maslin

Species of legume

Acacia gibsonii, commonly known as Gibson's wattle, is a species of flowering plant in the family Fabaceae and is endemic to a restricted area of Western Australia. It is a low, spreading, somewhat straggly shrub with terete, reddish brown branchlets, oblong phyllodes, spikes of pale yellow flowers and tightly coiled, thinly leathery pods prominently rounded over the seeds.

== Description ==
Acacia gibsonii is a low, spreading, somewhat straggly shrub that typically grows to 0.5 m (1 ft 8 in) high and to 1.5 m (4 ft 11 in) wide. Its branchlets are terete, glabrous and reddish brown aging to light grey. The phyllodes are oblong, sometimes slightly s-shaped, 5–13 mm (0.20–0.51 in) long, 1.5–3 mm (0.059–0.118 in) wide and glabrous, apart from minute, red-brown glandular hairs on the veins and edges of most phyllodes. There are three prominent veins on each face of the phyllodes. The flowers are golden yellow and borne in a more or less sessile spike 5–7 mm (0.20–0.28 in) long in axils. Flowering occurs from September to October and the pods are tightly coiled, thinly leathery, about 12 mm (0.47 in) long, glabrous and brown. The seeds are oblong, 2.0–2.5 mm (0.079–0.098 in) long, 1.5 mm (0.059 in) wide, compressed and black with a cap-shaped, creamy white aril that is only slightly shorter than the seed.

== Taxonomy ==
Acacia gibsonii was first formally described in 2013 by Bruce Maslin in the journal Nuytsia from specimens collected by Neil Gibson, south of the Hyden-Norseman road in 2012. The specific epithet (gibsonii) honours "Dr Neil Gibson, Principal Research Scientist with the Department of Parks and Wildlife".

== Distribution ==
This species of wattle is only known from the type location where it is reasonably common in red loam on gentle rocky slopes in shrubland dominated by Allocasuarina campestris, Allocasuarina globosa and Calothamnus quadrifidus, in the Coolgardie bioregion of Western Australia.

== Conservation status ==
Acacia gibsonii is listed as "Priority One" by the Government of Western Australia Department of Biodiversity, Conservation and Attractions, meaning that it is known from only one or a few locations where it is potentially at risk.

== See also ==
- List of Acacia species
