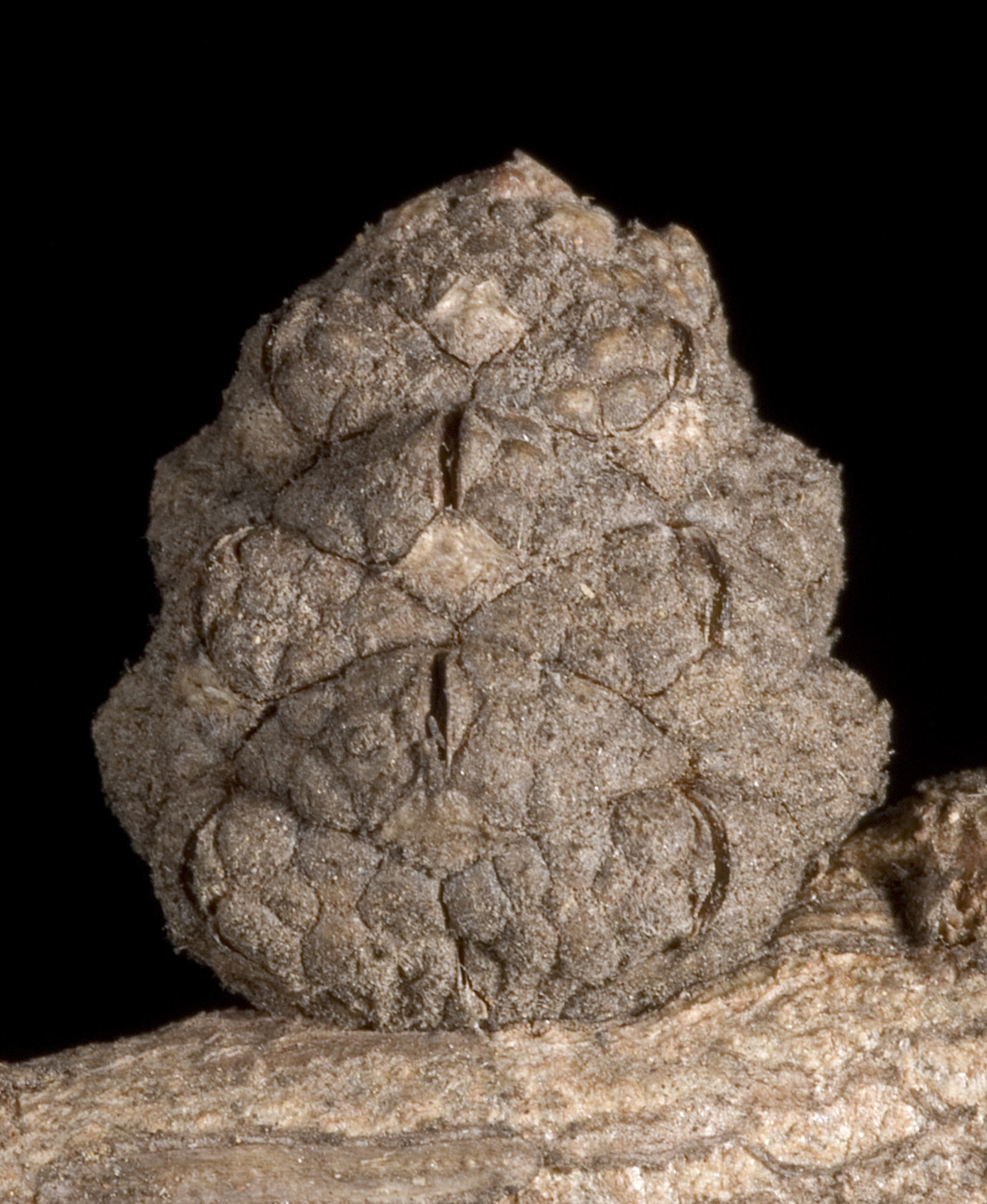

Scientific classification
- Kingdom: Plantae
- Clade: Tracheophytes
- Clade: Angiosperms
- Clade: Eudicots
- Clade: Rosids
- Order: Fagales
- Family: Casuarinaceae
- Genus: Allocasuarina
- Species: A. microstachya

Binomial name
- Allocasuarina microstachya (Miq.) L.A.S.Johnson
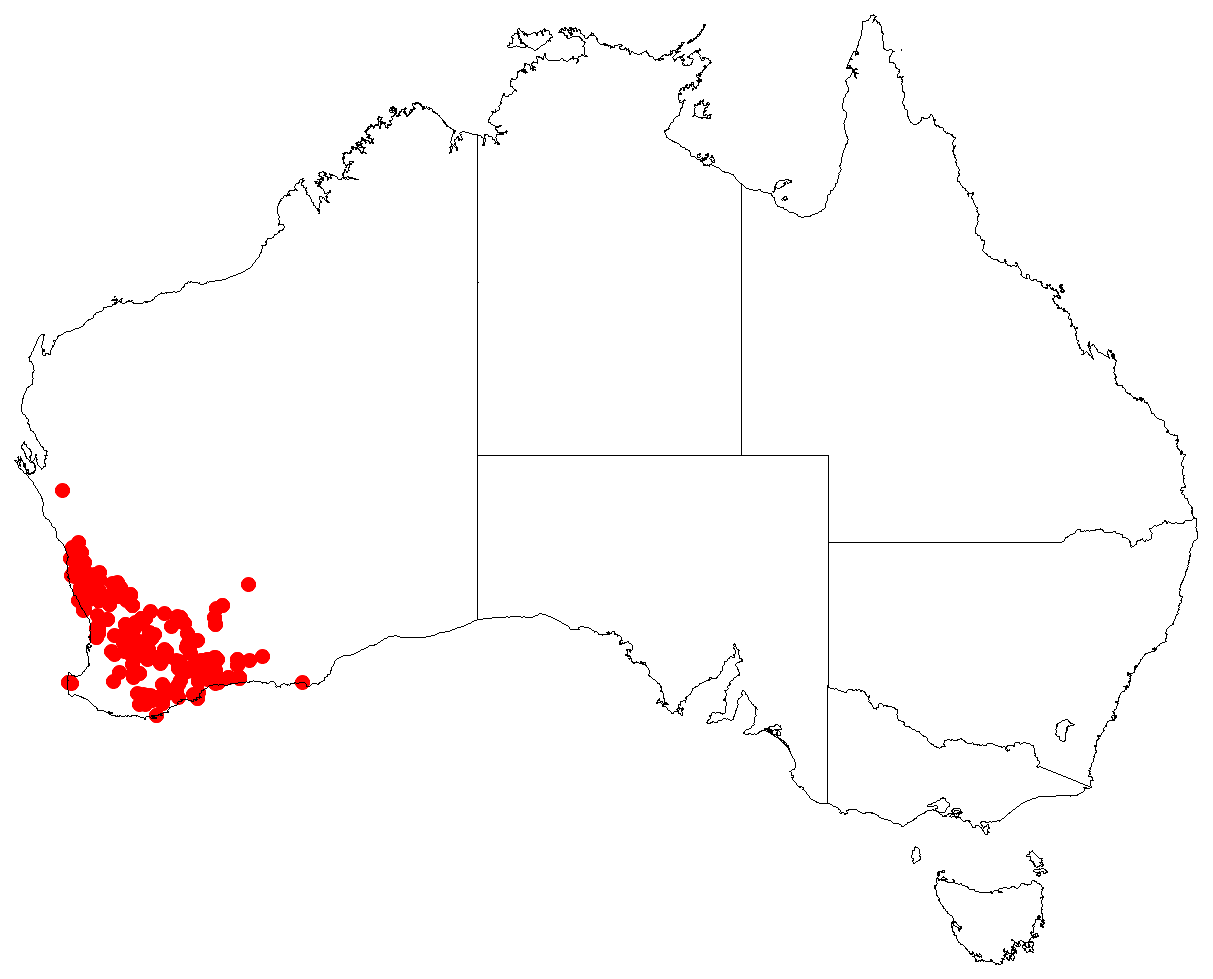
- Occurrence data from AVH

Synonyms
- Casuarina microstachya Miq.

= Allocasuarina microstachya =

Species of flowering plant

Allocasuarina microstachya is a species of flowering plant in the family Casuarinaceae and is endemic to the south-west of Western Australia. It is dioecious shrub that has its leaves reduced to scales in whorls of four, the mature fruiting cones 8–12 mm (0.31–0.47 in) long containing winged seeds 2.5–5.0 mm (0.098–0.197 in) long.

== Description ==
Allocasuarina microstachya is a dioecious, intricately branched shrub that typically grows to a height of 0.1–1 m (3.9 in – 3 ft 3.4 in). Its branchlets are up to 50 mm (2.0 in) long, the leaves reduced to scale-like teeth 0.4–1.3 mm (0.016–0.051 in) long, arranged in whorls of four around the needle-like branchlets. The sections of branchlet between the leaf whorls are mostly 2–6 mm (0.079–0.236 in) long, 0.6–0.8 mm (0.024–0.031 in) wide and more or less square in cross-section. Male flowers are arranged in spikes 1.5–3 mm (0.059–0.118 in) long, the anthers 0.5–0.6 mm (0.020–0.024 in) long. Female cones are sessile, the mature cones shortly cylindrical to oval, 8–12 mm (0.31–0.47 in) long and 5–10 mm (0.20–0.39 in) in diameter containing black, hairy, winged seeds 2.5–5.0 mm (0.098–0.197 in) long.

== Taxonomy ==
This sheoak was first formally described in 1845 by Friedrich Anton Wilhelm Miquel who gave it the name Casuarina microstachya in Lehmann's Plantae Preissianae from specimens collected by Ludwig Preiss in 1839. It was reclassified in 1982 as Allocasuarina microstachya by Lawrie Johnson in the Journal of the Adelaide Botanic Gardens. The specific epithet (microstachya) means "small flower spike".

== Distribution and habitat ==
Allocasuarina microstachya grows in heath in sand, laterite or gravel and is widely distributed in the southwest of Western Australia, from near Geraldton to Albany and the Munglinup River east of Ravensthorpe.

== Conservation status ==
Allocasuarina microstachya is listed as "not threatened" by the Western Australian Government Department of Biodiversity, Conservation and Attractions.
