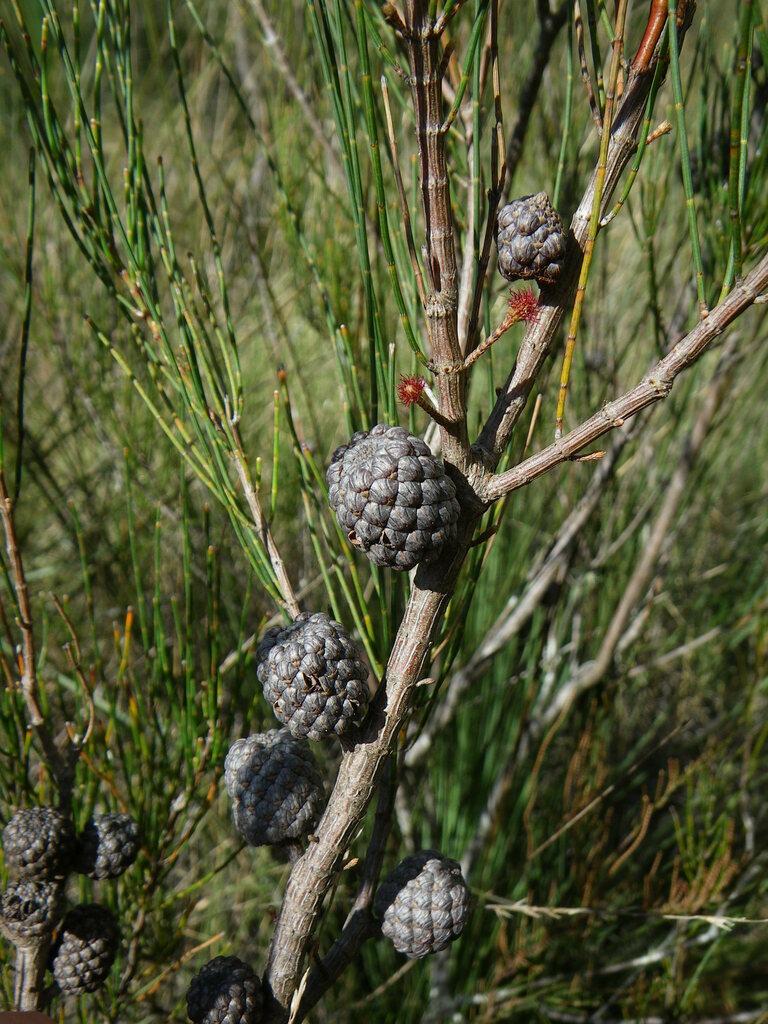

Scientific classification
- Kingdom: Plantae
- Clade: Tracheophytes
- Clade: Angiosperms
- Clade: Eudicots
- Clade: Rosids
- Order: Fagales
- Family: Casuarinaceae
- Genus: Allocasuarina
- Species: A. ophiolitica

Binomial name
- Allocasuarina ophiolitica L.A.S.Johnson
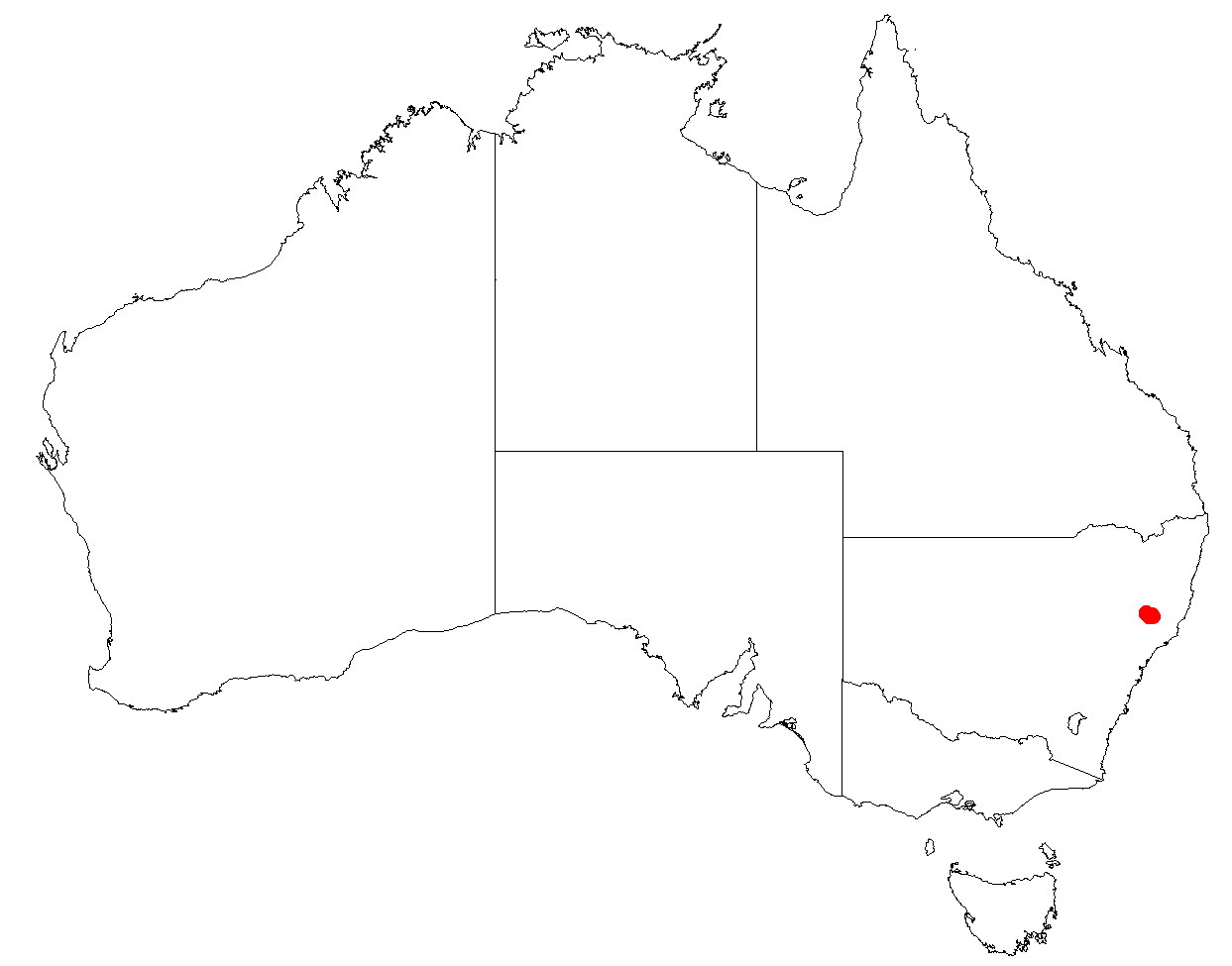
- Occurrence data from AVH

= Allocasuarina ophiolitica =

Species of flowering plant

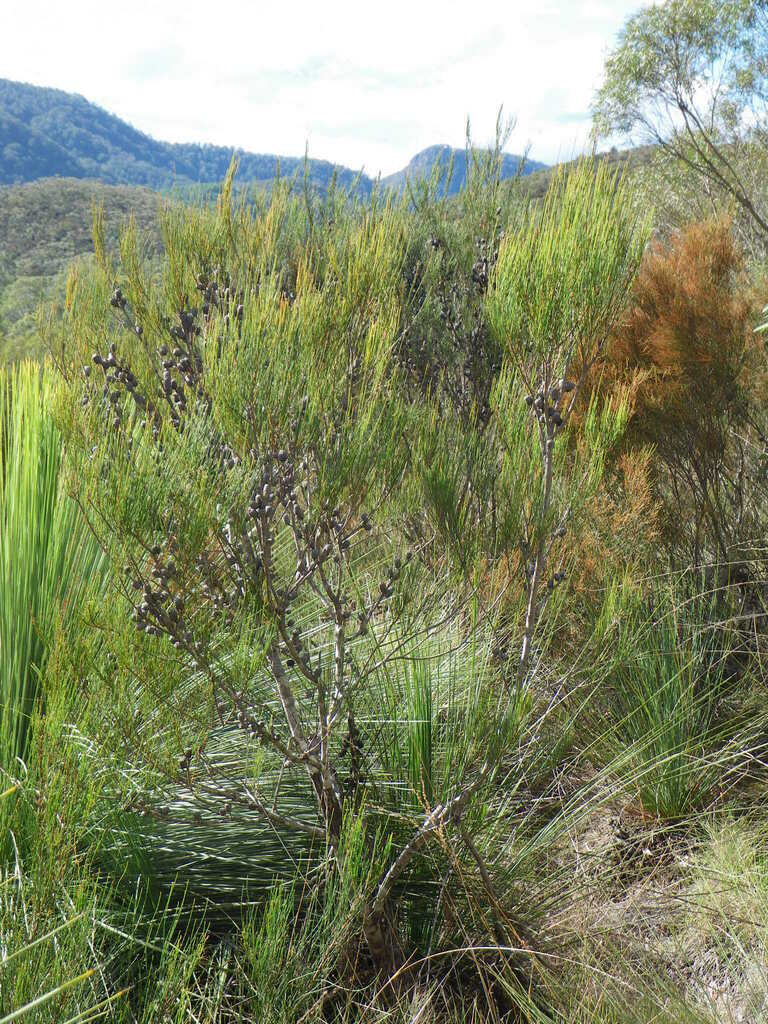
Habit near Curricabark in Barrington Tops

Allocasuarina ophiolitica is a species of flowering plant in the family Casuarinaceae and is endemic to a small area of eastern New South Wales. It is a dioecious shrub with branchlets up to 190 mm (7.5 in) long, the leaves reduced to scales in whorls of seven to nine, the fruiting cones 9–20 mm (0.35–0.79 in) long containing winged seeds 3.5–6.0 mm (0.14–0.24 in) long.

== Description ==
Allocasuarina ophiolitica is a dioecious shrub that typically grows to a height of 1–3 m (3 ft 3 in – 9 ft 10 in). Its branchlets are up to 190 mm (7.5 in) long, the leaves reduced to erect or slightly spreading, scale-like teeth 0.5–1.3 mm (0.020–0.051 in) long, arranged in whorls of seven to nine around the branchlets. The sections of branchlet between the leaf whorls are 7–14 mm (0.28–0.55 in) long and 0.6–1 mm (0.024–0.039 in) wide. Male flowers are arranged in spikes 10–25 mm (0.39–0.98 in) long, with about six whorls per centimetre (per 0.39 in.), the anthers 0.8–1.2 mm (0.031–0.047 in) long. Female cones are borne on a peduncle 3–15 mm (0.12–0.59 in) long, the mature cones 9–20 mm (0.35–0.79 in) long and 7–12 mm (0.28–0.47 in) in diameter, the winged seeds brown and 3.5–6.0 mm (0.14–0.24 in) long.

== Taxonomy ==
Allocasuarina ophiolitica was first described in 1989 by Lawrie Johnson in Flora of Australia. The specific epithet, (ophiolitica) means "serpent stone", referring to the species occurrence only on serpentinite.

== Distribution and habitat ==
This she-oak grows on serpentinite rocks in tall heath and low woodland on the southern end of the Northern Tablelands and nearby coastal ranges in eastern New South Wales.
