= Allocasuarina striata =

Scientific classification
- Kingdom: Plantae
- Clade: Tracheophytes
- Clade: Angiosperms
- Clade: Eudicots
- Clade: Rosids
- Order: Fagales
- Family: Casuarinaceae
- Genus: Allocasuarina
- Species: A. striata

Binomial name
- Allocasuarina striata (Macklin) L.A.S.Johnson
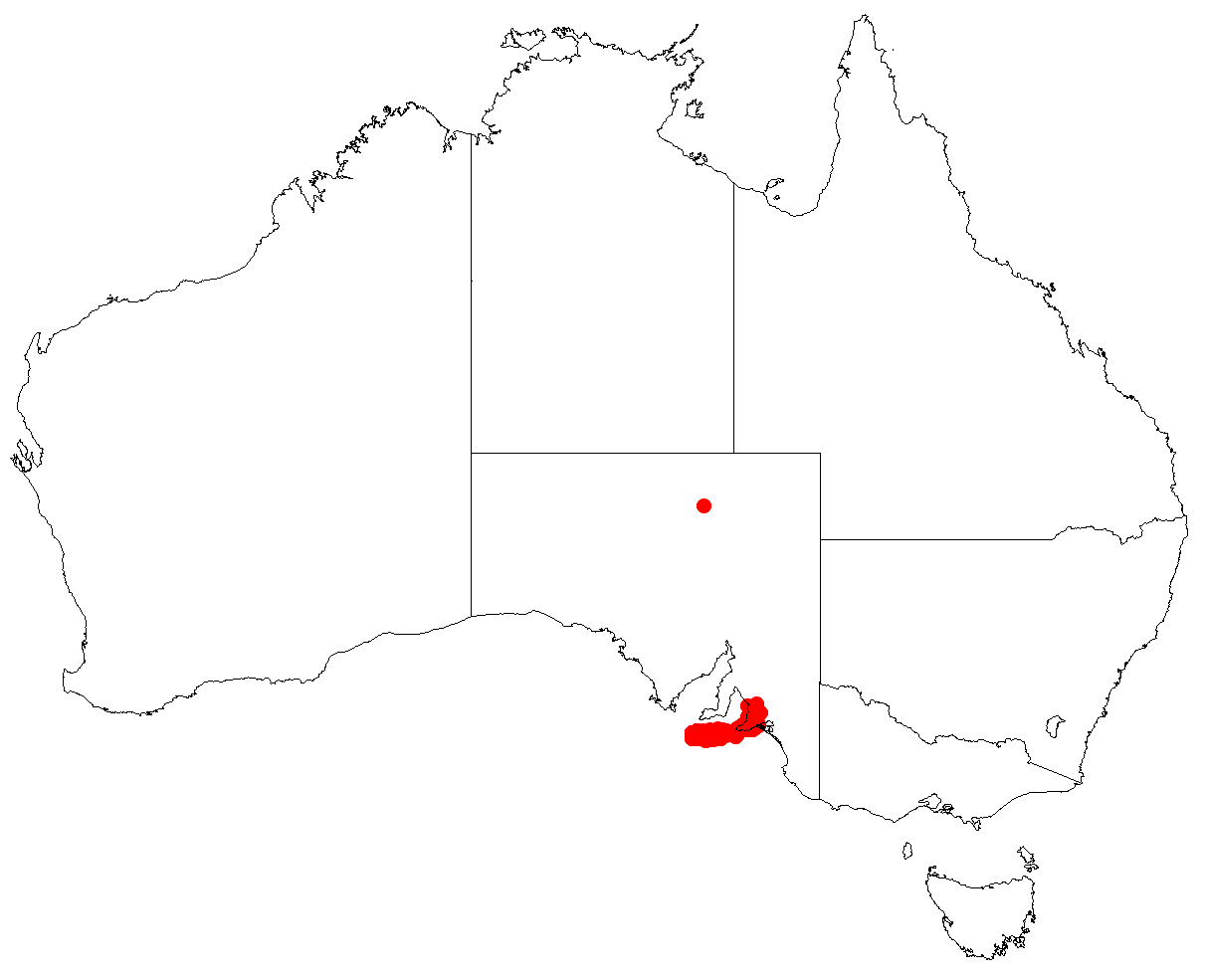
- Occurrence data from AVH

Species of plant

Allocasuarina striata, commonly known as the small bull oak, stalked oak-bush or the tall oak-bush, is a shrub of the genus Allocasuarina native to South Australia.

== Description ==
The shrub or small tree typically grows to a height of 1.5 to 2.5 metres (5 to 8 ft) but can reach as high as 4 m (13 ft) and a width of 1 to 1.5 m (3 to 5 ft). It has a dense, erect and rounded habit, with smooth bark that becomes fissured on older trees. The dioecious or monoecious has terete, smooth, striated stem segments to 2 centimetres (0.8 in) long with seven reduced leaves around the end. The male flower spikes grow to 3 cm (1.2 in) in length with a slender form and having with 5-7 whorls per centimetre. The female flower is yellow-brown in colour and 1.3 millimetres (0.05 in) long. Fruits that form later are small and woody cylindrical cones containing numerous valves with smooth semi-flat black seeds that have a papery wing.

== Distribution ==
Endemic to South Australia the species is confined to an area in the south east of the state on the southern Mount Lofty Ranges, the Fleurieu Peninsula and on Kangaroo Island. It grows in heath and sandy lateritic soils. When cultivated it grows best in full sun or part shade and is found on hills, footslopes and plains. It will tolerate drought, moderate frost and soil salinity.

== Uses ==
A hardy foliage plant it is often grown as a low informal hedge in roadside verges and raised beds. Used in reserves and parks as a soil binding plant for reserves which also provides bird habitat and refuge for small animals and acts as a windbreak. Aboriginal peoples used the plant for food, medicine, to make implements like boomerangs and shields, and to make adhesives for canoe sealant.

== Classification ==
The species was first formally described as Casuarina striata by the botanist Ellen D. Macklin in 1927. It was later reclassified by Lawrence Alexander Sidney Johnson into the Allocasuarina genera in 1982 in the article Notes on Casuarinaceae II in the Journal of the Adelaide Botanic Gardens.
