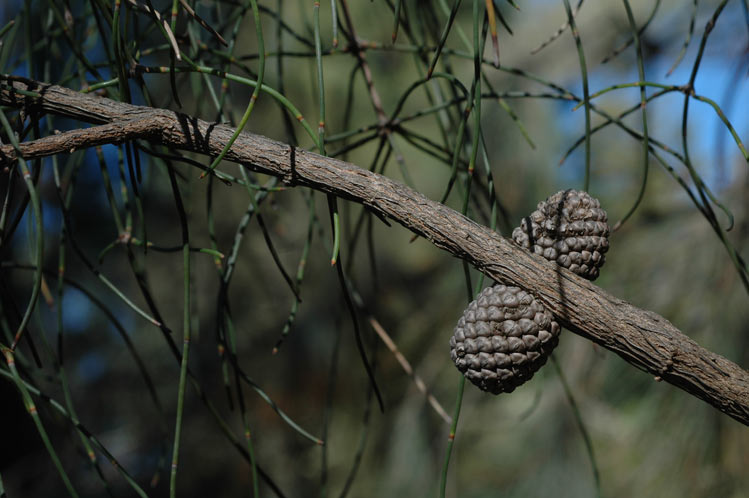
- In the Australian National Botanic Gardens

Scientific classification
- Kingdom: Plantae
- Clade: Tracheophytes
- Clade: Angiosperms
- Clade: Eudicots
- Clade: Rosids
- Order: Fagales
- Family: Casuarinaceae
- Genus: Allocasuarina
- Species: A. scleroclada

Binomial name
- Allocasuarina scleroclada (L.A.S.Johnson) L.A.S.Johnson
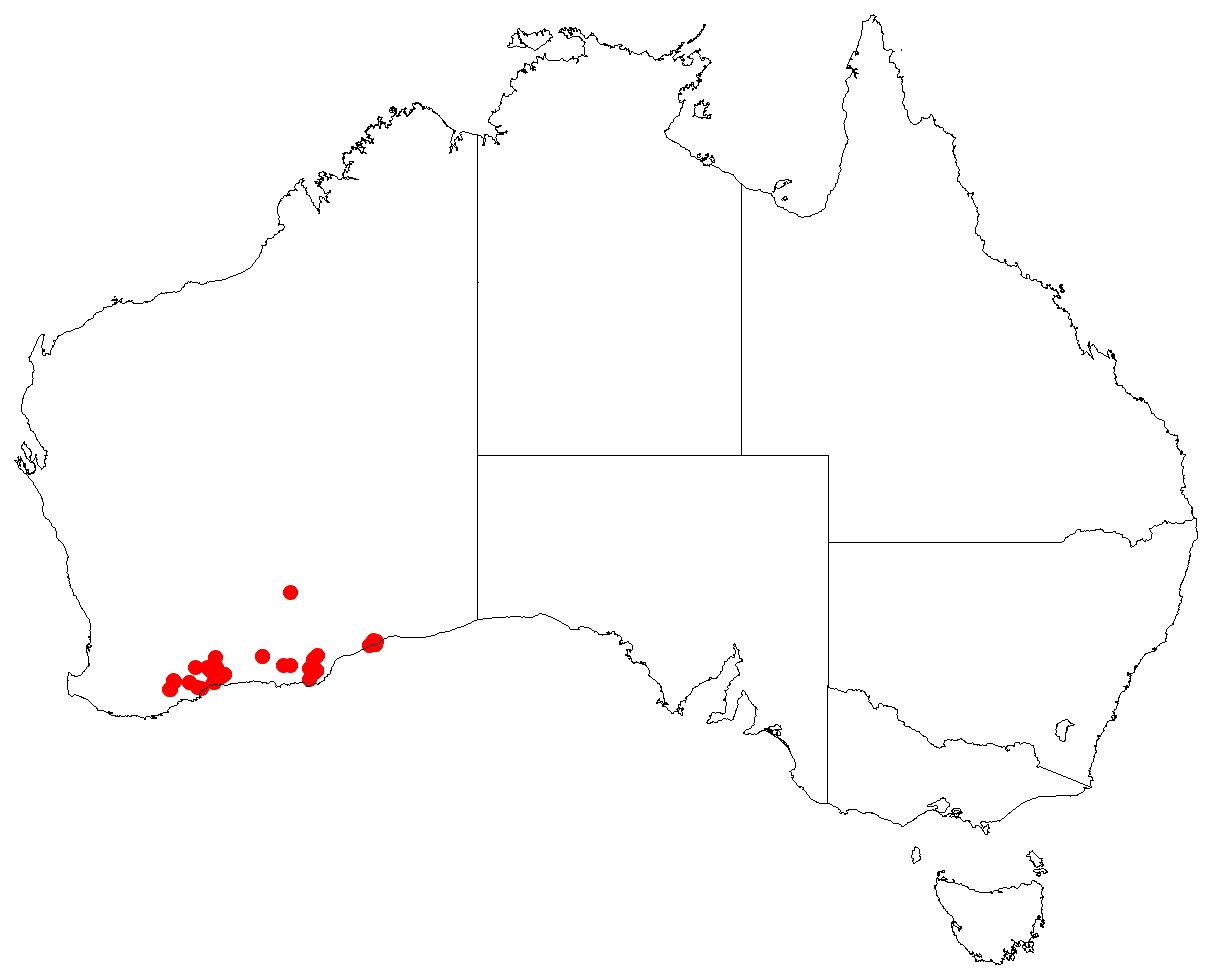
- Occurrence data from AVH

= Allocasuarina scleroclada =

Species of flowering plant

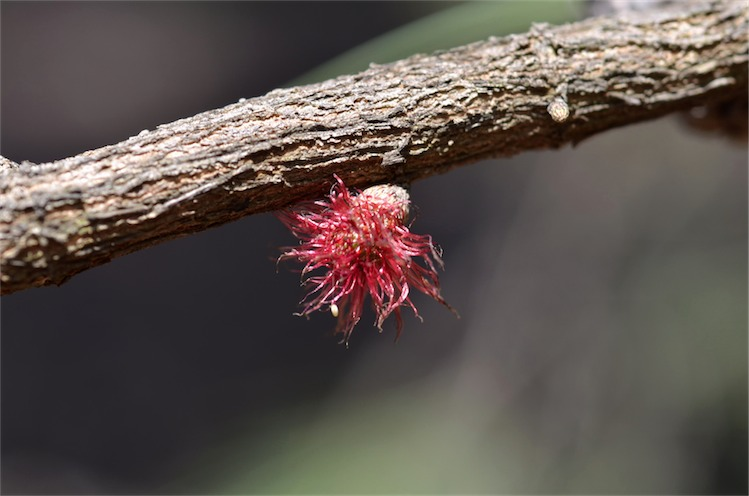
Immature female cone

Allocasuarina scleroclada is a species of flowering plant in the family Casuarinaceae and is endemic to areas along the south coast of Western Australia. It is a straggly, dioecious shrub that has branchlets up to 230 mm (9.1 in) long, the leaves reduced to scales in whorls of ten or eleven, the mature fruiting cones 18–25 mm (0.71–0.98 in) long containing winged seeds 5–8 mm (0.20–0.31 in) long.

== Description ==
Allocasuarina scleroclada is a straggly, dioecious shrub that typically grows to a height of 1–3 m (3 ft 3 in – 9 ft 10 in). Its branchlets are up to 230 mm (9.1 in) long and drooping, the leaves reduced to scale-like teeth 1.3–2.7 mm (0.051–0.106 in) long, arranged in whorls of ten or eleven around the branchlets. The sections of branchlet between the leaf whorls are 20–52 mm (0.79–2.05 in) long, 1.0–1.5 mm (0.039–0.059 in) wide. Male flowers are arranged in spikes 6–16 mm (0.24–0.63 in) long, the anthers 0.5–0.8 mm (0.020–0.031 in) long. Female cones are sessile and glabrous, the mature cones more or less cylindrical, 18–25 mm (0.71–0.98 in) long and 13–19 mm (0.51–0.75 in) in diameter, containing black, winged seeds 5–8 mm (0.20–0.31 in) long.

== Taxonomy ==
This she-aok was first formally described in 1972 by Lawrie Johnson, who gave it the name Casuarina scleroclada in the journal Nuytsia, from specimens he collected near Caiguna in 1967. In 1982, Johnson transferred the species to Allocasuarina as A. scleroclada in the Journal of the Adelaide Botanic Gardens. The specific epithet, (scleroclada) means "hard branch".

== Distribution and habitat ==
Allocasuarina scleroclada grows in scrub and low woodland, on rocky hillsides and on limestone shelves near the sea. It occurs in scattered places along the coast of Western Australia between Borden and the western part of the Great Australian Bight in the Coolgardie, Esperance Plains and Mallee bioregions of southern Western Australia.
