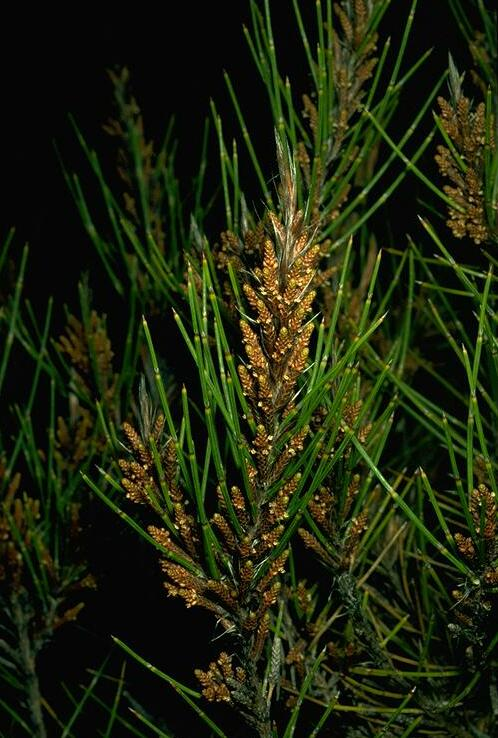
- Branchlets and male spikes

Conservation status
- Vulnerable (EPBC Act)

Scientific classification
- Kingdom: Plantae
- Clade: Tracheophytes
- Clade: Angiosperms
- Clade: Eudicots
- Clade: Rosids
- Order: Fagales
- Family: Casuarinaceae
- Genus: Allocasuarina
- Species: A. fibrosa

Binomial name
- Allocasuarina fibrosa (C.A.Gardner) L.A.S.Johnson

Synonyms
- Casuarina fibrosa C.A.Gardner

= Allocasuarina fibrosa =

Species of flowering plant

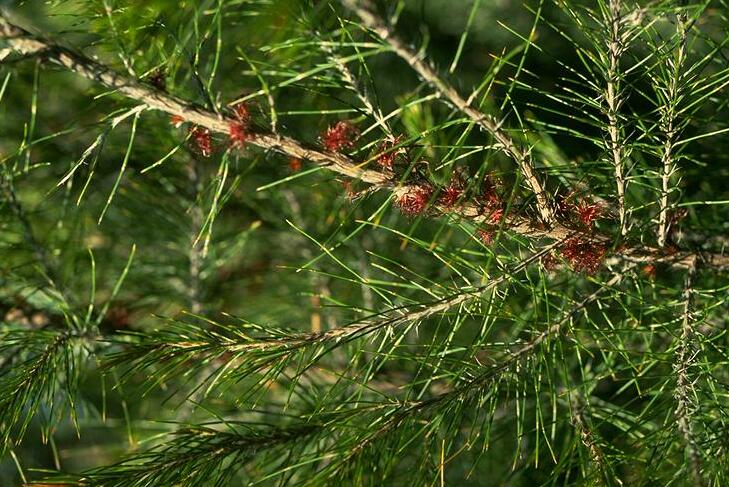
Immature female cones

Allocasuarina fibrosa, commonly known as woolly sheoak, is a species of flowering plant in the family Casuarinaceae and is endemic to the south-west of Western Australia. It is a dioecious shrub that has branchlets 20–50 mm (0.79–1.97 in) long, the leaves reduced to scales in whorls of four, and the mature fruiting cones 11–25 mm (0.43–0.98 in) long containing winged seeds (samaras) 6–7 mm (0.24–0.28 in) long.

== Description ==
Allocasuarina fibrosa is a dioecious shrub that typically grows to a height of 0.5–1.5 m (1 ft 8 in – 4 ft 11 in). Its branchlets are 20–50 mm (0.79–1.97 in) long, the leaves reduced to erect, scale-like teeth 1.5–2.0 mm (0.059–0.079 in) long, arranged in whorls of four around the branchlets. The sections of branchlet between the leaf whorls (the "articles") are 8–16 mm (0.31–0.63 in) long. Male flowers are arranged in spikes 4–7 mm (0.16–0.28 in) long, the anthers 0.5–0.6 mm (0.020–0.024 in) long. Female cones are more or less cylindrical to spherical and covered with hairs, mature cones 11–25 mm (0.43–0.98 in) long and 9–11 mm (0.35–0.43 in) in diameter, often with awn-like projections up to 2 mm (0.079 in) long. The samaras brown to black and 6–7 mm (0.24–0.28 in) long. Flowering occurs in July and August. This sheoak is similar to Allocasuarina grevilleoides.

== Taxonomy ==
This species was first formally described in 1928 by Charles Gardner who gave it the name Casuarina fibrosa in the Journal of the Royal Society of Western Australia, from specimens he collected near Tammin in 1926. It was reclassified in 1982 as Allocasuarina fibrosa by Lawrie Johnson in the Journal of the Adelaide Botanic Gardens. The specific epithet (fibrosa) refers to the long fibres on the cones.

== Distribution and habitat ==
Woolly sheoak grows in tall, open heath in sandy soil over laterite and is only known from several populations near Tammin and Quairading in the Avon Wheatbelt bioregion of south-western Western Australia.

== Conservation status ==
Allocasuarina fibrosa is listed as "vulnerable" under the Australian Government Environment Protection and Biodiversity Conservation Act 1999 and as "Threatened" by the Western Australian Government Department of Biodiversity, Conservation and Attractions, meaning that it is in danger of extinction.
