= Allocasuarina anfractuosa =

Conservation status
- Priority One — Poorly Known Taxa (DEC)

Scientific classification
- Kingdom: Plantae
- Clade: Tracheophytes
- Clade: Angiosperms
- Clade: Eudicots
- Clade: Rosids
- Order: Fagales
- Family: Casuarinaceae
- Genus: Allocasuarina
- Species: A. anfractuosa

Binomial name
- Allocasuarina anfractuosa Wege & S.R.Barrett

Species of flowering plant

Allocasuarina anfractuosa, commonly known as sinuous sheoak, is a species of flowering plant in the family Casuarinaceae and is endemic to a restricted area in the southwest of Western Australia. It is a bushy, monoecious shrub that has spreading, sinuous branchlets, the leaves reduced to scales in whorls of 11 to 15, the fruiting cones 28–35 mm (1.1–1.4 in) long containing winged seeds (samaras) 10–12 mm (0.39–0.47 in) long.

== Description ==
Allocasuarina anfractuosa is a bushy, monoecious shrub that typically grows to a height of up to about 1.5 m (4 ft 11 in). Its branchlets are spreading, up to 50–200 mm (2.0–7.9 in) long and sinuous, the leaves reduced to erect or spreading, scale-like teeth 0.6–1.1 mm (0.024–0.043 in) long, arranged in whorls of 11 to 15 around the branchlets. The sections of branchlet between the leaf whorls (the "articles") are 7–27 mm (0.28–1.06 in) long and 0.9–1.5 mm (0.035–0.059 in) wide. Male flowers are arranged in head-like spikes 3.5–4.5 mm (0.14–0.18 in) long on the ends of branchlets, the anthers 0.8–1 mm (0.031–0.039 in) long. Female cones are covered with fine, white or dark yellowish hairs when young, and are sessile or on a peduncle up to 5 mm (0.20 in) long. Flowering has been observed in August and mature cones are more or less cylindrical, 28–35 mm (1.1–1.4 in) long and 28–30 mm (1.1–1.2 in) in diameter, the samaras dark brown and 10–12 mm (0.39–0.47 in) long.

== Taxonomy ==
Allocasuarina anfractuosa was first formally described in 2016 by Juliet Wege and Sarah Barrett in the journal Nuytsia from specimens collected by Barrett near the Pallinup River in 2014. The specific epithet, (anfractuosa) means "sinuous", referring to the branchlets.

== Distribution and habitat ==
Sinuous sheoak grows in heath where it often forms dense stands, and is only known from a small area north-west of Boxwood Hill in the Esperance Plains bioregion of south-western Western Australia.

== Conservation status ==
Allocasuarina anfractuosa is listed as "Priority One" by the Government of Western Australia Department of Biodiversity, Conservation and Attractions, meaning that it is known from only one or a few locations that are potentially at risk.
