= Allocasuarina defungens =

Conservation status
- Endangered (EPBC Act)

Scientific classification
- Kingdom: Plantae
- Clade: Tracheophytes
- Clade: Angiosperms
- Clade: Eudicots
- Clade: Rosids
- Order: Fagales
- Family: Casuarinaceae
- Genus: Allocasuarina
- Species: A. defungens

Binomial name
- Allocasuarina defungens L.A.S.Johnson
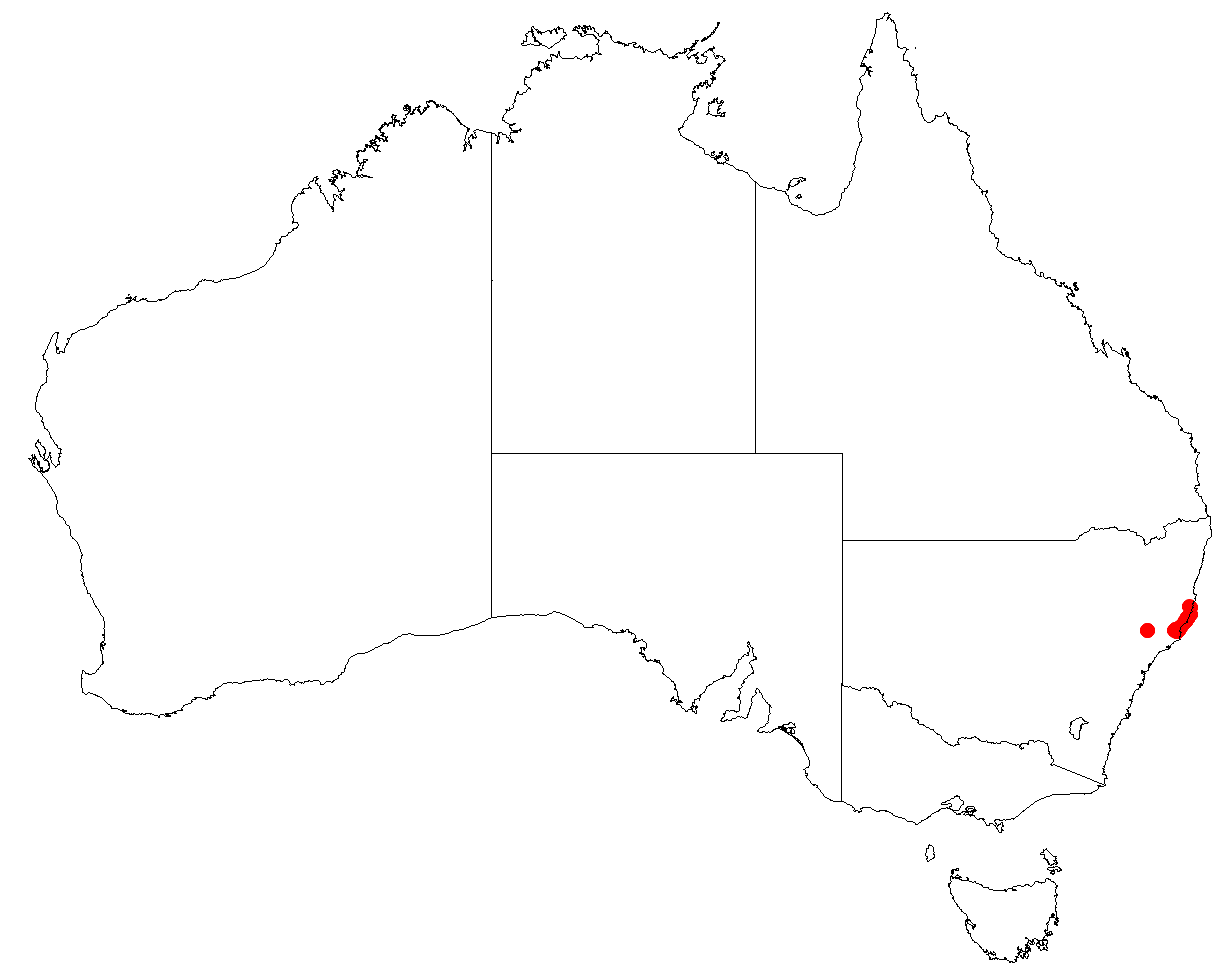
- Occurrence data from AVH

Species of tree

Allocasuarina defungens, commonly known as dwarf heath casuarina, is a species of flowering plant in the family Casuarinaceae and is endemic to a restricted area of New South Wales. It is a straggly, dioecious or monoecious shrub that has branchlets up to 120 mm (4.7 in) long, the leaves reduced to scales in whorls of five to seven, the fruiting cones 8–11 mm (0.31–0.43 in) long containing winged seeds (samaras) about 3 mm (0.12 in) long.

== Description ==
Allocasuarina defungens is a straggly, more or less erect, dioecious or monoecious shrub that forms a lignotuber, and typically grows to a height of 0.5–2 m (1 ft 8 in – 6 ft 7 in). Its branchlets are more or less erect, up to 120 mm (4.7 in) long, the leaves reduced to erect, scale-like teeth 0.2–0.5 mm (0.0079–0.0197 in) long, arranged in whorls of five to seven around the branchlets. The sections of branchlet between the leaf whorls (the "articles") are 6–8 mm (0.24–0.31 in) long and 0.5–0.6 mm (0.020–0.024 in) wide. Male flowers are arranged in head-like spikes 4–10 mm (0.16–0.39 in) long, the anthers 0.7–0.9 mm (0.028–0.035 in) long. Female cones are cylindrical, on a peduncle 3–7 mm (0.12–0.28 in) long. Mature cones are 8–11 mm (0.31–0.43 in) long and 5–7 mm (0.20–0.28 in) in diameter, the samaras about 3 mm (0.12 in) long.

== Taxonomy ==
Allocasuarina defungens was first formally described in 1989 by Lawrie Johnson in the Flora of Australia from specimens collected by Bob Coveny near Nabiac airstrip in 1967. The specific epithet, (defungens) means "to finish" or "to die", referring the species' lack of vigour and "probable impending extinction".

== Distribution and habitat ==
Dwarf heath casuarina mainly grows in tall heath in coastal areas between Raymond Terrace and Byron Bay in eastern New South Wales.

== Conservation status ==
Allocasuarina defungens is listed as "endangered" under the Australian Government Environment Protection and Biodiversity Conservation Act 1999 and the new South Wales Government Biodiversity Conservation Act 2016. The main threats to the species are habitat disturbance caused by mining and housing development, and by inappropriate fire regimes.
