= Allocasuarina filidens =

Conservation status
- Vulnerable (NCA)

Scientific classification
- Kingdom: Plantae
- Clade: Tracheophytes
- Clade: Angiosperms
- Clade: Eudicots
- Clade: Rosids
- Order: Fagales
- Family: Casuarinaceae
- Genus: Allocasuarina
- Species: A. filidens

Binomial name
- Allocasuarina filidens L.A.S.Johnson

Species of plant

Allocasuarina filidens, commonly known as the Mt Beerwah she-oak, is a species of flowering plant in the family Casuarinaceae and is endemic to a restricted area of Queensland. It is a dioecious shrub that has more or less erect branchlets up to 200 mm (7.9 in) long, the leaves reduced to scales in whorls of five or six, the fruiting cones 14–30 mm (0.55–1.18 in) long containing winged seeds (samaras) 6.5–9 mm (0.26–0.35 in) long.

== Description ==
Allocasuarina filidens is a dioecious or monoecious shrub that typically grows to a height of 1.5–3 m (4 ft 11 in – 9 ft 10 in). Its branchlets are more or less erect, up to 200 mm (7.9 in) long, the leaves reduced to erect, scale-like teeth 1.5–2.0 mm (0.059–0.079 in) long, arranged in whorls of five or six around the branchlets. The sections of branchlet between the leaf whorls (the "articles") are 12–15 mm (0.47–0.59 in) long and 0.5–0.8 mm (0.020–0.031 in) wide. Female cones are cylindrical to barrel-shaped, on a peduncle 2–9 mm (0.079–0.354 in) long. Mature cones are 14–30 mm (0.55–1.18 in) long and 11–18 mm (0.43–0.71 in) in diameter, the samaras dark brown to black and 6.5–9 mm (0.26–0.35 in) long.

== Taxonomy ==
Allocasuarina filidens was first formally described in 1989 by Lawrie Johnson in the Flora of Australia from specimens collected by Stanley Blake on Mount Beerwah in 1966. The specific epithet, (filidens) means "thread-tooth", referring the long, slender "teeth".

== Distribution and habitat ==
Mt Beerwah she-oak grows in rock crevices on the upper slopes and mountain tops of the Glass House Mountains in south-eastern Queensland.

== Conservation status ==
Casuarina filidens is listed as "vulnerable" under the Queensland Government Nature Conservation Act 1992.
