= Allocasuarina robusta =

Conservation status
- Endangered (EPBC Act)

Scientific classification
- Kingdom: Plantae
- Clade: Tracheophytes
- Clade: Angiosperms
- Clade: Eudicots
- Clade: Rosids
- Order: Fagales
- Family: Casuarinaceae
- Genus: Allocasuarina
- Species: A. robusta

Binomial name
- Allocasuarina robusta (Macklin) L.A.S.Johnson
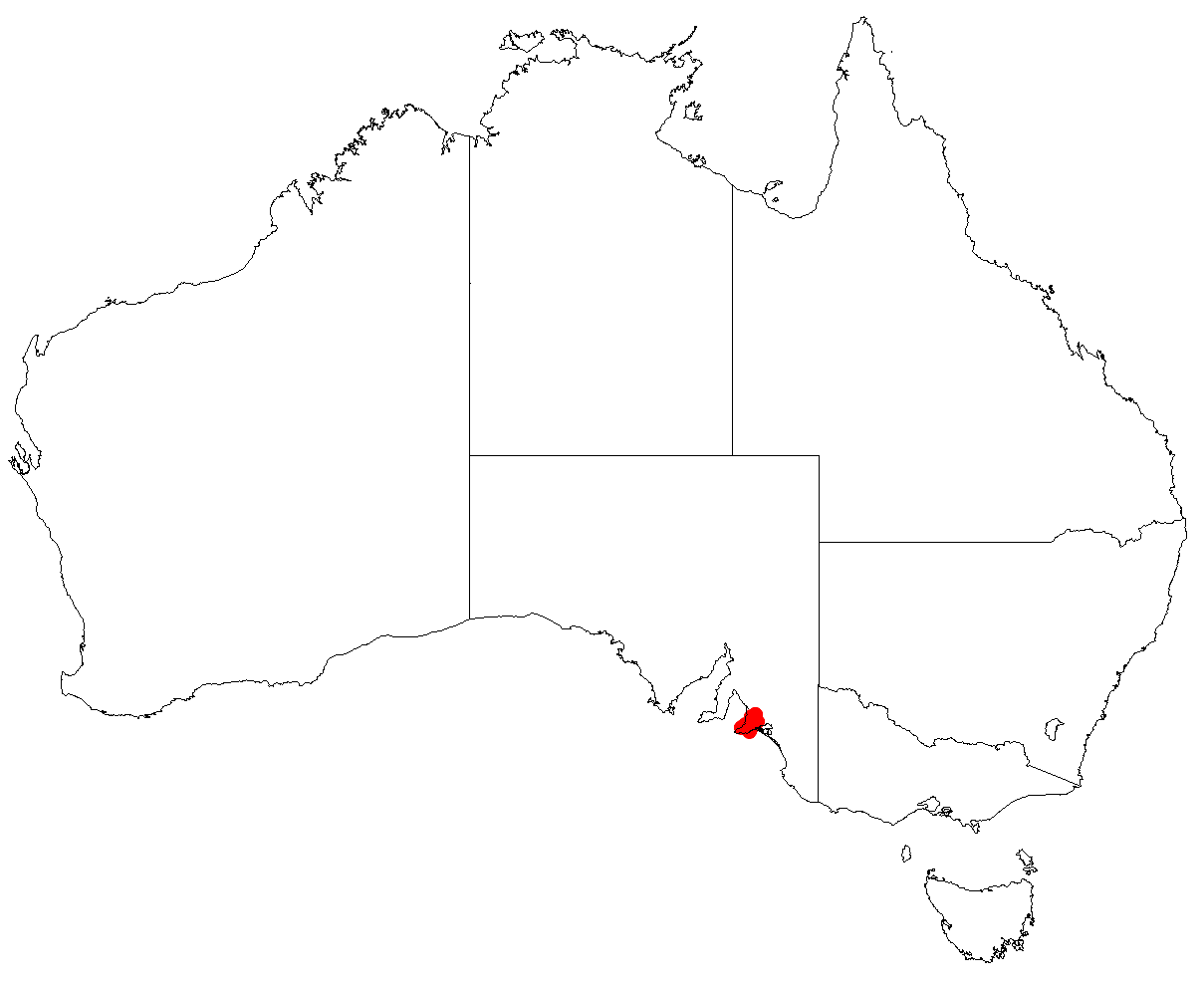
- Occurrence data from AVH

Synonyms
- Casuarina paludosa var. robusta Macklin

Species of plant

Allocasuarina robusta, commonly known as Mount Compass oak-bush, is a species of flowering plant in the family Casuarinaceae and is endemic to a restricted area of South Australia. It is a monoecious, rarely a dioecious shrub with erect branchlets up to 200 mm (7.9 in) long, the leaves reduced to scales in whorls of five to seven, the fruiting cones 12–20 mm (0.47–0.79 in) long containing winged seeds about 5.5–6.0 mm (0.22–0.24 in) long.

== Description ==
Allocasuarina robusta is a monoecious, rarely a dioecious shrub that typically grows to a height of 0.2–3 m (7.9 in – 9 ft 10.1 in) and has smooth bark. Its branchlets are more or less erect, up to 200 mm (7.9 in) long, the leaves reduced to scale-like teeth 0.6–1 mm (0.024–0.039 in) long, arranged in whorls of five to seven around the branchlets. The sections of branchlet between the leaf whorls are 7–14 mm (0.28–0.55 in) long and 0.7–1.1 mm (0.028–0.043 in) wide. Male flowers are arranged in spikes 5–45 mm (0.20–1.77 in) long, with 5 to 9 whorls per centimetre (per 0.39 in.), the anthers 0.8–1.2 mm (0.031–0.047 in) long. Female cones are sessile or on a peduncle up to 3 mm (0.12 in) long, the mature cones cylindrical, 12–20 mm (0.47–0.79 in) long and 7–12 mm (0.28–0.47 in) in diameter, the winged seeds black and 5.5–6.0 mm (0.22–0.24 in) long.

== Taxonomy ==
Mount Compass oak-bush was first formally described in 1927 by Ellen Dulcie Macklin who gave it the name Casuarina paludosa var. robusta in the Transactions and Proceedings of the Royal Society of South Australia. It was reclassified in 1982 as Allocasuarina pusilla by Lawrie Johnson in the Journal of the Adelaide Botanic Gardens. The specific epithet (robusta) means "hard" or "robust".

== Distribution and habitat ==
Allocasuarina robusta grows in heath and heathy woodland at higher elevations in an area of 184 km^{2} (71 sq mi) in the southern Mount Lofty Ranges, on the Fleurieu Peninsula to the south of Adelaide.

== Conservation status ==
Allocasuarina robusta is listed as "endangered" under the Australian Government Environment Protection and Biodiversity Conservation Act 1999. The main threats to the species include vegetation clearing, grazing pressure, road maintenance activities and weed invasion.
