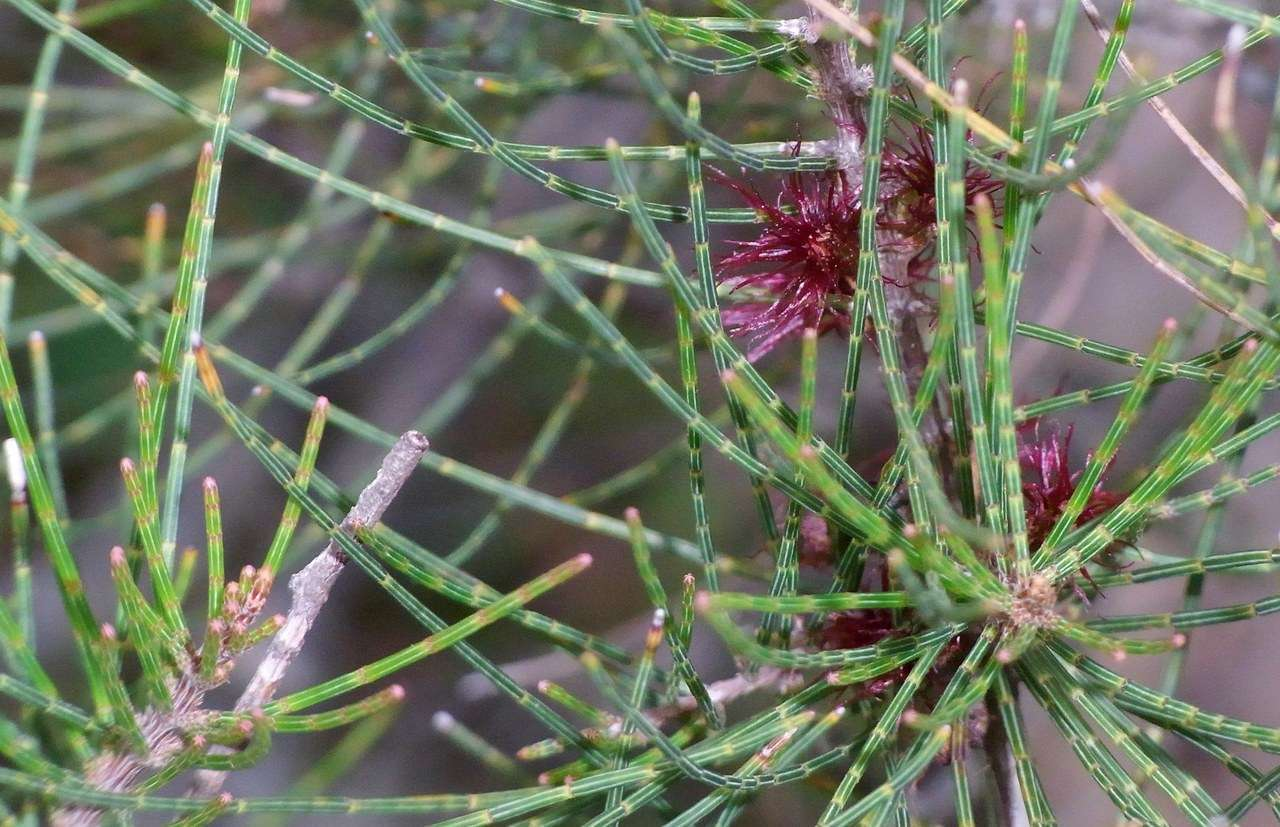
- Branchlets and immature female cones

Scientific classification
- Kingdom: Plantae
- Clade: Tracheophytes
- Clade: Angiosperms
- Clade: Eudicots
- Clade: Rosids
- Order: Fagales
- Family: Casuarinaceae
- Genus: Allocasuarina
- Species: A. misera

Binomial name
- Allocasuarina misera L.A.S.Johnson
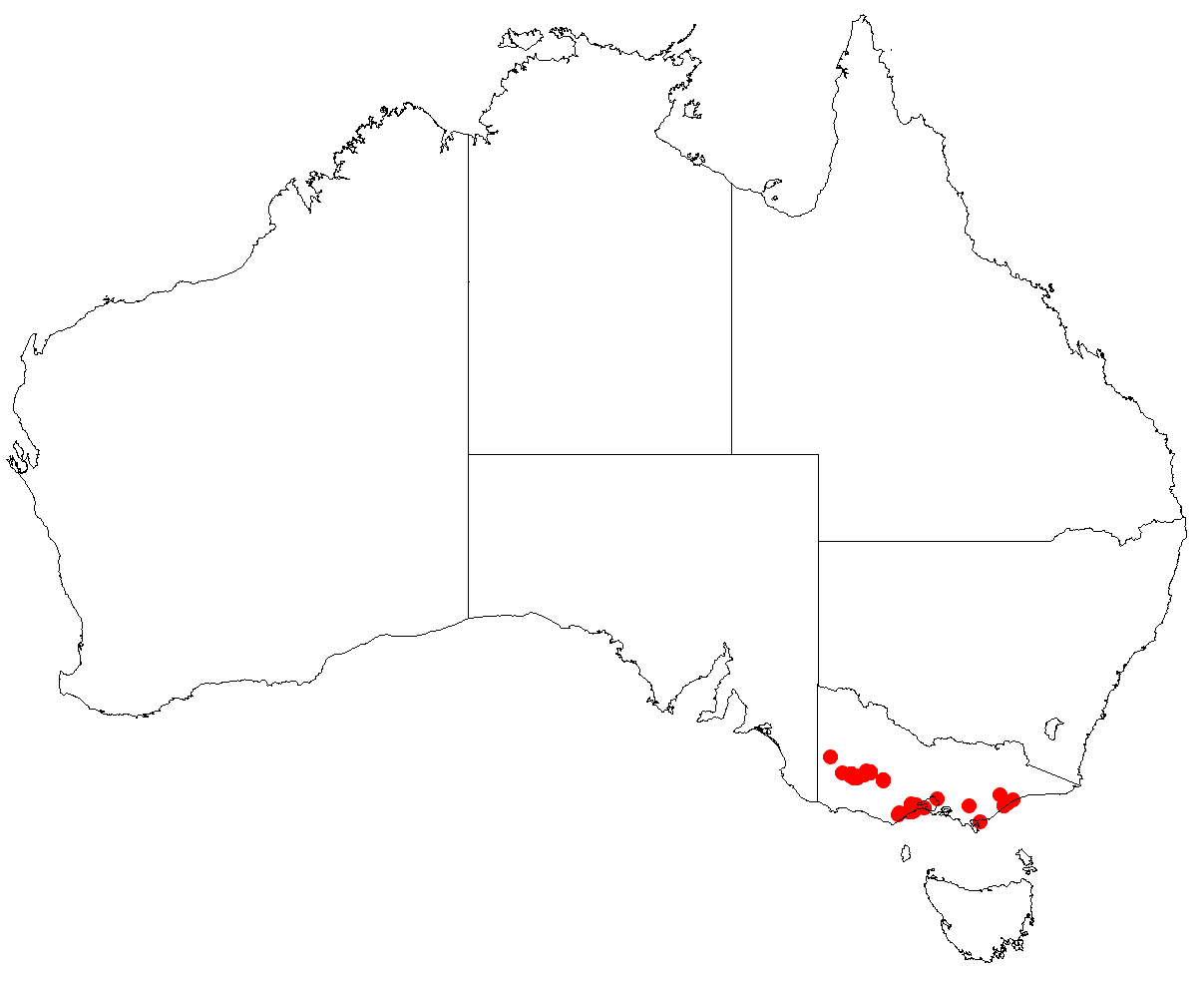
- Occurrence data from AVH

= Allocasuarina misera =

Species of flowering plant

Allocasuarina misera is a species of flowering plant in the family Casuarinaceae and is endemic to Victoria. It is a dioecious or monoecious shrub that has more or less erect branchlets up to 100 mm (3.9 in) long, the leaves reduced to scales in whorls of five to seven, the fruiting cones 9–16 mm (0.35–0.63 in) long containing winged seeds 4–6 mm (0.16–0.24 in) long.

== Description ==
Allocasuarina misera is a dioecious or monoecious shrub that typically grows to a height of 0.5–2 m (1 ft 8 in – 6 ft 7 in) and has smooth bark. Its branchlets are more or less erect, up to 100 mm (3.9 in) long, the leaves reduced to erect, scale-like teeth 0.3–0.8 mm (0.012–0.031 in) long, arranged in whorls of five to seven around the branchlets. The sections of branchlet between the leaf whorls are 4–10 mm (0.16–0.39 in) long, 0.3–0.8 mm (0.012–0.031 in) wide. Male flowers are arranged in spikes 5–15 mm (0.20–0.59 in) long, in whorls of six to twelve per centimetre (per 0.39 in.), the anthers 0.5–0.8 mm (0.020–0.031 in) long. Mature cones are cylindrical and sessile or on a peduncle up to 5 mm (0.20 in) long, 9–16 mm (0.35–0.63 in) long and 7–13 mm (0.28–0.51 in) in diameter, the winged seeds dark reddish-brown to black, and 4–6 mm (0.16–0.24 in) long.

== Taxonomy ==
Allocasuarina misera was first formally described in 1989 by Lawrie Johnson in the Flora of Australia from specimens collected near Anglesea in 1986. The specific epithet, (misera) means "wretched", referring to the appearance of this species compared to the related A. paradoxa.

== Distribution and habitat ==
This casuarina is found heath or open woodland in sandy soil, often near the coast in isolated and scattered populations across Victoria.

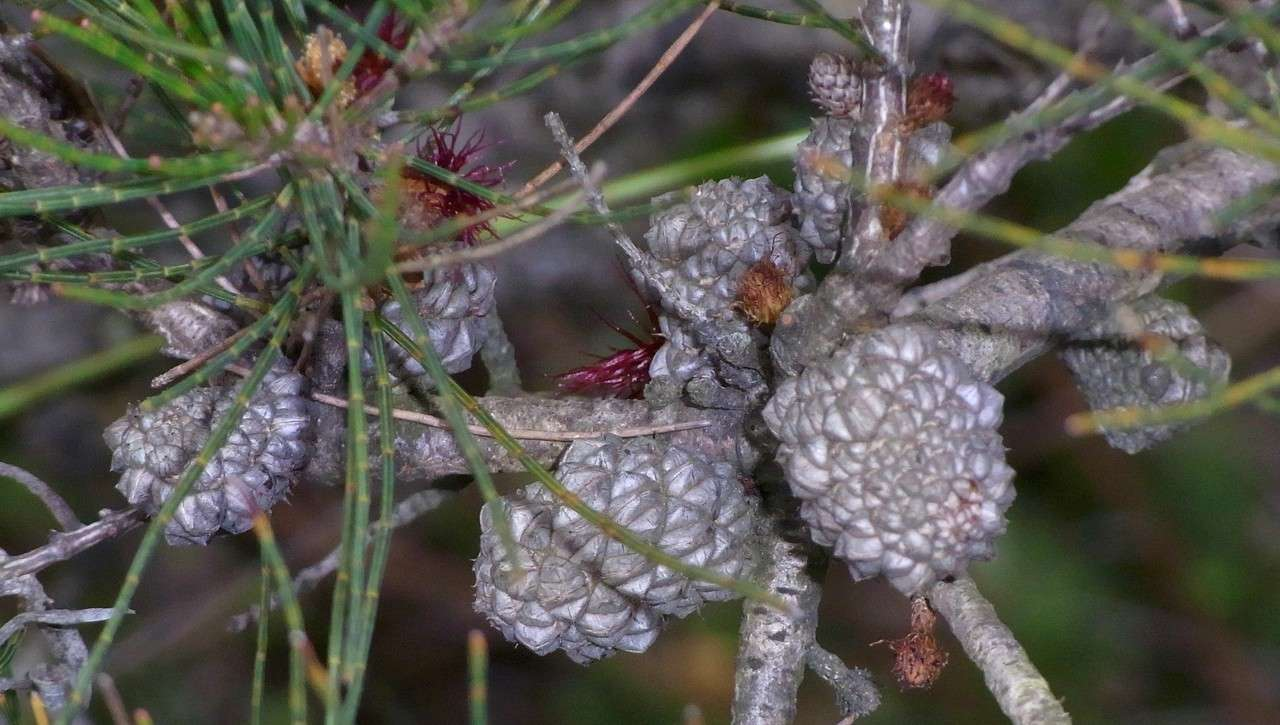
Mature cones

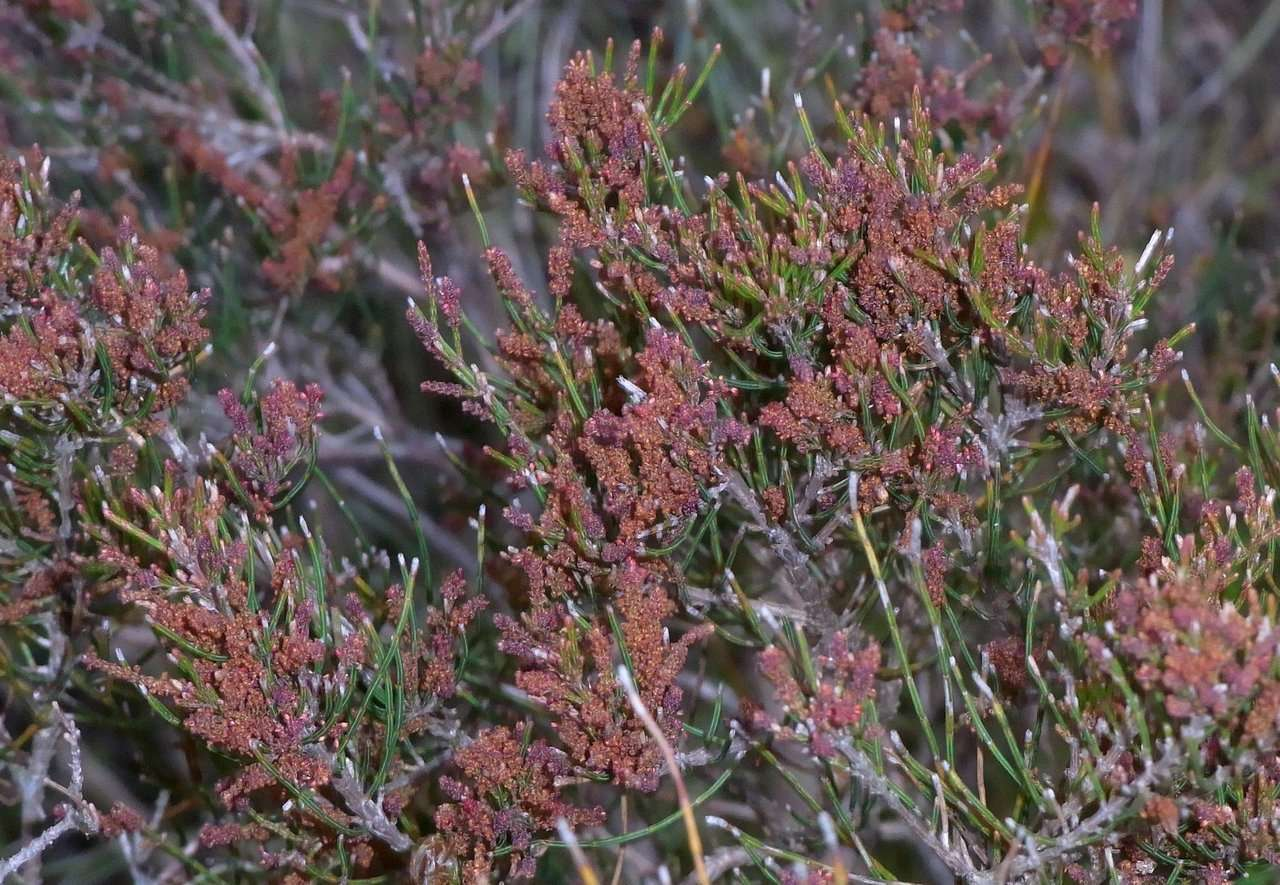
Male spikes
