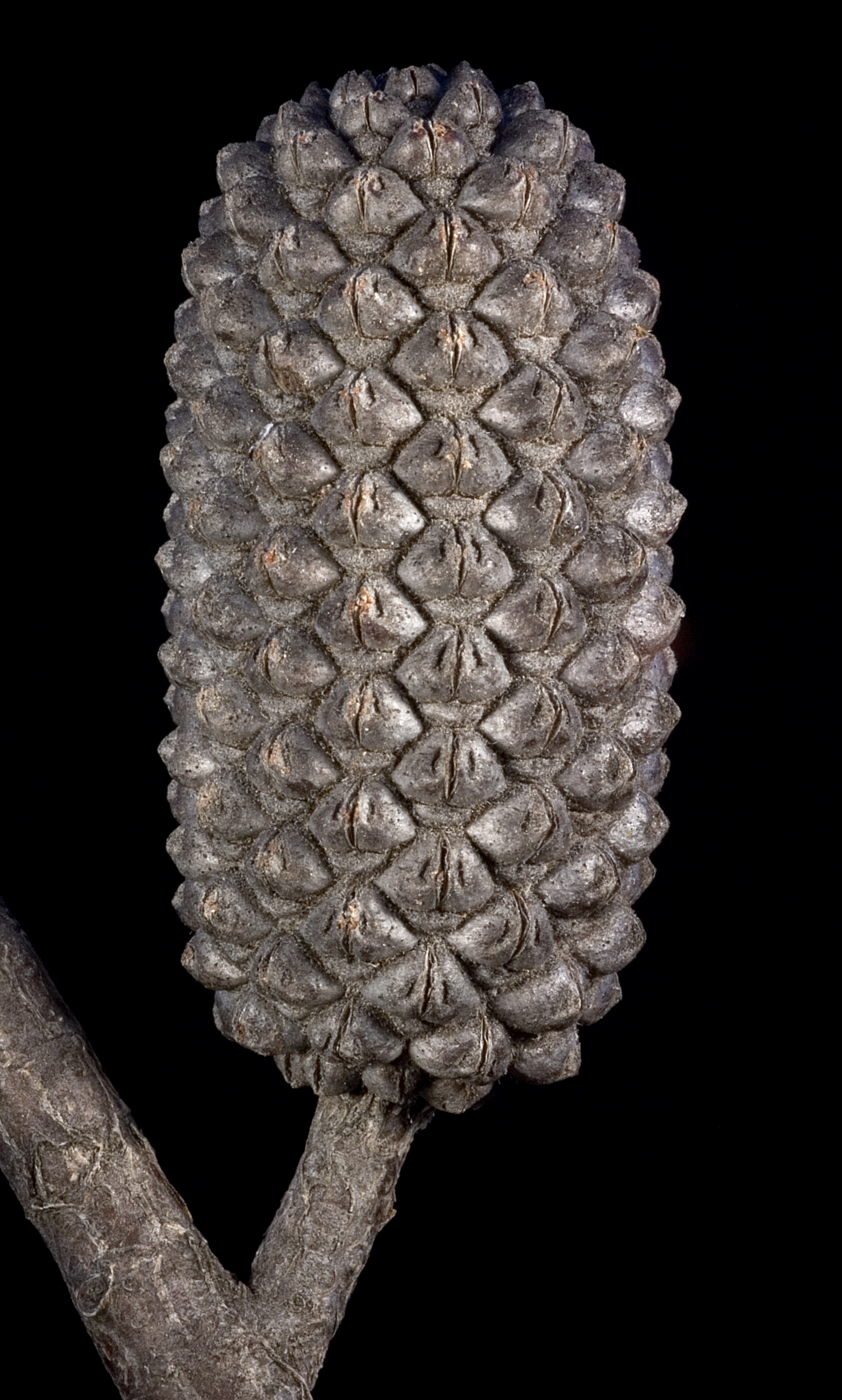
- Mature cone of A. eriochlamys subsp. grossa

Scientific classification
- Kingdom: Plantae
- Clade: Tracheophytes
- Clade: Angiosperms
- Clade: Eudicots
- Clade: Rosids
- Order: Fagales
- Family: Casuarinaceae
- Genus: Allocasuarina
- Species: A. eriochlamys

Binomial name
- Allocasuarina eriochlamys (L.A.S.Johnson) L.A.S.Johnson
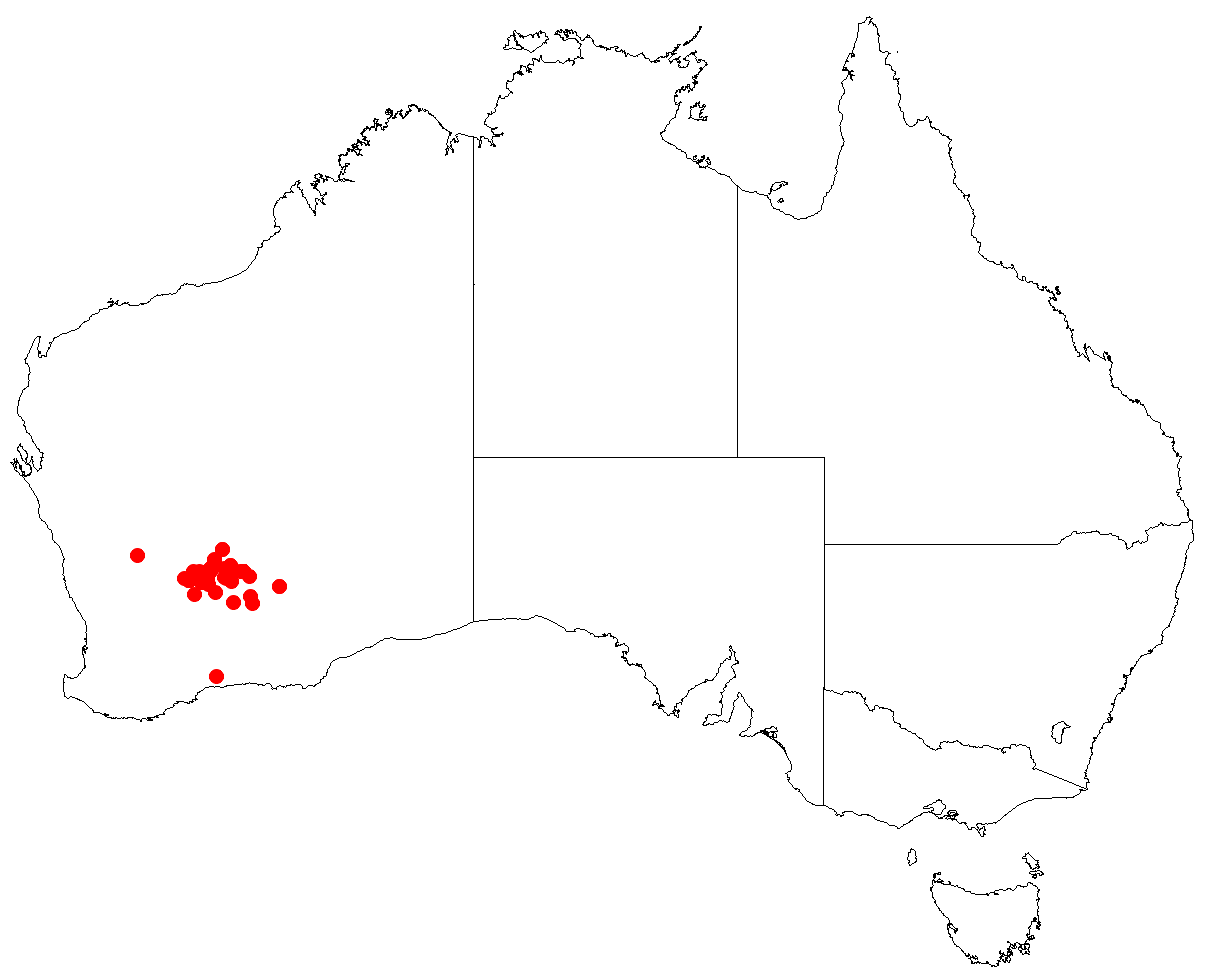
- Occurrence data from AVH

Synonyms
- Allocasuarina campestris subsp. eriochlamys (L.A.S.Johnson) L.A.S.Johnson; Casuarina campestris subsp. eriochlamys L.A.S.Johnson

= Allocasuarina eriochlamys =

Species of flowering plant

Allocasuarina eriochlamys is a species of flowering plant in the family Casuarinaceae and is endemic to inland areas of Western Australia. It is a dense, erect, monoecious or dioecious shrub that has more or less erect branchlets, its leaves reduced to scales in whorls of eight to ten, the mature fruiting cones 20–45 mm (0.79–1.77 in) long containing winged seeds (samaras) 5.0–10.5 mm (0.20–0.41 in) long.

== Description ==
Allocasuarina eriochlamys is a dense, erect, monoecious or dioecious shrub that typically grows to a height of 1–3 m (3 ft 3 in – 9 ft 10 in). Its branchlets are more or less erect, up to 230 mm (9.1 in) long, the leaves reduced to scale-like teeth usually 0.3–1 mm (0.012–0.039 in) long, arranged in whorls of eight to ten around the branchlets. The sections of branchlet between the leaf whorls (the "articles") are mostly 5–18 mm (0.20–0.71 in) long and 0.5–1.1 mm (0.020–0.043 in) wide. Male flowers are arranged in spikes 10–35 mm (0.39–1.38 in) long, in whorls of 7 to 11 per centimetre (per 0.39 in.), the anthers 0.6–0.8 mm (0.024–0.031 in) long. Female cones are cylindrical on a peduncle 4–15 mm (0.16–0.59 in) long, and mature cones are 20–45 mm (0.79–1.77 in) long and 13–21 mm (0.51–0.83 in) in diameter containing black samaras 5.0–10.5 mm (0.20–0.41 in) long.

== Taxonomy ==
This species was first formally described in 1972 by Lawrie Johnson who gave it the name Casuarina campestris subsp. eriochlamys in the journal Nuytsia from specimens collected by John Thomas Jutson near Comet Vale in 1917. In 1982 Johnson reclassified it as Allocasuarina campestris subsp. eriochlamys in the Journal of the Adelaide Botanic Gardens and in 1989 raised it to species status in the Flora of Australia. The specific epithet (eriochlamys) means a woolly cloak", referring to the fruiting cones.

In the same volume of Flora of Australia, Johnson described two subspecies of A. eriochlamys, and the names are accepted by the Australian Plant Census:

- Allocasuarina eriochlamys (L.A.S.Johnson) L.A.S.Johnson subsp. eriochlamys has articles 5–14 mm (0.20–0.55 in) long and 0.5–0.9 mm (0.020–0.035 in) wide, male spikes 10–34 mm (0.39–1.34 in) long, and mature cones 23–39 mm (0.91–1.54 in) long on a peduncle 4–13 mm (0.16–0.51 in) long.
- Allocasuarina eriochlamys subsp. grossa (L.A.S.Johnson) L.A.S.Johnson has articles 9–18 mm (0.35–0.71 in) long and 0.8–1.1 mm (0.031–0.043 in) wide, male spikes 16–35 mm (0.63–1.38 in) long, and mature cones 20–38 mm (0.79–1.50 in) long on a peduncle 4–15 mm (0.16–0.59 in) long.

== Distribution and habitat ==
Subspecies eriochlamys grows in mallee woodland on stony slopes between Comet Vale and Kalgoorlie in the Coolgardie and Murchison bioregions and subsp. grossa grows around granite outcrops, mainly near Norseman in the Coolgardie and Nullarbor bioregions of Western Australia.

== Conservation status ==
Subspecies eriochlamys is listed as "not threatened" by the Department of Biodiversity, Conservation and Attractions, but subsp. grossa is listed as "Priority Three", meaning that it is poorly known and known from only a few locations but is not under imminent threat.
