= Allocasuarina media =

Conservation status
- Vulnerable (EPBC Act)

Scientific classification
- Kingdom: Plantae
- Clade: Tracheophytes
- Clade: Angiosperms
- Clade: Eudicots
- Clade: Rosids
- Order: Fagales
- Family: Casuarinaceae
- Genus: Allocasuarina
- Species: A. media

Binomial name
- Allocasuarina media L.A.S.Johnson
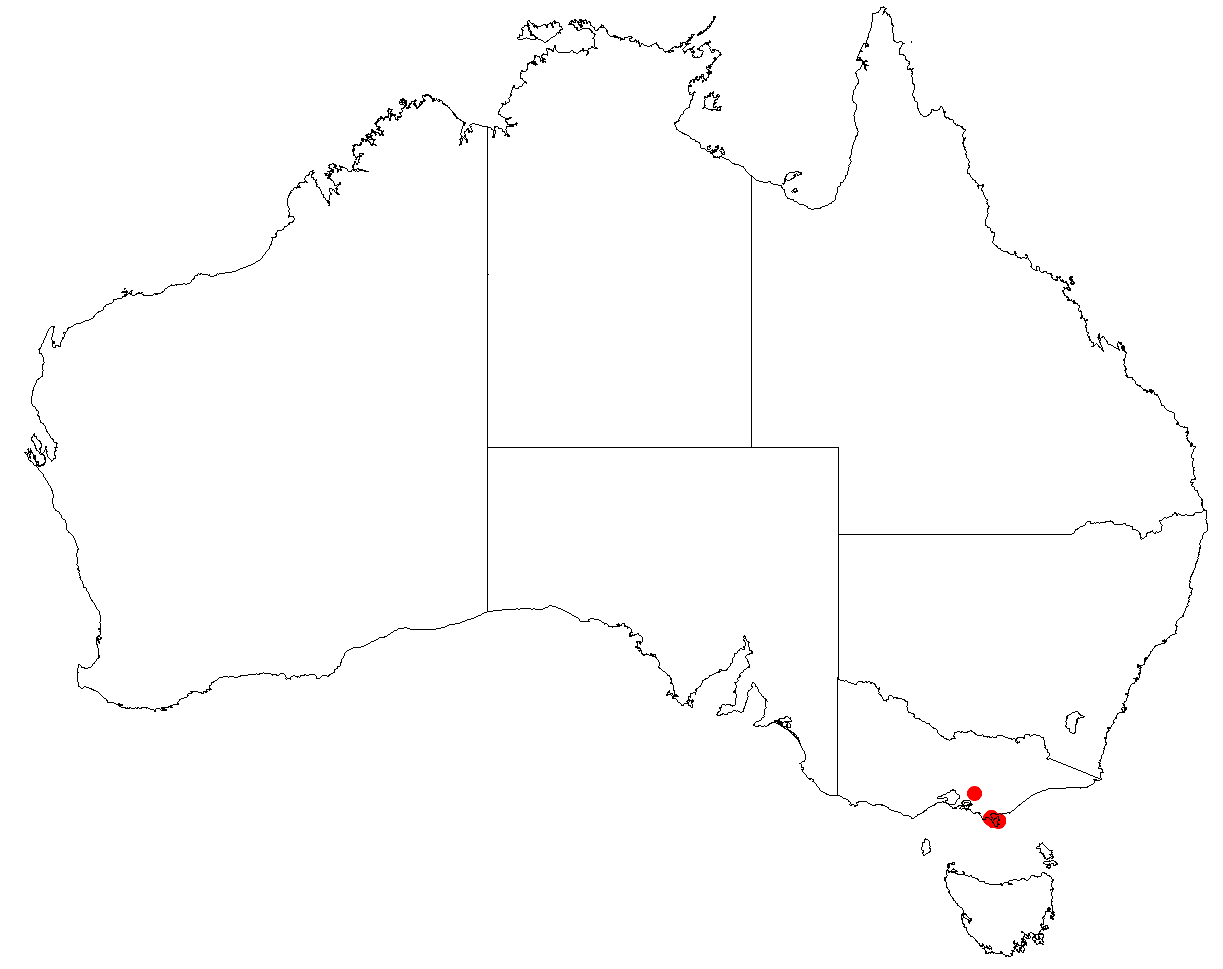
- Occurrence data from AVH

Species of flowering plant

Allocasuarina media is a species of flowering plant in the family Casuarinaceae and is endemic to a small area of Victoria. It is a dioecious, rarely a monoecious shrub that has more or less erect branchlets up to 200 mm (7.9 in) long, the leaves reduced to scales in whorls of six to eight, the fruiting cones usually 14–27 mm (0.55–1.06 in) long containing winged seeds (samaras) 5–8 mm (0.20–0.31 in) long.

== Description ==
Allocasuarina media is a dioecious, or rarely a monoecious shrub that typically grows to a height of 1–3 m (3 ft 3 in – 9 ft 10 in) and has smooth bark. Its branchlets are more or less erect, up to 200 mm (7.9 in) long, the leaves reduced to erect or slightly spreading, scale-like teeth about 0.5 mm (0.020 in) long, arranged in whorls of six to eight around the branchlets. The sections of branchlet between the leaf whorls (the "articles") are 5–12 mm (0.20–0.47 in) long, 0.5–0.8 mm (0.020–0.031 in) wide. Male flowers are spikes 10–45 mm (0.39–1.77 in) long, often appearing like a string of beads, the anthers 0.5–1 mm (0.020–0.039 in) long. Female cones are cylindrical and sessile or on a peduncle up to 15 mm (0.59 in) long. Mature cones are cylindrical, mostly 14–27 mm (0.55–1.06 in) long and 8–15 mm (0.31–0.59 in) in diameter, the samaras dark reddish-brown to black, and 5–8 mm (0.20–0.31 in) long.

This species is thought to be a well-established hybrid of A. littoralis and A. paradoxa.

== Taxonomy ==
Allocasuarina media was first formally described in 1989 by Lawrie Johnson in the Flora of Australia from specimens collected in Wilsons Promontory National Park in 1986. The specific epithet, (media) means "middling" referring to its intermediate position between A. littoralis and A. paradoxa.

== Distribution and habitat ==
This she-oak is only known from low woodland on the northern end of Wilsons Promontory and a single collection from near Gembrook.
