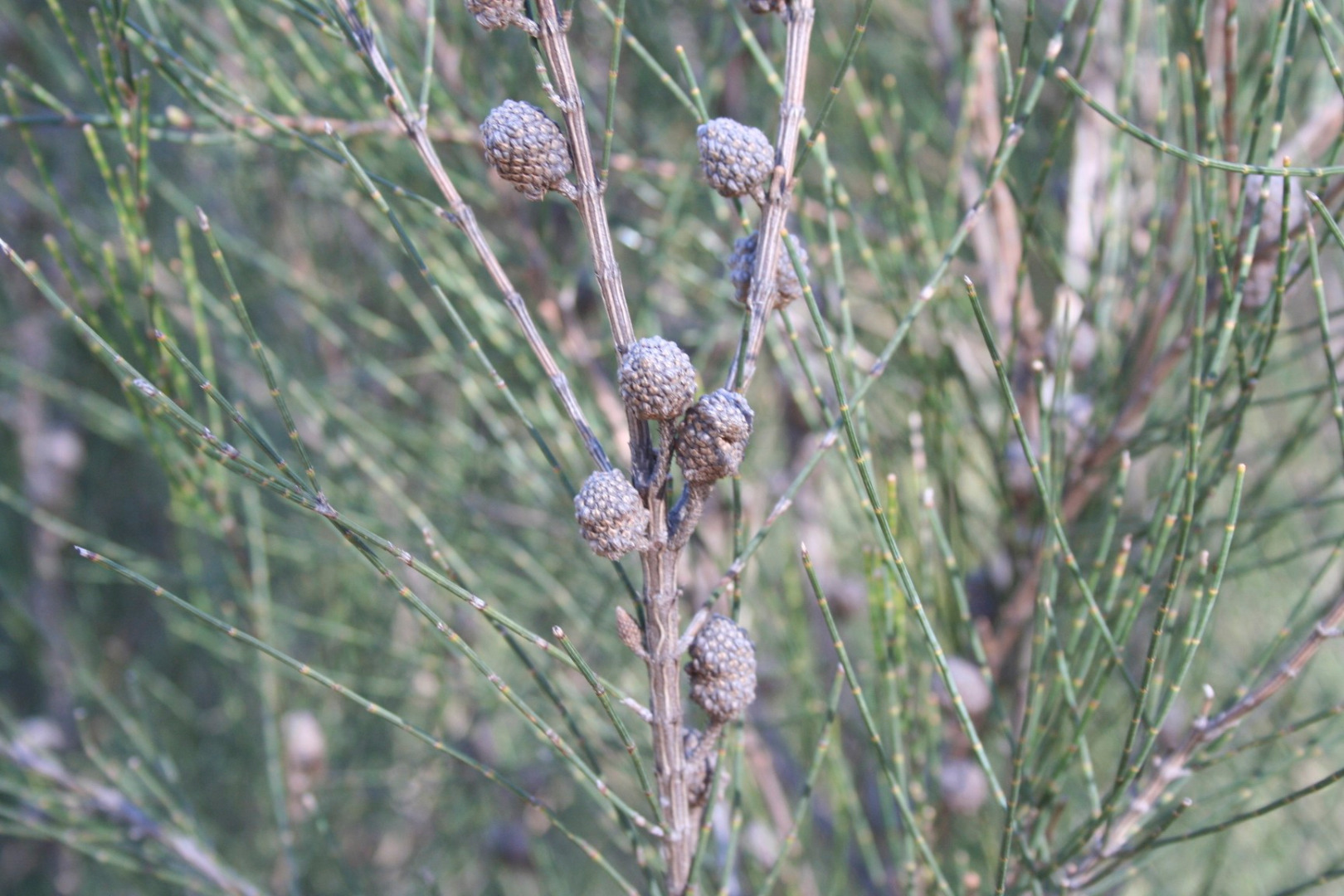
- In Girraween National Park

Scientific classification
- Kingdom: Plantae
- Clade: Tracheophytes
- Clade: Angiosperms
- Clade: Eudicots
- Clade: Rosids
- Order: Fagales
- Family: Casuarinaceae
- Genus: Allocasuarina
- Species: A. rupicola

Binomial name
- Allocasuarina rupicola L.A.S.Johnson
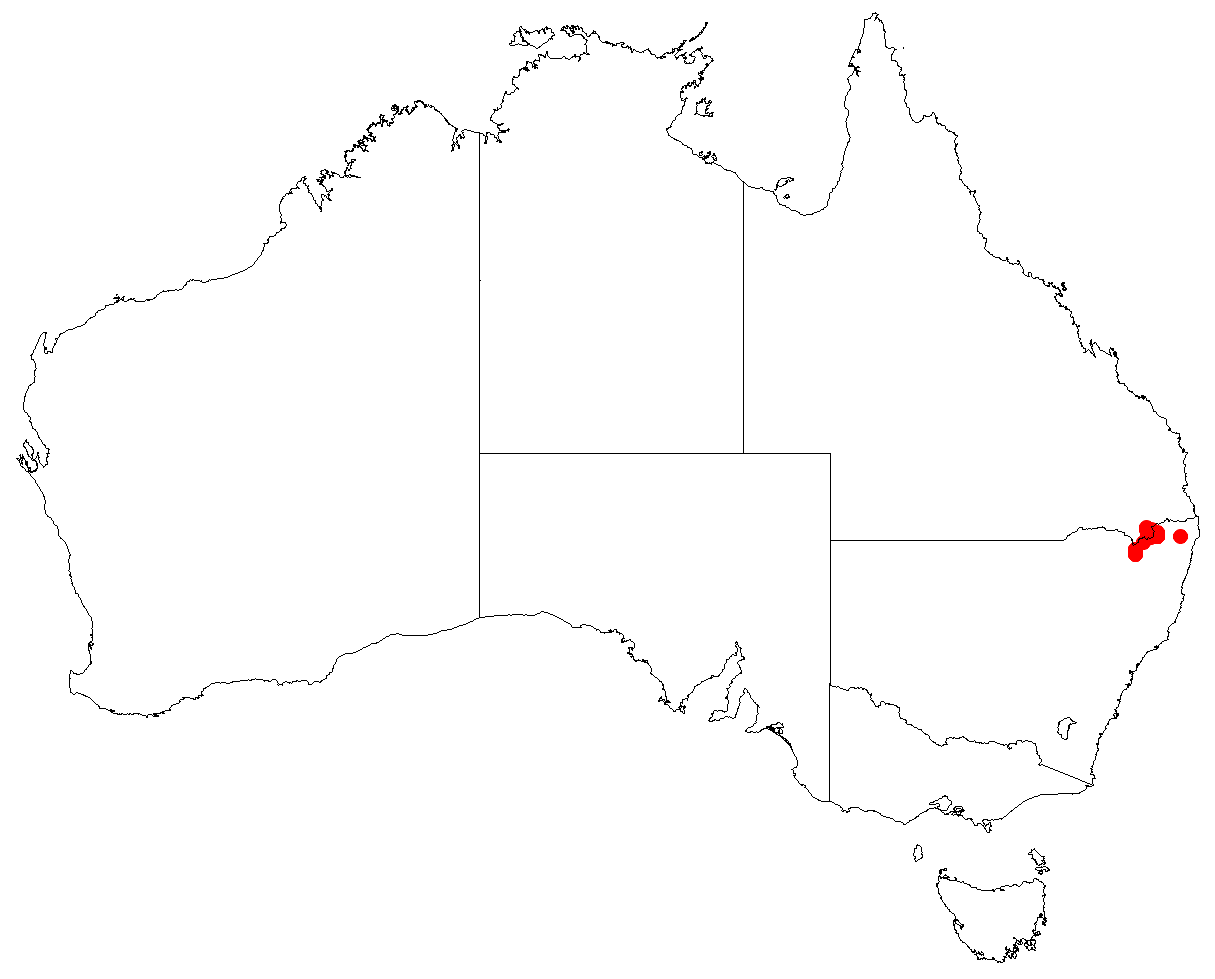
- Occurrence data from AVH

= Allocasuarina rupicola =

Species of flowering plant

Allocasuarina rupicola, commonly known as shrubby she-oak, is a species of flowering plant in the family Casuarinaceae and is endemic to a restricted area of eastern Australia. It is a slender, dioecious shrub that has branchlets up to 180 mm (7.1 in) long, the leaves reduced to scales in whorls of seven or eight, the fruiting cones 6–19 mm (0.24–0.75 in) long containing winged seeds 2.8–5.0 mm (0.11–0.20 in) long.

== Description ==
Allocasuarina rupicola is a slender, dioecious shrub that typically grows to a height of 1–3 m (3 ft 3 in – 9 ft 10 in) and has smooth bark. Its branchlets are up to 180 mm (7.1 in) long, the leaves reduced to scale-like teeth 0.2–0.6 mm (0.0079–0.0236 in) long, arranged in whorls of seven or eight around the branchlets. The sections of branchlet between the leaf whorls are 8–11 mm (0.31–0.43 in) long, 0.7–0.9 mm (0.028–0.035 in) wide. Male flowers are arranged in spikes resembling a string of beads 10–25 mm (0.39–0.98 in) long, with 7.5 to 8 whorls per centimetre (per 0.39 in.), the anthers 0.7–0.8 mm (0.028–0.031 in) long. Female cones are on a peduncle 2–14 mm (0.079–0.551 in) long, and mature cones shortly cylindrical, 6–19 mm (0.24–0.75 in) long and 6–10 mm (0.24–0.39 in) in diameter, containing winged seeds 2.8–5.0 mm (0.11–0.20 in) long.

== Taxonomy ==
Allocasuarina rupicola was first described in 1989 by Lawrie Johnson in Flora of Australia. The specific epithet, (rupicola) means "rock-dweller", referring to its occurrence near rocks.

== Distribution and habitat ==
Shrubby she-oak is found among clefts in granite on the slopes of mountains and near creeks between Wyberba in south-eastern Queensland, and Boonoo Boonoo National Park in north eastern New South Wales.
