= Allocasuarina globosa =

Scientific classification
- Kingdom: Plantae
- Clade: Tracheophytes
- Clade: Angiosperms
- Clade: Eudicots
- Clade: Rosids
- Order: Fagales
- Family: Casuarinaceae
- Genus: Allocasuarina
- Species: A. globosa

Binomial name
- Allocasuarina globosa L.A.S.Johnson

Species of flowering plant

Allocasuarina globosa is a species of flowering plant in the family Casuarinaceae and is endemic to a restricted part of inland Western Australia. It is a dioecious shrub that has more or less erect branchlets, its leaves reduced to scales in whorls of ten to twelve, the mature fruiting cones more or less spherical and 15–17 mm (0.59–0.67 in) long, containing winged seeds (samaras) 6.0–6.5 mm (0.24–0.26 in) long.

== Description ==
Allocasuarina eriochlamys is a dioecious shrub that typically grows to a height of 1.5 m (4 ft 11 in). Its branchlets are more or less erect, up to 120 mm (4.7 in) long, the leaves reduced to scale-like teeth 0.6–1 mm (0.024–0.039 in) long, arranged in whorls of ten to twelve around the branchlets. The sections of branchlet between the leaf whorls (the "articles") are mostly 17–28 mm (0.67–1.10 in) long and 0.9–1.2 mm (0.035–0.047 in) wide. Mature cones are more or less spherical, 15–17 mm (0.59–0.67 in) long and 13–15 mm (0.51–0.59 in) in diameter, containing brown samaras 6.0–6.5 mm (0.24–0.26 in) long.

== Taxonomy ==
Allocasuarina globosa was first formally described in 1989 in the Flora of Australia from specimens collected by John Stanley Beard in the Bremer Range in 1964. The specific epithet (globosus) means a "spherical", referring to the fruiting cones.

== Distribution and habitat ==
This sheoak is only known from Mount Day at the end of the Bremer Range, west of Norseman where it grows in dense scrubland with A. campestris at the bottom of a steep slope, in the Coolgardie bioregion of inland Western Australia.

== Conservation status ==
Allocasuarina globosa is listed as "Threatened" by the Western Australian Government Department of Biodiversity, Conservation and Attractions, meaning that it is in danger of extinction.
