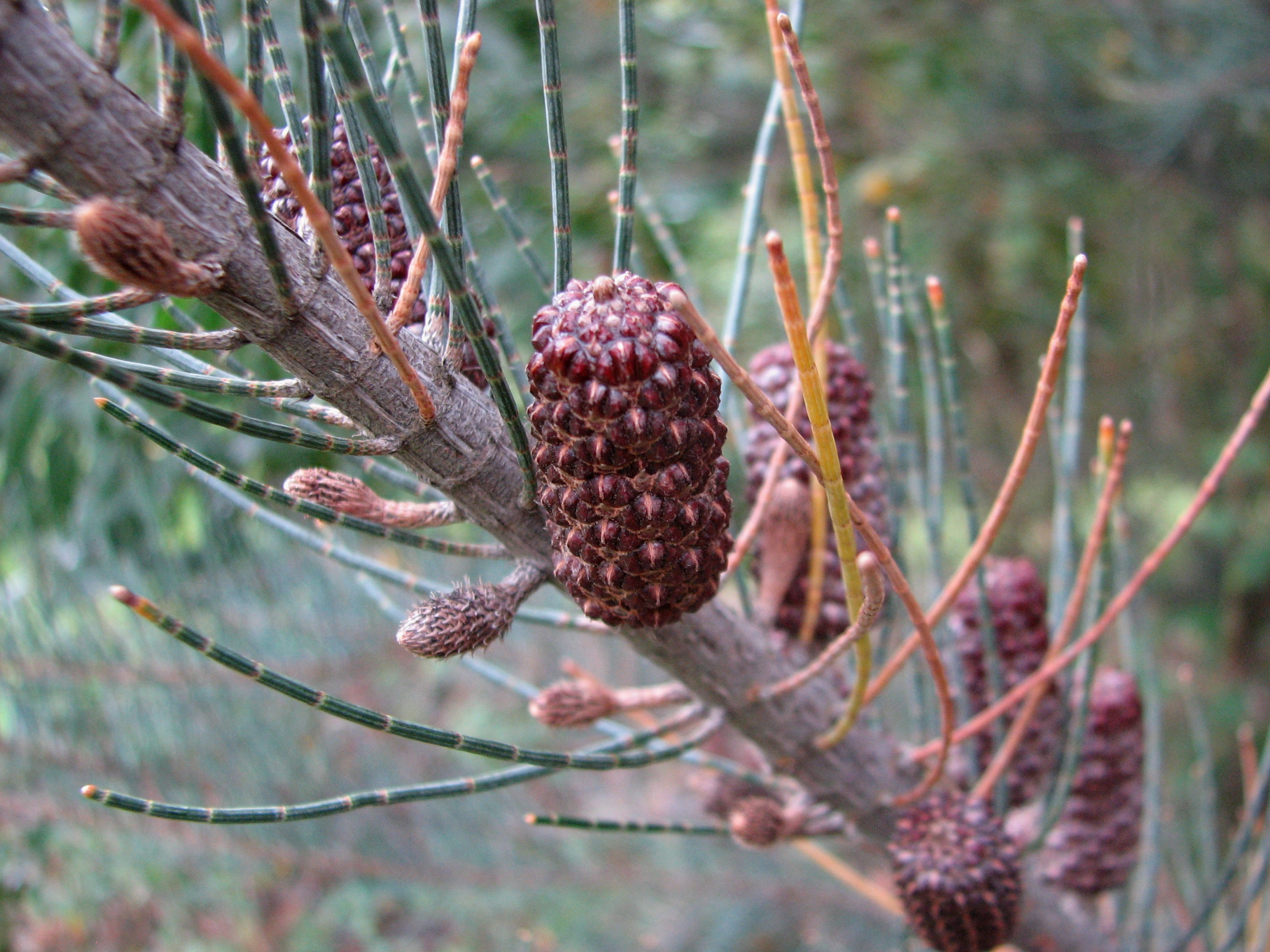
- Branchlets and female cones

Conservation status
- Vulnerable (IUCN 3.1)

Scientific classification
- Kingdom: Plantae
- Clade: Tracheophytes
- Clade: Angiosperms
- Clade: Eudicots
- Clade: Rosids
- Order: Fagales
- Family: Casuarinaceae
- Genus: Allocasuarina
- Species: A. grampiana

Binomial name
- Allocasuarina grampiana L.A.S.Johnson
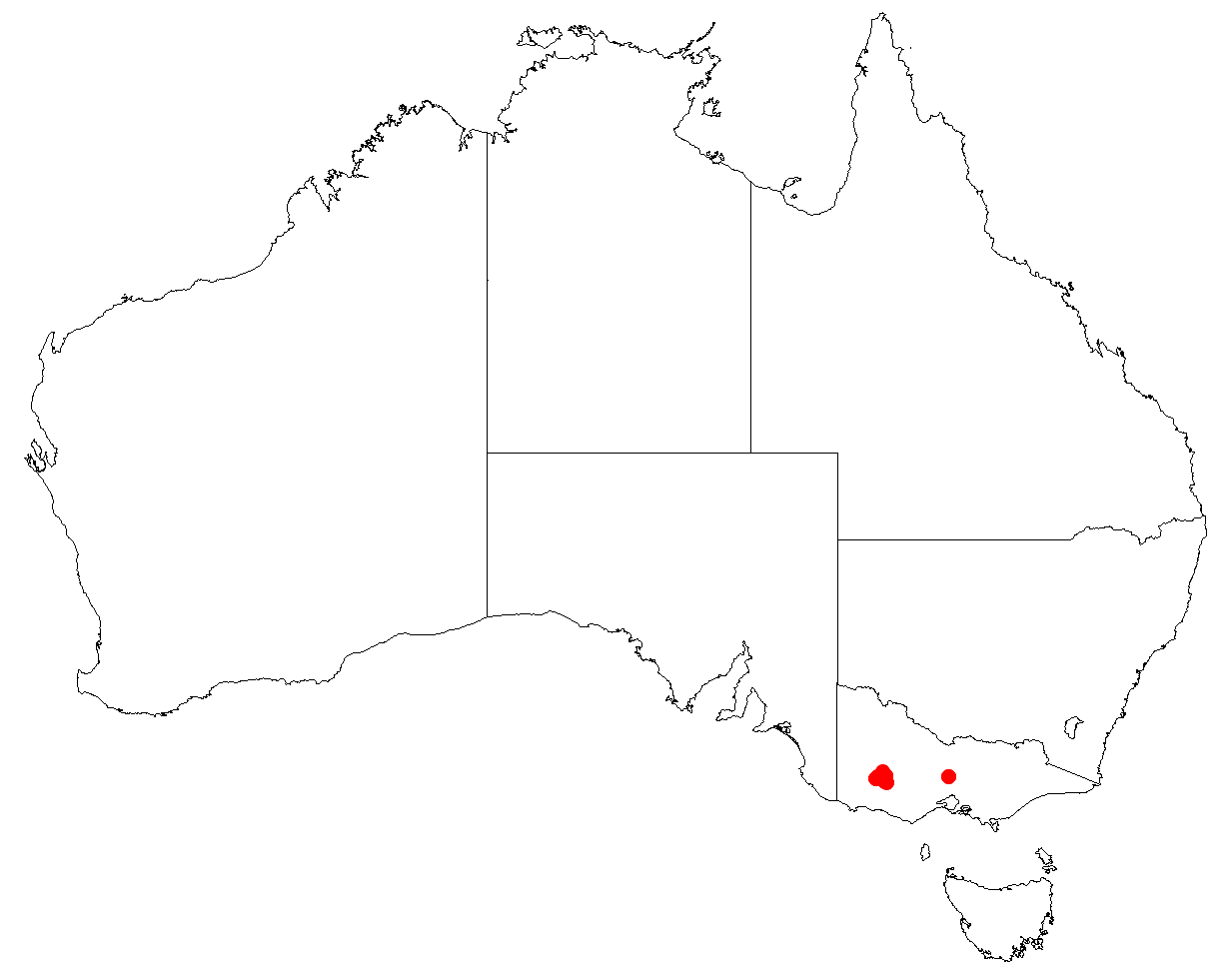
- Occurrence data from AVH

= Allocasuarina grampiana =

Species of flowering plant

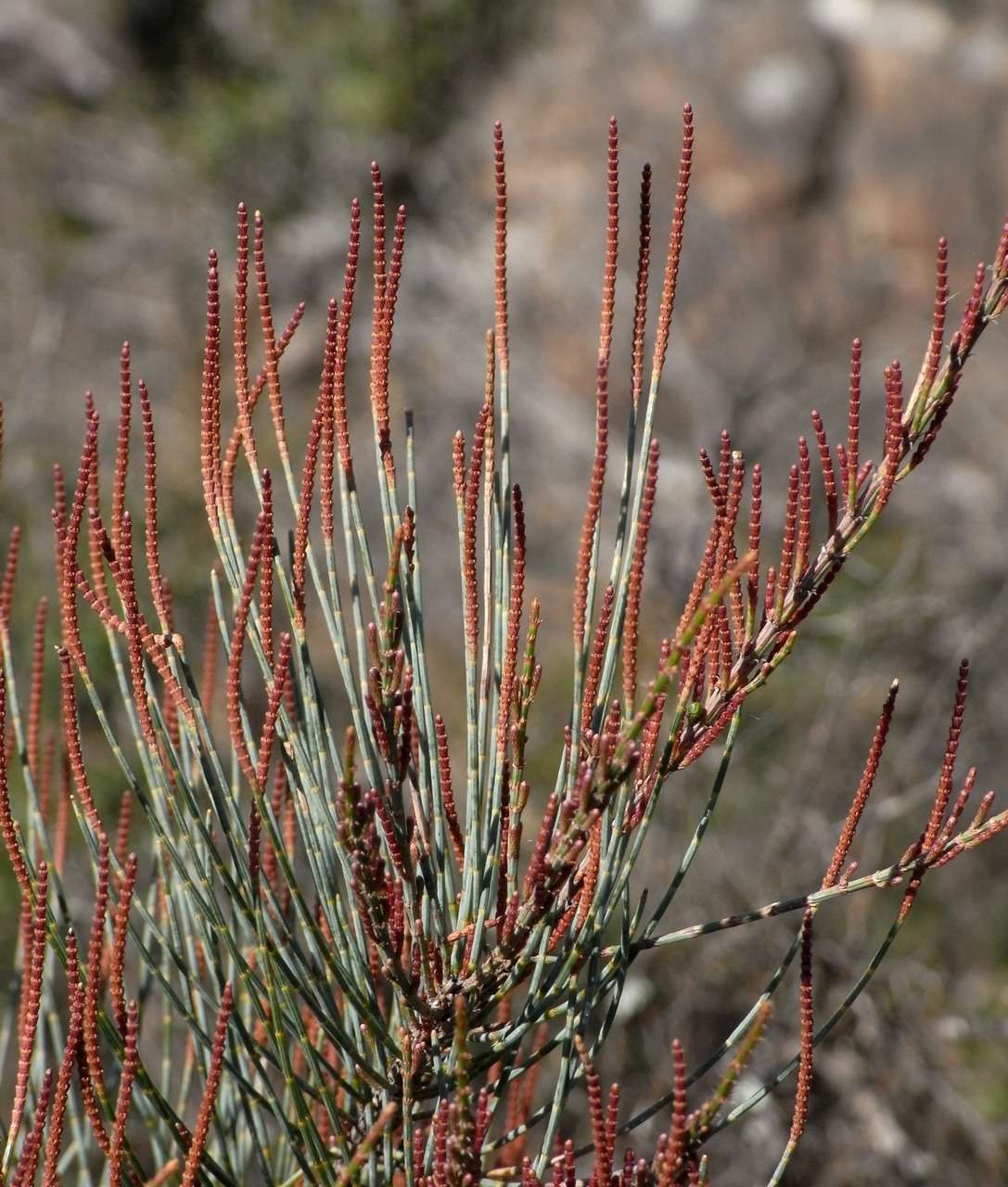
Male spikes

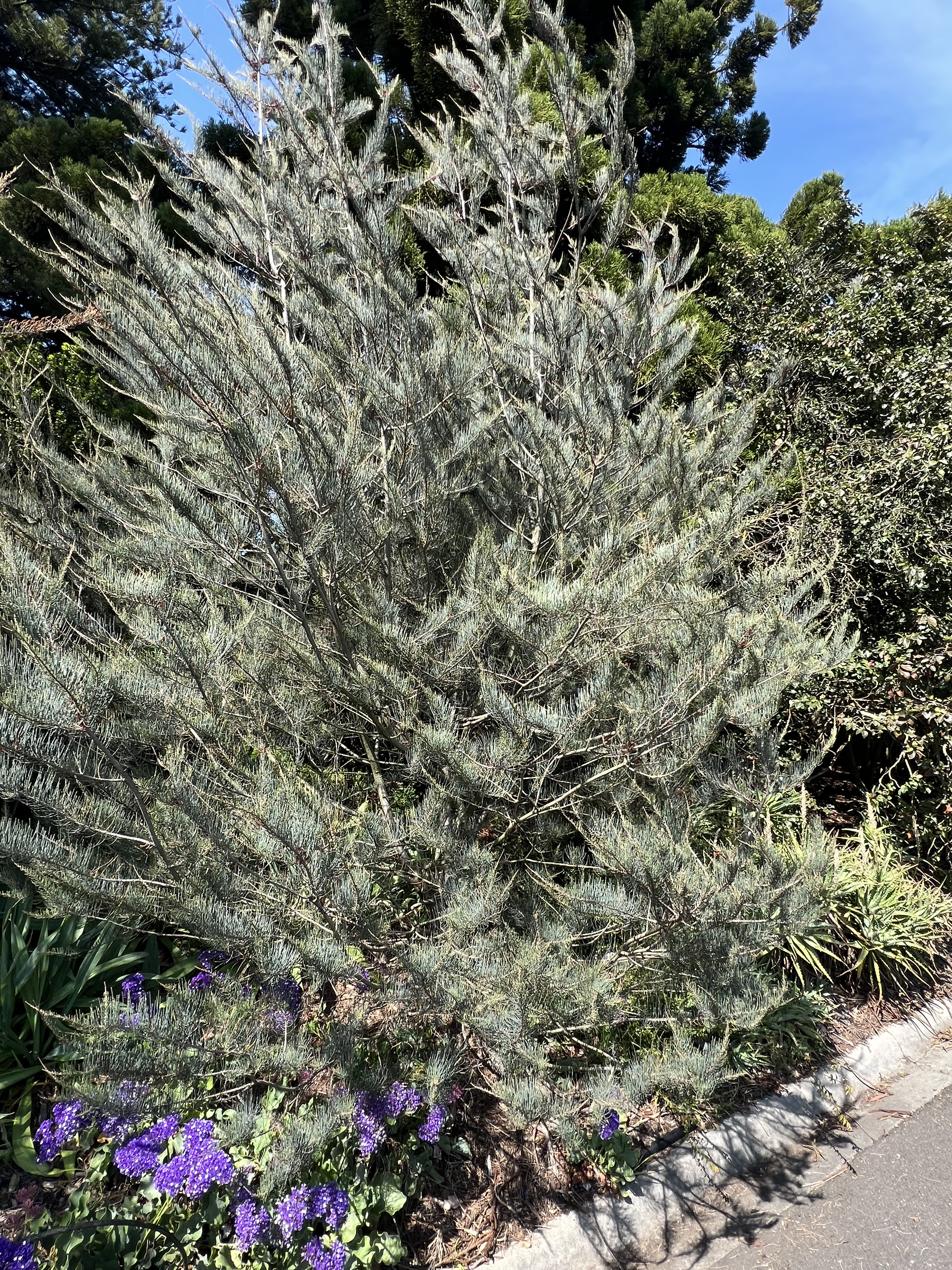
Habit growing in the RBGV

Allocasuarina grampiana, commonly known as Grampians sheoak, is a species of flowering plant in the family Casuarinaceae and is endemic to the Grampians National Park in Victoria. It is a dioecious shrub that has branchlets up to 150 mm (5.9 in) long, the leaves reduced to scales in whorls of six or seven, the fruiting cones 13–35 mm (0.51–1.38 in) long containing winged seeds (samaras) about 5 mm (0.20 in) long.

== Description ==
Allocasuarina grampiana is a dioecious shrub that typically grows to a height of 1–4 m (3 ft 3 in – 13 ft 1 in) and has smooth bark. Its branchlets are more or less erect, up to 150 mm (5.9 in) long, the leaves reduced to erect to slightly spreading, scale-like teeth 0.4–0.8 mm (0.016–0.031 in) long, arranged in whorls of six or seven around the branchlets. The sections of branchlet between the leaf whorls (the "articles") are 5–12 mm (0.20–0.47 in) long, 0.7–1 mm (0.028–0.039 in) wide and have a waxy covering. Male flowers are arranged in spikes 10–40 mm (0.39–1.57 in) long, the anthers 0.7–0.8 mm (0.028–0.031 in) long. Female cones are cylindrical, on a peduncle 2–6 mm (0.079–0.236 in) long. Mature cones are 13–35 mm (0.51–1.38 in) long and 7–9 mm (0.28–0.35 in) in diameter, the samaras 4.5–5.5 mm (0.18–0.22 in) long.

== Taxonomy ==
Allocasuarina grampiana was first formally described in 1989 by Lawrie Johnson in the Flora of Australia from specimens collected by David Eric Symon on the upper slopes of Mount Rosea in 1965. The specific epithet, (grampiana) refers to the Grampians National Park, to where this species is restricted.

== Distribution and habitat ==
Grampians sheoak is restricted to the Grampians National Park, where it grows on sandstone outcrops.

== Conservation status ==
Allocasuarina grampiana is listed as "endangered" under the Victorian Government Flora and Fauna Guarantee Act 1988.
