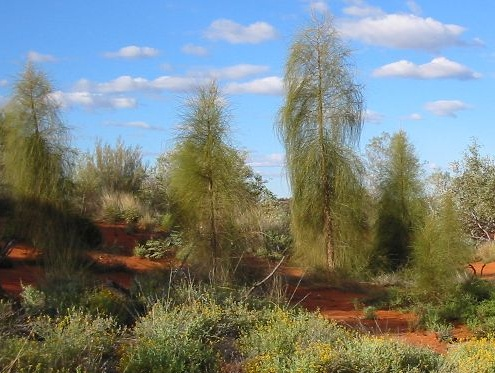
- Allocasuarina decaisneana in Central Australia

Scientific classification
- Kingdom: Plantae
- Clade: Tracheophytes
- Clade: Angiosperms
- Clade: Eudicots
- Clade: Rosids
- Order: Fagales
- Family: Casuarinaceae
- Genus: Allocasuarina; L.A.S.Johnson

Type species
- Allocasuarina torulosa (Aiton) L.A.S.Johnson

Species
- 61 species; see text.

= Allocasuarina =

Genus of flowering plants

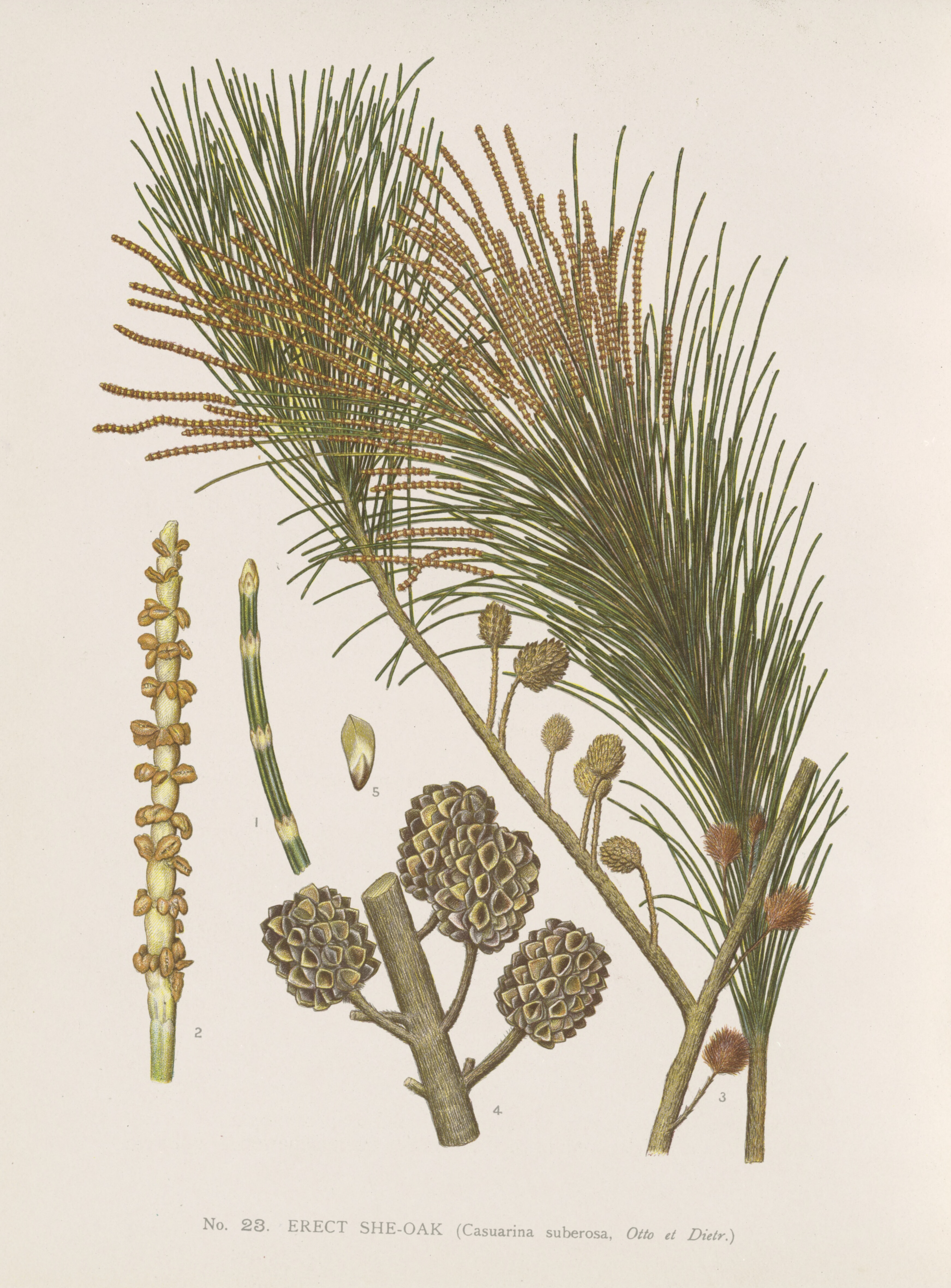
Allocasuarina littoralis drawing (Edward Minchen)

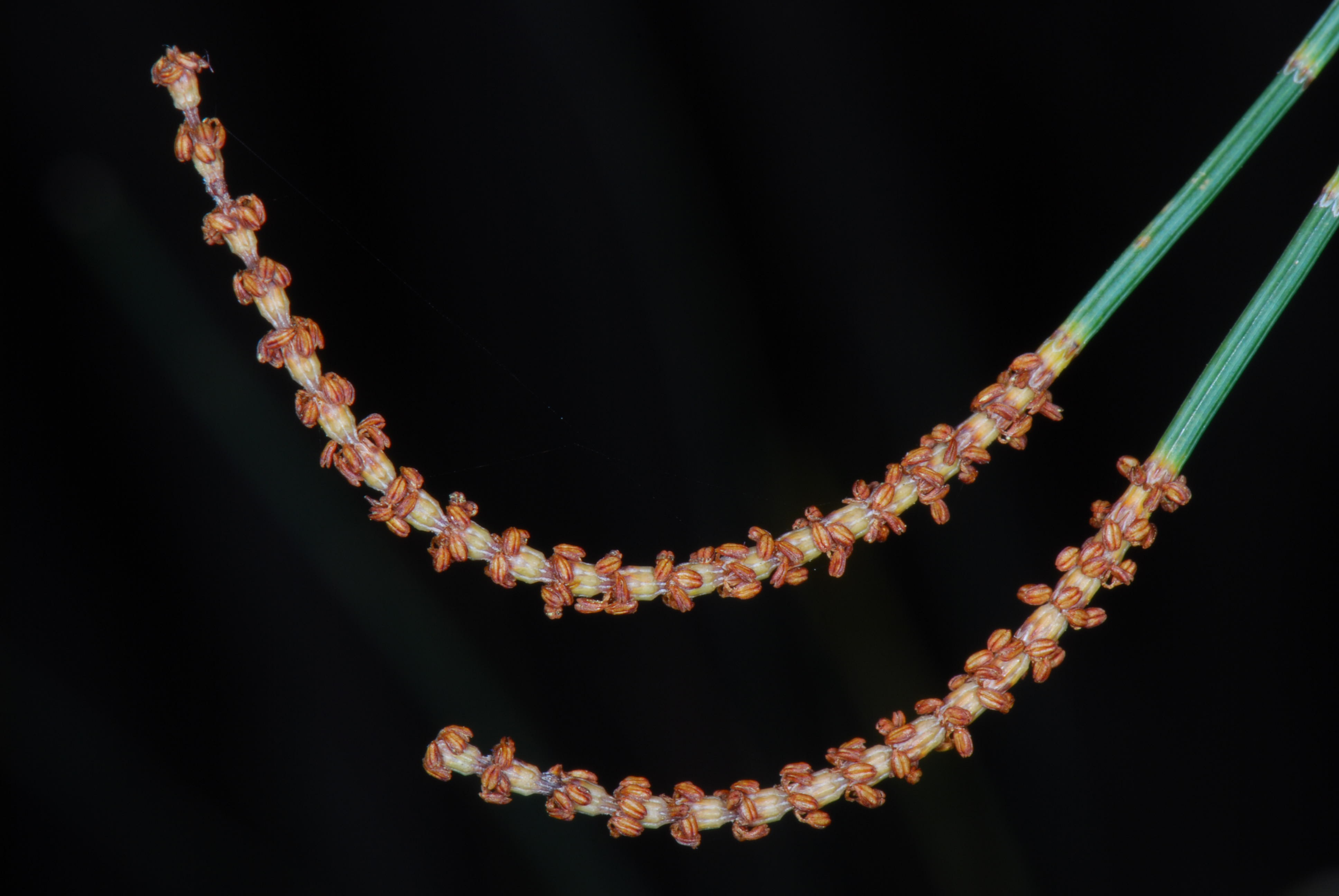
Allocasuarina inophloia

Allocasuarina, commonly known as sheoak or she-oak, is a genus of flowering plants in the family Casuarinaceae and is endemic to Australia. Plants in the genus Allocasuarina are trees or shrubs with soft, pendulous, green branchlets, the leaves reduced to scale-like teeth. Allocasuarinas are either monoecious or dioecious, the flowers never bisexual. Male and female flowers are arranged in spikes, the female spikes developing into cone-like structures enclosing winged seeds.

The genera Allocasuarina and Casuarina are similar, and many formerly in the latter now included in Allocasuarina.

== Description ==
Plants in the genus Allocasuarina are trees or shrubs with soft, pendulous, green branchlets, the leaves reduced to 4 to 14 scale-like teeth arranged around in whorls around ribbed, jointed branchlets. Allocasuarinas have separate male and female flowers, sometimes on one plant (monoecious), otherwise on separate male and female plants, (dioecious). Male flowers are arranged in spikes along branchlets that are usually different from the vegetative branchlets. Female flowers are in spikes on short side-branches, the female spikes later developing into cone-like structures enclosing winged seeds known as samaras, which are reddish-brown to black, with thickly woody bracteoles that extend only slightly beyond the cone body.

The genera Allocasuarina was created out of a grouping of plants formerly placed in Casuarina, because of subtle but consistent differences – Casuarina species have 6 to 20 scale-like teeth in each whorl of leaves, their samaras are grey or yellowish-brown, and the bracteoles of the fruiting cones are thin, woody and extend well beyond the cone body.

== Taxonomy ==
The genus Allocasuarina was first formally described in 1982 by Lawrence Johnson in the Journal of the Adelaide Botanic Gardens. In the same paper, Johnson transferred some species previously included in Casuarina to the new genus, and nominated Allocasuarina torulosa Aiton L.A.S.Johnson as the type species. The name Allocasuarina means "other Casuarina". ("Allo-" in Greek means "other".)

== List of species ==
The following is a list of Allocasuarina accepted by the Australian Plant Census and Plants of the World Online as of April 2023:

- Allocasuarina acuaria (F.Muell.) L.A.S.Johnson (W.A.)
- Allocasuarina acutivalvis (F.Muell.) L.A.S.Johnson (W.A.)
- Allocasuarina anfractuosa Wege & S.R.Barrett (W.A.)
- Allocasuarina brachystachya L.A.S.Johnson (N.S.W.)
- Allocasuarina campestris (Diels) L.A.S.Johnson (W.A.)
- Allocasuarina corniculata (F.Muell.) L.A.S.Johnson (W.A.)
- Allocasuarina crassa L.A.S.Johnson – Cape Pillar sheoak (Tas.)
- Allocasuarina decaisneana (F.Muell.) L.A.S.Johnson – desert oak, desert sheoak (N.T., W.A., S.A.)
- Allocasuarina decussata (Benth.) L.A.S.Johnson – karri oak (W.A.)
- Allocasuarina defungens L.A.S.Johnson – dwarf heath casuarina (N.S.W.)
- Allocasuarina dielsiana (C.A.Gardner) L.A.S.Johnson – northern sheoak (W.A.)
- Allocasuarina diminuta L.A.S.Johnson (N.S.W.)
- Allocasuarina distyla (Vent.) L.A.S.Johnson – scrub she-oak (N.S.W.)
- Allocasuarina drummondiana (Miq.) L.A.S.Johnson (W.A.)
- Allocasuarina duncanii L.A.S.Johnson & D.I.Morris – Duncan's sheoak, conical sheoak (Tas.)
- Allocasuarina eriochlamys (L.A.S.Johnson) L.A.S.Johnson (W.A.)
- Allocasuarina fibrosa (C.A.Gardner) L.A.S.Johnson – woolly sheoak (W.A.)
- Allocasuarina filidens L.A.S.Johnson – Mount Beerwah sheoak (Qld.)
- Allocasuarina fraseriana (Miq.) L.A.S.Johnson – western sheoak (W.A.)
- Allocasuarina glareicola L.A.S.Johnson (N.S.W.)
- Allocasuarina globosa L.A.S.Johnson (W.A.)
- Allocasuarina grampiana L.A.S.Johnson – Grampians sheoak (Vic.)
- Allocasuarina grevilleoides (Diels) L.A.S.Johnson
- Allocasuarina gymnanthera L.A.S.Johnson (N.S.W.)
- Allocasuarina helmsii (Ewart & M. Gordon) L.A.S.Johnson (W.A., S.A.)
- Allocasuarina huegeliana (Miq.) L.A.S.Johnson – rock sheoak (W.A.)
- Allocasuarina humilis (Otto & A.Dietr.) L.A.S.Johnson – dwarf sheoak (W.A.)
- Allocasuarina hystricosa Wege (W.A.)
- Allocasuarina inophloia (F.Muell. & F.M.Bailey) L.A.S.Johnson – stringybark she-oak (Qld., N.S.W.)
- Allocasuarina lehmanniana (Miq.) L.A.S.Johnson – dune sheoak (W.A.)
- Allocasuarina littoralis (Salisb.) L.A.S.Johnson – black she-oak (Qld., N.S.W., A.C.T., Vic., Tas.)
- Allocasuarina luehmannii (R.T.Baker) L.A.S.Johnson – bull-oak, buloke (Qld., N.S.W., A.C.T., Vic., TAS.)
- Allocasuarina mackliniana L.A.S.Johnson (Vic., S.A.)
- Allocasuarina media L.A.S.Johnson (Vic.)
- Allocasuarina microstachya (Miq.) L.A.S.Johnson (W.A.)
- Allocasuarina misera L.A.S.Johnson (Vic.)
- Allocasuarina monilifera (L.A.S.Johnson) L.A.S.Johnson – necklace sheoak (Tas.)
- Allocasuarina muelleriana (Miq.) L.A.S.Johnson – slaty sheoak (S.A., Vic.)
- Allocasuarina nana (Sieber ex Spreng.) L.A.S.Johnson – dwarf she-oak, stunted sheoak (N.S.W., Vic.)
- Allocasuarina ophiolitica L.A.S.Johnson (N.S.W.)
- Allocasuarina paludosa (Sieber ex Spreng.) L.A.S.Johnson – swamp she-oak, scrub sheoak (N.S.W., Vic., S.A., Tas.)
- Allocasuarina paradoxa (Macklin) L.A.S.Johnson (Vic.)
- Allocasuarina pinaster (C.A.Gardner) L.A.S.Johnson – compass bush (W.A.)
- Allocasuarina portuensis L.A.S.Johnson – Nielsen Park she-oak (N.S.W.)
- Allocasuarina pusilla (Macklin) L.A.S.Johnson – heath oak-bush, dwarf sheoak (Vic, S.A.)
- Allocasuarina ramosissima (C.A.Gardner) L.A.S.Johnson (W.A.)
- Allocasuarina rigida (Miq.) L.A.S.Johnson (N.S.W., Qld.)
- Allocasuarina robusta (Macklin) L.A.S.Johnson – Mount Compass oak-bush (S.A.)
- Allocasuarina rupicola L.A.S.Johnson – shrubby she-oak (N.S.W., Qld.)
- Allocasuarina scleroclada (L.A.S.Johnson) L.A.S.Johnson (W.A.)
- Allocasuarina simulans L.A.S.Johnson – Nabiac casuarina (N.S.W.)
- Allocasuarina spinosissima (C.A.Gardner) L.A.S.Johnson (W.A.)
- Allocasuarina striata (Macklin) L.A.S.Johnson – small bull oak, stalked oak-bush, tall oak-bush (S.A.)
- Allocasuarina tessellata (C.A.Gardner) L.A.S.Johnson (W.A.)
- Allocasuarina thalassoscopica L.A.S.Johnson (N.S.W., Qld.)
- Allocasuarina thuyoides (Miq.) L.A.S.Johnson – horned she-oak (W.A.)
- Allocasuarina tortiramula E.M.Benn. – twisted sheoak (W.A.)
- Allocasuarina torulosa (Aiton) L.A.S.Johnson – forest oak, rose sheoak, river oak, Baker's oak (N.S.W., Qld.)
- Allocasuarina trichodon (Miq.) L.A.S.Johnson (W.A.)
- Allocasuarina verticillata (Lam.) L.A.S.Johnson – drooping sheoak (N.S.W., A.C.T., Vic., S.A., Tas.)
- Allocasuarina zephyrea L.A.S.Johnson (Tas.)

== Distribution and habitat ==
Plants in the genus Allocasuarina usually grow in nutrient-deficient soils and are endemic to southern Australia, but 4 species occur in north-eastern Queensland, and one in the north of Western Australia.
