= Daintree River =

Daintree
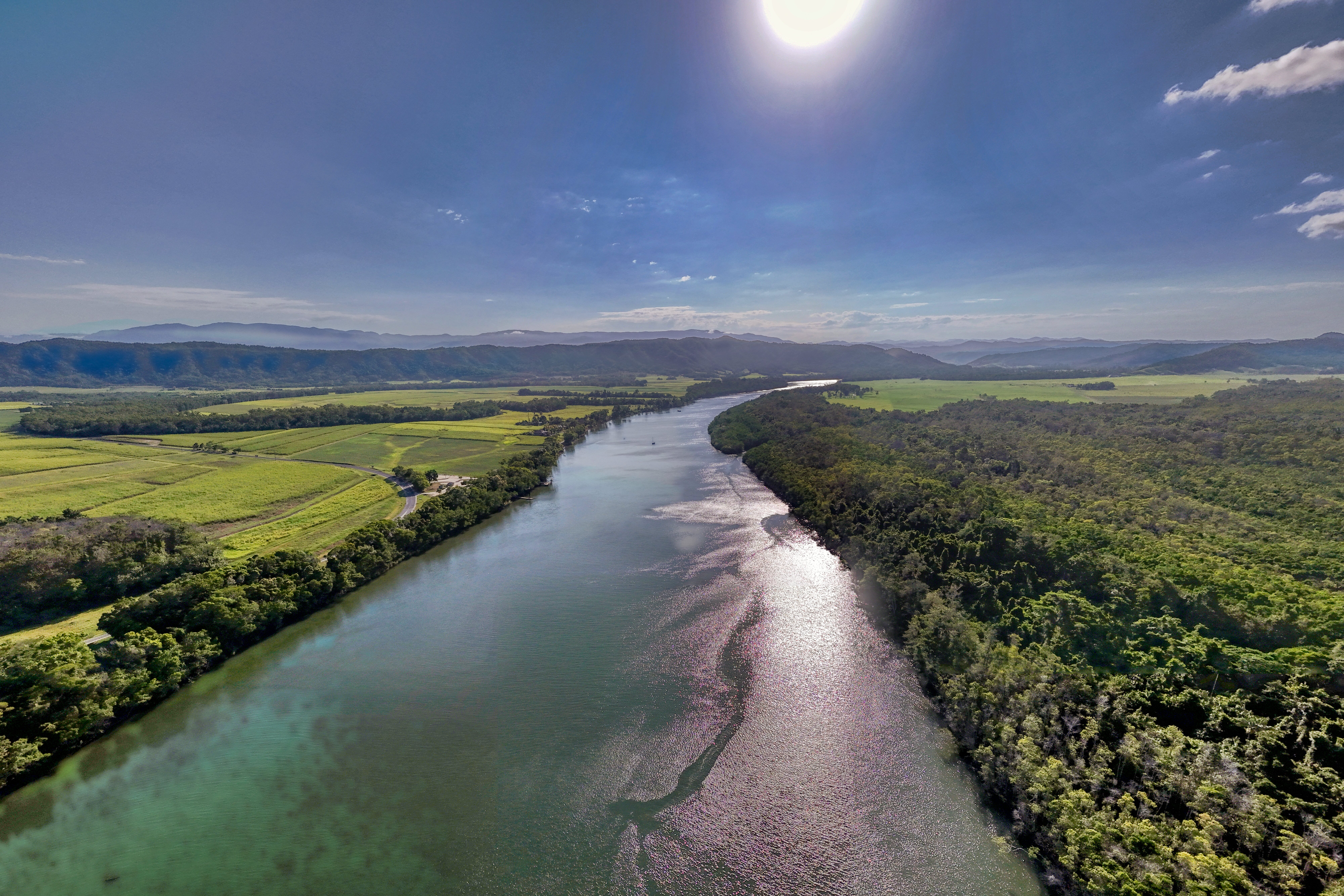

- Location of the Daintree River mouth in Queensland
- Etymology: Richard Daintree, an English geologist

Location
- Country: Australia
- State: Queensland
- Region: Far North Queensland

Physical characteristics
- Source: Daintree National Park, Great Dividing Range
  - location: below Kalkajaka
  - coordinates: 16.3929°S 145.2025°E
  - elevation: 1,270 m (4,170 ft)
- Mouth: Coral Sea
  - location: Cairns Marine Park
  - coordinates: 16.2889°S 145.4525°E
  - elevation: 0 m (0 ft)
- Length: 140 km (87 mi)
- Basin size: 2,107 km^{2} (814 sq mi) to 1,303.5 km^{2} (503.3 sq mi)
- Discharge
  - location: mouth
  - average: 56.65 m^{3}/s (1,788 GL/a)

Basin features
- Tributaries
  - left: Boolbun Creek
  - right: Douglas Creek
- National park: Daintree National Park; Cairns Marine Park

The Daintree River is a river that rises in the Daintree Rainforest near Cape Tribulation in Far North Queensland, Australia. It flows into the Coral Sea. The river is part of the traditional lands of the Eastern Kuku Yalanji people, and is located about 100 kilometres (62 mi) northwest of Cairns in the UNESCO World Heritage–listed Wet Tropics of Queensland. Although this area is part of the Eastern Kuku Yalanji Native Title area, it is also a tourist attraction.

== Course and features ==
The river rises on the eastern slopes of the Great Dividing Range near Black Mountain, within the Daintree National Park, at an elevation of 1,270 metres (4,170 ft) AHD. The river flows in highly meandering course generally north, then east, then south and then east, through the rainforest where the water is fresh. At this convergence point, an abundance of wildlife congregate, particularly fish. The river is joined by two minor tributaries before flowing through the Cairns Marine Park through thick mangrove swamps where the water is highly saline; and then empties into the Coral Sea, north of Wonga Beach. The mouth of the Daintree River opens onto a giant sandbar that shifts with each changing tide. The river descends 1,270 metres (4,170 ft) over its 127-kilometre (79 mi) course.

The catchment area of the river occupies an area of 2,107 square kilometres (814 sq mi) of which 33 square kilometres (13 sq mi) is composed of estuarine wetlands.

=== Flooding ===
The river is surrounded by mountains and deep valleys. Combined with the climatic conditions of the region the river is prone to quickly developing floods with little warning due to the high rainfalls on the 1,000-metre-high (3,300 ft) mountain ranges around the catchment and the influence of the cyclonic forces moving in from the adjacent Coral Sea. In March 1996, record flood levels swamped roads and properties throughout the Daintree region. Statistics gathered at the time recorded 606 millimetres (23.9 in) of rain falling in 24 hours.

In 2011, two new causeways were completed over Cape Tribulation Road, making the drive mostly floodproof in all but the most severe rain events. In particular, the notorious bottleneck at Cooper Creek was raised 3 metres (9.8 ft).

In 2019, the river peaked at 12.6 metres at Daintree breaking the 1901 record of 12.4 metres.

In 2023, a new record of 15 metres was recorded at Daintree after torrential rains from ex-Cyclone Jasper flooded the catchment.

== Attraction ==
People are drawn to the area for its ancient vegetation, scenic surroundings, and the diverse array of native wildlife and plant species that inhabit the area.

Currently, there is no bridge to enable crossing the river, so access is limited to the Daintree River Ferry, a commercial ferry that traverses the river for the purpose of tourism. Other features that surround the river include Kalkajaka, Daintree Range, Thornton Peak and the Cape Tribulation Rainforest. The Daintree River is home to a dazzling array of tropical life.

== History ==
=== Indigenous history ===
The Kuku Yulanji is the indigenous people who once inhabited the regions surrounded by the Daintree River. The tribespeople were hunter-gatherers who lived in groups of eight to twelve, camping along the banks of the river and living on a staple diet that included a selection of bush tucker harvested from the vegetation from the forest surrounding the Daintree. It has been estimated that the tribe resided on the banks of the Daintree river for over 9,000 years.

=== European history ===
Due to the ever-shifting deep centre of the sandbar, entering the Daintree River has always been a problem for ship captains. The area was missed by Captain Cook when passing in the voyage where his ship was wrecked on the Great Barrier Reef. The Daintree River was first seen by Europeans in 1873 after they were attracted to nearby regions due to its vast natural reserves of gold. George Elphinstone Dalrymple, the Queensland Gold Commissioner on the Gilberton gold field at that time, was the first European to visit the river and he named the river in honour of Richard Daintree, an English geologist and the Agent-General for Queensland in London. The Daintree was rated second to the Proserpine River, as the river in Queensland where people were most likely to spot a saltwater crocodile, between 2000 and 2012, with 145 sightings recorded over the period.

== World Heritage listing ==
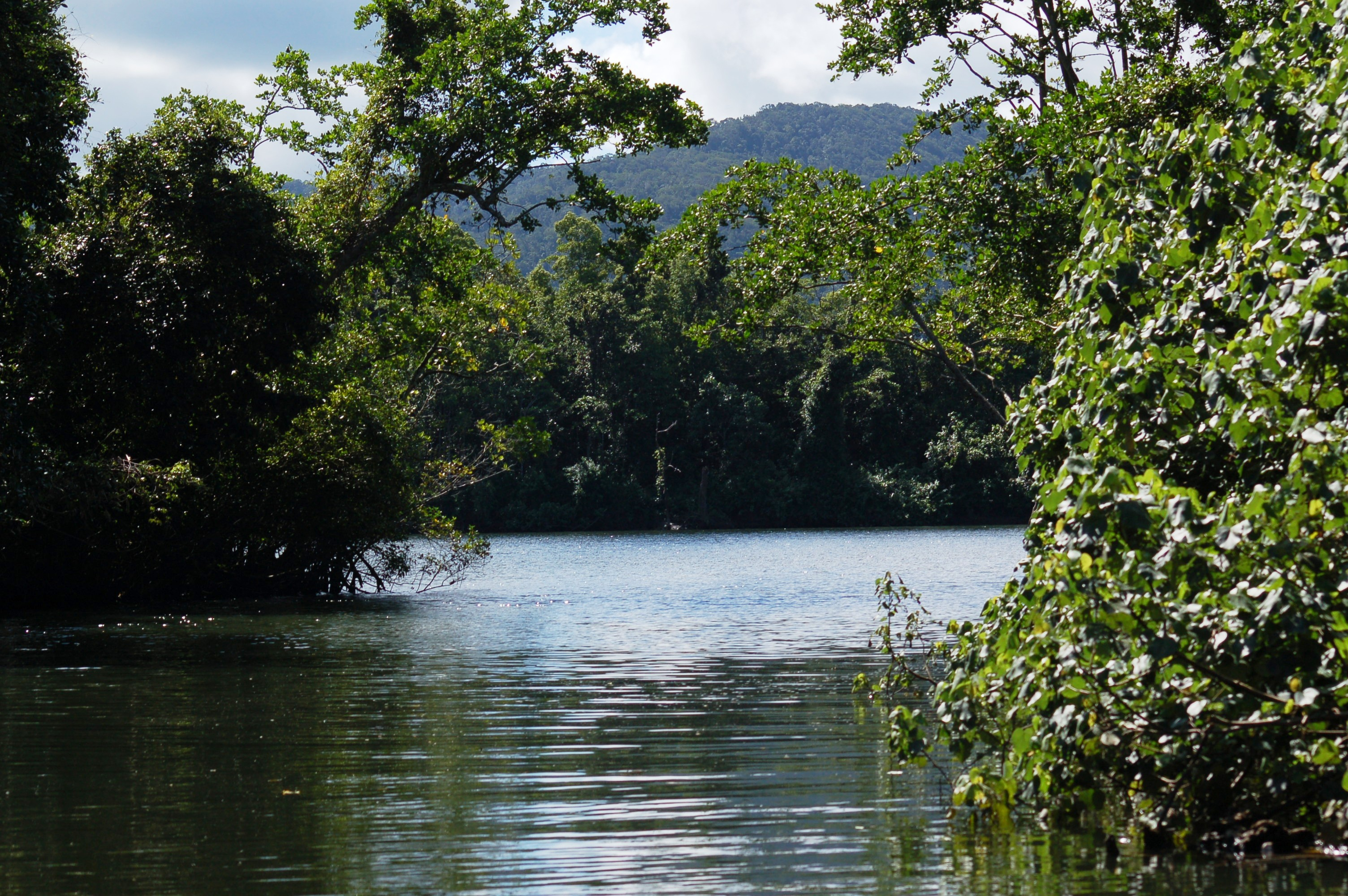
Confluent of tributary (foreground) and the Daintree (background)

The Wet Tropics of Queensland was given UNESCO World Heritage listing, inclusive of the Daintree River, in recognition of "its outstanding natural universal value as an outstanding example representing: the major stages of Earth's evolutionary history, significant ongoing ecological and biological processes, superlative natural phenomena, and as containing important and significant habitats for in situ conservation of biological diversity. The river is part of the much larger Daintree Rainforest region in Northern Queensland encompassing 894,000 hectares (2,210,000 acres).

== Flora and fauna ==
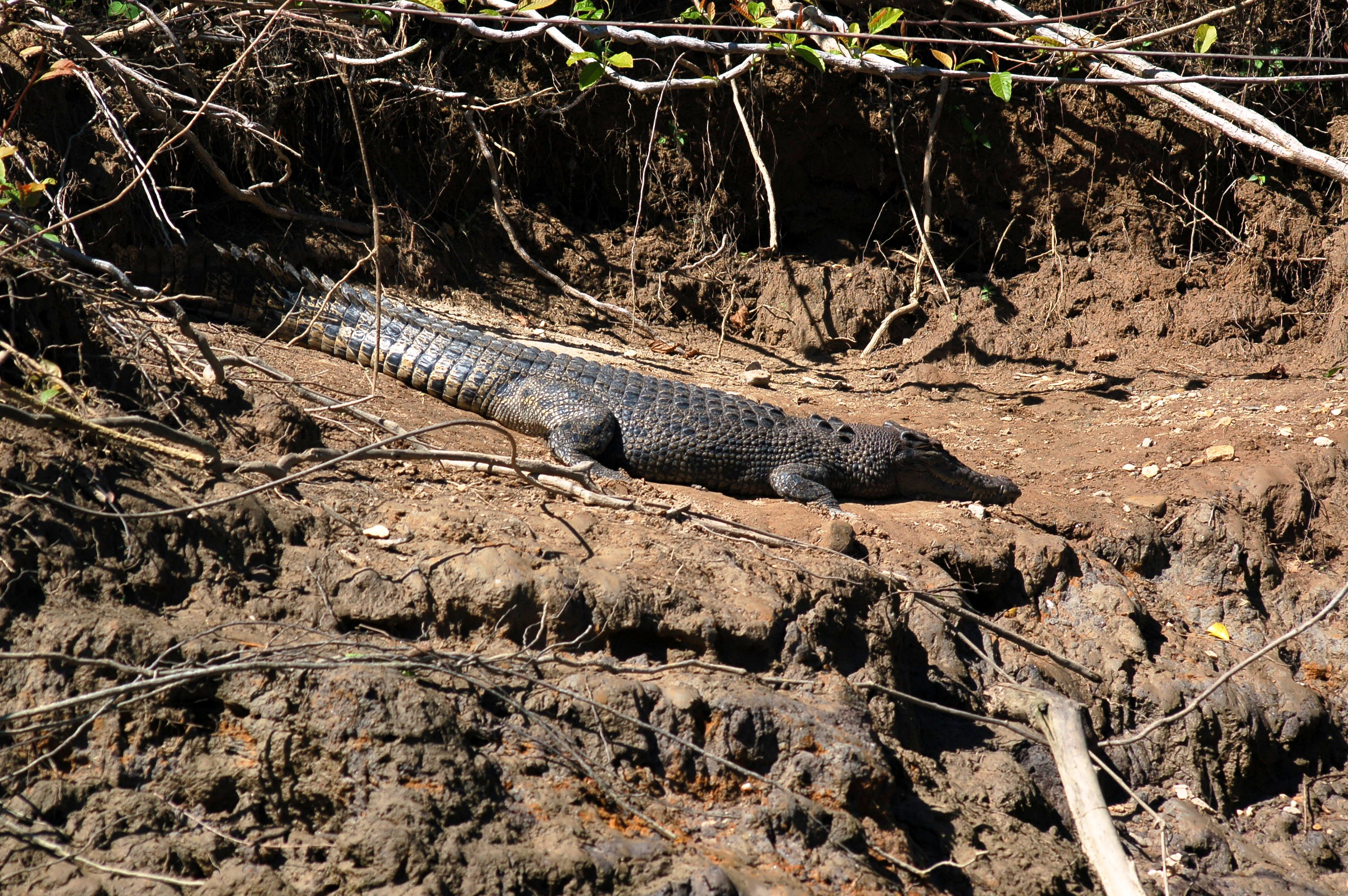
Female crocodile in the Daintree River

The river and its surroundings are home to some of the most primitive forms of animal and plant life in the world. The surrounding mountains and valleys provided protection from the forces to adapt to climate change by sheltering several species of plants. A notable example is the primitive She-oak Gymnostoma australianum. This pine-like tree is the only remaining species in the Gymnostoma group of plants in Australia, and is now restricted to very isolated pockets north of the Daintree River. The genus was once widespread throughout Gondwana, and its relatives are still found in parts of the Pacific and south-east Asia.

Of the five species of ringtail possum found in north Queensland rainforests, the cinereus ringtail possum (Pseudochirulus cinereus) is almost wholly restricted to the Daintree catchment. Within the park, this species is found only in upland rainforest on Thornton Peak and the upper reaches of the Daintree and Mossman Rivers. Once considered a light-coloured form of the Herbert River ringtail possum, commonly found throughout the Atherton Tablelands, it was described as a distinct species in 1989. Black and white striped possums (Dactylopsila trivirgata) are quite common throughout the park, particularly in the coastal lowlands north of the Daintree River, although to see one while spotlighting requires a mixture of luck and know-how.

Due to the river's isolation, saltwater crocodiles - once threatened in the region due to hunting - have flourished in recent years, beingbeneficiaries of legislation that protects them. There have been numerous reports of deaths in the Daintree River from crocodile attacks. Authorities warn tourists and visitors not to step close to the riverbank, and stay within the confines of boats, and absolutely never swim in the river.

== See also ==
- List of rivers of Australia § Queensland
