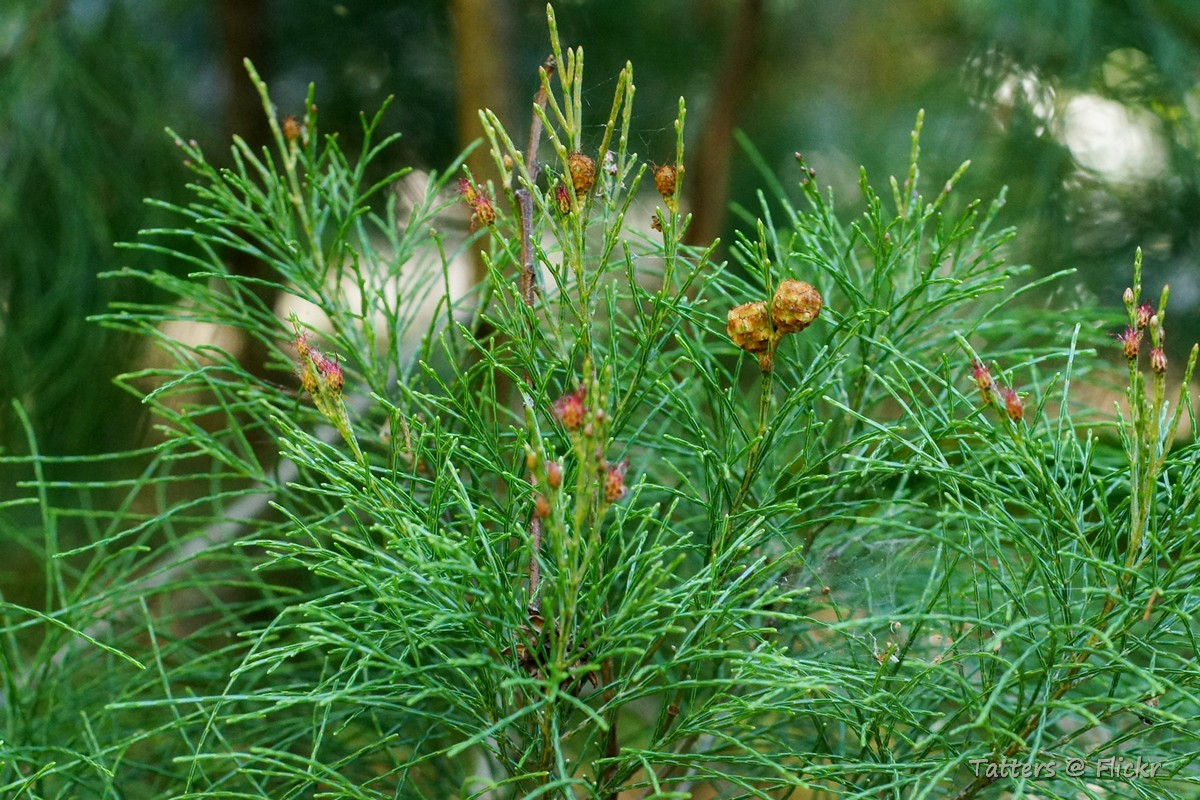
- Foliage, fruits and flowers

Conservation status
- Vulnerable (NCA)

Scientific classification
- Kingdom: Plantae
- Clade: Tracheophytes
- Clade: Angiosperms
- Clade: Eudicots
- Clade: Rosids
- Order: Fagales
- Family: Casuarinaceae
- Genus: Gymnostoma
- Species: G. australianum

Binomial name
- Gymnostoma australianum L.A.S.Johnson

= Gymnostoma australianum =

Species of tree endemic to Australia

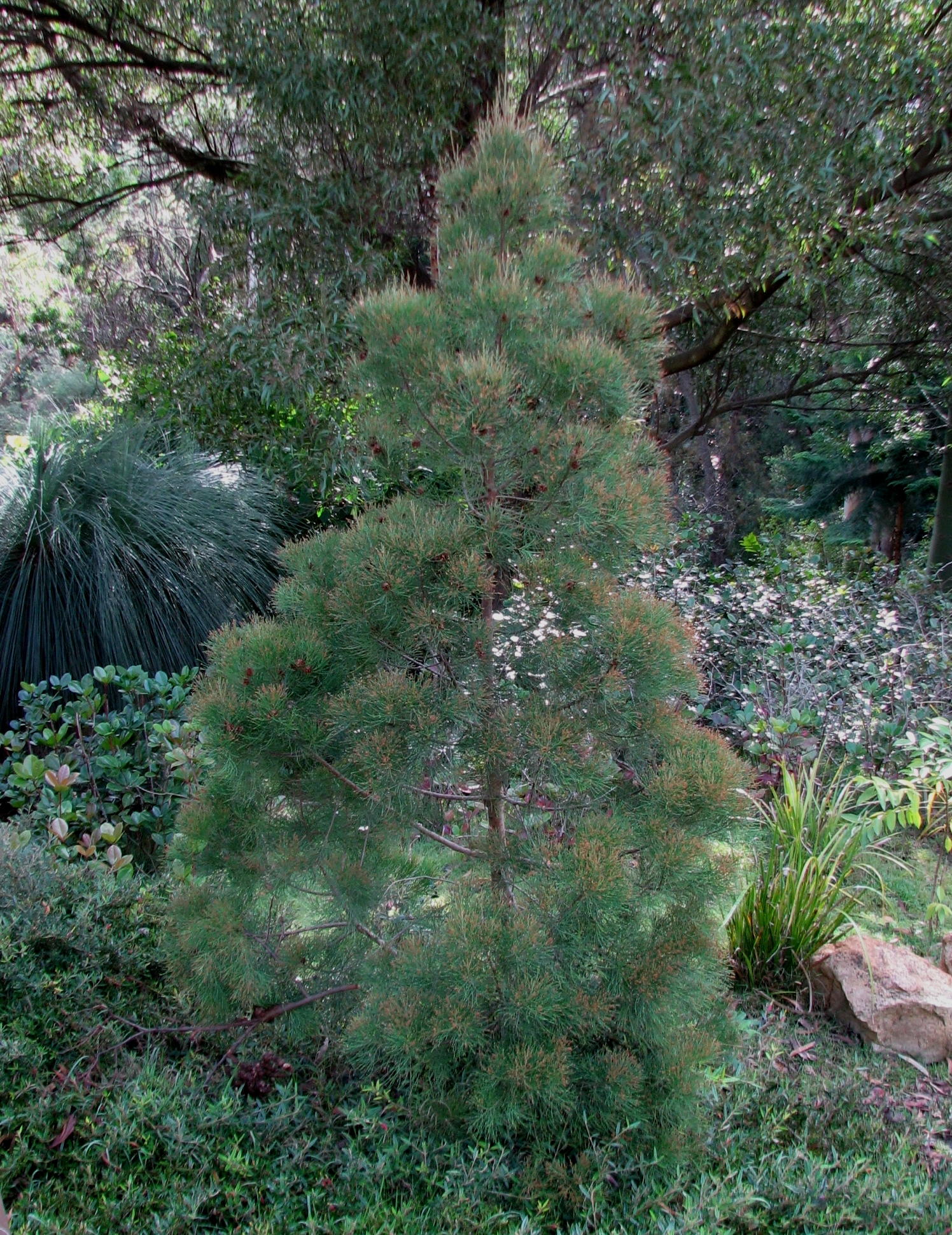
Young tree, cultivated at Australian National Botanic Gardens

Gymnostoma australianum, sometimes known as oak, is a species of flowering plant that is endemic to a restricted area of the Daintree tropical rainforests of north-eastern Queensland, Australia. It is a member of the 'she-oak' family Casuarinaceae, members of which are characterised by fine, drooping, evergreen foliage. Superficially they look like some conifers such as Cupressus in the northern hemisphere and Callitris in the southern hemisphere.

== Description ==
It grows into a small tree between 4 and 7 m (13 and 23 ft) tall with buttress roots and fissured bark. New shoots are covered in fine white or reddish brown hairs. The twigs are green and four-angled, and the leaves are reduced to tiny 'teeth' less than 1 mm (0.04 in) long. The roots have nitrogen-fixing nodules.

These trees may be either dioecious (with male and female flowers on separate plants), or monoecious (with both flowers on the same plant). Male flowers are borne on spikes about 2 mm (0.079 in) long; female flowers are without a perianth. The fruit is a small cylindrical cone about 10 mm (0.39 in) wide and long. They contain a number of samaras about 8 mm (0.31 in) long.

== Taxonomy ==
Gymnostoma is a small genus of 14 species (as of December 2025), occurring in Malesia, the western Pacific, and Queensland. It was erected in 1980 by botanist Lawrence Alexander Sidney Johnson, who also described this species in 1989.

== Distribution and habitat ==
This species is found in the area between the Daintree River and Cape Tribulation, in the vicinity of Thornton Peak. It has been described as a 'habitat specialist', being restricted to exposed sites with shallow, granite-derived, acidic soils such as stream banks, river islands and granite outcrops, and it does not colonise newly-disturbed areas of the surrounding rainforest. The altitudinal range is from sea level to about 1,350 m (4,430 ft), with the granite outcrops mostly occurring in the higher part of the range.

== Conservation ==
Gymnostoma australianum has been given the conservation status of vulnerable under the Queensland government's Nature Conservation Act. As of December 2025, it has not been assessed by the IUCN.
