= Daintree Rainforest =

Region in Queensland, Australia

Coordinates: 16°12′S 145°24′E

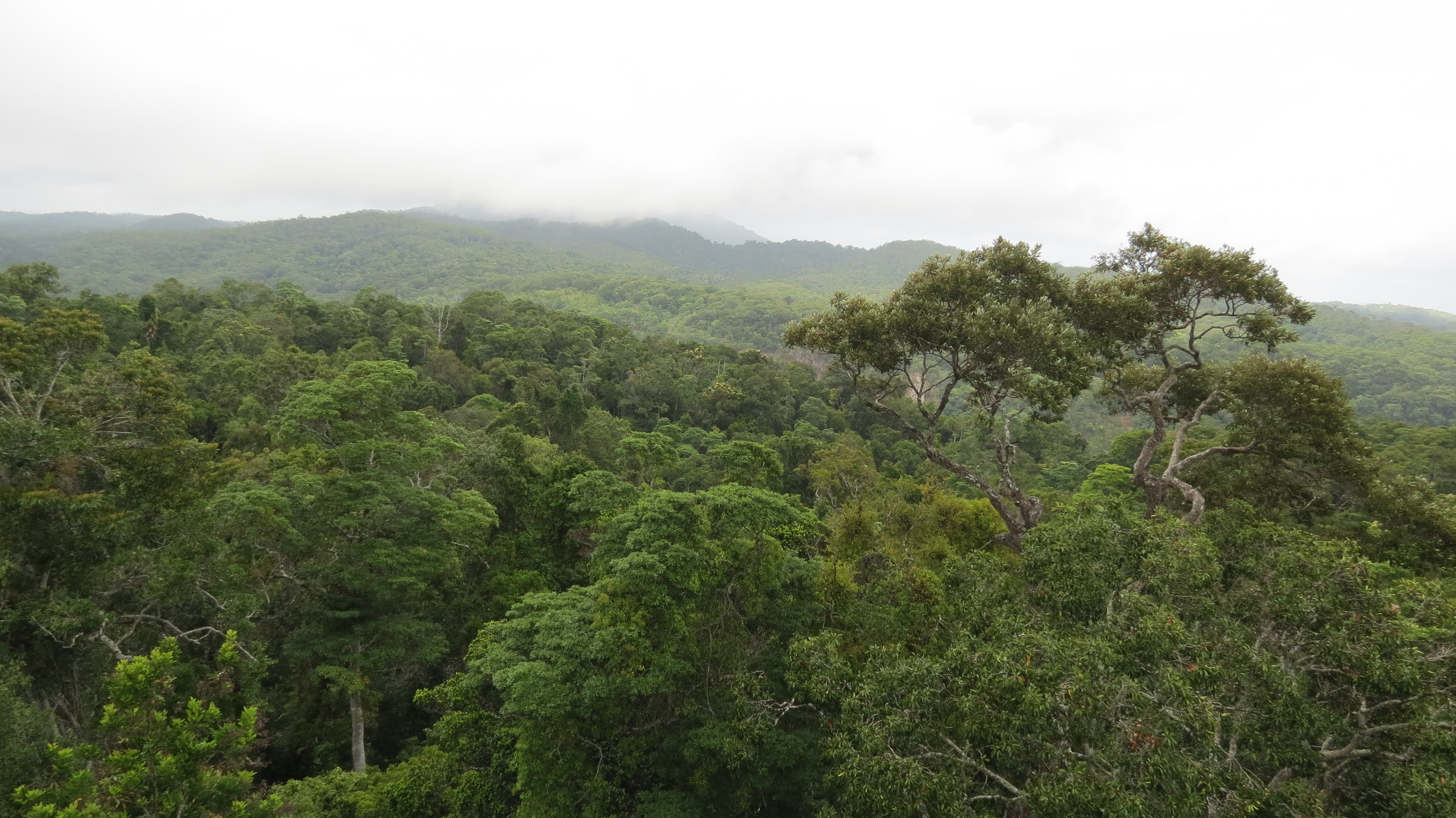
Panorama of the rainforest, 2013

The Daintree Rainforest, also known as the Daintree, is a region on the northeastern coast of Queensland, Australia, about 105 km (65 mi), by road, north of the city of Cairns. Whilst the terms "Daintree Rainforest" and "the Daintree" are not officially defined, it is generally accepted and understood that they refer to the area from the Daintree River north to Cooktown, and from the coastline west to the Great Dividing Range. The popular tourist destination of Mossman Gorge, some 30 km (19 mi) south of the Daintree River, is often (and again, unofficially) included in the definition.

At around 1,200 square kilometres (460 sq mi), the Daintree is a part of the largest contiguous area of tropical rainforest in Australia, known as the Wet Tropics of Queensland. The region, along with a select number of other rainforest areas on the Australian east coast, collectively form some of the oldest extant rainforest communities in the world. At around 180 million years old, these ancient, self-sustaining forests are nearly 100 million years older than the Amazon of South America (the world’s largest rainforest and top region for biodiversity), and have witnessed dinosaurs, ice ages, and early humans all come and go.

In 2009 as part of the Q150 celebrations, the Daintree Rainforest was announced as one of the Q150 Icons of Queensland for its role as a "natural attraction".

== History and description ==
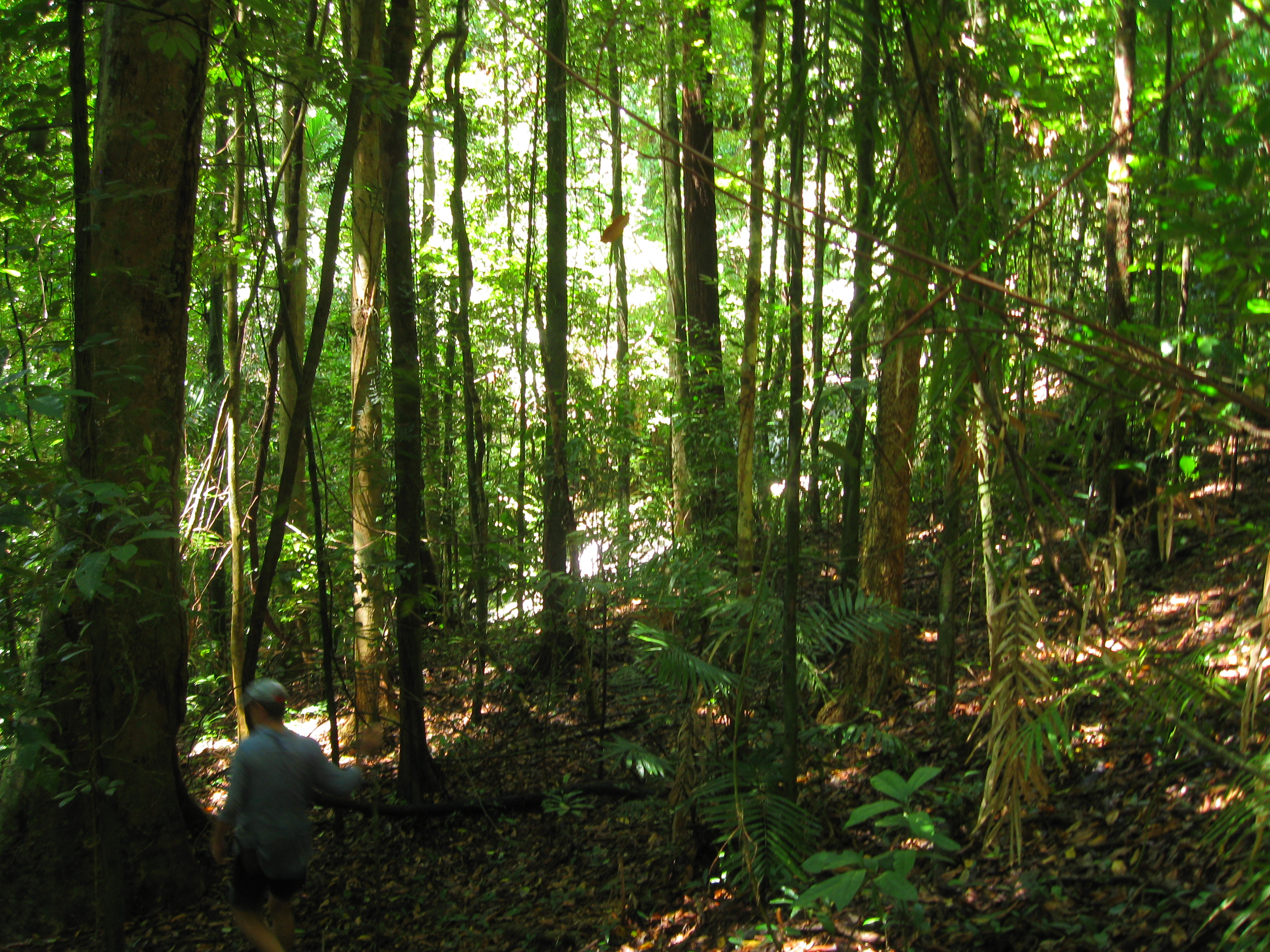
Rainforest in 2011

The rainforest is named after the Daintree River, which in turn was named in honour of the Australian geologist and photographer Richard Daintree (1832–1878). It is a remnant of what was once a vast forest that covered the entire Australian continent. It is a rare survivor of 120 million years of altered climatic conditions resulting from continental drift, which has reduced the extent of the original forest to a few restricted areas on the east coast.

The area includes the Daintree National Park, some areas of State Forest, and some privately owned land, including a residential community. Some of the privately owned land north of the Peninsula Range is being progressively purchased for conservation purposes under a $15 million government scheme involving equal contributions from the Cairns Regional, the Queensland, and the Australian Governments. As of May 2011, 72% of the properties earmarked for buyback or compensation had been secured. These 'buyback' areas of tropical rainforest included 215 blocks of land purchased by the Queensland Parks and Wildlife Service, and 13 purchased by private conservation agencies.

The Daintree Rainforest contains approximately 3,000 different plant species, from nearly 210 plant families; with over 900 different types of tree, one single hectare could, realistically, contain anywhere from 100 to 150 individual species. The forests contain 30% of the total frog, reptile and marsupial species in Australia, 90% of the continent's bat and butterfly species, 7% of the country's bird species, and over 12,000 species of insects, along with a multitude of lower animals, fungi, lichens, mosses, and microorganisms – all within an area constituting 0.12% of Australia's landmass. Part of the forest is protected by the Daintree National Park and drained by the Daintree River. The roads north of the river wind through areas of lush forest, and have been designed to minimize impacts on this ancient ecosystem.

On 29 September 2021, the eastern Kuku Yalanji people won formal ownership of 160,213 hectares (395,890 acres) of country stretching from Mossman to Cooktown, including the Daintree National Park after a historic deal was made between the traditional custodians and the Queensland Government, on top of an earlier Native Title agreement.

== Exploring ==
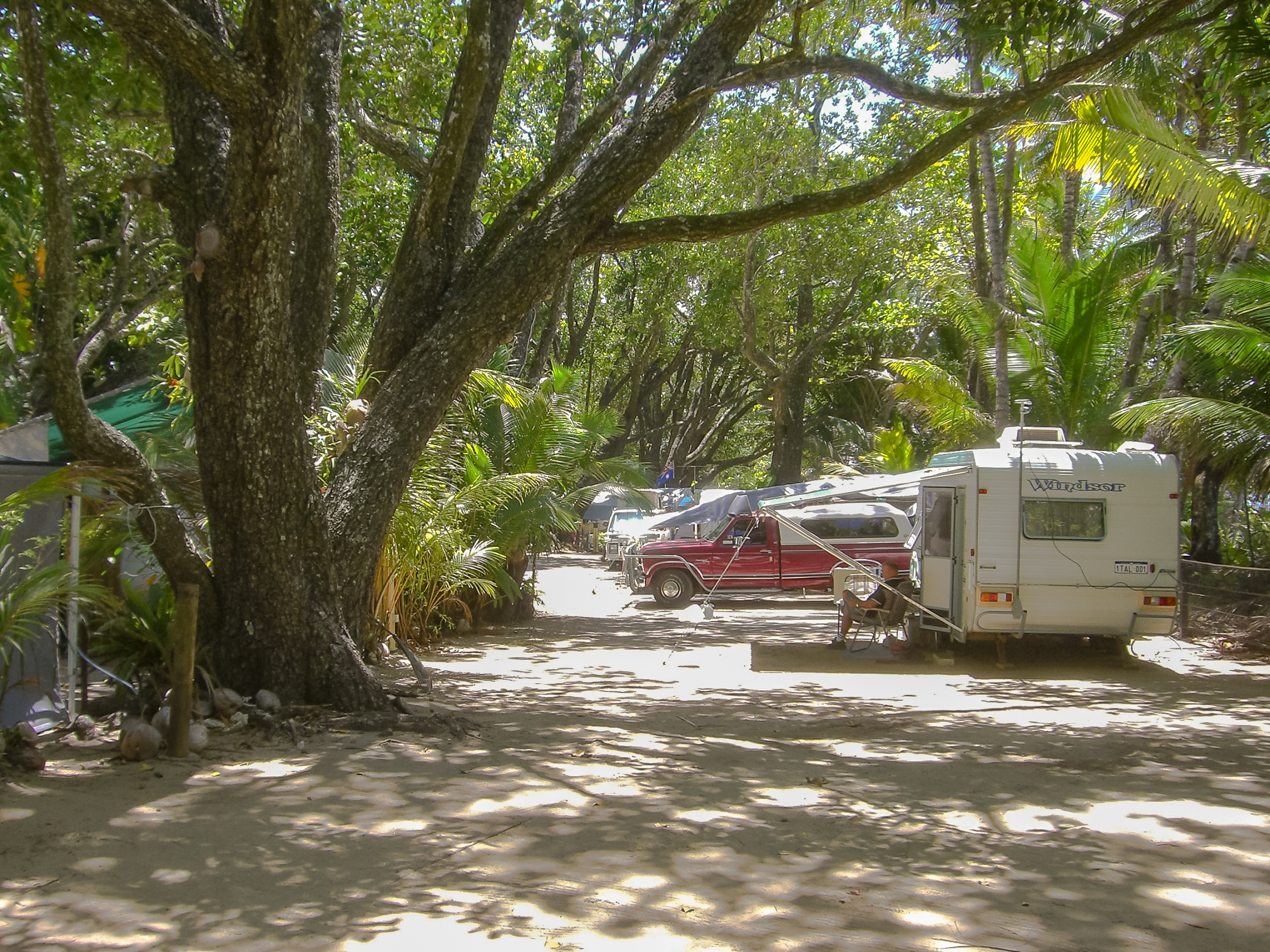
Camping at Daintree National Park 2009

The Daintree region combines tropical rainforest, white sandy beaches, and fringing reefs just offshore, which is a rare combination. Due to the distance between attractions, driving is often the simplest way to navigate between them. The Daintree National Park boasts many walking tracks and there are a number of accommodation options within the Daintree Rainforest itself.

To the west of Cape Tribulation stands Mt Pieter Botte with its massive granite outcrops. The summit provides expansive vistas of undisturbed forest and to the south, the skyline is dominated by the giant granite boulders of Thornton Peak – one of Queensland's highest mountains.

Much of the Daintree Rainforest is part of the Wet Tropics of Queensland World Heritage Site, being listed by UNESCO in 1988 in recognition of its universal natural values highlighted by the rainforest. Blockades against road building through the rainforest occurred in 1983 and 1984 and were followed by a major lobbying campaign which eventually secured protection for the area.

Amongst the attributes provided as evidence for the World Heritage value of the Wet Tropics, which include the Daintree Rainforest, the Australian Government lists the following:

They preserve major stages of the earth's evolutionary history -

- ancient plants representing some of the earliest land plants, the Psilotopsida (whisk ferns) and the Lycopsida (club mosses or tassel ferns);
- 7 ancient families of true ferns, including the Marattiaceae (giant or king ferns), Osmundaceae (royal ferns), Schizaeaceae (comb ferns) and Gleicheniaceae (coral ferns);
- fern genera of East Gondwanan origins, including Polystichum (shield ferns), Leptopteris, Todea, Tmesipteris (fork ferns), Lycopodiella and Huperzia (club mosses and tassel ferns);
- the ancient, fern-like cycad Bowenia spectabilis (zamia fern) and other cycads including Cycas, and the giant Lepidozamia hopei (zamia palm);
- ancient conifers such as Podocarpus (plum pine or brown pine), Prumnopitys (brown pine or southern yew), Araucaria (hoop and bunya pines), and Agathis (kauri) which are living counterparts of Jurassic-age fossils (i.e., age of the dinosaurs);
- 12 primitive flowering plant families, including small, primitive, relict angiosperm families such as Austrobaileyaceae, Calycanthaceae, Eupomatiaceae and Himantandraceae;
- relict angiosperm plant families that are known as fossils from the Cretaceous (last age of the dinosaurs) including Cunoniaceae, Proteaceae (banksia and macadamia family), Winteraceae, Myrtaceae (eucalypt and lilly pilly), Monimiaceae, Rutaceae, Sapindaceae, Aquifoliaceae (holly family), Chloranthaceae, Trimeniaceae, Epacridaceae (heath family), Olacaceae and families of angiosperms to represent the longest continuous history associated with the Gondwanan landmass.

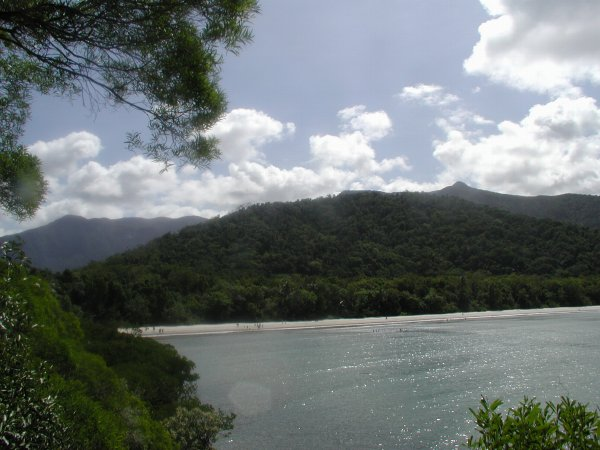
The Daintree Rainforest straddles Cape Tribulation

They preserve unique, rare or superlative natural phenomena, formations or features of exceptional natural beauty –

- exceptional coastal scenery unusual in the world (and Australia) where tropical rainforest extends to white sandy beaches with fringing coral reefs just offshore;
- rugged mountain peaks and gorges with swiftly flowing rivers and spectacular waterfalls (e.g., Thornton Peak, Mossman Gorge, Roaring Meg Falls);
- extensive vistas of undisturbed forest and valleys.

The Daintree rainforest contains important and significant habitats for conservation of biological diversity. Approximately 430 species of birds live among the trees. The primitive flowering plants Austrobaileya scandens and Idiospermum australiense are also endemic to the Daintree. However, The Daintree Region is home to a number of rare and endangered species, including the southern cassowary (Casuarius Casuarius) and Bennett's tree-kangaroo (Dendrolagus bennettianus).

== Daintree Important Bird Area ==
The Daintree Important Bird Area (IBA) is a 2,656 km^{2} (1,025 sq mi) tract of land that largely coincides with the northernmost part of the Wet Tropics of Queensland. It encompasses, or overlaps, the Kalkajaka, Ngalba Bulal, Daintree, Mount Windsor and Mowbray National Parks.

It has been identified as an IBA by BirdLife International because it supports a population of southern cassowaries. It also contains populations of the locally endemic tooth-billed and golden bowerbirds, lovely fairywrens, Macleay's, bridled, yellow-spotted and white-streaked honeyeaters, fernwrens, Atherton scrubwrens, mountain thornbills, chowchillas, Bower's shrike-thrushes, pied monarchs, Victoria's riflebirds and pale-yellow robins.

== See also ==
- Cape York Peninsula
- Forests of Australia
- Queensland tropical rain forests
