= Gymnostoma nobile =

Scientific classification
- Kingdom: Plantae
- Clade: Tracheophytes
- Clade: Angiosperms
- Clade: Eudicots
- Clade: Rosids
- Order: Fagales
- Family: Casuarinaceae
- Genus: Gymnostoma
- Species: G. nobile

Binomial name
- Gymnostoma nobile (Whitmore) L.A.S.Johnson (1982)

Synonyms
- Casuarina nobilis Whitmore (1975)

Species of tree endemic to Australia

Gymnostoma nobile is a species of tree endemic to northern Borneo.

Gymnostoma nobile is native to heath forests, also known as kerangas forests, which grow on nutrient-poor soils. It is a nitrogen-fixing plant.
