= Queensland Parks and Wildlife Service =

Government agency in Australia

Division overview
- Formed: 5 June 1975
- Type: Protected area and wildlife management
- Jurisdiction: Queensland
- Headquarters: 400 George Street, Brisbane
- Minister responsible: Andrew Powell, Minister for Environment and Tourism and Minister for Science and Innovation
- Division executive: Ben Klaassen, Deputy Director-General
- Parent department: Department of Environment, Tourism, Science and Innovation
- Website: parks.qld.gov.au

The Queensland Parks and Wildlife Service (QPWS) is a division within the Department of the Environment, Tourism, Science and Innovation of the Queensland Government. The QPWS is responsible for the management of the state’s protected areas and wildlife, including national parks, state forests and marine sanctuaries, with the aim of preserving them for current and future generations.

Areas managed by the QPWS include more than 1000 national parks, state forests, marine parks and other protected areas, as well as five world heritage sites. Of these protected areas, 325 are national parks as of August 2026. See Protected areas of Queensland.

Queensland’s first national park, Witches Falls (in today’s Tamborine National Park), was established on 28 March 1908, followed by Bunya Mountains National Park in July 1908, and then Lamington National Park in 1915. From modest beginnings within the Forestry Department, a dedicated national parks service was established in 1975; the Queensland National Parks and Wildlife Service. From that time, park rangers have worn badges featuring the QPWS mascot, Herbie (Herbert River ringtail possum), which has become one of the most well-recognised symbols in Queensland. In 1998, the name was abbreviated to the Queensland Parks and Wildlife Service by a departmental arrangements notice, and the wording on the badge was updated to reflect this change.

The Nature Conservation Act 1992 and the Marine Parks Act 2004 provide guiding legislation for the QPWS. Under that regulation, Queensland has several legally distinct national-park classes: ordinary National Parks, National Parks (scientific), National Parks (Aboriginal land), and National Parks (Cape York Peninsula Aboriginal land/CYPAL).

As of early 2026, Andrew Powell is the minister responsible for the department. The agency's head office is located at 400 George Street in the Brisbane central business district.

== Functions ==
Protected areas in Queensland are needed to provide wildlife habitat to maintain biodiversity and provide opportunities for outdoor nature-based activities. Managing national parks involves protecting a park's natural condition and processes, presenting the park's cultural and natural resources and its values; and ensuring that park use is nature-based and ecologically sustainable.

Managing multiple-use marine parks involves providing refuge areas for species and ecosystems while allowing for continuing recreational and commercial use of the majority of the marine environment.

A Master Plan for Queensland's Park System outlines the directions for management of all protected areas in Queensland for the next 20 years.

QPWS is responsible for day-to-day management of Queensland’s five World Heritage areas, which are (mostly) within the protected area estate. These properties are examples of the world's natural or cultural heritage, and provide environmental, tourism, and economic services for Queensland.

For each park, either a management statement or a management plan is prepared to identify the park's special values and determine ways to ensure those values are preserved, enhanced or maintained.

The service employs park rangers who are responsible for constructing and maintaining infrastructure such as camping areas, picnic areas, amenities, walking tracks and lookouts providing advice to visitors, recording wildlife data, controlling feral plants and animals, assisting in the preparation of management plans and enforcing park rules.

QPWS also works closely with Aboriginal Traditional Owners and, in some places, volunteers, as well as other government departments and organisations to conserve, manage, share and present Queensland’s most precious natural and cultural places.

In addition to its ranger capability, the QPWS also provides a firefighting service, QPWS Fire Management, that operates within National Parks, State Parks and Conservation parks, among others. QPWS Fire Management conducts both hazard reduction burns alongside responding to other fires within its area.

== Uniform ==
Rangers wear either khaki long or short sleeved shirts with dark trousers or shorts and boots. Rangers are also permitted to wear a QPWS branded baseball cap, QPWS branded giggle hat, or QPWS branded broad brimmed hat. Both shirts feature the QPWS logo on both shoulders.

Rangers engaging in firefighting duties wear green bunker gear with "PARKS" written across the upper back, along with the QPWS logo screen-printed on the upper left chest pocket.

== Vehicles ==
QPWS operate primarily the Toyota Land Cruiser 79 Series and Mercedes-Benz G-Class light attack appliances. QPWS also has a small amount of medium and heavy attack appliances based on an Isuzu or Hino chassis, such as the Isuzu Forward and Hino 500. All vehicles operated by the QPWS feature the words "RANGER", the Queensland Government logo and QPWS logo, along with a large amount of green and yellow battenburg markings. Fire Management vehicles can be identified by the presence of firefighting equipment and the addition of "FIRE" below the regular logos and "RANGER" text.

QPWS vehicles are also fitted with either green and amber, or magenta emergency lighting.

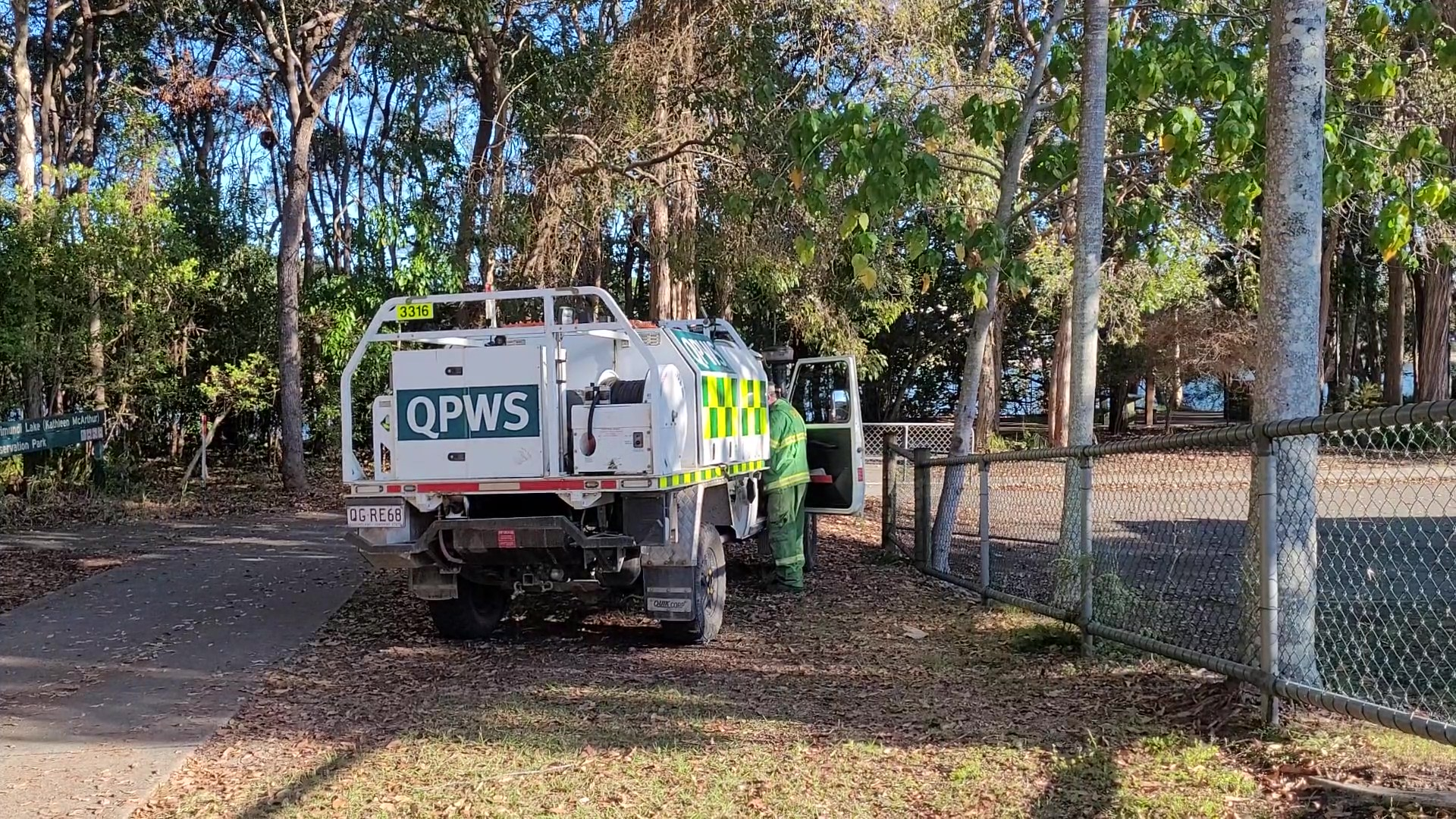
The rear of a QPWS Fire Management Mercedes G-Class

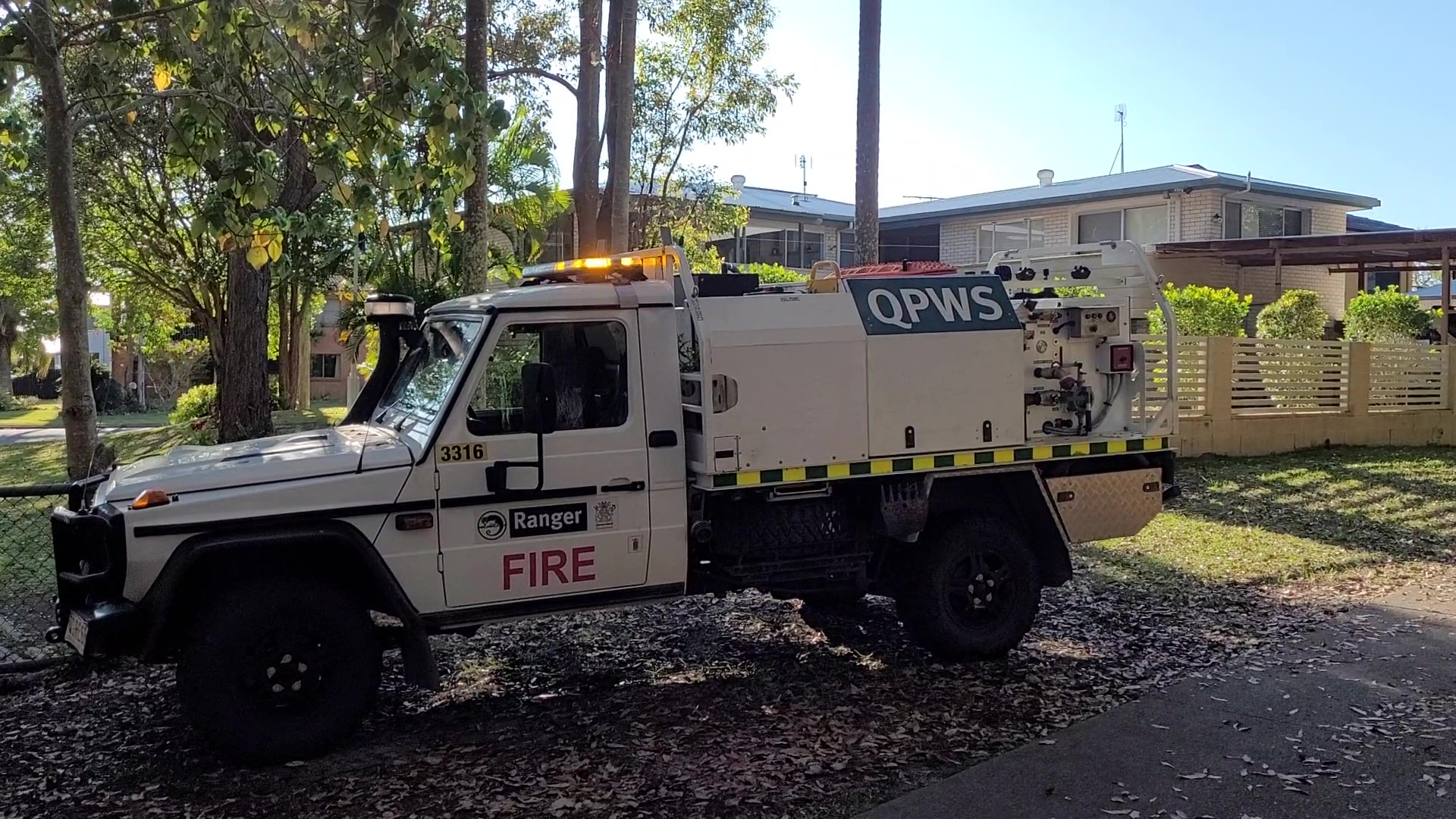
The side of a QPWS Fire Management Mercedes G-Class

== See also ==
- Protected areas of Queensland
- Wildlife Preservation Society of Queensland
- NSW National Parks & Wildlife Service
- Parks Victoria
- Tasmania Parks and Wildlife Service
- National Parks and Wildlife Service South Australia
- Department of Biodiversity, Conservation and Attractions
- Parks and Wildlife Commission of the Northern Territory
