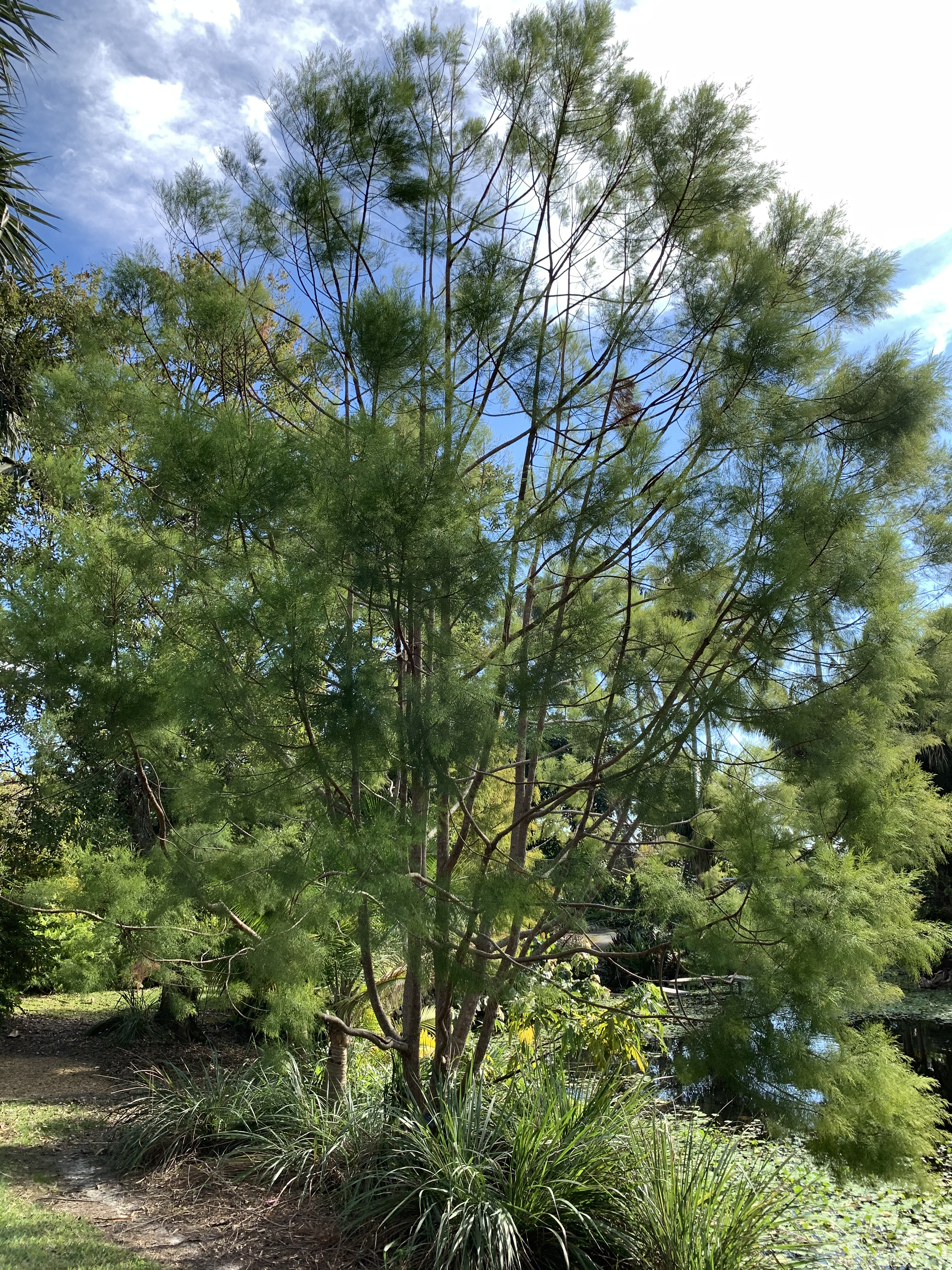

Conservation status
- Least Concern (IUCN 3.1)

Scientific classification
- Kingdom: Plantae
- Clade: Tracheophytes
- Clade: Angiosperms
- Clade: Eudicots
- Clade: Rosids
- Order: Fagales
- Family: Casuarinaceae
- Genus: Gymnostoma
- Species: G. sumatranum

Binomial name
- Gymnostoma sumatranum (Jungh. ex de Vriese) L.A.S.Johnson

Synonyms
- Casuarina sumatrana Jungh. ex de Vriese

= Gymnostoma sumatranum =

Species of tree

Gymnostoma sumatranum is a tree in the she-oak family, Casuarinaceae, native to Southeast Asia and the Malesia region.

== Range and habitat ==
According to Plants of the World Online, Gymnostoma sumatranum is endemic to the island of Sumatra in Indonesia. The IUCN Red List indicates a wider range for the species, including Sumatra, Java, Peninsular Malaysia, Borneo, the Philippines, Sulawesi, Maluku, New Guinea, the Bismark Archipelago, and the Solomon Islands.

It grows in a range of habitats, including primary lowland, hill, and montane forests. It has been found on thin soil over limestone outcrops, in heath forests on poor sandy soils, and at the edges of river and swamp forests. It has also been found in Dacrydium–Tristania–Podocarpus forest and montane forests dominated by trees of the beech family (Fagaceae).

In Malaysia, G. sumatranum is known as Rhu Bukit — with bukit in Malaysian meaning "hill". The other common she-oak species in Malaysia is Casuarina equisetifolia known as Rhu laut - laut in Malaysian means "sea" and typically it grows along the seashore on sandy substrates. In Sarawak it is a protected species (5). G. sumatranum typically grows further inland. However, when occurring in coastal regions, it provides good indication that the soil is dry and out of the littoral and inundation zone since G. sumatranum will not normally tolerate sandy or boggy soil.

== Description ==
Gymnostoma sumatranum is characterised by its multiple rounded umbrella-shaped crowns, while Casuarina equisetifolia (the most well-known member of Casuarinaceae) is typified by its equisetoid appearance. The roots have nitrogen-fixing nodules.

The stems are angular or tetrahedral in cross section (2). Like the other members of the family Casuarinaceae, they are characterized by drooping equisetoid (meaning "to look like Equisetum") twigs, are evergreen, and monoecious or dioecious.

The foliage of this tropical angiosperm tree looks like that of gymnosperm pine trees which typically grow in temperate climates. The stomata are not restricted to sunken grooves (2).

The female inflorescences are borne terminally (2).
