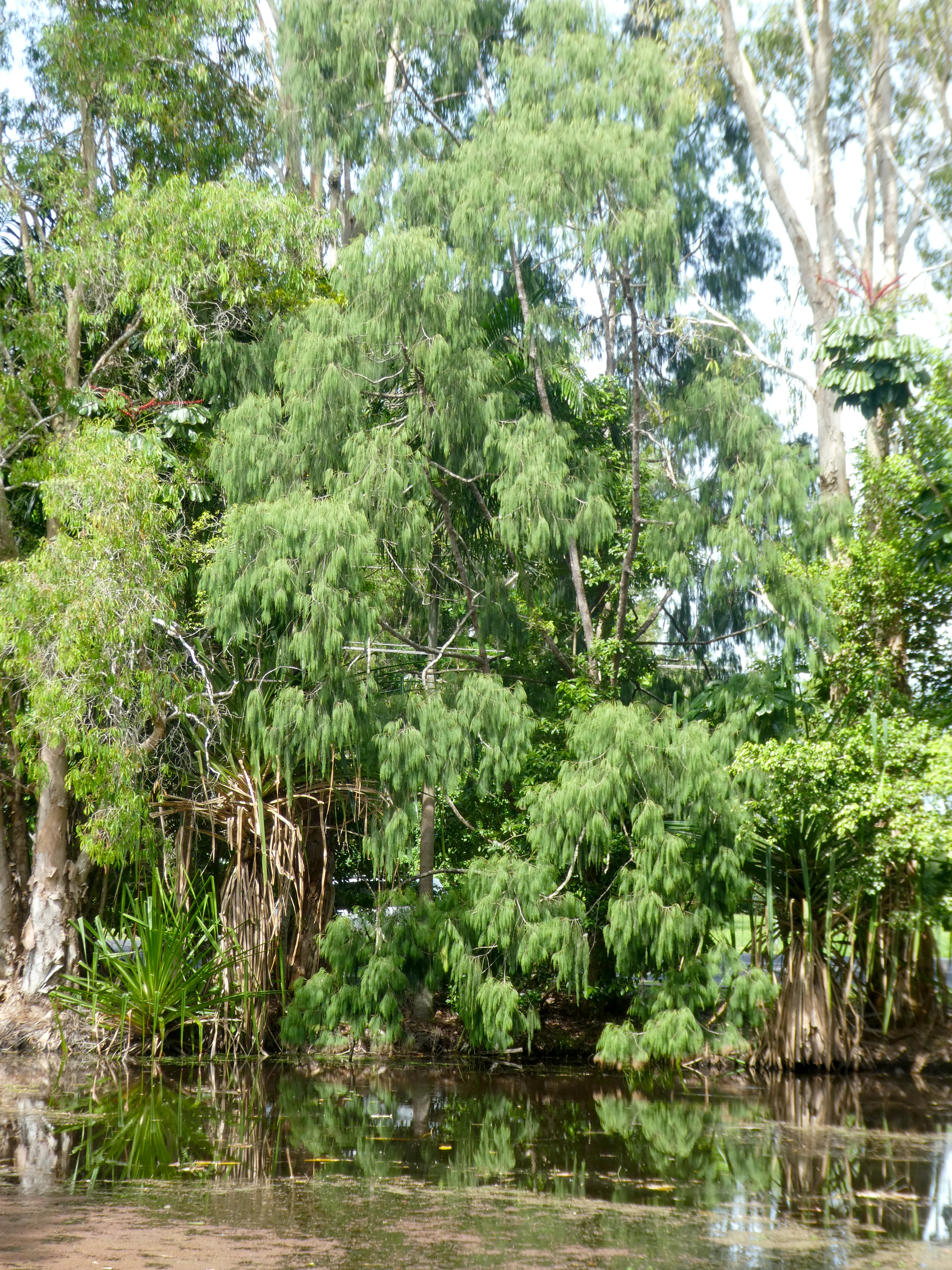
- Planted specimen at Cairns Botanic Gardens

Conservation status
- Least Concern (IUCN 3.1)

Scientific classification
- Kingdom: Plantae
- Clade: Tracheophytes
- Clade: Angiosperms
- Clade: Eudicots
- Clade: Rosids
- Order: Fagales
- Family: Casuarinaceae
- Genus: Gymnostoma
- Species: G. papuanum

Binomial name
- Gymnostoma papuanum (S.Moore) L.A.S.Johnson

Synonyms
- Casuarina papuana S.Moore

= Gymnostoma papuanum =

Species of flowering plant

Gymnostoma papuanum is a species of plants in the family Casuarinaceae endemic to New Guinea. It was first described in 1923 by English botanist Spencer Le Marchant Moore as Casuarina papuanum, and moved to the genus Gymnostoma in 1982 by Australian botanist Lawrence Alexander Sidney Johnson. In 2018 the International Union for Conservation of Nature assessed the species as Least Concern.
