= Thornton Peak =

Mountain in Queensland, Australia

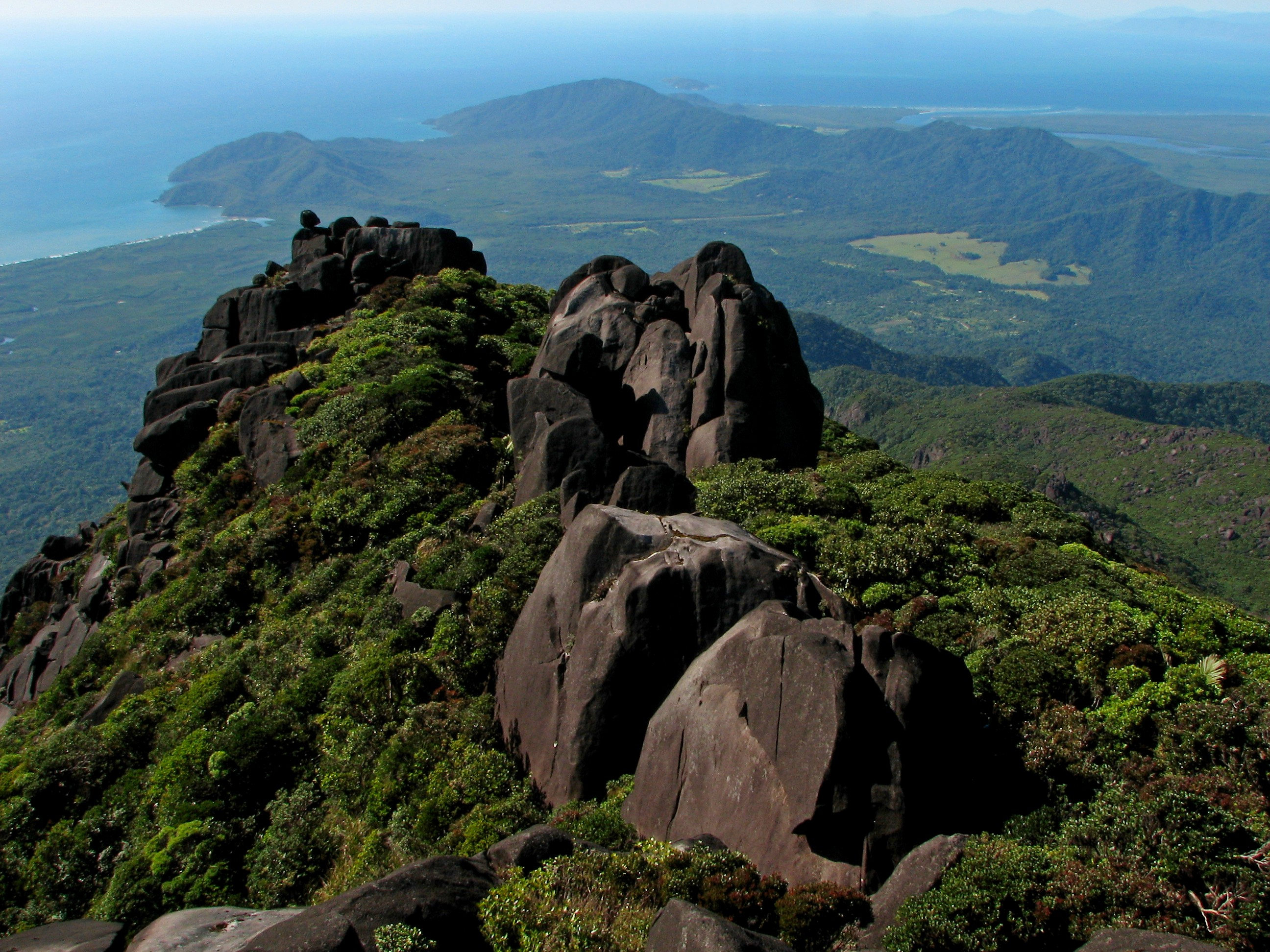
- Summit of Thornton Peak looking over Alexander and Cow Bay, Daintree National Park

Highest point
- Elevation: 1,374 m (4,508 ft)
- Coordinates: 16°09′51″S 145°22′27″E

Geography
- Location within Queensland
- Location: Queensland, Australia
- Parent range: Great Dividing Range

Climbing
- First ascent: Unknown

Thornton Peak is a prominent mountain that rises above the Daintree Rainforest to a height of 1374 m. The mountain is located about 126km northwest of Cairns within the catchment of the Daintree River.

It is Queensland's fourth highest peak after Mount Bartle Frere at 1,622 m (5,322 ft), Mount Bellenden Ker at 1,593 m (5,226 ft) and Mount Superbus at 1,375 m (4,511 ft).

The indigenous Eastern Kuku Yalanji people's name for Thornton Peak is Wundu, and it has spiritual significance for them.

The peak is covered by rainforest and is home to a number of endemic species. Thornton Peak is one of only three mountain tops that are home to the cinereus ringtail possum.

A group of scientists have suggested the mountain is a viable candidate for the translocation of some species which require a colder climate due to climate change.

In April 2001, a missing Aero Commander 500 was found on Thornton Peak.

== See also ==
- List of mountains in Australia
