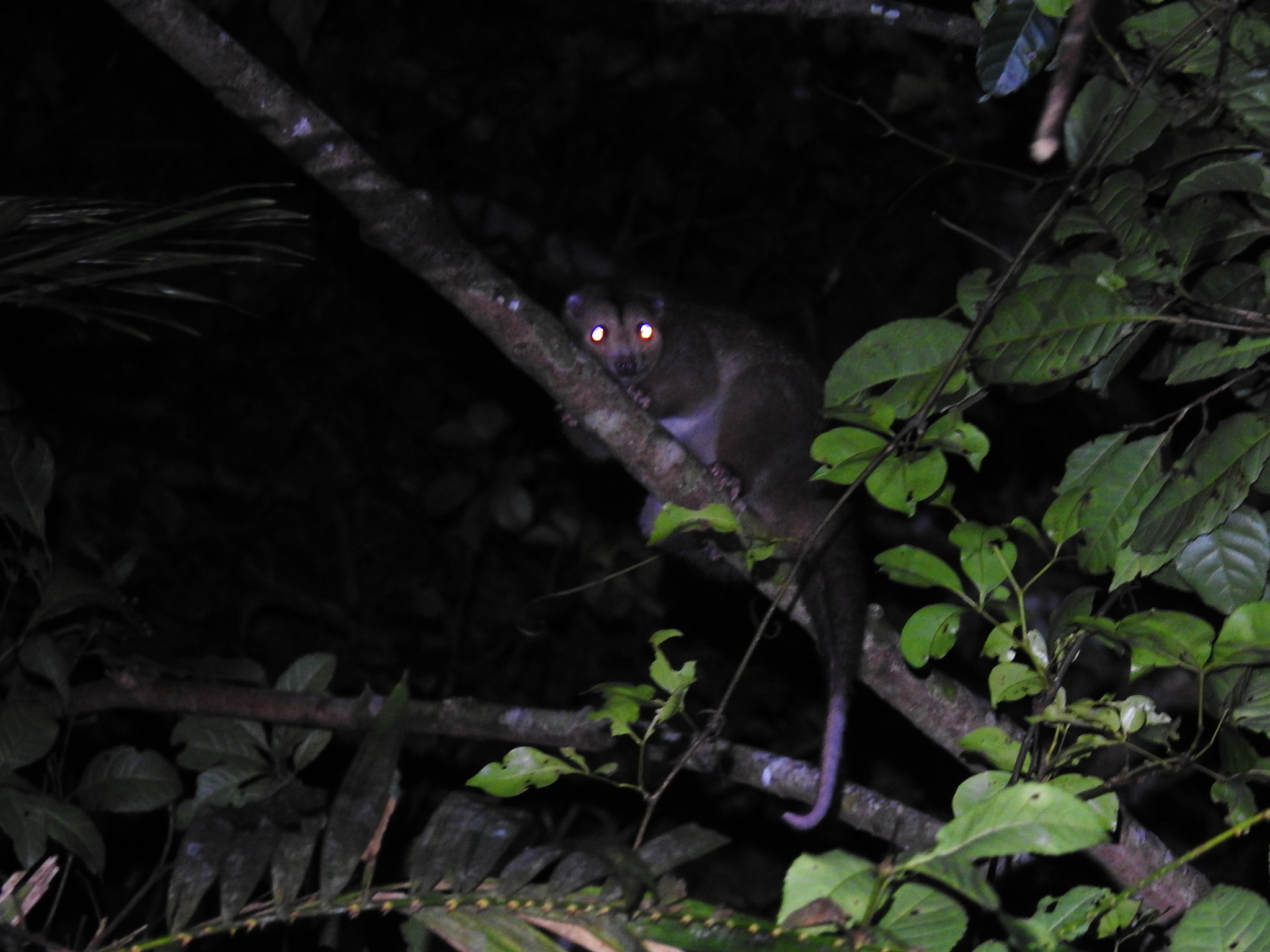

Conservation status
- Near Threatened (IUCN 3.1)

Scientific classification
- Kingdom: Animalia
- Phylum: Chordata
- Class: Mammalia
- Infraclass: Marsupialia
- Order: Diprotodontia
- Family: Pseudocheiridae
- Genus: Pseudochirulus
- Species: P. cinereus

Binomial name
- Pseudochirulus cinereus (Tate, 1945)
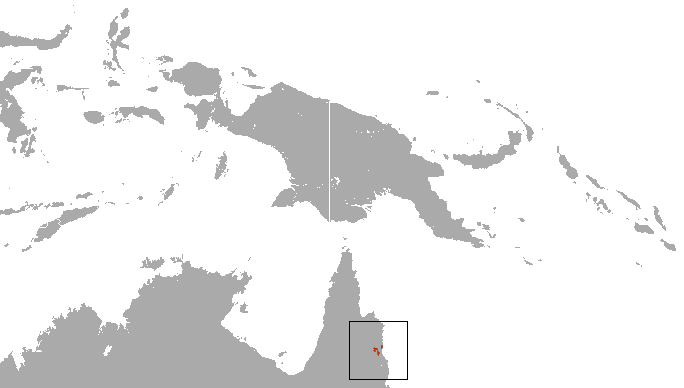
- Cinereus ringtail possum range

= Daintree River ringtail possum =

Species of marsupial

The Daintree River ringtail possum (Pseudochirulus cinereus), also known as the cinereus ringtail possum, is a species of possum found in northeastern Queensland, Australia. It was long believed to be the same as the Herbert River ringtail possum (P. herbertensis), but has recently been separated. The two species differ considerably in appearance.

The Daintree River ringtail possum is a cinnamon or brown colour, and has been said, like the lemuroid ringtail possum (Hemibelideus lemuroides), to resemble a lemur. It is found in montane tropical rainforest in three separate populations just north of Cairns: on Carbine Tableland, Mount Windsor Tableland and Thornton Peak massif.
