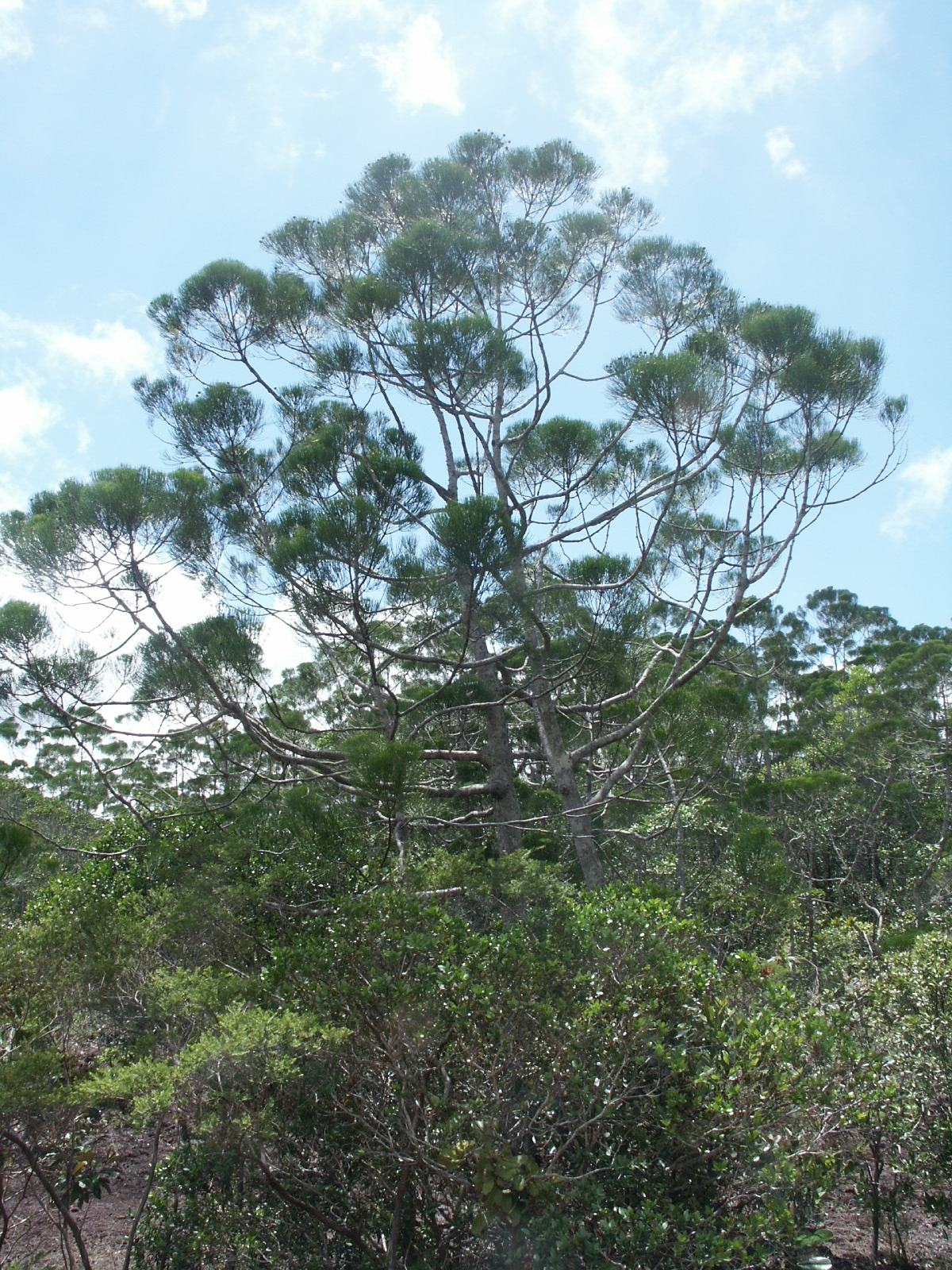
- Gymnostoma deplancheanum, very old specimen, near Prony, New Caledonia

Scientific classification
- Kingdom: Plantae
- Clade: Embryophytes
- Clade: Tracheophytes
- Clade: Spermatophytes
- Clade: Angiosperms
- Clade: Eudicots
- Clade: Rosids
- Order: Fagales
- Family: Casuarinaceae
- Genus: Gymnostoma; L.A.S.Johnson

Species
- See text

= Gymnostoma =

Genus of flowering plants

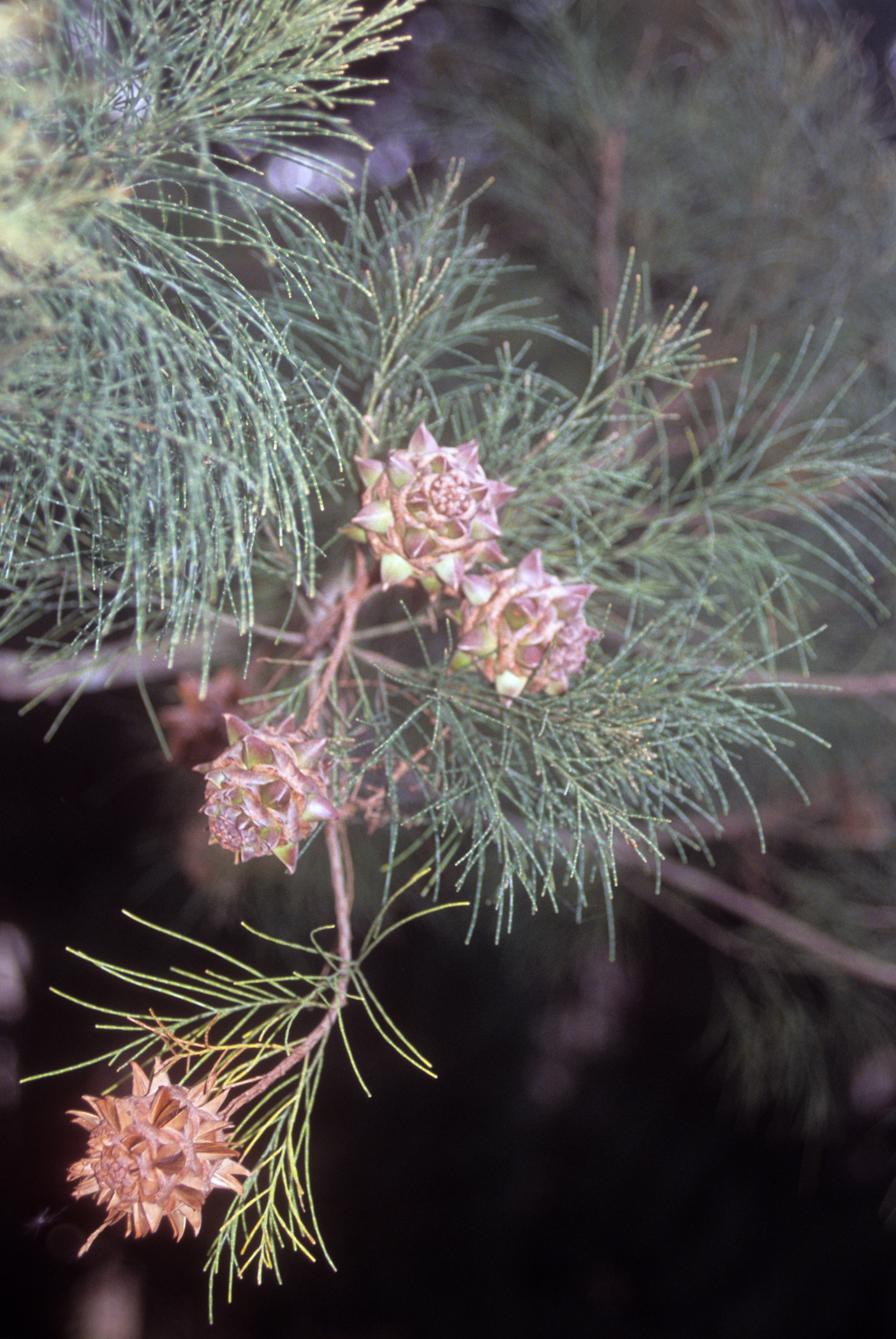
Gymnostoma poissonianum Cultivated, Forest Research Institute of Malaysia. Oct. 2002. Scott Zona from Miami, Florida, USA

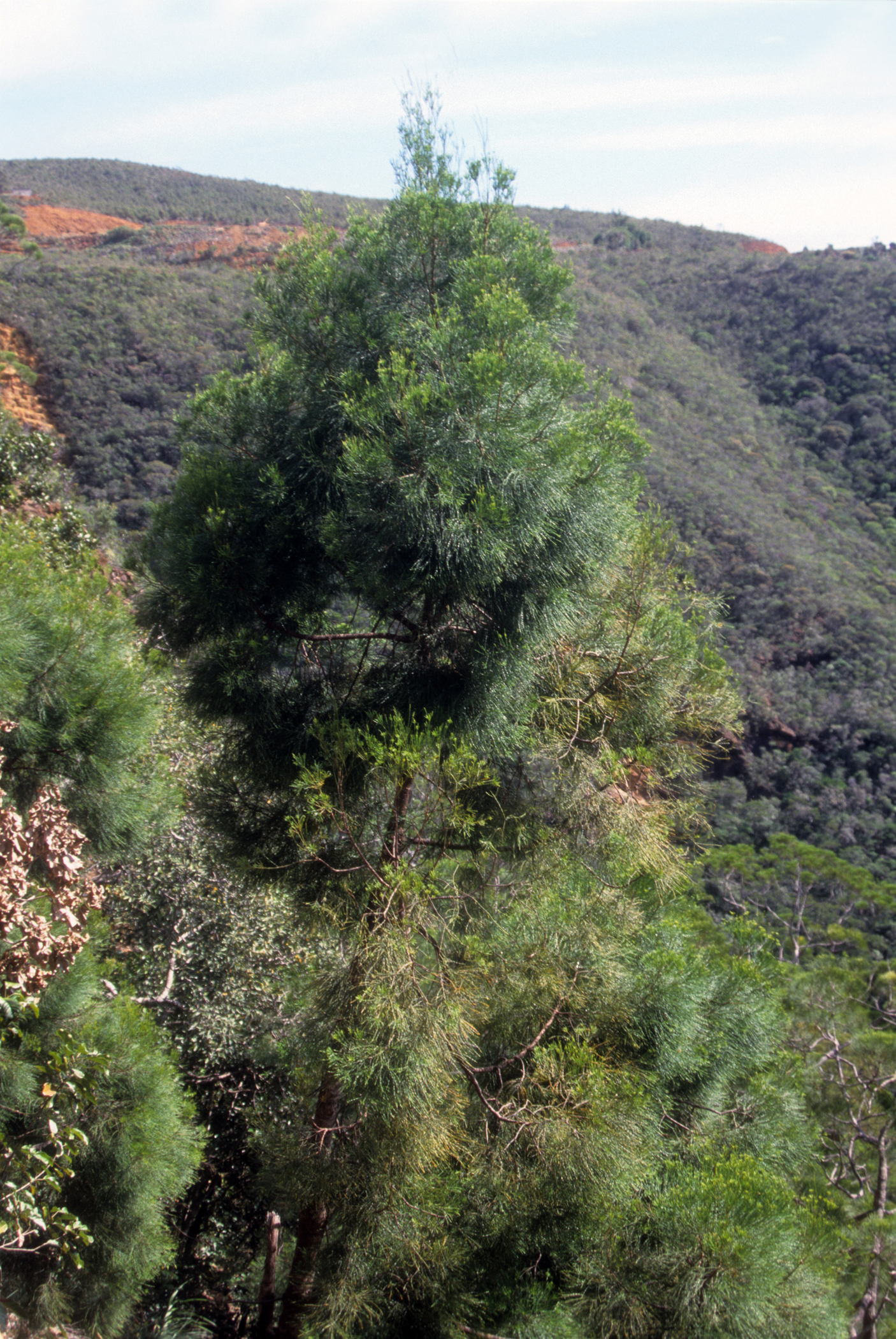
Gymnostoma poissonianum Mt. Dzumac, New Caledonia, Sep 2000. Scott Zona from Miami, Florida, USA

Gymnostoma is a genus of about eighteen species of trees and shrubs, constituting one of the four genera of the plant family Casuarinaceae. The species grow naturally in the tropics, including at high elevations having temperate climates, in forests in the region of the western Pacific Ocean and Malesia. In New Caledonia, published botanical science describes eight species found growing naturally, which botanists have not found anywhere else (endemics). Other species are native to Borneo, Sumatra, Maluku, and New Guinea, and one endemic species each in Fiji and the Wet Tropics of Queensland, Australia.

The genus was first scientifically described by Lawrie A. S. Johnson in 1980. Many of the Gymnostoma species combinations of names (binomials) were described by him in 1982. As of 2013, a global total of eighteen species have been found and described.

The majority of the species grow in rainforests, in the habitats of open, sunny, long-term gaps, from river bank (riparian) situations through to mountain top situations. In New Caledonia two endemic species G. chamaecyparis and G. deplancheanum have specialised adaptations, growing in wet "shrub maquis and paraforest maquis formations. G. chamaecyparis is associated with hypermagnesian soils (hypermagnesian inceptisol) below 600 m altitude at the base of ultramafic massifs. G. deplancheanum occurs on ferralitic ferritic desaturated hardpan or gravelly soils (oxisol) on the southern massif at altitudes between 200 and 1,000 m".

== Species ==
There are 14 formally described species:

- Gymnostoma australianum L.A.S.Johnson – Australia endemic
- Gymnostoma chamaecyparis (J.Poiss.) L.A.S.Johnson – New Caledonia endemic (Fr)
- Gymnostoma deplancheanum (Miq.) L.A.S.Johnson – New Caledonia endemic (Fr)
- Gymnostoma glaucescens (Schltr.) L.A.S.Johnson – New Caledonia endemic
- Gymnostoma intermedium (J.Poiss.) L.A.S.Johnson – New Caledonia endemic
- Gymnostoma leucodon (J.Poiss.) L.A.S.Johnson – New Caledonia endemic
- Gymnostoma nobile (Whitmore) L.A.S.Johnson – Borneo
- Gymnostoma nodiflorum (Thunb.) L.A.S.Johnson – New Caledonia endemic
- Gymnostoma papuanum (S.Moore) L.A.S.Johnson – New Guinea
- Gymnostoma poissonianum (Schltr.) L.A.S.Johnson – New Caledonia endemic
- Gymnostoma rumphianum (Miq.) L.A.S.Johnson – Maluku
- Gymnostoma sumatranum (Jungh. ex de Vriese) L.A.S.Johnson – Sumatra
- Gymnostoma vitiense L.A.S.Johnson – Fiji endemic
- Gymnostoma webbianum (Miq.) L.A.S.Johnson – New Caledonia endemic

There are approximately four additional species, found in New Guinea and collections preserved, that are awaiting formal description.
