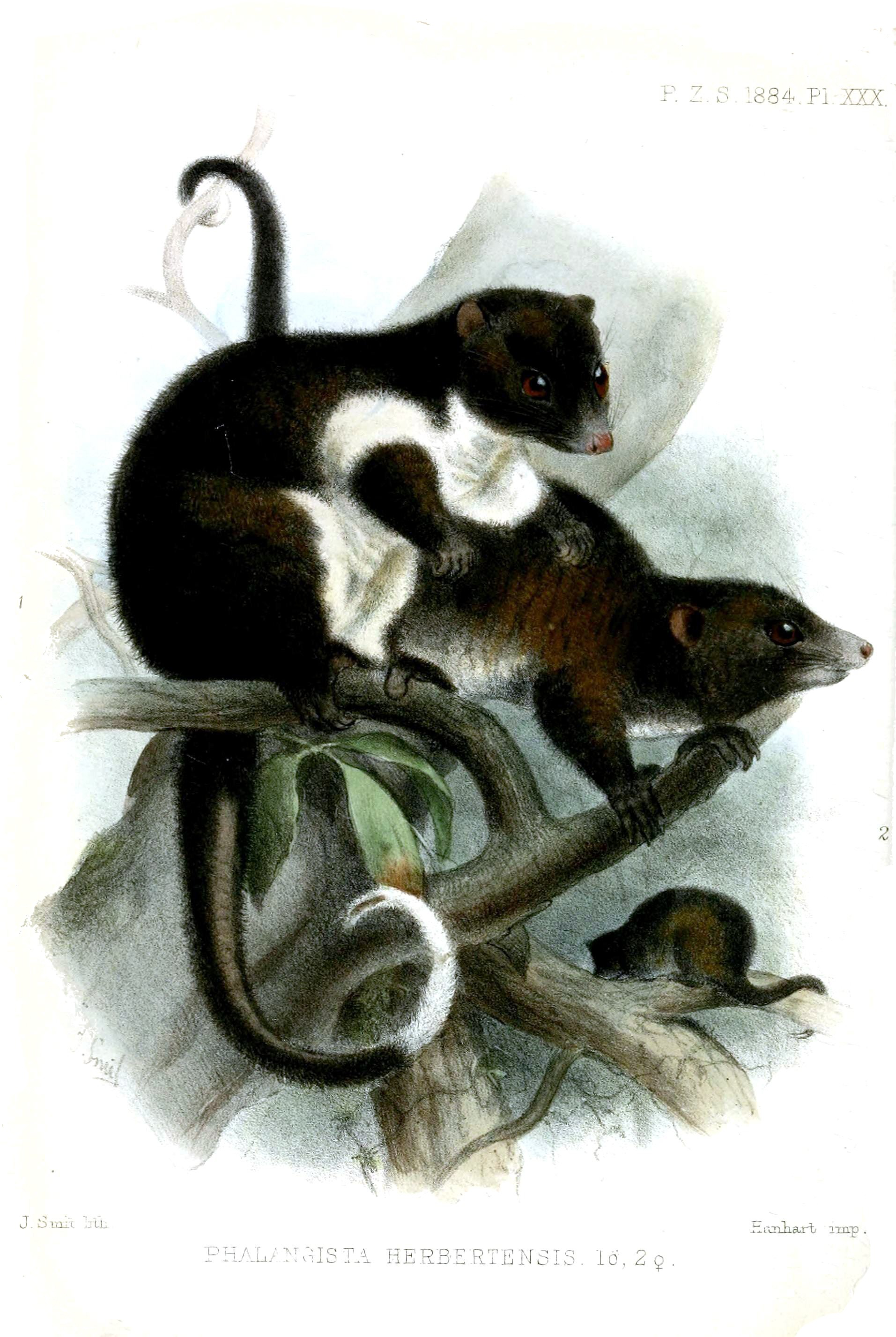

Conservation status
- Least Concern (IUCN 3.1)

Scientific classification
- Kingdom: Animalia
- Phylum: Chordata
- Class: Mammalia
- Infraclass: Marsupialia
- Order: Diprotodontia
- Family: Pseudocheiridae
- Genus: Pseudochirulus
- Species: P. herbertensis

Binomial name
- Pseudochirulus herbertensis (Collett, 1884)
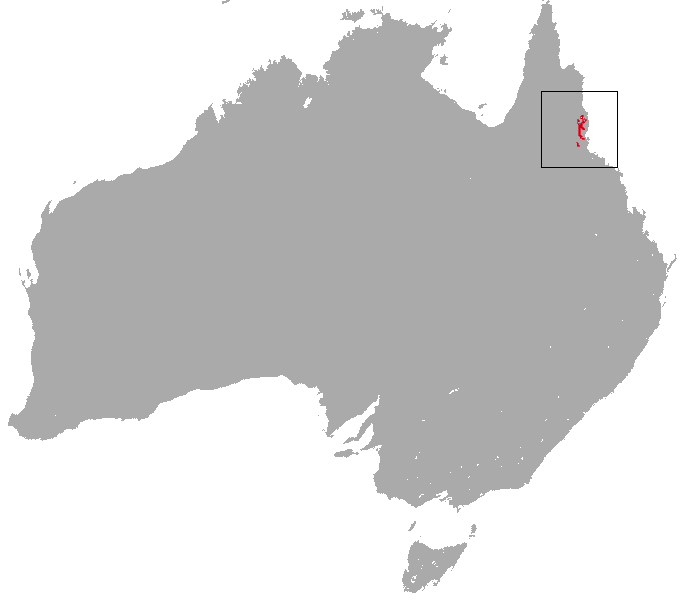
- Herbert River ringtail possum range

= Herbert River ringtail possum =

Species of marsupial

The Herbert River ringtail possum (Pseudochirulus herbertensis) is a species of possum found in northeastern Queensland, Australia. It is a dark brown to black species, sometimes with a white belly. The Herbert River ringtail possum was long considered conspecific with the cinereus ringtail possum (P. cinereus), despite the fact that they are very different in appearance. They are, however, the only members of their New Guinea-centred genus found in Australia. The Herbert River ringtail possum is restricted to tropical rainforest from Mount Lee, west of Ingham, to the Lamb Range, west of Cairns.

== Ecological problems ==
The Herbert River ringtail's diet mainly consists of leaves with high levels of protein. Some secondary food sources are pink bloodwood, cadaghi, bumpy satinash and white basswood. Pink bloodwood and cadaghi are two different types of Eucalyptus trees. Since the P. herbertensis diet consists of these Eucalyptus trees, ecologist John Kanowski of the Rainforest Cooperative Research Centre at Atherton believes P. herbertensis is one of "seven rare marsupials" threatened by global warming. Kanowski believes that both the Herbert River Ringtail Possum and Daintree River Ringtail Possum are at risk because the increased temperatures from global warming force them and other marsupials to retreat up the mountains, thus "reducing [their] area of favorable habitat." However, Kanowski is more worried about the increase in Carbon Dioxide (CO_{2}) levels. When CO_{2} levels increase, it leads to a change in the metabolic process of trees thus "chang[ing] the balance of protein in their leaves" and leading to an increase in production of tannins by the tree. This is problematic because "tannins can potentially inhibit the ability of leaf eating animals to digest protein; [and] at high concentrations, tannins are actually toxic." Therefore, while P. herbertensis may seem secure, their dependency on the rainforest "makes them vulnerable to habitat destruction."
