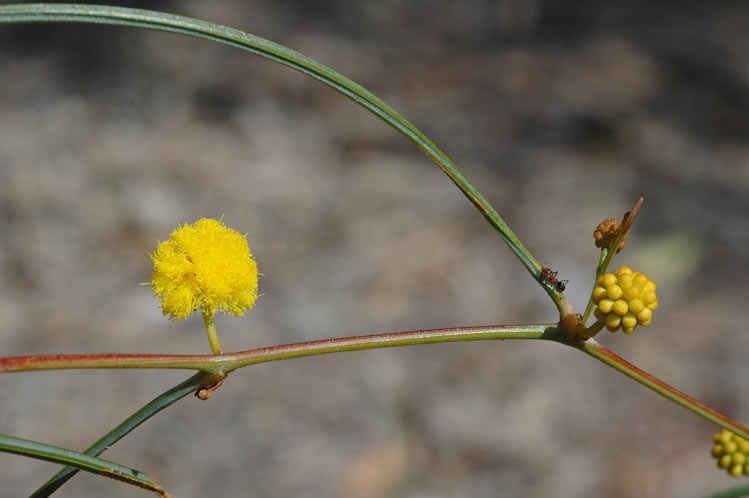
- In Kings Park, Western Australia

Conservation status
- Endangered (EPBC Act)

Scientific classification
- Kingdom: Plantae
- Clade: Embryophytes
- Clade: Tracheophytes
- Clade: Spermatophytes
- Clade: Angiosperms
- Clade: Eudicots
- Clade: Rosids
- Order: Fabales
- Family: Fabaceae
- Subfamily: Caesalpinioideae
- Clade: Mimosoid clade
- Genus: Acacia
- Species: A. sciophanes

Binomial name
- Acacia sciophanes Maslin
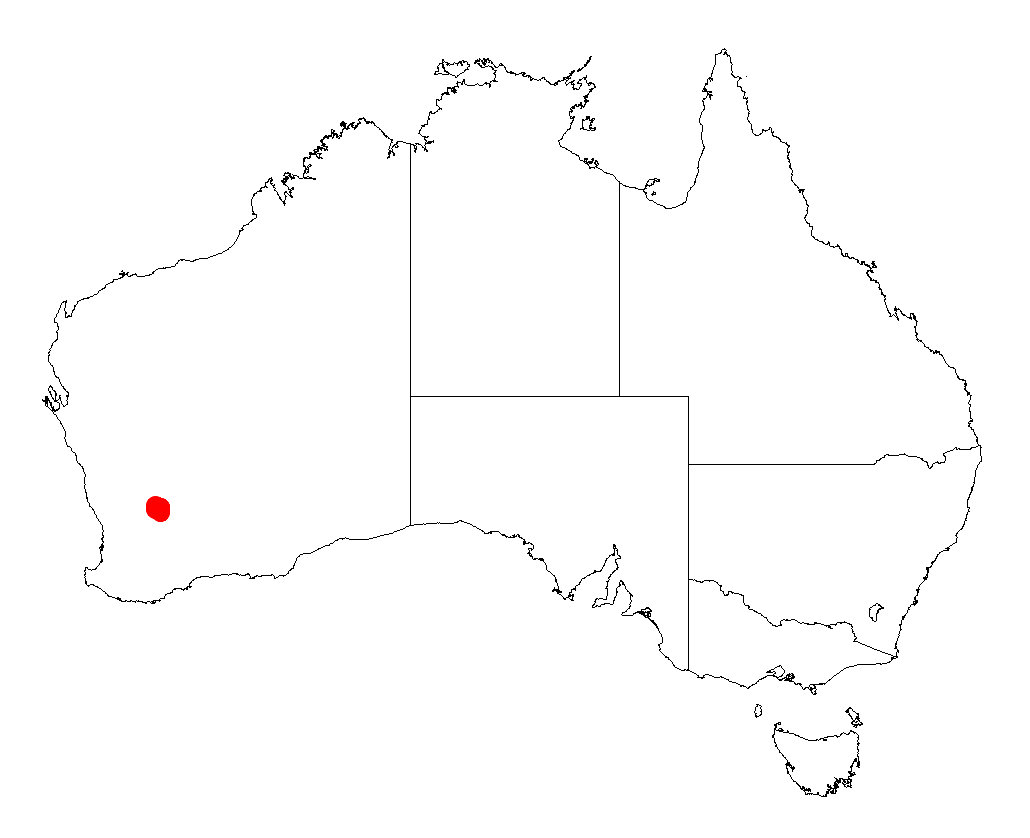
- Occurrence data from AVH

= Acacia sciophanes =

Ghost wattle

Species of legume

Acacia sciophanes, commonly known as the Ghost wattle or Wundowlin wattle, is a shrub of the genus Acacia and the subgenus Plurinerves that is endemic to a small area in south western Australia. In 1995 it was declared as rare in 1995 according to the Western Australian Wildlife Conservation Act 1950 and is listed as endangered under the Environment Protection and Biodiversity Conservation Act 1999.

== Description ==
The wispy shrub typically grows to a height of 1.5 to 3 metres (5 to 10 ft) with a diffuse and openly branched habit that divides near ground level, or up to a height of about 0.6 m (2 ft 0 in) into several of main trunks with zig-zagging and pundulous and resinous branches. Like most species of Acacia it has phyllodes rather than true leaves. The coarsely thread-like phyllodes have a length of 9 to 15 cm (3.5 to 5.9 in) and a width of about 2 mm (0.079 in) with four prominent ribs alternating with grooves and have with a hooked apex. It blooms from September to November and produces yellow flowers. The simple inflorescences occur singly or in pairs in the axils and have spherical flower-heads with a diameter of 7 to 8 mm (0.28 to 0.31 in) containing 25 to 31 sub-densely packed bright golden coloured flowers. The firmly chartaceous, hairy and cylindrical seed pods that form after flowering are linear but slightly raised over and constricted between each of the seeds. The pods are straight to slightly curved with a length up to 12 cm (4.7 in) and a diameter of about 2 mm (0.079 in) and contain glossy mottle light and dark tan coloured seeds with an oblong to elliptic shape with a length of 3 to 5 mm (0.12 to 0.20 in) and have a white aril.

== Taxonomy ==
The species was first formally described by the botanist Bruce Maslin as a part of the work Studies in the genus Acacia (Mimosaceae) - Miscellany as published in the journal Nuytsia. It was reclassified in 2003 by Leslie Pedley as Racosperma sciophanes then transferred back to genus Acacia in 2005. It is closely related to Acacia anfractuosa and resembles Acacia merinthophora.

== Distribution ==
It is native to a small area in the Wheatbelt region of Western Australia. The range of the plant is confined to an area of less than 10 km^{2} (3.9 sq mi) in the Shire of Mukinbudin about 18 km (11 mi) south west of the town of Mukinbudin, between the town and Bencubbin where the population is severely fragmented and with and a continuing decline in the number of mature individual. It grows in gravelly sandy that overlies laterite as a part of shrubland communities dominated by Acacia neurophylla, Acacia merrickiae, Allocasuarina corniculata Allocasuarina campestris and with hummock grassland species. The species is represented by two main populations or seven subpopulations with a total of 484 separate plants.

== See also ==
- List of Acacia species
