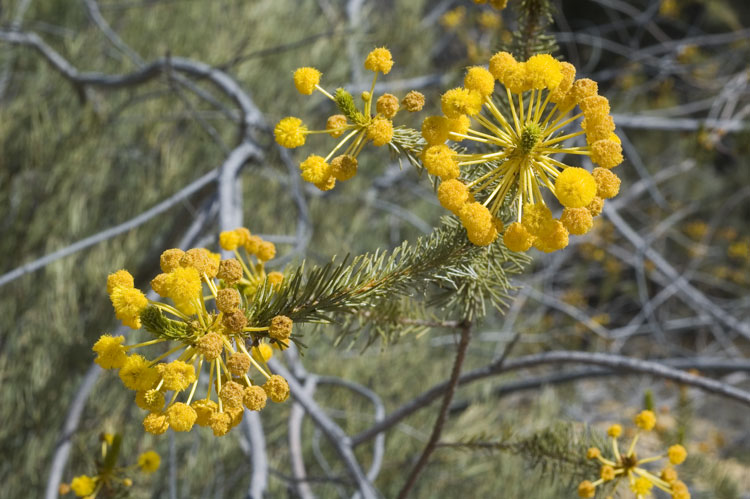

Scientific classification
- Kingdom: Plantae
- Clade: Embryophytes
- Clade: Tracheophytes
- Clade: Spermatophytes
- Clade: Angiosperms
- Clade: Eudicots
- Clade: Rosids
- Order: Fabales
- Family: Fabaceae
- Subfamily: Caesalpinioideae
- Clade: Mimosoid clade
- Genus: Acacia
- Species: A. rossei

Binomial name
- Acacia rossei F.Muell.
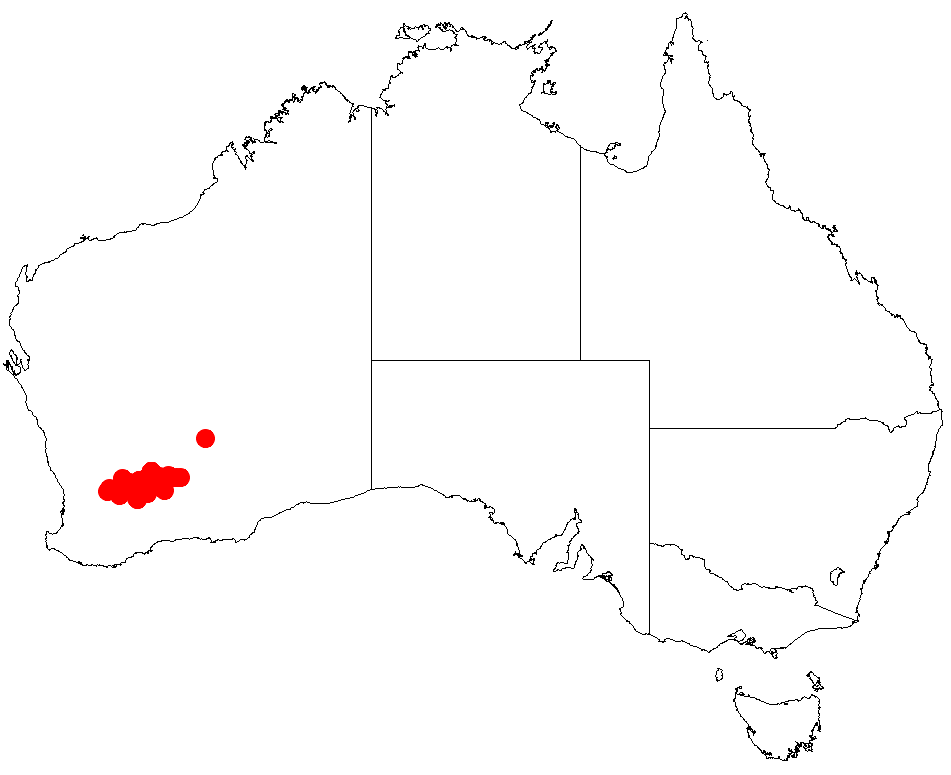
- Occurrence data from AVH

= Acacia rossei =

Yellowdine wattle

Species of legume

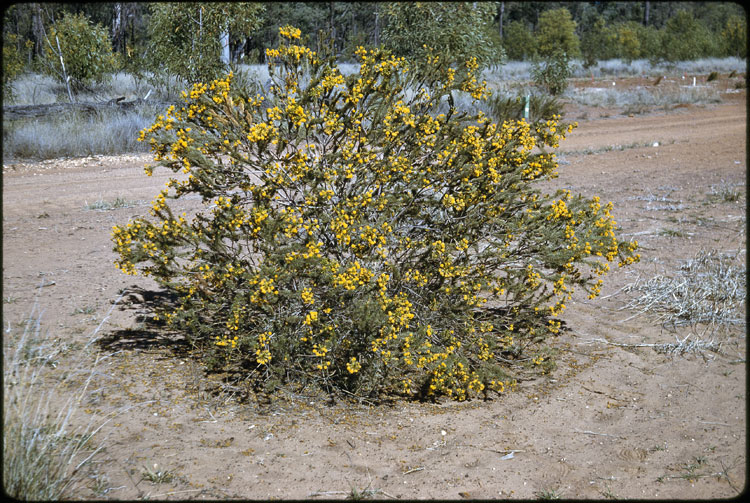
Habit in Myall Park Botanic Garden, Queensland

Acacia rossei, also known as Yellowdine wattle, is a shrub of the genus Acacia and the subgenus Phyllodineae that is endemic to south western Australia.

== Description ==
The spindly, open and viscid shrub typically grows to a height of 1.0 to 3.0 metres (3 to 10 ft). It is sparingly branched with glabrous branchlets that become roughened by stem-projections the once held the phyllodes in place and setaceous stipules with a length of 2.4 to 4.5 mm (0.094 to 0.177 in) in length.. Like most species of Acacia it has phyllodes rather than true leaves. The tick and evergreen phyllodes are crowded on the branchlets and are patent to erect. The phyllodes have a linear shape and are straight to shallowly curved with a length of 1 to 3 cm (0.39 to 1.18 in) and a width of 1 to 1.5 mm (0.039 to 0.059 in) with a resinous midrib and abaxial nerves. It blooms from August to January and produces yellow flowers. The inflorescence are composed of spherical flowerheads that are densely pack with 65 to 75 golden coloured flowers. The crustaceous seed pods that form after flowering have a narrowly oblong shape with a length of 2.5 to 5 cm (0.98 to 1.97 in) and a width of 7 to 11 mm (0.28 to 0.43 in) and are roughened by brown excrescences. The oblong to widely elliptic seeds inside have a length of 4 to 5 mm (0.16 to 0.20 in).

== Taxonomy ==
The species was first formally described by the botanist Ferdinand von Mueller in 1893 as part of the work Descriptions of new Australian plants, with occasional other annotations (continued) as published in The Victorian Naturalist. It was reclassified as Racosperma rossei by Leslie Pedley then transferred back to genus Acacia in 2006. It resembles and is thought to be closely related to Acacia glutinosissima and Acacia handonis found in Queensland has the same type of excrescences on the seed pod.

== Distribution ==
It is native to an area in the Wheatbelt and Goldfields-Esperance regions of Western Australia where it is commonly situated on sandplains growing in sandy lateritic soils. The range of the shrub extends from around Kellerberrin in the west to around Hyden in the south and Yellowdine in the east and is commonly found in disturbed areas like road verges and will regenerate after bushfires, it is usually a part of tall shrubland communities.

== Cultivation ==
The shrub is sold commercially and is known for the showy flower display. It prefers an open position in full sun in a light well drained soil and is moderately frost tolerant and drought resistant.

== See also ==
- List of Acacia species
