= Acacia anfractuosa =

Conservation status
- Least Concern (IUCN 3.1)

Scientific classification
- Kingdom: Plantae
- Clade: Tracheophytes
- Clade: Angiosperms
- Clade: Eudicots
- Clade: Rosids
- Order: Fabales
- Family: Fabaceae
- Subfamily: Caesalpinioideae
- Clade: Mimosoid clade
- Genus: Acacia
- Species: A. anfractuosa

Binomial name
- Acacia anfractuosa Maslin
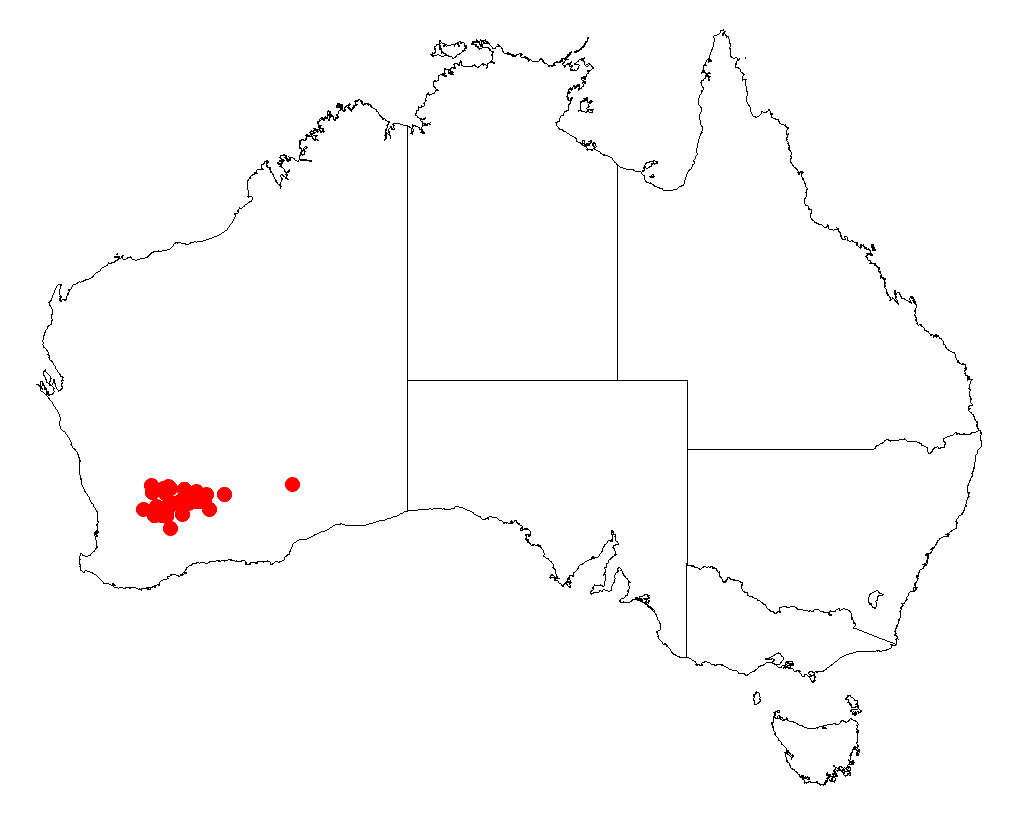
- Occurrence data from AVH

Synonyms
- Racosperma anfractuosum (Maslin) Pedley

Species of legume

Habit in the Wattle Garden in Kings Park

Acacia anfractuosa is a species of flowering plant in the family Fabaceae and is endemic to the southwest of Western Australia. It is a diffuse, spindly, weeping shrub or tree with widely spreading, linear or s-shaped phyllodes, spherical heads of 22 to 32 golden-yellow flowers, and linear pods up to 120 mm (4.7 in) long.

== Description ==
Acacia anfractuosa is a diffuse, spindly, weeping shrub or tree that typically grows to a height of 1.3–4.5 m (4 ft 3 in – 14 ft 9 in), its new shoots resinous. The phyllodes are widely spreading, linear or s-shaped, diamond-shaped to flat in cross-section, green to greyish-green with down-curved edges, mostly 80–170 mm (3.1–6.7 in) long and 1–2 mm (0.039–0.079 in) wide. The central vein and edge veins are yellowish. The flowers are borne in one or two spherical heads in axils on a peduncle 4–11 mm (0.16–0.43 in) long, each head 7–12 mm (0.28–0.47 in) long and 6–8 mm (0.24–0.31 in) in diameter, with 22 to 32 golden-yellow flowers. Flowering occurs from July to December and the fruit is a firmly papery pod up to 120 mm (4.7 in) long and 1.5–5.0 mm (0.059–0.197 in) wide and slightly constricted between the seeds. The seeds are linear to elliptic, glossy mottled brown, 4.5–5.0 mm (0.18–0.20 in) long with a white aril.

== Taxonomy ==
Acacia anfractuosa was first formally described in 1976 by the botanist Bruce Maslin in the journal Nuytsia from specimens he collected 26 km (16 mi) east of Karalee Rock near Yellowdine in 1971. This species is quite closely related to Acacia sciophanes and also similar in appearance to Acacia heteroneura and Acacia merinthophora.

== Distribution and habitat ==
This acacia is found in yellow sand in sandplain heath and is found from Bruce Rock and east to Boorabbin and Coolgardie in the Avon Wheatbelt and Coolgardie bioregions in the south-west of Western Australia.

== See also ==
- List of Acacia species
