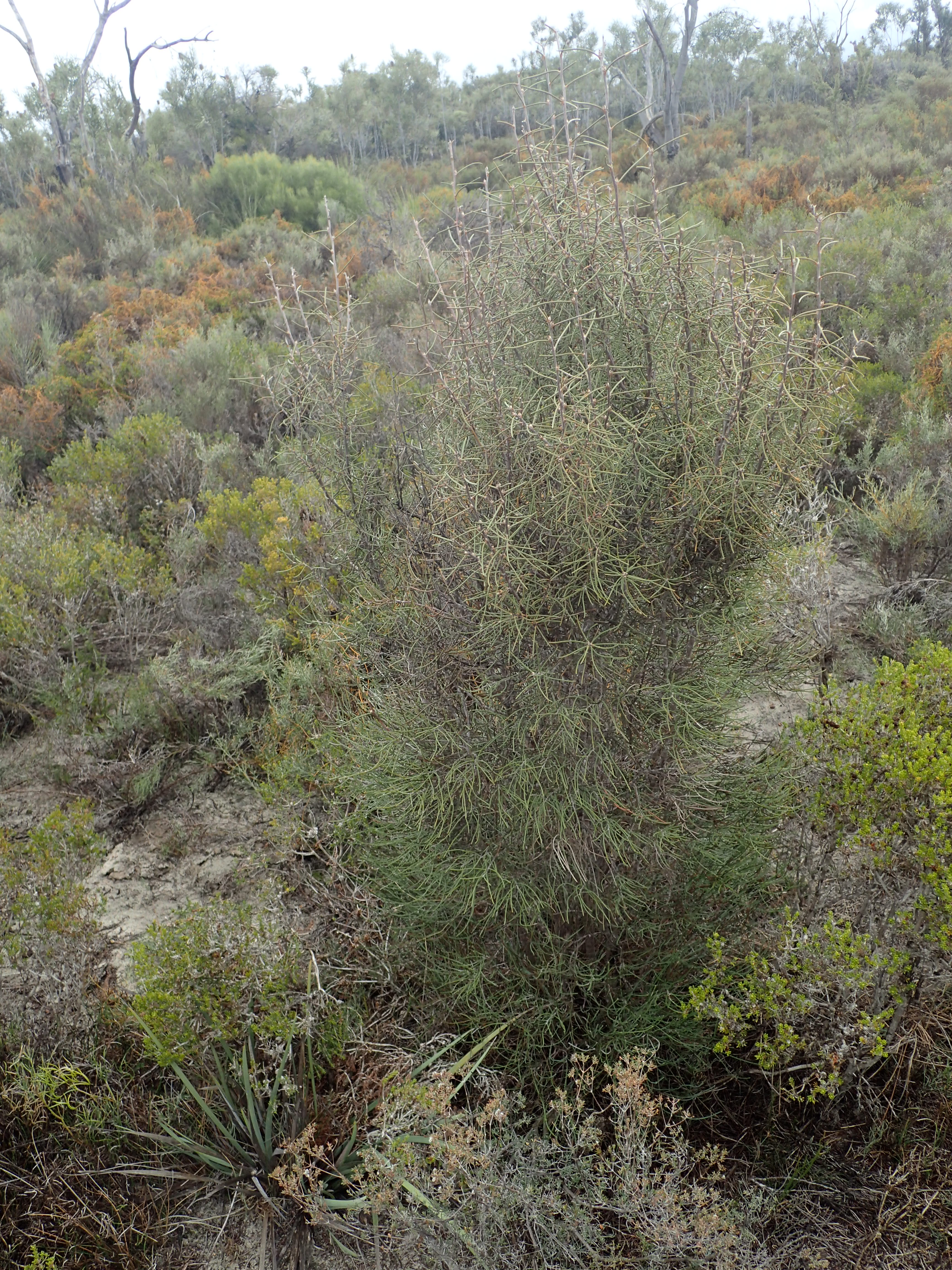
- Hakea sulcata in the Lake Wannamal Nature Reserve

Scientific classification
- Kingdom: Plantae
- Clade: Tracheophytes
- Clade: Angiosperms
- Clade: Eudicots
- Order: Proteales
- Family: Proteaceae
- Genus: Hakea
- Species: H. sulcata

Binomial name
- Hakea sulcata R.Br.
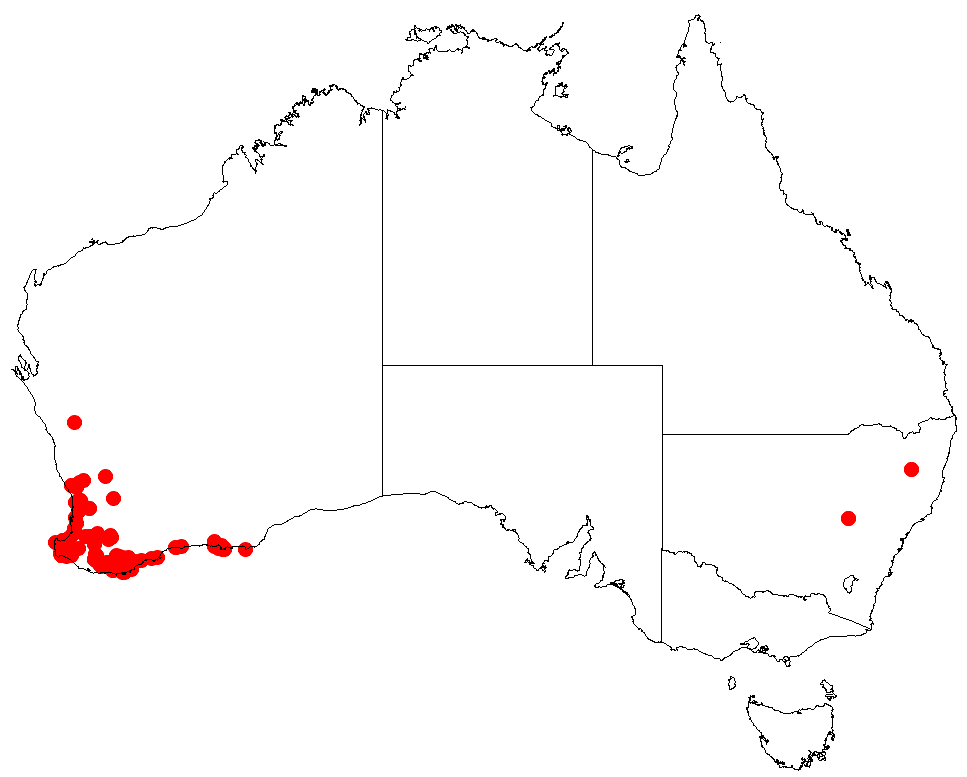
- Occurrence data from Australasian Virtual Herbarium

= Hakea sulcata =

Furrowed hakea

Species of plant endemic to Western Australia

Hakea sulcata, commonly known as furrowed hakea, is a flowering plant in the family Proteaceae and is endemic to Western Australia. It is a prickly shrub with grooved, cylindrical leaves, sweetly-scented flowers and relatively small fruit.

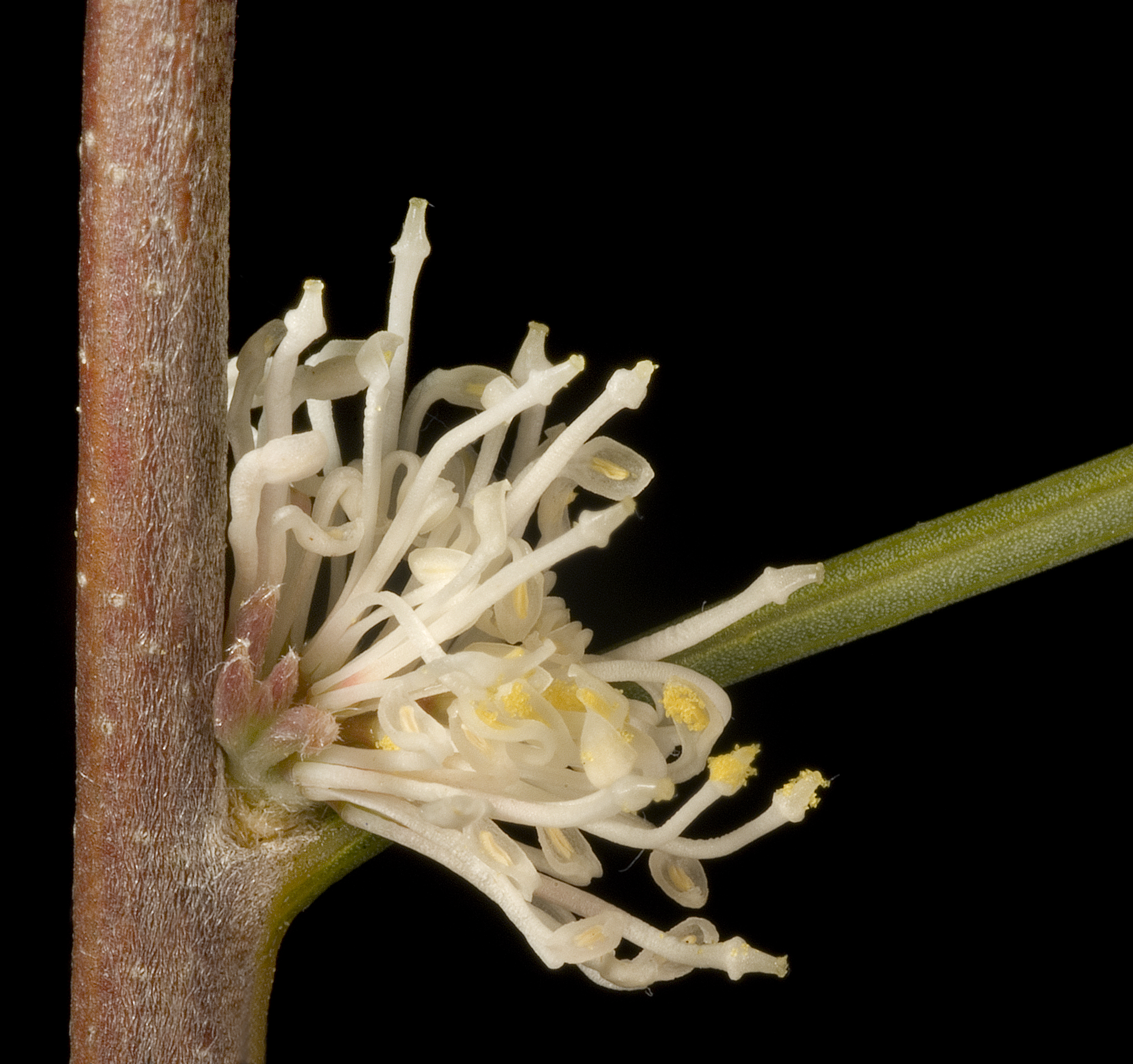
Flowers

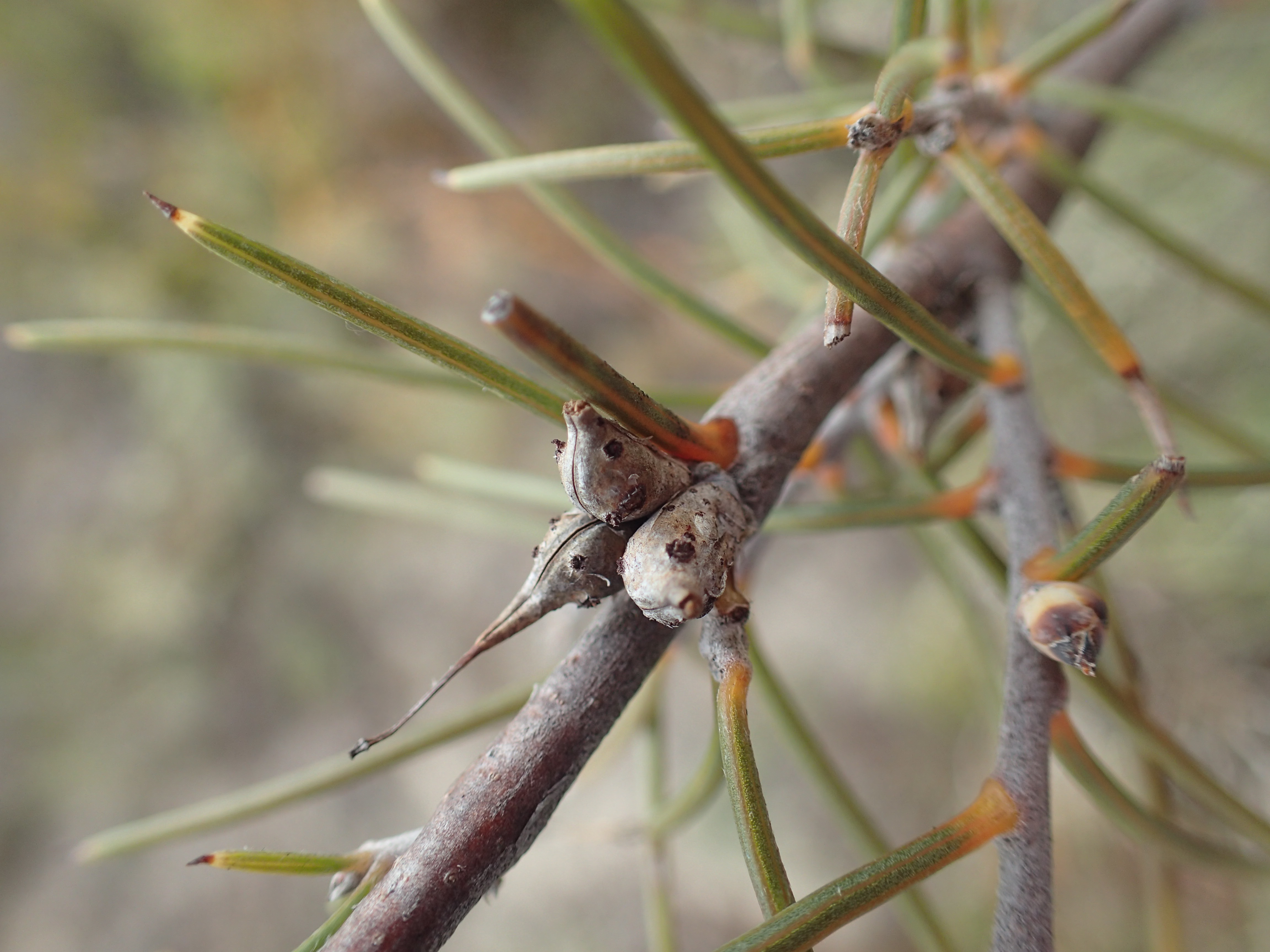
Fruit and grooved leaves

== Description ==
Hakea sulcata is a small spreading or upright shrub that grows to a height of 0.4 to 2 metres (1 to 7 ft) and does not form a lignotuber. The branchlets are either thickly or sparsely covered in flattened soft silky hairs at flowering time. The leaves are needle-shaped, thick, pentagonal in cross-section, more or less 2–12.5 cm (0.8–5 in) long and 1–2 mm (0.04–0.08 in) in diameter and grow alternately on the branchlets. The leaves have 6 or 7 shallow longitudinal grooves and end in a sharp point. The leaves occasionally vary in shape, they may be linear, narrowly egg-shaped, flat or concave with prominent veins. The inflorescence consists of 8–14 white, sweetly scented flowers is a single raceme in clusters in the leaf axils or on old wood. The cream-white pedicels are smooth, the perianth cream-white and the pistils 5–9.5 mm (0.20–0.37 in) long. The egg-shaped fruit are the smallest in the genus less than 0.6–0.8 cm (0.2–0.3 in) long and 0.3–0.35 cm (0.12–0.14 in) wide. The surface is generally smooth or slightly warty becoming rough with age and end in a point.

== Taxonomy and naming ==
Hakea sulcata was first formally described in 1810 by Robert Brown and the description was published in Transactions of the Linnean Society. Named from the Latin sulcatus - grooved, referring to the leaf structure.

== Distribution ==
Furrowed hakea is endemic to an area in the South West, Great Southern and the Goldfields–Esperance regions of Western Australia from Gingin in the north to Albany in the south, Augusta in the west and Esperance in the east. It grows in sandy or clay soils over or around areas of laterite.

== Conservation status ==
Hakea sulcata is classified as "not threatened" by the Western Australian Government Department of Parks and Wildlife.
