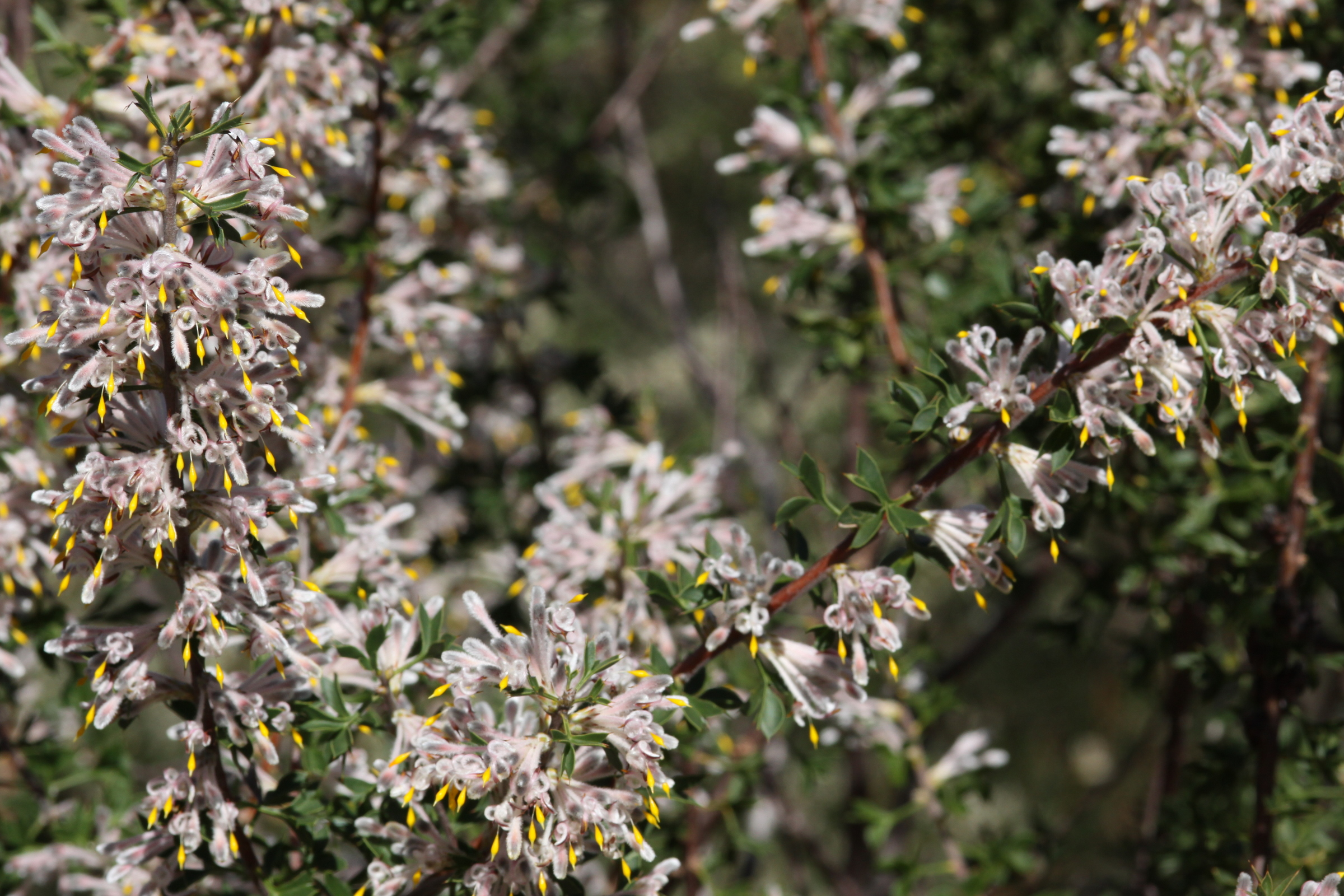
- In John Forrest National Park

Scientific classification
- Kingdom: Plantae
- Clade: Tracheophytes
- Clade: Angiosperms
- Clade: Eudicots
- Order: Proteales
- Family: Proteaceae
- Genus: Petrophile
- Species: P. biloba

Binomial name
- Petrophile biloba R.Br.

Synonyms
- Petrophila argyrotricha Gand.orth. var.; Petrophila biloba R.Br. orth. var.; Petrophila chrysotricha Gand. orth. var.; Petrophile argyrotricha Gand.; Petrophile chrysotricha Gand.

= Petrophile biloba =

Granite petrophile

Species of shrub endemic to Western Australia

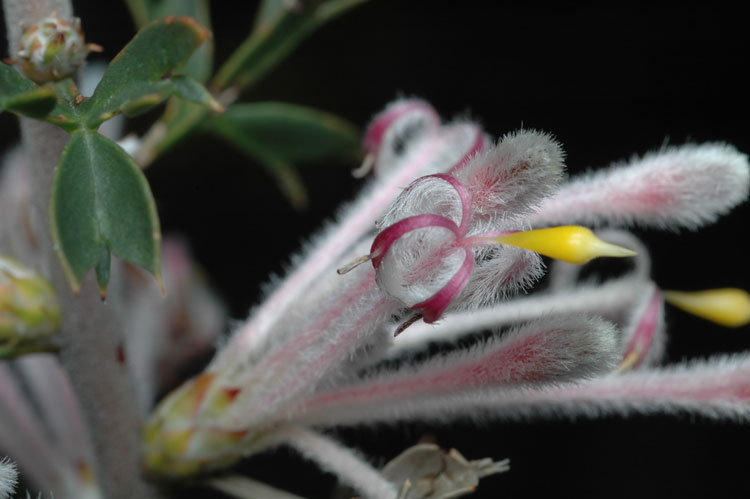
Flower detail

Petrophile biloba, commonly known as granite petrophile, is a species of flowering plant in the family Proteaceae and is endemic to the south-west of Western Australia. It is a shrub with pinnately-divided leaves with sharply-pointed tips, and oval heads of hairy, mostly grey to pink flowers.

== Description ==
Petrophile biloba is a shrub that typically grows to a height of 1–2 m (3 ft 3 in – 6 ft 7 in) and has hairy branchlets that become glabrous with age. The leaves are 15–20 mm (0.59–0.79 in) long on a petiole up to 20 mm (0.79 in) long, and pinnately-divided to the mid-rib with two or three lobes, each with a sharply-pointed tip. The flowers are arranged in leaf axils, in sessile, oval heads about 15 mm (0.59 in) long, sometimes in clusters, with a few deciduous involucral bracts at the base. The flowers are about 17–25 mm (0.67–0.98 in) long, mostly grey to pink and hairy. Flowering occurs from June to October and the fruit is a nut, fused with others in an oval head 10–14 mm (0.39–0.55 in) long.

== Taxonomy ==
Petrophile biloba was first formally described in 1830 by Robert Brown in the Supplementum to his Prodromus Florae Novae Hollandiae et Insulae Van Diemen from material collected by Charles Fraser near the Swan River in 1827. The specific epithet (biloba) referring to the lobed leaves.

== Distribution and habitat ==
This petrophile grows in heath over laterite from near the Canning River to near Wannamal in the Jarrah Forest and Swan Coastal Plain biogeographical regions of southwestern Western Australia.

== Conservation status ==
Petrophile biloba is classified as "not threatened" by the Western Australian Government Department of Parks and Wildlife.
