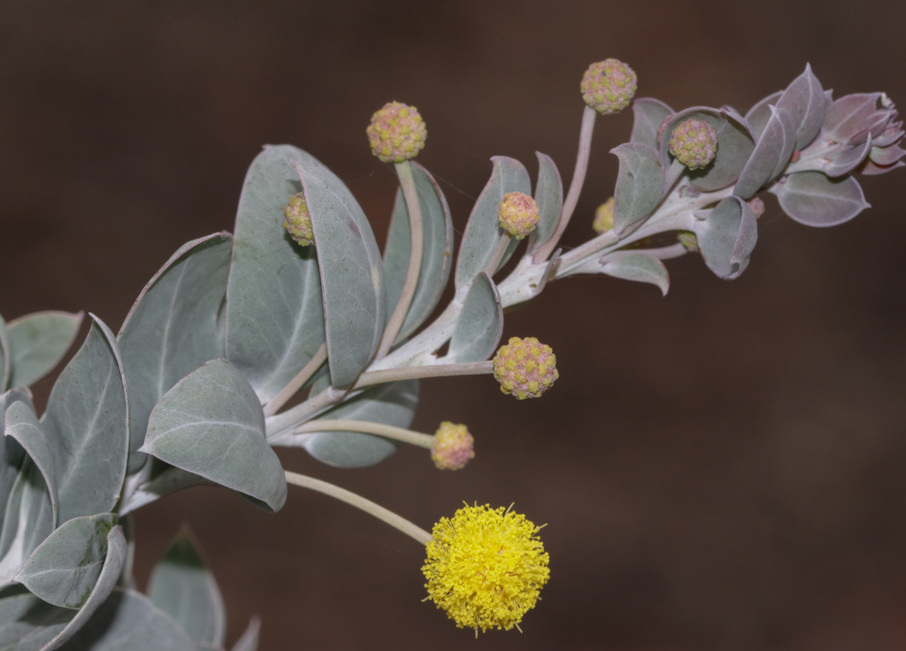
- Near Mukinbudin

Conservation status
- Priority Four — Rare Taxa (DEC)

Scientific classification
- Kingdom: Plantae
- Clade: Tracheophytes
- Clade: Angiosperms
- Clade: Eudicots
- Clade: Rosids
- Order: Fabales
- Family: Fabaceae
- Subfamily: Caesalpinioideae
- Clade: Mimosoid clade
- Genus: Acacia
- Species: A. merrickiae

Binomial name
- Acacia merrickiae Maiden & Blakely
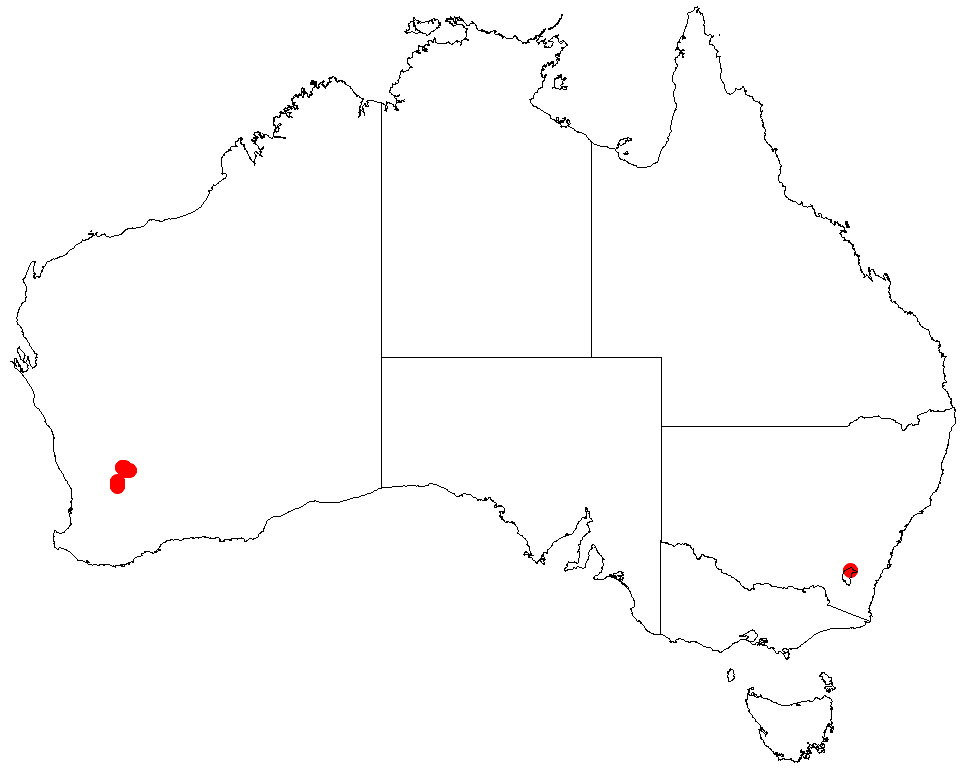
- Occurrence data from AVH

Synonyms
- Acacia merrickae Maiden & Blakely orth. var.; Racosperma merrickiae (Maiden & Blakely) Pedley

= Acacia merrickiae =

Species of legume

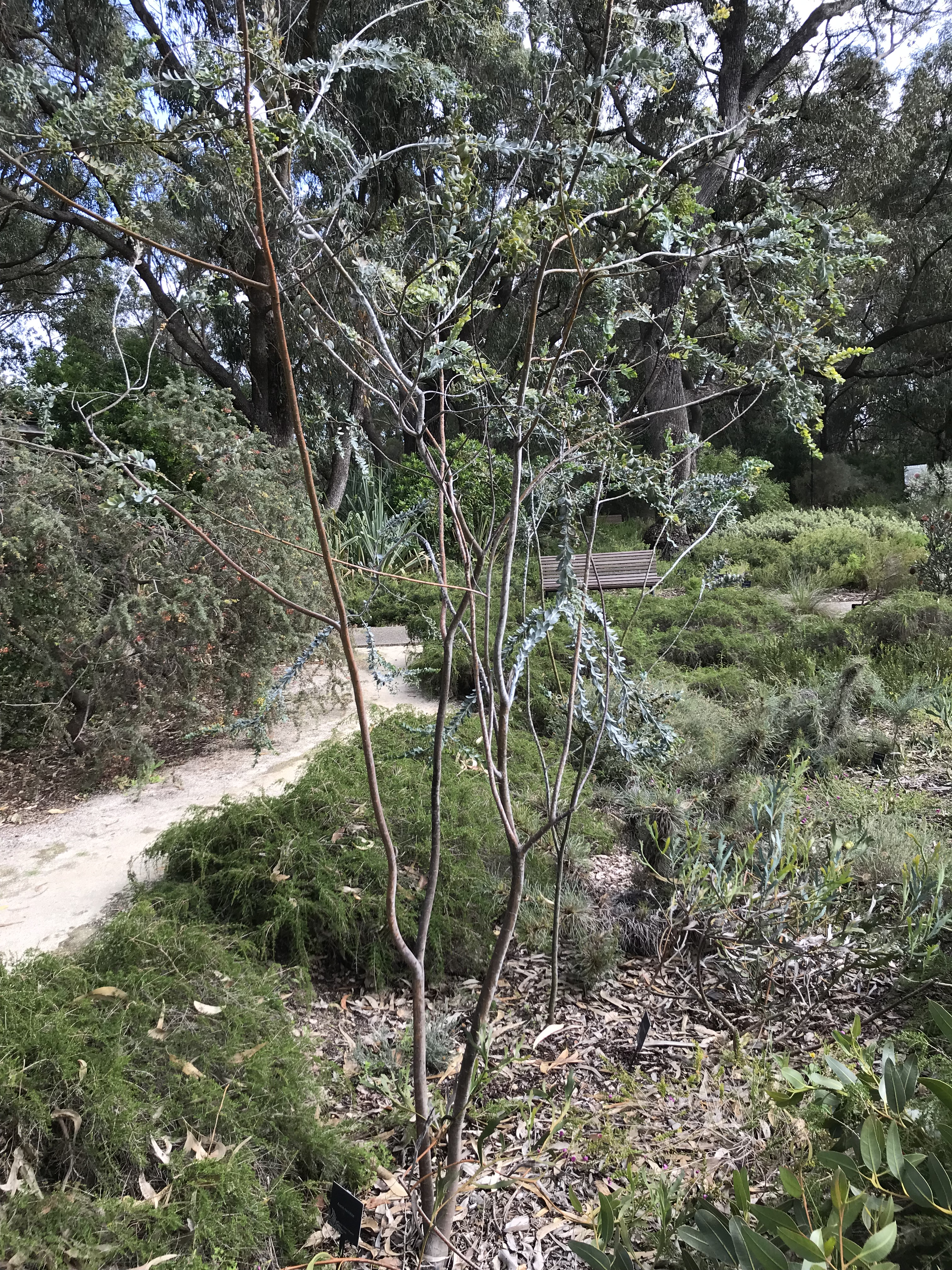
Habit in Kings Park

Acacia merrickiae, commonly known as Merrick's wattle, is a species of flowering plant in the family Fabaceae and is endemic to a restricted area in the south-west of Western Australia. It is a spindly, open, glabrous, commonly single-stemmed shrub with branchlets covered by a powdery bloom, elliptic to egg-shaped, leathery phyllodes, spherical to slightly oblong heads of light golden yellow flowers, and linear pods rounded over and more or less slightly constricted between the seeds.

== Description ==
Acacia merrickiae is a spindly, open, glabrous, usually single-stemmed shrub that typically grows to a height of 2–4 m (6 ft 7 in – 13 ft 1 in) and has branchlets that are covered in a fine, white, powdery bloom and roughened by scars of fallen phyllodes. Its phyllodes are elliptic to egg-shaped 15–35 mm (0.59–1.38 in) long, 7–15 mm (0.28–0.59 in) wide and leathery with a slightly raised midrib. The flowers are borne in spherical or slightly oblong heads on the ends of branches, in racemes 10–40 mm (0.39–1.57 in) long, the heads 5–6 mm (0.20–0.24 in) in diameter on peduncles 6–13 mm (0.24–0.51 in) long with 45 to 65 light golden yellow flowers. Flowering occurs from April to June, and the pods are linear, up to 65 mm (2.6 in) long, 5–6 mm (0.20–0.24 in) wide and rounded over and more or less constricted between the seeds. The seeds are oblong to slightly elliptic, and dull dark brown with a club-shaped aril.

== Taxonomy ==
Acacia merrickiae was first formally described in 1927 by Joseph Maiden and William Blakely in the Journal of the Royal Society of Western Australia from specimens collected by Charles Gardner at Nalyering Well near North Kellerberrin in 1922. Merrick's wattle belongs to the A. microbotrya group, is similar to some forms of A. leptopetala and is closely related to A. meisneri.

== Distribution and habit ==
This species of wattle grows in clay and sandy loam in open woodland, and is only known from near Kellerberrin and Mukinbudin in the Avon Wheatbelt bioregion in the south-west of Western Australia.

== Conservation status ==
Acacia merrickiae is listed as 'Priority Four' by the Government of Western Australia Department of Biodiversity, Conservation and Attractions, meaning that it is rare or near threatened.

== See also ==
- List of Acacia species
