= Acacia incongesta =

Peak Charles wattle

Scientific classification
- Kingdom: Plantae
- Clade: Embryophytes
- Clade: Tracheophytes
- Clade: Spermatophytes
- Clade: Angiosperms
- Clade: Eudicots
- Clade: Rosids
- Order: Fabales
- Family: Fabaceae
- Subfamily: Caesalpinioideae
- Clade: Mimosoid clade
- Genus: Acacia
- Species: A. incongesta

Binomial name
- Acacia incongesta R.S.Cowan & Maslin

Synonyms
- Racosperma incongestum (R.S.Cowan & Maslin) Pedley

Species of legume

Acacia incongesta, also known as Peak Charles wattle, is a species of flowering plant in the family Fabaceae and is endemic to Peak Charles National Park in Western Australia. It is a dense, rounded shrub with ascending to erect, narrowly elliptic, curved phyllodes, spikes of cream-coloured flowers, and linear, thinly leathery pods strongly raised over the seeds.

== Description ==
Acacia incongesta is a dense, rounded shrub that typically growing to a height of 0.6–4 m (2 ft 0 in – 13 ft 1 in) and has glabrous branchlets, at least at first. Its phyllodes are ascending to erect, narrowly elliptic and curved, 40–70 mm (1.6–2.8 in) long and 3–4.5 mm (0.12–0.18 in) wide, sharply pointed and covered with soft hairs on the veins. The flower are borne in two spikes 15–25 mm (0.59–0.98 in) long and 3–4.5 mm (0.12–0.18 in) in diameter, with cream-coloured flowers. Flowering occurs from March to June, and the pods are pendent, linear, strongly raised over and slightly constricted between the seeds, up to 105 mm (4.1 in) long and 4 mm (0.16 in) wide, thinly leathery and glabrous. The seeds are broadly elliptic, 3–4 mm (0.12–0.16 in) long and subglossy black.

== Taxonomy ==
Acacia incongesta was first formally described in 1995 by Richard Cowan and Bruce Maslin in the journal Nuytsia from specimens collected on Peak Charles by Alex George in 1971. The specific epithet (incongesta) means 'not crowded', referring to the more or less loosely flowered spikes of this species, separating it from its close relative, Acacia neurophylla.

== Distribution and habitat ==
Peak Charles wattle grows on lower granitic mountain slopes and sometimes on sandly clay flats, and is restricted to Peak Charles National Park in the Mallee bioregion of Western Australia.

== See also ==
- List of Acacia species
