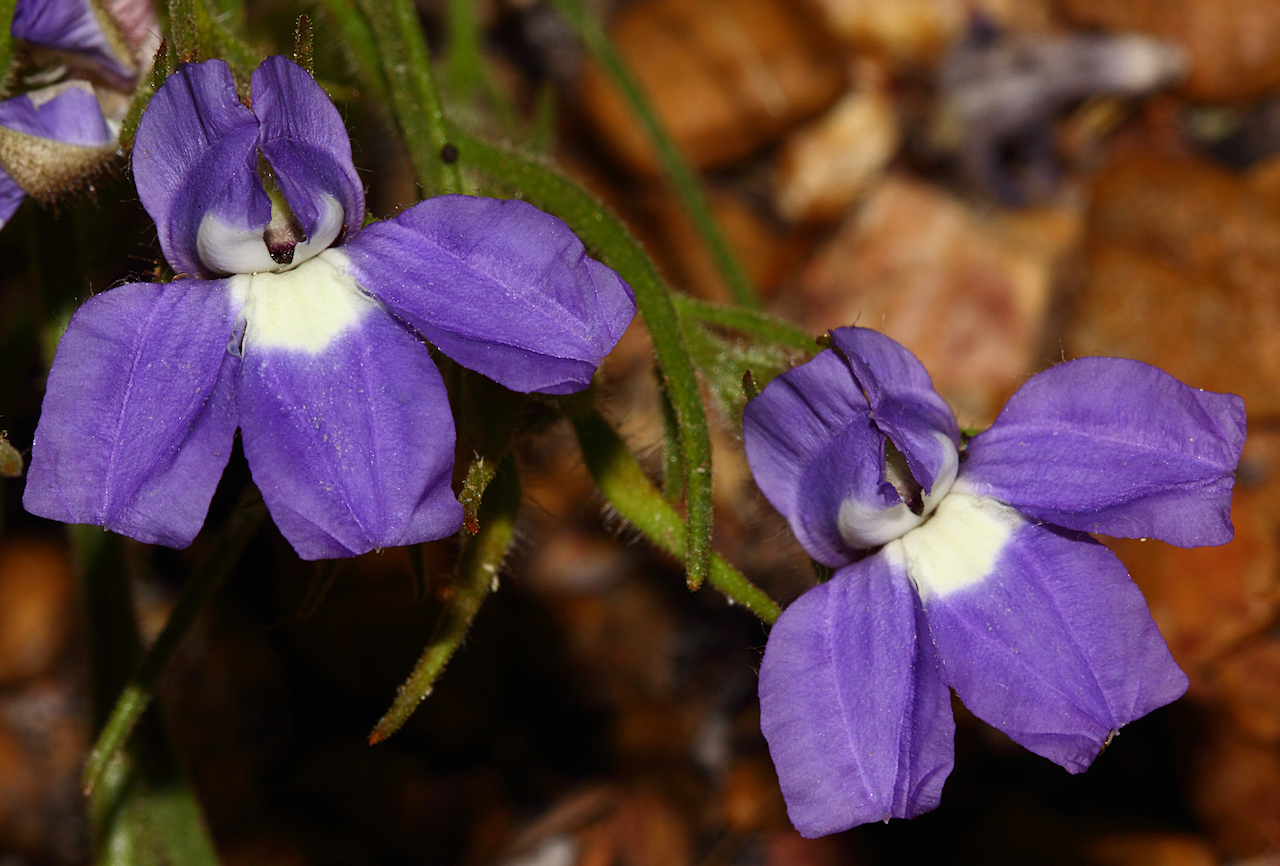

Conservation status
- Declared rare (DEC)

Scientific classification
- Kingdom: Plantae
- Clade: Tracheophytes
- Clade: Angiosperms
- Clade: Eudicots
- Clade: Asterids
- Order: Asterales
- Family: Goodeniaceae
- Genus: Goodenia
- Species: G. arthrotricha

Binomial name
- Goodenia arthrotricha Benth.

Synonyms
- Goodenia bonneyana F.Muell.

= Goodenia arthrotricha =

Species of plant

Goodenia arthrotricha is a species of flowering plant in the family Goodeniaceae and endemic to south-western Western Australia. It is an erect perennial, herb with linear to lance-shaped leaves with the narrower end towards the base, racemes of blue flowers with linear bracteoles at the base, and oval fruit.

== Description ==
Goodenia arthrotricha is an erect, perennial herb that typically grows to a height of 40 cm (16 in) and has unribbed stems. The leaves are linear to lance-shaped with the narrower end towards the base, 20–50 mm (0.79–1.97 in) long, 3–5 mm (0.12–0.20 in) wide and sessile, the leaves on the stem smaller than those at the base. The flowers are arranged in a thyrse up to 20 mm (0.79 in) long on a peduncle 20–60 mm (0.79–2.36 in) long with linear bracteoles 1.5–2.5 mm (0.059–0.098 in) long at the base, each flower on a pedicel 3–7 mm (0.12–0.28 in) long. The sepals are lance-shaped, 9–10 mm (0.35–0.39 in) long and the corolla is blue and 40–20 mm (1.57–0.79 in) long. The lower lobes of the corolla are about 5 mm (0.20 in) long with wings about 2 mm (0.079 in) wide. Flowering occurs from October to November and the fruit is an oval capsule 4–5 mm (0.16–0.20 in) long.

== Taxonomy and naming ==
Goodenia arthrotricha was first formally described in 1868 by George Bentham in Flora Australiensis from specimens collected by James Drummond. The specific epithet (arthrotricha) means "jointed hair".

== Distribution and habitat ==
This goodenia grows between granite rocks near Wannamal in the Avon Wheatbelt, Jarrah Forest and Swan Coastal Plain biogeographic regions in the south-west of Western Australia.

== Conservation status ==
Goddenia arthrotricha is classified as "Threatened Flora (Declared Rare Flora — Extant)" by the Department of Environment and Conservation (Western Australia).
