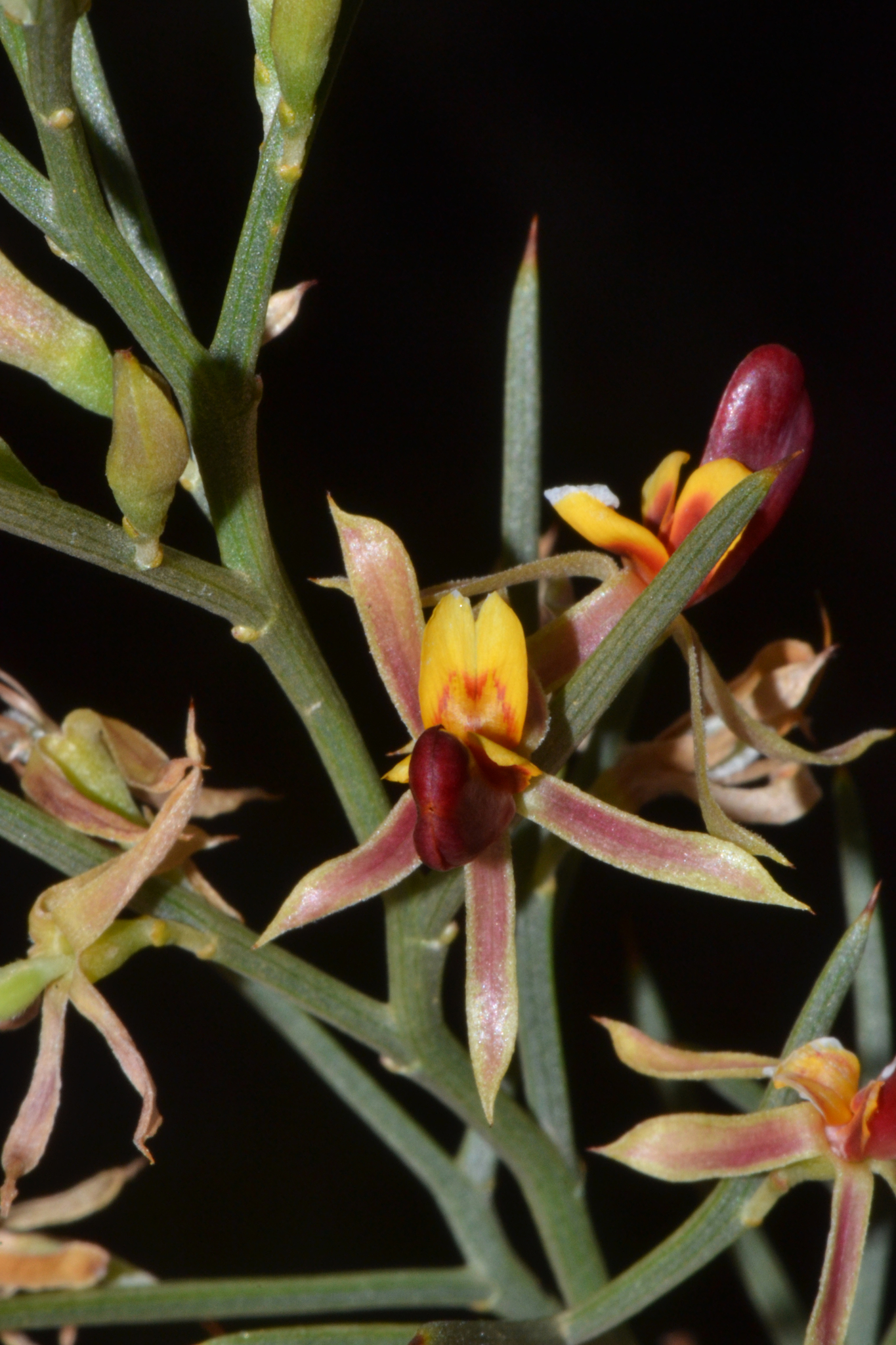

Scientific classification
- Kingdom: Plantae
- Clade: Tracheophytes
- Clade: Angiosperms
- Clade: Eudicots
- Clade: Rosids
- Order: Fabales
- Family: Fabaceae
- Subfamily: Faboideae
- Genus: Jacksonia
- Species: J. nutans

Binomial name
- Jacksonia nutans Chappill

= Jacksonia nutans =

Species of legume

Jacksonia nutans is a species of flowering plant in the family Fabaceae and is endemic to the south-west of Western Australia. It is an erect, prickly shrub with yellow to greyish-green branches, sharply-pointed branchlets, leaves reduced to triangular scales, orange flowers with red markings, and woody, densely hairy, round or elliptic pods.

== Description ==
Jacksonia nutans is an erect, prickly, densely branched shrub that typically grows up to 0.3–1.6 m (1 ft 0 in – 5 ft 3 in) high and 0.75–1.5 m (2 ft 6 in – 4 ft 11 in) wide. It has greyish-green branches, sharply-pointed branchlets mostly 2–18 mm (0.079–0.709 in) long and 0.4–0.7 mm (0.016–0.028 in) wide, its leaves reduced to egg-shaped, dark brown scales, 0.7–2 mm (0.028–0.079 in) long and 0.6–1.6 mm (0.024–0.063 in) wide. The flowers are arranged singly or in pairs on the branchlets on a pedicel 1.9–2.8 mm (0.075–0.110 in) long, with egg-shaped bracteoles 0.6–1 mm (0.024–0.039 in) long and 0.5–0.7 mm (0.020–0.028 in) wide. The floral tube is 0.9–1.2 mm (0.035–0.047 in) long and the sepals are membranous, with lobes 6.4–10 mm (0.25–0.39 in) long and 1.3–1.7 mm (0.051–0.067 in) wide and fused for 0.3–0.6 mm (0.012–0.024 in). The standard petal is orange with red markings, 4.0–4.6 mm (0.16–0.18 in) long and 3.5–4.0 mm (0.14–0.16 in) deep, the wings orange with red markings 4.7–5.0 mm (0.19–0.20 in) long, and the keel is red, 6.2–7.0 mm (0.24–0.28 in) long. The stamens have pink filaments 3.8–5.2 mm (0.15–0.20 in) long. Flowering occurs throughout the year, and the fruit is a round or elliptic, woody, densely hairy pod 5–8 mm (0.20–0.31 in) long and 3.4–4.8 mm (0.13–0.19 in) wide.

== Taxonomy ==
Jacksonia nutans was first formally described in 2007 by Jennifer Anne Chappill in Australian Systematic Botany from specimens collected by Chappill and Carolyn F. Wilkins north of the Moora-Badgingarra Road in 1991. The specific epithet (nutans) means 'nodding', referring to the strongly down-curved pedicels of the fruit.

== Distribution and habitat ==
This species of Jacksonia grows on sand on sandplains and sand dunes from Geraldton to the Moore River area and east to Watheroo National Park, Moora and Wannamal in the Geraldton Sandplains, Jarrah Forest and Swan Coastal Plain bioregions of south-western Western Australia.

== Conservation status ==
Jacksonia nutans is listed as "not threatened" by the Government of Western Australia Department of Biodiversity, Conservation and Attractions.
