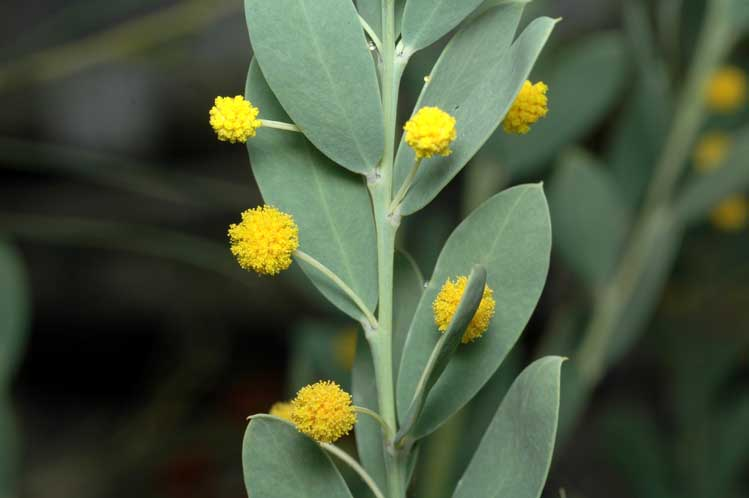
- In the Australian National Botanic Gardens

Scientific classification
- Kingdom: Plantae
- Clade: Tracheophytes
- Clade: Angiosperms
- Clade: Eudicots
- Clade: Rosids
- Order: Fabales
- Family: Fabaceae
- Subfamily: Caesalpinioideae
- Clade: Mimosoid clade
- Genus: Acacia
- Species: A. meisneri

Binomial name
- Acacia meisneri Lehm. ex Meisn.
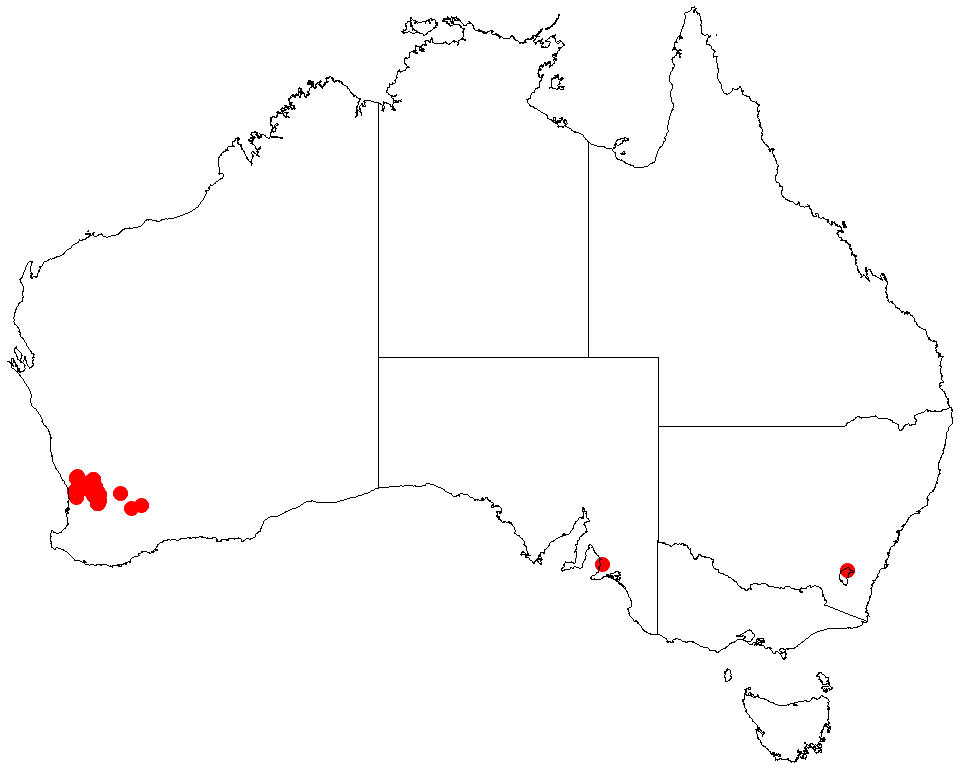
- Occurrence data from AVH

Synonyms
- Acacia angustifolia B.D.Jacks. nom. inval., nom. nud.; Acacia meisneri Lehm. nom. inval., nom. nud.; Acacia meisneri var. angustifolia Meisn.; Acacia meisneri Lehm. ex Meisn. var. meisneri; Acacia meissneri F.Muell. orth. var.; Racosperma meisneri (Lehm. ex Meisn.) Pedley; Acacia triquetra auct. non Benth.: Bentham, G. (5 October 1864)

= Acacia meisneri =

Species of legume

Acacia meisneri is a species of flowering plant in the family Fabaceae and is endemic to the south-west of Western Australia. It is a dense, glabrous, funnel-shaped or rounded shrub with elliptic to egg-shaped or lance-shaped phyllodes, spherical heads of golden yellow flowers, and biconvex, crusty pods, deeply constricted between the seeds.

== Description ==
Acacia meisneri is a dense, glabrous, funnel-shaped or rounded shrub that typically grows to a height of 2–4 m (6 ft 7 in – 13 ft 1 in), its branchlets covered with a white, powdery bloom. Its phyllodes are elliptic to egg-shaped or lance-shaped with the narrower end towards the base, 15–40 mm (0.59–1.57 in) long, 5–15 mm (0.20–0.59 in) wide, grey to glaucous, often covered with a white, powdery bloom and with one vein on each face. The flowers are borne in three to seven spherical, rarely oblong heads in racemes 3–18 mm (0.12–0.71 in) long, the heads on peduncles mostly 7–20 mm (0.28–0.79 in) long. Flowering occurs sporadically throughout the year, and the pods are biconvex, up to 100 mm (3.9 in) long, 6–7 mm (0.24–0.28 in) wide, custy, sometimes covered with a powdery bloom, deeply constricted between the seeds and easily fragmenting at the constrictions. The seeds are elliptic to oblong, 5.5–7 mm (0.22–0.28 in) long and dull black with a thick aril.

== Taxonomy ==
Acacia meisneri was first formally described in 1842 by Johann Georg Christian Lehmann in Delectus Seminum quae in Horto Hamburgensium botanico e collectione from specimens he collected near York in 1839, but the name was invalid because there was no description of the species. In 1844, Carl Meissner validly published the species in Lehmann's Plantae Preissianae. The specific epithet (meisneri) was suggested in 1842 by Lehmann to honour Meisner.

== Distribution ==
This species of wattle occurs mainly in the drainage basin of the Avon River from around Goomalling to near Brookton with an outlying population near Wannamal. It grows in clay, sandy clay and loamy soils, and sometimes in rocky soils, often in Eucalyptus wandoo woodland and on roadsides, in the Avon Wheatbelt, Jarrah Forest and Swan Coastal Plain bioregions of south-western Western Australia.

== See also ==
- List of Acacia species
