= Acacia glutinosissima =

Scientific classification
- Kingdom: Plantae
- Clade: Tracheophytes
- Clade: Angiosperms
- Clade: Eudicots
- Clade: Rosids
- Order: Fabales
- Family: Fabaceae
- Subfamily: Caesalpinioideae
- Clade: Mimosoid clade
- Genus: Acacia
- Species: A. glutinosissima

Binomial name
- Acacia glutinosissima Maiden & Blakely
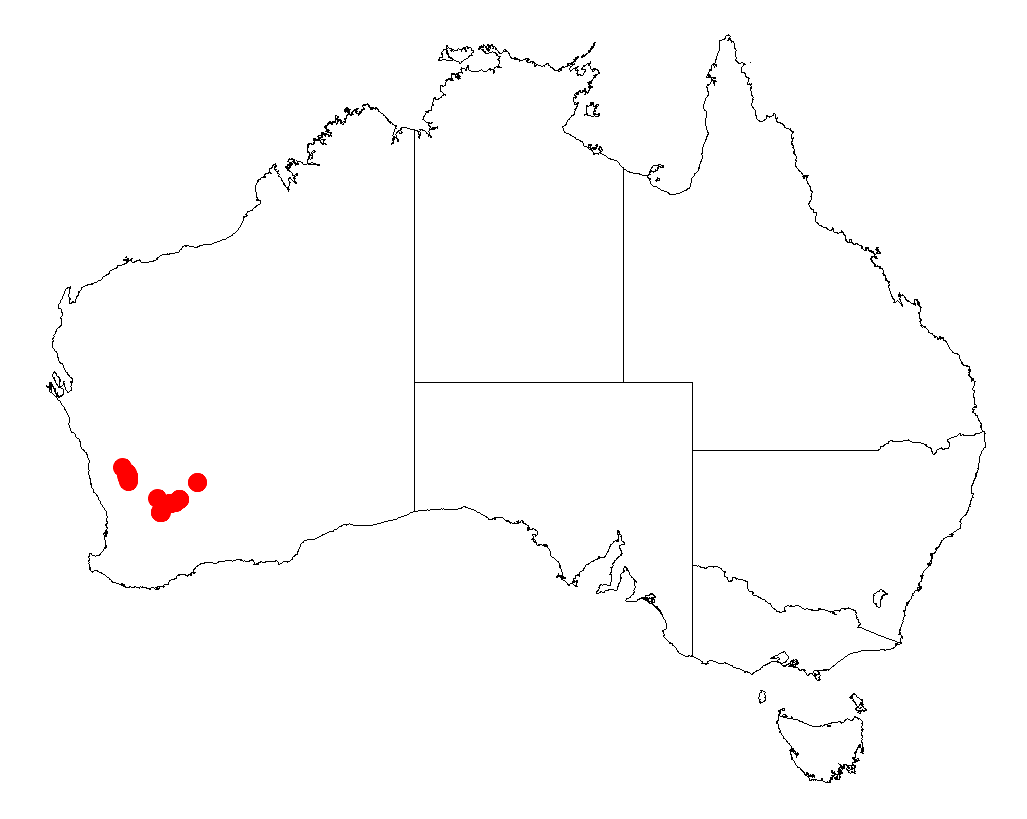
- Occurrence data from AVH

Synonyms
- Racosperma glutinosissimum (Maiden & Blakely) Pedley

Species of legume

Habit about 8.8 km south of Wubin

Acacia glutinosissima is a species of flowering plant in the family Fabaceae and is endemic to the south-west of Western Australia. It is a very spindly, sticky, sparingly branched, open shrub with roughened branchlets where phyllodes have fallen, ascending to erect linear phyllodes, spherical heads of golden yellow flowers and linear, crusty to leathery pods.

== Description ==
Acacia glutinosissima is a very spindly, sticky, sparingly branched, open shrub that typically grows to a height of 1.8–3.0 m (5 ft 11 in – 9 ft 10 in). Its branchlets are roughened by obvious stem-projections where phyllodes have fallen. The phyllodes are ascending to erect, linear, 90–170 mm (3.5–6.7 in) long and usually 2–3.5 mm (0.079–0.138 in) long and lack a prominent midrib. There are linear stipules 2–5 mm (0.079–0.197 in) long at the base of the phyllodes but fall as the phyllodes mature and a gland 1–3 mm (0.039–0.118 in) above the pulvinus. The flowers are borne in spherical heads on peduncles 15–40 mm (0.59–1.57 in) long, each head with 40 to 55 densely arranged golden yellow flowers. Flowering occurs from July to September, and the pods are linear, up to 100 mm (3.9 in) long and 3.5–4.5 mm (0.14–0.18 in) wide and custy to leathery. The seeds are oblong, 4.0–4.5 mm (0.16–0.18 in) wide with an aril.

== Taxonomy ==
Acacia glutinosissima was first formally described in 1927 by Joseph Maiden and William Blakely in the Journal of the Royal Society of Western Australia from specimens collected "15 mi (24 km) north-east of Westonia, in yellow, sandy soil in thickets of Melaleuca and Casuarina horrida (now Allocasuarina corniculata), with Eucalyptus oldfieldii" by Charles Gardner in 1922. The specific epithet (glutinosissima) means 'extremely sticky'.

== Distribution and habitat ==
This species of wattle grows in laterite or in gravelly sand or loam, often in open scrub in the Latham-Wubin area, and from Kununoppin east to Westonia and south to Bruce Rock, in the Avon Wheatbelt bioregion of south-western Western Australia.

== Conservation status ==
Acacia glutinosissima is listed as 'Not threatened' by the Government of Western Australia Department of Biodiversity, Conservation and Attractions.

== See also ==
- List of Acacia species
