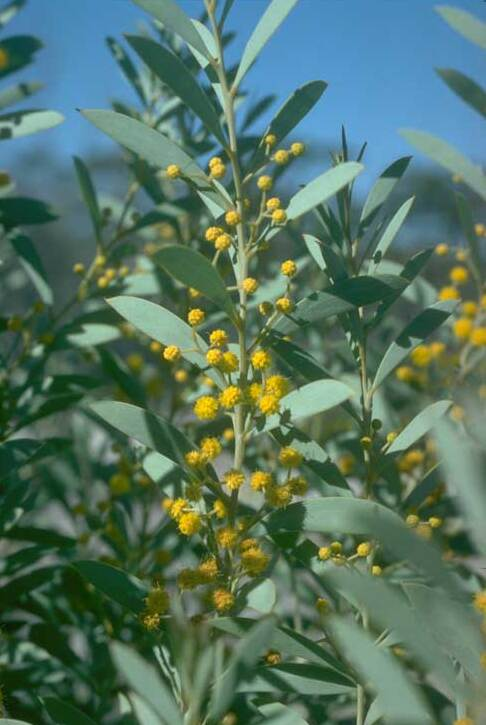
- At Hippo's Yawn near Hyden

Scientific classification
- Kingdom: Plantae
- Clade: Tracheophytes
- Clade: Angiosperms
- Clade: Eudicots
- Clade: Rosids
- Order: Fabales
- Family: Fabaceae
- Subfamily: Caesalpinioideae
- Clade: Mimosoid clade
- Genus: Acacia
- Species: A. leptopetala

Binomial name
- Acacia leptopetala Benth.
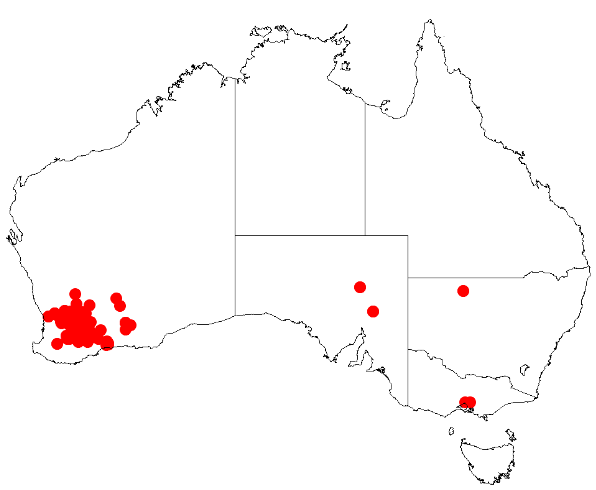
- Occurrence data from AVH

Synonyms
- Racosperma leptopetalum (Benth.) Pedley

= Acacia leptopetala =

Species of legume

Acacia leptopetala is a species of flowering plant in the family Fabaceae and is endemic to the south-west of Western Australia. It is commonly a dense, glabrous shrub with many stems, usually narrowly elliptic to narrowly lance-shaped phyllodes, spherical heads of light golden yellow flowers and linear pods rounded over the seeds.

== Description ==
Acacia leptopetala is commonly a dense, glabrous shrub that typically grows to a height of 1–3 m (3 ft 3 in – 9 ft 10 in) and has many stems. Its branchlets are often covered in a fine white powdery bloom. Its phyllodes are usually narrowly elliptic to narrowly lance-shaped with the narrower end towards the base, 20–55 mm (0.79–2.17 in) long and 3–11 mm (0.12–0.43 in) wide, often with a hooked tip, thinly leathery, and more or less glaucous with a raised midrib. The flowers are usually borne in three to six spherical heads in racemes 10–30 mm (0.39–1.18 in) long on peduncles 3–8 mm (0.12–0.31 in) long, the heads 3.5–4.0 mm (0.14–0.16 in) in diameter with 25 to 35 light golden yellow flowers. Flowering occurs in November and December, sometimes in January, and the pods are linear, up to 95 mm (3.7 in) long and usually 4.5–6.0 mm (0.18–0.24 in) wide, thinly leathery to slightly crusty and glabrous, rounded over the seeds and usually more or less constricted between them. The seeds are egg-shaped, oblong or elliptic, usually 5–6 mm (0.20–0.24 in) long and dull black with a thick aril.

== Taxonomy ==
Acacia leptopetala was first formally described in 1855 by George Bentham in the journal Linnaea: ein Journal für die Botanik in ihrem ganzen Umfange, oder Beiträge zur Pflanzenkunde from specimens collected by James Drummond. The specific epithet (leptopetala) means 'thin or slender petals'.

== Distribution and habitat ==
This species of wattle grows in clay, loam, sand and gravel in mallee scrub, from near Bencubbin, south to Nyabing, and east to near Ravensthorpe in the Avon Wheatbelt, Coolgardie, Esperance Plains and Mallee bioregions of south-western Western Australia.

== Conservation status ==
Acacia leptopetala is listed as 'not threatened' by the Government of Western Australia Department of Biodiversity, Conservation and Attractions.

== See also ==
- List of Acacia species
