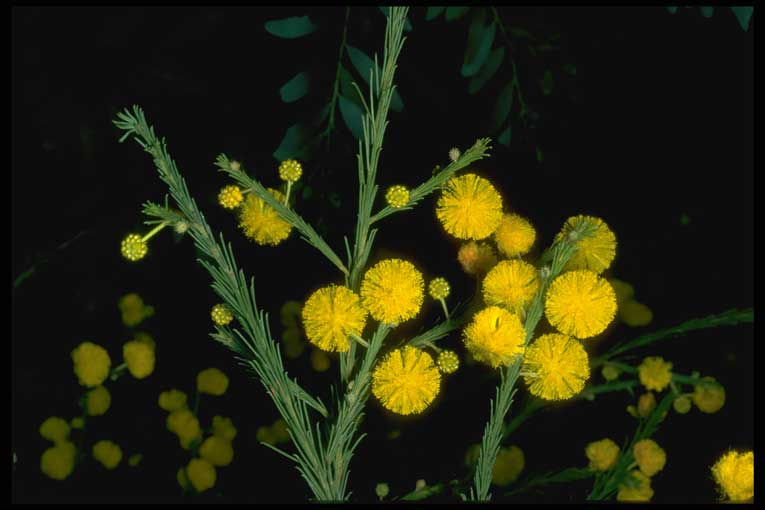
- In the Australian Botanic Garden Mount Annan

Conservation status
- Vulnerable (EPBC Act)

Scientific classification
- Kingdom: Plantae
- Clade: Tracheophytes
- Clade: Angiosperms
- Clade: Eudicots
- Clade: Rosids
- Order: Fabales
- Family: Fabaceae
- Subfamily: Caesalpinioideae
- Clade: Mimosoid clade
- Genus: Acacia
- Species: A. handonis

Binomial name
- Acacia handonis Pedley
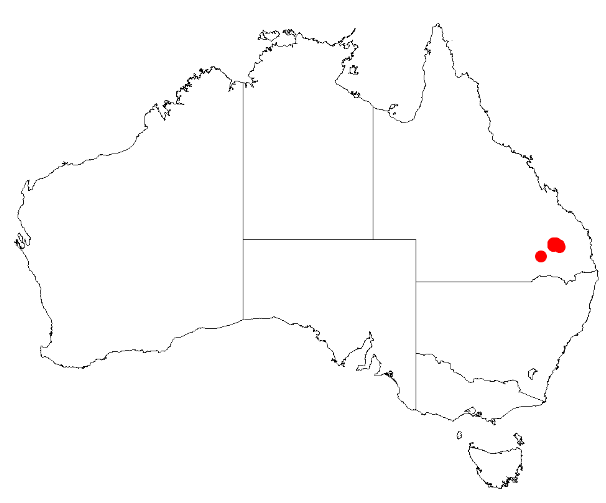
- Occurrence data from AVH

= Acacia handonis =

Hando's wattle

Species of legume

Acacia handonis, commonly known as Hando's wattle or Percy Grant wattle, is a species of flowering plant in the family Fabaceae and is endemic to Queensland, Australia. It is a resinous shrub with crowded, erect phyllodes, spherical heads of bright yellow flowers and narrowly oblong pods.

== Description ==
Acacia handonis is resinous, slender shrub that typically grows up to 1–2 m (3 ft 3 in – 6 ft 7 in) high and wide. It has finely ribbed branchlets covered with short, scattered, glandular hairs. Its phyllodes are crowded, erect and straight, sometimes slightly curved near the tip, 6–18 mm (0.24–0.71 in) long and about 0.4 mm (0.016 in) wide and sometimes with a gland near the middle of the phyllode. The flowers are borne in a spherical head in axils on a peduncle mostly 6–10 mm (0.24–0.39 in) long with about 30 bright yellow, sticky flowers. Flowering mostly occurs from July to September, and the pods are narrowly oblong, up to 40 mm (1.6 in) long and 3–4 mm (0.12–0.16 in) wide with prominent raised outgrowths on the valves. The seeds are oblong, about 4 mm (0.16 in) long with a club-shaped aril.

== Taxonomy ==
Acacia handonis was first formally described in 1981 by Leslie Pedley from a specimen collected in the Barakula State Forest in 1978. The specific epithet (handonis) honours "Mrs. V. Hando", who collected specimens for Pedley.

== Distribution and habitat ==
Hando's wattle is extremely rare, known only from the Barakula area north of Chinchilla in Queensland where it grows in undulating country, often on stony ridges in lateritic soils with grey sand or clayey silt with ironstone gravel in Eucalyptus woodland and open forest. In 1994 the total population was estimated to be 10,080 individual plants where 4,200 are mature and the remainder are juveniles. They were distributed over three separate stands with a large variation in the density of plants. None of the plants are found in conservation areas.

== Conservation status ==
Acacia handonis is listed as vulnerable under the Environment Protection and Biodiversity Conservation Act 1999 and the Queensland Nature Conservation Act 1992.

== See also ==
- List of Acacia' species
