= Acacia heteroneura =

Scientific classification
- Kingdom: Plantae
- Clade: Embryophytes
- Clade: Tracheophytes
- Clade: Spermatophytes
- Clade: Angiosperms
- Clade: Eudicots
- Clade: Rosids
- Order: Fabales
- Family: Fabaceae
- Subfamily: Caesalpinioideae
- Clade: Mimosoid clade
- Genus: Acacia
- Species: A. heteroneura

Binomial name
- Acacia heteroneura Benth.
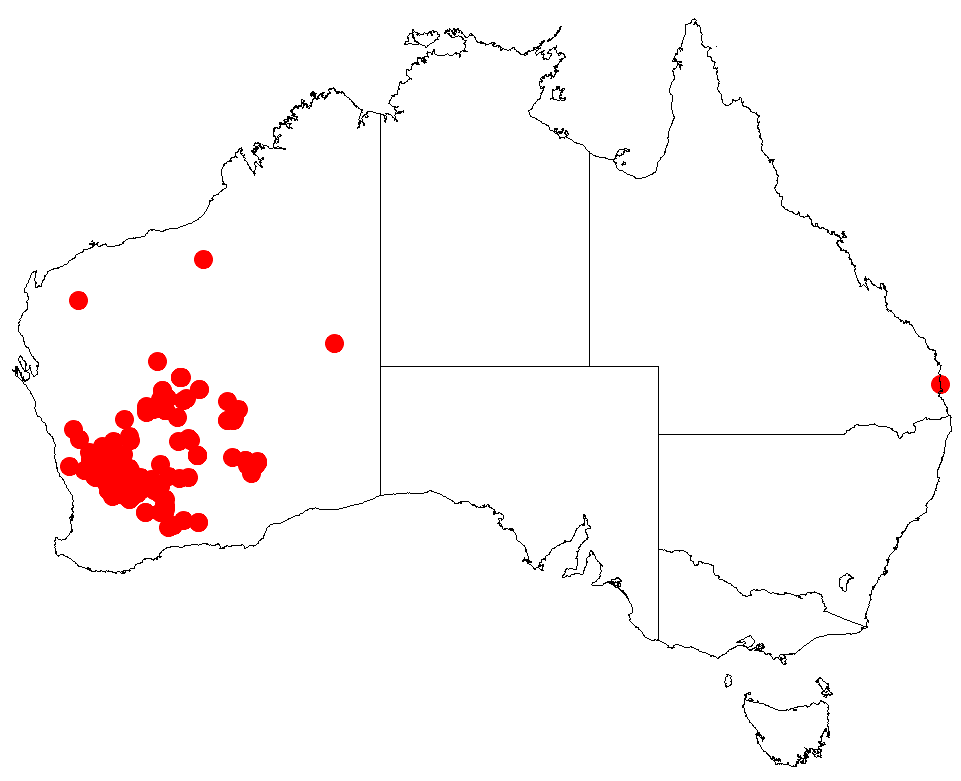
- Occurrence data from AVH

Synonyms
- Racosperma heteroneurum (Benth.) Pedley

Species of legume

Acacia heteroneura is a species of flowering plant in the family Fabaceae and is endemic to Western Australia. It is a shrub with linear phyllodes, spherical to elliptic or oblong heads or bright golden yellow flowers and more or less erect, linear, straight pods.

== Description ==
Acacia heteroneura is a shrub that typically grows to a height of 0.5–3.5 m (1 ft 8 in – 11 ft 6 in) and has branchlets with silky hairs between glabrous, resinous ribs. Its phyllodes are linear to four-sided or flat in cross section, rigid, 30–130 mm (1.2–5.1 in) long and 0.7–3.5 mm (0.028–0.138 in) wide, green to grey-green or glaucous. The phyllodes have silky hairs between the veins, the veins often resinous and sometimes the central vein and edge veins prominent and wider than the secondary veins. The flowers are bright golden yellow and borne in one or two spherical, elliptic or oblong heads in axils, 5–9 mm (0.20–0.35 in) long and 5–8 mm (0.20–0.31 in) wide. Flowering time depends on variety, and the pods are normally more or less erect, linear and straight, up to 105 mm (4.1 in) long, 1.5–3 mm (0.059–0.118 in) wide and crust-like to woody, almost shiny and mottled with an aril up to the same length as the seed.

== Taxonomy ==
Acacia heteroneura was first formally described in 1855 by George Bentham in the journal Linnaea: Ein Journal für die Botanik in ihrem ganzen Umfange, oder Beiträge zur Pflanzenkunde from specimens collected by James Drummond. The specific epithet (heteroneura) means 'different nerved', referring to the phyllodes having one main and several fine veins.

In 1995, Richard Cowan and Bruce Maslin described four varieties of C. heteronema and the names are accepted by the Australian Plant Census:

- Acacia heteroneura Benth. var. heteroneura has compressed four-sided to flat phyllodes 50–70 mm (2.0–2.8 in) long and 2–4 mm (0.079–0.157 in) wide, spherical heads 5–6 mm (0.20–0.24 in) in diameter, and flowers mainly from August to January.
- Acacia heteroneura var. jutsonii (Maiden) R.S.Cowan & Maslin (previously known as Acacia jutsonii) has angular phyllodes, four-sided in cross section,40–70 mm (1.6–2.8 in) long and 1.0–1.7 mm (0.039–0.067 in) wide, spherical to widely elliptic, heads 5–8 mm (0.20–0.31 in) long and 5–7 mm (0.20–0.28 in) in diameter, and flowers throughout the year, especially from June to January.
- Acacia heteroneura var. petila R.S.Cowan & Maslin has more or less terete to four-sided in cross sections phyllodes, 30–60 mm (1.2–2.4 in) long and 1.7–1.0 mm (0.067–0.039 in) wide, spherical heads 5–6 mm (0.20–0.24 in) in diameter, and flowers from May to January.
- Acacia heteroneura var. prolixa R.S.Cowan & Maslin has phyllodes that are angular to four-sided in cross section and sometimes more or less flat, 70–130 mm (2.8–5.1 in) long and 1.0–1.5 mm (0.039–0.059 in) wide, widely elliptic to oblong heads 8–9 mm (0.31–0.35 in) long and 7–8 mm (0.28–0.31 in) in diameter, and flowers in September and October.

== Distribution and habitat ==
This species of wattle grows in sand, sandy loam and gravel on sandplains, sand dunes, ridges and lateritic rises in the Avon Wheatbelt, Coolgardie, Gascoyne, Geraldton Sandplains, Great Sandy Desert, Great Victoria Desert, Mallee, Murchison and Yalgoo bioregions of Western Australia.

- Variety heteronema is most common from Tammin south-east to Bruce Rock and east to Westonia where it grows in mixed shrubland and scrub.
- Variety jutsonii has a disjunct distribution from Kalannie and south-east to Frank Hann National Park and Comet Vale, Bandya Station and Queen Victoria Spring Nature Reserve.
- Variety petila has a restricted distribution from Miling to Trayning, with a variant from Morawa and near Wubin.
- Variety prolixa has a scattered distribution from Wubin and east to near Wiluna and Laverton where it grows in red sand in shrubland with spinifex.

== Conservation status ==
Acacia heteroneura and all its varieties are listed as "not threatened" by the Western Australian Government Department of Biodiversity, Conservation and Attractions.

== See also ==
- List of Acacia species
