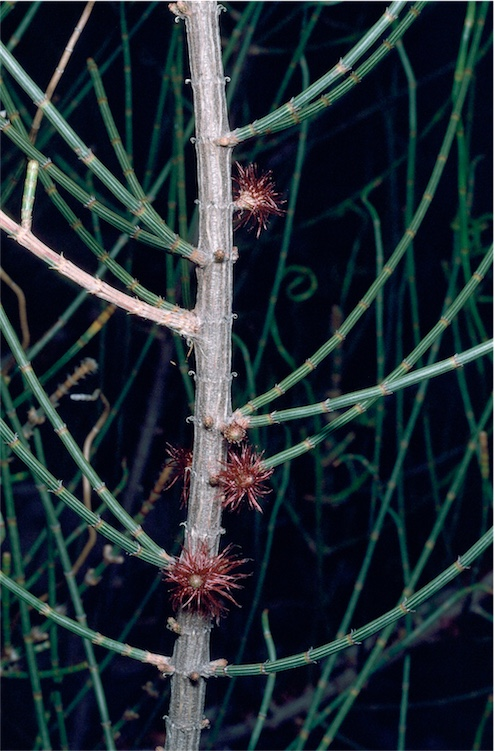
- Branchlets and young female inflorescences

Scientific classification
- Kingdom: Plantae
- Clade: Tracheophytes
- Clade: Angiosperms
- Clade: Eudicots
- Clade: Rosids
- Order: Fagales
- Family: Casuarinaceae
- Genus: Allocasuarina
- Species: A. corniculata

Binomial name
- Allocasuarina corniculata (F.Muell.) L.A.S.Johnson
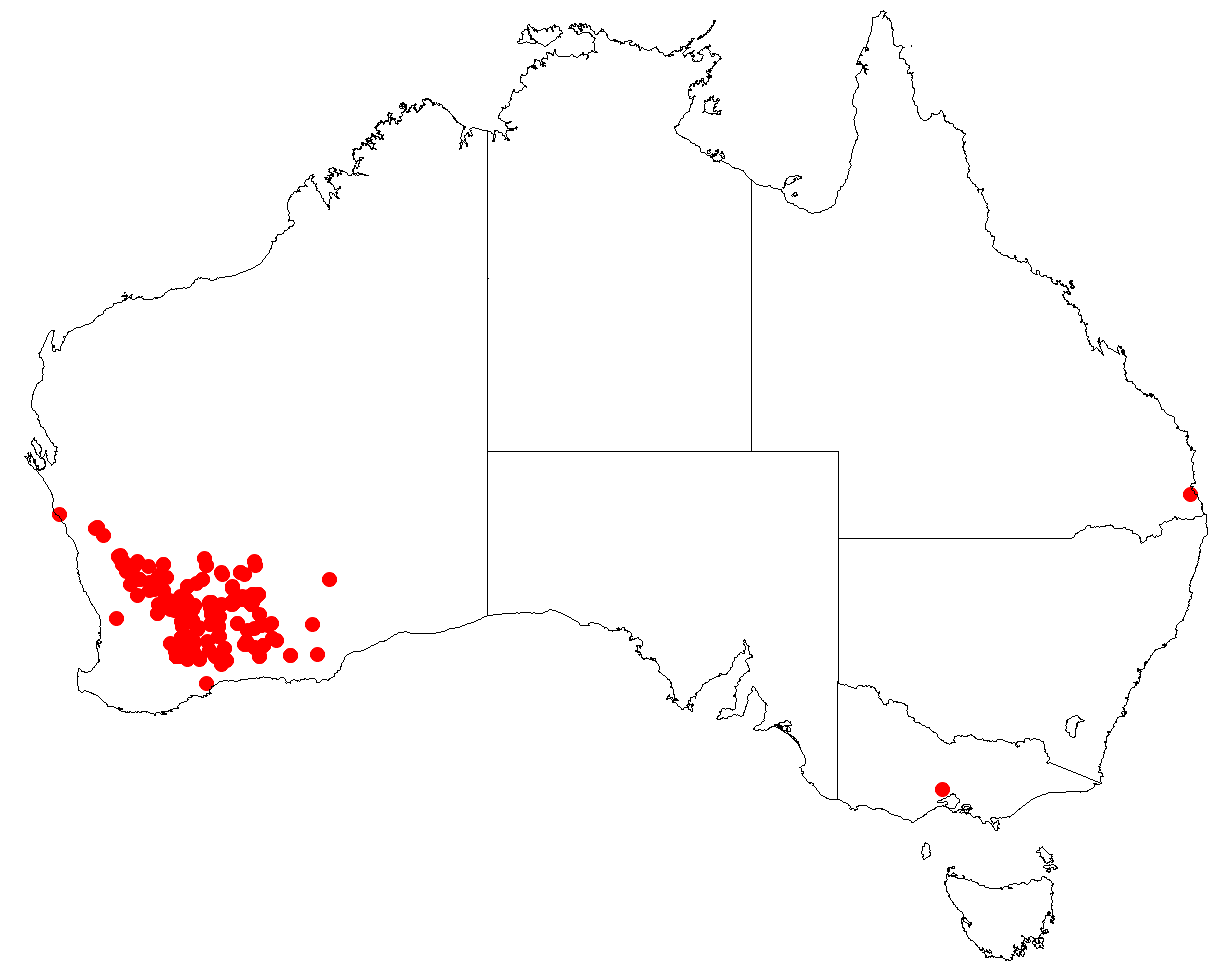
- Occurrence data from AVH

Synonyms
- Casuarina corniculata F.Muell.; Casuarina horrida D.A.Herb.

= Allocasuarina corniculata =

Species of flowering plant

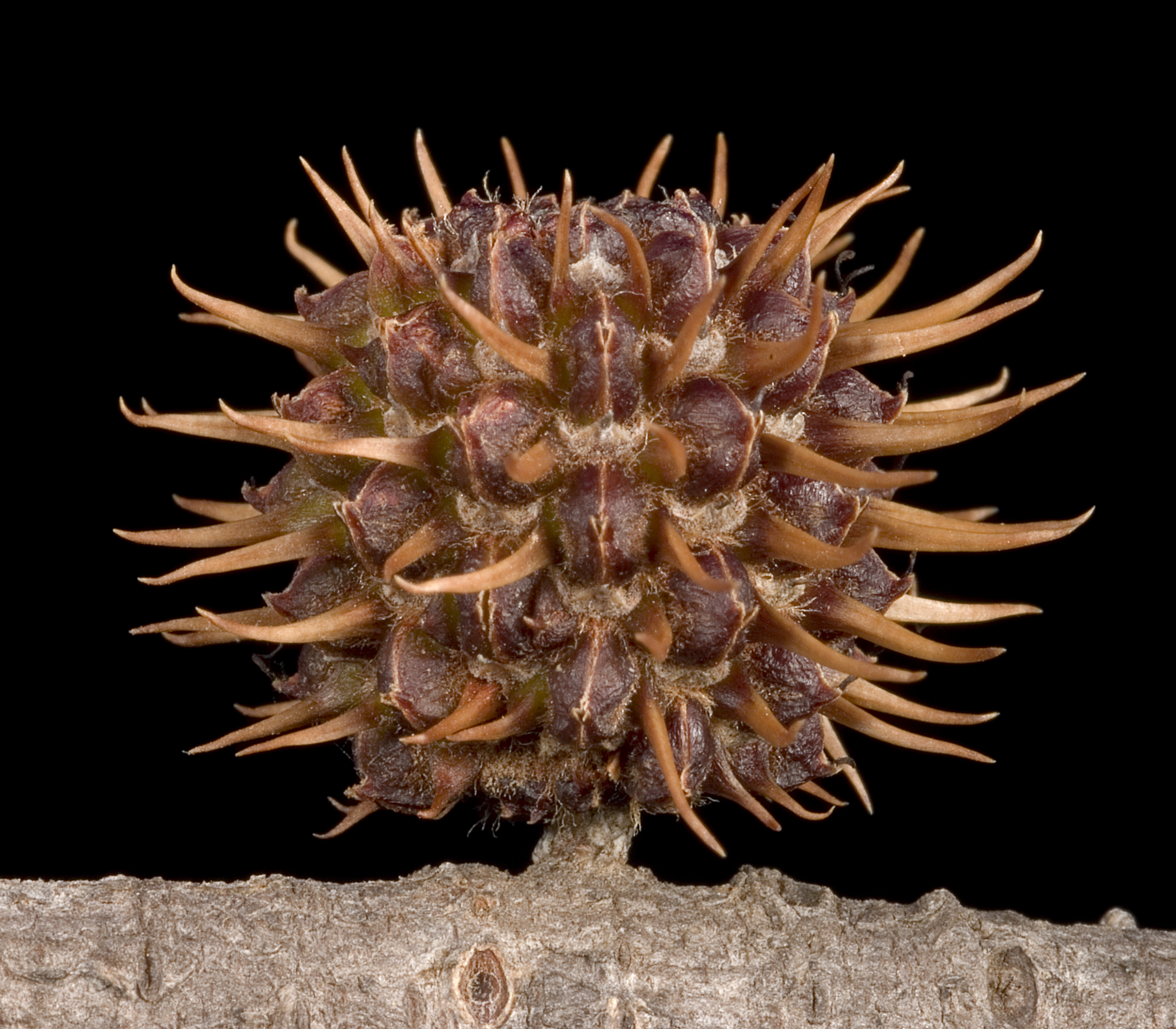
Mature cone

Allocasuarina corniculata is a species of flowering plant in the family Casuarinaceae and is endemic to the south-west of Western Australia. It is an erect to spreading, dioecious shrub that has more or less erect branchlets, the leaves reduced to scales in whorls of six to eleven, the mature fruiting cones 8–15 mm (0.31–0.59 in) long containing winged seeds (samaras) 3–4 mm (0.12–0.16 in) long.

== Description ==
Allocasuarina corniculata is an erect to spreading, dioecious shrub that typically grows to a height of 1–5 m (3 ft 3 in – 16 ft 5 in). Its branchlets are more or less erect, up to 260 mm (10 in) long, the leaves reduced to erect, scale-like teeth 0.3–0.6 mm (0.012–0.024 in) long, arranged in whorls of six to eleven around the branchlets. The sections of branchlet between the leaf whorls (the "articles") are mostly 6–11 mm (0.24–0.43 in) long and 0.9–1.4 mm (0.035–0.055 in) wide. Male flowers are arranged in spikes 5–20 mm (0.20–0.79 in) long, in whorls of 10 to 16 per centimetre (per 0.39 in.), the anthers 0.5–0.9 mm (0.020–0.035 in) long. Female cones are red, glabrous and sessile or on a peduncle up to 3 mm (0.12 in) long. Mature cones are 8–15 mm (0.31–0.59 in) long and 7–9 mm (0.28–0.35 in) in diameter with sharply pointed, curved awns near the base of the bracteoles, but that falls off as the cone matures. The samaras are reddish brown and 3–4 mm (0.12–0.16 in) long.

== Taxonomy ==
This species was first formally described in 1876 by Ferdinand von Mueller who gave it the name Casuarina corniculata in his Fragmenta Phytographiae Australiae, from specimens collected near Mount Churchman by Jess Young. It was reclassified in 1982 as Allocasuarina campestris by Lawrie Johnson in the Journal of the Adelaide Botanic Gardens. The specific epithet (corniculata) means "with a small, hornlike appendage".

== Distribution and habitat ==
This sheoak grows in tall heath on sandplains between Wubin and Norseman in the Avon Wheatbelt, Coolgardie, Esperance Plains, Mallee and Murchison bioregions of south-western Western Australia.

== Conservation status ==
Allocasuarina corniculata is listed as "not threatened" by the Government of Western Australia Department of Biodiversity, Conservation and Attractions.
