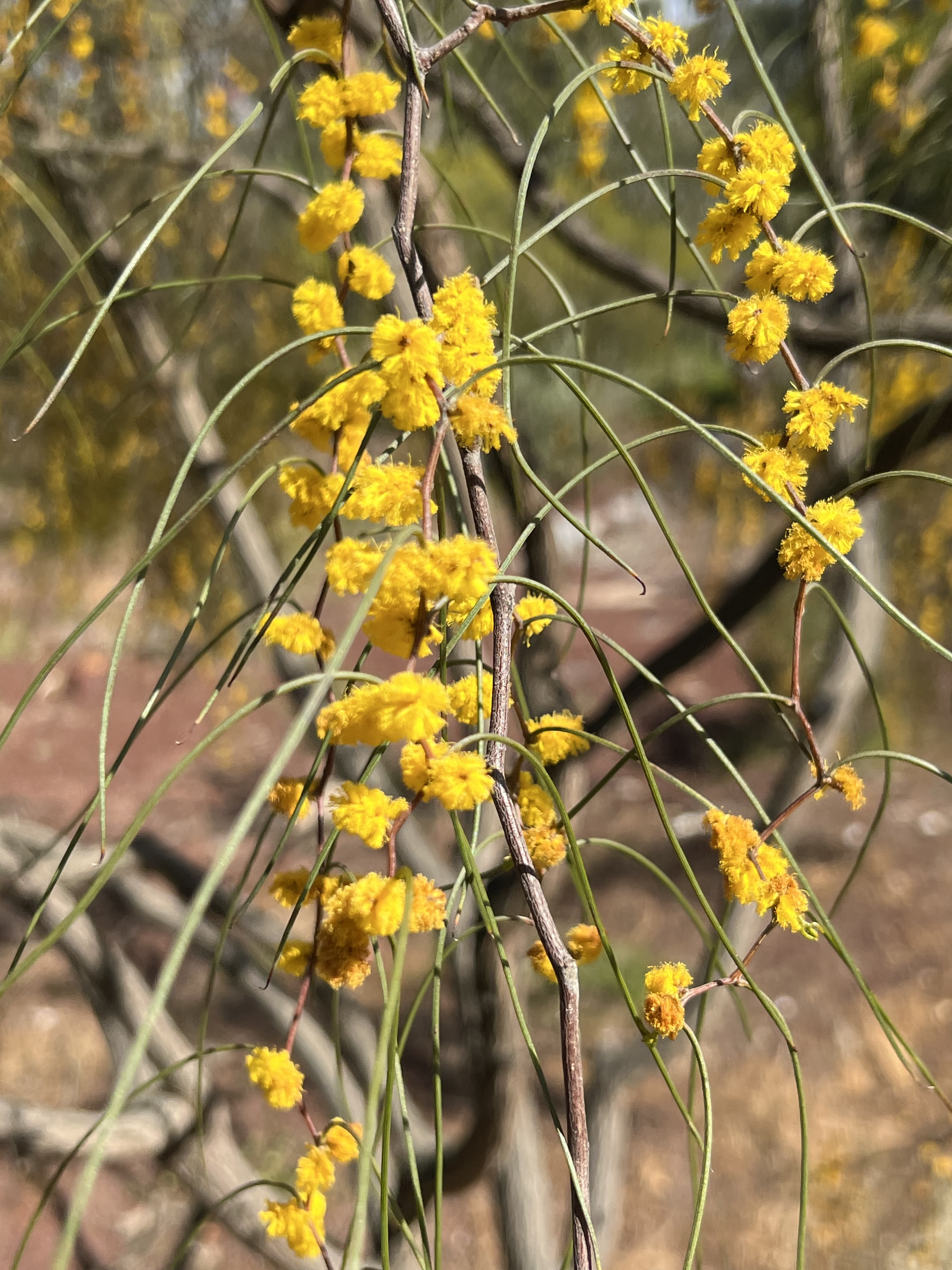

Scientific classification
- Kingdom: Plantae
- Clade: Tracheophytes
- Clade: Angiosperms
- Clade: Eudicots
- Clade: Rosids
- Order: Fabales
- Family: Fabaceae
- Subfamily: Caesalpinioideae
- Clade: Mimosoid clade
- Genus: Acacia
- Species: A. merinthophora

Binomial name
- Acacia merinthophora E.Pritz.
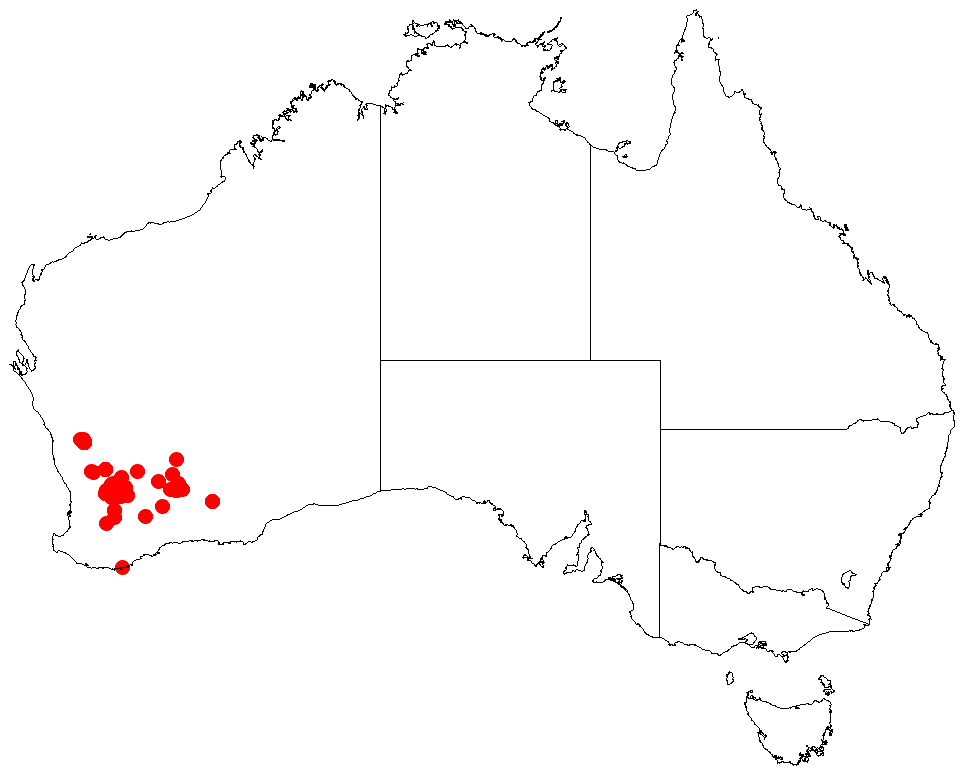
- Occurrence data from AVH

Synonyms
- Acacia hynesiana W.Fitzg.; Racosperma merinthophorum (E.Pritz.) Pedley

= Acacia merinthophora =

Zig-zag wattle

Species of legume

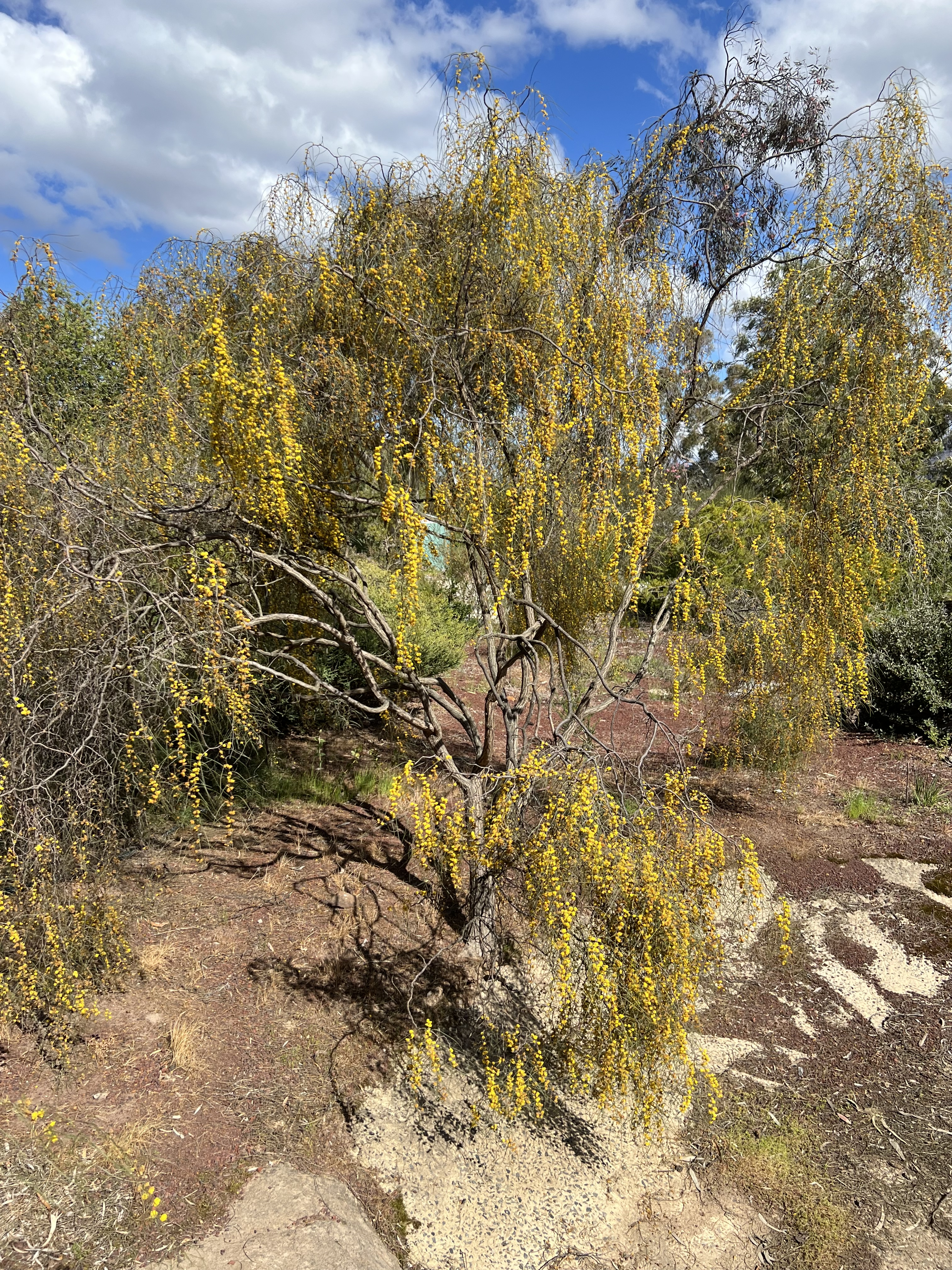
Habit

Acacia merinthophora, also known as zig-zag wattle, is a species of flowering plant in the family Fabaceae and is endemic to the south-west of Western Australia. It is an openly branched shrub or small tree, usually with pendulous, zig-zagged branchlets, sessile, curved phyllodes that are more or four-sided in cross section, oblong to shortly cylindrical heads of golden yellow flowers, and linear, firmly papery pods, more or less constricted between the seeds.

== Description ==
Acacia merinthophora is an openly branched shrub or small tree that typically grows to a height of up to 4 m (13 ft) and has pendulous, zig-zagged, ribbed branchlets with silky hairs between the ribs. Its phyllodes are sessile, strongly curved, four-sided in cross section, 70–250 mm (2.8–9.8 in) long, about 1 mm (0.039 in) wide, tapered at the tip, yellow-green and glabrous, with four veins separated by a fine furrow. The flowers are borne in up to three subsessile, oblong to shortly cylindrical heads in axils, each head 6–10 mm (0.24–0.39 in) long and 5–10 mm (0.20–0.39 in) in diameter with golden yellow flowers. Flowering occurs from May to September, and the pods are linear, more or less straight, up to 130 mm (5.1 in) long and 2.0–2.5 mm (0.079–0.098 in) wide, firmly papery and more or less constricted between the seeds. The seeds are oblong, 3–4 mm (0.12–0.16 in) long, mottled brown and cream with a dark brown line on the edge and a creamy yellow aril.

== Taxonomy ==
Acacia merinthophora was first formally described in 1904 by the Ernst Georg Pritzel in the journal Botanische Jahrbucher fur Systematik, Pflanzengeschichte und Pflanzengeographie from specimens he collected near Tammin. The specific epithet (merinthophora) is derived from the Greek words merinthos meaning 'cord or string' and phoreo meaning 'to carry or wear', referring to the long thin phyllodes.

== Distribution and habitat ==
Zig-zag wattle mostly grows in sand in tall shrubland from Cadoux to Bruce Rock, with disjunct occurrences at Perenjori and North Ironcap (75 km (47 mi) east of Hyden) in the Avon Wheatbelt, Coolgardie, Mallee and Swan Coastal Plain bioregions of south-western Western Australia.

== See also ==
- List of Acacia species
