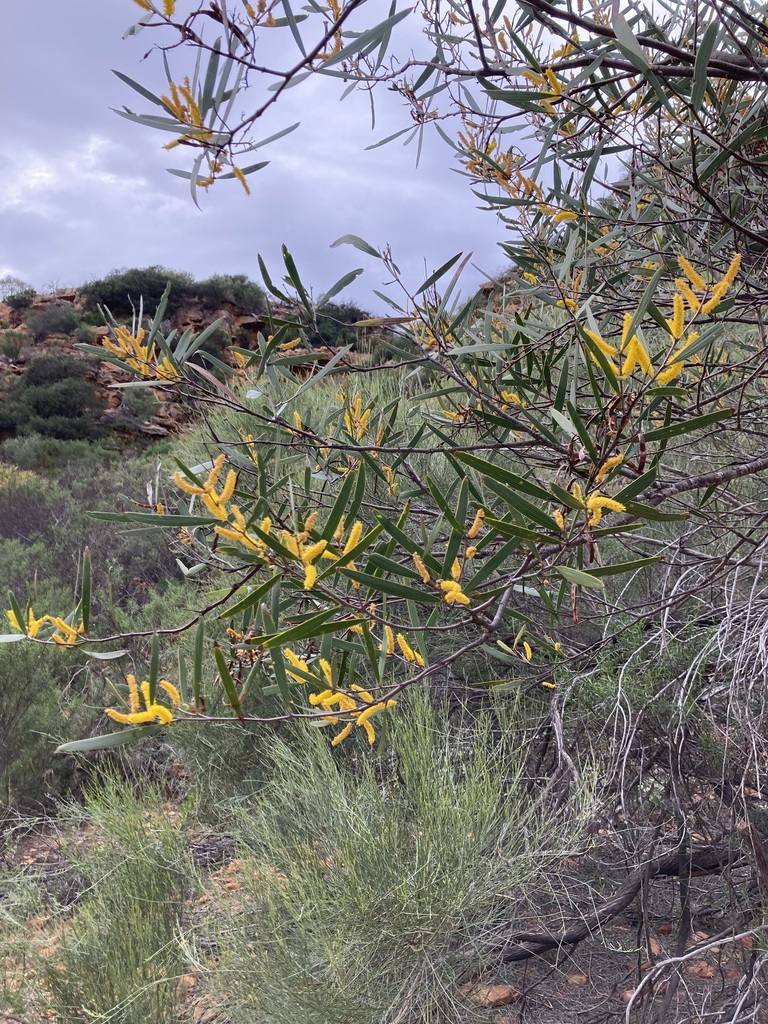
- Near Kalbarri

Scientific classification
- Kingdom: Plantae
- Clade: Tracheophytes
- Clade: Angiosperms
- Clade: Eudicots
- Clade: Rosids
- Order: Fabales
- Family: Fabaceae
- Subfamily: Caesalpinioideae
- Clade: Mimosoid clade
- Genus: Acacia
- Species: A. neurophylla

Binomial name
- Acacia neurophylla W.Fitzg.
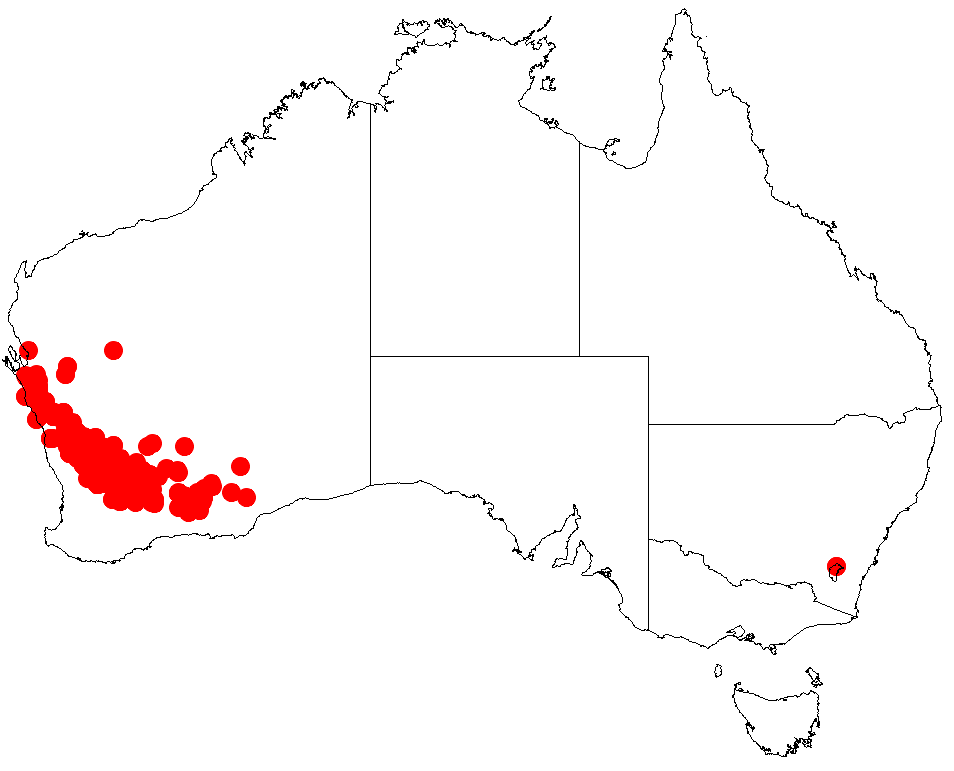
- Occurrence data from AVH

Synonyms
- Acacia neurophyllum Pedley orth. var.; Racosperma neurophyllum (W.Fitzg.) Pedley

= Acacia neurophylla =

Wodjil

Species of legume

Acacia neurophylla is a species of flowering plant in the family Fabaceae, and is endemic to the south-west of Western Australia. It is a shrub, sometimes a small tree, with glabrous more or less ribbed branchlets, erect, narrowly oblong phyllodes, spikes of golden yellow flowers and linear, thinly leathery pods strongly raised over the seeds.

== Description ==
Acacia neurophylla is an erect or low, spreading shrub or sometimes a small tree, that typically grows to a height of 0.5–5 m (1 ft 8 in – 16 ft 5 in) and has glabrous, more or less ribbed branchlets. Its phyllodes are erect, narrowly oblong, straight to slightly curved 45–185 mm (1.8–7.3 in) long, 3.5–13 mm (0.14–0.51 in) wide, rigid and occasionally sharply pointed, on a pulvinus 1–5 mm (0.039–0.197 in) long. The flowers are borne in two to four spikes in axils on peduncles up to 8 mm (0.31 in) long, the flowers are golden yellow and densely congested along the spikes. Flowering time depends on subspecies, and the pods are linear, up to 80 mm (3.1 in) long, 2.5–6 mm (0.098–0.236 in) wide, glabrous and thinly leathery. The seeds are broadly elliptic to egg-shaped or nearly circular, 2.5–3.5 mm (0.098–0.138 in) long, glossy dark brown or black with an aril near the end.

== Taxonomy ==
Acacia neurophylla was first formally described in 1904 by William Vincent Fitzgerald in the Journal of the West Australian Natural History Society from specimens he collected near Cunderdin in 1903. The specific epithet (neurophylla) means 'nerve-leaved'.

In 1995, Richard Cowan and Bruce Maslin described two subspecies of A. neurophylla and the names are accepted by the Australian Plant Census:

- Acacia neurophylla subsp. erugata R.S.Cowan & Maslin has a strongly wrinkled, cylindrical pulvinus that is scarsely flared at the base, phyllodes commonly 45–90 mm (1.8–3.5 in) long with a equally prominent veins, spikes 10–30 mm (0.39–1.18 in) long on peduncles up to 2 mm (0.079 in) long, and flowers from May to November, especially August and September.
- Acacia neurophylla W.Fitzg. subsp. neurophylla has a smooth, glabrous pulvinus that is strongly flared at the base, phyllodes commonly 100–185 mm (3.9–7.3 in) long with a central vein and two lateral veins more strongly raised, spikes 20–50 mm (0.79–1.97 in) long on peduncles mostly 3–5 mm (0.12–0.20 in) long, and flowers from July to September.

== Distribution and habitat ==
This species of wattle grows in sand, sandy loam and leterite on undulating plains, rises and granite outcrops in the Avon Wheatbelt, Coolgardie, Geraldton Sandplains, Mallee, Murchison and Yalgoo bioregions of south-western Western Australia.

- Subspecies erugata grows mainly in sand and laterite in scrub and shrubland from the Cooloomia Homestead, south-east to Kondinin and Bullabulling.
- Subspecies neurophylla grows in sand, laterite and sandy loam on undulating plains and rises near granite outcrops in disjunct populations from near Morawa and south-east to Cunderdin, with a southern variant that occurs in the Lake Johnston area and east to Norseman and Moir Rock.

== Conservation status ==
Both subspecies of Acacia neurophylla are listed as 'Not threatened' by the by the Government of Western Australia Department of Biodiversity, Conservation and Attractions.

== See also ==
- List of Acacia species
