= Wannamal, Western Australia =

Wannamal
- Town
- Coordinates: 31°10′00″S 116°03′00″E
- Country: Australia
- State: Western Australia
- LGA(s): Shire of Chittering
- Location: 115 km (71 mi) north north east of Perth; 26 km (16 mi) north east of Gingin; 70 km (43 mi) east of Lancelin
- Established: 1908

Government
  - State electorate(s): Moore
  - Federal division(s): Durack

Area
  - Total: 281 km^{2} (108 sq mi)
- Elevation: 173 m (568 ft)

Population
  - Total(s): 134 (SAL 2021)
- Postcode: 6505

Wannamal is a town in the Wheatbelt region of Western Australia.

The town's name is taken from the nearby Wannamal Lake, a name of Indigenous Australian origin that was first recorded in 1853. The word is thought to mean "lake".

Grazing leases were first taken in the area in the 1850s and by the 1870s a permanent settlement existed in the area. In 1892 the Midland railway line was extended as far as Wannamal and a siding was opened in the townsite in 1895. The townsite was gazetted in 1908.

Tenders for the erection of a public hall were called for in early 1912, with the building being completed and opened in December the same year.
