= James Venture Mulligan's Grave =

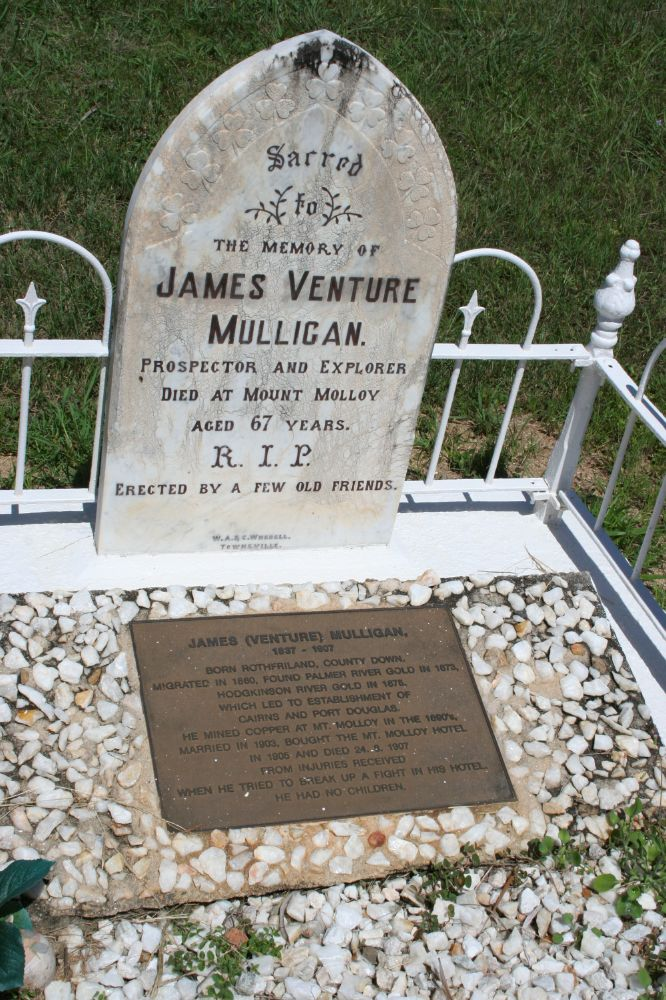
- James Venture Mulligan's Grave in Mount Molloy Cemetery, 2010

- Location within Queensland Location within Australia
- 16.6863°S 145.3251°E
- Location: Bakers Road, Mount Molloy, Shire of Mareeba, Queensland, Australia

History
- Design period: 1900–1914 (early 20th century)
- Built: 1907

Queensland Heritage Register
- Official name: James Venture Mulligan's Grave, Mt Molloy Cemetery
- Type: state heritage (landscape, built)
- Designated: 21 October 1992
- Reference no.: 600684
- Significant period: 1907– (social); 1907–1938 (historical); 1907 (fabric grave); 1907– (fabric cemetery)
- Significant components: grave surrounds/railings, grave marker, headstone, cemetery

James Venture Mulligan's Grave is a heritage-listed grave at Bakers Road, Mount Molloy, Shire of Mareeba, Queensland, Australia. It was built in 1907. It is also known as Mount Molloy Cemetery. It was added to the Queensland Heritage Register on 21 October 1992.

== History ==
Mount Molloy was established in 1880 after Patrick Molloy, a selector who had taken up land beside Rifle Creek on the Port Douglas to Herberton track, found rich copper deposits. Patrick Molloy attracted the interest of James Forsyth and James Venture Mulligan, who promoted the potential of the area to Melbourne investors. The investors, including the Victorian Premier, formed the Mount Molloy Copper Mining Company in 1899. The mine was taken over by John Moffatt's Irvinebank Company in 1901.

James Venture Mulligan was born in 1837 at County Down, Ireland, to a Protestant family who rented farming land in Slievenaboley. Sometime during 1859 or 1860 he travelled to Melbourne, Victoria. Details of his early years in Australia are not clear, but it is thought he unsuccessfully attempted to join the Burke and Wills expedition from Melbourne, then travelled to New South Wales, to Nundle, Glen Innes and Armidale, where he is thought to have opened a butcher's shop and first tried his hand at prospecting. Mulligan left Armidale for the Gympie goldrush in 1867, travelled to the Gladstone goldfield in 1871 and the Etheridge goldfield in 1873. He is also thought to have prospected at Ravenswood and the Gilbert River goldfields.

Mulligan led a party of six men from Gilbert River via Mount Surprise in 1873, to investigate a reported gold discovery by William Hann on the Palmer River. Days after Mulligan's expedition returned the following announcement was posted on the door of the Gold Commissioner at Etheridge:

"JV Mulligan reports the discovery of payable gold on the Palmer River. Those interested may inspect at this office the 102 oz he brought back."

On 26 September 1873 Mulligan led a large party of 100 diggers to the Palmer. The Palmer was to provide considerable stimulus for the development of North Queensland in the late nineteenth century. Mulligan prospected for a short time on the Palmer and also spent some time in the newly established port of Cooktown. On 1 May 1874 he left Cooktown for another prospecting expedition. On this expedition Mulligan named the St George River, sited the short lived town of Toughville and explored tributaries of the Palmer, Mitchell and Walsh Rivers, and what was to become the Hodgkinson goldfield. On 29 April 1875 he led a government-sponsored expedition which passed the future sites of Mareeba and Atherton, crossed the Herberton Range and discovered tin in the Wild River, but found little gold. The government paid Mulligan £300 to equip him for another expedition, to be raised to £1000 if he found substantial gold deposits.

On 23 October 1875 Mulligan led another expedition to the Hodgkinson. The party returned to Cooktown on 13 March 1876 with sufficient gold to stimulate the Hodgkinson gold rush. The Hodgkinson field was proclaimed in March or June 1876 and lasted until 1909 when it was incorporated into the Chillagoe Gold and Mineral field. Though geologically similar to the rich alluvial finds on the Palmer River, the Hodgkinson supported mainly reef mining, and disappointed miners blamed Mulligan for their misfortunes on the field.

In 1877 Mulligan settled at Thornborough and fostered business interests, such as the ownership of the Thornborough store with his old mate James Dowdall, and chairmanship of the local Progress Association. After the store was declared insolvent in 1879, Mulligan again turned to prospecting. He led another government sponsored expedition in 1882, prospecting at the Millstream, Wild River, Emu Creek near Irvinebank and Silver Valley. He led another three expeditions in 1883 in search of tin and gold deposits, to the Valley of Lagoons, Chillagoe and the Palmer/Laura region. Widely respected for his bush skills and religious principles, Mulligan became a justice of the peace in 1894. In 1903, aged in his early 60's, Mulligan married Fanny Bulls, a widower from the Palmer goldfield, and they settled in Mount Molloy, then a bustling "twin town" with one township close to the copper mines and another servicing John Moffat's smelters where the town of Mount Molloy stands today. It is thought that while living in Mount Molloy Mulligan continued prospecting on Mount Fraser, a few miles north west of the town.

The details about the events that led to Mulligan's death are unclear. It seems that on 23 August 1907 Mulligan was involved in a pub brawl, in which he sustained critical injuries. Conflicting accounts of the fight place it in Jimmy Forsyth's pub midway between the two towns, now marked by a large mango tree on the left of Bakers Road, or as reported in the Cairns Morning Post on 27 August 1907, at Mount Carbine, north of Mount Molloy. He was taken to Mount Molloy hospital and died the next day. The Cairns Morning Post records Mulligan was buried "in the little cemetery at Mount Molloy" the Saturday following his death. The Cairns Post suggested opening a subscription list for a memorial in honour of Mulligan. Local residents erected a marble headstone, made in Townsville, over his grave, which identifies Mulligan as 67 when he died (in fact he was 70) with the words "erected by a few old friends".

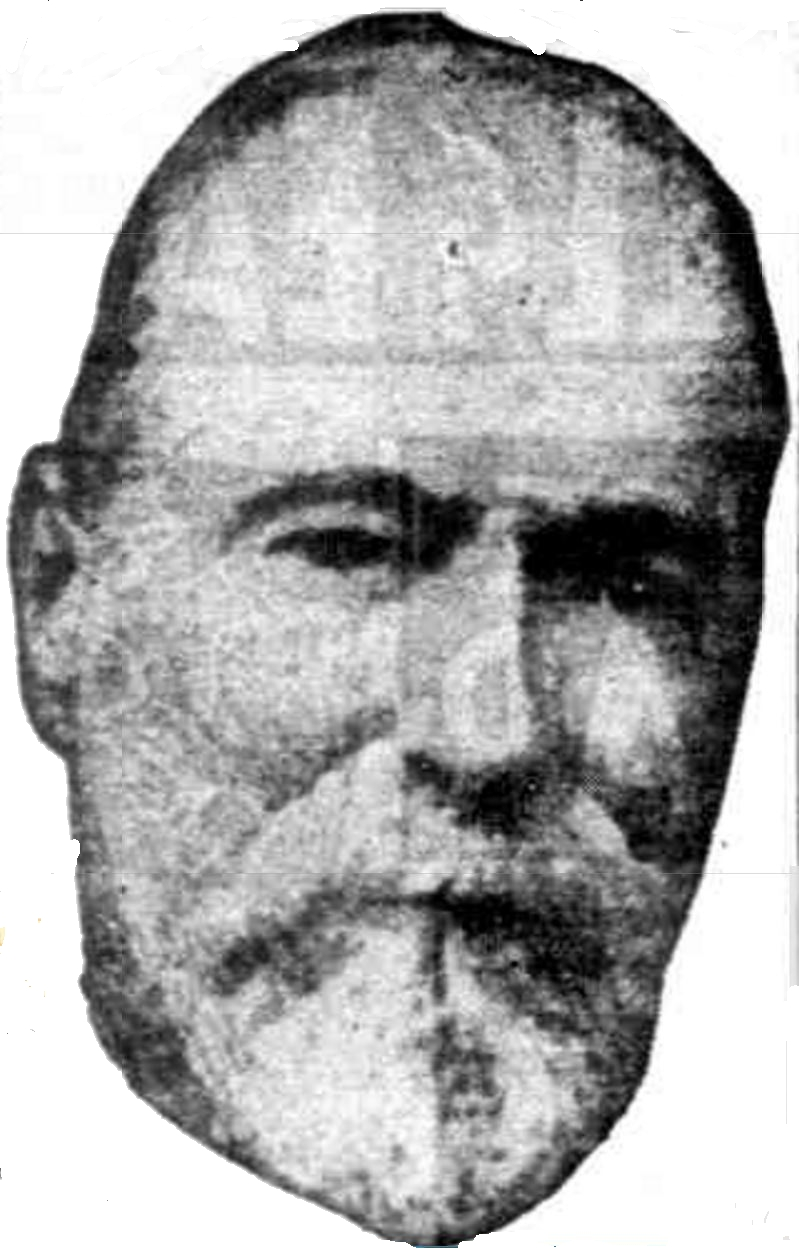
James Venture Mulligan

Mulligan enjoyed exploration as much as prospecting and was never secretive about his finds. His lively diaries, published regularly in The Queenslander were re-published in 1875 as "A guide to the Palmer River and Normanby goldfields". Mount Mulligan, a plaque at Mareeba, and the Mulligan Highway commemorate his name.

Mulligan maintained an association with Mount Molloy throughout its development, having led the first prospecting expedition through the area and later acquiring the copper mining claim in partnership with James Forsyth. This claim was then sold to a Melbourne syndicate and eventually operated by mining magnate, John Moffat. After initial mismanagement it had, by 1903, become one of North Queensland's leading copper producers.

Mulligan has the earliest marked grave in the Mount Molloy cemetery, followed by William James Cairn in 1908 and James Laing in 1909. Another seven marked graves, members of the George, McDonach, Campbell and Geraghty families, date to between 1924 and 1938. The cemetery continues to serve the Mount Molloy community and presently contains around 70 marked burials.

The site has ongoing significance to the community as evidenced by the placement of a bronze plaque and other commemorative activities at the plot.

== Description ==
James Venture Mulligan is buried in the Mount Molloy cemetery, Bakers Road, Mount Molloy, 2.6 kilometres (1.6 mi) from Mount Molloy by road. A low cyclone fence, with three gated entrances, surrounds the cemetery. One entrance is for visitors on foot coming from the northern or road side, one for vehicles also from the north, and another for visitors on foot coming from the west.

The landform is open woodland slightly sloping towards the south-east. The ground appears hard and stony and little grass cover was evident at the time of inspection in October 2003. Tree species do not appear to be part of an overall planting scheme, and include species of Acacia, Melaleuca, Eucalypt and Grevillea. One frangipani and three palms have been planted in direct association with a recent grave. Termite mounds are evident across the cemetery.

Mulligan's grave is at the south-east corner of the cemetery, near a mature grevillea tree. It is marked with a marble headstone, made by W.A. & C. Whelan in Townsville and surrounded by a concrete border and cast iron fence. The fence is attached to the concrete with bolts. Both the fence and the concrete border are painted white. A bronze plaque, embedded in concrete and surrounded by white quartz pebbles, sits below the headstone. Loose white quartz pebbles are inside the concrete edging.

Other graves in the cemetery are constructed of materials such as marble, granite, concrete, tiling and cast iron.

== Heritage listing ==
James Venture Mulligan's Grave in the Mount Molloy Cemetery was listed on the Queensland Heritage Register on 21 October 1992 having satisfied the following criteria.

The place is important in demonstrating the evolution or pattern of Queensland's history.

Mount Molloy cemetery, in use from at least 1907, reflects the development of the region from that period to the present day. The cemetery is an important record of the cultural development of the area, representing the development of early mining activities and the subsequent decline in economic activity.

The place has a special association with the life or work of a particular person, group or organisation of importance in Queensland's history.

James Venture Mulligan was closely associated with the discovery and opening of the Palmer goldfields, which was to provide considerable stimulus for the development of North Queensland in the late nineteenth century. Mulligan is also credited with the development of the Hodgkinson goldfield and is recognised for locating a number of potential mineral developments in North Queensland.

In addition to his published writings, JV Mulligan is remembered through the naming of Mt Mulligan and the Mulligan Highway. James Venture Mulligan's grave is the most direct and tangible reminder of the man and his life with its long associations with the mining history of North Queensland.
