= Southedge =

- Suburb
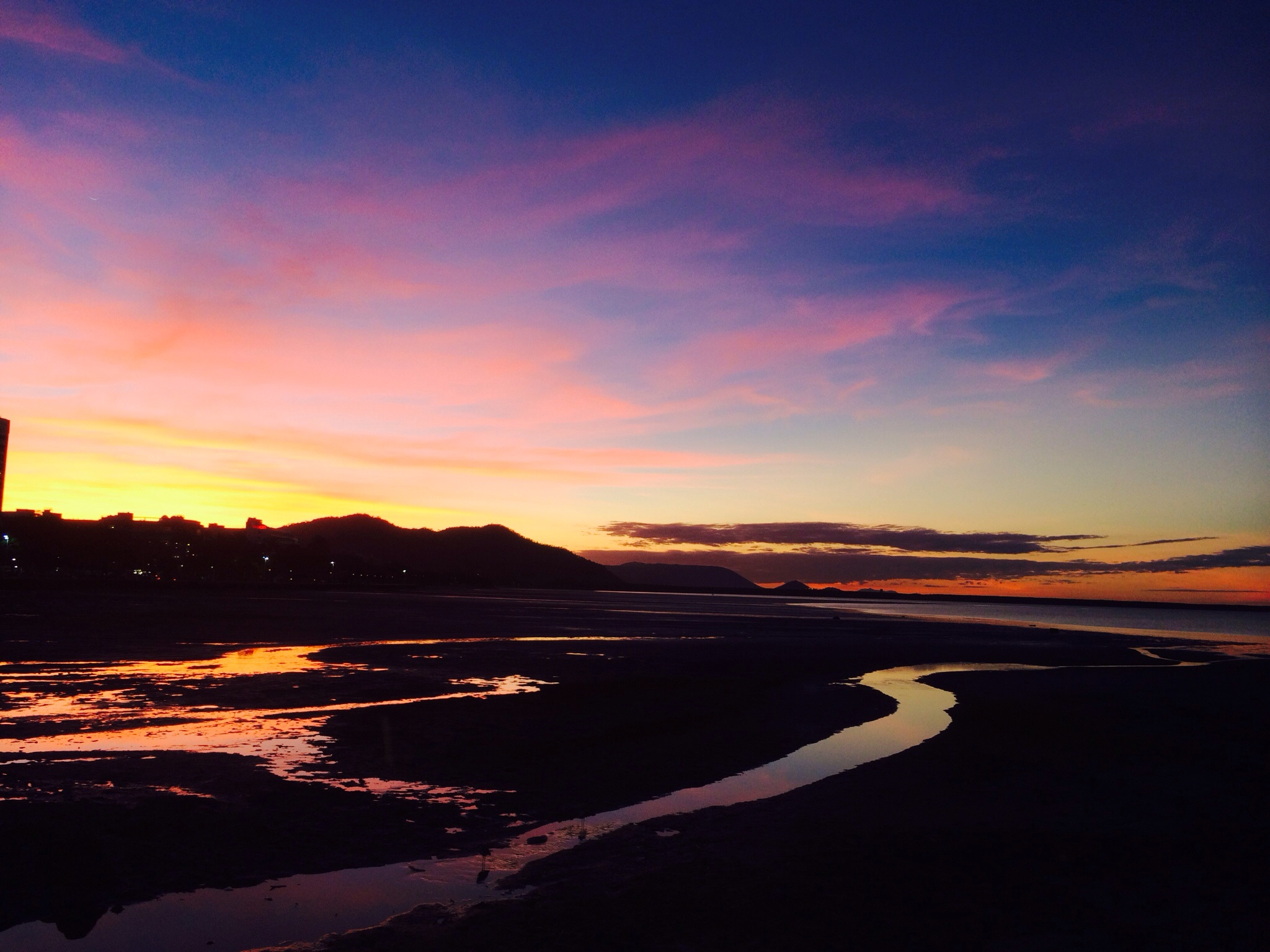
- Sunset over Southedge

- Interactive map of Southedge
- Coordinates: 16.7563°S 145.2752°E
- Country: Australia
- State: Queensland
- LGA: Shire of Mareeba
- Location: 31.3 km (19.4 mi) N of Mareeba; 47.6 km (29.6 mi) S of Mossman; 93.6 km (58.2 mi) NW of Cairns; 1,772 km (1,101 mi) NNW of Brisbane

Government
  - State electorate: Cook
  - Federal division: Kennedy

Area
  - Total: 529.5 km^{2} (204.4 sq mi)

Population
  - Total: 21 (2021 census)
  - Density: 0.0397/km^{2} (0.1027/sq mi)
- Time zone: UTC+10:00 (AEST)
- Postcode: 4871
Suburbs around Southedge
Mount Carbine	Mount Carbine	Mount Molloy
Mount Mulligan	Southedge	Mount Molloy
Paddys Green	Paddys Green	Biboohra

Southedge is a rural locality in the Shire of Mareeba, Queensland, Australia. In the 2021 census, Southedge had a population of 21 people.

== Geography ==
The Great Dividing Range loosely forms the south-eastern boundary of the locality. The locality is within the Gulf of Carpentaria drainage basin and specifically within the catchment of the Mitchell River.

The major road thoroughfare in Southedge is the Mulligan Highway, which enters the locality from the east (Mount Molloy) and exits to the south-east (Biboohra).

The Southedge-Wangetti Road, also known as Quaid Road or Southedge Road, was completed with Queensland Government approval, but currently has no public access linking Wangetti to Southedge. The Wet Tropics Management Authority controls access to sections of the road, that would otherwise be trafficable from the Mulligan Highway to the Captain Cook Highway and to Kuranda through the Black Mountain Road. A decision was made in 1988 that the road was not compatible with the World Heritage status of the Wet Tropics.

The Mitchell River enters the locality from the south-east (Biboohra) and exits to the north-west (the locality of Mount Carbine). The Southedge Dam, also known as the Lake Mitchell Dam, is an earth-filled embankment dam across the Mitchell River within Southedge (16.77823°S 145.30614°E), creating Lake Mitchell (16.8166°S 145.3500°E).

Southedge has the following mountains and passes (from north to south):

- Mount Holmes (16.6424°S 145.1458°E) 648 metres (2,126 ft)
- Round Mountain (16.7350°S 145.2162°E) 387 metres (1,270 ft)
- Mount Consider (16.7687°S 145.3552°E) 640 metres (2,100 ft)
- Sheas Gap (16.8022°S 145.2785°E)
- Round Mountain (16.8169°S 145.2698°E) 494 metres (1,621 ft)

The land use is grazing on native vegetation.

== Demographics ==
In the 2016 census, Southedge had a population of 21 people.

In the 2021 census, Southedge had a population of 21 people.

== Education ==
There are no schools in Southedge. The nearest government primary schools are Mount Molloy State School in neighbouring Mount Molloy to the north-east and Biboohra State School in neighbouring Bioohra to the south-east. The nearest government secondary schools are Mossman State High School in Mossman to the north, Kuranda District State College in Kuranda to the east, and Mareeba State High School in Mareeba to the south.

There are also Catholic primary schools in Mossman and Mareeba, a Catholic secondary school in Mareeba, and a primary-and-secondary Steiner school in Kuranda.

However students in the south and west of the locality may be too distant to attend any of these schools; the alternatives are distance education and boarding school.
