= Johnston's Sawmill Steam Plant =

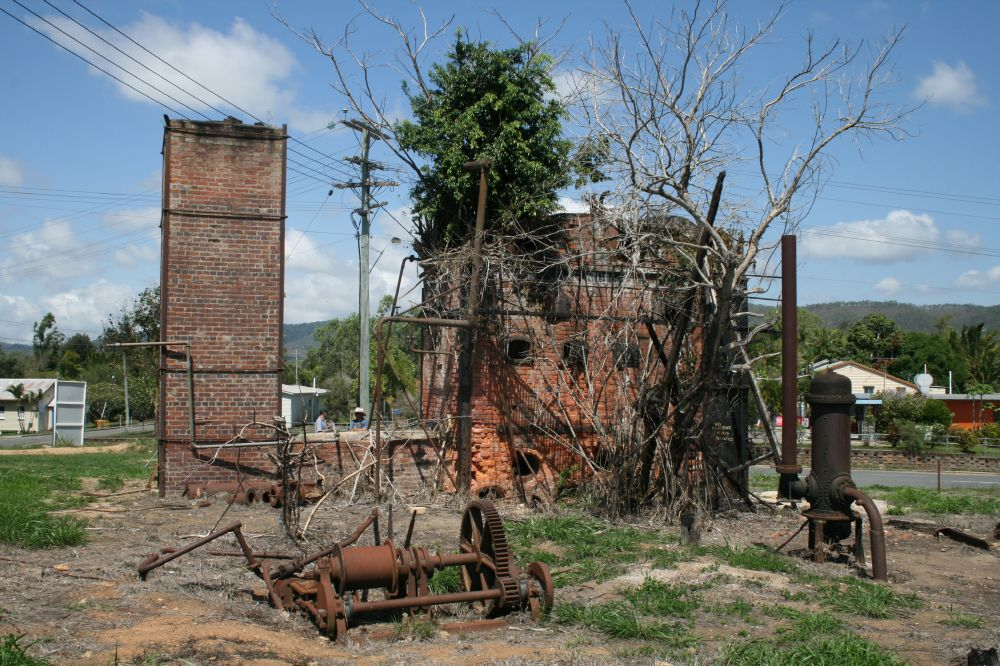
- Johnston's Sawmill Steam Plant, 2009

- Location within Queensland Location within Australia
- 16.676°S 145.3299°E
- Location: corner of Santowski Crescent and the Peninsular Development Road, Mount Molloy, Shire of Mareeba, Queensland, Australia

History
- Design period: 1919–1930s (interwar period)
- Built: 1914–1954

Queensland Heritage Register
- Official name: JM Johnston's Sawmill (former) Steam Plant
- Type: state heritage (built)
- Designated: 15 July 2011
- Reference no.: 602776
- Significant period: 1914–1963
- Significant components: boiler room/boiler house, machinery/plant/equipment – forestry/timber industry

Johnston's Sawmill Steam Plant is a heritage-listed former sawmill at corner of Santowski Crescent and the Peninsular Development Road, Mount Molloy, Shire of Mareeba, Queensland, Australia. It was built in 1914 and operated until 1963 when it burned down for the last time. It was added to the Queensland Heritage Register on 15 July 2011.

== History ==
The former John Michael Johnston's Sawmill Steam Plant, comprising a brick-encased Stirling water tube boiler with flue and chimney base, Marshall steam engine, Walkers steam winch and boiler blow down tank is located in a prominent position at the corner of Santowski Crescent and the Peninsular Developmental Road (Mulligan Highway) in Mount Molloy. A small sawmill owned by the Mount Molloy Copper Mining Company appears to have operated on the site c.1908, and JM Johnston's larger sawmill was operational between 1914 and 1963.

The township of Mount Molloy was initially called "Smelter Town", one of two settlements that grew up around a copper mine and its related copper smelter built near Rifle Creek, northwest of the mine. Copper had been discovered in 1885, either by teamster Pat Molloy or by Dan Cuddihy, one of his bullock drivers. Molloy worked the lode intermittently, making about £500 before he abandoned or sold the mine, which was taken up by successful prospector James Venture Mulligan and businessman James Forsythe in the early 1890s. Mulligan and Forsythe made about £3000 from the ore before attracting the attention of a Melbourne syndicate, which purchased the mine in 1898 for £6000. The company failed to find payable copper ore, the mine was abandoned and the mining lease forfeited. Forsythe regained possession of the mine, which he soon sold to JS Reid. It became part of John Moffat's holdings in 1901. Between 1880 and 1914, much of the economic activity of North Queensland was driven by the railways and mining towns created by John Moffat's enterprises, and his Chillagoe Company built private railways between Mareeba and Chillagoe during 1898–1901, and from Almaden to Forsayth during 1907–1910.

To avoid carting ore from Mount Molloy to the government railway at Biboohra (the railway had reached Biboohra from Cairns in 1893), a smelter was built near Rifle Creek at Mount Molloy. The smelter manager's residence was located on the hill just above the smelter, which commenced operations on 25 November 1904. A small sawmill existed on the flat north-west of the smelter by early 1905, to produce timber for mine shaft supports and buildings. A two-foot gauge tramway linking the mine and the smelter was also completed by 1905 - the peak year for copper production at Mount Molloy. At this time the Mount Molloy Copper Mining Company Limited was floated, with John Moffat as Chairman.

As the smelted copper matte still needed carting by road to Biboohra and copper prices were high in 1906, Mount Molloy Ltd started constructing a 19-mile-65-chain (31.9 km) private railway from Biboohra to the Mount Molloy smelter in 1907. However, the expense of this railway, combined with a slump in copper prices in late 1907, meant that by the time the railway opened on 7 August 1908 the company was already in financial trouble. The smelter had suspended operations while waiting for the railway to be completed, and a short smelting campaign was conducted in late 1908.

Although mining operations were no longer profitable in Mount Molloy, an alternative source of income existed in timber. The rise of sawmilling in the Cairns region was part of the evolution of the industry in Queensland over time. Although there was timbergetting in the far north from the 1870s, South East Queensland's (especially Maryborough's) sawmills supplied a substantial portion of central and north Queensland's sawn timber needs until sawmilling in the Cairns district from the 1880s reduced dependence on the south. By 1888 there were three sawmills in the Cairns district, including the Union Saw and Planing Mills at Stratford (E Martin and Son), and a steam powered sawmill was also established at Carrington in 1889.

The first steam powered sawmill in Queensland had opened in Brisbane in 1853 and prior to World War II most sawmills on the Atherton Tablelands used steam engines. A reliable source of water was required for the steam boilers which powered the engines, and the latter were commonly equipped with a large flywheel, as the energy stored in the flywheel enabled the saws to make major cuts with a minimum loss of speed. Power was transferred to the saws via belts, pulleys and shafts. However, most machinery was sold, relocated and reused when a sawmill closed, leading to paucity of relics at most sawmill sites.

The fact that Mount Molloy Ltd was building a railway towards a timber source made the company's shift to timber viable, as logs could be efficiently transported to sawmills located along the railway network. The Queensland sawmilling industry was initially located in major towns, close to the markets for sawn timber. As the industry evolved there was a tendency to locate mills near the resource only if there were sufficient supplies to last during the life of the investment. Sawmills were also initially sited by rivers and creeks, where logs could be rafted or moved by ship, but when railways were established, sawmills were sited on or near the railway.

The spread of railways in the Cairns region thus facilitated the timber industry. The Tablelands railway reached Mareeba from Cairns in 1893 and Atherton in 1903, enabling Tableland timber to be transported to the coast, and railway extensions over the next two decades made the Cairns region the main sawmilling district outside South East Queensland. Major sawmilling enterprises in the Far North region included Cairns Timber Limited, Lawson and Sons, and JM Johnston.

The timber industry was accompanied by closer settlement, as farming usually commenced after land was cleared by logging; although before the 1884 Crown Land Act introduced royalties on timber, it was easy for timbergetters to select land, extract the timber and then forfeit the selection. The forestry industry was second only to mining as a cause of settlement in Far North Queensland. In Mount Molloy, the dairy farming that followed timber extraction enabled the town to survive the failure of mining.

Due to Mount Molloy Ltd's new found interest in the timber industry, in December 1907 Anthony Linedale, one of the directors of the company, corresponded with the Director of Forests, Queensland Department of Public Lands, about the activities of Mount Molloy Ltd and its timber requirements. He noted that the company employed 173 men at the mine, 124 men at the smelters and refiners, 17 officers, 18 teamsters, 10 wood-getters, 19 men at the Biboohra railway yard and 320 men building the Molloy railway. That month the Director of Forests recommended that 10,000,000 superficial feet (1 super foot is a volume of timber representing 2,360 cubic centimetres (144 cu in) be sold without competition to Mount Molloy Ltd, over 5 years, with a minimum removal of 30,000 super feet per month; the royalty to be a 25 per cent advance on the minimum royalties prescribed by the timber regulations for that district. The timber concession covered 16,000 acres (6,500 ha) of Crown land north of Mount Molloy. On 6 March 1908 an agreement on the concession was made between Mount Molloy Ltd and Alexander Patrick Cameron, Land Commissioner for the district of Cairns, with royalties to be paid each month from June 1908. One condition, which Mount Molloy Ltd later regretted, was that all timber cut had to be sawn within Queensland. The inability to export logs later led to kauri logs being stockpiled at Mount Molloy.

However, the right to cut timber meant that the new railway at least had something to transport, as the smelters had closed by the end of 1908 for lack of ore, and the mine itself closed in late 1910. The 5 year timber concession allowed Mount Molloy Ltd to stay afloat, and in the company's report for the half year to 31 December 1908, presented in April 1909, it was stated that contract teamsters were hauling timber from the company's concession. In addition, a bullock team, two horse teams and a traction engine were under company control. The timber extracted included hickory, cadagi, kauri pine, and red cedar; over 2 million super feet of logs were delivered to the depot, while 882,574 super feet were despatched by rail during the half year.

The report also noted that the Rifle sawmill (probably the small sawmill near the smelter) had been working intermittently on local orders. As it was not located on the railway, it was not suitable for cutting accumulated stock. A sleeper mill (for producing railway sleepers) had also been put down "on a branch line of 10 chains (660 ft; 200 m), leaving the main line near the western point of the triangle, and traversing the south easterly end of the Works Site Ridge". As the turning triangle (and the town's first railway station) was once located just east of Vains Close in Mount Molloy, and a 1914 survey map shows a siding running to the site of Johnston's sawmill, the sleeper mill was probably located where Johnston built his sawmill.

It was also reported in April 1909 that the company had acquired the Granite sawmill at Mareeba, with the plant taken on lease for one year, with the option of purchase or an extended lease of 4 years or more. According to the company's next half-yearly report (presented October 1909), the Mareeba sawmill drew nearly all its log supplies from Mount Molloy.

As timber felling and sawmilling had provided the capital to continue the company's mining operation, the approaching end of Mount Molloy Ltd's 5 year timber concession meant that the company went into liquidation on 3 March 1913. Despite the expiry of the original timber concession the liquidators (including John Moffat from December 1915) were allowed to continue cutting timber (excluding cedar) from December 1913, up to the 10 million super feet agreed to in 1908, or until the government purchased the railway to Mount Molloy.

A government purchase of the railway from Biboohra to Mount Molloy had been looming for some time. In 1910 Moffat had approached the Queensland Government, asking for £40,000 (the line had cost about £46,600); and in late March 1913, a deputation of Mount Molloy locals to the Railway Commissioner pointed out that if the line was torn up as a result of the company's liquidation, it would be disastrous for those who had already settled in the vicinity. In the end, Moffat received £17,500, the government taking over the line on 1 March 1917 under the Mount Molloy Railway Act 1917. At this time the extension on the timber concession ended. The government also took over the Chillagoe Company and its assets in June 1919.

Although Mount Molloy Ltd had failed, another enterprise based on timber saved Mount Molloy from extinction. John Michael Johnston, born in Reykjavik, Iceland in 1884, had worked in sawmills in Northern Europe, Canada and New Zealand before he moved to North Queensland. After a period of prospecting, he returned to sawmilling, first at Innisfail, then Tolga, before going into business on his own behalf at Ravenshoe. On 15 January 1914 the Cairns Post announced that Messrs Polentz and Johnson (sic-Johnston) had purchased the Mount Molloy sawmills, and intended "to start operations shortly". Advertisements later that year for the Mount Molloy Saw and Planing Mills of Johnston and Polentz noted that sawn hickory was their speciality. Some years later it was reported that Johnston had taken over what remained of the sawmill machinery in the town and had renovated it.

As the sawmill was only very small when Johnston took it over, the surviving boiler and steam engine equipment at the site of Johnston's sawmill was probably installed between 1914 and 1938. A photograph from c. 1938 shows that the surviving equipment was already in place: the Marshall steam engine and boiler were under separate open-sided sheds, the boiler's brickwork was painted white, and the Walkers steam winch was operating a stiff leg derrick crane. At this time the brick chimney base was shorter and located closer to the boiler. The chimney appears to have been in its current position by 1954.

The Marshall steam engine was the main driving engine for the saws in the mill, running a flat belt from its flywheel. It, along with the other steam engines in the mill, was powered by the Stirling boiler, which was fed with timber off cuts. The Stirling boiler was a water- tube boiler, in which the water to be heated was contained within tubes, with fire passing around the outside-in contrast to fire-tube boilers, which had fire passing through tubes which were surrounded by water. The water-tube type was favoured for larger boilers for safety reasons. Stirling water tube boilers were at their most popular in the early 1900s; many of the 30 or so installed in Victoria between 1904 and 1912 were large boilers for electrical power generation or larger manufacturers. Most activity regarding Stirling boiler installation in Queensland, based on newspaper advertising, appears to be between 1900 and 1914, and the Agent for Queensland in 1903 was Norman M Bell.

The Mount Molloy boiler is of the "W" type, with three steam drums at the top and two water drums at the bottom, joined by tubes. However, the additional steam drum at the top is not a standard feature; nor is the metal furnace area at the front. The additional steam drum was un-fired (not directly connected to the steam-raising part of the boiler), so the boiler could still be considered to be of the five-drum type; the extra drum may have been necessary to maximise steam to the engine while a cut was being made along a log. The boiler's dimensions are 8 feet 10 inches (2.69 m) wide; 20 feet 11 inches (6.38 m) long and 19 feet (5.8 m) tall. This corresponds with the Stirling boiler size 1W.

In September 1916 the Cairns Post reported that Johnston had his new hardwood mill going, and that sawn timber was being despatched on the railway. In 1917 the paper reported that the sawmill was the "mainstay of the place [Mount Molloy] as regards employment". However, logs could not be hauled to the sawmill in the wet season, and a railway extension to the north was required to keep the mill working all year. By late 1917 two sawmills were operating in the district, cutting timber from Crown lands. The second sawmill was probably also Johnston's, as it was reported in May 1918 that he had a sawmill 8 miles (13 km) from Mount Molloy, on the edge of the scrub.

In 1920 the government began a 7-mile extension of the railway to the north, to facilitate further timber felling and closer settlement (the land north of Mount Molloy being better quality than that between Biboohra and Mount Molloy). A new railway station was built at Mount Molloy, to the north-east of the old station, and the old line towards the smelter site was left as a spur line for the use of Johnston's sawmill. The railway was opened to Rumula in December 1926, but it was never extended to Port Douglas, as some settlers had hoped. This could have provided an alternative route to the coast if the Kuranda section of the Tablelands railway was again blocked, as it had been in early 1911.

By March 1930 Johnston's sawmill ran 12 months of the year and enjoyed "practically a monopoly" in the supply of butter boxes and fruit cases in the north of Queensland. Johnston added to the Mount Molloy sawmill up to 1926, around which time he moved to Stratford, where he had built another sawmill in 1921. In the late 1920s the workforce at the Mount Molloy sawmill dropped from about 100 men to 60.

After Johnston moved to Stratford, WJ Colley became the manager at Mount Molloy and he purchased three trucks and several caterpillar tractors for use in the bush. This may have offended somebody, as on the early morning of 17 September 1930 the front end of one 5-long-ton (5.1 t) timber-hauling Benz Mercedes lorry was blown apart with explosives, damaging nearby houses.

In 1931 the Minister for Lands, William Deacon, visited Mount Molloy and expressed surprise at finding such an up-to-date sawmill situated behind the poor land that lay between Biboohra and Mount Molloy. However, early on 14 June 1932 a fire near the boiler spread away from the engine and main block, damaging the repair workshop at the mill. In August 1932 the mill employees were notified that their jobs were terminated, and that they had to apply to Mr WJ Colley to be re-engaged. A new private company, Molloy Sawmills Pty Limited, was registered under the directorship of JM Johnston, W Marlay and WJ Colley. Johnston still owned the mill, but leading employees were given a share in the business so they would have an incentive to look after its interests.

Johnston was still the owner of the Mount Molloy sawmill when it burnt down on 31 January 1934, William J Santowski being the manager at the time. It was reported that "One 350 h.p. boiler was in the destroyed building, also one Sandycroft steam engine; one twin circular log breaking down plant, four saw benches, one planing machine, saw-dust carriers, belting, shafting and pulleys and other tools of various descriptions, 29 circular saws, one log rolling winch, two saw sharpening machines, three cross-cut sawing machines". However, the employees were able to protect the boiler, main engines and pumping plant from serious damage. There were also two other planing machines in a separate building that was not destroyed. Prior to the fire Johnston had purchased machinery for a new sawmill at Shipton's Flat near Cooktown, and after the fire he placed some of the machinery at Mount Molloy. He claimed that the latter was a paying proposition and a very essential part of his organisation. It was also essential to have the mill at Mount Molloy, as most hardwood supplies came from there.

Yet another fire occurred on the night of 12 September 1938, in the planing building. As a result, Johnston used the planing facilities at his Stratford sawmill until the sawmill at Mount Molloy was repaired. After Johnston died in Cairns on 1 May 1943, it was stated that he was "one of the best known men in north Queensland". After his first sawmill at Ravenshoe, he had developed a string of Johnston mills, including at Mount Molloy, Stratford, Mareeba, Millaa Millaa, Bloomfield River and Shipton's Flat.

Bunning Bros purchased Johnson's Stratford and Mount Molloy mills in the late 1940s or early 1950s (although a 1991 Deed of Grant for the land on which the sawmill steam plant stands was made out to JM Johnston Pty Ltd) and Rankine Bros purchased the Mount Molloy sawmill in the early 1960s. Electricity from the grid had arrived at Mount Molloy in 1956, and from 1968 to 1986 Rankine Bros operated an electric sawmill at Mount Molloy, close to Johnston's original sawmill site. In 1988 the World Heritage Listing of the Wet Tropics area between Townsville and Cooktown terminated logging on Crown land, forcing timber workers to seek alternative forms of employment. The electric sawmill, minus its machinery, still stood in early 2011, along with a small office building which may have been relocated from elsewhere on the old Johnston sawmill site (both outside the heritage boundary).

A final fire destroyed Johnston's sawmill in 1963, and this time it was not rebuilt. The railway to Mount Molloy closed on 30 April the following year. In 1973 a timber shed still existed around the boiler, along with a small shed over the Walkers steam winch, and the derrick crane was still extant. Another shed existed to the southeast of the steam engine, set at a lower level. The buildings and the crane have since been removed. Two other steam engines that were present in 1973 are no longer on site - a Tangye, Birmingham single cylinder vertical engine and a Thompson & Co., Castlemaine, Victoria, single cylinder horizontal engine no.242 (earlier used by Mount Lyell Mining and Railway Company). A Pickering type governor was also present in 1973 on top of the Marshall steam engine, but this has since been removed.

Although Johnston's Mount Molloy sawmill buildings no longer exist, the sawmill's steam plant survives as a highly visible and evocative reminder of the time when the timber industry was a mainstay of the North Queensland economy.

== Description ==
The remnant steam plant from JM Johnston's sawmill is located at the southern entrance to Mount Molloy on the corner of Santowski Crescent and the Peninsular Developmental Road (Mulligan Highway), on a grassed site above the road level. The land rises to the west and falls away to the south.

The Stirling water tube boiler is the largest component of the steam plant, located at the northeast side of the group of objects, nearest the street intersection. The boiler's surrounds and the flue and chimney are made with brick, with metal framing. It is a "W" type boiler, with three metal steam drums at the top and two metal water drums at the bottom, joined by metal tubing; plus an extra steam drum on top. The top drums are supported on the metal frame, while the bottom two drums are free to move with expansion of the tubes. The maker's name is cast onto the metal access doors to the tubing: "The Stirling Boiler Co Ltd, Edinburgh & London". The furnace doors are located at the southeast end of the boiler, while the brick flue and chimney base are located at the northwest end. The main steam pipe is still extant. Vegetation is currently growing out of the boiler's brickwork.

The metal blowdown tank, a cylindrical device with a vent pipe, is connected to the boiler, located about 7 metres (23 ft) west of the southernmost corner of the boiler. The blowdown tank was used to flush sediment out of the boiler under pressure, by allowing the steam to flash off up the vent pipe while the hot water drained away.

About 7.6 metres (25 ft) south-west of the boiler, to the west of the blowdown tank, is a Walkers Ltd (Maryborough) steam winch, which was used to power a stiff leg derrick crane for moving logs. The winch is a twin- cylinder horizontal reversing single-drum second-motion steam winch; its steam cylinders are 8 inches (200 mm) in diameter, and the stroke is 14 inches (360 mm).

About 7.6 metres (25 ft) south of the boiler is the Marshall steam engine. There is no manufacturer's name on the engine, but it has the characteristics of a Marshall, Sons & Co. (Gainsborough, England) engine, specifically their class C model, which was fitted with a Hartnell's Patent automatic expansion gear governor. An example of the latter is still present on top of the engine next to the flywheel.

The engine is a horizontal (the cylinders are horizontal) cross-compound (high-pressure plus a low-pressure cylinder, side by side) stationary steam engine. It was once fitted with a tailrod extension on the low-pressure cylinder, and the tailrod crosshead casting has since been broken off. The high- and low-pressure cylinders were originally lagged with timber strips held on by brass bands, but most of the timber has rotted away. The high-pressure cylinder bore is about 15 inches (380 mm) in diameter while the low-pressure cylinder bore is about 24 inches (610 mm) in diameter. The stroke of both cylinders was 36 inches (910 mm), while the flywheel is 10 feet (3.0 m) in diameter, and 21 inches (530 mm) wide. The engine is mounted on a concrete base, with a concrete trough for the flywheel.

Some timber relics, plus metal objects such as piping and laddering, also survive on the site.

== Heritage listing ==
The former Johnston's Sawmill Steam Plant was listed on the Queensland Heritage Register on 15 July 2011 having satisfied the following criteria.

The place is important in demonstrating the evolution or pattern of Queensland's history.

The steam plant at the site of JM Johnston's sawmill in Mount Molloy, as part of a large and long-lived sawmill operation, is important in demonstrating the existence of the timber industry in North Queensland prior to World Heritage listing of the Wet Tropics in 1988. The presence of large tracts of rainforest and the spread of railways in the Cairns hinterland ensured that in the early 20th century the region became the main sawmilling area outside South East Queensland and the timber industry was second only to mining as a driver for North Queensland's economic development.

Johnston's sawmill, built on the site of a smaller sawmill linked to the earlier copper mining activities at Mount Molloy, operated from 1914 to 1963 as a permanent town-based mill, which enabled the town of Mount Molloy to survive the failure of mining.

The place also demonstrates the importance of steam power to sawmilling operations in Queensland, prior to the widespread availability of electricity.

The place demonstrates rare, uncommon or endangered aspects of Queensland's cultural heritage.

Steam engines were once a common form of power generation in Queensland sawmills, and in-situ examples of stationary steam engines and their associated boilers on sawmill sites are now rare throughout the state.

The Stirling water tube boiler and its blow down tank, the Marshall steam engine and Walkers steam winch are substantially intact and still demonstrate the arrangement of this type of equipment within a steam powered sawmill.

The use of large Stirling water-tube boilers and stationary compound steam engines was also rare in sawmills, which generally used single-cylinder steam engines or portable steam engines, and this example may be unique in Australia.

The place is important because of its aesthetic significance.

The remaining plant of the JM Johnston sawmill is a highly visible landmark, located on a raised corner on the main road into Mount Molloy from the south. The evocative relics are often photographed by passing tourists.

The place has a special association with the life or work of a particular person, group or organisation of importance in Queensland's history.

During his lifetime JM Johnston, whose businesses were active during the early 20th century expansion of the timber industry in the Cairns region, was a well-known figure in the North Queensland sawmilling industry. He established mills at Ravenshoe, Mount Molloy, Stratford (Cairns), Mareeba, Millaa Millaa, Bloomfield River and Shipton's Flat near Cooktown.
