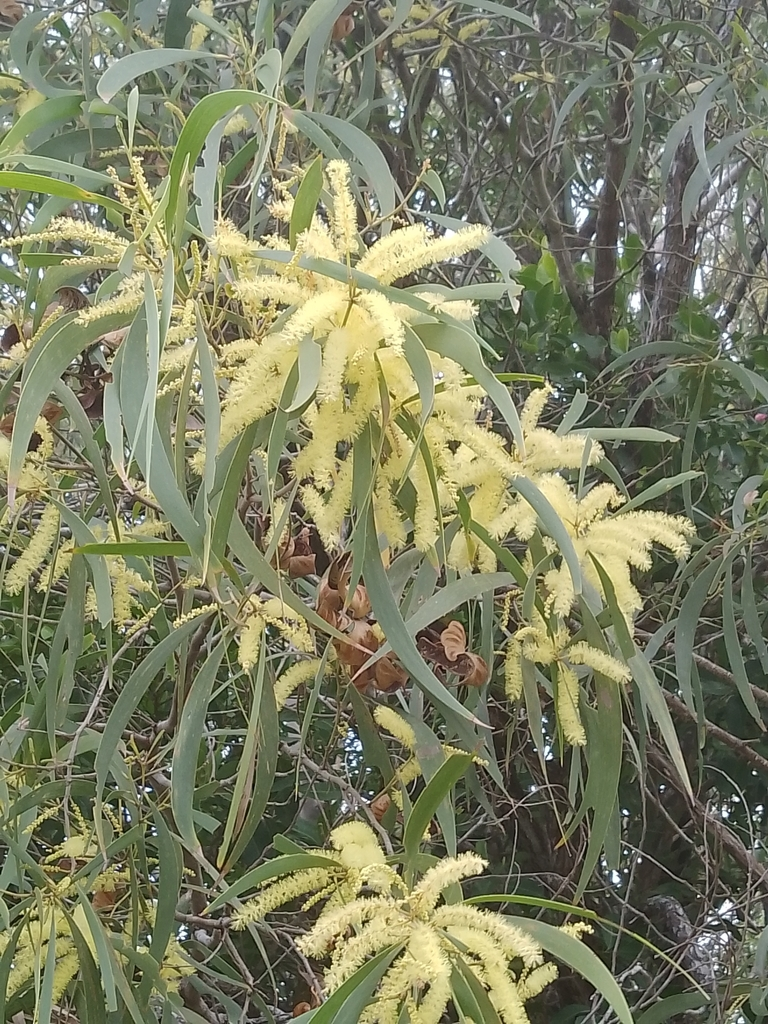

Scientific classification
- Kingdom: Plantae
- Clade: Tracheophytes
- Clade: Angiosperms
- Clade: Eudicots
- Clade: Rosids
- Order: Fabales
- Family: Fabaceae
- Subfamily: Caesalpinioideae
- Clade: Mimosoid clade
- Genus: Acacia
- Species: A. disparrima

Binomial name
- Acacia disparrima M.W.McDonald & Bruce Maslin
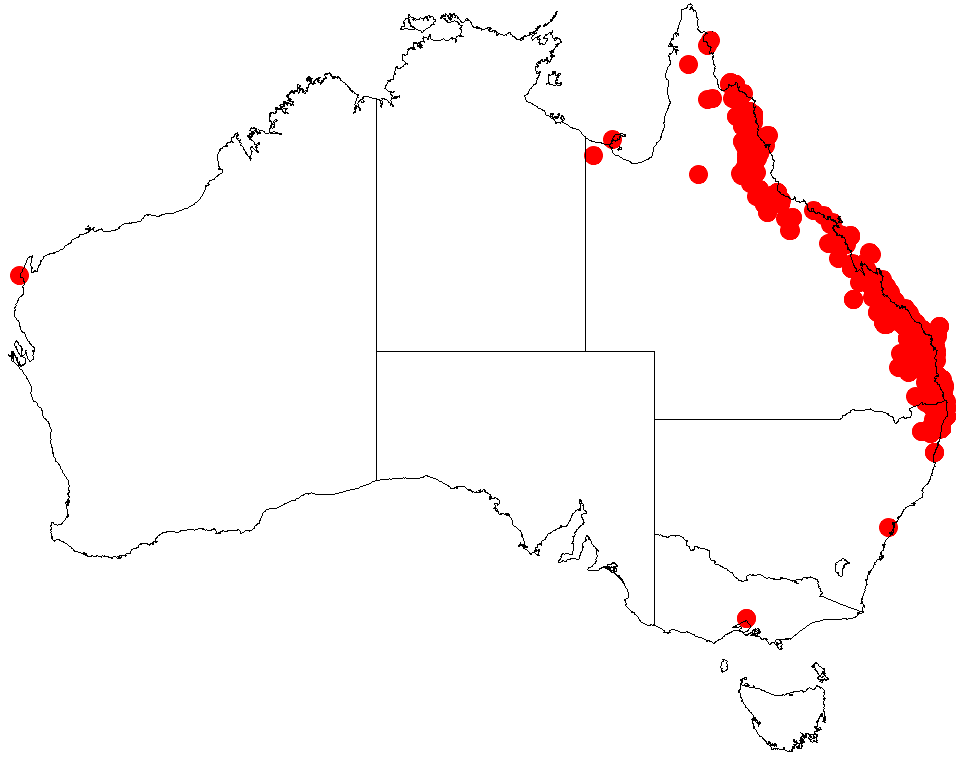
- Occurrence data from AVH

Synonyms
- Acacia aulacocarpa var. macrocarpa Benth.; Racosperma disparrimum (M.W.McDonald & Maslin) Pedley; Acacia aulacocarpa auct. non A.Cunn. ex Benth.: White, C.T. (1946); Acacia leucadendron auct. non A.Cunn. ex Benth.: Bentham, G. in Hooker, W.J. (1842)

= Acacia disparrima =

Southern salwood

Species of legume

Acacia disparrima, also commonly known as southern salwood, is a species of flowering plant in the family Fabaceae and is endemic to north eastern Australia. It is a tree-like shrub or tree with slender branchlets that are angled near the ends, dimidiate, sickle-shaped phyllodes, spikes of pale yellow to lemon yellow flowers and narrowly oblong, crusty pods.

== Description ==
Acacia disparrima is a tree-like shrub that typically grows to a height of 3 to 5 m (9.8 to 16.4 ft) or a small tree 3 to 9 m (9.8 to 29.5 ft) high, sometimes to 12 m (39 ft), and has slender branchlets that are angled at the ends. Its phyllodes are dimidiate, more or less sickle-shaped, 50–140 mm (2.0–5.5 in) long and 4–30 mm (0.16–1.18 in) wide with many parallel longitudinal veins, three to seven more prominent than the rest. The flowers are pale yellow to lemon yellow and borne in up to four spikes 20–70 mm (0.79–2.76 in) long in axils on peduncles 3–8 mm (0.12–0.31 in) long. Flowering time depends on subspecies, and the pods are narrowly oblong, straight to moderately curved, 25–90 mm (0.98–3.54 in) long and 10–20 mm (0.39–0.79 in) wide and crusty. The seeds are elliptic to oval, 3–6 mm (0.12–0.24 in) long and 2–3 mm (0.079–0.118 in) wide and glossy black to very dark brown with a variable aril.

== Taxonomy ==
Acacia disparrima was first formally described by the botanists Maurice W. McDonald and Bruce Maslin in 2000 in Australian Systematic Botany from specimens collected 0.6 km (0.37 mi) north of the Burrum River crossing on the Bruce Highway in 1996. The specific epithet (disparrima) means 'different split', referring to the pods which split along the dorsal seam, which differs from related species that split along the ventral seam.

MacDonald and Maslin described two subspecies of A. disparrima in the same volume of Australian Systematic Botany, and the names are accepted by the Australian Plant Census:

- Acacia disparrima subsp. calidestris M.W.McDonald & Maslin has two to four flower spikes per axil, five to seven minor veins per millimetre, and a white or cream-coloured aril.
- Acacia disparrima M.W.McDonald & Maslin subsp. disparrima has one or two flower spikes per axil, four to five minor veins per millimetre, and a distinctly grey or creamy-grey aril.

The subspecies epithet (calidestris) means 'living in hot', referring to the subspecies' preference for hot, dry habitats.

== Distribution and habitat ==
Southern salwood is native to coastal regions of Queensland and northern New South Wales extending into the adjacent tablelands of the east in northern Queensland.

Subspecies calidestris, commonly known as dry-land salwood, is restricted to north-east Queensland, from the Mount Carbine-Mount Molloy area and south to near Townsville, and coastal areas north of Cooktown. It flowers from March to June.

Subspecies disparrima, commonly known as salwood, southern salwood, brush ironbark wattle or hickory, mainly occurs in coastal and near-coastal areas and into nearby tablelands from Mackay in Queensland and south to the Bellinger River in New South Wales, where it grows in open forest, woodland and along the edges of rainforest and behind coastal sand dunes in wet sclerophyll forest. It flowers from January to May.

== See also ==
- List of Acacia species
