= Southedge Dam =

Dam in Queensland, Australia

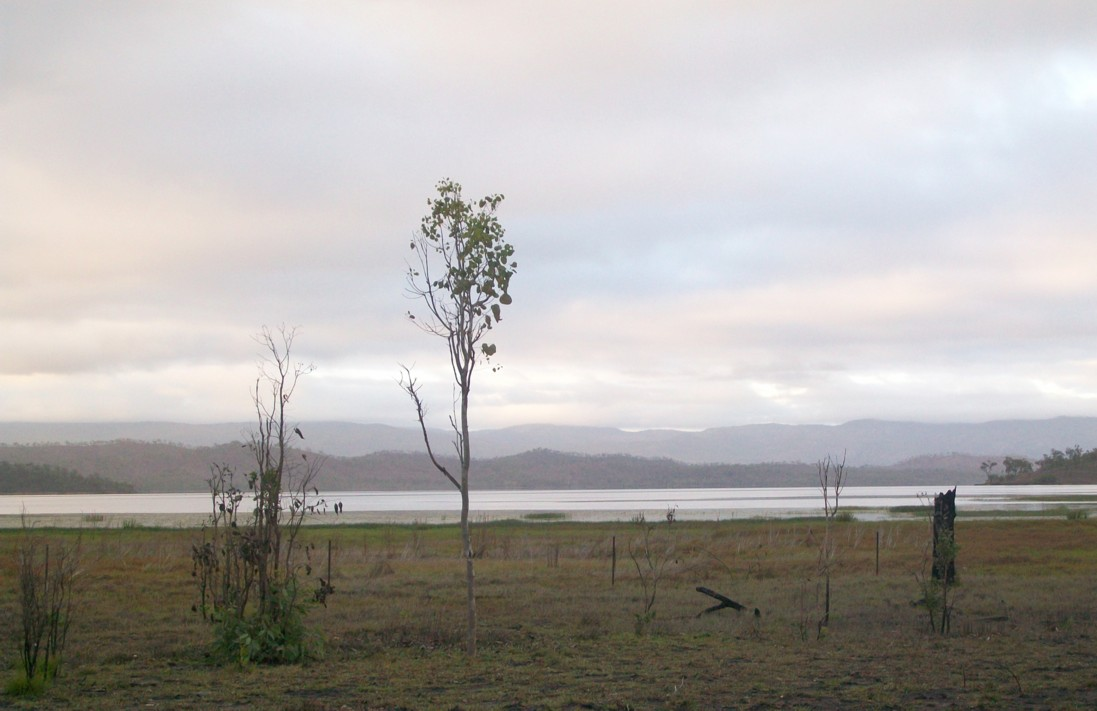
- View of Lake Mitchell, created by Southedge Dam, from the Mulligan Highway, 2009

- Location of the dam wall in Queensland
- Official name: Lake Mitchell Dam
- Country: Australia
- Location: Southedge, Queensland
- Coordinates: 16.7780°S 145.3061°E
- Purpose: Irrigation
- Status: Operational
- Construction began: 1986
- Opening date: 1987
- Owner: Southedge Pastoral Pty Ltd

Dam and spillways
- Type of dam: Embankment dam
- Impounds: Mitchell River
- Height (foundation): 16.5 metres (54 ft)
- Length: 530 metres (1,740 ft)

Reservoir
- Creates: Lake Mitchell
- Total capacity: 190,000 megalitres (42×10^{9} imp gal; 50×10^{9} US gal)
- Active capacity: 129,000 megalitres (28×10^{9} imp gal; 34×10^{9} US gal)
- Catchment area: 321 square kilometres (124 sq mi)
- Surface area: 3,290 hectares (8,100 acres)

The Southedge Dam, also known as the Lake Mitchell Dam, is an earth filled embankment dam across the Mitchell River located in Southedge, Shire of Mareeba in Far North Queensland, Australia. Opened in 1987 as an ornamental lake, the impoundment created by the dam is called Lake Mitchell and at full supply level has an active capacity of 129,000 megalitres (28×10^{9} imp gal; 34×10^{9} US gal).

== Location and features ==
Commenced in 1986 and opened a year later, the Southedge Dam wall consists of an earth-fill embankment 530 metres (1,740 ft) in length and 16.5 metres (54 ft) high. The reservoir has a catchment area of 321 square kilometres (124 sq mi). The reservoir has a total capacity of 190,000 ML (42,000,000×10^{3} imp gal; 50,000,000×10^{3} US gal) of water; and covers an area of 3,290 ha (8,100 acres). Southedge Dam has remained unused since it was opened in 1987; constructed and owned by Southedge Pastoral Company.

When the dam spills over, it flows into the Mitchell River.

== See also ==
- List of dams and reservoirs in Queensland
- Quaid Road
