= James Venture Mulligan =

Ireland-born Australian prospector and explorer

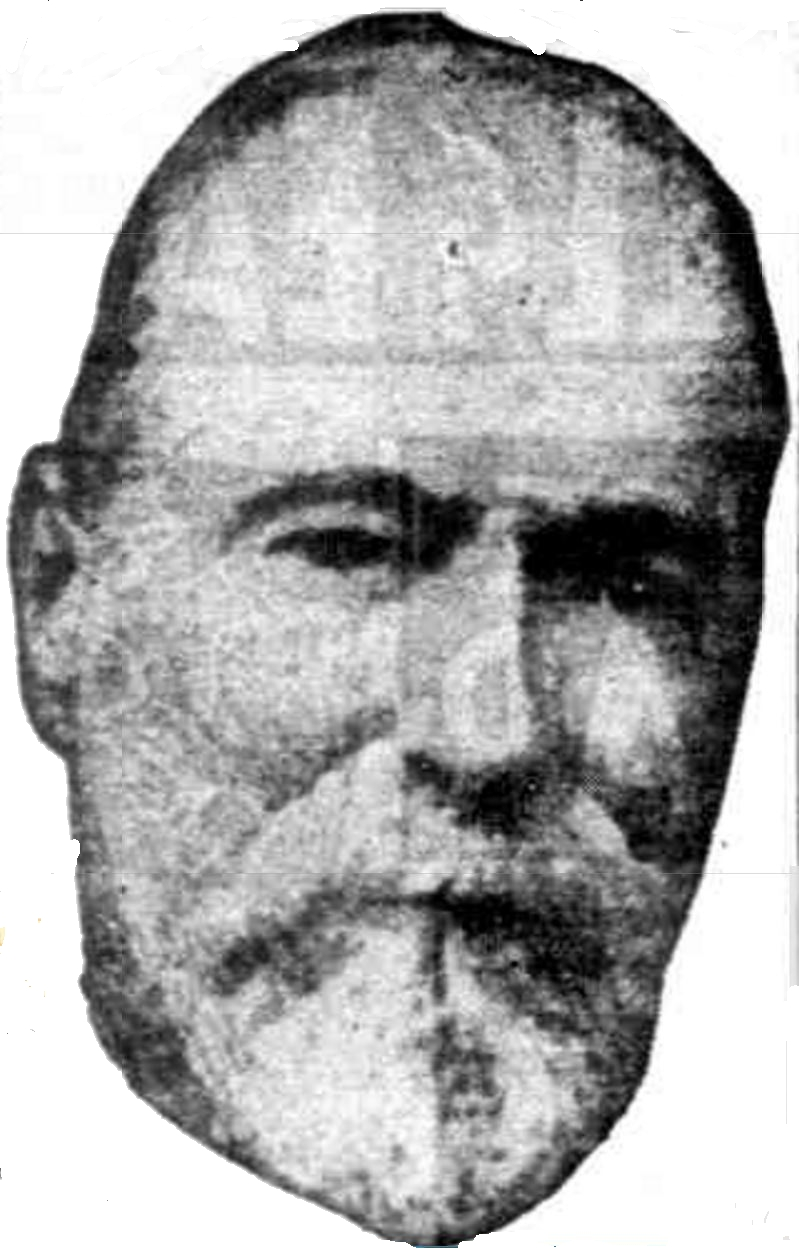
James Venture Mulligan

James Venture Mulligan (13 February 1837 – 24 August 1907) was an Ireland-born Australian prospector and explorer.

== Early life ==
Mulligan was born in Drumgooland, County Down and emigrated to Australia at the age of 21 in 1860. He settled at Armidale in the British colony of New South Wales where he became a butcher and a publican. While residing there, Mulligan became involved in gold prospecting at the nearby Rocky River diggings.

== Prospecting in Queensland ==
In 1867, Mulligan ventured north to the colony of Queensland to further pursue aspirations of fortune from gold diggings. After mediocre success at Gympie, Mulligan went to the Etheridge goldfields in the early 1870s. From there he later led a group to find payable gold on the Palmer River in Far North Queensland which had been reported by William Hann. On 30 June 1873, despite the local Aboriginal people attempting to burn down their tents, the group returned with 102 ounces of payable gold. Mulligan reported his find on 24 August to the Warden of the Etheridge Gold Field at Georgetown and the information was widely published in the press shortly after. By early 1874, Mulligan returned to the Palmer to find 3000 diggers there beset with problems like potential starvation, large biting flies and "the darkies" defending their territories. Mulligan suggested that four paramilitary Native Police camps be set up to clear the area of "the sneaking propensities of the blacks". The Palmer area was later overrun by more than 30,000 prospectors, many of whom were Chinese. Mulligan, being supportive of providing privileged status to miners of European background, became a principal organiser in anti-Chinese movements. In September 1874, Mulligan led a prospecting expedition to the south-east of the Palmer, a journey where he named the Hodgkinson River and Mount Mulligan. In 1875 he was awarded £1000 for opening up the Palmer goldfields and appointed to lead a government sponsored prospecting expedition. This expedition covered and assessed an extensive region for colonial exploitation, with Mulligan naming multiple rivers and landmarks. During this exploration, Mulligan found tin ore around the headwaters of the Herbert River. In 1876, he returned to the Hodgkinson River and found gold which triggered a rush to the Hodgkinson goldfields.

Mulligan lived at Thornborough on the Hodgkinson goldfield for a number of years while still maintaining prospecting pursuits. In 1880 he discovered silver in the Silver Valley west of Herberton. In the same year Mulligan also conducted an expedition with Christie Palmerston to search for gold north of the Palmer River. This mission was largely unsuccessful but Mulligan was able to describe an event where Palmerston raided an Aboriginal settlement, killing men and kidnapping a boy for use as a personal servant. Mulligan admired Palmerston's method of "civilising the blacks" as well as his prospecting skills, advocating the government to fund Palmerston to deal with Aboriginals along the Daintree River in view to create a goldfield there.

In the mid 1880s, Mulligan travelled west to investigate the mineral areas around Cloncurry and worked in the town of Croydon for a number of years as a mines manager. From the early 1890s until his death in 1907, he was back in the Tablelands Region of Queensland, involving himself in various mining enterprises including tin, antimony, copper and tungsten extraction.

== Later life ==
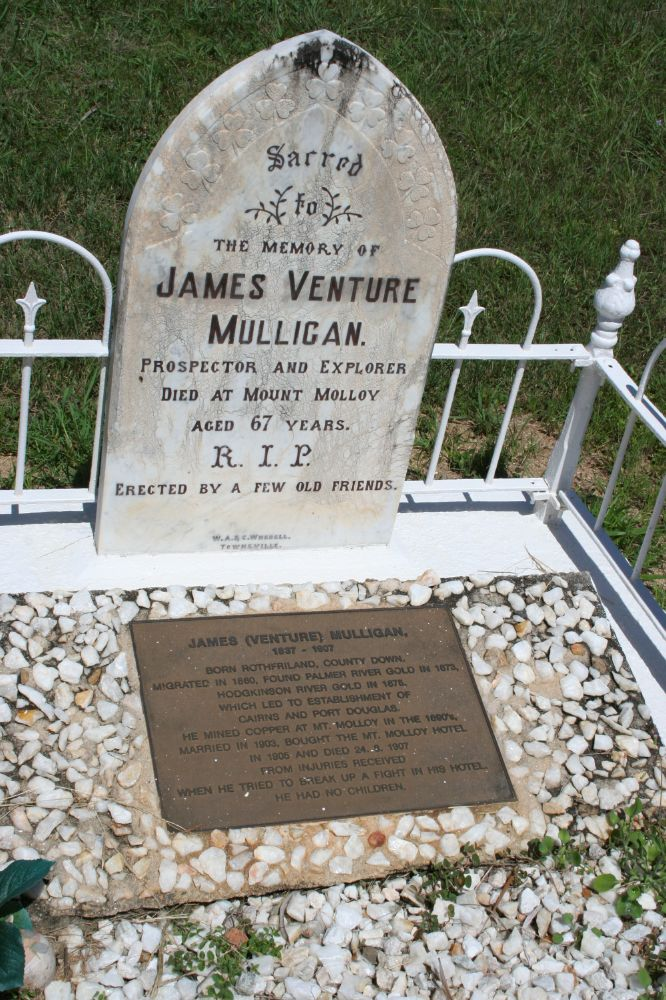
James Venture Mulligan's Grave in Mount Molloy Cemetery, 2010

Mulligan was married in Brisbane on 5 March 1903. In that year he also purchased the Mount Molloy Hotel. He died on 24 August 1907 from pneumonia after breaking some ribs falling from a balcony while attempting to punch a man during a fight at Mount Carbine. He was buried in Mount Molloy cemetery. His headstone reads:

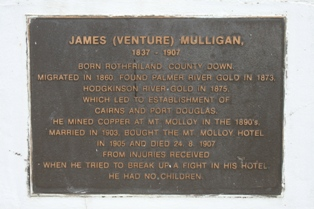
Memorial plaque at Mount Molloy

Sacred to the memory of James Venture Mulligan, prospector and explorer, died at Mount Molloy aged 69 years. RIP. Erected by a few old friends.

== Legacy ==
Mount Mulligan and the Mulligan Highway in Far North Queensland, and the Mulligan River in south-west Queensland, were named after him.

James Venture Mulligan's Grave was listed on the Queensland Heritage Register in 1992.

== Sources ==
- Holthouse, Hector (1967). River of Gold: The Story of the Palmer River Gold Rush. Angus and Robertson Publishers. ISBN 0-207-13802-8.
- Geographia's website
