= Goodenia debilis =

Scientific classification
- Kingdom: Plantae
- Clade: Tracheophytes
- Clade: Angiosperms
- Clade: Eudicots
- Clade: Asterids
- Order: Asterales
- Family: Goodeniaceae
- Genus: Goodenia
- Species: G. debilis

Binomial name
- Goodenia debilis A.E.Holland & T.P.Boyle

Species of plant

Goodenia debilis is a species of flowering plant in the family Goodeniaceae and is endemic to Queensland. It is an annual herb with linear to lance-shaped leaves at the base of the plant, and leafy racemes of cream-coloured or yellow flowers with brownish markings.

== Description ==
Goodenia debilis is an ascending or weakly erect annual herb that typically grows to a height of about 40 cm (16 in). The leaves are arranged at the base of the plant and are sessile, linear to lance-shaped, 10–50 mm (0.39–1.97 in) long and 0.5–3 mm (0.020–0.118 in) wide. The flowers are arranged in leafy racemes up to 20 mm (0.79 in) long, each flower on a pedicel 11–22 mm (0.43–0.87 in) long. The sepals are linear, 1–2 mm (0.039–0.079 in) long, the petals cream-coloured or yellow with brownish markings, 4–6 mm (0.16–0.24 in) long, the lower lobes 0.5–2 mm (0.020–0.079 in) long with wings about 1 mm (0.039 in) wide. Flowering occurs from February to September and the fruit is an elliptic capsule 4–7 mm (0.16–0.28 in) long and 2–3 mm (0.079–0.118 in) wide.

== Taxonomy and naming ==
Goodenia debilis was first formally described in 2002 by Ailsa E. Holland and T.P. Boyle in the journal Austrobaileya from specimens collected in Bulleringa National Park. The specific epithet (debilis) means "feeble" or "weak".

== Distribution and habitat ==
This goodenia grows in woodland with species of Eucalyptus and Melaleuca in Queensland between the Torres Strait Islands and Townsville with a single collection on Mornington Island.
