= Alice River (Far North Queensland) =

Alice
- Location of Alice River mouth in Queensland
- Etymology: In honour of Alice Johnston

Location
- Country: Australia
- State: Queensland
- Region: Far North Queensland

Physical characteristics
- Source: Great Dividing Range
  - location: Dixie
  - coordinates: 15°21′23″S 143°29′27″E
  - elevation: 132 m (433 ft)
- Mouth: confluence with the Mitchell River
  - location: Kowanyama
  - coordinates: 15°21′29″S 141°58′32″E
  - elevation: 12 m (39 ft)
- Length: 332 km (206 mi)
- Basin size: 12,943 km^{2} (4,997 sq mi)

Basin features
- River system: Mitchell River
- Tributaries
  - left: Ten Mile Creek, Horse Creek, Back Creek
  - right: Crosbie Creek, Goose Creek

The Alice River is a river on the Cape York Peninsula of Far North Queensland, Australia.

The headwaters of the river rise west of the Great Dividing Range in Dixie. It flows westward down the valleys and across Aerodrome Plain where they turn south west forming braided channels. The river then turns northwest and continues forming the northern border of Mitchell-Alice Rivers National Park before discharging into Mitchell River. From source to mouth, the river is joined by twelve tributaries and descends 119 metres (390 ft) over its 332-kilometre (206 mi) course.

The catchment area of the river occupies 12,943 square kilometres (4,997 sq mi), part of the much larger Mitchell River catchment that has a total area of 71,670 square kilometres (27,672 sq mi).

Vegetation across the catchment area is speargrass savannah dominated by stringybark, bloodwoods and Moreton Bay ash. Along the river banks and tributaries there are open stands of paperbarks and dense riparian rainforest. The season swamps and lagoons have Melaleucas and freshwater mangrove with water lilies in standing water.

The river was named c. 1886 by Frank Johnston, the manager of Koolata cattle station, after his wife Alice.

== See also ==
- List of rivers of Australia § Queensland
