= Eucalyptus provecta =

Scientific classification
- Kingdom: Plantae
- Clade: Tracheophytes
- Clade: Angiosperms
- Clade: Eudicots
- Clade: Rosids
- Order: Myrtales
- Family: Myrtaceae
- Genus: Eucalyptus
- Species: E. provecta

Binomial name
- Eucalyptus provecta A.R.Bean

Species of eucalyptus

Eucalyptus provecta is a species of small tree that is endemic to Queensland. It has rough, fibrous to flaky bark on the trunk and branches, lance-shaped adult leaves, flower buds in groups of seven on the ends of branchlets, white flowers and cup-shaped fruit.

== Description ==
Eucalyptus provecta is a tree, rarely a mallee, that typically grows to a height of 12 m (39 ft) and forms a lignotuber. It has rough, grey, fibrous to flaky bark on the trunk and branches. Young plants and coppice regrowth have dull, greyish green, egg-shaped to lance-shaped leaves that are 45–90 mm (1.8–3.5 in) long and 10–32 mm (0.39–1.26 in) wide. Adult leaves are the same shade of dull green on both sides, lance-shaped to narrow lance-shaped, 65–130 mm (2.6–5.1 in) long and 8–20 mm (0.31–0.79 in) wide, tapering to a petiole 5–17 mm (0.20–0.67 in) long. The flower buds are arranged on the ends of branchlets in groups of seven on a branched peduncle 2–8 mm (0.079–0.315 in) long, the individual buds on pedicels 2–6 mm (0.079–0.236 in) long. Mature buds are oval, 3–5 mm (0.12–0.20 in) long and 2–3 mm (0.079–0.118 in) wide with a rounded operculum. Flowering has been recorded in January, May, June, July and October and the flowers are white. The fruit is a woody, cup-shaped capsule 3–5 mm (0.12–0.20 in) long and wide with the valves usually below the rim level.

== Taxonomy ==
Eucalyptus provecta was first formally described in 2000 by Anthony Bean in the journal Austrobaileya from material collected near Forsayth in 1997. The specific epithet (provecta) is from the Latin word provectus meaning "advanced", "carried forward" or "extended", referring to the rough bark extending to the branches.

== Distribution and habitat ==
This tree occurs in far north Queensland from Bulleringa National Park to Chuddleigh Park station north of Hughenden.

== Conservation status ==
This eucalypt is classified as "least concern" under the Queensland Government Nature Conservation Act 1992.

== See also ==
- List of Eucalyptus species
