= Cryptandra pogonoloba =

Scientific classification
- Kingdom: Plantae
- Clade: Tracheophytes
- Clade: Angiosperms
- Clade: Eudicots
- Clade: Rosids
- Order: Rosales
- Family: Rhamnaceae
- Genus: Cryptandra
- Species: C. pogonoloba

Binomial name
- Cryptandra pogonoloba A.R.Bean

Species of flowering plant

Cryptandra pogonoloba is a species of flowering plant in the family Rhamnaceae and is endemic to south-eastern Queensland. It is a shrub with linear to lance-shaped leaves with the narrower end towards the base, and white to creamy-white, tube-shaped flowers.

== Description ==
Cryptandra pogonoloba is a shrub that typically grows to a height of 0.5–1 m (1 ft 8 in – 3 ft 3 in), its young branchlets covered with small, star-shaped hairs but not spiny. Its leaves are linear or elliptic to lance-shaped with the narrower end towards the base, 4.0–8.5 mm (0.16–0.33 in) long and 0.8–1.2 mm (0.031–0.047 in) wide on a petiole 0.3–0.9 mm (0.012–0.035 in) long. There are triangular to egg-shaped stipules 0.7–1.2 mm (0.028–0.047 in) long at the base of the petiole, but separate from each other. The lower surface of the leaves is densely hairy, or concealed. The flowers are borne singly in leaf axils with 4 to 9 brown bracts at the base. The sepals are white to creamy-white and form a tube 0.7–0.8 mm (0.028–0.031 in) long with erect lobes 1.0–1.2 mm (0.039–0.047 in) long and hairy. The petals are white, protrude 0.2–0.4 mm (0.0079–0.0157 in) beyond the sepal tube, and form a hood over the stamens. Flowering has been observed from April to June, and the fruit is a schizocarp 2.1–2.4 mm (0.083–0.094 in) long.

== Taxonomy and naming ==
Cryptandra pogonoloba was first formally described in 2004 by Anthony Bean in the journal Austrobaileya from specimens collected in Bulleringa National Park in 1998. The specific epithet (pogonoloba) refers to the usual shape of the leaves.

In 2006, Jürgen Kellerman described two subspecies of C. pogonoloba in the journal Muelleria, and the names are accepted by the Australian Plant Census:

- Cryptandra pogonoloba A.R.Bean subsp. pogonoloba has leaves mostly 3–9 mm (0.12–0.35 in) long and 0.5–1.2 mm (0.020–0.047 in) wide with a minutely pimply or hairy upper surface.
- Cryptandra pogonoloba subsp. septentrionalis Kellerman has leaves mostly 2.3–4.5 mm (0.091–0.177 in) long and 0.4–0.6 mm (0.016–0.024 in) wide with a smooth, glabrous upper surface.

== Distribution and habitat ==
Subspecies pogonoloba grows in sandy soil on sandstone in woodland from the Windsor Tablelands and Daintree National Park to the Gregory Range and subsp. septentrionalis grows in heath, shrubland and open woodland and is only known from between the Pascoe River and Kutini-Payamu (Iron Range) National Park in far north Queensland.
