= Quaid Road =

Road in Queensland, Australia

Coordinates: 16°39′45″S 145°33′33″E

Southedge-Wangetti Road Queensland

General information
- Type: Rural road
- Length: 32 km (20 mi)

Location(s)
- Major settlements: Wangetti, Southedge

Highway system
- Highways in Australia; National Highway • Freeways in Australia; Highways in Queensland

Southedge-Wangetti Road Corridor (formerly and unofficially Quaid Road) is a 32-kilometre-long (20 mi) stretch of road in Far North Queensland. It links the Captain Cook Highway at Wangetti on the coast just north of Cairns, to the Mulligan Highway at Southedge, just south of Mount Molloy. In November 1983 George Quaid wanted to legally build the road corridor with the approval of the Queensland Government, which was granted. In April 1988 the Australian Government made a regulation under the World Heritage Properties Conservation Act 1983 to prevent the road opening. However, the road was completed in early 1989 through some rainforest areas that were later declared Wet Tropics World Heritage Area in late 1989.

== Route description ==
The Southedge-Wangetti Road Corridor links Wangetti on the coast just north of Cairns, to Southedge, just south of Mount Molloy, over a distance of 32 kilometres (20 mi). The road corridor is currently closed to public access and has a number of locked gates along its route. The road corridor closure is due to the Wet Tropics Management Authority not allowing access to certain parts of the road. The road corridor is maintained by the road owners, with both engineering and environmental reports submitted annually to the Wet Tropics Management Authority. Motorised vehicular access is by permit only and granted only by the Wet Tropics Management Authority.

The road corridor was initially built as a private access road corridor and a future potential supplementary route to the Atherton Tableland and the Mulligan Highway, not as an alternative to the Kuranda Range Crossing. Travel times from Cairns CBD to Mount Molloy are cut from 1hr 45 min to less than an hour.

The design and construction of the Southedge-Wangetti Road Corridor was carried out under National Association of Australian State Road Authorities guidelines.

== History ==
In November 1983 George Quaid wanted to legally build the road with the approval of the Queensland Government, which was granted. In April 1988 the Australian Government made a regulation under the World Heritage Properties Conservation Act 1983 to prevent the road opening. However, the road was completed in early 1989 through some rainforest areas that were later declared Wet Tropics World Heritage Area in late 1989. Ever since its construction as a private road, the road has been a hot issue in Far North Queensland. For years after its construction, the road was suggested as an alternative route to the Atherton Tableland for everyday traffic as well as evacuations during cyclones. However, in 1997, Transport and Main Roads Minister Vaughan Johnson announced that the state government was no longer considering gazetting the Southedge-Wangetti Road as a State-controlled road because it would put additional pressure on the Captain Cook Highway and divert funding away from upgrades of other parts of State road network in Far North Queensland.

During Cyclone Larry in 2006, all road access to the major regional city of Cairns was blocked and the city was isolated from surrounding areas for three days. This was caused by flooding south of the city near Innisfail and landslides near Port Douglas and on the Kuranda Range Highway. After this period of isolation, Tablelands MP Rosa Lee Long proposed that Southedge-Wangetti Road be used as another route to truck food into Cairns and evacuate people but the Queensland State Government again rejected the proposal. The Cook Shire Council expressed Council's disappointment with this decision by forwarding a letter to the then-current Minister for Transport and Main Roads, Paul Lucas.

After the Cairns tsunami scare of April 2007, this idea has become more popular with the city's population once again.
