= Dedin, Queensland =

Dedin
- Suburb
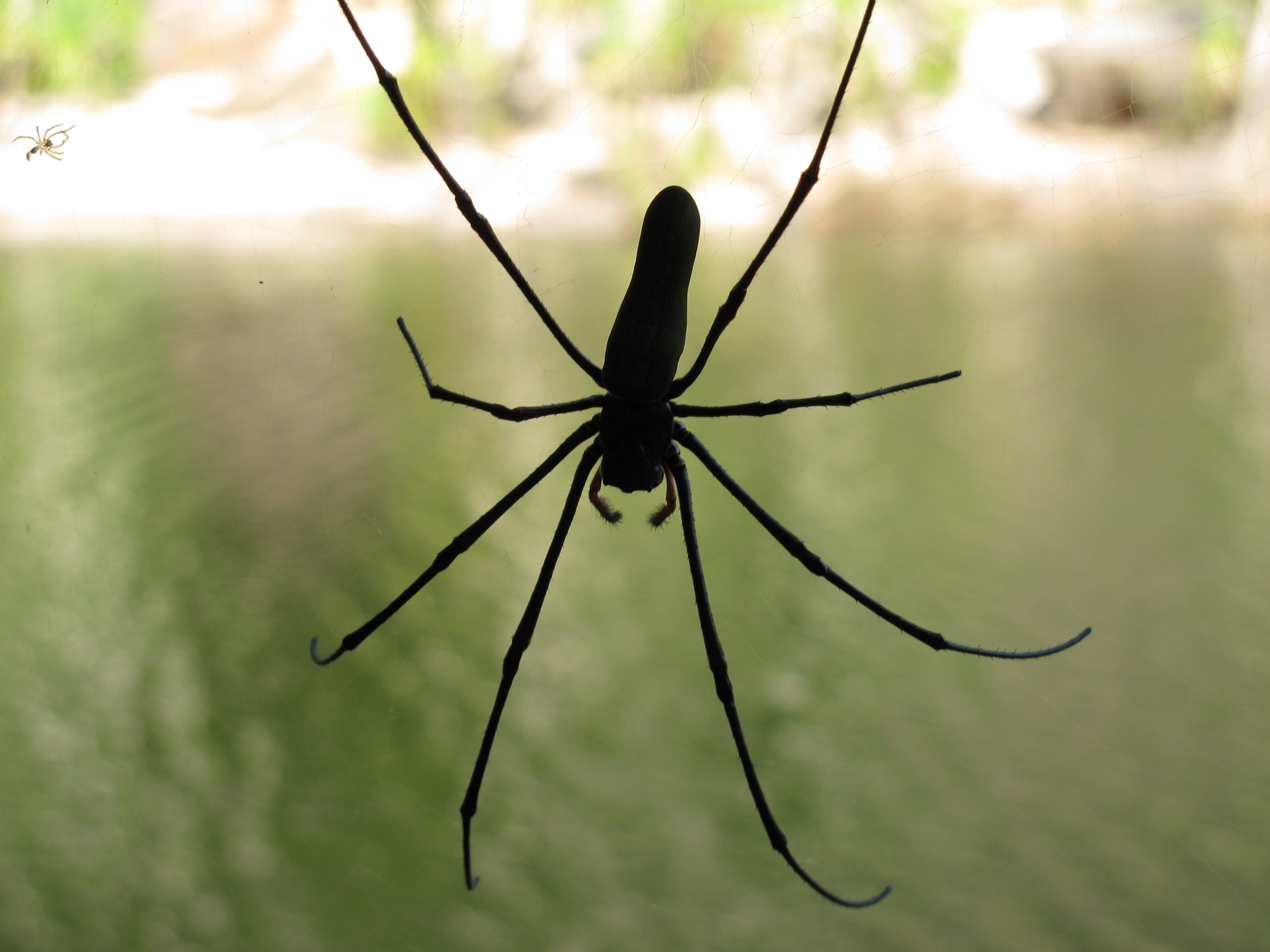
- Spider in Dedin

- Interactive map of Dedin
- Coordinates: 16.2736°S 145.1686°E
- Country: Australia
- State: Queensland
- LGA: Shire of Douglas
- Location: 16.2 km (10.1 mi) W of Daintree; 30.2 km (18.8 mi) NW of Mossman; 96.0 km (59.7 mi) NW of Cairns; 1,481 km (920 mi) NNW of Brisbane

Government
  - State electorate: Cook
  - Federal division: Leichhardt

Area
  - Total: 418.4 km^{2} (161.5 sq mi)

Population
  - Total: 0 (2021 census)
  - Density: 0.0000/km^{2} (0.0000/sq mi)
- Postcode: 4873
Suburbs around Dedin
Lakeland	Bloomfield	Dagmar
Spurgeon	Dedin	Stewart Creek Valley
Mount Carbine	Syndicate	Whyanbeel

Dedin is an undeveloped locality in the Shire of Douglas, Queensland, Australia. In the 2021 census, Dedin had "no people or a very low population".

== Geography ==
The Great Dividing Range forms the south-western boundary of the locality. The locality is within the North East Coast drainage basin, specifically within the Daintree River catchment.

The locality is within the Daintree National Park with the exception of a small area in the north-west of the locality which is in the Mount Windsor National Park.

== Demographics ==
In the 2016 census, Dedin had "no people or a very low population".

In the 2021 census, Dedin had "no people or a very low population".

== Education ==
There are no schools in Dedin. The nearest government schools are Daintree State School in Daintree to the east and Mossman State High School to the south-east.
