= Wangetti, Queensland =

Wangetti
- Town
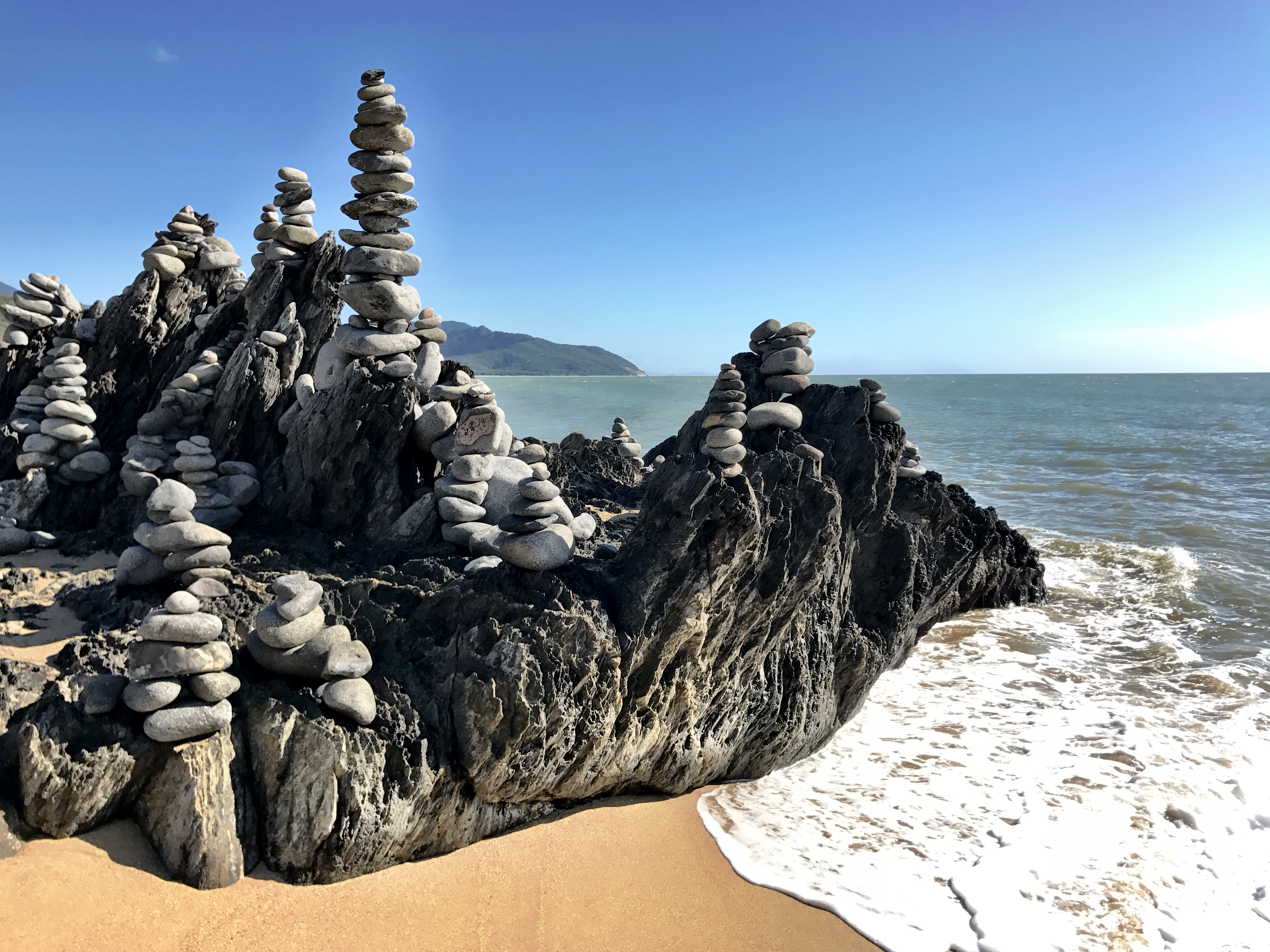
- Gatz balancing rocks, Wangetti Beach, 2017

- Interactive map of Wangetti
- Coordinates: 16.6583°S 145.5669°E
- Country: Australia
- State: Queensland
- LGA: Shire of Douglas
- Location: 26.7 km (16.6 mi) NNW of Smithfield; 35.8 km (22.2 mi) SE of Mossman; 40.3 km (25.0 mi) NNW of Cairns CBD; 1,741 km (1,082 mi) NNW of Brisbane

Government
  - State electorate: Cook
  - Federal division: Leichhardt

Area
  - Total: 71.7 km^{2} (27.7 sq mi)

Population
  - Total: 68 (2021 census)
  - Density: 0.948/km^{2} (2.456/sq mi)
- Time zone: UTC+10:00 (AEST)
- Postcode: 4877
Localities around Wangetti
Mona Mona	Mowbray	Coral Sea
Mona Mona	Wangetti	Coral Sea
Mona Mona	Mona Mona	Macalister Range

Wangetti is a coastal town and a locality in the Shire of Douglas, Queensland, Australia. In the 2021 census, the locality of Wangetti had a population of 68 people.

== Geography ==
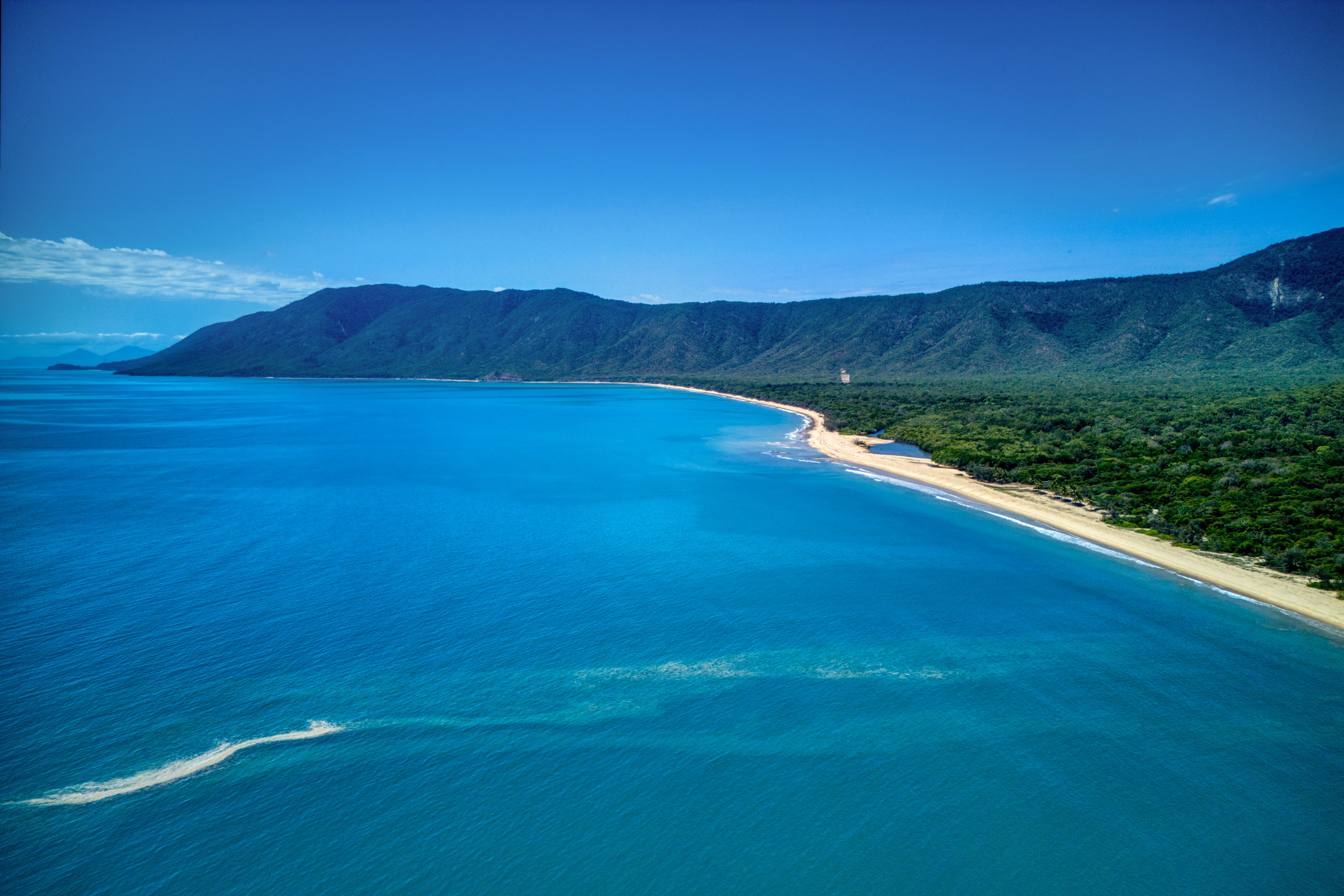
Wangetti Beach

The Captain Cook Highway runs through the locality from south to north mostly hugging the coastline.

The land is mostly undeveloped and, apart from a small area of freehold land around the town of Wangetii, the vast majority of the locality is part of the Macalister Range National Park. There is no public access to the national park because it is an important cassowary habitat and part of the Wet Tropics World Heritage Area.

The Southedge-Wangetti Road, also known as Quaid Road, is a road that was completed by the government in 1989 with no public access linking Wangetti to Southedge.

== Demographics ==
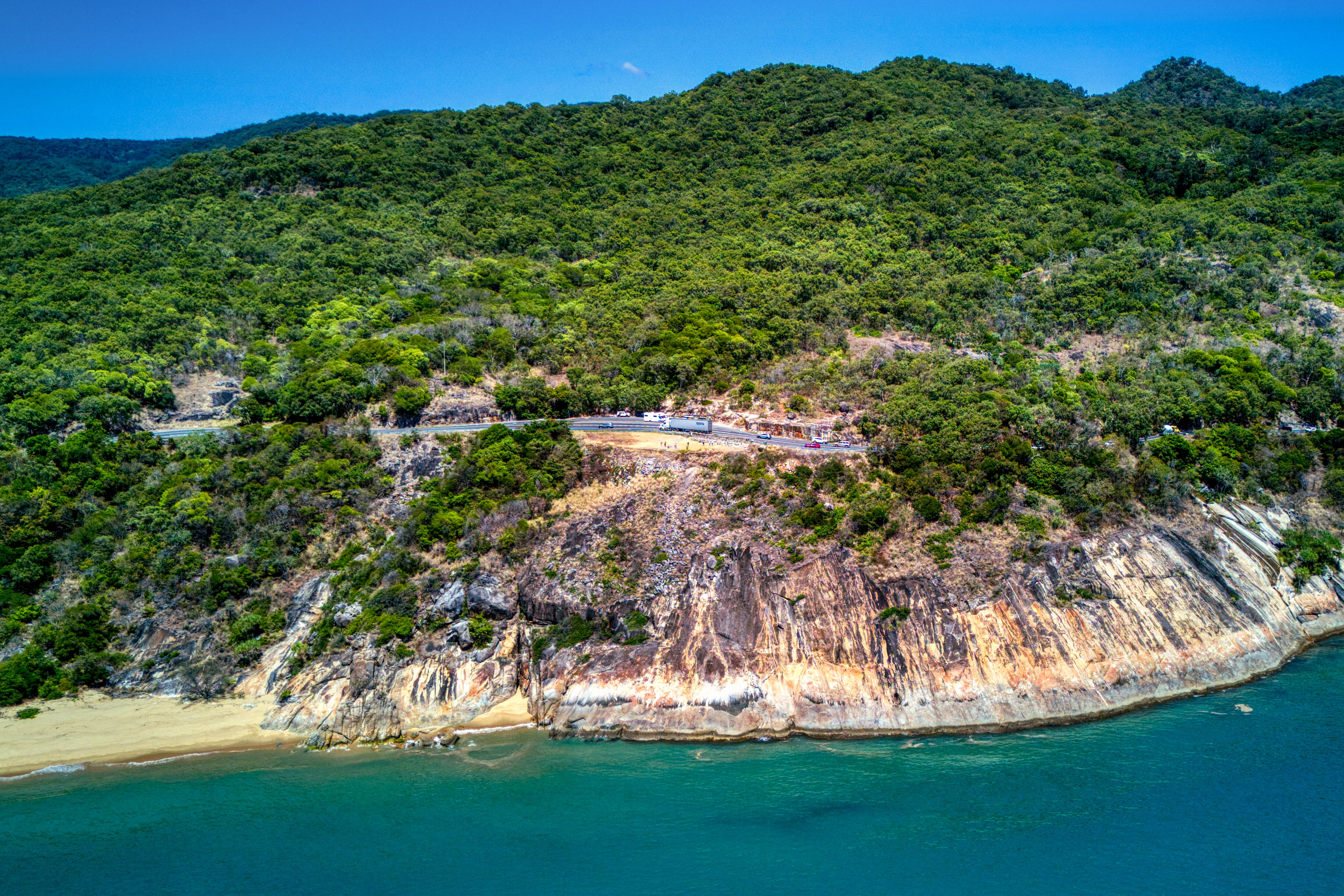
Rex Lookout on Captain Cook Highway, near Wangetti

In the 2016 census, the locality of Wangetti had a population of 50 people.

In the 2021 census, the locality of Wangetti had a population of 68 people.

== Attractions ==
Hartley's Crocodile Adventures is a zoo and farm featuring crocodiles and other Australian animals. They were the first place in Australian to breed crocodiles.

== Education ==
Cape York Girl Academy is a private secondary (7-12) boarding school for young Indigenous mothers at 4099 Captain Cook Highway (16.6546°S 145.5643°E). In 2017, the school had an enrolment of 21 students with 3 teachers and 7 non-teaching staff (6 full-time equivalent). Teenage pregnancies often cause a young Indigenous women to drop out of education, so the school was established with the specific aim to enable young Indigenous mothers to complete their education while raising their babies in a supportive environment.

There are no government schools in Wangetti. The nearest government primary schools are Port Douglas State School in Port Douglas to the north-west and Trinity Beach State School in Trinity Beach to the south-east. The nearest government secondary school is Smithfield State High School in Smithfield to the south-east.
