= Mitchell River (Queensland) =

River in Queensland, Australia

Mitchell
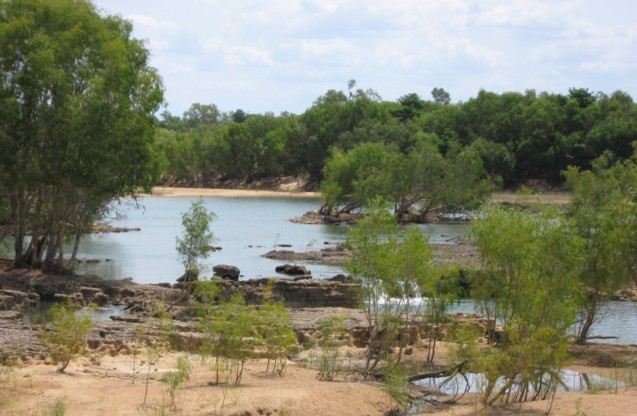
- View inland, up the Mitchell River, at small waterfalls in between Dunbar and Koolatah stations

- Location of Mitchell River mouth in Queensland
- Etymology: In honour of Sir Thomas Mitchell

Location
- Country: Australia
- State: Queensland
- Region: Far North Queensland

Physical characteristics
- Source: Atherton Tableland, Great Dividing Range
  - location: west of Kuranda
  - coordinates: 16°46′42″S 145°18′11″E
  - elevation: 376 m (1,234 ft)
- Mouth: Gulf of Carpentaria
  - location: north of Kowanyama
  - coordinates: 15°11′47″S 141°35′04″E
  - elevation: 0 m (0 ft)
- Length: 750 km (470 mi)
- Basin size: 71,757 km^{2} (27,706 sq mi) to 73,230 km^{2} (28,270 sq mi)
- Discharge
  - location: Mitchell River Delta, Gulf of Carpentaria
  - average: (Period: 1890-2015)15,570 GL/a (493 m^{3}/s) to 22,951,000 ML/a (727.3 m^{3}/s)

Basin features
- Tributaries
  - left: Hodgkinson River, Dry River (Queensland), Walsh River, Lynd River
  - right: McLeod River (Queensland), St George River (Queensland), Little Mitchell River, Palmer River (Queensland), Alice River
- National parks: Hann Tableland National Park; Mitchell-Alice Rivers National Park; Chillagoe-Mungana Caves National Park; Bulleringa National Park; Forty Mile Scrub National Park

The Mitchell River is a river in Far North Queensland, Australia. The river rises on the Atherton Tableland about 50 kilometres (31 mi) northwest of Cairns and flows about 750 kilometres (470 mi) northwest across Cape York Peninsula from Mareeba to the Gulf of Carpentaria.

The river's watershed covers an area of 71,757 km^{2} (27,706 sq mi). The Mitchell has the state's largest discharge, at 11.3 million megalitres (2.5×10^{12} imp gal; 3.0×10^{12} US gal) annually, but is intermittent and may be dry for part of the year. Lake Mitchell is the main water storage facility on the river.

It was named by Ludwig Leichhardt on 16 June 1845 after Sir Thomas Mitchell while he was on his overland expedition from Moreton Bay to Port Essington. It may have been previously named the Vereenighde River in 1623 by Dutch merchant and navigator Jan Carstensz.

== Biophysical aspects ==
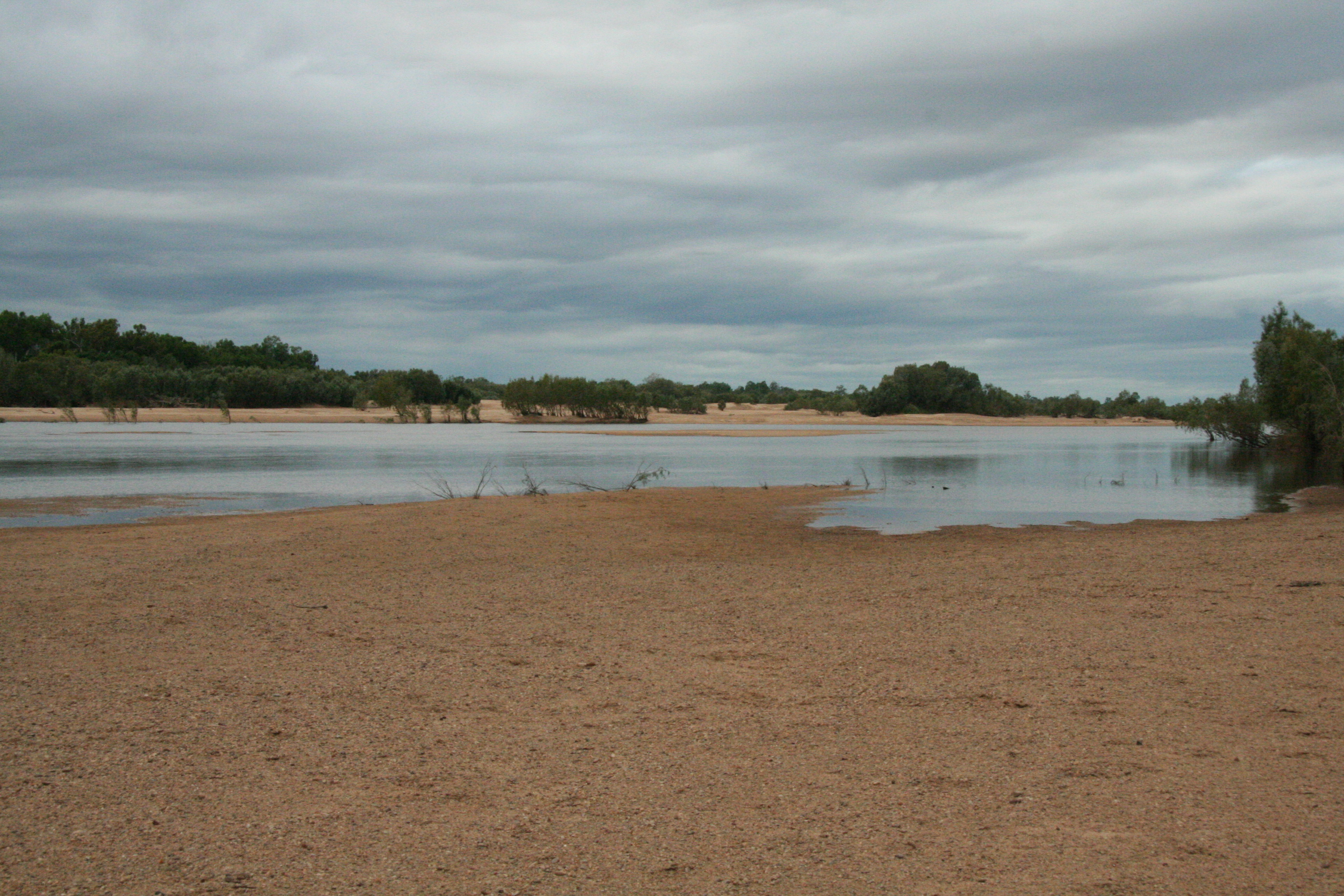
Mitchell River at Koolatah-Dunbar Crossing

The Mitchell River and its tributaries have for a long time carved their way westwards through the rugged, weathered highlands of the Great Dividing Range, carrying away sediments to be deposited in the broad floodplains and wetlands of the Gulf Savannah country.

The rivers' waters "pulse" annually with monsoonal rains, seasonally collecting water from across the local tropical rainforests in the highlands to the east; the wet sclerophyll forests in the central uplands; a variety of woodlands plus savannah in the western plains; annually flooding with freshwater, the tidal plains, wetlands, estuaries, and mangroves of the lower Mitchell and coastal plains.

From source to mouth, the Mitchell River is joined by 34 tributaries including the McLeod River, Hodgkinson River, St George River, Dry River, Little Mitchell River, Walsh River, Lynd River, Palmer River and Alice River.

Protected areas within the Mitchell River catchment include the Hann Tableland, Mitchell-Alice Rivers, Chillagoe-Mungana Caves, part of Bulleringa to the south, and most of the Forty Mile Scrub national parks.

== Fauna and flora ==
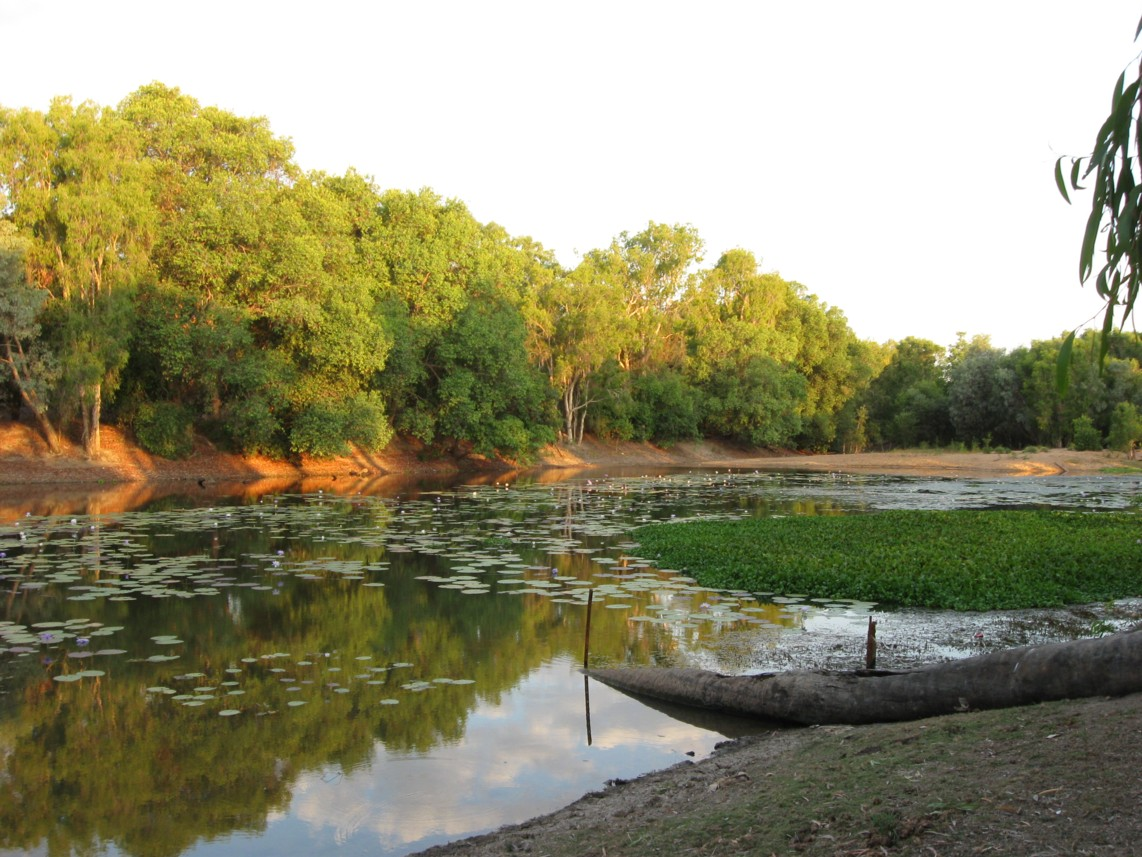
Lagoon immediately next to Kowanyama township

Being a large river system, the Mitchell River may contain within its catchment one of Australia's most ecologically diverse aquatic systems consisting of a rich variety of both wet and dry tropical monsoonal habitats.

The catchment ecology as a whole has been generally described as follows:

The vegetation in the Mitchell River Catchment area ranges from the World Heritage Wet Tropic rainforest on the eastern highlands to the open savannah on the western and lower Mitchell plains. The extensive mangroves and lagoon systems at the delta of the Mitchell River are recognised worldwide. The permanent waters in the upper catchment are associated with springs and water holes...

More specifically, while this ecologically diverse river system is relatively poorly studied, it is known to contain at least 18 rare, endangered or vulnerable animal species including the golden-shouldered parrot, the Gouldian finch and the northern bettong. The mouth of the river lies in the Gulf Plains Important Bird Area.

== Towns ==
The major towns in the river's catchment are Kowanyama, Chillagoe, Dimbulah, Mount Carbine and Mount Molloy. Other smaller towns in the Mitchell River catchment include Mutchilba and Almaden.

== History ==
Kunjen (also known as Koko Wanggara, Ngundjan and Olkola) is a language of Western Cape York. The Kunjen language region includes the landscape within the local government boundaries of Kowanyama Community Council and Cook Shire Council.

Yir Yiront (also known as Yiront, Jirjoront, Yir-yiront, and Kokomindjan) is an Australian Aboriginal language. Its traditional language region is in Western Cape York within the local government areas of Aboriginal Shire of Kowanyama and Shire of Cook, in the catchments of the Coleman River and Mitchell River. Following the removal of Aboriginal people from their traditional lands, it is also spoken in Pormpuraaw and Kowanyama.

== See also ==
- List of rivers of Australia § Queensland
