= Spurgeon, Queensland =

Spurgeon
- Suburb
- Interactive map of Spurgeon
- Coordinates: 16.2119°S 145.0505°E
- Country: Australia
- State: Queensland
- LGA: Shire of Douglas
- Location: 86.6 km (53.8 mi) W of Mossman; 154 km (96 mi) NNW of Cairns; 477 km (296 mi) NNW of Townsville; 1,824 km (1,133 mi) NNW of Brisbane

Government
  - State electorate: Cook
  - Federal division: Leichhardt

Area
  - Total: 98.1 km^{2} (37.9 sq mi)

Population
  - Total: 0 (2021 census)
  - Density: 0.000/km^{2} (0.000/sq mi)
- Time zone: UTC+10:00 (AEST)
- Postcode: 4873
Suburbs around Spurgeon
Lakeland	Dedin	Dedin
Lakeland	Spurgeon	Dedin
Mount Carbine	Mount Carbine	Dedin

Spurgeon is a rural locality in the Shire of Douglas, Queensland, Australia. In the 2021 census, Spurgeon had "no people or a very low population".

== Geography ==
The Great Dividing Range forms the western and southern boundary of the locality. The locality is within the North East Coast drainage basin.

The locality is entirely within the Mount Windsor National Park, part of which is in the Wet Tropics of Queensland, a World Heritage Site.

== Demographics ==
In the 2016 census, Spurgeon had "no people or a very low population".

In the 2021 census, Spurgeon had "no people or a very low population".

== Education ==
There are no schools in Spurgeon, nor nearby. The alternatives are distance education and boarding school.
