= Macalister Range National Park =

National park in Queensland, Australia

Coordinates: 16.699°S 145.572°E

Macalister Range National Park is a protected area of Queensland in Australia. It is within the locality of Wangetti in the Shire of Douglas and within the Macalister Range locality in the Cairns Region and forms part of the Wet Tropics World Heritage Area.

== History ==
The national park was established in 2010 and contains 5,563 hectares (13,750 acres) of important cassowary habitat.
