= Stewart Creek Valley, Queensland =

Stewart Creek Valley
- Suburb
- Interactive map of Stewart Creek Valley
- Coordinates: 16.2911°S 145.3061°E
- Country: Australia
- State: Queensland
- LGA: Shire of Douglas
- Location: 7.5 km (4.7 mi) S of Daintree; 26.2 km (16.3 mi) NNW of Mossman; 118 km (73 mi) NNW of Cairns; 1,811 km (1,125 mi) NNW of Brisbane

Government
  - State electorate: Cook
  - Federal division: Leichhardt

Area
  - Total: 30.1 km^{2} (11.6 sq mi)

Population
  - Total: 24 (2021 census)
  - Density: 0.797/km^{2} (2.07/sq mi)
- Time zone: UTC+10:00 (AEST)
- Postcode: 4873
Suburbs around Stewart Creek Valley
Dagmar	Upper Daintree	Daintree
Dedin	Stewart Creek Valley	Lower Daintree
Dedin	Dedin	Whyanbeel

Stewart Creek Valley is a rural locality in the Shire of Douglas, Queensland, Australia. In the 2021 census, Stewart Creek Valley had a population of 24 people.

== Geography ==
The locality is bounded to the north by the Daintree River. Stewart Creek rises in Dedin to the south-west and enters the locality from the south and then flows north through the locality becoming a tributary of the Daintree River at the locality's northern boundary.

Stewart Creek Road commences at the western end of the neighbouring town of Daintree and enters the locality from the north-east and loosely follows Stewart Creek, mostly to the east of the creek.

The land use is predominantly grazing on native vegetation with small amounts of crop growing and rural residential housing.

== History ==
In 1879, John, Archie and Gavin Stewart were the first settlers in the Daintree area.

Twyford Provisional School opened in 1938, noting that the name Stewart's Creek State School was already in use for a school in Stewart's Creek (now called Stuart) in Townsville . The school name being different to the locality name led to a proposal that the locality be renamed Twyford, as mail sent to Stewart's Creek was often wrongly delivered to the Stewart's Creek Gaol in Townsville, leading to delays, but the locality name was not changed. The school closed at the start of 1942 due to low student numbers.

In 1952, the Twyford telephone exchange was installed. In 1953, a new post office was built.

== Demographics ==
In the 2016 census, Stewart Creek Valley had a population of 18 people.

In the 2021 census, Stewart Creek Valley had a population of 24 people.

== Education ==
There are no schools in Stewart Creek Valley. The nearest government primary school is Daintree State School in neighbouring Daintree to the north-east. The nearest government secondary school is Mossman State High School in Mossman to the south. There is also a Catholic primary school in Mossman.

== Popular culture ==
The film "The Thin Red Line" set in World War II was filmed in Stewarts's Creek in 1997 and released in 1998.
