= Errk Oykangand National Park =

National park in Queensland, Australia

- IUCN category II (national park)
- Location within Queensland
- Location: Queensland
- Nearest city: Normanton
- Coordinates: 15°28′10″S 142°05′07″E
- Area: 371 km^{2} (143 sq mi)
- Established: 1977
- Governing body: Queensland Parks and Wildlife Service

Errk Oykangand (formerly known as Mitchell-Alice Rivers until 2009) is a national park in Queensland, Australia, 1748 km northwest of Brisbane. Today, this protected area is jointly managed by the Queensland government and the traditional Aboriginal owners, the Kunjen and Oykangand People.

The park has a tropical climate and temperatures exceed 30 degrees Celsius all year round.

== Wildlife ==
214 species of animals have been recorded in the park, of which 2 are endangered and 211 species of plants.

== See also ==
- Protected areas of Queensland
