= Mount Carbine, Queensland =

Mount Carbine
- Town
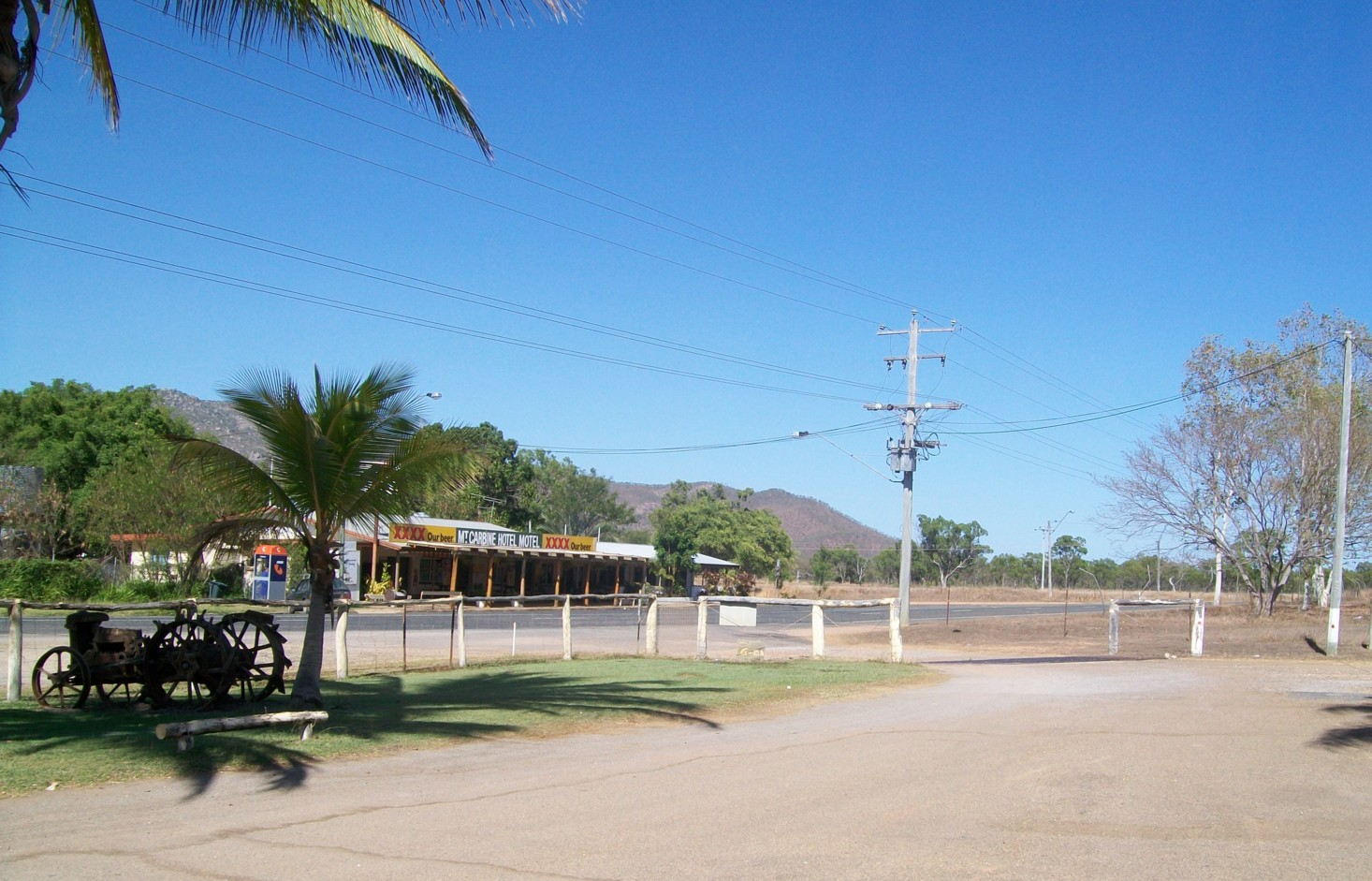
- View from the service station on the eastern side of the Mulligan Highway across to the Mount Carbine hotel on the western side.

- Interactive map of Mount Carbine
- Coordinates: 16.5276°S 145.1341°E
- Country: Australia
- State: Queensland
- LGA: Shire of Mareeba
- Location: 30.0 km (18.6 mi) NW of Mount Molloy; 65.4 km (40.6 mi) W of Mossman; 70.4 km (43.7 mi) NNW of Mareeba; 133 km (83 mi) NW of Cairns; 1,804 km (1,121 mi) NNW of Brisbane

Government
  - State electorate: Cook
  - Federal division: Leichhardt

Area
  - Total: 997.2 km^{2} (385.0 sq mi)

Population
  - Total: 94 (2021 census)
  - Density: 0.0943/km^{2} (0.2441/sq mi)
- Time zone: UTC+10:00 (AEST)
- Postcode: 4871
Localities around Mount Carbine
Lakeland	Spurgeon	Dedin
Desailly; Hurricane	Mount Carbine	Syndicate; Shannonvale
Mount Mulligan	Southedge	Julatten; Mount Molloy

Mount Carbine is a rural town and locality in the Shire of Mareeba, Queensland, Australia. In the 2021 census, the locality of Mount Carbine had a population of 94 people.

== Geography ==
The locality is bounded to the east by the ridge of the Great Dividing Range.

The Mitchell River enters the locality from the west (Hurricane) where it forms part of the western boundary of the locality, before flowing east and forming part of the southern boundary. It then exits to the south (Southedge). The Mcleod River forms part of the western boundary on its confluence with the Mitchell River.

The north and east of the locality are within a number of protected areas (from north to south):

- Mount Windsor National Park
- Mount Lewis National Park
- Mount Spurgeon National Park

A further 600 square kilometres (230 sq mi) comprising most of the south and west of the locality is part of the Brooklyn Sanctuary, a nature reserve owned and operated by the not-for-profit Australian Wildlife Conservancy. The sanctuary includes some former mine sites.

Almost all of the locality is used for nature conservation. The exceptions include what remains of the town of Mount Carbine in the south of the locality and some farms around Butcher Creek and Mary Creek, mostly engaged in grazing on native vegetation.

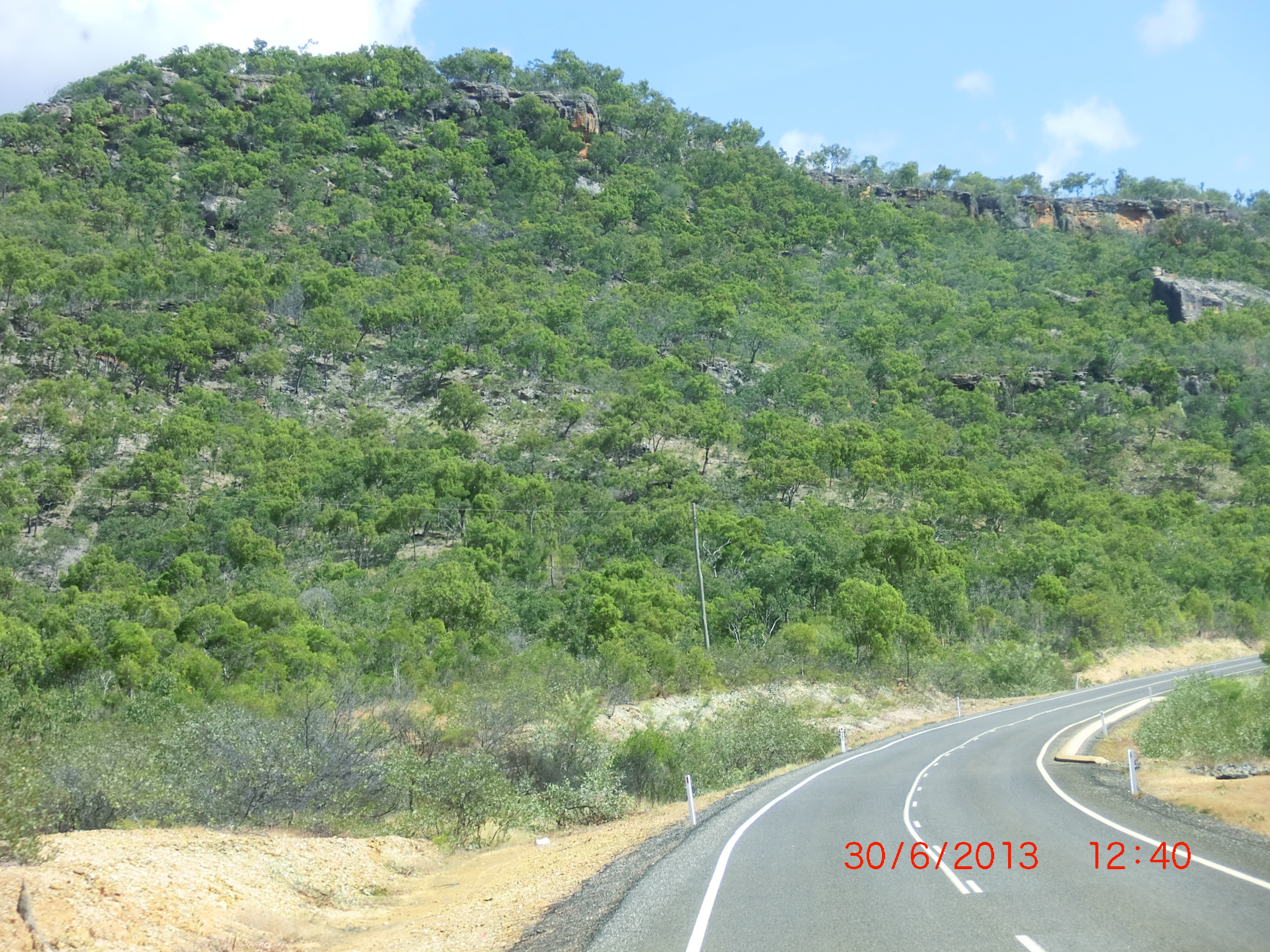
Mulligan Highway through Mount Carbine, 2013

The Mulligan Highway enters the locality from the south-east (Mount Molloy), passes through the town, and exits to the west (Desailly).

Mount Carbine has the following mountains:

- Carbine Hill (Pulchun) (16.5177°S 145.1292°E) 513 metres (1,683 ft)
- Lighthouse Mountain (Cudgee Cudgee) (16.6450°S 145.2141°E) 812 metres (2,664 ft)
- Little Alto (16.5725°S 145.1319°E) 465 metres (1,526 ft)
- Mount Alto (16.5528°S 145.1050°E) 765 metres (2,510 ft)
- Mount Armit (16.3447°S 145.1242°E) 794 metres (2,605 ft)
- Mount Fraser (16.6108°S 145.2859°E) 1,155 metres (3,789 ft)
- Mount Misery (16.4370°S 145.2090°E) 1,246 metres (4,088 ft)
- Mount Spurgeon (16.4376°S 145.2010°E) 1,322 metres (4,337 ft)
- Ords Hill (16.6055°S 145.2025°E) 477 metres (1,565 ft)
- Roots Mount (16.4291°S 145.1983°E) 1,331 metres (4,367 ft)

== History ==
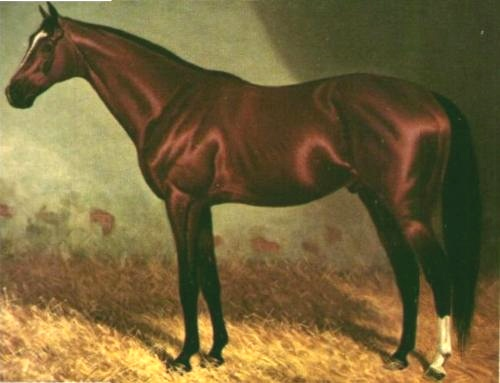
Carbine, the race horse, circa 1897

The town of Mount Carbine is said to be named after the horse Carbine that won the 1890 Melbourne Cup. The town had been first settled around that time by those who had come to mine the wolfram (tungsten), discovered here that same year. These early miners, perhaps believing that their new settlement would become well known for its wealth, apparently decided that the famous Cup winner’s name was the most suitable.

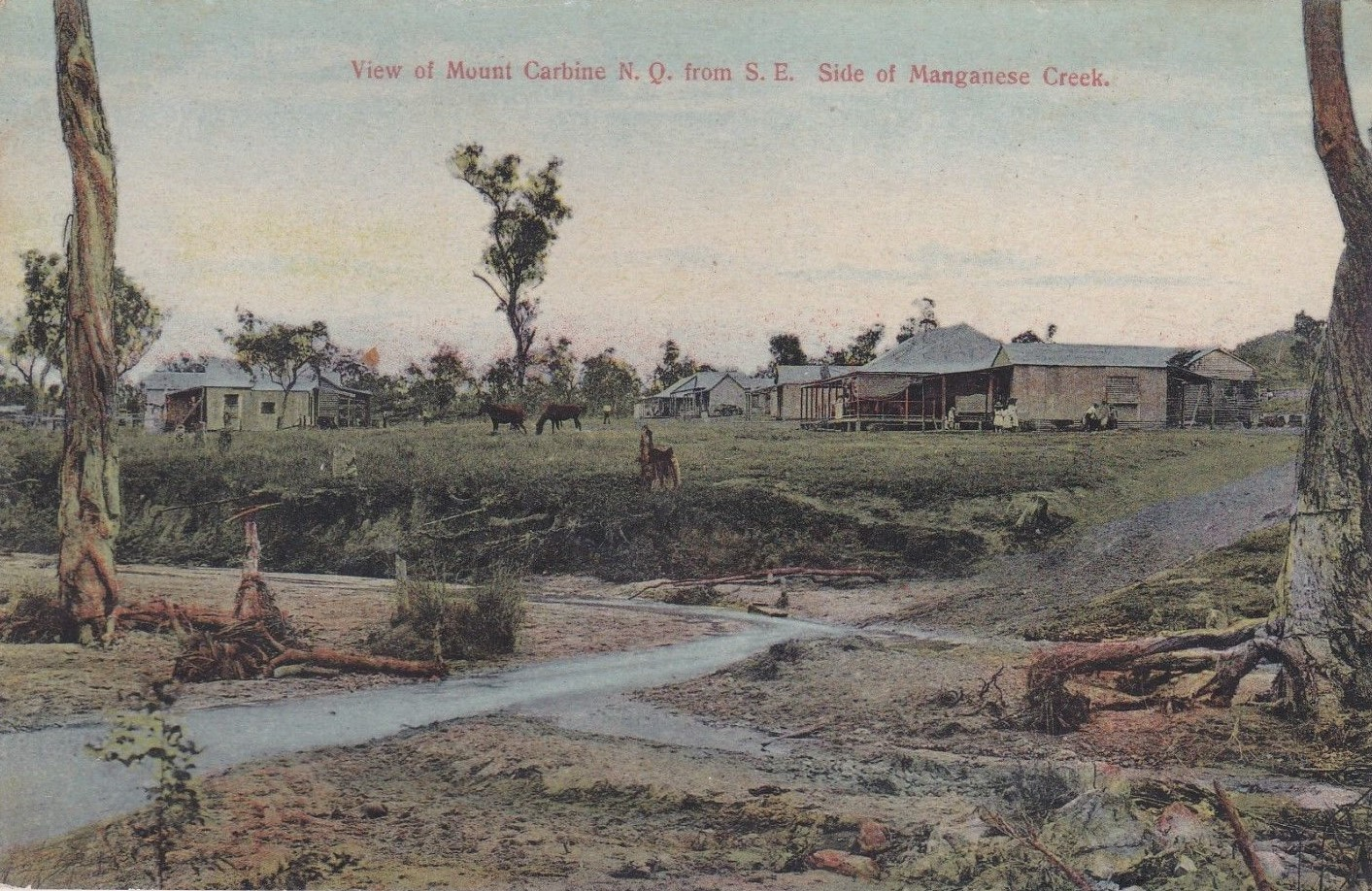
View of Mount Carbine, Nth Qld from south-east side of Manganese Creek, early 1900s

In its early years, the town was entirely reliant upon the area’s wolfram deposits for its viability. The main period of growth in mining was from 1907, with John Moffat’s Irvinebank Company undertaking the major development of the mines. In this early period, Mount Carbine’s residents were predominantly those who were associated in some way with the wolfram mines, as well as their families. Mine production expanded quite rapidly in the period up to World War I and at its height the town had about 300 residents along with three hotels, a police station and a school as well as a range of small businesses. Mount Carbine’s mines ceased operations in 1914, but were reopened after World War I, thereafter being worked intermittently, depending the level of demand and price. But during the 1920s, demand slowed substantially rendering the mines uneconomic. There was however another brief period of resurgence towards the end of the 1960s with mining again being undertaken. This lasted for some twenty years before the mines were again closed in the 1980s. The surviving useful plant and equipment was subsequently sold progressively or otherwise disposed of, mainly during the early 1990s. Over time, as with other similar mining areas, progressive rehabilitation of the old mine sites has been undertaken.

Mount Carbine Post Office opened by September 1907 (a receiving office had been open from 1906) and closed in 1970.

Mount Carbine Provisional School opened in 1908, becoming Mount Carbine State School on 1 January 1909. It closed due to low student numbers in 1927. It re-opened in 1939, closing permanently in 1957. It was on the western side of Pump Road (approx 16.5302°S 145.1321°E).

Brooklyn Sanctuary was purchased in 2004.

Between 2008 and 2013, Mount Carbine was within the Tablelands Region.

== Demographics ==
In the 2006 census, the locality of Mount Carbine had a population of 91 people.

In the 2016 census, the locality of Mount Carbine had a population of 101 people.

In the 2021 census, the locality of Mount Carbine had a population of 94 people.

== Education ==
There are no schools in Mount Carbine. The nearest government primary school is Mount Molloy State School in neighbouring Mount Molloy to the south-east. The nearest government secondary school is Mossman State High School in Mossman to the east. Given the size of the locality, some parts of the locality may be too distant from these schools for a daily commute; alternatives would be distance education and boarding school.

== Amenities ==
The town has a hotel / motel, a roadhouse, and a caravan park.

Mt Carbine Cemetery is on Cemetery Road south of the Mulligan Highway (16.5290°S 145.1121°E). It is operated by the Mareeba Shire Council.
