= Mount Molloy, Queensland =

Mount Molloy
- Town
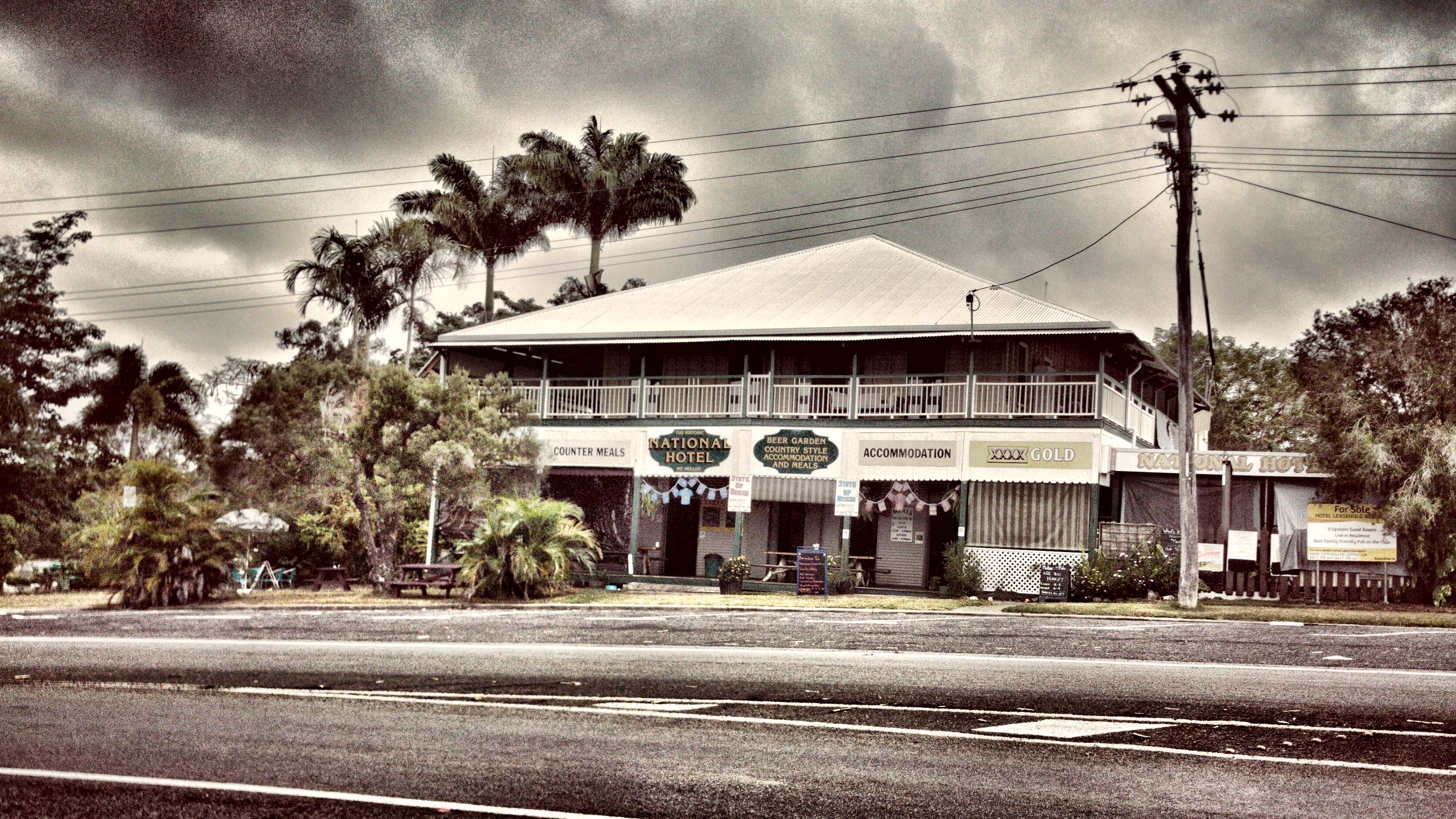
- National Hotel, Mount Molloy, 2017

- Interactive map of Mount Molloy
- Coordinates: 16.6743°S 145.3305°E
- Country: Australia
- State: Queensland
- LGA: Shire of Mareeba
- Location: 36.1 km (22.4 mi) S of Mossman; 42.7 km (26.5 mi) N of Mareeba; 104 km (65 mi) NW of Cairns; 1,761 km (1,094 mi) NNW of Brisbane
- Established: 1906

Government
  - State electorate: Cook
  - Federal division: Leichhardt

Area
  - Total: 252.9 km^{2} (97.6 sq mi)

Population
  - Total: 266 (2021 census)
  - Density: 1.0518/km^{2} (2.724/sq mi)
- Time zone: UTC+10:00 (AEST)
- Postcode: 4871
Localities around Mount Molloy
Mount Carbine	Julatten	Mowbray
Southedge	Mount Molloy	Mona Mona
Southedge	Biboohra	Mona Mona

Mount Molloy is a rural town and locality in the Shire of Mareeba, Queensland, Australia. It is a historic mining and timber town, 55 kilometres (34 mi) north of Cairns. The dominant industry in the area is cattle grazing; the town itself consists of a few shops and an old hotel. In the 2021 census, the locality of Mount Molloy had a population of 266 people.

== Geography ==
Mount Molloy lies within both the Mitchell River and Barron River water catchment areas. Nearby towns are Julatten, Mount Carbine and Mount Mulligan. Quaid Road terminates south of Mount Molloy. The town lies in the western part of the locality, with the central and eastern part protected within Kuranda National Park and the Kuranda West Forest Reserve.

== History ==
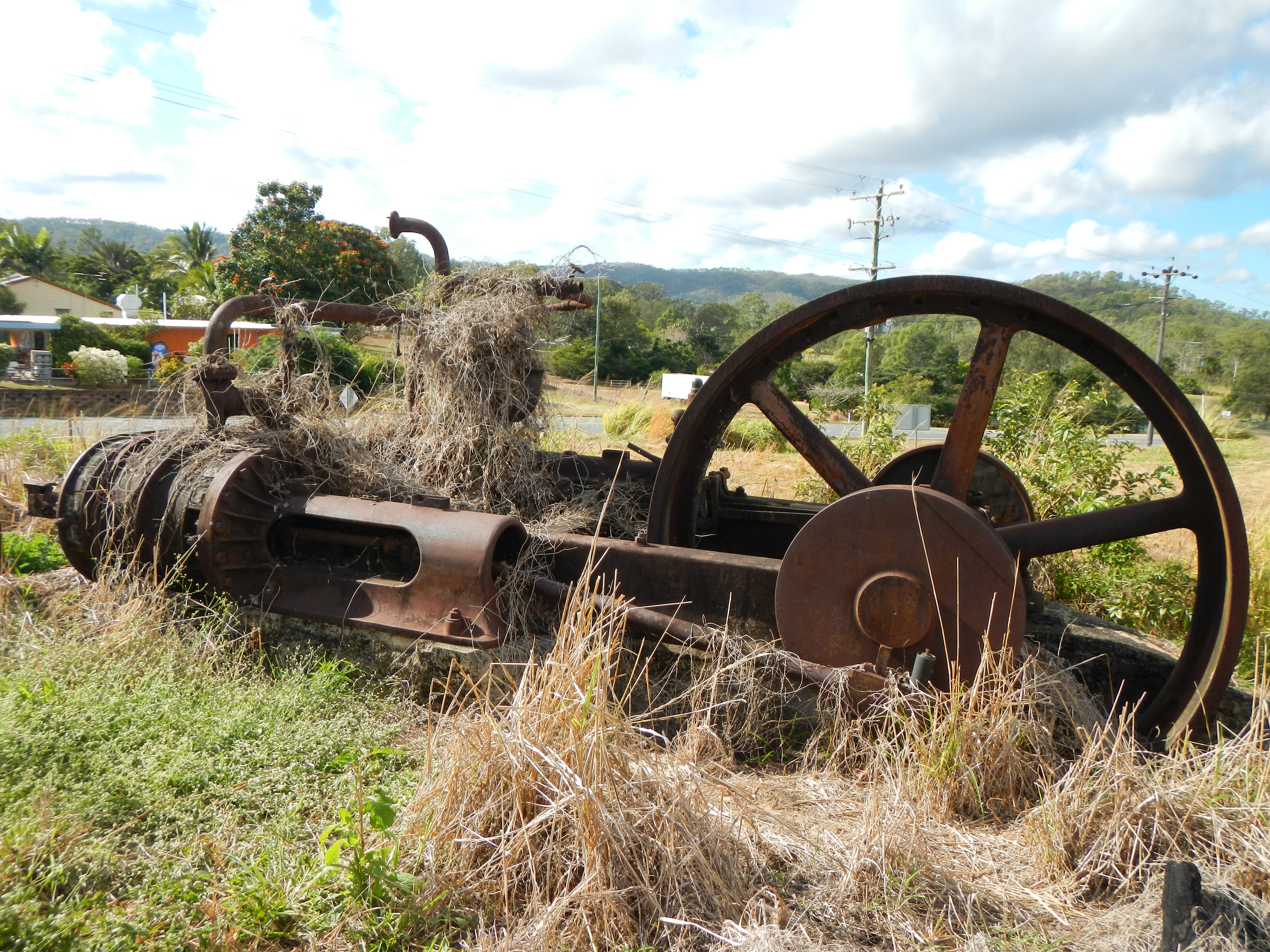
Abandoned mining equipment

Djabugay (also known as Djabuganjdji, Tjupakai) is a language of Far North Queensland, particularly the area around the Kuranda Range and Barron River Catchment. The Djabugay language region includes the land within the local government boundary of Cairns Regional Council.

Mount Molloy was named after Patrick Molloy, an early teamster for a stock route and the person who discovered copper at what was to become Mount Molloy in 1885.

At its height, in the 1890s, Mount Molloy was a copper mining town. It was commonly used as camping grounds, and Chinese market gardeners used to grow grain and other foodstuffs for the miners nearby.

Molloy Post Office opened by July 1905; it was renamed Mount Molloy in 1982.

Mount Molloy School of Arts officially opened on Monday 13 November 1905. It was 60 by 50 feet (18 by 15 m).

Mount Molloy Provisional School opened on 23 July 1906 at Bakers Road. By June 1907, it had enrolment of 75 students with an average daily attendance of 60 students. It became Mount Molloy State School on 1 January 1909. It was relocated on two occasions due to flooding, officially opened in 1976 at its current location.

A private railway was constructed to Mount Molloy, junctioning from the Cairns to Mareeba line at Biboohra, opening in August 1908. It was built by Mount Molloy Ltd to serve its smelters. Ownership was transferred to Queensland Railways on 1 March 1917 following the liquidation of the company, and the line was extended to Rumula on 5 December 1926. The branch closed on 1 May 1964.

Between 2008 and 2013, Mount Molloy (and the rest of the Shire of Mareeba) was within the Tablelands Region.

== Demographics ==
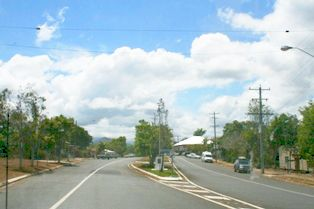
Mount Molloy streetscape, 2012

In the 2011 census, the locality of Mount Molloy had a population of 273 people.

In the 2016 census, the locality of Mount Molloy had a population of 254 people.

In the 2021 census, the locality of Mount Molloy had a population of 266 people.

== Heritage listings ==
Mount Molloy has a number of heritage-listed sites, including:

- James Venture Mulligan's Grave, Bakers Road (16.6863°S 145.3251°E)
- Johnston's Sawmill Steam Plant, corner of Santowski Crescent and Peninsular Development Road (16.676°S 145.3299°E)

== Education ==
Mount Molloy State School is a government primary (Prep–6) school for boys and girls at 30-40 Fraser Road (16.6737°S 145.3348°E). In 2018, the school had an enrolment of 44 students with 3 teachers and 7 non-teaching staff (4 full-time equivalent).

There is no secondary school in Mount Molloy. The nearest government secondary schools are Mossman State High School in Mossman to the north and Mareeba State High School in Mareeba to the south.

== Community groups ==
The Mount Molloy branch of the Queensland Country Women's Association meets at the CWA Hall at 31 Main Street (Mulligan Highway).
