= Bulleringa National Park =

National park in Australia

- IUCN category II (national park)
- Location within Queensland
- Location: Queensland
- Nearest city: Chillagoe
- Coordinates: 17°34′49″S 143°49′45″E
- Area: 544 km^{2} (210 sq mi)
- Established: 1992
- Governing body: Queensland Parks and Wildlife Service

Bulleringa is a national park in Shire of Mareeba, Queensland, Australia, 1,448 km northwest of Brisbane. The park protects a unique array of vegetation communities and wildlife. The average elevation of the terrain is 325 metres. 170 different species of animals and 360 species of plants have been recorded in the park.

== Facilities ==
Bulleringa has no visitor facilities and there is no public access.

== See also ==
- Protected areas of Queensland
