= Mulligan Highway =

State highway in Queensland, Australia

Mulligan Highway Formerly Cooktown Developmental Road Queensland
- Mulligan Highway (green on black)

General information
- Type: Highway
- Length: 266 km (165 mi)
- Route number(s): State Route 81 (Mareeba to Lakeland); State Route 40 (Lakeland to Cooktown)

Major junctions
- South end: Kennedy Highway, (National Highway 1) Mareeba, Queensland
- Mareeba–Dimbulah Road (State Route 27); Mossman–Mount Molloy Road (State Route 44); Peninsula Developmental Road (State Route 81)
- North end: Charlotte Street, Cooktown, Queensland

Location(s)
- Major settlements: Mount Molloy, Lakeland

Highway system
- Highways in Australia; National Highway • Freeways in Australia; Highways in Queensland

The Mulligan Highway is a state highway in Queensland, Australia. It runs for approximately 266 km between Mareeba and Cooktown, on the east coast of Cape York Peninsula where it terminates. It is signed as State Route 81 from Mareeba to Lakeland and State Route 40 from Lakeland to Cooktown. It is a state-controlled regional road (numbers 34A, 34B and 34C).

Named after bushman James Venture Mulligan the sealed highway follows the old Cooktown Developmental Road and was completed in 2006. Since it was sealed, travelling time from Cairns to Cooktown has reduced from 6 to 3½ hours.

== List of towns along the highway ==
- Mount Molloy
- Lakeland

== Linked state-controlled roads ==
In addition to the Peninsula Developmental Road, the following state-controlled roads are linked to this road:

- Mareeba–Dimbulah Road
- Mossman–Mount Molloy Road

== Mareeba–Dimbulah Road ==
Mareeba–Dimbulah Road
- Location: Mulligan Highway, Mareeba to Burke Developmental Road, Dimbulah
- Length: 44.5 km (27.7 mi)
- Route number: 27

Mareeba–Dimbulah Road is a state-controlled regional road (number 664). It starts at an intersection with Mulligan Highway (State Route 81) in Mareeba. It runs south-west as State Route 27, for 44.5 kilometres (27.7 mi) to Dimbulah, where it transitions to Burke Developmental Road. The road has no major intersections.

== Major intersections ==
LGA	Location	km	mi	Destinations	Notes
Mareeba	Mareeba	0	0.0	Kennedy Highway (National Route 1) – south – Atherton / east – Kuranda	Southern end of Mulligan Highway (State Route 81)
Mareeba	Mareeba	3.3	2.1	Mareeba Dimbulah Road (State Route 27) – south–west – Dimbulah	
Mareeba	Mount Molloy	43.5	27.0	Mossman Mount Molloy Road (State Route 44) – north – Mossman	
Cook	Lakeland	187	116	Peninsula Developmental Road (State Route 81) – north–west – Laura	State Route 81 continues north-west as Peninsula Developmental Road. Mulligan Highway continues north-east as State Route 40.
Cook	Cooktown	266	165	Charlotte Street – north – Cooktown CBD	Northern end of Mulligan Highway
1.000 mi = 1.609 km; 1.000 km = 0.621 mi: Route transition

== See also ==
- Highways in Australia
- Kalkajaka National Park
- List of highways in Queensland
