= Douglas =

Douglas may refer to:

== People ==
- Douglas (given name)
- Douglas (surname)

== Animals ==
- Douglas (parrot), macaw that starred as the parrot Rosalinda in Pippi Longstocking
- Douglas the camel, a camel in the Confederate Army in the American Civil War

== Businesses ==
- Douglas Aircraft Company
- Douglas (cosmetics), German cosmetics retail chain in Europe
- Douglas Holding, former German company
- Douglas (motorcycles), British motorcycle manufacturer

== Peerage and Baronetage ==
- Duke of Douglas
- Earl of Douglas, or any holder of the title
- Marquess of Douglas, or any holder of the title
- Douglas baronets

== Peoples ==
- Clan Douglas, a Scottish kindred
- Dougla people, West Indians of both African and East Indian heritage

== Places ==
=== Australia ===
- Douglas, Queensland, a suburb of Townsville
- Douglas, Queensland (Toowoomba Region), a locality
- Port Douglas, North Queensland, Australia
- Shire of Douglas, in northern Queensland

=== Canada ===
- Douglas, New Brunswick
- Douglas Parish, New Brunswick
- Douglas, Ontario, a community in Admaston/Bromley township
- Douglas, British Columbia, the community at the Peace Arch border crossing
  - Douglas, the Canadian inspection station of the Peace Arch Border Crossing
- Douglas, Manitoba, a settlement in the Rural Municipality of Elton
- Rural Municipality of Douglas No. 436, Saskatchewan

=== Isle of Man ===
- Douglas, Isle of Man, the capital city and largest settlement of the Isle of Man, and seat of Tynwald
- River Douglas (Isle of Man)

=== New Zealand ===
- Douglas, Taranaki
- Douglas, Canterbury
- Douglas Peak

=== United Kingdom ===
==== England ====
- Douglas (ward), an electoral ward of the Wigan Metropolitan Borough Council
- River Douglas, Lancashire

==== Northern Ireland ====
- Douglas, County Antrim, a townland in County Antrim
- Douglas, County Tyrone, a townland in County Tyrone

==== Scotland ====
- Castle Douglas, Dumfries and Galloway
- Douglas, South Lanarkshire
- Douglas Castle, South Lanarkshire
- Douglas Water, South Lanarkshire
- Glen Douglas, Argyll and Bute
- Douglas, Dundee

=== United States ===
- Douglas, Alabama
- Douglas, Juneau, Alaska
- Douglas, Arizona
- Douglas, Georgia
- Douglasville, Georgia
- Douglas, Illinois (disambiguation), multiple places with the same name
- Douglas, Massachusetts
- Douglas, Michigan
- Douglas, Minnesota, an unincorporated community in Olmsted County
- Douglas, Nebraska
- Douglas, North Dakota
- Douglas, Ohio
- Douglas, Oklahoma
- Douglas, Washington
- Douglas, West Virginia
- Douglas, Wisconsin, a town
  - Douglas Center, Wisconsin, an unincorporated community
- Douglas, Wyoming

=== Elsewhere ===
- Douglas, Belize
- Douglas, South Africa
- Douglas, Cork, a suburb of Cork City, Ireland
- Douglas, Falkland Islands
- Donguila, also known as Douglas, a village in Estuaire Province, Gabon

== Plants ==
- Douglas iris, a wildflower
- Douglas fir, the common name for a type of coniferous tree

== Ships ==
- SS Douglas (1858), a paddle-steamer of the Isle of Man Steam Packet Company which subsequently served military roles
- SS Douglas (1864), the second steamer in the fleet of the Isle of Man Steam Packet Company to bear the name
- SS Douglas (1889), a packet steamer formerly called Dora, acquired in 1901 by the Isle of Man Steam Packet Company
- SS Douglas (1907), a freight vessel built for the Clyde Shipbuilding and Engineering in Port Glasgow for Goole Steam Shipping Company

== Other uses ==
- Douglas (film), a 1970 Norwegian film
- Douglas (locomotive), a preserved locomotive on the Talyllyn Railway in Wales
- Douglas GAA, a Gaelic Athletic Association club from Douglas, Cork, Ireland
- Hannah Gadsby: Douglas, a 2019 live comedy performance by Australian comedian Hannah Gadsby
- Donald and Douglas, a pair of fictional Scottish twin engines from Thomas the Tank Engine and Friends
- Hurricane Douglas, seven northeastern Pacific Ocean tropical cyclones

== See also ==
- Douglas County (disambiguation)
- Douglas House (disambiguation)
- Douglas International Airport (disambiguation)
- Douglas Island (disambiguation)
- Douglas Township (disambiguation)
- Douglas-Daly (disambiguation)
- Camp Douglas (disambiguation)
- Justice Douglas (disambiguation)
- Lord Douglas (disambiguation)
- Mount Douglas (disambiguation)
- Douglass (disambiguation)
- Doug, a given name
