= Craiglie =

- Suburb
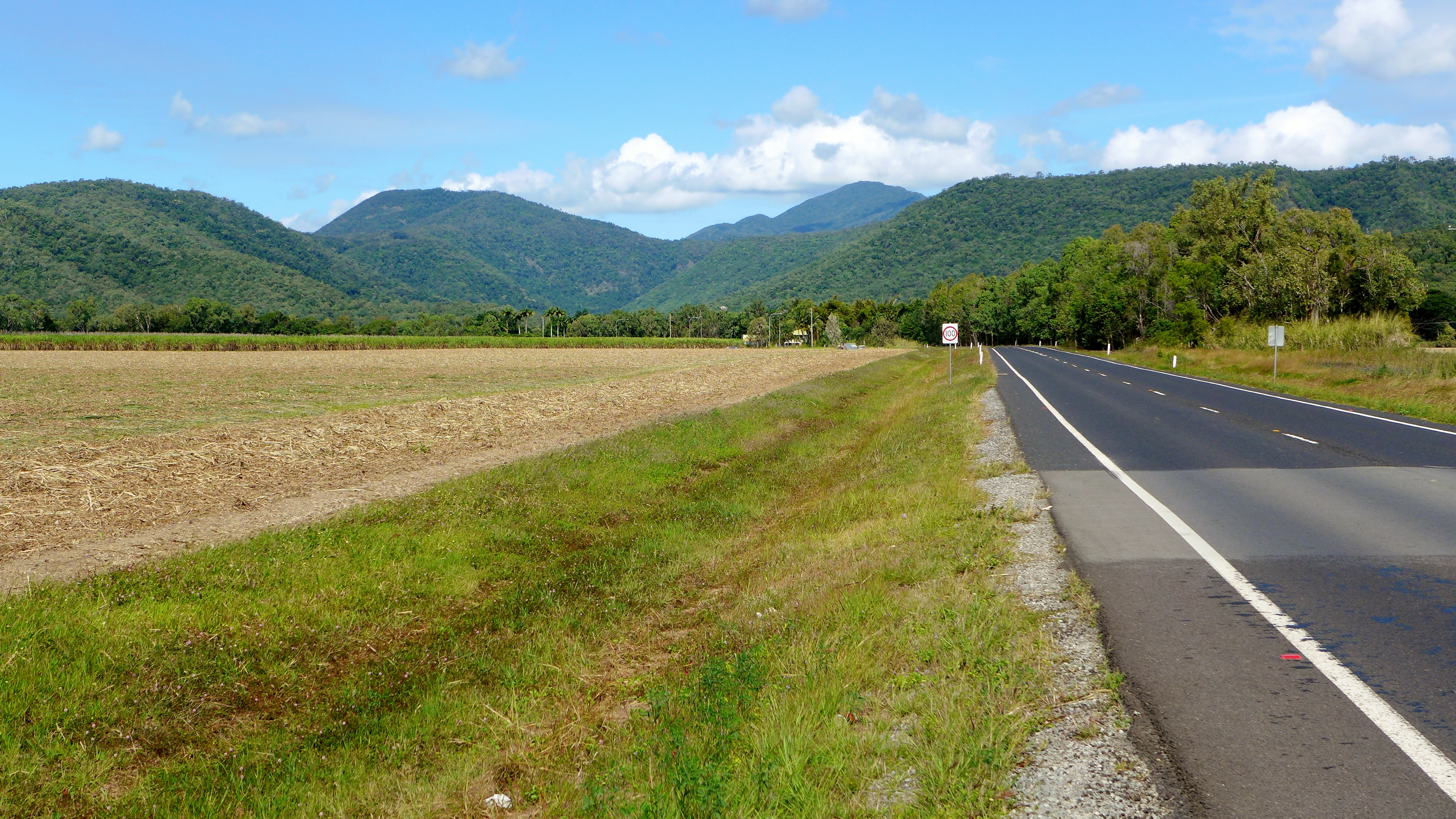
- Captain Cook Highway, Craiglie, 2015

- Interactive map of Craiglie
- Coordinates: 16.5394°S 145.4636°E
- Country: Australia
- State: Queensland
- LGA: Shire of Douglas
- Location: 6.1 km (3.8 mi) S of Port Douglas; 16.1 km (10.0 mi) SE of Mossman; 60.0 km (37.3 mi) NNW of Cairns; 1,846 km (1,147 mi) NNW of Brisbane

Government
  - State electorate: Cook
  - Federal division: Leichhardt

Area
  - Total: 14.0 km^{2} (5.4 sq mi)

Population
  - Total: 1,062 (2021 census)
  - Density: 75.86/km^{2} (196.5/sq mi)
- Time zone: UTC+10:00 (AEST)
- Postcode: 4877
Suburbs around Craiglie
Killaloe	Port Douglas	Coral Sea
Cassowary	Craiglie	Coral Sea
Cassowary	Mowbray	Mowbray

Craiglie is a coastal rural locality in the Shire of Douglas, Queensland, Australia. In the 2021 census, Craiglie had a population of 1,062 people.

== Geography ==
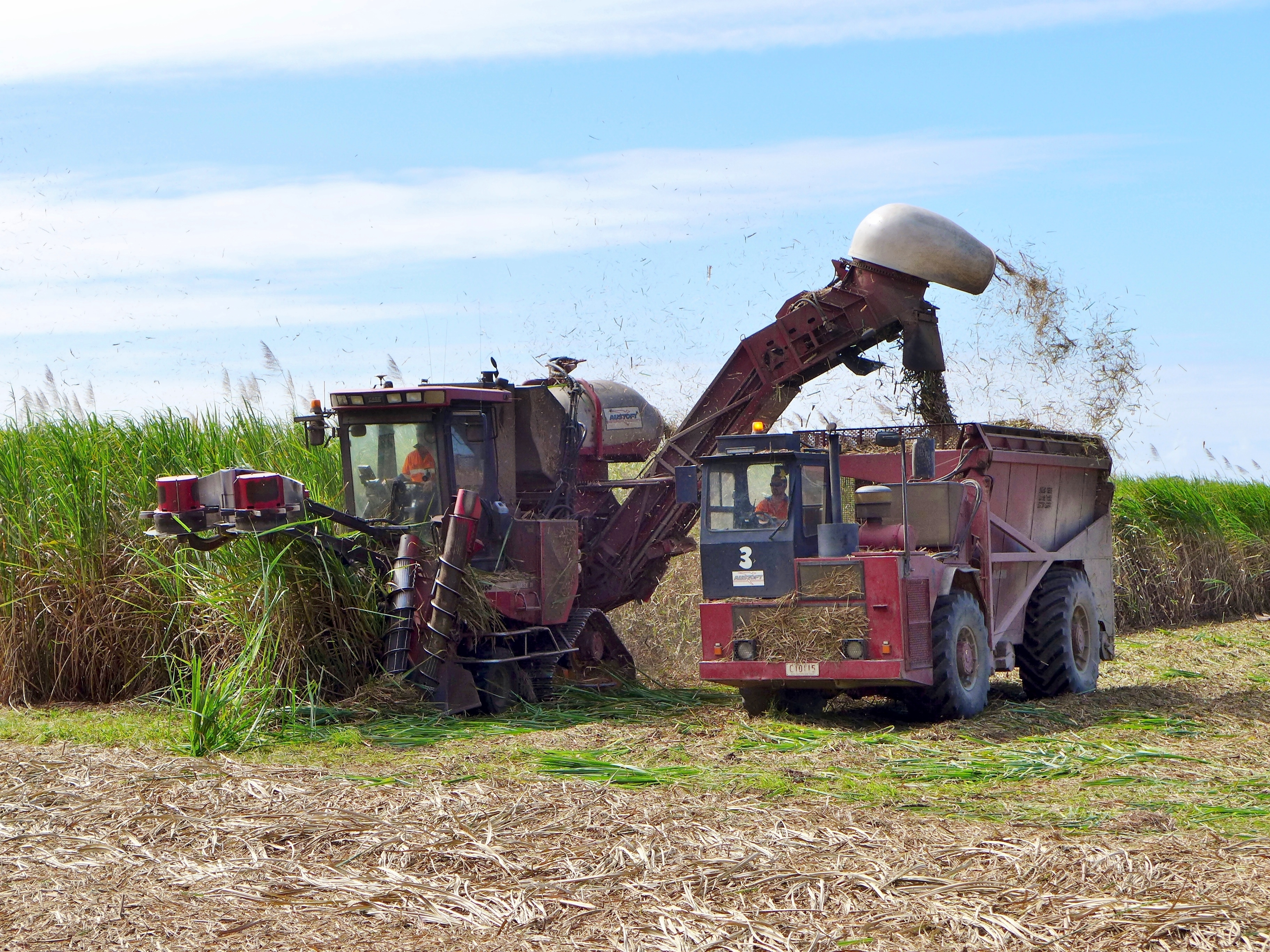
Sugar cane harvesting, Craiglie, 2015

Craiglie is bounded by the Cassowary Range to the southwest, Mowbray River to the southeast and the Coral Sea to the east. The Captain Cook Highway and the cane tramway to the Mossman sugar mill form part of its boundary with Port Douglas to the north.

Historically, Craiglie provided the connection between Port Douglas and The Bump Track which crossed the range. Although it no longer provides access over the range, it remains the access point to Port Douglas, where the Port Douglas Road joins the Captain Cook Highway and it remains a service centre for businesses serving the highway and Port Douglas as well as being an extension of the suburban areas in the south of Port Douglas.

The land use on the low-lying coastal areas is predominantly growing sugarcane.

== History ==
As the motivation for the development of the port at Port Douglas was to transport gold from the Hodgkinson Minerals Area, in 1877 Christie Palmerston created the Bump Track which passed over the Cassowary Range from (present day) Mowbray to (present day) Julatten. Coming from Port Douglas, the teamsters would camp at the base of the range at Four Mile (as Craiglie was then known) before tackling "The Bump". A village formed there to supply services needed by the teamsters, such as hotels, a blacksmith, a saddlery, and a butcher shop. The Bump Track was the only road access to Port Douglas until a coast road (now the Captain Cook Highway) was built to Cairns in 1933. Today the Mossman Mount Molloy Road provides a range crossing from the Captain Cook Highway at Shannonvale/Cassowary to Julatten, and The Bump Track is no longer in use (except for bushwalking and mountain biking).

Craiglie Provisional School opened on 26 March 1888. It was on a 5-acre (2.0 ha) site between the main road and another street and two gullies. Local people wanted to have a state school, but the Queensland Government was not convinced that Craiglie would become a permanent settlement, anticipating that the construction of a future railway line would remove the need for teamsters. However, increasing enrolments at the school necessitating enlarged premises leading to the school being designated Craiglie State School 19 February 1890.

However, the Queensland Government's prophesy was correct, as, in 1893, the Cairns-to-Kuranda railway line bypassed Port Douglas and the Craiglie settlement gradually diminished as businesses and their premises were relocated to more prosperous areas such as Mossman. Eventually, only the school building and its attached teacher's residence remained in the Craiglie settlement. While there were still school-aged children on the farms, the Craiglie school location was no longer central to the areas with students. The families in the Killaloe and Mowbray areas both lobbied for a school in their area.

The persistent lobbying by the residents of Mowbray from 1919 was eventually rewarded with Mowbray River State School opening in 1925.

The Queensland Government decided to close Craiglie school in 1928, replacing it with a new Killaloe State School, which opened on 23 July 1928. The Craiglie school building was not relocated to the Killaloe site as it was then almost forty years old and not in good repair, so a new school building was constructed.

Despite its name, Killaloe State School was on the northern corner of the (now) Captain Cook Highway and Mcclellan Road in present-day Craiglie (approx 16.51096°S 145.44257°E). Killaloe State School closed on 14 July 1935 and its building was relocated to Rocky Point.

== Demographics ==
In the 2016 census, Craiglie had a population of 954 people.

In the 2021 census, Craiglie had a population of 1,062 people.

== Education ==
There are no schools in Craiglie. The nearest government primary school is Port Douglas State School in neighbouring Port Douglas to the north. The nearest government secondary school is Mossman State High School in Mossman to the north-west.
