= Mowbray, Queensland =

Mowbray
- Suburb
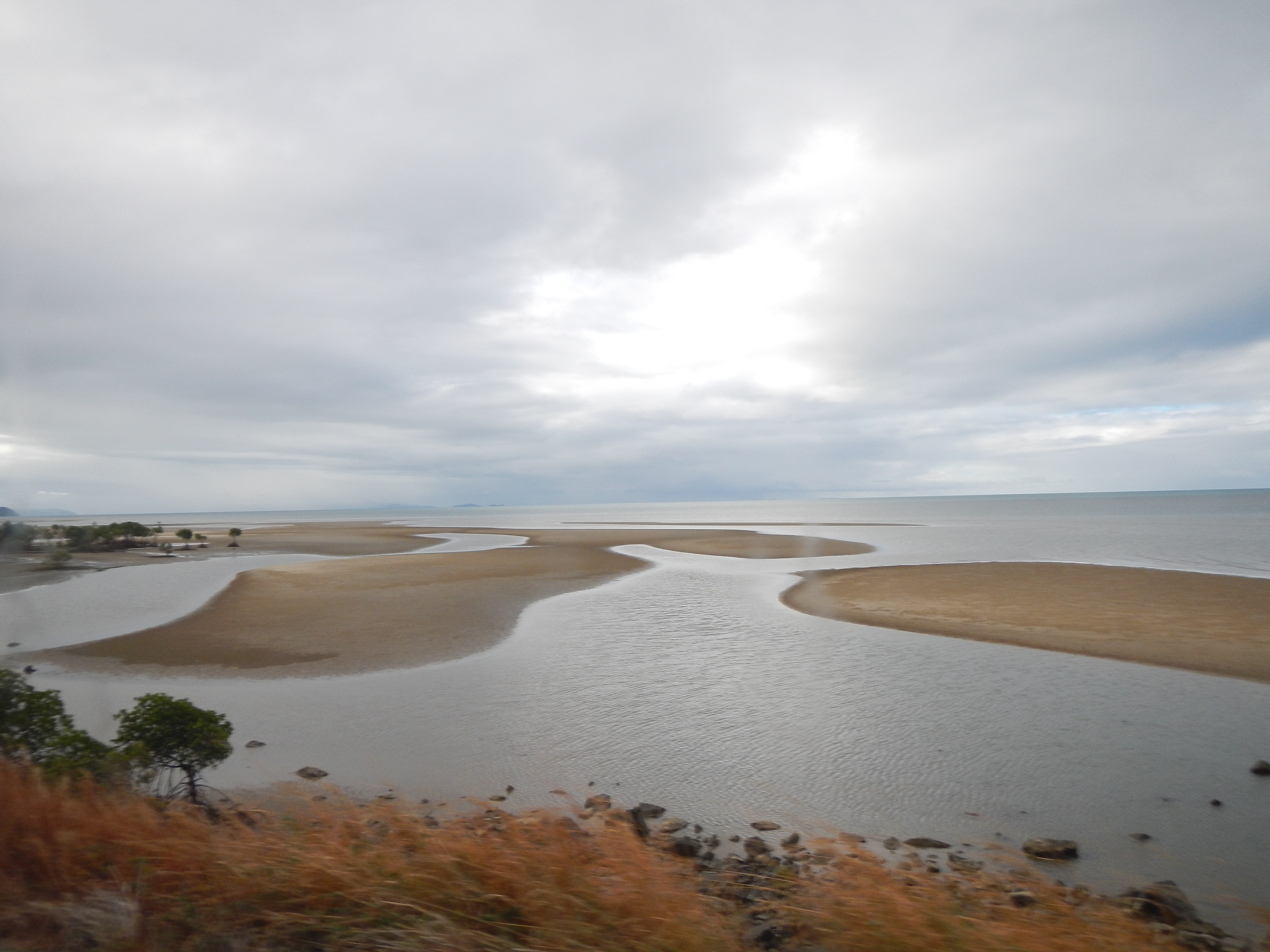
- Beach at Mowbray, 2013

- Interactive map of Mowbray
- Coordinates: 16.595°S 145.4972°E
- Country: Australia
- State: Queensland
- LGA: Shire of Douglas
- Location: 12.6 km (7.8 mi) S of Port Douglas; 21.9 km (13.6 mi) SE of Mossman; 58.2 km (36.2 mi) NW of Cairns; 1,765 km (1,097 mi) NNW of Brisbane

Government
  - State electorate: Cook
  - Federal division: Leichhardt

Area
  - Total: 92.7 km^{2} (35.8 sq mi)

Population
  - Total: 362 (2021 census)
  - Density: 3.905/km^{2} (10.114/sq mi)
- Time zone: UTC+10:00 (AEST)
- Postcode: 4877
Suburbs around Mowbray
Cassowary	Craiglie	Coral Sea
Julatten	Mowbray	Oak Beach; Coral Sea
Mount Molloy	Mona Mona	Wangetti

Mowbray is a coastal locality in the Shire of Douglas, Queensland, Australia. In the 2021 census, Mowbray had a population of 362 people.

== Geography ==
The locality is bounded to the east by Trinity Bay (part of the Coral Sea) and to the south-west by the Great Dividing Range. Oak Beach is a small township along the east coast of Mowbray which has been excised into its own locality.

Most of the terrain in Mowbray is mountainous with a number of named peaks (from north to south):

- Mount Garioch (16.6046°S 145.4995°E) 623 metres (2,044 ft)
- Mount Charlie (16.6227°S 145.5228°E) 572 metres (1,877 ft)
- Harris Peak (also known as Black Mountain) (16.6443°S 145.4899°E) 1,068 metres (3,504 ft)

Most of this mountain terrain is within a number of protected areas: Mowbray Conservation Park and Mowbray National Park to the west (covering the Great Dividing Range) and Macalister Range National Park for the hilly land in the east.

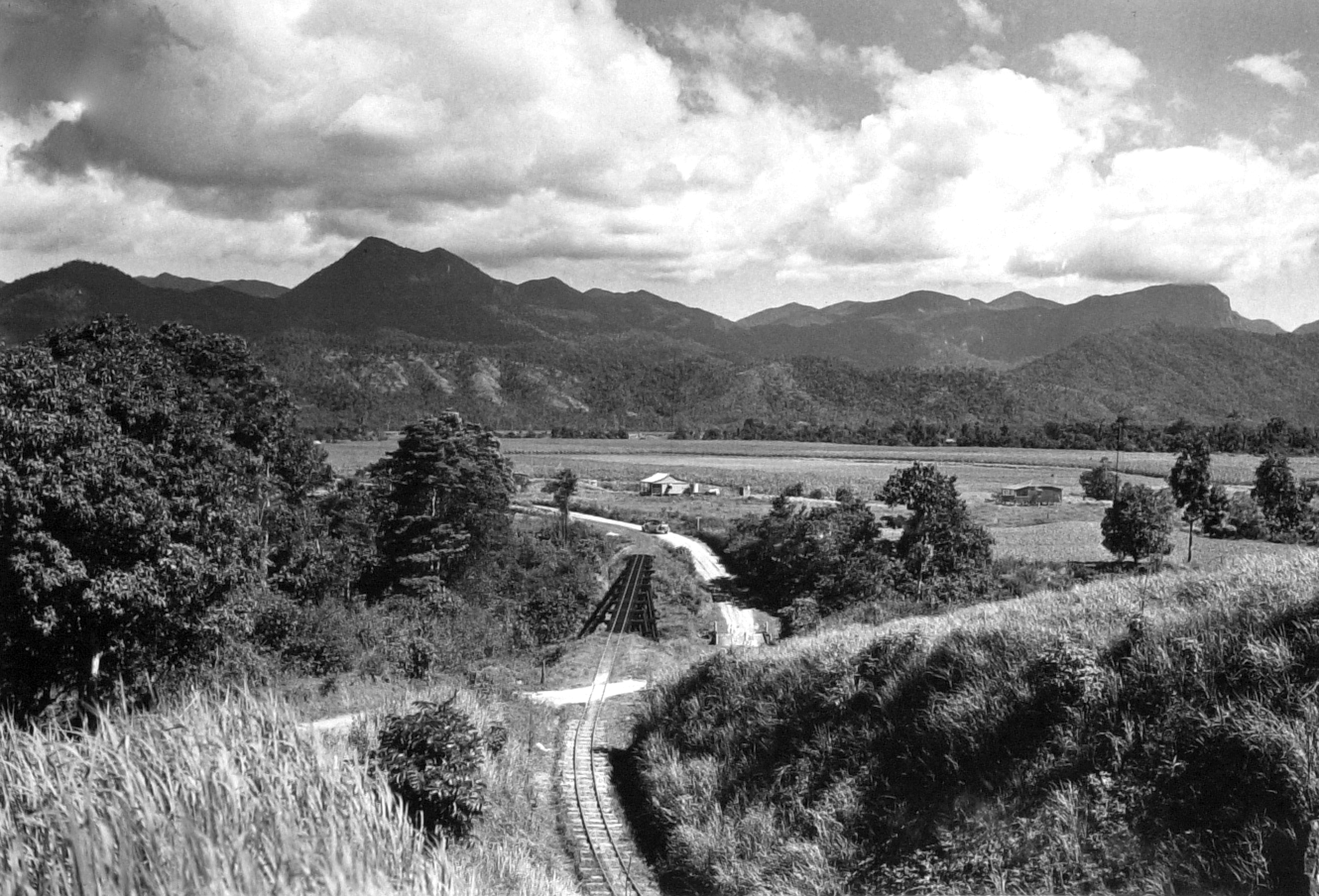
Canefields, Mowbray, 1935

Most of the unprotected land is in the north of the locality around the valleys of the Mowbray River and its tributary Spring Creek. The residential areas are in these valleys. The Captain Cook Highway passes through the locality from south to north, hugging the Trinity Bay coast for much of the way. The low-lying river flats are used to grow sugarcane.

The locality also has coastal features (from north to south):

- Yule Point (16.5746°S 145.5126°E)
- Pebbly Beach (16.5818°S 145.5126°E)
- Oak Beach (16.6009°S 145.5229°E)
- Pretty Beach (formerly known as Little Reef Beach) (16.6132°S 145.5336°E)
- Turtle Creek Beach (16.6285°S 145.5516°E)

== History ==
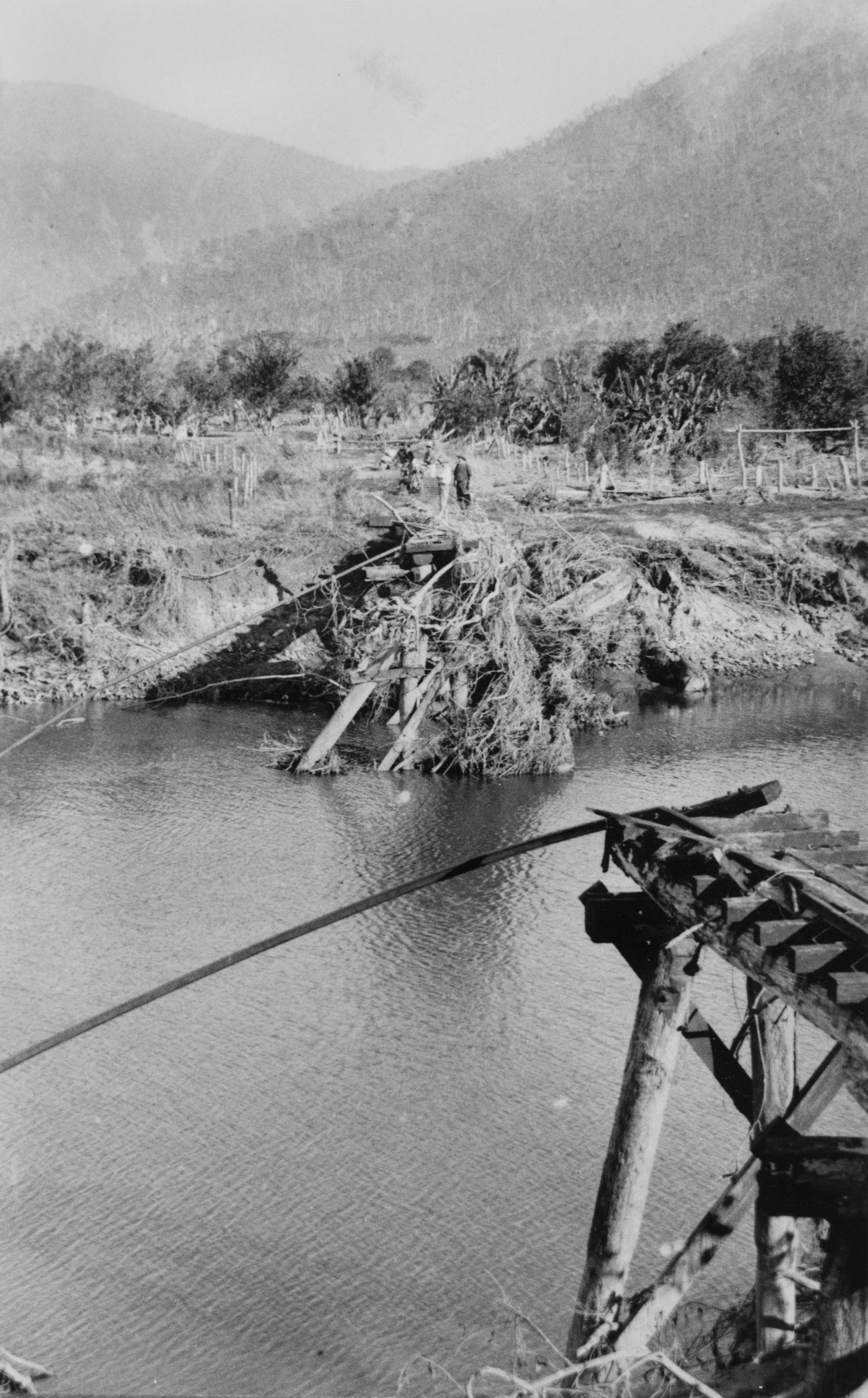
Mowbray Bridge after the 1911 cyclone

The locality of Mowbray was originally known as Mowbray River (which flows through the locality).

On Thursday 16 March 1911, a cyclone hit the area doing considerable damage. The bridge which carried the tramway over the Mowbray River was swept away.

Children from the Mowbray attended the school at Craiglie until that settlement declined and the majority of the children attending the school were from the Mowbray area. Mowbray River State School opened on 20 May 1925 under head teacher Alexander Larcombe Edwards. It had an initial enrolment of 13 students, rising to 21 students by the end of 1925. With fears of a Japanese invasion in 1942, many families evacuated and by March 1942 with only 2 students enrolled, the school was closed. In March 1944, the school reopened with 15 students. In 1961, the school had only 8 students at a time when the Queensland Education Department was introducing a new approach where bus transport would be provided for students to attend schools in larger centres. The school closed permanently at the end of 1961. In 1963, there was an auction selling the school's 5-acre site and building. The school was at 264 Mowbray River Road (16.56561°S 145.46745°E).The school building is still on the site, forming part of a house.

== Demographics ==
In the 2016 census, Mowbray had a population of 321 people.

In the 2021 census, Mowbray had a population of 362 people.

== Education ==
There are no schools in Mowbray. The nearest government primary school is Port Douglas State School in Port Douglas to the north. The nearest government secondary school is Mossman State High School in Mossman to the north-west.
