= Julatten, Queensland =

Julatten
- Town
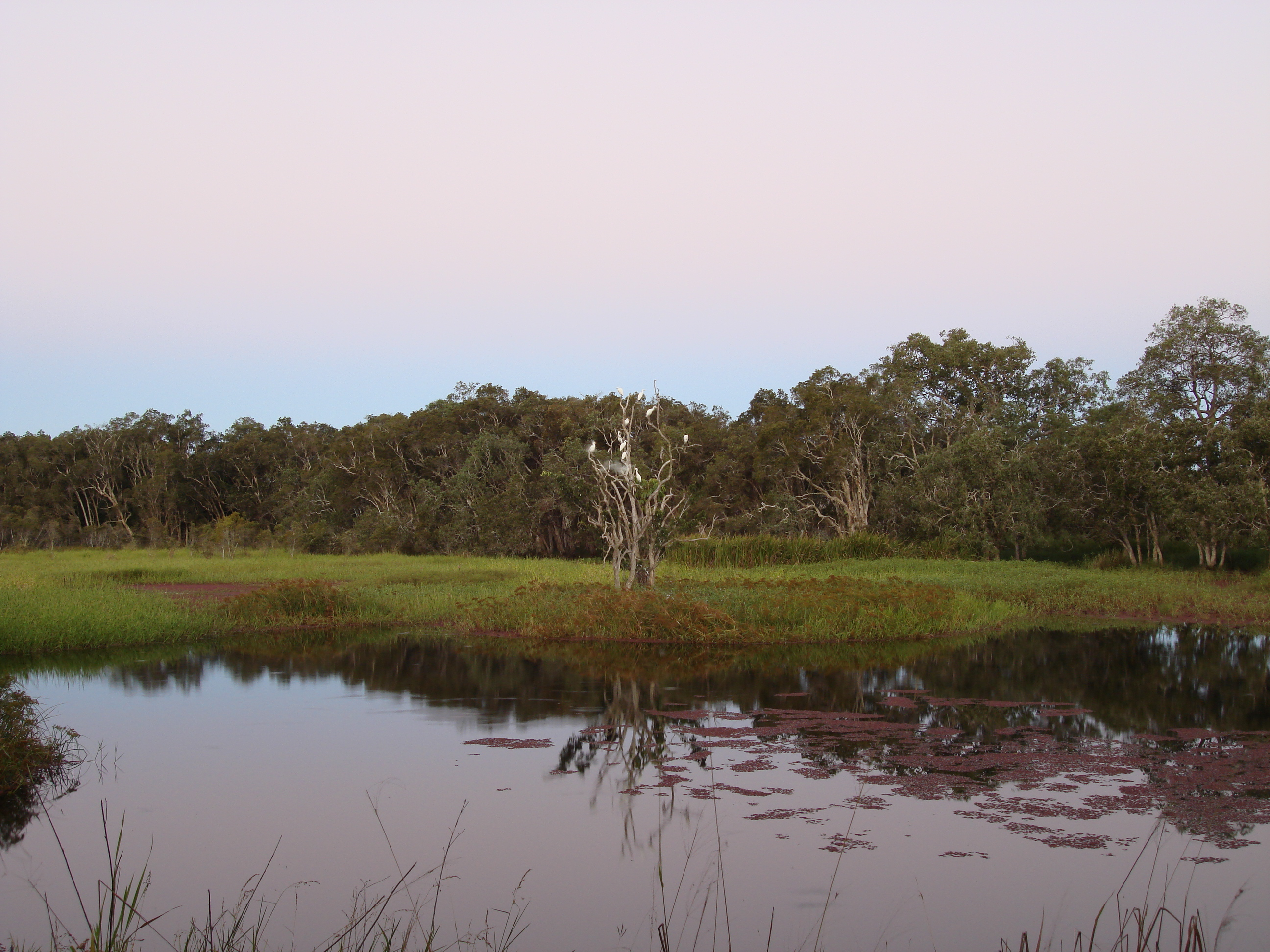
- Lascar Abattoir Swamp, Julatten, 2008

- Interactive map of Julatten
- Coordinates: 16.6069°S 145.3430°E
- Country: Australia
- State: Queensland
- LGA: Shire of Mareeba
- Location: 21.1 km (13.1 mi) S of Mossman; 31.3 km (19.4 mi) SW of Port Douglas; 58.6 km (36.4 mi) N of Mareeba; 87.7 km (54.5 mi) NW of Cairns; 1,777 km (1,104 mi) NNW of Brisbane

Government
  - State electorate: Cook
  - Federal division: Kennedy

Area
  - Total: 154.0 km^{2} (59.5 sq mi)

Population
  - Total: 1,020 (2021 census)
  - Density: 6.62/km^{2} (17.15/sq mi)
- Time zone: UTC+10:00 (AEST)
- Postcode: 4871
Localities around Julatten
Shannonvale	Shannonvale	Cassowary
Mount Carbine	Julatten	Mowbray
Mount Molloy	Mount Molloy	Mount Molloy

Julatten is a rural town and locality in the Shire of Mareeba, Queensland, Australia. In the 2021 census, the locality of Julatten had a population of 1,020 people.

== Geography ==
Julatten is on the eastern edge of the Atherton Tableland (about 450 metres (1,476 ft) above sea level). The steep north-eastern part of the locality consists of protected areas being the Mount Lewis National Park and the Mowbray National Park.

The Mossman - Mount Molloy Road (also known as the Rex Range Road) traverses the locality from the north-east on the coastal plain up to the south-west passing through the area of Julatten on the tableland.

Julatten produces sugar cane and beef cattle and has barramundi farms.

== History ==
The area, which was settled in the early 1920s and originally known as Bushy Creek, takes its name from the railway station, which in turn was named by the Queensland Railways Department and is an Aboriginal word meaning small creek. The railway was opened to Rumula on 5 December 1926.

Bushy Creek State School opened on 27 August 1923. It was renamed Julatten State School in 1975.

In 1926, Charles May of Mossman proposed that a road should be built across the Great Dividing Range to connect Julatten with Mossman. After difficulties in choosing a route, The Mossman - Mount Molloy Road was officially opened on 2 January 1949 by the Queensland Minister for Agriculture Harold Collins. It was also named the Rex Range Road in honour of R.D. Rex, the Chairman of Douglas Shire who persisted in his efforts to see the road built. In January 2020, a memorial to Charles May was established on a lookout.

Euluma State School opened circa 1935 and closed circa 1951.

== Demographics ==
In the 2016 census, the locality of Julatten had a population of 1,091 people.

In the 2021 census, the locality of Julatten had a population of 1,020 people.

== Education ==
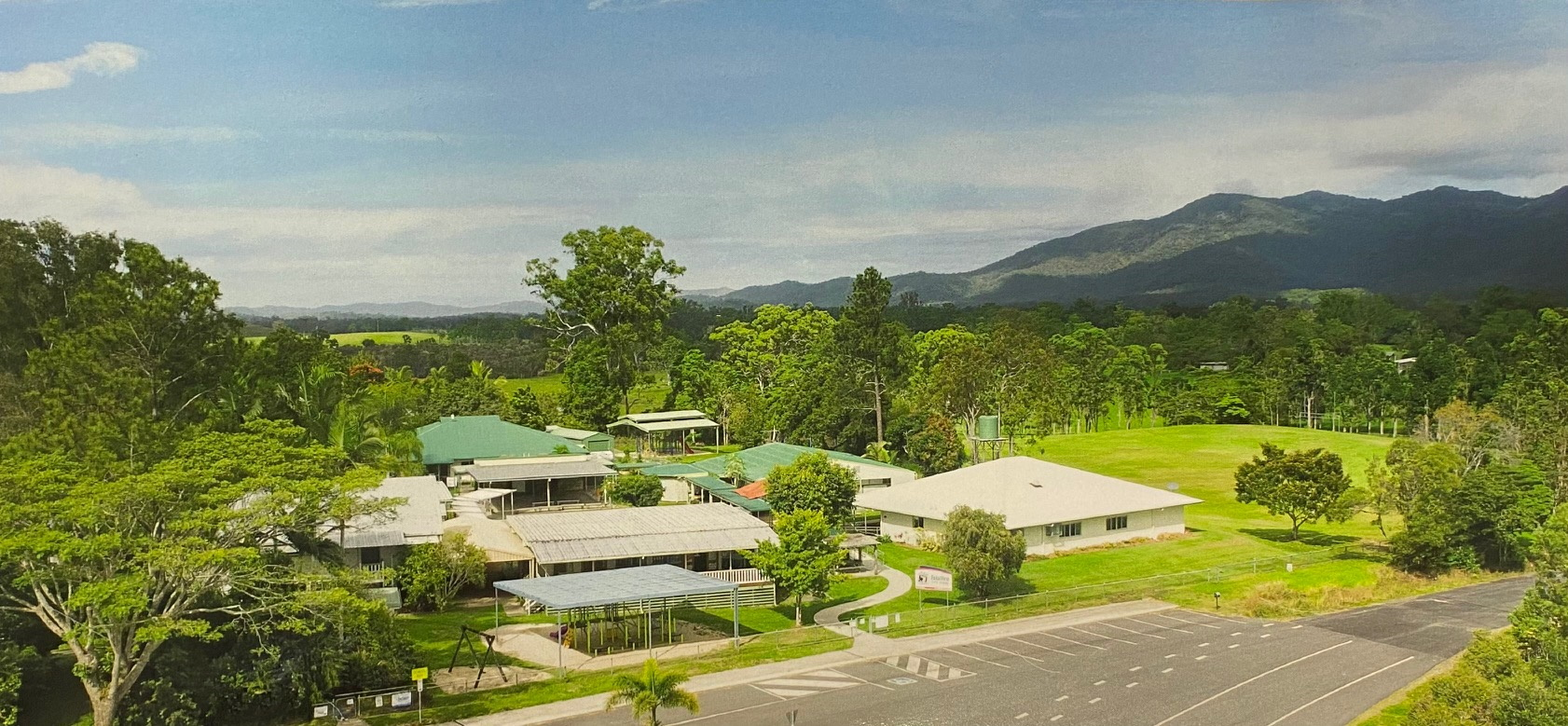
Julatten State School, 2023

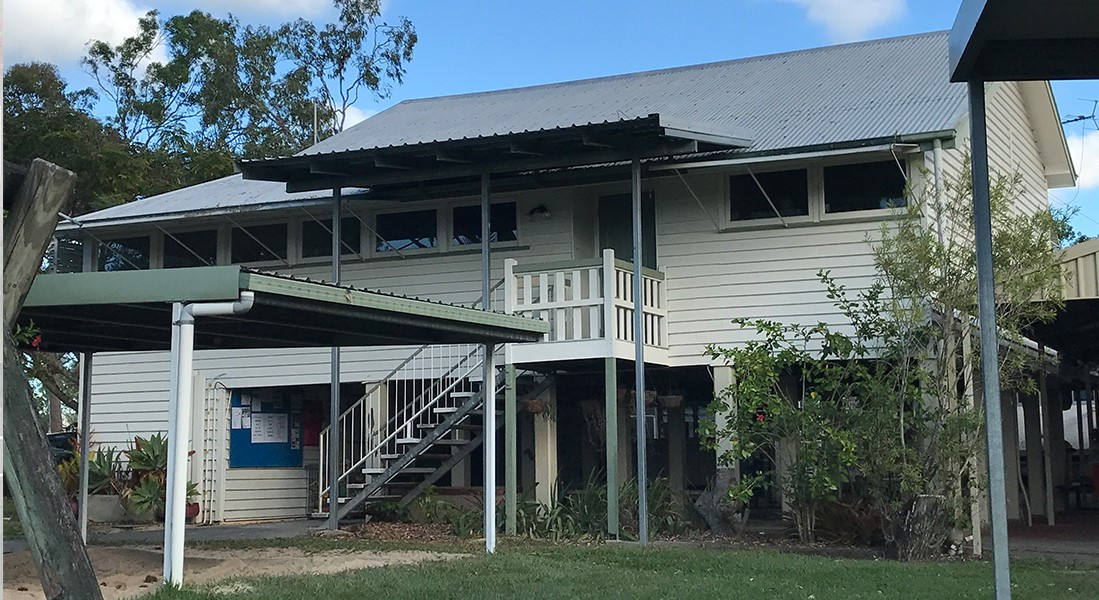
Julatten State School, 2025

Julatten State School is a government primary (Prep-6) school for boys and girls at 1141 Euluma Creek Road (16.6077°S 145.3421°E). In 2016, the school had an enrolment of 69 students with 6 teachers (4 full-time equivalent) and 6 non-teaching staff (4 full-time equivalent). In 2018, the school had an enrolment of 57 students with 5 teachers (4 full-time equivalent) and 5 non-teaching staff (3 full-time equivalent).

There are no secondary schools in Julatten. The nearest government secondary school is Mossman State High School in Mossman to the north.

== Attractions ==
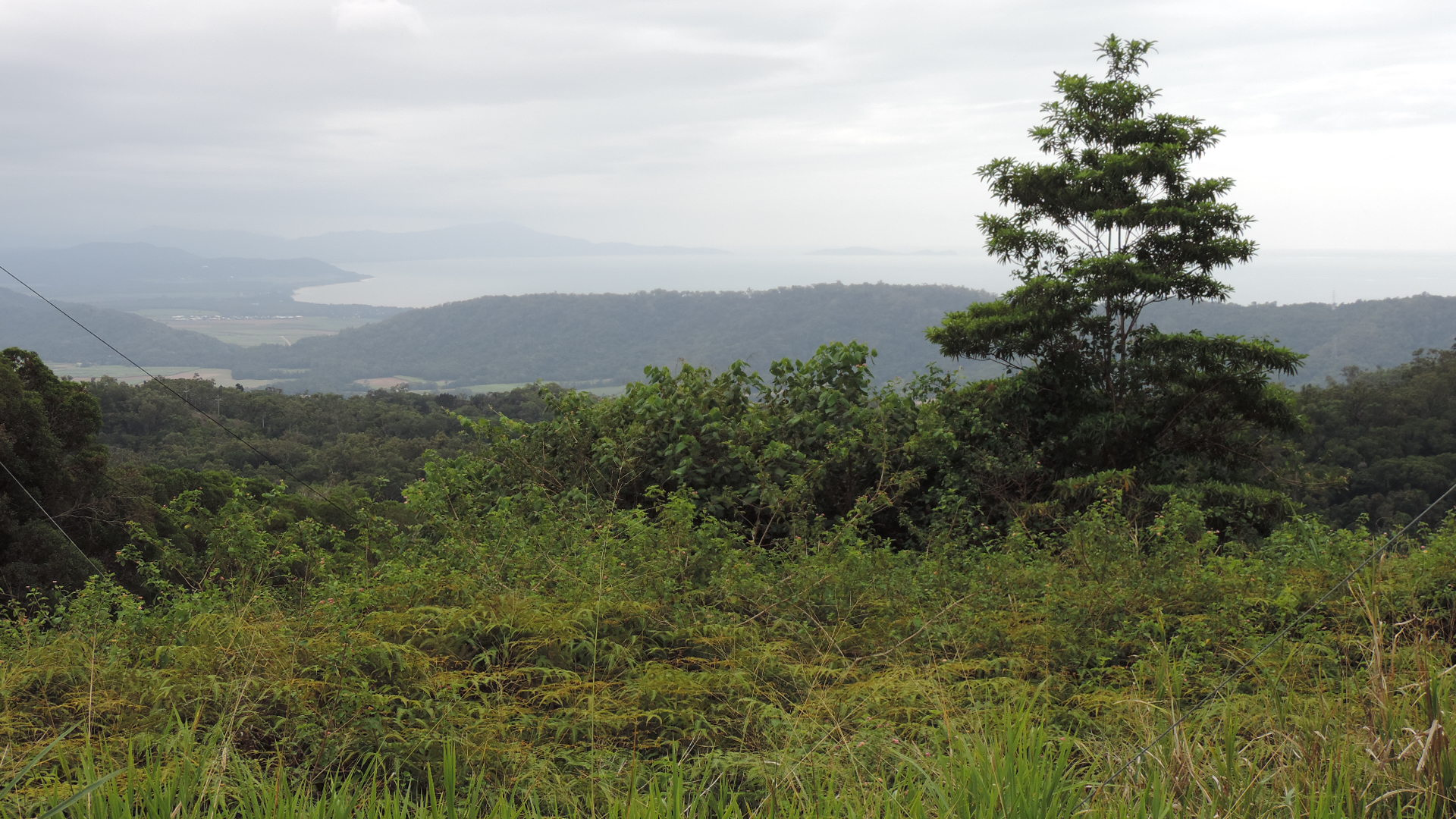
View from the Mossman Mount Molloy Road Lookout looking north towards the Coral Sea, 2016

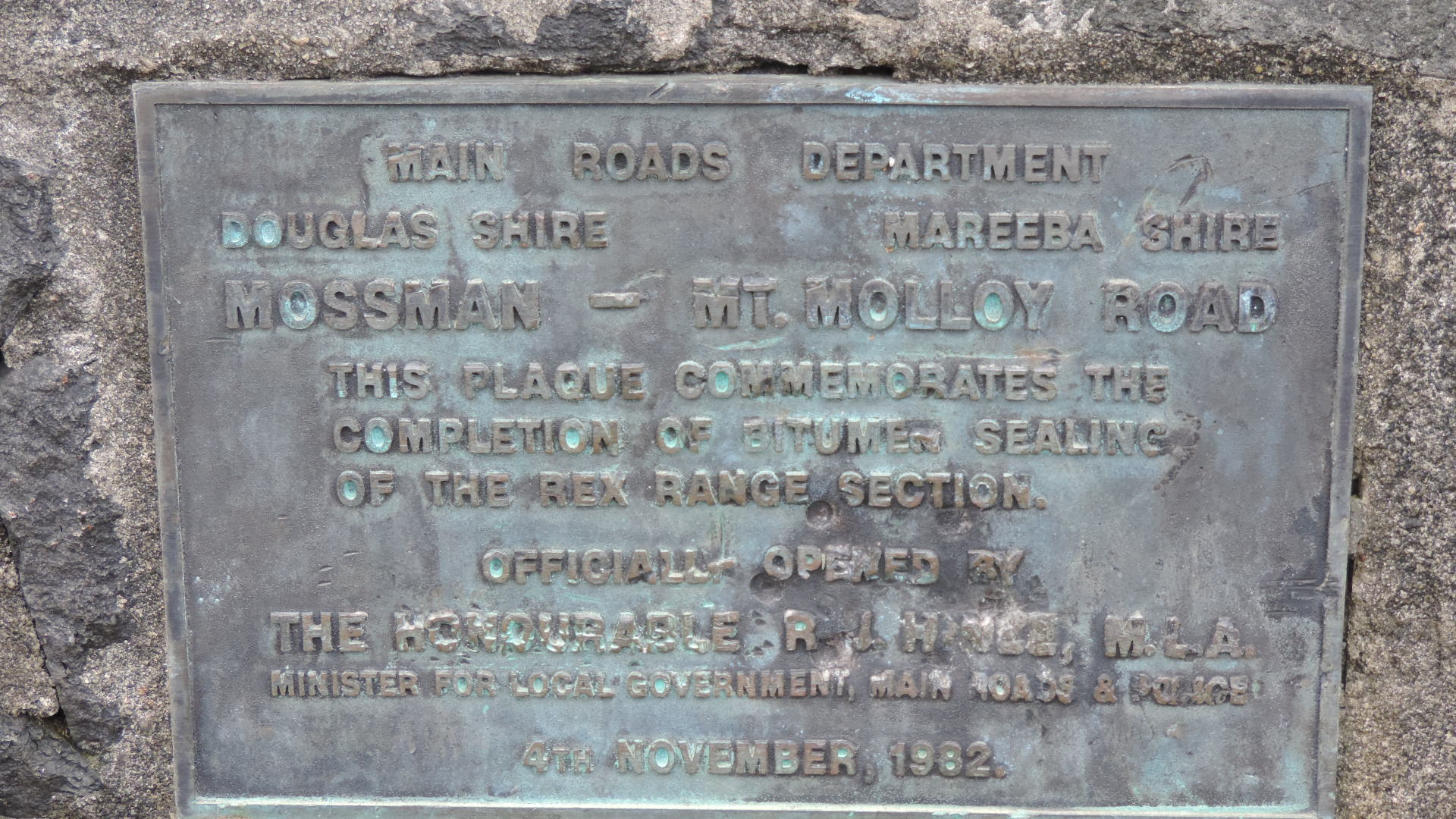
Monument commemorating the 1982 sealing of the Rex Range section of the Mossman Mount Molloy Road, 2016

On the ascent/descent of the range on the Mossman - Mount Molloy Road is the Lyons Lookout with a good view across the coastal areas to the north-east. There is a memorial commemorating the sealing of the road.

Julatten is a good area to see Wet Tropics bird species including endemic species.

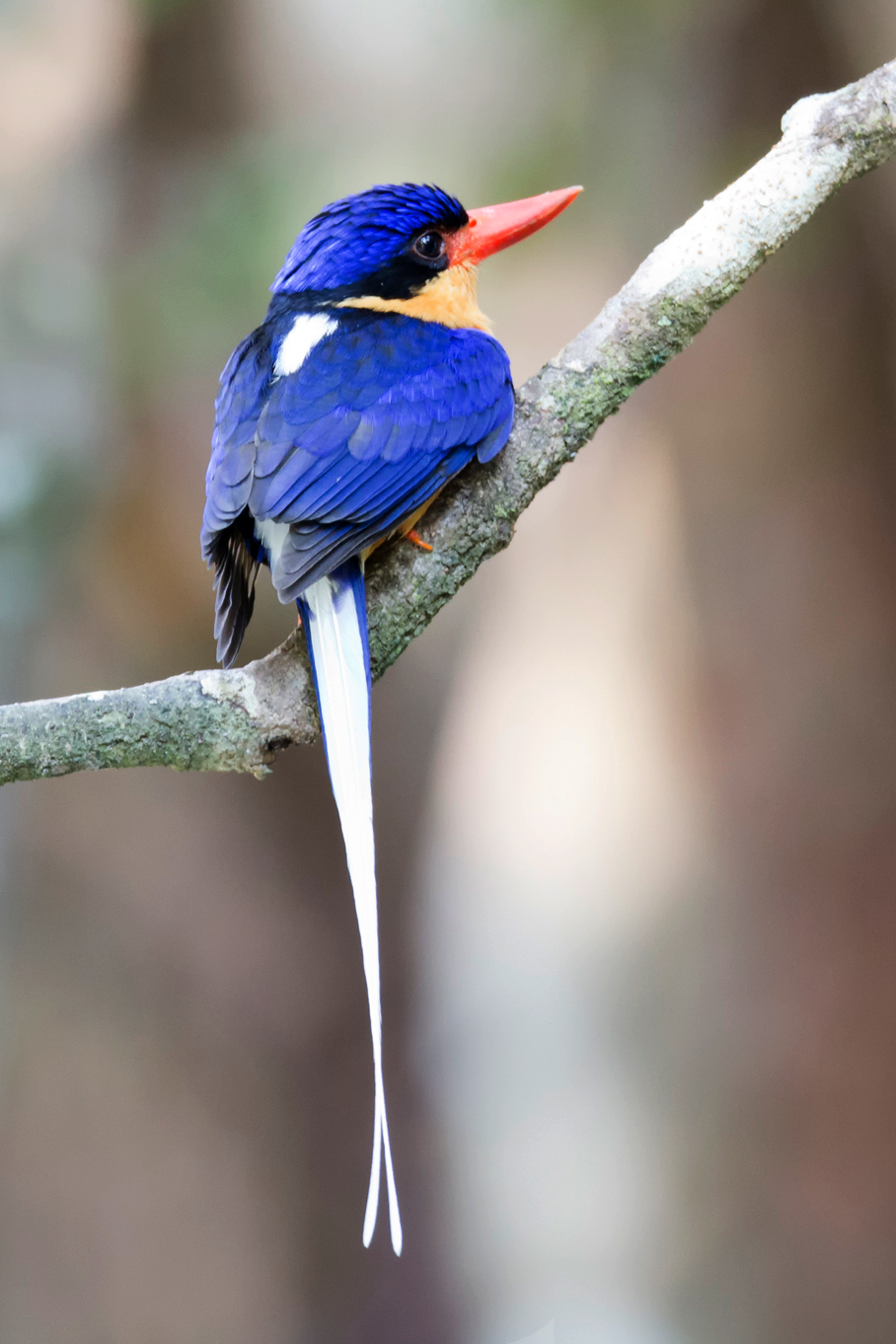
Buff breasted paradise kingfisher, 2014
