= Cassowary, Queensland =

Cassowary
- Suburb
- Interactive map of Cassowary
- Coordinates: 16.5225°S 145.425°E
- Country: Australia
- State: Queensland
- LGA: Shire of Douglas
- Location: 7.9 km (4.9 mi) SE of Mossman; 18.2 km (11.3 mi) W of Port Douglas; 74.1 km (46.0 mi) NNW of Cairns; 1,751 km (1,088 mi) NNW of Brisbane

Government
  - State electorate: Cook
  - Federal division: Leichhardt

Area
  - Total: 24.9 km^{2} (9.6 sq mi)

Population
  - Total: 119 (2021 census)
  - Density: 4.779/km^{2} (12.38/sq mi)
- Time zone: UTC+10:00 (AEST)
- Postcode: 4873
Suburbs around Cassowary
Shannonvale	Bonnie Doon	Killaloe
Julatten	Cassowary	Craiglie
Julatten	Mowbray	Mowbray

Cassowary is a rural locality in the Shire of Douglas, Queensland, Australia. In the 2021 census, Cassowary had a population of 119 people.

== Geography ==
The north-western part of the locality is low-lying coastal plains (10–20 metres about sea level) and is used for farming, predominantly sugarcane. The eastern and southern parts of the locality form part of the Cassowary Range, rising to unnamed peaks of about 350 metres, and are within the Mowbray National Park.

The Mossman - Mount Molloy Road which winds up and down the Great Dividing Range forms the north-western boundary of the locality. The Captain Cook Highway forms a short northern boundary. A cane tramway carries harvested sugarcane to the sugar mill at Mossman.

== History ==
The locality presumably takes its name from the large Australian flightless bird, the cassowary, which is found in the northern tropics of Queensland.

Cassowary State School opened on 3 February 1913. It closed in 1967. It was located on Captain Cook Highway (16.4881°S 145.3906°E), now just across the locality boundary in neighbouring Shannonvale.

== Demographics ==
In the 2016 census, Cassowary had a population of 119 people.

In the 2021 census, Cassowary had a population of 119 people.

== Education ==
There are no schools in Cassowary. The nearest government primary schools are Mossman State School in Mossman to the north-west and Port Douglas State School in Port Douglas to the east. The nearest government secondary school is Mossman State High School in Mossman to the north-west.
