= Oak Beach, Queensland =

Oak Beach
- Town
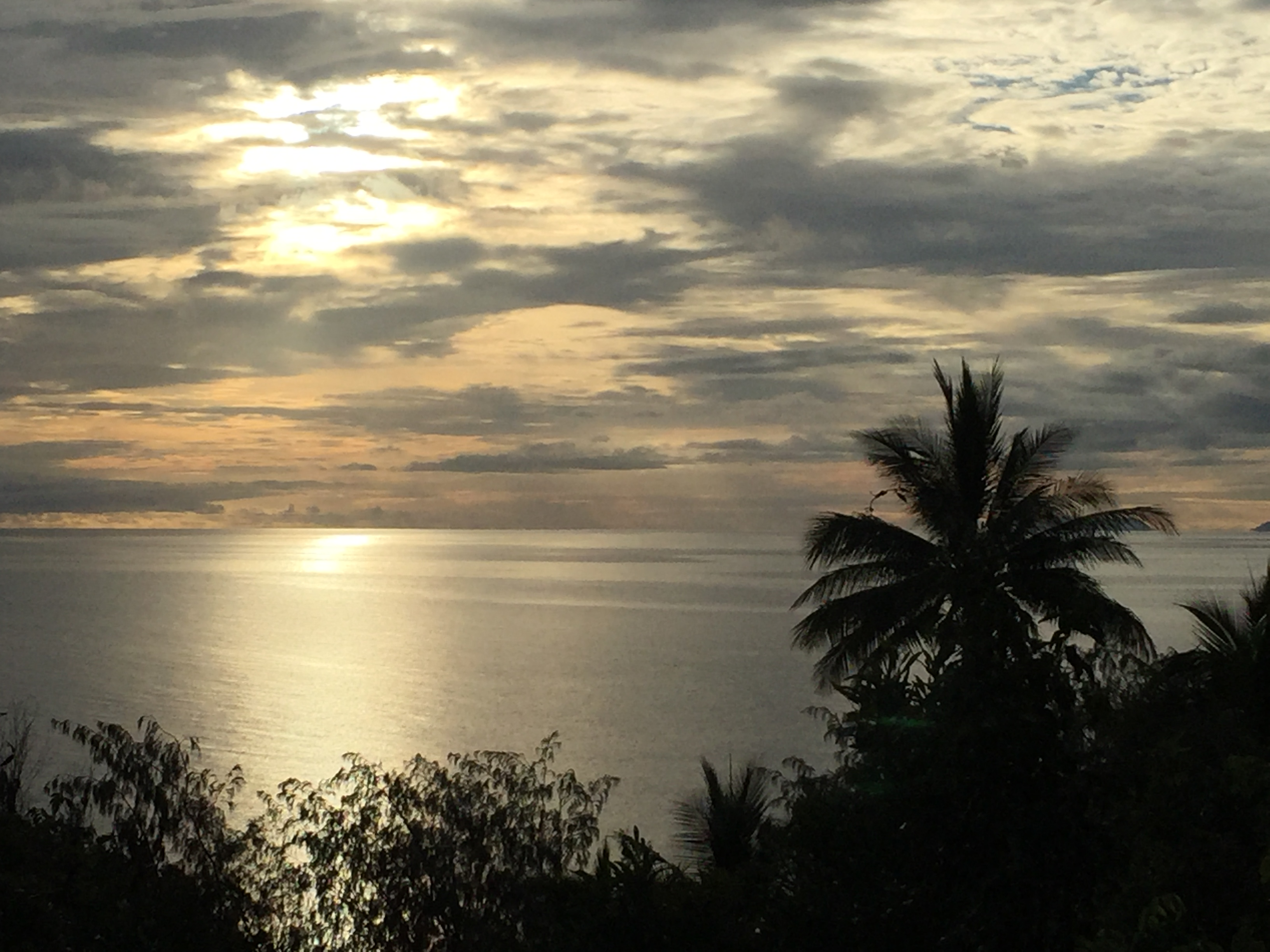
- Sunrise at Oak Beach (32020450496).jpg, 2017

- Interactive map of Oak Beach
- Coordinates: 16.6002°S 145.5216°E
- Country: Australia
- State: Queensland
- LGA: Shire of Douglas
- Location: 16.2 km (10.1 mi) SSE of Port Douglas; 25.8 km (16.0 mi) SE of Mossman; 50.3 km (31.3 mi) NW of Cairns; 1,727 km (1,073 mi) NNW of Brisbane

Government
  - State electorate: Cook
  - Federal division: Leichhardt

Area
  - Total: 6.9 km^{2} (2.7 sq mi)

Population
  - Total: 186 (2021 census)
  - Density: 26.96/km^{2} (69.8/sq mi)
- Time zone: UTC+10:00 (AEST)
- Postcode: 4877
Localities around Oak Beach
Mowbray	Mowbray	Coral Sea
Mowbray	Oak Beach	Coral Sea
Mowbray	Mowbray	Coral Sea

Oak Beach is a coastal town and locality in the Shire of Douglas, Queensland, Australia. In the 2021 census, the locality of Oak Beach had a population of 186 people.

== Geography ==
Oak Beach is bounded by the Coral Sea to east and completely surrounded by the locality of Mowbray on all its land boundaries.

The locality has the following beaches:

- Pebbly Beach in the northern part of the locality (16.5818°S 145.5126°E) extending north into neighbouring Mowbray
- the eponymous Oak Beach in the southern part of the locality (16.6009°S 145.5229°E) extending south into neighbouring Mowbray

The town of Oak Beach is located in the far south-east of the locality on the coast. The residential areas are along the coast in the town and along the coast on Pebbly Beach. The southern part of the locality is mostly rural residential. The west of the locality is used to grow sugarcane.

Offshore is Trinity Bay, part of the Coral Sea (16.583°S 145.529°E).

The Captain Cook Highway enters the locality from the south-east (Mowbray) and exits to the north (Mowbray). It does not pass through the town.

== Demographics ==
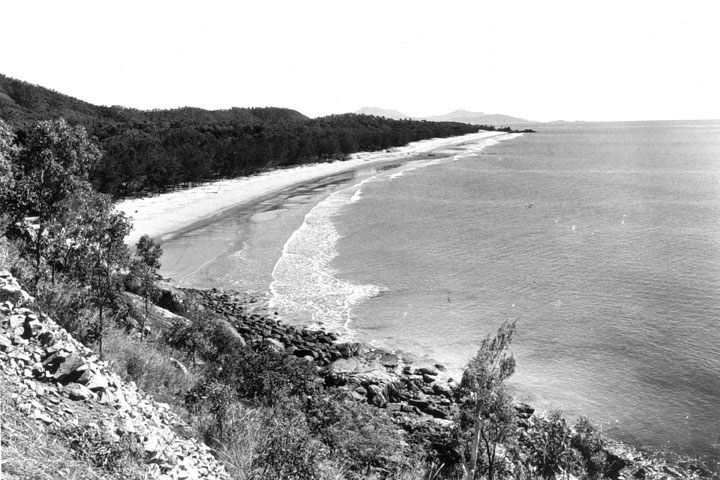
Oak Beach, circa 1935

In the 2016 census, the locality of Oak Beach had a population of 195 people.

In the 2021 census, the locality of Oak Beach had a population of 186 people.

== Education ==
There are no schools in Oak Beach. The nearest government primary school is Port Douglas State School in Port Douglas to the north-west. The nearest government secondary school is Mossman State High School in Mossman to the north-west.
