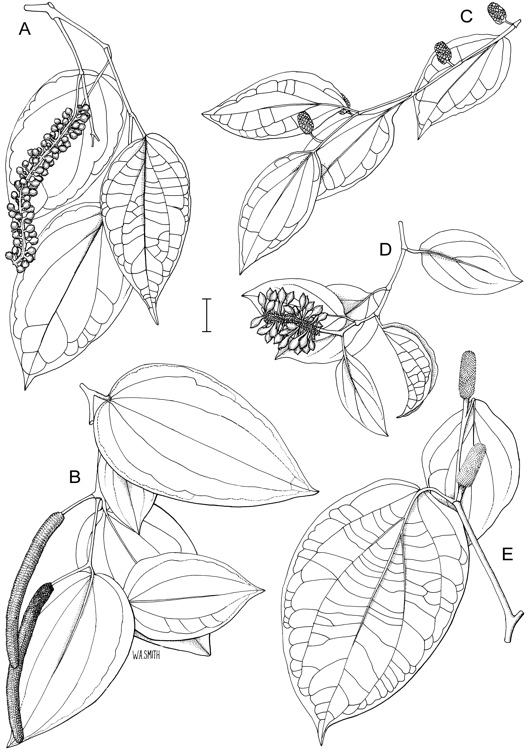

Conservation status
- Least Concern (NCA)

Scientific classification
- Kingdom: Plantae
- Clade: Tracheophytes
- Clade: Angiosperms
- Clade: Magnoliids
- Order: Piperales
- Family: Piperaceae
- Genus: Piper
- Species: P. fungiforme

Binomial name
- Piper fungiforme Spokes

= Piper fungiforme =

Species of flowering plant

Piper fungiforme is a plant in the family Piperaceae endemic to northeast Queensland, Australia.

== Description ==
Piper fungiforme is a root climber with a maximum stem diameter of 2 cm (0.79 in). The leaves are ovate to narrowly ovate, measuring up to 14 cm (5.5 in) long by 5 cm (2.0 in) wide. The apex is acuminate and the base cuneate and asymmetric. There are 2 or 3 pairs of lateral veins, all of which divert from the midvein in the basal portion of the leaf.

This species is dioecious, meaning that functionally female and functionally male flowers are borne on separate plants. The inflorescences are erect cylindrical spikes produced in the leaf axils − male spikes measure up to 4.5 cm (1.8 in) long by 0.5 cm (0.20 in) diameter and are carried on a peduncle around 0.5 cm (0.20 in) long, female spikes are shorter and wider on a peduncle up to 1 cm (0.39 in) long.

The fruit is an infructescence, that is, a mass consisting of the combined fruit of the individual flowers in the female inflorescence, like the pineapple and mulberry. It is cylindrical, tapering at the distal end, and measures up to 2.5 cm (0.98 in) long by 1.5 cm (0.59 in) wide. When mature it is bright red and fleshy.

=== Phenology ===
Flowering occurs from June to September, fruit ripen from December to March.

== Taxonomy ==
Piper fungiforme was first formally described by T.M. Spokes, and published in edition 2 of Flora of Australia in 2007. The type specimen is a collection made by Bernard Hyland from the Leo creek area of Cape York Peninsula.

=== Etymology ===
The species epithet fungiforme is Latin for "mushroom-headed", which is a reference to the "shape of the connective in stamens of the male spikes".

== Distribution and habitat ==
Piper fungiforme is found in northeastern Queensland in two disjunct populations, the first from Kutini-Payamu (Iron Range) National Park to the McIlwraith Range, and the other from Ngalba Bulal National Park (about 30 km (19 mi) south of Cooktown) to the Mount Lewis National Park.

It grows in rainforest at altitudes from 100 m (330 ft) to 1,100 m (3,600 ft), scrambling over rocks, logs and tree roots, and also climbing tree trunks. It will occasionally reach the canopy.

== Conservation ==
This species is listed by the Queensland Department of Environment and Science as least concern. As of 8 March 2023, it has not been assessed by the International Union for the Conservation of Nature (IUCN).
