= Killaloe, Queensland =

Killaloe
- Suburb
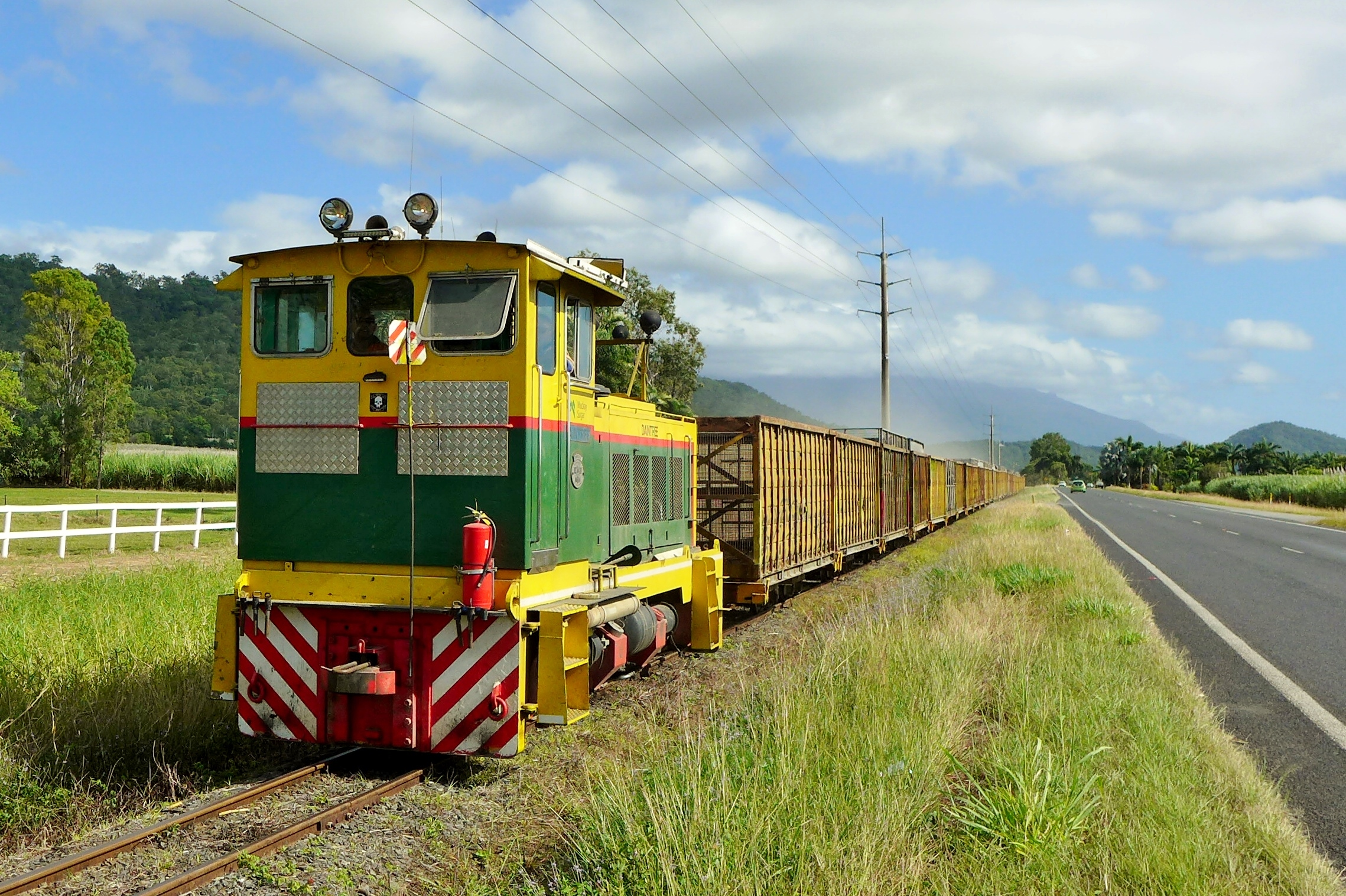
- Cane tram travelling through Killaloe beside the Captain Cook Highway, 2015

- Interactive map of Killaloe
- Coordinates: 16.4933°S 145.4266°E
- Country: Australia
- State: Queensland
- LGA: Shire of Douglas
- Location: 9.2 km (5.7 mi) SE of Mossman; 11.5 km (7.1 mi) W of Port Douglas; 66.9 km (41.6 mi) NNW of Cairns; 1,770 km (1,100 mi) NNW of Brisbane

Government
  - State electorate: Cook
  - Federal division: Leichhardt

Area
  - Total: 23.5 km^{2} (9.1 sq mi)

Population
  - Total: 124 (2021 census)
  - Density: 5.28/km^{2} (13.67/sq mi)
- Time zone: UTC+10:00 (AEST)
- Postcode: 4877
Suburbs around Killaloe
Bonnie Doon	Coral Sea	Coral Sea
Cassowary	Killaloe	Port Douglas
Cassowary	Craiglie	Port Douglas

Killaloe is a coastal rural locality in the Shire of Douglas, Queensland, Australia. In the 2021 census, Killaloe had a population of 124 people.

== Geography ==
The south-eastern boundary of the locality are Packers Creek and the Dickson Inlet which lead to the Coral Sea, which forms the northern boundary of the locality. The Cassowary Range forms the south-western boundary of the locality. Numerous small creeks flow down from the range through the locality to the sea.

The Captain Cook Highway and the cane tramway to the Mossman sugar mill pass through the locality from south-east to north-west immediately parallel to one another. Most of the developed land occurs on either side of these transport routes and the predominant land use is the growing of sugarcane. The land closer to the coast is not developed.

== History ==
Killaloe State School opened on 23 July 1928 and closed on 15 July 1935. Despite its name, the school was on the northern corner of the Captain Cook Highway and Mcclellan Road in present-day Craiglie (approx 16.51096°S 145.44257°E).

The locality was officially named and bounded on 8 September 2000.

== Demographics ==
In the 2016 census, Killaloe had a population of 116 people.

In the 2021 census, Killaloe had a population of 124 people.

== Education ==
There are no schools in Killaloe. The nearest government primary schools are Mossman State School in Mossman to the north-west and Port Douglas State School in neighbouring Port Douglas to the south-east. The nearest government secondary school is Mossman State High School in Mossman to the north-west.

== Facilities ==
There is a waste transfer station on Killaloe Dump Road.
