= Douglas Municipal Airport =

Douglas Municipal Airport may refer to:

all in the United States

- Douglas Municipal Airport (Arizona) in Douglas, Arizona (FAA/IATA: DGL)
- Douglas Municipal Airport (Georgia) in Douglas, Georgia (FAA: DQH)
- Douglas Municipal Airport (North Carolina), in Charlotte, North Carolina; now Charlotte Douglas International Airport (FAA/IATA:CLT)
- Douglas Municipal Airport (Wyoming) in Douglas, Wyoming (closed)

== See also ==
- Douglas International Airport (disambiguation)
