= Cooya Beach, Queensland =

Cooya Beach Kuyu Kuyu (Kuku-Yalanji)
- Town
- Interactive map of Cooya Beach
- Coordinates: 16.4483°S 145.4072°E
- Country: Australia
- State: Queensland
- LGA: Shire of Douglas
- Location: 4.5 km (2.8 mi) ENE of Mossman; 74 km (46 mi) NW of Cairns; 419 km (260 mi) NNW of Townsville; 1,750 km (1,090 mi) NNW of Brisbane

Government
  - State electorate: Cook
  - Federal division: Leichhardt

Area
  - Total: 8.8 km^{2} (3.4 sq mi)

Population
  - Total: 523 (2021 census)
  - Density: 59.4/km^{2} (153.9/sq mi)
- Time zone: UTC+10:00 (AEST)
- Postcode: 4873
Localities around Cooya Beach
| Newell | Newell | Coral Sea |
| Bonnie Doon | Cooya Beach | Coral Sea |
| Bonnie Doon | Bonnie Doon | Coral Sea |

Cooya Beach (Kuku-Yalanji: Kuyu Kuyu) is a coastal town and locality in the Shire of Douglas, Queensland, Australia. In the 2021 census, the locality of Cooya Beach had a population of 523 people.

== Geography ==
The locality is low-lying, with housing along most of the coastal strip. Apart from that, the land is mostly undeveloped. The locality includes part of an unnamed island at the mouth of the Mossman River.

== History ==
The town was named on 1 November 1963. Despite receiving a formal layout in 1963, major residential development and construction in the area largely waited another 30 years, transitioning into a quiet suburb for working families and locals.

== Demographics ==
In the 2016 census, the locality of Cooya Beach had a population of 546 people.

In the 2021 census, the locality of Cooya Beach had a population of 523 people.

== Education ==
There are no schools in Cooya Beach. The nearest government primary and secondary schools are Mossman State School and Mossman State High School respectively, both in Mossman to the south-west.

== Amenities ==
There is a boat ramp on Bouganvillea Street into the Mossman River (16.4414°S 145.4059°E). It is managed by the Douglas Shire Council.
