= Douglas-Daly =

Douglas-Daly may refer to:

- Douglas-Daly, Northern Territory, Australia, a locality
  - Douglas-Daly Experiment Station, a research station in the Northern Territory
  - Douglas Daly School, a school in the Northern Territory

== See also ==
- Daly (disambiguation)
- Douglas (disambiguation)
