= Baron Douglas =

Baron Douglas may refer to:

- Baron Douglas, of Ambresbury, Co. Wilts (created 1786 in the Peerage of Great Britain), a subsidiary title held by William Douglas, 4th Duke of Queensberry
- Baron Douglas of Douglas, Co. Lanark (created 1790 in the Peerage of Great Britain)
- Baron Douglas of Lochleven (created 1791 in the Peerage of Great Britain), a subsidiary title held by George Douglas, 16th Earl of Morton
- Baron Douglas of Douglas (created 1875 in the Peerage of the United Kingdom), a subsidiary title held by the Earl of Home
- Baron Douglas of Baads (created 1911 in the Peerage of Great Britain), a subsidiary title held by Viscount Chilston
- Baron Douglas of Kirtleside (created 1948)
- Baron Douglas of Barloch (created 1950 in the Peerage of the United Kingdom)

== See also ==
- Lord Douglas (disambiguation)
