= Douglas, Illinois =

Douglas, Illinois may refer to:

- Douglas, Knox County, Illinois, an unincorporated community in Knox County
- Douglas, St. Clair County, Illinois, an unincorporated community in St. Clair County
- Douglas, Chicago, a neighborhood of Chicago
- New Douglas, Illinois, a village in Madison County

== See also ==
- Douglas County, Illinois, a county in the U.S. state of Illinois
