= Bonnie Doon, Queensland =

Bonnie Doon
- Suburb
- Interactive map of Bonnie Doon
- Coordinates: 16.4633°S 145.3988°E
- Country: Australia
- State: Queensland
- LGA: Shire of Douglas
- Location: 3.6 km (2.2 mi) NE of Mossman; 73.1 km (45.4 mi) NW of Cairns; 418 km (260 mi) NNW of Townsville; 1,860 km (1,160 mi) NNW of Brisbane

Government
  - State electorate: Cook
  - Federal division: Leichhardt

Area
  - Total: 17.3 km^{2} (6.7 sq mi)

Population
  - Total: 563 (2021 census)
  - Density: 32.54/km^{2} (84.3/sq mi)
- Time zone: UTC+10:00 (AEST)
- Postcode: 4873
Suburbs around Bonnie Doon
Mossman	Newell	Cooya Beach
Mossman	Bonnie Doon	Coral Sea
Shannonvale	Cassowary	Killaloe

Bonnie Doon is a coastal rural locality in the Shire of Douglas, Queensland, Australia. In the 2021 census, Bonnie Doon had a population of 563 people.

== Geography ==
Bonnie Doon is bounded to the north by the Mossman River, to the east by the Coral Sea, and to the south by the Captain Cook Highway. The South Mossman River and its tributary Cassowary Creek flow from the south and, after, their confluence, the South Mossman River becomes the north-western boundary of the locality, until its confluence with the Mossman River.

== History ==
In October 1878, William Henry Buchanan selected 400 acres of land on the south bank of the Mossman River, calling it Bonnie Doon.

On 22 October 1886, the murder of William Thompson by his wife Ellen Thompson and her lover John Harrison, a worker at Bonnie Doon resulted in both of them being hanged at Boggo Road Gaol in Brisbane on 13 June 1887. Ellen Thompson was the only woman ever hanged in Queensland.

== Demographics ==
In the 2016 census, Bonnie Doon had a population of 372 people.

In the 2021 census, Bonnie Doon had a population of 563 people.

== Education ==
There are no schools in Bonnie Doon. The nearest government primary and secondary schools are Mossman State School and Mossman State High School, both in neighbouring Mossman to the west.
