= Shannonvale, Queensland =

Shannonvale
- Suburb
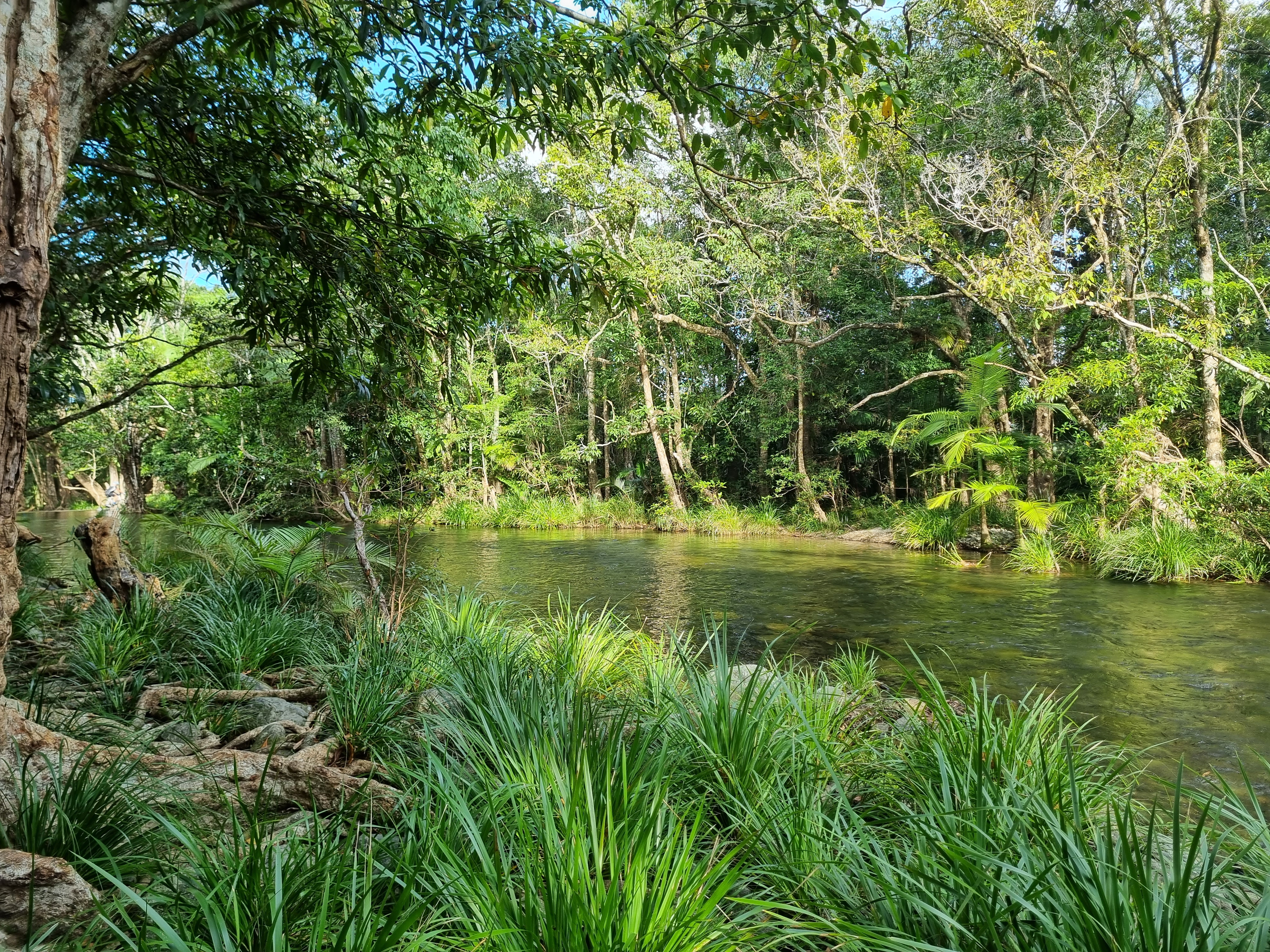
- Swimming hole in the South Mossman River, 2023

- Interactive map of Shannonvale
- Coordinates: 16.5130°S 145.3244°E
- Country: Australia
- State: Queensland
- City: Mossman
- LGA: Shire of Douglas
- Location: 7.6 km (4.7 mi) S of Mossman; 19.0 km (11.8 mi) W of Port Douglas; 74.4 km (46.2 mi) NW of Cairns; 1,771 km (1,100 mi) NNW of Brisbane

Government
  - State electorate: Cook
  - Federal division: Leichhardt

Area
  - Total: 84.7 km^{2} (32.7 sq mi)

Population
  - Total: 194 (2021 census)
  - Density: 2.290/km^{2} (5.932/sq mi)
- Time zone: UTC+10:00 (AEST)
- Postcode: 4873
Suburbs around Shannonvale
Syndicate	Mossman Gorge	Mossman; Bonnie Doon
Mount Carbine	Shannonvale	Cassowary
Mount Carbine	Julatten	Julatten

Shannonvale is a rural locality in the Shire of Douglas, Queensland, Australia. Most of the locality forms part of the UNESCO World Heritage-listed Wet Tropics of Queensland, In the 2021 census, Shannonvale had a population of 194 people.

== Geography ==
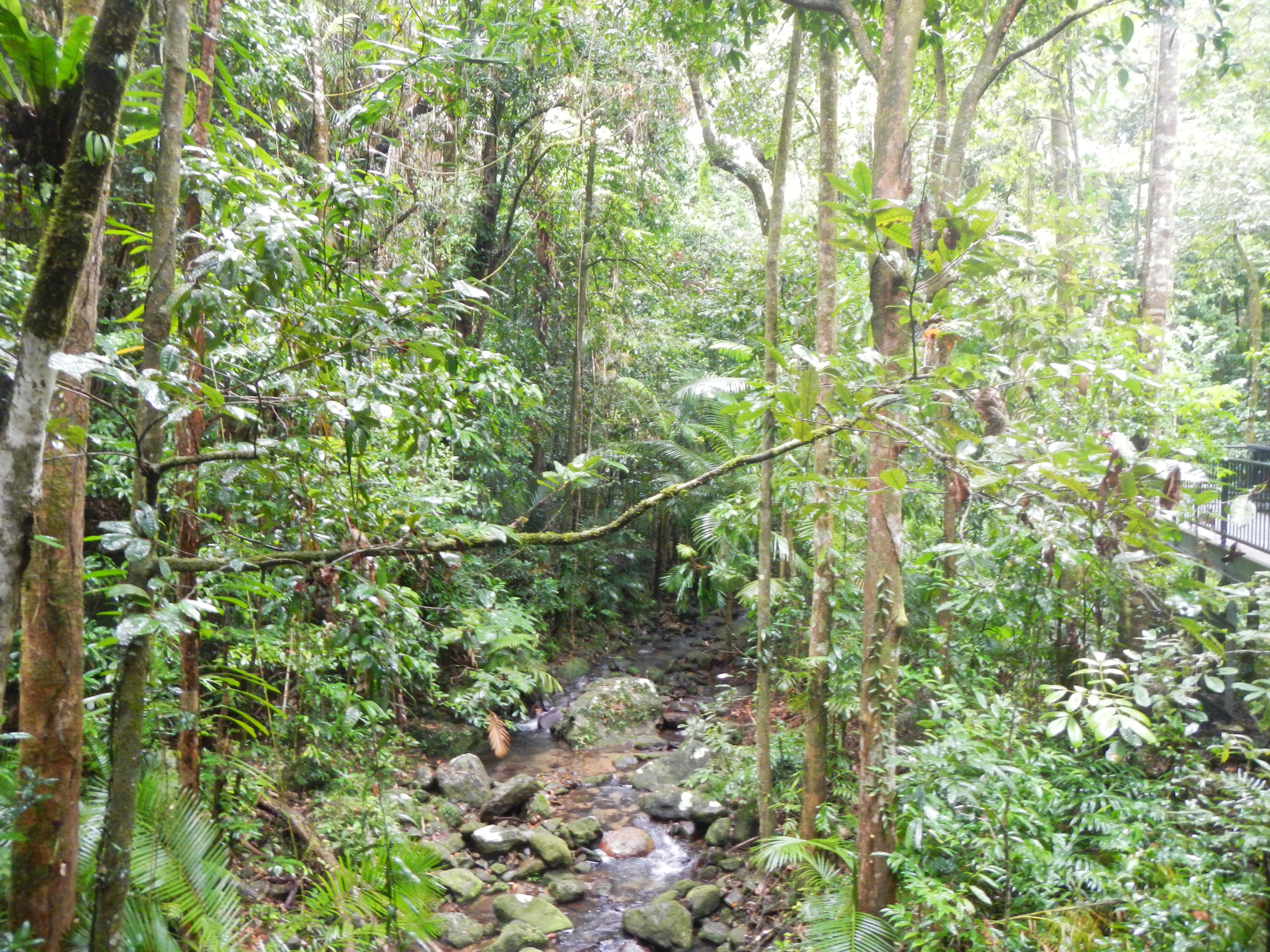
Shannonvale rain forest, 2013

The ridge of the Great Dividing Range forms the southern and western boundaries of the locality, which has the following named peaks:

- Mount Demi (Manjal Dimbi) (16.4979°S 145.3233°E) 1,025 metres (3,363 ft) above sea level
- Perseverance Mountain (The Lookout) (16.5509°S 145.3259°E) 917 metres (3,009 ft)
- Round Mountain (16.5222°S 145.3101°E) 1,009 metres (3,310 ft)
- The Bluff (16.4985°S 145.3243°E) 1,285 metres (4,216 ft)

The South Mossman River rises on the slopes of the Great Dividing Range in the north-east of the locality and flows through the locality exiting to the north-east (Bonnie Doon); it is a tributary of the Mossman River which flows into the Coral Sea.

The Captain Cook Highway forms part of the northern boundary of the locality while the Mossman-Mount Molloy Road forms part of the north-eastern boundary.

Most of the locality is within a protected area with the Daintree National Park in the north of the locality and the Mount Lewis National Park in the centre and south of the locality. Both of these national parks form part of the UNESCO World Heritage-listed Wet Tropics of Queensland.

In the remaining area in the north-east of the locality, the land use is predominantly growing sugarcane with rural residential housing and grazing on native vegetation.

There is a cane tramway network to transport the harvested sugarcane to the local sugar mill.

== Demographics ==
In the 2016 census, Shannonvale had a population of 202 people.

In the 2021 census, Shannonvale had a population of 194 people.

== Education ==
There are no schools in Shannonvale. The nearest government primary and secondary schools are Mossman State School and Mossman State High School, both in neighbouring Mossman to the north-east.
