= Douglas County =

Douglas County is any of twelve counties in the United States, all of which are named for Stephen A. Douglas, a Senator from Illinois from 1847 to 1861 and the Democratic Party nominee for president in 1860:

- Douglas County, Colorado
- Douglas County, Georgia
- Douglas County, Illinois
- Douglas County, Kansas
- Douglas County, Minnesota
- Douglas County, Missouri
- Douglas County, Nebraska, the most populous such county in the United States.
- Douglas County, Nevada
- Douglas County, Oregon
- Douglas County, South Dakota, the least populous such county in the United States.
- Douglas County, Washington
- Douglas County, Wisconsin
