= Mount Lewis National Park =

National park in Australia

- IUCN category II (national park)
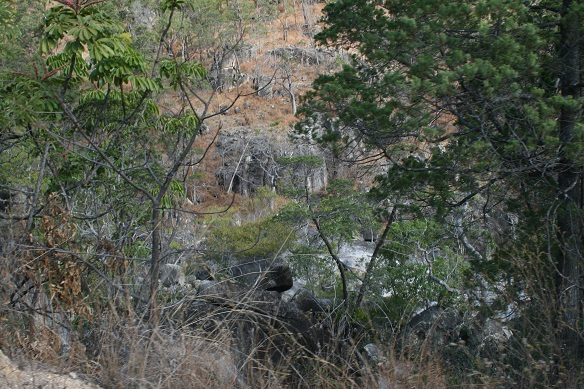

- Location within Queensland
- Location: Queensland
- Nearest city: Julatten
- Coordinates: 16°30′35″S 145°13′22″E
- Area: 278.6 km^{2} (107.6 sq mi)
- Established: 2009
- Governing body: Queensland Parks and Wildlife Service
- Website: Official website

Mount Lewis National Park is a part of the traditional territory of the Kuku Yalanji Aboriginal people of Far North Queensland, Australia. It is a national park in both the Shire of Mareeba and Douglas Shire, adjacent to both Daintree National Park and Mount Spurgeon National Park. It is part of the Wet Tropics of Queensland and Einasleigh Uplands bioregions. The park lies within the catchment areas of the Mitchell River, Mossman River and Daintree Rivers. Mount Lewis National Park preserves part of the Mount Carbine Tableland.

In 2009, Mount Lewis Forest Reserve and Riflemead Forest Reserve were combined to form Mount Lewis National Park. The landscape is mountainous and covered by forest. About half of 1% of the national park is classed as wetlands.

== Environment ==
The area is a biodiversity hotspot. In total, 43 rare or threatened species have been identified in the park.

The Mount Lewis spiny crayfish is an endemic species. Also found in the park are golden bowerbirds, blue-faced parrotfinch, giant blue earthworms, cinereus ringtail possum, masked white-tailed rat, red-bellied black snake as well as several species or rare frogs. In February 2017 small population of endangered northern bettongs had been discovered in the National Park.

== Recreation ==
Four-wheel driving and trail-bike riding are the most popular recreational activities. Several clearings along Mount Lewis Road have been identified as good locations for spotting a large variety of birds.

== Access ==
Access is provided by Mount Lewis Road. This road leaves the Mossman Mount Molloy Road just north of Julatten. A number of private tour companies operate in the park.

== Facilities ==
Camping is not permitted. There are no dedicated day-use areas established.

== See also ==
- Protected areas of Queensland
