= Douglas Island (disambiguation) =

Douglas Island is a tidal island in the U.S. state of Alaska.

Douglas Island may also refer to:

- Douglas Island (British Columbia), Canada
- Douglas Island (New Brunswick), Canada
- Douglas Island (Western Australia), see List of islands of Western Australia, D-G
- Douglas Island (Nunavut), Canada, between Dolphin and Union Strait and Coronation Gulf and Cape Krusenstern (southwest) and Lady Franklin Point (northeast)
- Douglas Islands, in Antarctica
- Protection Island (Nanaimo), formally named Douglas Island
