= Douglas, St. Clair County, Illinois =

Douglas, Illinois
- Unincorporated community
- Location within Illinois
- Coordinates: 38°25′28″N 89°58′57″W
- Country: United States
- State: Illinois
- County: St. Clair
- Elevation: 472 ft (144 m)
- Time zone: UTC-6 (Central (CST))
  - Summer (DST): UTC-5 (CDT)
- Area code: 618
- GNIS feature ID: 426313

Douglas is an unincorporated community in St. Clair County, Illinois, United States. Douglas is located along Illinois Route 159, 1 mile (1.6 km) northeast of downtown Smithton.
