= Camp Douglas =

Camp Douglas can refer to a location in the United States:

- Camp Douglas, Wisconsin, a village
- Camp Douglas (Chicago), a Union POW camp during the American Civil War
- Camp Douglas (Wyoming), a US POW camp during World War II
- Camp Douglas (Fort Douglas), a U.S. Army post along the emigrant trails in Utah

Camp Douglas can refer to a farmstead in Spitsbergen:

- Camp Douglas, Spitsbergen, a former mining encampment

Campdouglas can refer to a location in Balmaghie, Scotland
