= Justice Douglas =

Justice Douglas may refer to:

- William O. Douglas (1898–1980), associate justice of the United States Supreme Court from 1939 to 1975
- Andy Douglas (judge) (1932–2021), associate justice of the Ohio Supreme Court from 1985 to 2002
- Archibald Douglas, 5th Earl of Angus (c. 1449–1513), Lord Chancellor of Scotland from 1493 to 1497
- Chuck Douglas (born 1942), associate justice of the New Hampshire Supreme Court
- James Marsh Douglas (1896–1974), associate justice of the Supreme Court of Missouri
- Michael L. Douglas (born 1948), associate justice of the Supreme Court of Nevada
- Robert M. Douglas (judge) (1849–1917), associate justice of the North Carolina Supreme Court
- Samuel J. Douglas (1812–1873), associate justice of the Florida Supreme Court from 1866 to 1868
- Stephen A. Douglas (1813–1861), associate justice of the Illinois Supreme Court
- Thomas Douglas (American judge) (1790–1855), chief justice of the Florida Supreme Court
- Wallace B. Douglas (1852–1930), associate justice of the Minnesota Supreme Court
- William W. Douglas (1841–1929), associate justice of the Rhode Island Supreme Court

== See also ==
- Samuel T. Douglass (1814–1898), associate justice of the Michigan Supreme Court
