= Douglas International Airport =

Douglas International Airport may refer to:

- Bisbee Douglas International Airport near Bisbee, Arizona, U.S.
- Charlotte Douglas International Airport in Charlotte, North Carolina, U.S.
- Isle of Man Airport near Douglas, Isle of Man

== See also ==
- Douglas Municipal Airport (disambiguation)
