= Lord Douglas =

Lord Douglas may refer to:

- Marquess of Douglas, created 1633 in the Peerage of Scotland, now a subsidiary title of the Duke of Hamilton
- Earl of Douglas, created 1356/7 in the Peerage of Scotland, forfeit in 1455
- Lord Douglas, created 1475/6 in the Peerage of Scotland, a subsidiary title held by Archibald Douglas, 5th Earl of Angus
- Lord Douglas of Hawick and Tibberis, created 1628 in Peerage of Scotland, subsidiary title of the Marquess of Queensberry
- Lord Douglas of Ettrick, created 1675 in the Peerage of Scotland as a subsidiary title of the Earl of Dumbarton
- Lord Douglas of Kinmont, Midlebie and Dornock, created 1684 in Peerage of Scotland, subsidiary title of the Duke of Buccleuch
- Lord Douglas of Neidpath, Lyne and Munard, created 1697 in Peerage of Scotland as subsidiary title for the Earl of March
- Lord Douglas, of Bonkill, Prestoun & Robertoun, created 1703 Peerage of Scotland as subsidiary title of the Duke of Douglas
- Lord Douglas of Lockerbie, Dalveen and Thornhill, created 1706 in the Peerage of Scotland as a subsidiary for the Earl of Solway, subsequently 2nd Duke of Dover
- Baron Douglas of Amesbury, Co. Wilts, created 1786 in the Peerage of Great Britain, a subsidiary title held by William Douglas, 4th Duke of Queensberry
- Baron Douglas of Douglas, Co. Lanark, created 1790 in the Peerage of Great Britain for Archibald Douglas, 1st Baron Douglas
- Baron Douglas of Lochleven, created 1791 for George Douglas, 16th Earl of Morton
- Baron Douglas, of Douglas, created 1875 in the Peerage of the United Kingdom for the 11th Earl of Home
- Baron Douglas of Baads, created 1911 in the Peerage of the United Kingdom as a subsidiary title for the Viscount Chilston
- Baron Douglas of Kirtleside, created 1948
- Baron Douglas of Barloch, created 1950 in the Peerage of the United Kingdom

== See also ==
- Baron Douglas (disambiguation)
