= Mowbray National Park =

National park in Queensland, Australia

- IUCN category II (national park)
- Location within Queensland
- Location: Queensland
- Coordinates: 16°34′50″S 145°25′32″E
- Area: 1.47 km^{2} (0.57 sq mi)
- Established: 1989
- Governing body: Queensland Parks and Wildlife Service
- Website: Official website

Mowbray is a national park in Queensland, Australia, 1441 km northwest of Brisbane. The park forms part of the Wooroonooran Important Bird Area, identified as such by BirdLife International because it supports populations of a range of bird species endemic to Queensland's Wet Tropics.

== See also ==
- Protected areas of Queensland
