= Captain Cook Highway =

Highway in Queensland, Australia

Captain Cook Highway Queensland
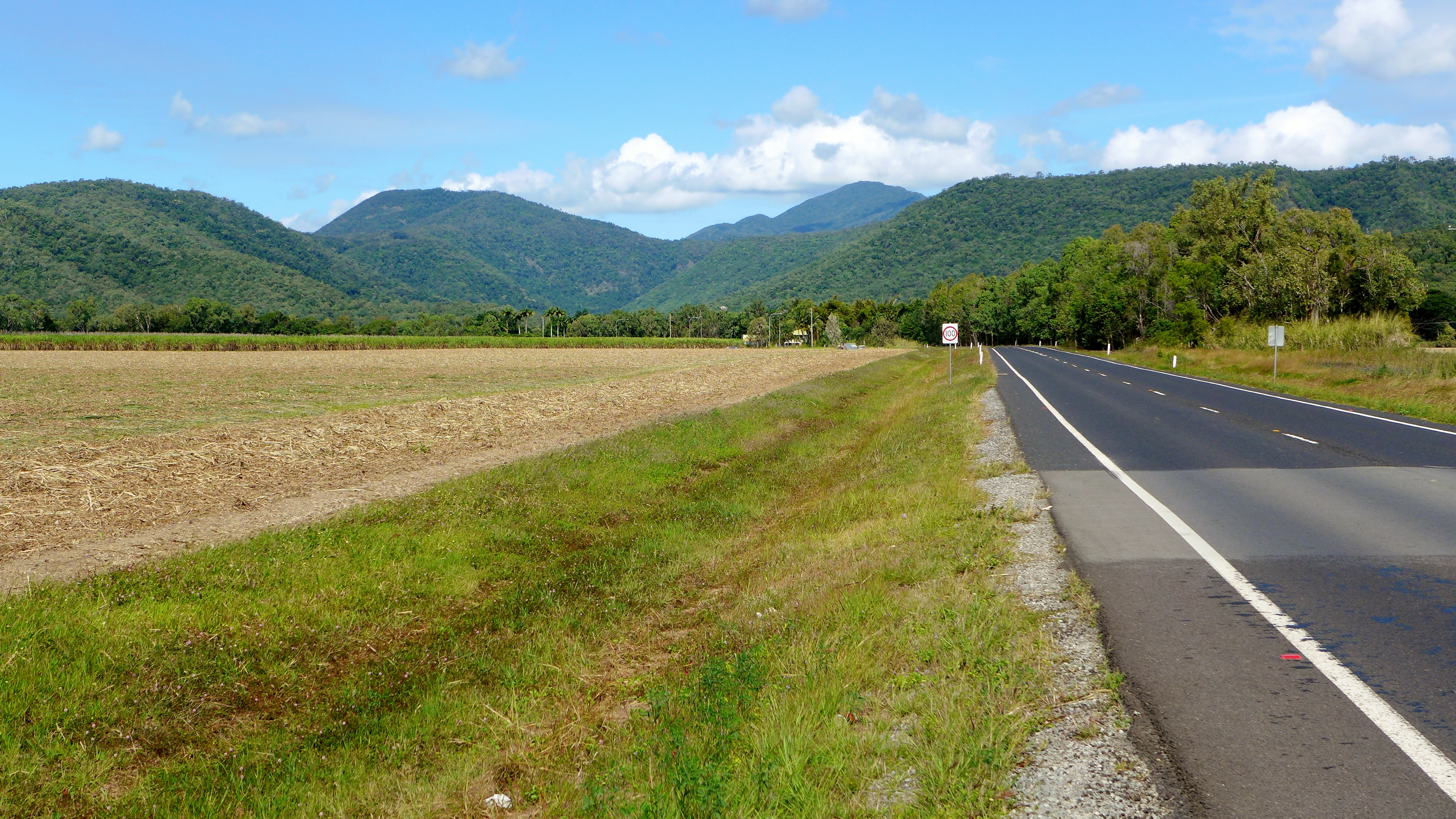
- The highway at Craiglie near Port Douglas
- Captain Cook Highway (green on black)

General information
- Type: Highway
- Length: 75 km (47 mi)
- Route number(s): (Cairns – Kennedy Highway Junction/Smithfield Shopping Centre roundabout; State Route 44 (Smithfield – Mossman)

Major junctions
- South end: Bruce Highway (Queensland Highway A1), Cairns
- Cairns Western Arterial Road (State Route 91) / Smithfield Bypass (Kudakai Crossland Connection); Kennedy Highway (National Route 1); Mossman-Mt Molloy Rd (State Route 44)
- North end: Mossman-Daintree Road, Mossman

Location(s)
- Major settlements: Smithfield, Palm Cove, Port Douglas

Highway system
- Highways in Australia; National Highway • Freeways in Australia; Highways in Queensland

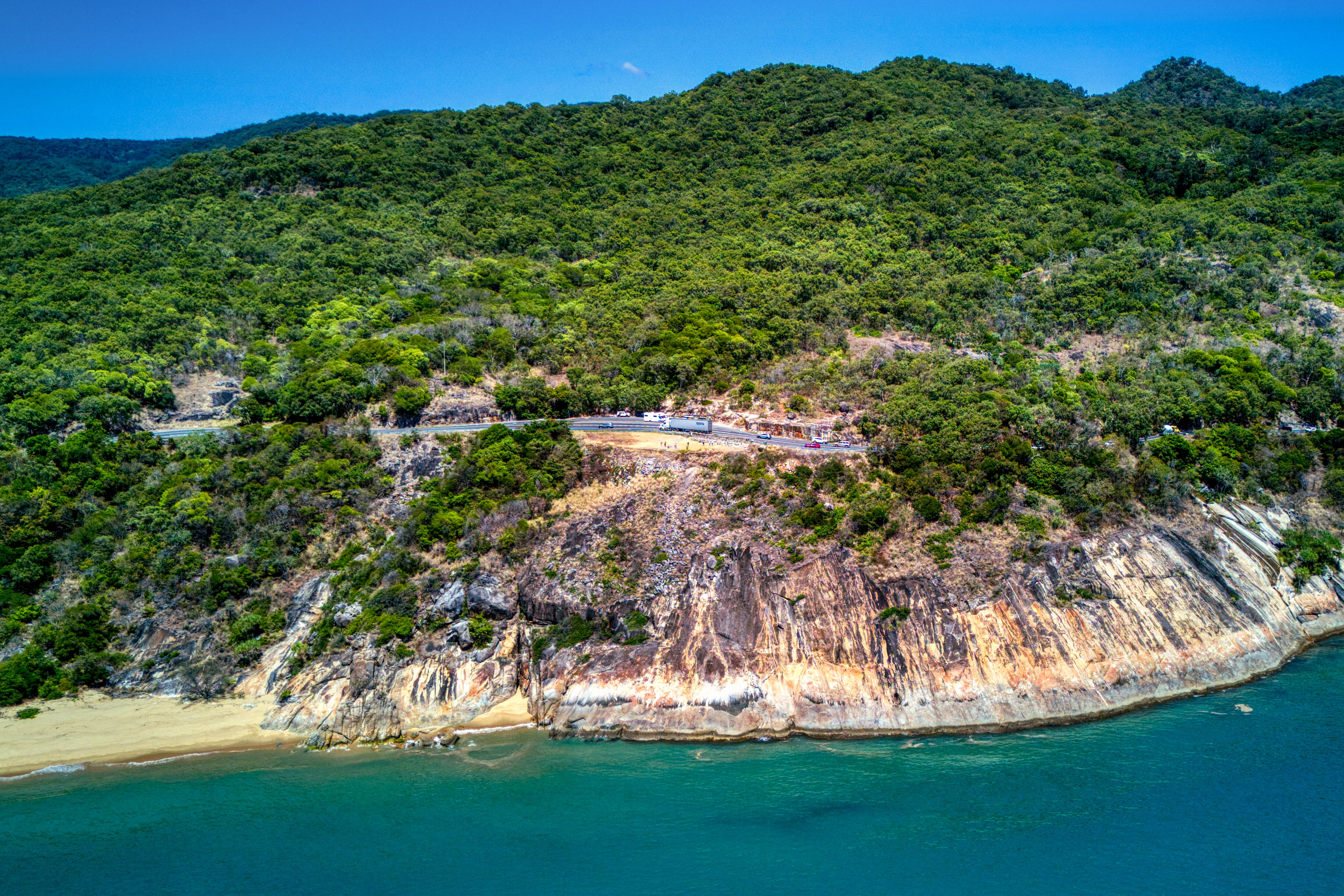
Rex Lookout on Captain Cook Highway, near Wangetti

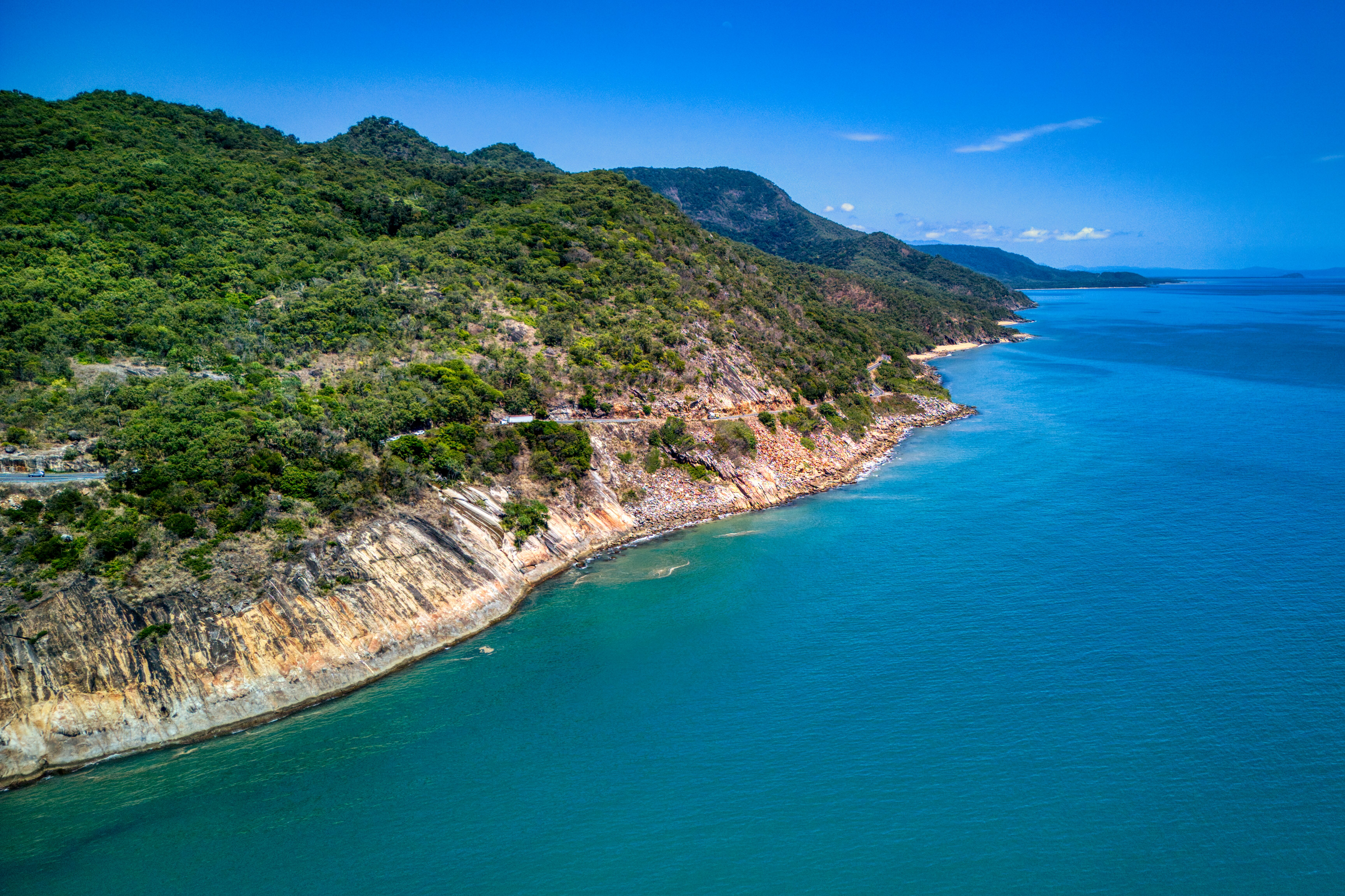
Captain Cook Highway, near Rex Lookout

The Captain Cook Highway is a short, regional highway in Queensland that originates in Cairns and terminates in Mossman, where it joins Mossman-Daintree Road, continuing to Daintree. It is a state-controlled regional road (number 20A).

The highway is used to connect the CBD of Cairns to the Northern Beaches, a collection of suburbs that comprise the northern section of Cairns. It is also used by many tourists travelling to the town of Port Douglas, north of Cairns. Apart from being a link between two tourist locations, the Captain Cook Highway is a scenic highway that winds alongside the coast of the tropical seaside rainforest heading towards Port Douglas and Daintree National Park.

== Route description ==
The Captain Cook Highway commences at the northern end of the Bruce Highway (Mulgrave Road), in the Cairns CBD. It runs through the CBD and the suburbs of Cairns North and Aeroglen as Sheridan Street, with a speed limit of 60km/h. In this section, it intersects with Airport Drive, providing a connection to Cairns Airport. After the intersection with Aeroglen Drive, the northerly and southerly directions of the highway become separated by a median and the speed limit increases to 80km/h. It runs as National Route 1 north past the suburbs of Machans Beach, Holloways Beach, and Yorkeys Knob, until it reaches the intersection of the Cairns Western Arterial Road towards the Redlynch Valley.

As of 25 November 2021, the highway branches off from this intersection onto the Smithfield Bypass (now renamed Kudakai Crossland Connection); a two-lane highway which follows a path to the east of the Smithfield business centre. This was constructed at a cost of $164 million.

The original route continues north to the intersection of the Kennedy Highway in Smithfield, next to the Smithfield Shopping Centre. From this intersection, the highway continues north to the intersection of McGregor road, next to James Cook University, where it joins with the Smithfield Bypass. The two routes recombine and continue north as State Route 44 past the suburbs of Trinity Park, Trinity Beach, Kewarra Beach, Clifton Beach, Palm Cove, and Ellis Beach. It then continues along the coast through Wangetti, Craiglie and Killaloe, then west between Bonnie Doon in the north and Cassowary and Shannonvale in the south, where it passes the exit to Mossman-Mount Molloy Road (State Route 44) to the south, before turning north-west to its terminus in Mossman.

== History ==
A coastal highway connecting Cairns to Port Douglas was first proposed in 1918.

Construction of the original route began in 1931, and the highway was officially opened on 17 December 1933. It originally opened as a toll road. Its original route north of Cairns passed through Stratford and crossed the Barron River over the Kamerunga Lower Bridge, as the planned bridge at Stratford was beset by delays. The wooden highway bridge at Stratford was opened to traffic while still incomplete via temporary spans after an unnamed cyclone caused flooding that swept away parts of the unfinished bridge in 1934.

The highway was originally unsealed, and sealing works took place through 1938–1940, with the last section sealed in 1945. The highway's toll was abolished in 1946.

In 1977, construction of a new bridge crossing over the Barron River at Stratford took place. The bridge officially opened on 16 December 1977. The bridge was named the William Walter Mason Bridge on 12 August 1978. The bridge and highway were duplicated at Stratford in 1988.

The highway was closed in December 2023 after heavy rain linked to Cyclone Jasper caused landslips, debris and significant damage north of Palm Cove to Port Douglas. Reopening occurred on the 20 January 2024.

== Upgrades ==
=== Upgrade planning ===
A project to analyse options for upgrading a section of road from Poolwood Road roundabout to Endeavour Road, at a cost of $620,000, was to be completed by mid-2021.

=== Upgrade construction ===
A project to upgrade the road between Cairns and Smithfield, at a cost of $359 million, was expected to commence construction in June 2022.

== Mossman–Mount Molloy Road ==
Mossman–Mount Molloy Road
- Location: Captain Cook Highway, Bonnie Doon, Cassowary, Shannonvale tripoint to Mulligan Highway, Mount Molloy
- Length: 28.4 km (17.6 mi)
- Route number: 44

Mossman–Mount Molloy Road is a state-controlled district road (number 653). It starts at an intersection with Captain Cook Highway (State Route 44) at the Bonnie Doon, Cassowary, Shannonvale tripoint. It runs south as State Route 44, for 28.4 kilometres (17.6 mi) to Mount Molloy, where it ends at an intersection with Mulligan Highway. The road has no major intersections.

== Major intersections ==
LGA	Location	km	mi	Destinations	Notes
Cairns	Cairns	0	0.0	Bruce Highway (Florence Street) (Queensland Highway A1) – south–west – Woree / Sheridan Street – south–east – Cairns CBD / Florence Street – north–east – Cairns waterfront	Southern end of Captain Cook Highway (National Route 1) Continues north–west as Sheridan Street.
Barron River		6.9	4.3	William Walter Mason Bridges	
Cairns	Smithfield	12.1	7.5	Cairns Western Arterial Road (State Route 91) – south – Kamerunga / National Route 1 – north–west – Smithfield / Smithfield Bypass – north – Smithfield/Trinity Park	Smithfield Bypass is now renamed Kudakai Crossland Connection. Captain Cook Highway now follows the bypass.
Cairns	Smithfield	13.1	8.1	Kennedy Highway (National Route 1) – west – Kuranda	Captain Cook Highway continues north as State Route 44
Douglas	Port Douglas	61.1	38.0	Port Douglas Road – north–east – Port Douglas	
Douglas	Bonnie Doon / Shannonvale / Cassowary tripoint	71.2	44.2	Mossman Mount Molloy Road (State Route 44) – south – Mount Molloy	Captain Cook Highway continues west with no route number
Douglas	Mossman	75.4	46.9	Mill Street – east – Mossman CBD / Mossman Daintree Road (Foxton Avenue) – north–west – Daintree / Junction Road – north–east – Bonnie Doon	Northern end of Captain Cook Highway
1.000 mi = 1.609 km; 1.000 km = 0.621 mi: Route transition

== Gallery ==
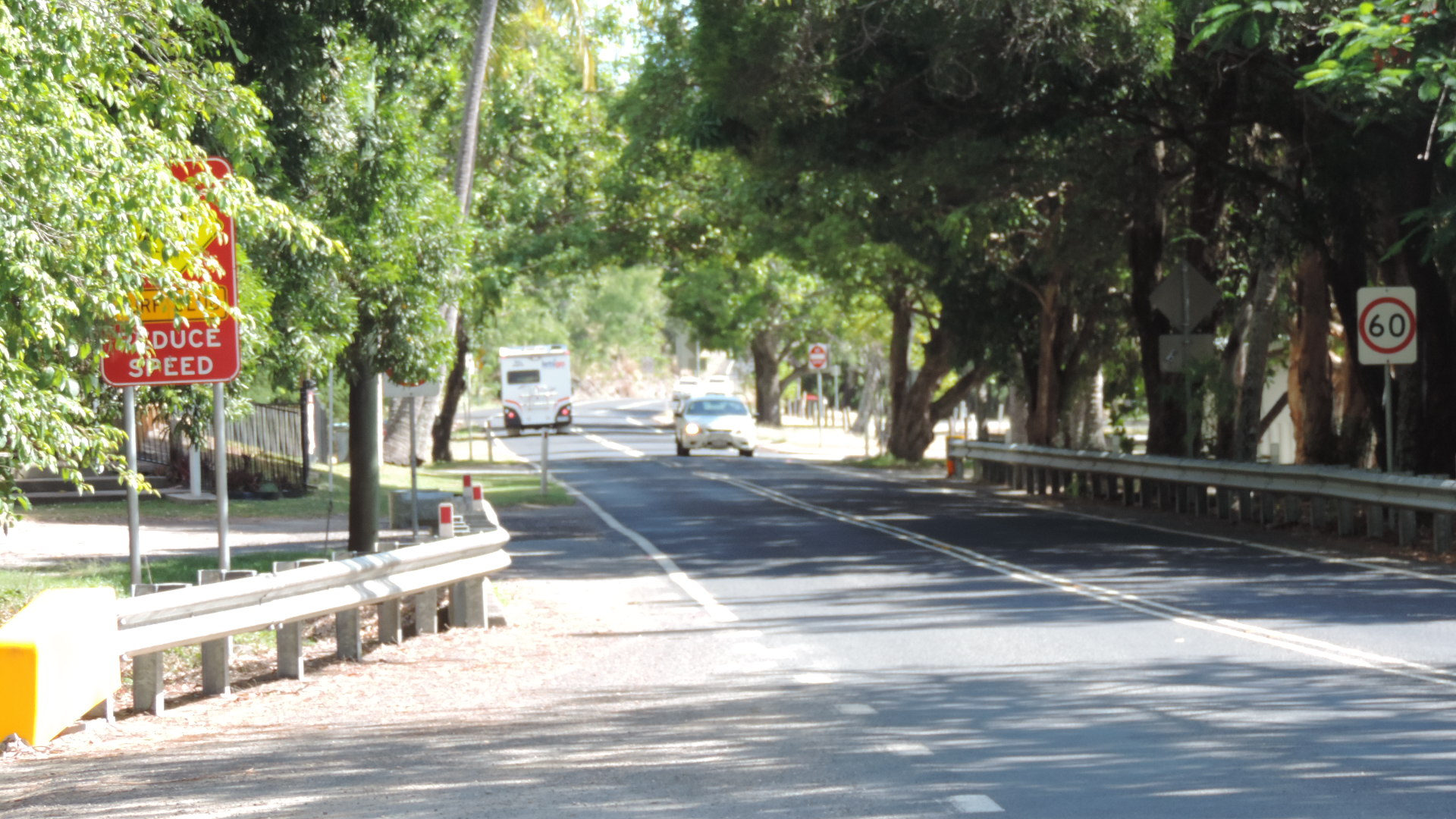
Captain Cook Highway, Ellis Beach, 2018

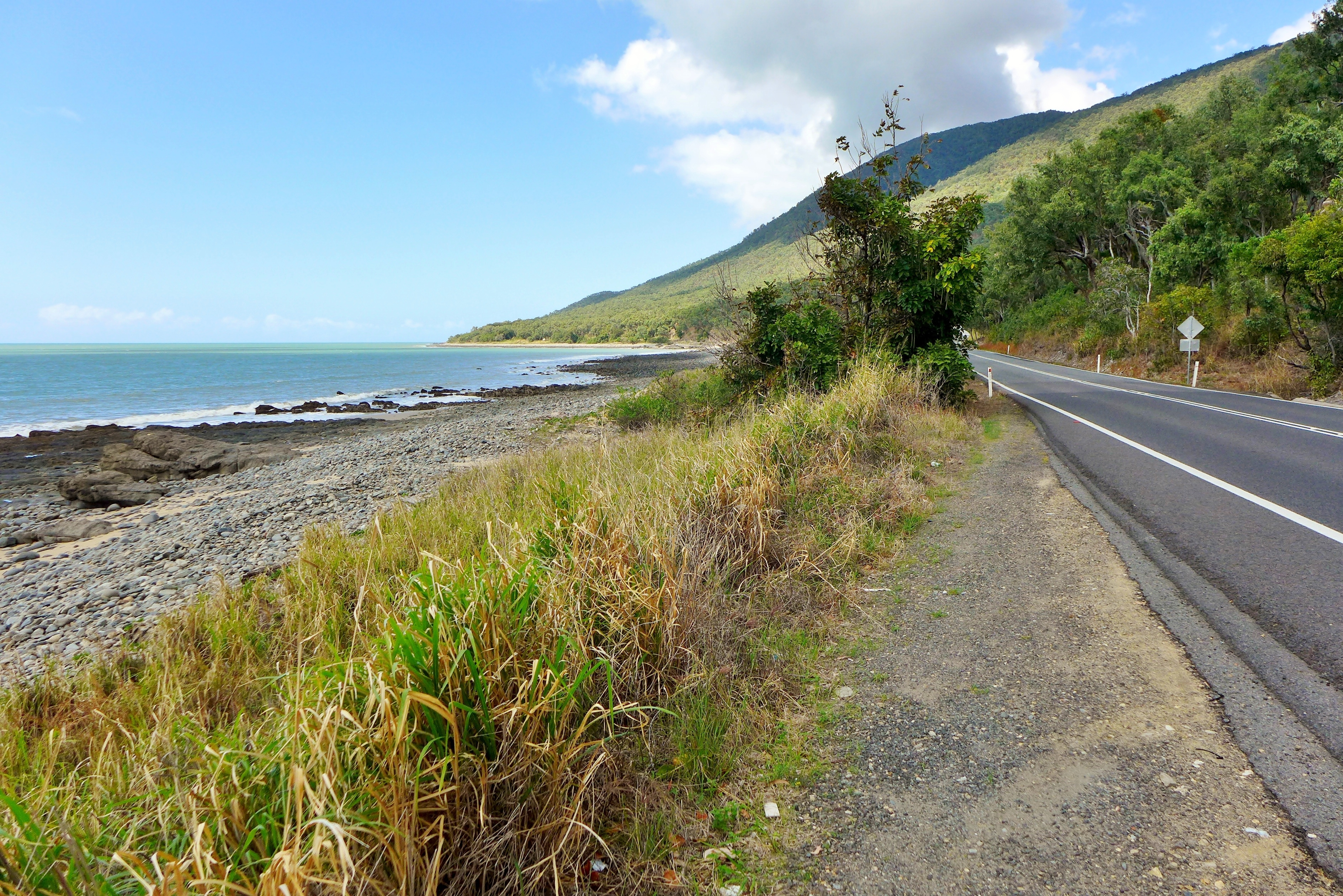
Captain Cook Highway, Wangetti, 2015

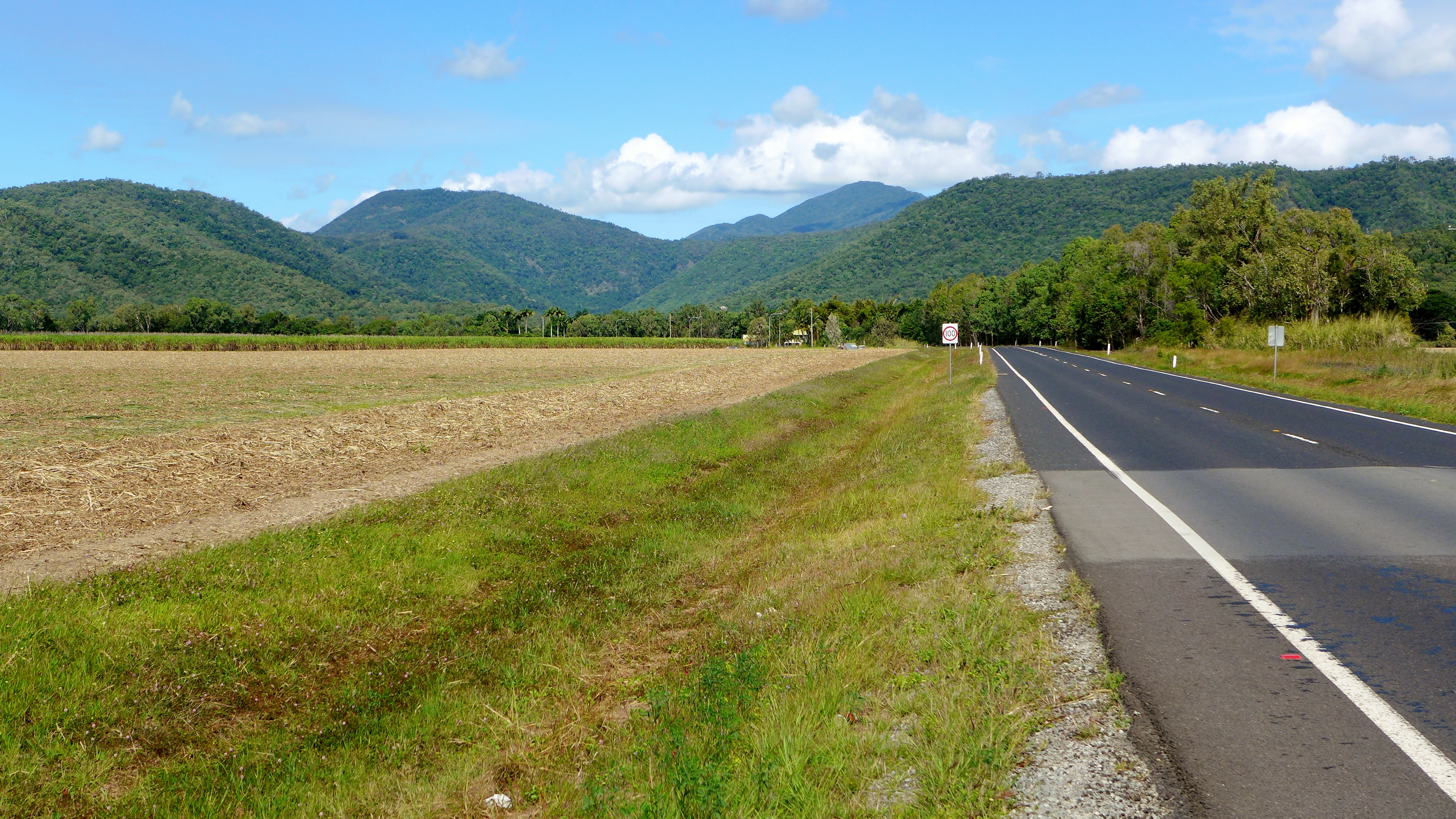
Captain Cook Highway, Craiglie, 2015

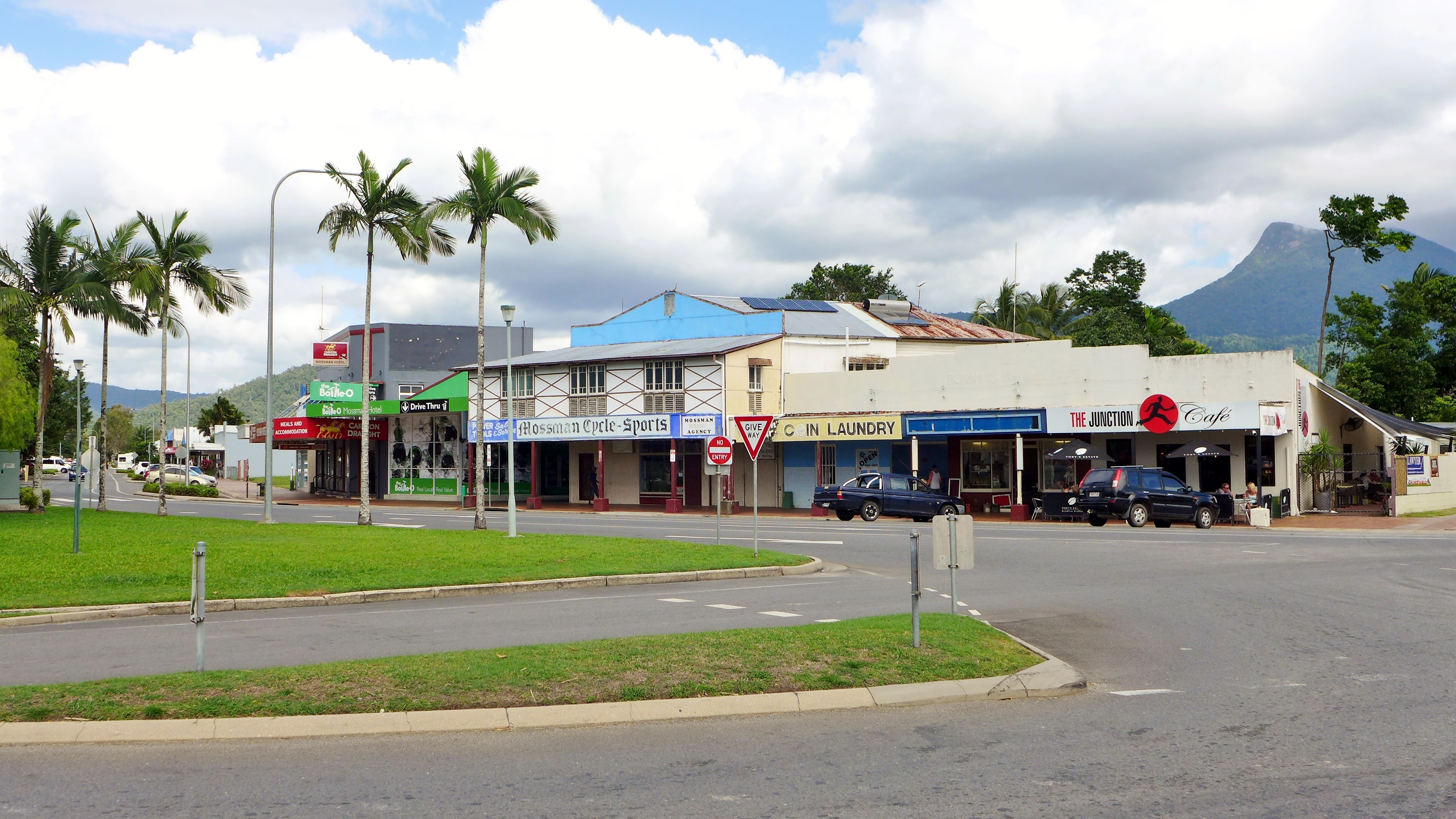
Captain Cook Highway at Mossman, 2015

== See also ==
- Highways in Australia
- List of highways in Queensland
