= Shire of Douglas =

- Local government area
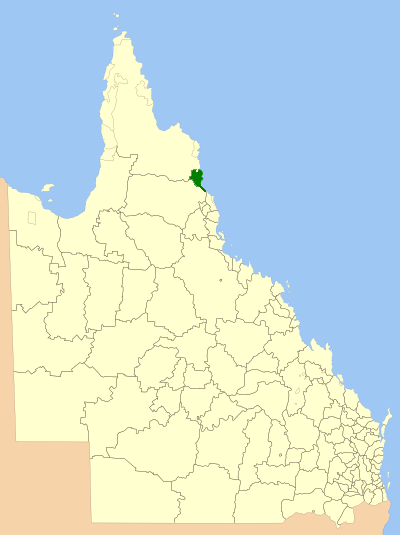
- Location within Queensland

- Interactive map of Shire of Douglas
- Country: Australia
- State: Queensland
- Region: Far North Queensland
- Established: 1880 until 2008, 2014
- Council seat: Mossman

Government
  - Mayor: Lisa Scomazzon

Area
  - Total: 2,428 km^{2} (937 sq mi)

Population
  - Total: 12,337 (2021 census)
  - Density: 5.0811/km^{2} (13.160/sq mi)
- Website: Shire of Douglas
LGAs around Shire of Douglas
Cook	Cook & Wujal Wujal	Coral Sea
Mareeba	Shire of Douglas	Coral Sea
Mareeba	Cairns	Cairns

The Shire of Douglas is a local government area in Far North Queensland. It is located on the coast north of the city of Cairns. The shire, administered from the town of Mossman, covers an area of 2,428 square kilometres (937.5 sq mi), and existed as a local government entity from 1880 until 2008, when it was amalgamated with the City of Cairns to become the Cairns Region. Following a poll in 2013, the Shire of Douglas was re-established on 1 January 2014.

The major industries are tourism and sugar production. Minor industries include tropical fruit and beef.

In the 2021 census, the Shire of Douglas had a population of 12,337 people.

== History ==
Kuku Yalanji (also known as Gugu Yalanji, Kuku Yalaja, and Kuku Yelandji) is an Australian Aboriginal language of the Mossman and Daintree areas of North Queensland. The language region includes areas within the local government area of Shire of Douglas and Shire of Cook, particularly the localities of Mossman, Daintree, Bloomfield River, China Camp, Maytown, Palmer, Cape Tribulation and Wujal Wujal.

Yalanji (also known as Kuku Yalanji, Kuku Yalaja, Kuku Yelandji, and Gugu Yalanji) is an Australian Aboriginal language of Far North Queensland. The traditional language region is Mossman River in the south to the Annan River in the north, bordered by the Pacific Ocean in the east and extending inland to west of Mount Mulgrave. This includes the local government boundaries of the Shire of Douglas, the Shire of Cook and the Aboriginal Shire of Wujal Wujal and the towns and localities of Cooktown, Mossman, Daintree, Cape Tribulation and Wujal Wujal. It includes the head of the Palmer River, the Bloomfield River, China Camp, Maytown, and Palmerville.

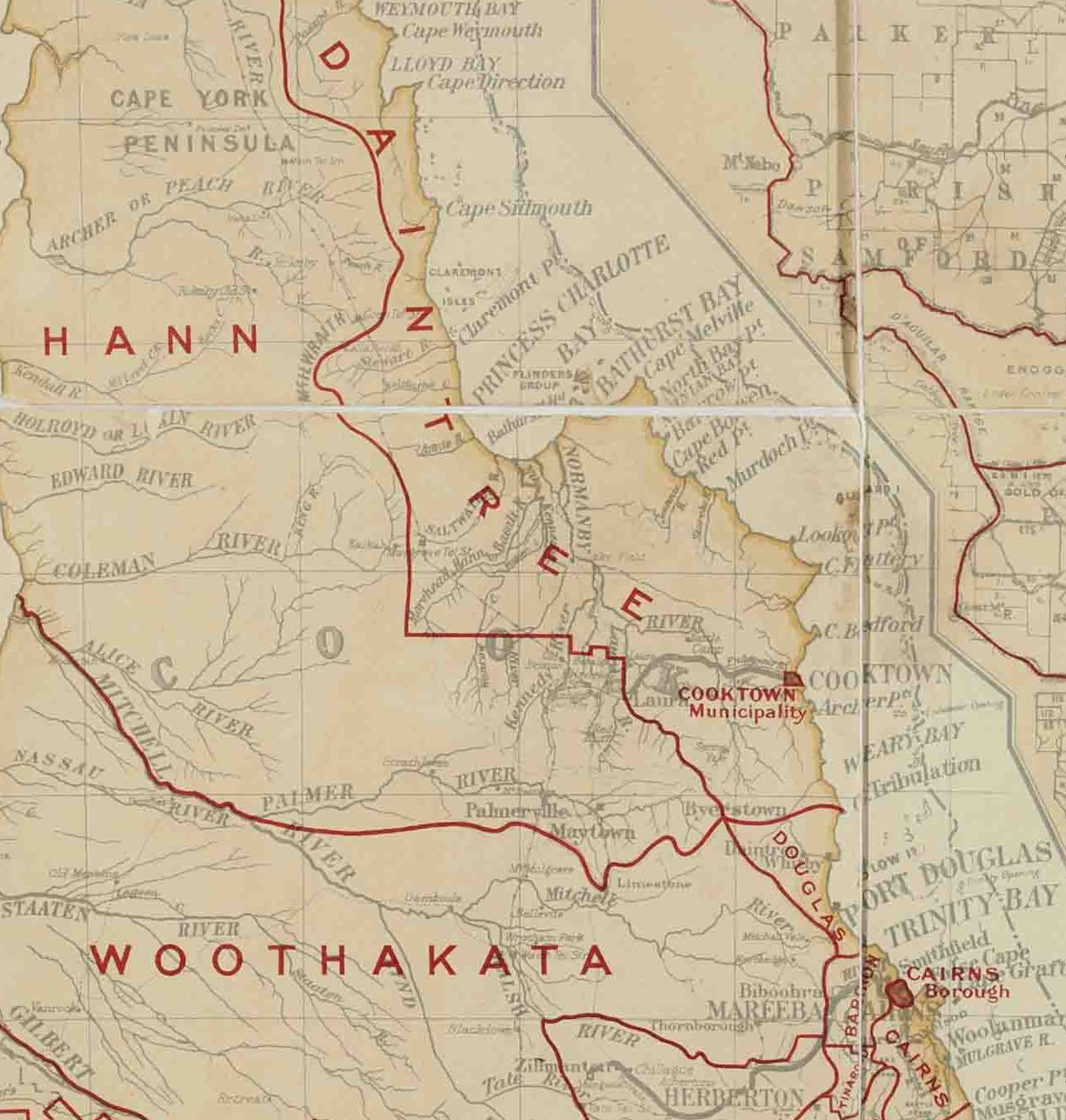
Map of Douglas Division and adjacent local government areas, March 1902

On 11 November 1879, the Cairns Division was one of the initial 74 divisions created under the Divisional Boards Act 1879. On 3 June 1880, the northern part of Cairns Division was excised to create Douglas Division.

With the passage of the Local Authorities Act 1902, Douglas Division became the Shire of Douglas on 31 March 1903.

On 15 March 2008, under the Local Government (Reform Implementation) Act 2007 passed by the Parliament of Queensland on 10 August 2007, the Shire of Douglas merged with the City of Cairns to form the Cairns Region.

In 2012, a proposal was made to de-amalgamate the Shire of Douglas from the Cairns Region. On 6 December 2012, the Queensland Minister for Local Government, the Hon. David Crisafulli, granted the people of the former Douglas Shire a vote on possible de-amalgamation from the Cairns Regional Council, even though the Queensland Treasury Corporation had calculated the costs to be too high a burden on the few ratepayers of this small Shire, and the Shire to be unviable in the long term. Despite strong opposition from many parties, on 9 March 2013 the citizens of the former Douglas shire voted in a referendum to de-amalgamate with a 57.6% vote . The shire was re-established on 1 January 2014.

== Towns and localities ==
The Douglas Shire Council's administrative centre is in Mossman.

The Shire of Douglas includes the following settlements:

- Mossman
- Port Douglas
- Bamboo
- Bonnie Doon
- Bloomfield^{1}
- Cape Kimberley
- Cape Tribulation
- Cassowary
- Cooya Beach
- Cow Bay
- Craiglie
- Dagmar
- Daintree
- Dayman Point
- Dedin
- Degarra
- Diwan
- Ellis Beach^{2}
- Finlay Vale
- Forest Creek
- Four Mile Beach
- Killaloe
- Low Isles
- Lower Daintree
- Miallo
- Mossman Gorge
- Mowbray
- Newell
- Noah
- Oak Beach
- Port Douglas
- Rocky Point
- Shannonvale
- Spurgeon
- Stewart Creek Valley
- Syndicate
- Thornton Beach
- Upper Daintree
- Wangetti
- Whyanbeel
- Wonga Beach

^{1} – shared with the Shire of Cook
^{2} – until 1995, it was part of the Shire, now it's part of the Cairns Region

== Libraries ==
The Douglas Shire Council operates public libraries at Mossman and Port Douglas.

== Demographics ==
Year	Population	Notes
1933	2,901	
1947	2,493	
1954	3,100	
1961	3,354	
1966	3,919	
1971	4,072	
1976	4,746	
1981	5,957	
1986	7,750	
1991	12,440	
1996	12,980	
2001 census	13,966	
2006 census	10,193	
2011	11,380	Shire of Douglas did not exist at this time but was part of the Cairns Region.
2016 census	11,714	
2021 census	12,337	

== Council ==
Douglas Shire Council

Type
- Type: Unicameral

Leadership
- Mayor: Lisa Scomazzon, [Independent]
- Deputy Mayor: Roy Zammataro, Independent

Structure
- Seats: 5 elected representatives, including a Mayor and 4 councillors
- Political groups: Majority: Independents (5)

Elections
- Last election: 16 March 2024
- Next election: March 2028

Below is the current council, elected in 2024:

Name	Party	Notes
Michael Rees	Independent	
Lisa Scomazzon	Independent	Mayor
Abigail Noli	Independent	
Damian Meadows	Independent	Deputy Mayor
Roy Zammataro	Independent	

=== Election results ===
2024 Queensland mayoral elections: Douglas Shire
Party	Candidate	Votes	%	±%
Independent	Lisa Scomazzon	3,427	48.38	
Independent	David Haratsis	3,150	44.47	
Independent	Stacy Wilkinson	506	7.14	-
Total formal votes		7,083	97.27	
Informal votes		199	2.73	
Turnout		7,282		
Independent gain from Independent		Swing		

2024 Queensland local elections: Douglas Shire
Party	Candidate	Votes	%	±%
Independent	Damian Meadows (elected 1)	3,487	12.54	
Independent	Roy Zammataro (elected 2)	3,459	12.44	
Independent	Abigail Noli (elected 3)	3,160	11.37	
Independent	Michael Rees (elected 4)	2,604	9.37	
Independent	Jeremy Blockey	2,588	9.31	
Independent	Bill Allison	2,372	8.53	
Independent	Chris Barber	2,274	8.18	
Independent	Peter McKeown	2,114	7.60	
Independent	Pia McKeown	2,006	7.22	
Independent	Terry Melchert	1,712	6.16	{{{change}}}
Independent	Peter Wood	1,068	3.84	{{{change}}}
Independent	Sara Mulcahy	956	3.44	{{{change}}}
Total formal votes		6,950	95.38	
Informal votes		337	4.62	

2020 Queensland mayoral elections: Douglas Shire
Party	Candidate	Votes	%	±%
Independent	Michael Kerr	3,386	54.95	+54.95
Independent	Julia Leu	2,776	45.05	−20.07
Total formal votes		6,162	98.12	+0.50
Informal votes		118	1.88	−0.50
Turnout		6,280		
Independent gain from Independent		Swing	+54.95	

2020 Queensland local elections: Douglas Shire
Party	Candidate	Votes	%	±%
Independent	Lisa Scomazzon (elected 1)	3,951	16.40	
Independent	Peter McKeown (elected 2)	3,527	14.64	
Independent	Roy Zammataro (elected 3)	3,179	13.20	
Independent	Noli Abigail (elected 4)	2,959	12.28	
Independent	Natalie Johnson	2,888	11.99	
Independent	Kym Rowley	2,338	9.71	
Independent	Bruce Clarke	2,021	8.39	
Independent	Terry Melchert	1,967	8.17	
Independent	Steve Cruickshank	1,258	5.22	
Total formal votes		6,022	96.03	
Informal votes		249	3.97	

== Chairmen and mayors ==
The following were the chairmen and mayors of the Shire of Douglas in its first incarnation:

Term	Incumbent
1900	Andrew Jack
1901–1903	James Reynolds
1904–1905	Richard Augustine "Dick" Donnelly
1906	William Mackay
1907	Daniel Joseph Kirwan
1908	Robert David Low
1909	Richard James Walsh
1910	Robert Punton Tunnie (first term)
1911–1912	Frederick "Fred" Thompson
1913	James Patrick Reynolds (first term)
1914	Robert Punton Tunnie (second term)
1915–1921	James Patrick Reynolds (second term)
1921–1927	John Quill
1927–1933	Severin Berner "Barney" Andreassen
1933–1955	Raymond David Rex
1955–1964	Ernest William Berzinski
1964–1967	George Quaid Jr
1967–1970	J.S. Allen
1970–1981	Onslow Rutherford Andrews
1981–1991	Anthony Mijo
1991–2008	Mike Berwick

The following were the mayors of Shire of Douglas in its second incarnation:

Term	Incumbent
2014–2020	Julia Leu
2020–2024	Michael John Kerr
2024–current	Lisa Jayne Scomazzon
