= Exchange Hotel, Mossman =

Exchange Hotel
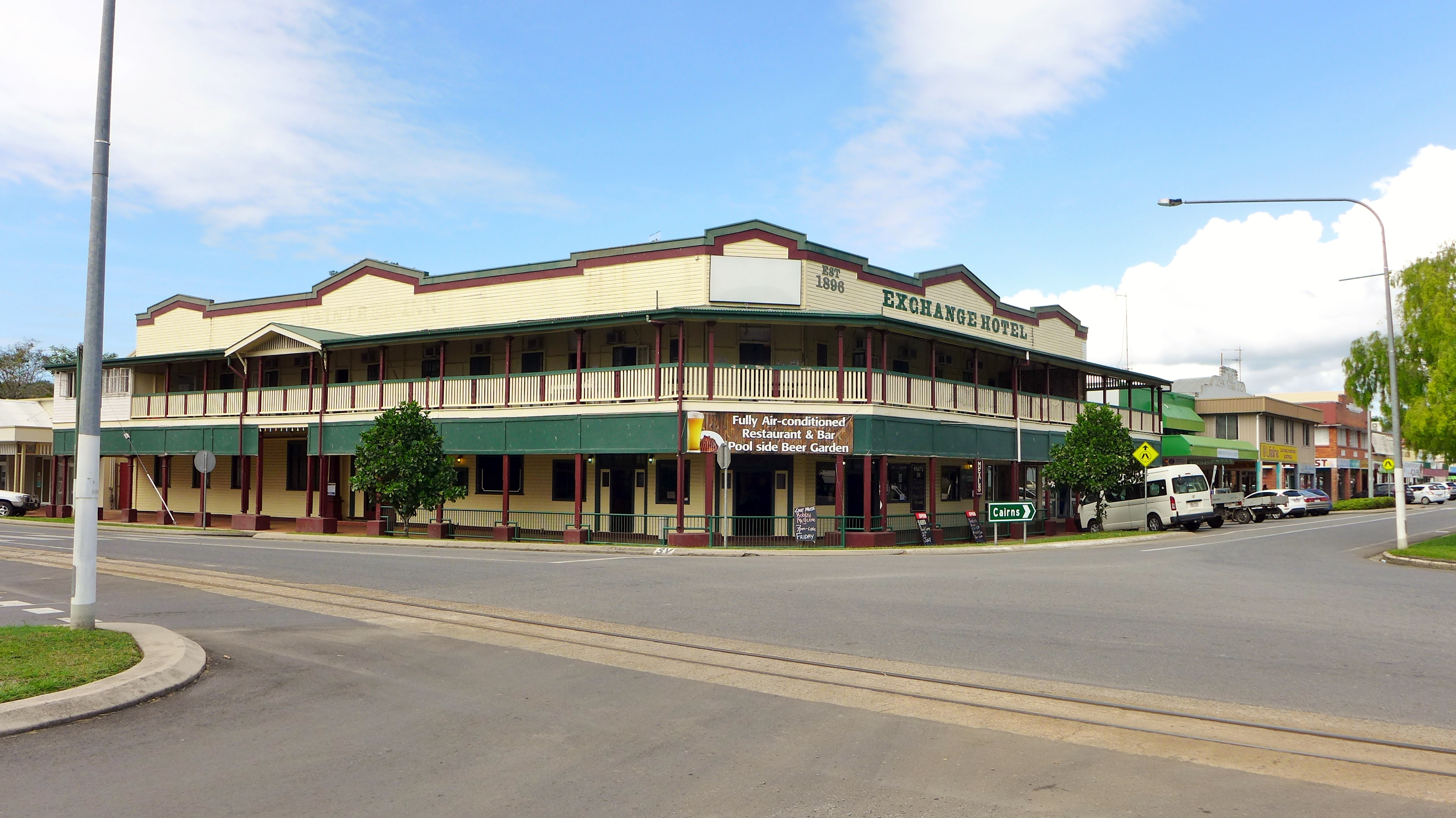
- Exchange Hotel, 2015

- Location within Queensland Location within Australia
- 16.4595°S 145.3741°E
- Location: 2 Front Street, Mossman, Shire of Douglas, Queensland, Australia

History
- Design period: 1919–1930s (interwar period)
- Built: 1934–1935

Site notes
- Architect: Vibert McKirdy Brown

Queensland Heritage Register
- Official name: Daintree Inn/Former Exchange Hotel, Exchange Hotel Mossman
- Type: state heritage (built)
- Designated: 9 November 2012
- Reference no.: 602803
- Significant period: 1935–present
- Significant components: lounge/recreation room, shop/s, bar

Exchange Hotel is a heritage-listed hotel at 2 Front Street, Mossman, Shire of Douglas, Queensland, Australia. It was designed by Vibert McKirdy Brown and built from 1934 to 1935. It was also known as Daintree Inn. It was added to the Queensland Heritage Register on 9 November 2012.

== History ==
The Exchange Hotel is the second timber hotel to stand on the prominent site at the corner of Front and Mill streets in Mossman, a sugar town located about 75 kilometres (47 mi) north of Cairns. Built in 1934–35 to replace the first Exchange Hotel (c. 1896), which was badly damaged in a March 1934 cyclone, the second Exchange Hotel was designed to appeal to a tourist clientele. Tourism to the district increased after the opening of the Cook Highway in 1933, with road trips to Mossman and the town of Daintree among the local attractions promoted to visitors to far north Queensland.

Mossman lies inland from Port Douglas, on the flood-plain of the Mossman River between the Great Dividing Range and the coast. Cedar stands on the Mossman River were logged from 1874 and agricultural settlers followed the timber getters from the late 1870s, supplying fodder, maize, rice and tropical fruits to the Palmer River (1873) and Hodgkinson goldfield (1876).

Port Douglas was established in 1877 as a port for the Hodgkinson goldfield and Mossman was founded in the mid-1880s with the subdivision of land, located south of the Mossman River, owned by Daniel Hart and Thomas Wilson. The Exchange Hotel stands on part of Portion 72, selected by Wilson in 1879. Although early selectors attempted mixed agriculture, poor soil and high rainfall meant that the land around Mossman was more suited to sugar cane cultivation.

Initially, Queensland sugar cane was grown on large plantations, using indentured South Sea Islander labour, and nine sugar plantations (each with their own mill to crush sugar cane) were established in far north Queensland between 1878 and 1891. However, six of these had closed by 1891. The Brie Brie sugar plantation near Mossman operated a sugar mill between 1884 and 1888.

Several factors influenced the decline of the plantation system and its replacement by small farms supplying large central sugar mills. A drop in sugar prices in 1884, progressive restrictions on the use of non-European labour in the sugar industry from 1885, and government promotion of closer settlement by European "yeoman" farmers (owners of smaller landholdings), led to an end in the trade in South Sea Islander labour. The 1893 Sugar Works Guarantee Act provided loans to groups of farmers who mortgaged their land to the government, formed a company and built a co-operatively owned sugar mill to process their cane.

In far north Queensland, government funding was provided for the Mulgrave Central Mill (Gordonvale, first crush 1896) and the Mossman Central Mill (first crush 1897). The Mossman Central Mill Company, which was formed in 1894, purchased 20 acres (8.1 ha) of Wilson's Portion 72 in 1896, and Mill Street, which ran east to the mill from the main north–south road, became the commercial heart of Mossman.

The sugar industry spurred Mossman's development. Two galvanised iron hotels were moved to Front Street from Craiglie in 1894, to become the Royal Hotel and Mossman Hotel, and the Queens Hotel was built in 1896. Mossman was linked to Port Douglas by a tramway in 1900 (sugar was shipped from Port Douglas from 1897 to 1958), and a tramway depot was located at the corner of Mill and Front Streets, near the Mossman Triangle. The town had five hotels by 1910, including the Exchange, Mossman, Royal, Post Office and Queens. After the 1911 cyclone damaged buildings in both Mossman and Port Douglas, businesses and government buildings located at Port Douglas gravitated to Mossman.

One of the early sugar suppliers to the Mossman Central Mill was Denis O'Brien, whose wife Teresa ran the first Exchange Hotel. O'Brien operated a hotel in Cooktown with Teresa from 1874, moved to Port Douglas in 1877 and opened the North Australian Hotel (now the Central Hotel). In 1893 O'Brien selected land near Mossman. He grew sugar and was a director of the Mossman Central Mill, with his son Edward Joseph O'Brien (one of eight children) later serving as chairman of directors for many years.

FW Buchanan built the first Exchange Hotel for the O'Brien's c. 1896, and Teresa O'Brien is listed in the 1897 Pugh's Almanac as running the Exchange Hotel in Mossman. In 1904 the eldest O'Brien daughter, Kate, married Daniel J Kirwan, who became the licensee of the hotel in 1905, the year Denis O'Brien died at his property "Finlayvale".

The Exchange Hotel was originally one storey, but had a second storey by 16 March 1911 when a cyclone destroyed the upper floor. The hotel was repaired and continued to serve the town, despite being damaged again in a 1920 cyclone. Licensees of the hotel between 1914 and 1932 included EJ O'Brien, Sarah Ann Agnew, William Hyslop, Ellen Maud Petersen, Helena Norman McKenna, Teresa Nugent (nee O'Brien) and Ellen Constance O'Brien.

Meanwhile, government encouragement of the sugar industry meant that there were 4238 small canegrowers in Queensland by 1911. Most of Queensland's existing sugar mills were established by 1925, and an influx of cane-cutters, including Southern Europeans, before and after World War I boosted the population and economy of far north Queensland. Many of the cane-cutters went on to operate their own farms. The Queensland sugar industry flourished in the 1920s and 1930s, due to government subsidies. When combined with the Forgan Smith Labor Government's Unemployment Relief Scheme (civic building and infrastructure projects), a burst of building activity resulted in Mossman and other far north Queensland sugar towns.

In the 1930s economic activity in Mossman was further increased with the opening of the Mossman District Hospital in 1930; the completion of the Cook Highway between Cairns and Mossman in 1933 (as part of the Unemployment Relief Scheme); and the opening of the Mossman Shire Hall and Douglas Shire Council Chambers in 1937. Mossman was by now the administrative centre of the Douglas Shire (established in 1903 to replace the Douglas Divisional Board).

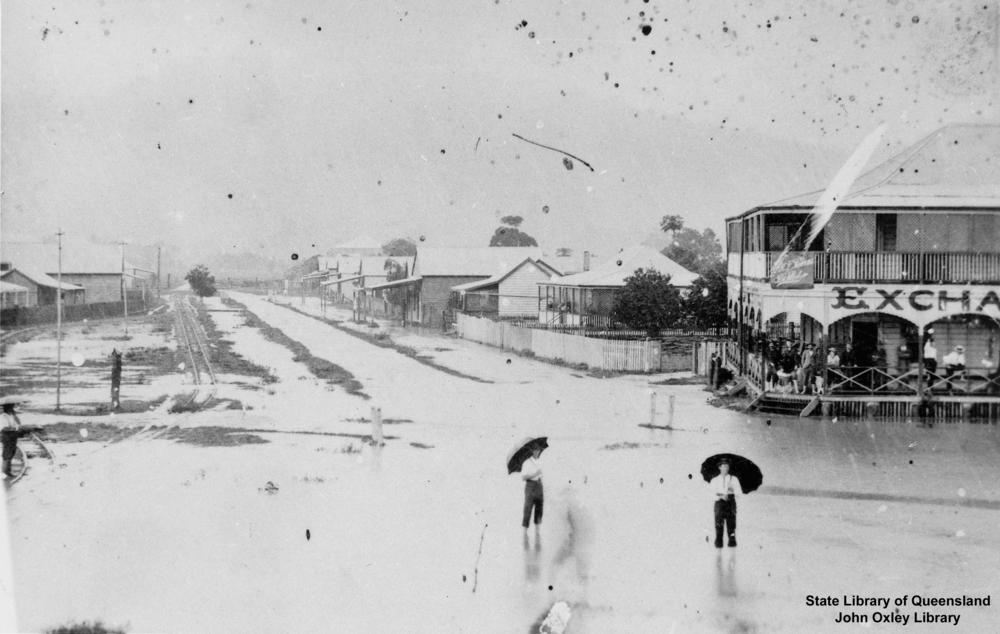
Exchange Hotel during the 1934 floods

During this period of prosperity for Mossman a cyclone on 12 March 1934 once again heavily damaged the top storey of the Exchange Hotel, but this time the whole building was replaced, with the timber sourced from the Daintree Mill. In April 1934 tenders were invited for the erection of a hotel in timber and concrete at Mossman, for Mrs T Nugent, the architect Vibert McKirdy Brown of Atherton. Tenders were also called for the removal of the old Exchange Hotel. Teresa Nugent was the daughter of Denis and Teresa O'Brien, and along with her sisters Anne Kenny and Bridget Fynn, assumed ownership of the land on which the hotel stood in August 1934.

VM Brown was a well known local architect who practiced in Far North Queensland from the 1920s to 1940s. Born in South Africa c.1887, by 1916 he was living in north Queensland where he enlisted and served in the army during World War I, listing his pre-war trade as "contractor". From 1925 Brown advertised himself as an architect in Atherton and over the next two decades he completed a wide variety of buildings throughout the Cairns and Atherton Tablelands area. Characteristics of Brown's works include art deco and simplified classical style ornamentation, particularly raised banding on facades.

Brown had a long association with the Atherton District Hospital Board, and was responsible for many of the Atherton Hospital buildings constructed in the 1920s and 30s. Brown also designed many buildings for the Catholic Church in the region, including St Augustine's Church School and Convent at Mossman (1934). He also designed several buildings for the Returned Sailors' and Soldiers' Imperial League of Australia, including their club rooms on the Esplanade in Cairns (1938). In his home town of Atherton, Brown designed many civic and commercial buildings, including the Tinaroo Shire Council Chambers (1928), various shops, and the Grand Hotel (1933) on the corner of Main and Vernon streets. In Mossman, he designed the former Jack and Newell Building (1936), which stands opposite the Exchange Hotel on the corner of Mossman Street, Mill Street and Junction Road. Other notable works by Brown include an extension to Boland's Department Store in Cairns (1936, now the Bolands Centre), the Rex Theatre in Cairns (1938), and Mareeba Fire Station (1939). Brown ceased practicing as an architect in the late 1940s and died in 1957, aged 70.

The new Exchange Hotel capitalised upon the existing far north Queensland tourist trade, which had been increasing since the 1880s. During the 19th century far north Queensland was seen as a romantic, exotic and tropical destination, with visitors mainly interested in the natural beauties of the area, such as landscapes, numerous waterfalls and the Chillagoe Caves. The health benefits of the spa at Innot Springs, and the coolness of mountain locations of Herberton and Kuranda, were also attractive.

However, transport infrastructure was limited to rough tracks and railways constructed to access mining, timber and agricultural resources. It was not until the 1920s, with the rise of the motor car and the construction of tourist roads by the Queensland Government, that tourism accelerated in the region.

In the 1920s and 30s, Cairns was the major entry point for visitors to far north Queensland, and had an established reputation as a tourist centre and "tropical winter resort." Arriving by the boat load, the number of tourists needing accommodation in Cairns often exceeded the number of "first class" hotel rooms available, with those missing out having to sleep on board their ships. The completion of the Brisbane–Cairns railway in 1924 (called the "Sunshine Route" from 1929) opened another option for reaching Cairns. By 1925, the Hides Hotel and the Strand Hotel were the only two first class accommodation houses in Cairns, and the need for a greater number and higher standard of accommodation options to foster the tourist trade, on the Atherton Tablelands as well as Cairns, was becoming more widely recognised.

From 1891 tourists could access the Atherton Tablelands by rail, but the construction of the Gillies Highway (Gordonvale to Yungaburra) in 1926 enabled the White Car Line to transport tourists by road, increasing access to attractions like Lake Barrine, Lake Eacham, the Mount Hypipamee Crater and the Curtain Fig Tree at Yungaburra. Other popular attractions in the region in the interwar period included the Barron Falls, the Maze, Fairyland Tea Gardens, and Dodd's butterfly collection at Kuranda, the "Jungle" at Malanda, and Paronella Park south of Innisfail. Favoured seaside resorts in the 1920s included Double Island Beach, Yorkey's Knob, Turtle Bay, Second Beach, False Cape, and Browns Bay, while visitation to the Great Barrier Reef occurred with launch trips to Green Island. The Palmerston Highway (Innisfail to Ravenshoe) opened in 1935 and allowed road access to the southern tablelands.

As more places became accessible, tourist hotels were constructed to attract and accommodate visitors. Two of the largest hotels in far north Queensland were constructed at Yungaburra and Malanda. The Lake Eacham Hotel at Yungaburra, originally built in 1910 after the arrival of the railway line from Cairns, was considerably extended and refurbished in time for the opening of the Gillies Highway, assisting the town to develop as a tourist destination and a gateway to the Tablelands. The Malanda Hotel had its major phase of construction in 1911 after the arrival of the railway line, but it too benefited greatly from the increased tourist trade brought about by the Gillies Highway. Already a large, two storey timber hotel, it underwent an expansion in 1928 that increased the number of bedrooms to 60 and included the addition of a "tropical lounge".

Apart from refurbishments and extensions, many new hotels (or total rebuilds of existing hotels) of various sizes were constructed throughout far north Queensland in the late-1920s and 1930s, including: the Tully's Stratford Hotel (1926, now Barron River Hotel); Ravenshoe Hotel (1927); Criterion Hotel at South Johnstone (1930); Hambledon Hotel at Edmonton (approx 1930); several hotels in Cairns, Innisfail and Gordonvale; the Grand Hotel in Atherton (1933); the Silkwood Hotel (1938); plus the Royal Hotel (1932) and the Post Office Hotel (1932) in Mossman.

The Mossman area's scenery was promoted as an attraction in the 1920s. It was accessed from Port Douglas by road or tramway, and cars and drivers could be hired in Mossman. However, in 1931 work began on the Cook Highway, a scenic coastal road from Cairns to the Daintree. When the section from Cairns to Mossman opened in December 1933, the Cook Highway replaced the Bump Track as the land route from Mossman to Cairns, and enabled tourists to travel on the White Car Line from Cairns to Port Douglas and Mossman and back within a day. Prior to the Highway's completion the Minister for Public Works, Henry Adam Bruce, stated that it "should prove to be one of the finest tourist roads in Australia". From Mossman, tourists could take a bus to the dairying centre of Daintree, or pay for car trips to the beach at Port Douglas, Mossman Gorge and Mt Demi, and other scenic spots.

By 1935 the Mossman Chamber of Commerce noted that the Cook Highway had been responsible for great business activity and building in Mossman, and that "the Exchange Hotel (damaged by the cyclone last year) has been entirely rebuilt, and is now one of the largest, finest, and most up-to-date in appearance and has done much to improve the look of the town". An advertisement for the hotel that year pronounced "This newly-erected Hotel is one of the most modern in North Queensland. All rooms open on to [sic] spacious balconies. Running water in every room. Septic systems. Commodious Lounges and delightful ball-room".

On 10 April 1935 the Cairns Post noted that the Exchange Hotel bar was open, with the building being put in order to accommodate boarders, "and [it] will supply a long felt want during the tourist season". Soon afterwards it was reported that the "new, modern" Exchange Hotel would be open for the Easter holidays, and that "this magnificent building is one of the most up-to-date hotels in North Queensland and offers something absolutely new in accommodation and service." In June that year the same newspaper commented that "with implicit faith in the great expansion of Mossman and the stability of this wonderfully fertile district, the owner, Mrs D. O'Brien, has had erected this really palatial hotel". It was also claimed that the hotel was the ideal rendezvous for tourists, who could by car view "some of the finest scenery in Australia".

The June 1935 article reported that the hotel had 12-foot (3.7 m) verandahs to the front and rear, with ladies' and gentlemen's bathrooms and showers on the rear verandah (Mill Street wing and Front Street wing respectively), along with lavatories (water closets) connected to a septic system. The remainder of the rear verandah was enclosed with casement windows, while the front verandah offered scenic views, including of the Good Shepherd, a rock formation on Mount Demi. The ground floor possessed a bar of large dimensions, with an Amatice refrigerator of "heroic" size in the centre, encircled by counters. There were parlours to the rear of the bar and also two small alcoves for cards. There was a "very roomy" downstairs lounge, separated from a coffee room by folding doors. These doors could be folded back to create a dance floor which occupied two thirds of the Mill Street frontage. A main stairway ascended to the first floor corridor from the lounge. Also on the ground floor were a dining room and kitchen opposite the coffee room (in a rear wing, since demolished, off the east end of the Mill Street wing), and a billiard room and shops (a hairdressing salon and a drapers shop according to a c. 1935 Licensing Inspector's report; these were located at the south end of the Front Street wing). The staff quarters were in a separate detached building (a cottage, extant in 1975 but since demolished).

There were reportedly 31 bedrooms (1940 plans of the hotel show 30) located on the first floor, which were roomy, well ventilated and lit, with a built-in corner wardrobe and corner wash basin, with running water "if necessary". There was a different colour scheme in each bedroom, and a central upstairs lounge had built-in cupboards for linen. Each bedroom opened onto both a central corridor and a verandah. A power house containing a Ruston-Hornsby engine and a generator provided electric lighting and also powered a pump for well water. Lock-up garages were provided. At this time the hotel was under the care and supervision of a company, Mesdames Kenny, Nugent and Fynn.

The Exchange Hotel was part of a pattern of increased hotel luxury in the 1930s. Hotel designs of this decade in Queensland employed a variety of modern styles, including Spanish Mission, Functionalist and Art Deco. Often on corner sites with features such as rounded facades, sweeping horizontal or vertical ornamentation, cantilevered awnings and hipped, tiled roofs, these new hotels offered a higher standard of accommodation and comfort for patrons and guests than older establishments.

Changes to legislation in 1935 completely changed the administration of the liquor laws, which became entrusted to a Licensing Commission, with the immediate objectives of a better distribution of licences throughout the state, and of raising the standard of accommodation both for the requirements of the general public and for tourist traffic. A campaign for the remodelling of licensed premises spread through the state, resulting in the improvement of accommodation offered by both country and city hotels. Typical hotel layouts included a bar (or multiple bars), cold rooms and storage, lounges and parlours, dining room and kitchen on the ground floor, with bedrooms, lounge and shared guest bathroom facilities on the first floor. Large function spaces were made possible by the use of folding doors or partitions between the lounge and dining rooms, and separate entrances for guests and bar patrons continued to be a requirement. The Commission insisted on the provision of services such as running water to all bars and bedrooms, hot and cold if possible.

In both major cities and small towns, the timber hotels of the preceding decades were gradually being renovated or replaced by brick and masonry structures, often after a devastating event such as a fire or cyclone. Particularly in smaller towns, these new hotels were seen as a sign of progress and confidence in the future. It was reported that £500,000 was spent on new hotels and hotel modernisation between November 1935 and May 1938.

The Exchange Hotel in Mossman was completed just prior to the introduction of the 1935 legislation, but incorporated all of the features required of a modern tourist hotel. The style of the building, however, is closer to that of a 1920s hotel, combining older, familiar features (such as timber construction, wide double storey verandahs, single skin verandah walls and French doors) with restrained modern detailing. It bears a resemblance to architect VM Brown's earlier hotel design, the Grand Hotel in Atherton (1933), which was constructed from concrete with timber verandahs. Another similar 1930s hotel is the Hotel Charleville (1932), constructed from brick.

The Exchange Hotel hosted a variety of guests. Despite its more traditional design, it was sufficiently upmarket to be used for civic dinners for the Minister for Public Works, HA Bruce, and later for the Governor-General Lord Gowrie and Lady Gowrie, during July 1936. A civic reception was also held for the Queensland Premier, William Forgan Smith, in October 1937, and a civic luncheon was held for the Queensland Governor, Sir Leslie Wilson and Lady Wilson, in June 1939. The hotel also provided accommodation for visiting doctors, bankers, public servants, business people, graziers and other upper-middle class visitors. As an important part of the town's social life, the Exchange Hotel was utilised for dances, Melbourne Cup parties, weddings, World War II fundraising events, and Rotary Club meetings. Commercial travellers also displayed their wares at the hotel, and consulting rooms were let to visiting professionals.

In 1953 the Exchange Hotel was still the "best hotel in town" according to the Licensing Inspector, and hotel garages existed on the land south of the Front Street wing by 1957. In 1964 it was reported that the hotel had a mixed clientele, with some travellers and some permanent boarders (sugar mill workers). Licensees at the second Exchange Hotel (after Teresa Nugent, from 1934–1950) have included Domingo Lombarte (1950–52), Minnie Martinez (1952–1957), Albert John McKenzie (1957–58), Angelo Papas (1958–60), Minnie Martinez, Ronald Desmond Neary, and Frederick James Dobbins during the 1960s, and Brian S. Geeves, Luigi Venturato, and Mary Susan Bryen during the 1970s.

Meanwhile, the land on which the hotel stands changed hands, and reduced in size. From the initial one acre owned by Teresa O'Brien, 2 roods 17.6 perches (2,470 m^{2}) was transferred to Teresa Nugent, Anne Kenny and Bridget Fynn in 1934, with a reduced frontage to Mill Street. Some land at the east end of the Mill Street frontage was sold to Lorenzo and Minnie Martinez in 1956, and they then purchased the land on which the hotel stood in 1957. Land at the south end of the Front Street frontage was sold to the Commonwealth Bank in 1963, leaving the current 1 rood 16.87 perches (1,438 m^{2}), which was then transferred to Samuel Allen and Sons Limited in 1966; to Ashwick (QLD) No 148 Pty Limited in 1985; to Exchange Hotel Pty Limited in 1987; and to Port Balcombe Pty Limited in 1988. Part of the ground floor was leased to the Totalisator Administration Board (TAB) of Queensland from 1989, and in 2009 the land was sold to Lance Sutton and Melynda Harding.

Along with changes in licensees, hotel owners and land owners, the hotel has been altered on the ground floor since 1935, including expansion of the main bar area. However, the ballroom and retail spaces survive and the parlour spaces are still readable. By the early 1950s the room on the Mill Street side of the main bar contained two parlours, while there was a wet store and another parlour on the Front Street side of the main bar, with a passage to the south; then a billiard room with barber shop, and a shoe store at the south end of the Front Street wing. The parlours on the Mill Street side of the main bar were converted into a private bar c. 1952 (this was referred to as the Ladies lounge by 1969, and was called the "Blue Moon Bar" by 1978), while the Front Street parlour became a bottling room by 1959, a bottle shop (with incorporation of the adjacent passage) c. 1980 and then an extension of the main bar with a wall demolition c. 1987.

In 1978 plans were approved for the removal of most of the kitchen and dining wing and its replacement with a smaller kitchen (completed by March 1979), the former coffee room becoming the dining room. In 1987 the bottle shop was moved southwards to the site of the original billiards room, and later a TAB operated from the southernmost shop space. New male and female toilet blocks (plus a dry store) were built to the centre rear of the ground floor in the early 1980s, and in 1988 the existing private bar counter configuration was formed, with the doorway to the street being replaced by a window. Since 1988, the TAB has been replaced by an extension of the bottle shop, for which the wall between the two original shop spaces was removed. The main bar counter, which used to form a deep "U" into the room, has been reduced in size.

The first floor has seen fewer changes between 1940 and the present: on the Front Street wing, the end of the corridor plus the four southernmost bedrooms have been converted into the manager's unit, with wall removals and enclosures of parts of the front and rear verandahs. One intact adjacent bedroom is also used by the manager. At the east end of the Mill Street wing, the end of the corridor and two bedrooms have been converted to the owner's unit, with wall removals and a bathroom addition. Two other bedrooms are intact as staff bedrooms, another bedroom (along with part of the rear verandah) is now a laundry, and parts of the front and rear verandah have been enclosed. Eighteen bedrooms were available for public use in 2012. The two original toilet and shower blocks still exist off the rear verandah, although the former ladies' bathroom is now a staff bathroom. The upstairs lounge, main internal stairway and stairway to the rear verandah are also intact. 1940s plans indicated fire escape ladders to the front verandah of each wing; these no longer exist, except for the gates in the balustrade.

Shifts in tourism and transport patterns in the late 20th century led to a decline in demand for accommodation in Mossman, as improvements to the Cook Highway and resorts at Port Douglas meant that tourists were more likely to stay overnight in Cairns or Port Douglas. Although the Bruce Highway was finally bitumened all the way from Brisbane to Cairns in the early 1960s, facilitating faster trips north in the family car, by 1965 it was noted that tourists were passing through Mossman without staying the night. As eco-tourism increased in the Daintree and Cape Tribulation area, Mossman's appeal as a scenic destination in its own right was reduced while Port Douglas evolved as the accommodation centre for the region's tourism.

From 2009 to 2013, the Exchange Hotel was renamed the Daintree Inn and catered for the family and backpacker market.

In 2013, in derelict condition, the hotel was purchased and restored by Sydney businessman Mark Collins, re-opening in 2014 once again as the Exchange Hotel.

== Description ==
The Exchange Hotel is located on a prominent corner site of the main fiveways intersection of Mossman, a small town approximately 75 kilometres (47 mi) north of Cairns in far north Queensland. Bounded by Mill Street to the north and Front Street to the west, the building has an L-shaped plan and is built to the street boundaries, with multiple entrances from both streets. A driveway runs from Front Street along the southern side of the building to a rear courtyard and outdoor bar area, separating the hotel from a two-storey commercial building. An easement from Mill Street runs along the eastern boundary of the hotel site, dividing it from a long, gable roofed building on the adjacent property.

The hotel is a large, two storey timber building, truncated at the corner, with wide verandahs to both streets over the footpaths and to the rear. The street elevations are surmounted by decorative timber parapets with simple triangular pediments, behind which a timber framed roof slopes to the rear, clad in metal roof sheeting. External walls are clad in timber chamferboards and the first floor verandah walls are single skin with exposed studwork and cross bracing. On the ground floor, there is a section of diagonal boarding and evidence of an enclosed former doorway on the west elevation. The eastern wing has a timber framed floor, while the remainder of the building sits on a concrete slab and ground floor verandah posts have raised concrete footings.

The location of the main entrance to the former ground floor lounge, now a dining room, is indicated by a gable feature in the northern verandah roof. The main entrance door is set back within a small alcove with elaborate timber surround, comprising square pilasters and a shallow triangular pediment. The double timber door with large glass windows is divided into four lights on each leaf, surrounded by fan and sidelights made of multiple rectangular panes of textured glass (sidelights sheeted over). Other early doors and windows on the street elevations have similar fanlights above, and early windows are timber framed four-light casement windows with textured glass. The rear first floor verandah is enclosed by a continuous band of casements and some side windows retain metal window hoods.

Ornamentation is modest, featuring a diamond motif evident around the main entrance doorway; in the feature panels of the first floor verandah balustrade; and underneath the painted verandah signage, where there are traces of diamond shapes that had been formed by attached timber battens (now removed). Verandah posts are chamfered with decorative timber capitals on both floors.

The building comprises public spaces on the ground floor and accommodation on the first floor. The main bar occupies the prime position in the front corner of the building, with a shop occupying the remainder of the Front Street (southern) wing. The Mill Street (eastern) wing comprises a small private bar and a large dining room containing the main staircase to the first floor. Behind the dining room, a passage below the rear verandah contains a second staircase and connects the main bar, staff and service areas, the dining room, the rear courtyard and a kitchen at the far eastern end. The first floor has a central corridor running the length of the two wings with rooms on either side and passages connecting the front and rear verandahs. At the end of each wing, rooms have been converted into staff accommodation and a manager's residence. Shared toilet and bathroom facilities adjoin the rear verandah with female amenities in the centre of the eastern wing and male amenities at the south end of the southern wing.

The main bar is a large open room with three entrance doors, one each to Mill and Front streets and one at the truncated corner. Large windows provide views to the surrounding streetscape. Having undergone many alterations, the bar layout, furniture and finishes are not early or original and do not have cultural heritage significance. At the southern end of the room there is evidence of the location of early internal walls, and an early ceiling with two fibrous plaster ceiling roses remains. A doorway at the southern end of the bar area connects through to the adjacent shop. Doors in the eastern wall lead to the rear passageway and to the private bar.

The shop (operating as a bottle shop in 2012) has also undergone many alterations, with evidence of a central wall having been removed to form one large area from two smaller shops. The ceilings feature circular plaster ceiling roses and decorative cornices. The remaining shop fit-out, furniture, shop-front glazing and entrance doors are recent and not of cultural heritage significance. A modern cold room has been installed at the rear of the northern shop area, while the rear of the southern shop area has been extended to the east, with timber verandah posts visible in the structure of the eastern wall.

The private bar is a narrow room with the bar along the western wall. Apart from the ceiling, which has two ceiling roses and decorative cornices, the fit-out, furniture and finishes of this bar are recent and not of cultural heritage significance.

The dining room occupies most of the ground floor area of the eastern wing. It retains many original and early features, such as joinery, a decorative plaster ceiling with delicate floral border and cornices, and ceiling roses matching those in the private bar and southern main bar. A wall with a large opening divides the space; with traces of a former folding door system evident in the floor and lintel (doors have been removed). The main entrance door from Mill Street opens into the western half of the room, and in the south-west corner is the main staircase, constructed from dark-stained silky oak with a small cupboard beneath. A door with fan and sidelights opposite the main entry door leads to the rear passageway. Walls throughout the room are lined with vertical V-jointed tongue and groove boards up to picture rail height and plastered above. Timber skirtings and architraves have a simple chamfered detail. The southern wall has been modified at the eastern end, to provide a doorway and two servery windows into the adjacent kitchen. The floor is polished timber floorboards, with a section of bare concrete flooring adjacent to the kitchen.

The rear passageway features timber verandah posts along the southern side and a secondary timber staircase to the first floor. The underside of the first floor verandah structure remains visible. The kitchen and storage areas constructed at the eastern end of the passageway are not of cultural heritage significance. Built up against the rear verandahs, the rear service area consists of a series of single storey blockwork structures with overlapping timber-framed roofs clad in metal sheeting. They contain loading and storage spaces, toilets, a staff office and a small outdoor bar. None of the structures with modern fabric are of cultural heritage significance.

Throughout the interior of the first floor, floors are polished timber and walls are vertical timber tongue and groove boards finished with chamfered timber detailing: picture rail, architraves and wide skirtings. Generally, flat sheeting with timber cover battens line the walls between bedrooms and the ceilings. Internal doors are high-waisted timber panelled doors with early door hardware. All unaltered bedrooms have a timber built-in corner cupboard and small basin. At the intersection of the two wings there is a lounge room with built-in cupboards along two walls.

A number of internal modifications have been made in order to provide staff accommodation including: enclosure of the end of the central passageway, alterations to walls and doorways, enclosure of verandah space and installation of facilities such as kitchens, bathrooms and a laundry room. These modifications are not of cultural heritage significance.

The front verandah is approximately 3.6 metres (12 ft) wide with a two-rail slat balustrade. Two narrow fire escape gates remain in the balustrade structure (one each in the centre of the north and west verandahs). Bedroom doors opening on to the verandah are low-waisted timber French doors with four lights per leaf and retaining early door hardware. Two sash windows are located adjacent to the diagonal north-west corner of the building. All doors and windows opening on to the verandah have textured glass. The southern end of the west verandah has been screened off from public access, and the eastern end of the north verandah has been enclosed to form a communal kitchen (not of cultural heritage significance). The toilets and bathrooms off the rear verandah have undergone some internal alterations and upgrades.

The courtyard area in the south-east corner of the hotel grounds contains an in-ground swimming pool, garden beds, palm trees and covered areas. None of these features are of cultural heritage significance.

Views to surrounding mountains and landscapes are obtained from the first floor verandahs of the Daintree Inn, as well as views of the town and the Mossman Mill chimney stack. As one of the largest buildings in the centre of town, the hotel has a strong landmark presence within the Mossman streetscape, and overlooks a triangular grassed area formed by the unusual and picturesque configuration of roads at the heart of Mossman, where five roads and a tramway intersect. The style of the hotel is complemented by other 1930s buildings in the vicinity, including the Mossman Shire Hall and Douglas Shire Council Chambers opposite on Mill Street, the former Jack and Newell building (now occupied by Mossman Hardware) on the corner of Junction Road and Mill and Mossman Streets, and the former National Bank of Australasia in Mill Street.

== Heritage listing ==
The Exchange Hotel was listed on the Queensland Heritage Register as the Daintree Inn on 9 November 2012 having satisfied the following criteria.

The place is important in demonstrating the evolution or pattern of Queensland's history.

The hotel, built in 1934–35 after a cyclone damaged its predecessor, capitalised on the 1933 completion of the Cook Highway. It is important in illustrating the growth and prosperity of the north Queensland tourism and sugar industries during the 1920s and 1930s and the associated development of Mossman as the administrative heart of the Douglas Shire.

The hotel also demonstrates a wider pattern of hotel building, rebuilding and modification in Queensland during the 1930s, undertaken with the support of the Queensland Government to encourage tourism.

The place is important in demonstrating the principal characteristics of a particular class of cultural places.

The hotel is a good regional example of a large timber interwar hotel that demonstrates the principal characteristics of its type. Built to provide comfortable accommodation for tourists, its original form and layout is legible and it retains many features including its lounge and coffee room (ballroom) space and evidence of its bars, parlours and retail facilities on the ground floor. On the first floor it retains: largely intact bedrooms, each with wash basin, opening off a central hall and onto wide verandahs; separate male and female bathroom facilities off the rear verandah; and a central guest lounge. Decorative features include ornamental plaster ceilings in the public ground floor spaces, battened sheet ceilings to the first floor rooms and generously sized timber joinery including built-in cabinets.

The place is important because of its aesthetic significance.

Situated on a prominent corner site, and as the largest of Mossman's three hotels, the place has landmark presence. It also contributes to a streetscape of 1930s buildings, including the Mossman Shire Hall, the former Jack and Newell building, and the former National Bank of Australasia in Mill Street.
