= Mossman, Queensland =

Mossman
- Town
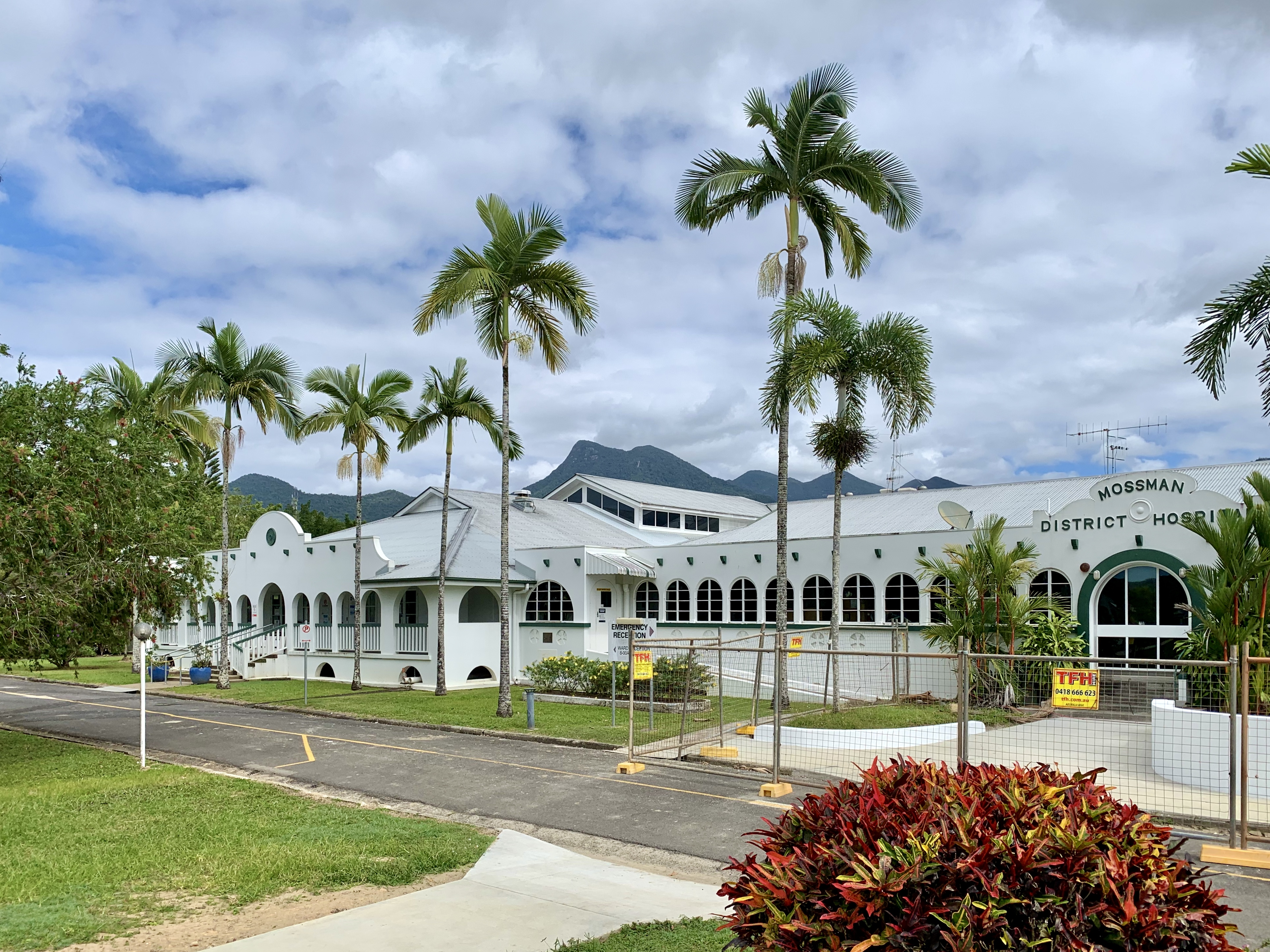
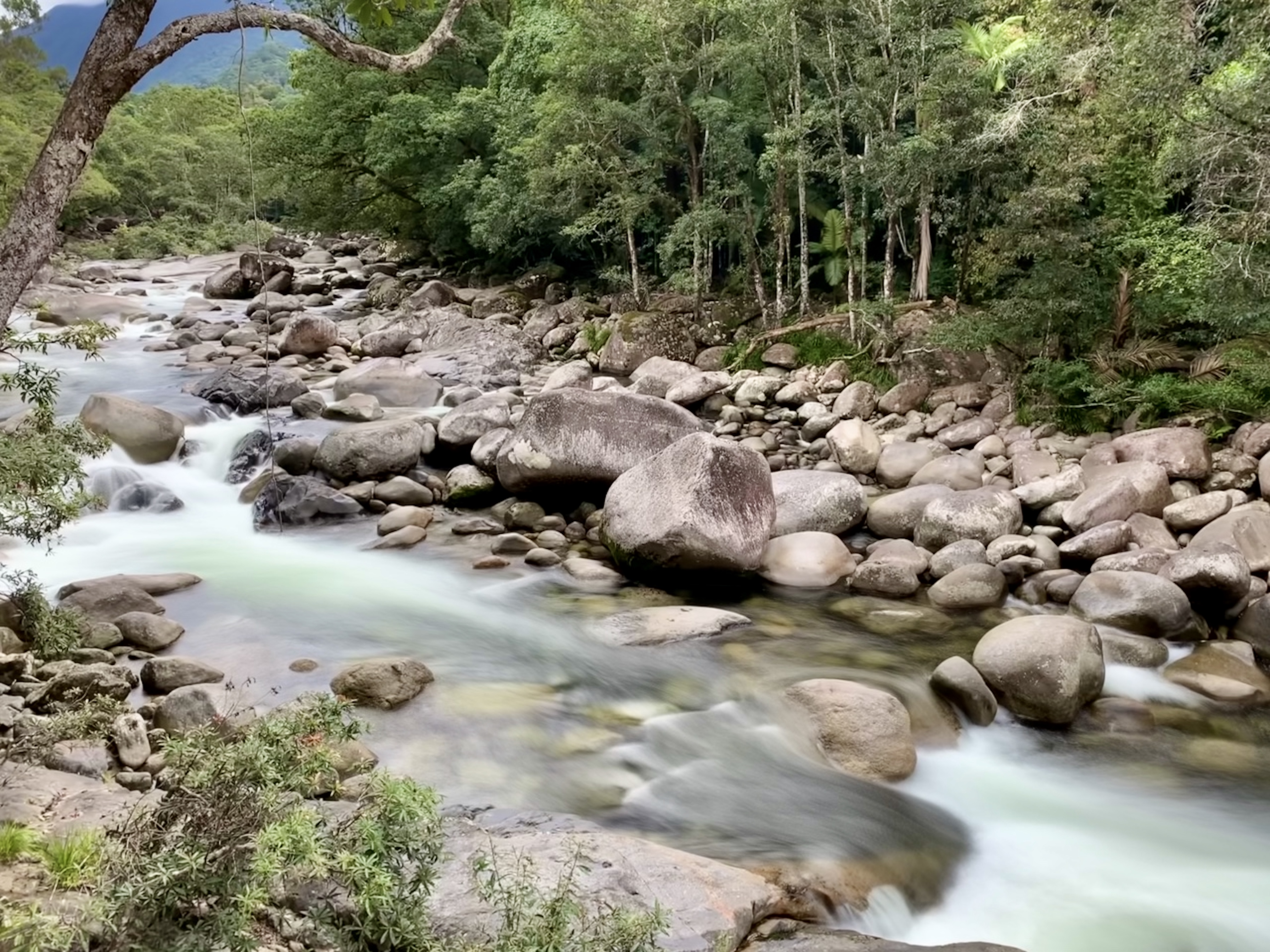
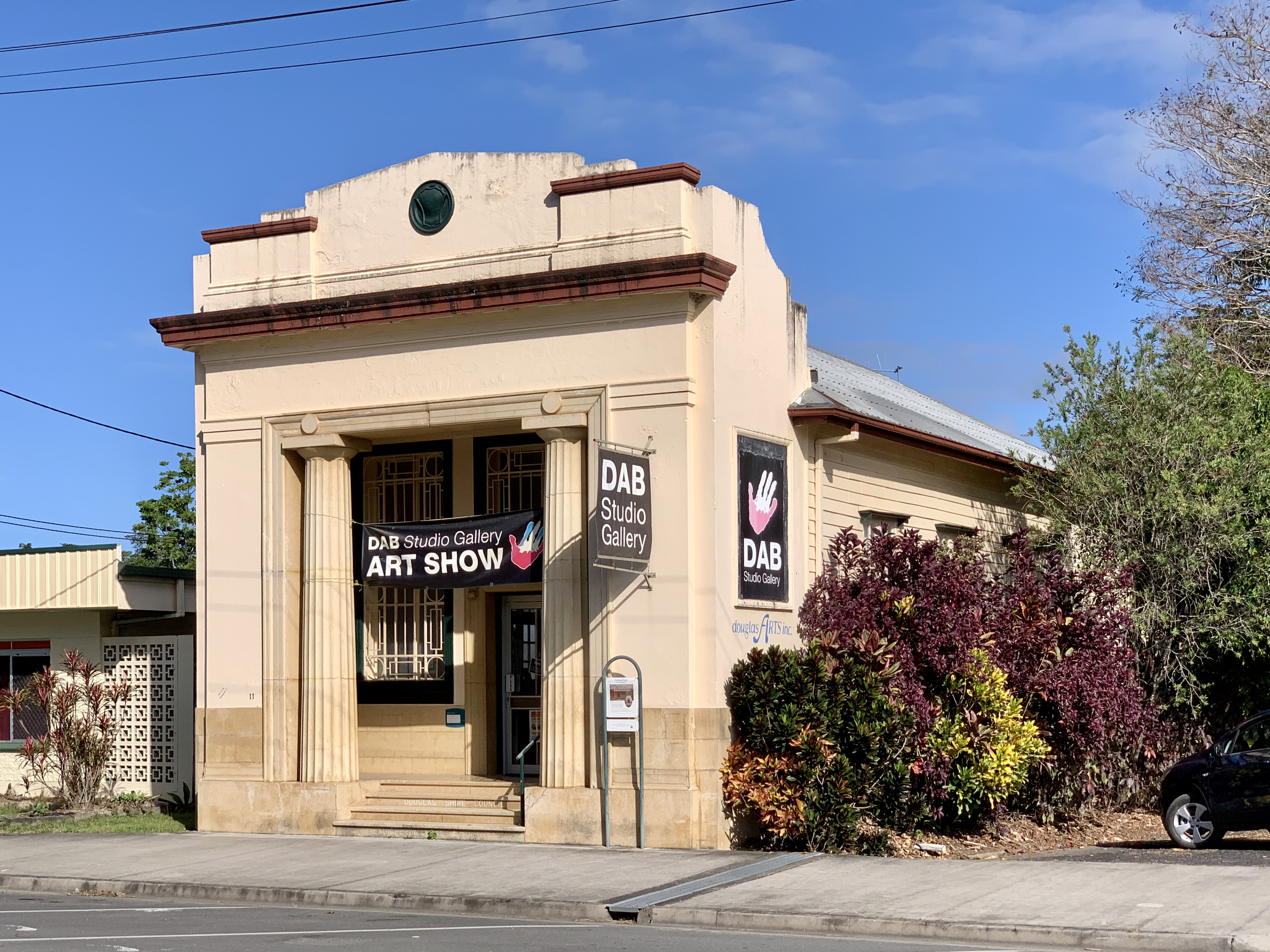
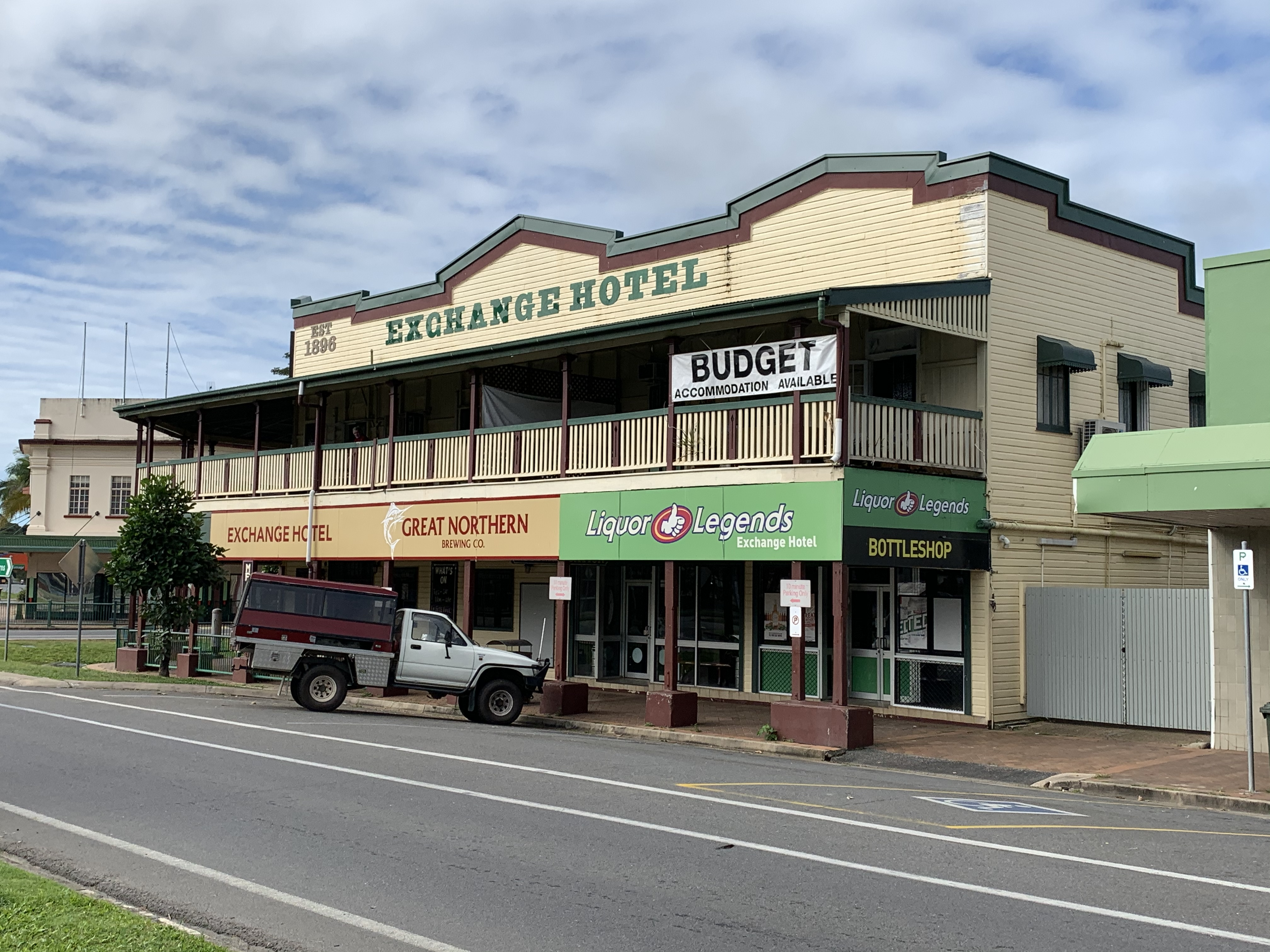
- From left to right; Mossman District Hospital, Mossman Gorge; National Bank of Australia, Exchange Hotel

- Interactive map of Mossman
- Coordinates: 16.4604°S 145.3736°E
- Country: Australia
- State: Queensland
- LGA: Shire of Douglas
- Location: 258.9 km (160.9 mi) S of Cooktown; 20.6 km (12.8 mi) NW of Port Douglas; 76.0 km (47.2 mi) NW of Cairns; 421 km (262 mi) NNW of Townsville; 1,753 km (1,089 mi) NNw of Brisbane

Government
  - State electorate: Cook
  - Federal division: Leichhardt

Area
  - Total: 12.1 km^{2} (4.7 sq mi)
- Elevation: 10 m (33 ft)

Population
  - Total: 1,935 (2021 census)
  - Density: 159.9/km^{2} (414.2/sq mi)
- Time zone: UTC+10:00 (AEST)
- Postcode: 4873
- County: Solander
- Mean max temp: 27.9 °C (82.2 °F)
- Mean min temp: 20.6 °C (69.1 °F)
- Annual rainfall: 2,013.2 mm (79.26 in)
Localities around Mossman
Syndicate	Miallo	Newell
Finlayvale	Mossman	Bonnie Doon
Mossman Gorge	Shannonvale	Shannonvale

Mossman is a rural town and locality in the Shire of Douglas, Queensland, Australia. It is the administrative centre for the Douglas Shire Council In the 2021 census, the locality of Mossman had a population of 1,935 people.

== Geography ==
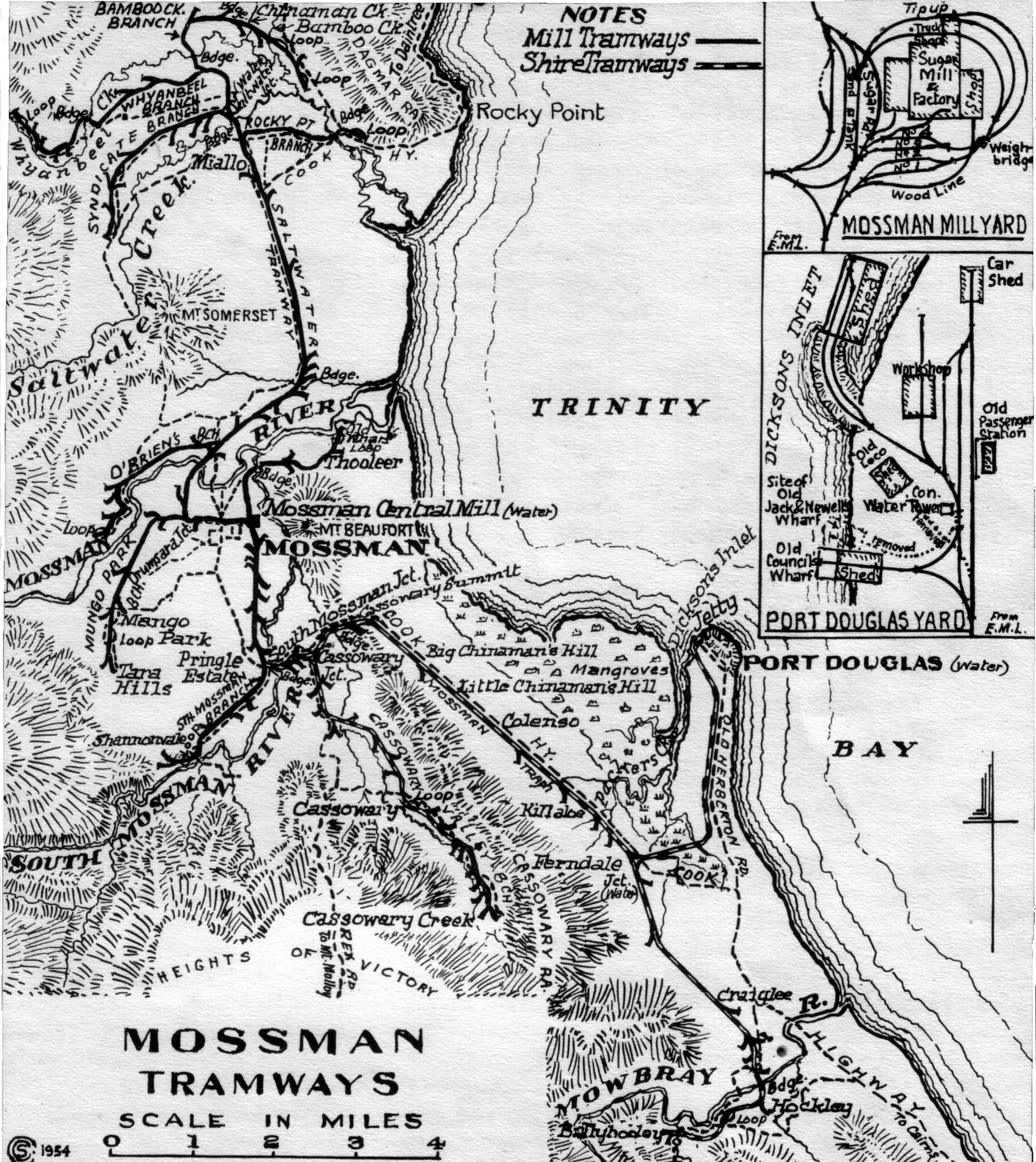
Mosman Trams

Mossman in Far North Queensland on the Mossman River.

Mossman is located on the Captain Cook Highway 75 kilometres (47 mi) north of the regional city of Cairns, and 15 kilometres (9.3 mi) east of the Mount Carbine Tableland. The Mossman River flows through the locality from west (Finlayvale / Mossman Gorge) to east (Newell / Bonnie Doon).

Mossman Gorge, a popular attraction within Daintree National Park and the broader Wet Tropics of Queensland World Heritage area is located west of town.

Sugar cane farming is an important aspect of the local economy, with Mossman Central Mill, the only sugar mill in the district, processing the cane before sending it to Cairns for shipping domestically and internationally. There is a network of cane tramways through Mossman and nearby sugarcane growing areas to deliver the harvested sugarcane to the mill.

== History ==
=== Local Aboriginal history ===
The traditional language area of Kuka-Dyangan (also known as Djangun, Gugu Djangun and Kuka Djangun) includes landscape within the local government boundaries of the Douglas Shire and Cook Shire.

Kuku Yalanji (also known as Gugu Yalanji, Kuku Yalaja, and Kuku Yelandji) is an Australian Aboriginal language of the Mossman and Daintree areas of North Queensland. The language region includes areas within the local government area of Shire of Douglas and Shire of Cook, particularly the localities of Mossman, Daintree, Bloomfield River, China Camp, Maytown, Palmer, Cape Tribulation and Wujal Wujal.

Yalanji (also known as Kuku Yalanji, Kuku Yalaja, Kuku Yelandji, and Gugu Yalanji) is an Australian Aboriginal language of Far North Queensland. The traditional language region is Mossman River in the south to the Annan River in the north, bordered by the Pacific Ocean in the east and extending inland to west of Mount Mulgrave. This includes the local government boundaries of the Shire of Douglas, the Shire of Cook and the Aboriginal Shire of Wujal Wujal and the towns and localities of Cooktown, Mossman, Daintree, Cape Tribulation and Wujal Wujal. It includes the head of the Palmer River, the Bloomfield River, China Camp, Maytown, and Palmerville.

=== Establishment of Mossman ===
The district was originally known as Mossman River after the river which flows through it. The Mossman River, in turn, was named by the explorer George Dalrymple on 6 December 1873 after Hugh Mosman who discovered gold in Charters Towers. Dalrymple wrote "I named this river the Mossman River, after Mossman, an explorer and mining man, member of a very prominent mining family". The town was also known for a brief time as Hartsville after Daniel Hart, an early settler. Later the name was changed to Mossman.

Mossman River Post Office opened by 1895 (a receiving office had been open from 1883) and was renamed Mossman in 1899.

Mossman Central Sugar Mill commenced crushing on 23 August 1897.

The Mossman – Port Douglas parish of the Roman Catholic Vicariate Apostolic of Queensland (now the Roman Catholic Diocese of Cairns) was established in 1877.

Mossman River State School opened on 31 January 1898 under head teacher Thomas Garland. It was renamed Mossman State School in 1910.

=== Growth period ===
The establishment and subsequent growth of Cairns and the completion of the Cairns Railway up through the Barron Gorge in 1891 gave a more direct gateway to the hinterland but, at this period, it was found that the Mossman district contained suitable land for sugar-growing. The establishment of the sugar mill at Mossman formed the nucleus of the town, which grew at the expense of Port Douglas.

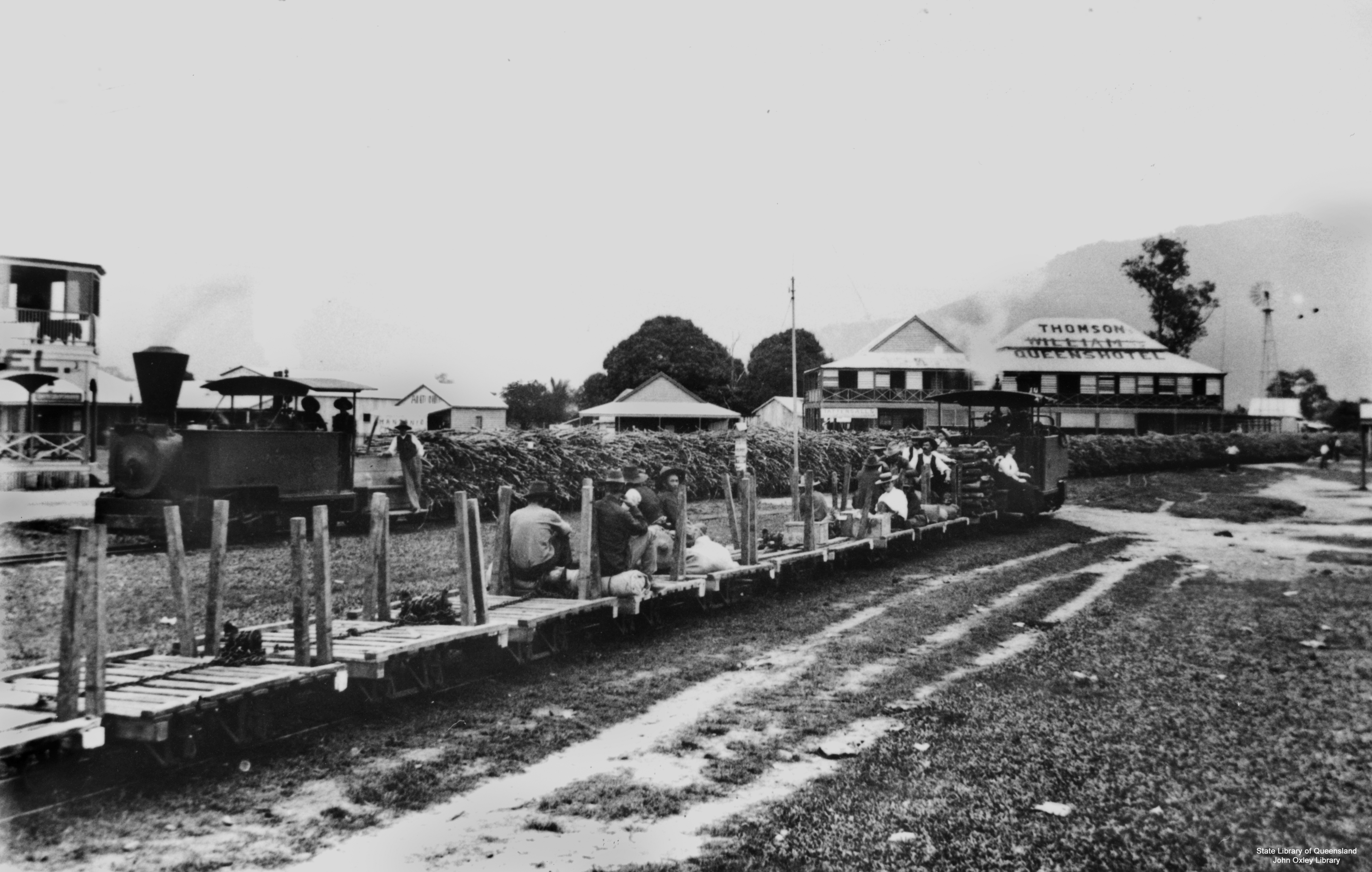
Sugar cane tram travelling through Mossman, Queensland, 1900

The district was served by two separate 2-foot (610 mm) gauge tramway systems. Both at one time handled passengers, general goods, as well as sugar cane. Mossman district owes its present prosperity to these tramways which pioneered the first reasonable transport in the neighbourhood, for trafficable roads followed later.

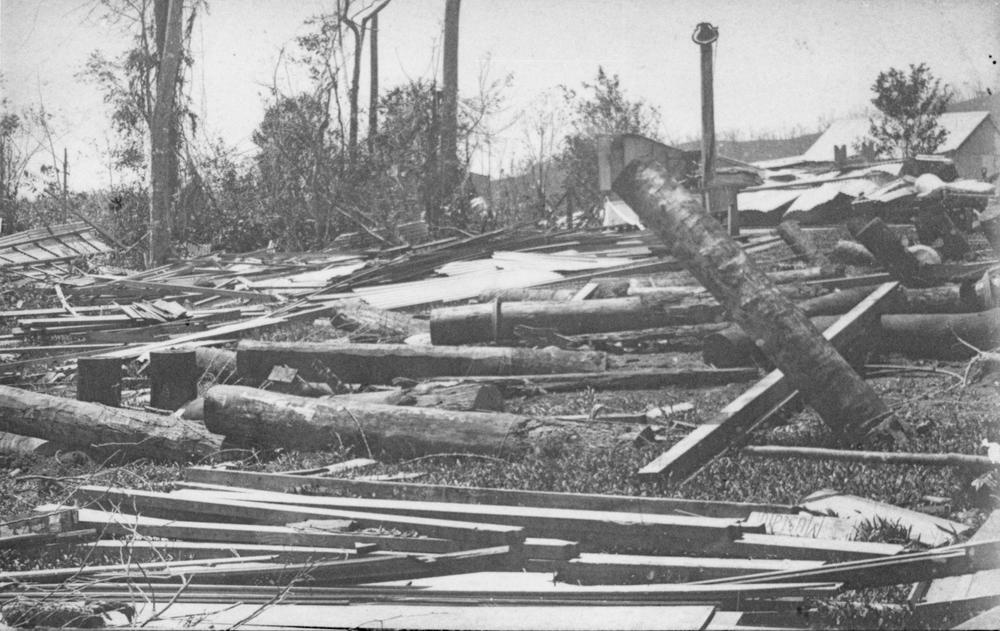
Remains of the 1906 Catholic church after the 1911 cyclone

In June 1905, tenders were called to erect a Catholic church in Mossman. On Sunday 21 January 1906, St Augustine's Catholic church was consecrated by Bishop James Murray in the presence of several hundred spectators.

On Thursday 16 March 1911, a cyclone hit Mossman and Port Douglas doing considerable damage. In Mossman, over 80 people were homeless and the Catholic and Anglican churches were destroyed. On Sunday 11 February 1912, a new St Augustine's Catholic Church was opened by Bishop Murray on Junction Road. Following the cyclone, many Port Douglas residents chose not to rebuild and instead relocated to the more prosperous Mossman.

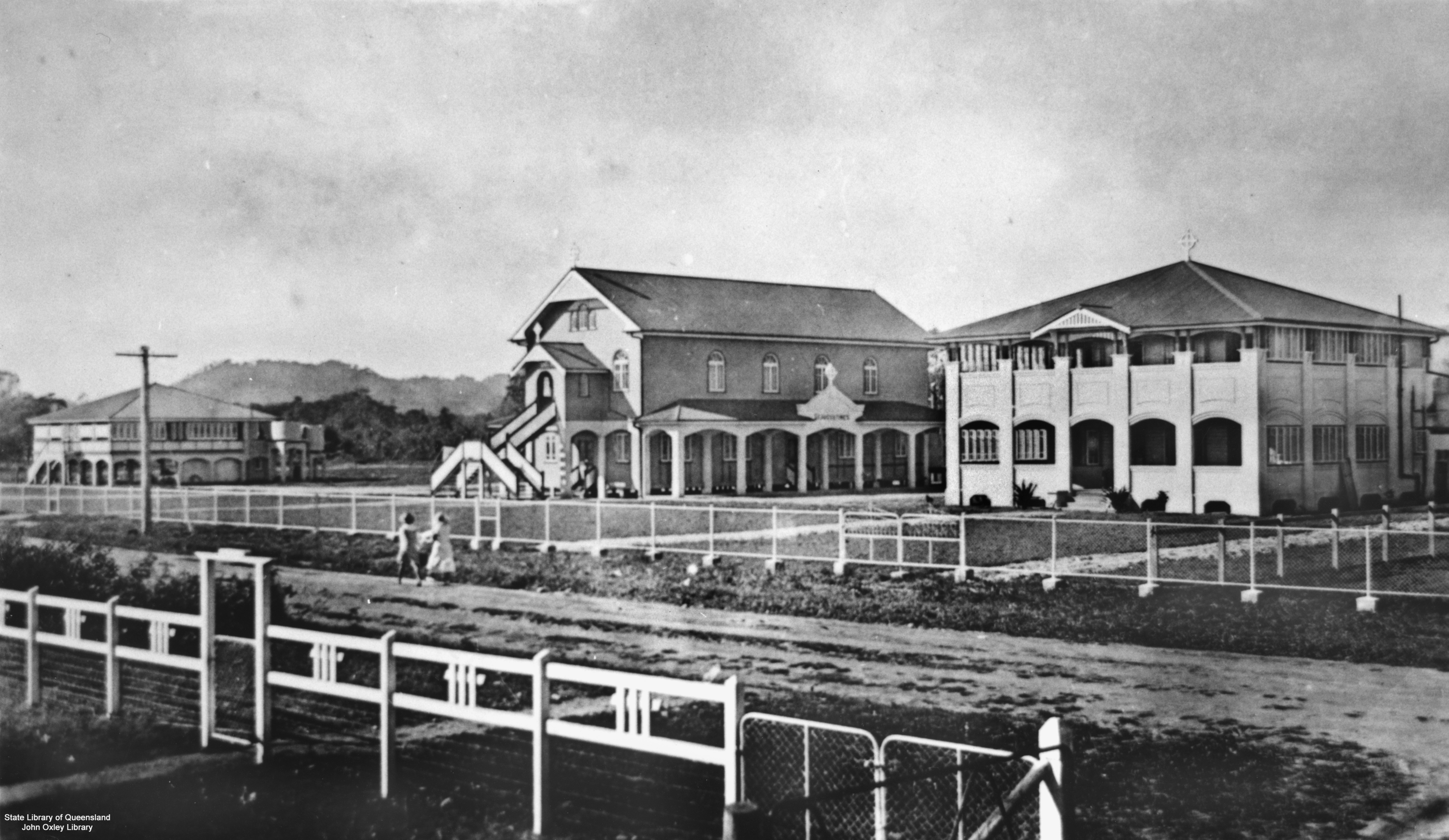
The 1934 St Augustine's combined Catholic church and school building (centre) and the Sisters of Mercy convent (right). The school now occupies both buildings as the convent has closed and a new church has been built.

=== Consolidation as administrative centre ===
During the interwar period, Mossman consolidated its position as the district's administrative and commercial centre. An influx of migrant workers from Italy, Yugoslavia and Malta substantially increased sugar production, and by the mid-1920s pressure grew to formally shift the seat of government to Mossman.

Throughout the 1930s Mossman cemented its status as the region's premier town. The opening of Captain Cook Highway in 1933, constructed as part of the Forgan SmithGovernment's Unemployment Relief Scheme, led to the closure of the portion of the region's tramways connecting Mossman and Port Douglas. The 1930s also brought significant public investment under Douglas Shire Council Chairman R.D. Rex, including the construction of a new Shire Hall, a hospital, and the National Bank of Australasia.

As the population of Mossman grew, there was a desire to build a Catholic school, but the Junction Road site did not have the space, so a new site was purchased in Grogan Street. On Sunday 29 April 1934, Bishop John Heavey officially opened the new St Augustine's complex at Grogan Street, consisting of a presbytery, a combined church and school building, and a convent. The architect was Vibert McKirdy Brown. St Augustine's Catholic School opened with 70 students, with the initial teachers being Sisters Mary Agnes, Gabriel, Cecelia and Pius of the Sisters of Mercy.

=== World War II ===
World War II had a major impact on FNQ, and military use of facilities was commonplace across the region. The Mossman Shire Hall hosted regular dances, and the picture theatre was used to broadcast newsreels. Construction of the Rex Highway was commenced by the US 2/15 Engineers, and a number of migrant workers in the sugar cane industry were interred for the duration of the war.

On 31 July 1942, Mossman was attacked in a Japanese air raid. A single flying boat dropped a bomb that fell near a house and injured a child, resulting in only civilian casualty in Australia during the war.

=== Post-war period ===
On 30 January 1977, a new hexagonal-shaped St Augustine's church opened on the Grogan Street site with the former church being converted into school classrooms.

A secondary department was opened within the existing Mossman State School on 1 February 1955, which operated until a separate Mossman State High School opened on 30 January 1973.

Mossman Library opened in 1977.

=== Amalgamation and de-amalgamation ===
Prior to 2008, Mossman was the seat of the Shire of Douglas. In 2008, the Shire of Douglas was amalgamated into the Cairns Region, which was administered from both Cairns and Mossman. In 2014, the Shire of Douglas was de-amalgamated from Cairns Region and reinstated as Shire of Douglas.

== Demographics ==
In the 2006 census, the town of Mossman had a population of 1,740 people.

In the 2016 census, the locality of Mossman had a population of 1,937 people.

In the 2021 census, the locality of Mossman had a population of 1,935 people.

== Heritage listings ==
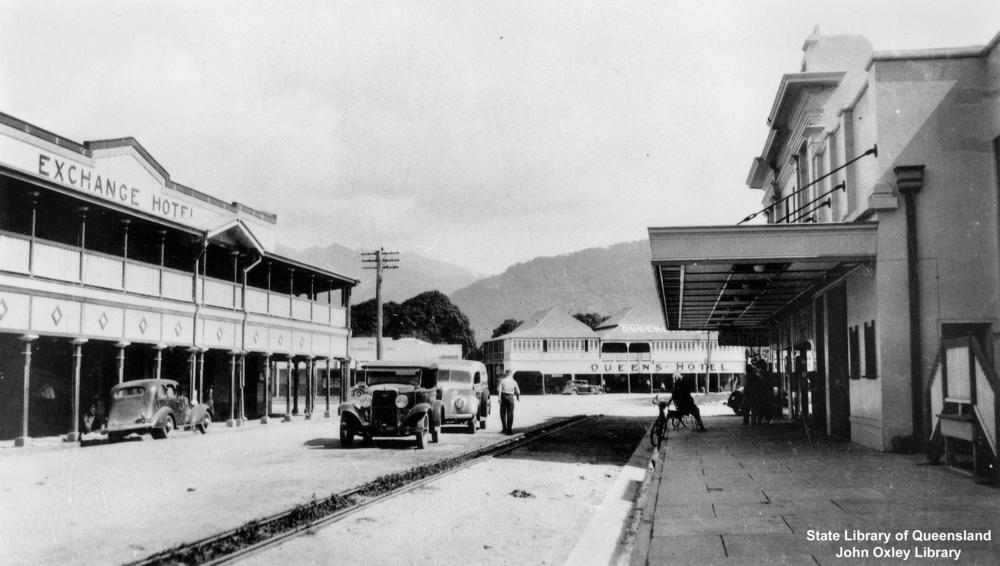
The heritage protected Exchange Hotel (left) in 1940

Mossman has a number of heritage-listed sites, including:

- Exchange Hotel (formerly Daintree Inn), 2 Front Street
- St David's Anglican Church, 3 Foxton Avenue
- Mossman District Hospital, Johnston Road
- Mossman Shire Hall and Douglas Shire Council Chambers, 8–14 Mill Street:
- National Bank of Australasia Building, 11 Mill Street

== Mossman Central Mill ==
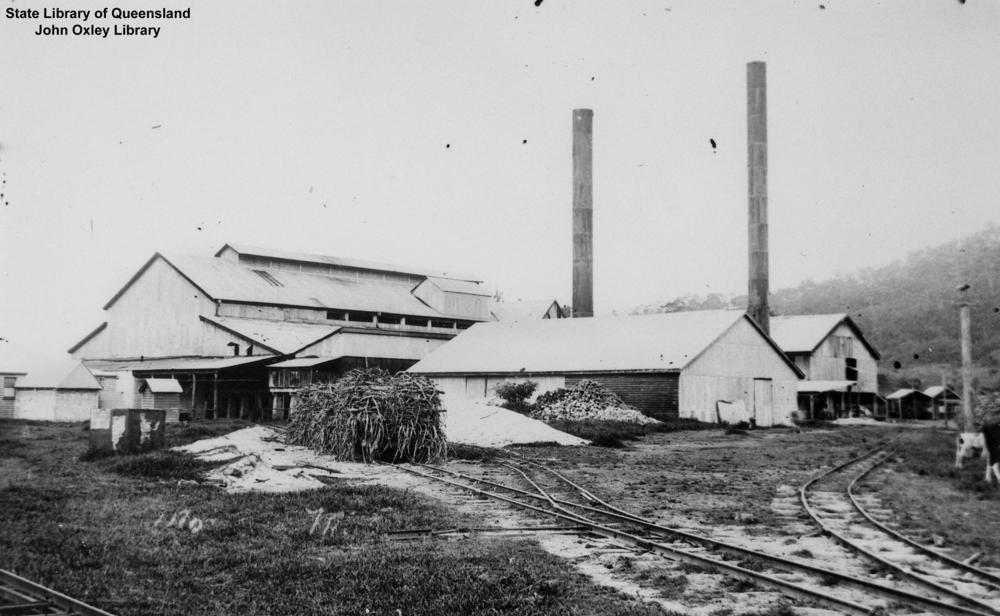
Mossman Central Mill, 1920s

Mossman Central Mill Company Limited opened in 1894 as co-operative sugar mill owned by local sugarcane farmers. The Sugar Works Guarantee Act (Queensland) of 1893 enabled groups of landowners to borrow government funds to establish central sugar mills, and farmers in the Mossman district successfully secured the £35,000 required for the mill's construction.

The first sugarcane was crushed on 23 August 1897, the sugarcane coming from Bonnie Doon. Annie Rose fed the first sugarcane into the mill, with the mill producing its first sugar after crushing 27,905 tonnes (30,760 tons) of cane for the initial season.

In 1906, Mossman Mill became the first Queensland mill to crush over 100,000 tonnes (98,000 long tons; 110,000 short tons) of cane. That season lasted just under 8 months, extending from June 1906 to late January 1907.

Initially, sugar was transported by sea from Port Douglas, but later the sugar was taken by road to the bulk sugar terminal in Cairns.

Louis John Frederick Prince (General Manager) pioneered the use of computers for cane payment accounting and, in 1971, Mossman purchased the first process control computer used in the world sugar industry.

The Tropical North Steiner School opened in January 2022, offering Prep to Year 3 initially. In January 2023, the school surrendered its accreditation, effective October 2022.

The mill closed in 2024. Local sugarcane farmers must now send their sugarcane to the Mulgrave Sugar Mill, over 100 kilometres (62 mi) away, costing an extra $30 per tonne in transport, which means the expected 310,000 tonnes of cane will cost more than $9 million extra in transport. Farmers are seeking a subsidy from the Queensland Government to assist with this extra cost.

== Education ==
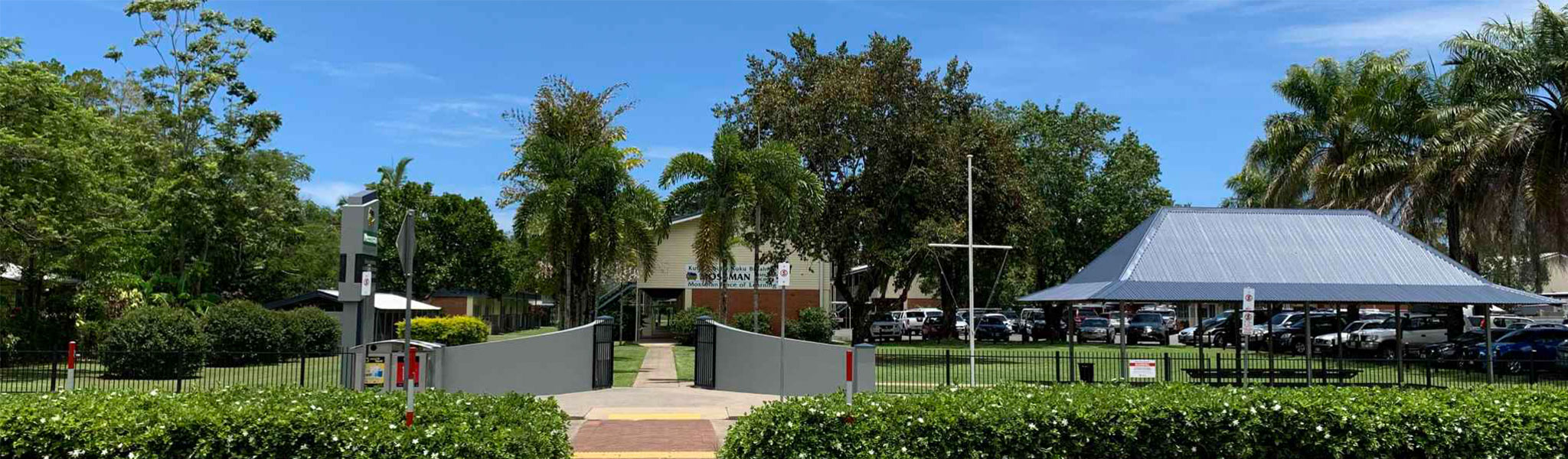
Mossman State High School, 2024

Mossman State School is a government primary (Prep–6) school for boys and girls at 30–34 Front Street (16.4617°S 145.3743°E). In 2017, the school had an enrolment of 213 students with 16 teachers (13 full-time equivalent) and 22 non-teaching staff (13 full-time equivalent).

Mossman State High School is a government secondary (7–12) school for boys and girls at 46–62 Front Street (16.4634°S 145.3735°E). In 2017, the school had an enrolment of 611 students with 62 teachers (56 full-time equivalent) and 41 non-teaching staff (31 full-time equivalent). It includes a special education program.

St Augustine's School is a Catholic primary (Prep–6) school for boys and girls at Grogan Street (16.4617°S 145.3688°E). In 2017, the school had an enrolment of 217 students with 16 teachers (14 full-time equivalent) and 13 non-teaching staff (6 full-time equivalent).

== Amenities ==
Douglas Shire Council operates Mossman Library at 14 Mill Street (16.4589°S 145.3750°E).

The Mossman branch of the Queensland Country Women's Association meets at 28 Front Street (16.4614°S 145.3738°E).

There are a number of churches in Mossman, including:

- St Augustine's Catholic Church, at 24B Grogan Street (16.4620°S 145.3695°E), within the Mossman-Port Douglas Parish of the Roman Catholic Diocese of Cairns
- St David's Anglican Church, 3 Foxton Avenue (16.4578°S 145.3732°E), within the Anglican Diocese of North Queensland
- Mossman Uniting Church, 36 Front Street (16.4623°S 145.3738°E)
- Mossman Seventh-Day Adventist Church, 60 Captain Cook Highway (16.4745°S 145.3751°E)

== Facilities ==
Mossman Hospital is a public hospital at 9 Hospital Street (16.4639°S 145.3682°E). It has an accident and emergency services, clinics, and an in-patient pharmacy.

== Sport ==
Mossman has a number of sporting clubs including the Coral Coast Judo Club.

== See also ==
- List of sugar mills in Queensland
- List of tramways in Queensland
