= National Bank of Australasia Building, Mossman =

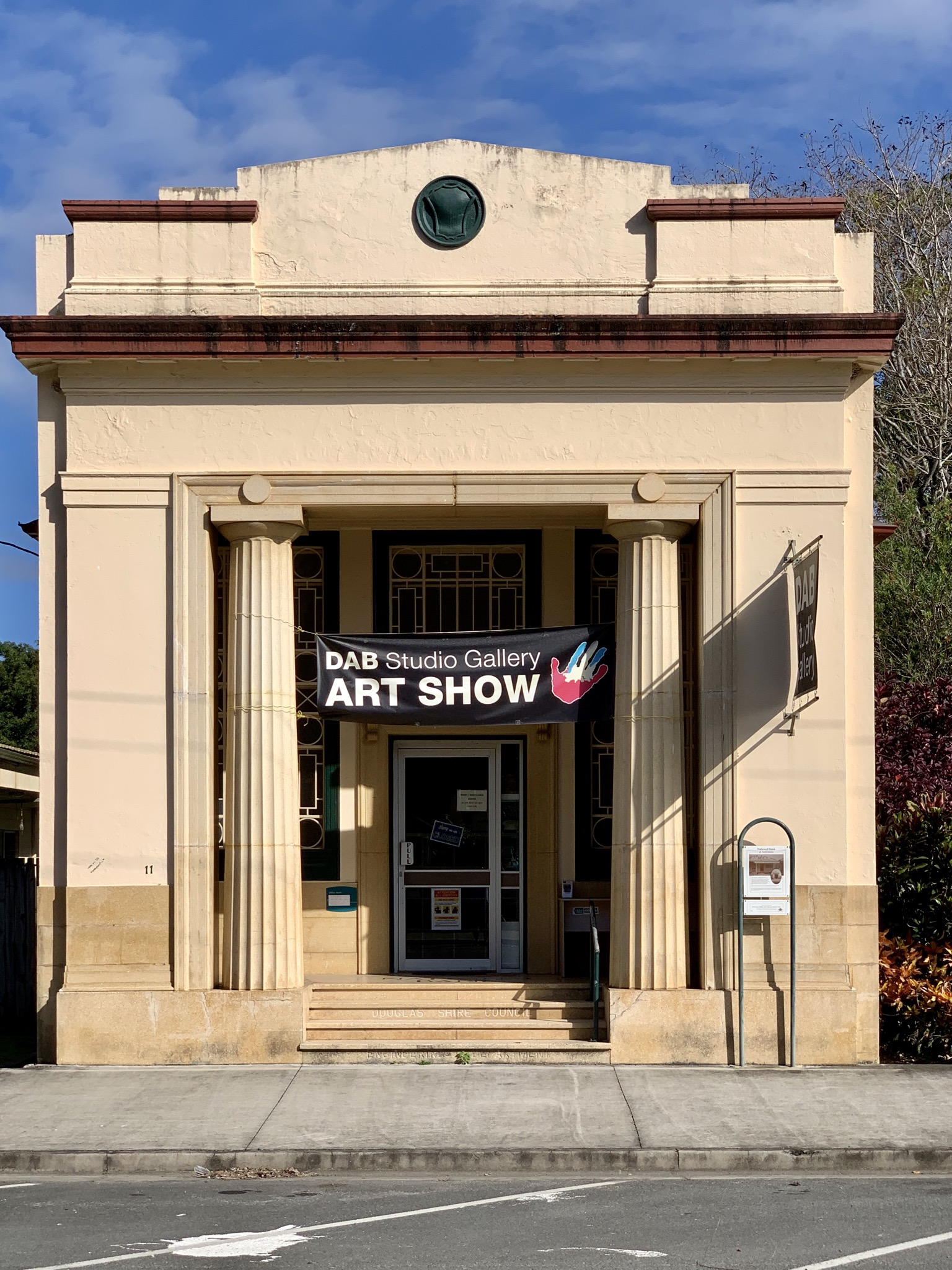
- National Bank of Australasia Building, 2020

- Location within Queensland Location within Australia
- 16.4593°S 145.3749°E
- Location: 11 Mill Street, Mossman, Shire of Douglas, Queensland, Australia

History
- Design period: 1919–1930s (interwar period)
- Built: 1935–1936

Site notes
- Architect: Lange Leopold Powell
- Architectural style: Classicism

Queensland Heritage Register
- Official name: National Bank of Australasia Building (former)
- Type: state heritage (built)
- Designated: 6 August 2010
- Reference no.: 601542
- Significant period: 1935 onwards
- Builders: Arthur E Zillfleisch and Tom Booth

National Bank of Australasia Building is a heritage-listed former bank at 11 Mill Street, Mossman, Shire of Douglas, Queensland, Australia. It was designed by Lange Leopold Powell and built from 1935 to 1936 by Arthur E Zillfleisch and Tom Booth. It was added to the Queensland Heritage Register on 6 August 2010.

== History ==
The former National Bank of Australasia at Mossman is a single storey masonry and timber building designed by notable Queensland architect, Lange Leopold Powell (1884–1938). Constructed from 1935 to 1936, this prominent building illustrates the economic growth experienced by regional towns in Queensland sugar producing districts during the 1920s and 1930s.

Mossman lies inland from Port Douglas, on the flood-plain of the Mossman River between the Great Dividing Range and the coast, about 70 kilometres (43 mi) north of Cairns. George Elphinstone Dalrymple's North-East Coast Exploring Expedition of late 1873 brought attention to the resources around the Johnstone, Mulgrave, Russell, Daintree and Mossman rivers and from 1874 cedar stands on the latter were being logged extensively. Behind the coastal river plain the Hodgkinson goldfield was proclaimed on 15 June 1876. Initially accessed via Cairns, in 1877 a new route between the coast and the goldfields was found and Port Douglas was established as the new service port about four miles south of the mouth of the Mossman River. With the construction of the Cairns–Kuranda railway line between 1882 and 1891, however, the importance of Port Douglas as a town and port declined, while the town of Mossman emerged in the early twentieth century as the administrative centre of a thriving sugar-growing district.

By 1878 the most readily accessible cedar stands in the Mossman River district had been exhausted, although logging in more difficult to reach areas continued into the 1880s. Agricultural settlers followed the timber getters from the late 1870s. Initially they supplied fodder, maize, rice and tropical fruits to the goldfields. Excessive rain and poor soil productivity, however, resulted in much of this land being converted to sugar-growing, with Brie Brie Sugar Plantation and mill being established in Mossman in 1883 (although the mill soon became inoperative). The impetus for more extensive sugar cropping in the district came with the establishment of the Mossman Central Co-operative Mill in the mid-1890s under the provisions of the 1893 Sugar Works Guarantee Act.

The township of Mossman was created from private subdivisions made in 1885 and following the establishment of the Mossman Central Mill. Despite the rapid expansion of sugar growing in the district from the mid-1890s, in 1910 the township of Mossman comprised little more than the Exchange Hotel, a store, butcher's shop, hall and timber church, clustered along Mill Street leading to the sugar mill. These buildings and most of nearby Port Douglas were severely damaged by a cyclone on 16 March 1911. In the aftermath, and with the continued rise in transient and permanent workers in the sugar industry, businesses at Port Douglas gradually gravitated to Mossman. In the 1920s the Court House and banking facilities moved from Port Douglas to Mossman, and by the end of the decade many of the district's services, including the Post Office, were located in Mill Street. In the 1930s town activity was further increased with the opening of a new hospital in 1930, the completion of the Cook Highway between Cairns and Mossman in 1933, and the opening of the new Shire Hall and Offices in 1937. Mossman was now the administrative centre of the shire. During this period of exceptional growth in north Queensland's sugar towns, the National Bank of Australasia Ltd built its branch in Mill Street, Mossman.

The National Bank of Australasia began business in Melbourne in 1858. The bank expanded into rural and regional Victoria, South Australia and later into Western Australia. Branches were opened in New South Wales and Tasmania in the mid-1880s. The bank was restructured in 1893 after the economic crisis of the early 1890s and it became a public listed company as the National Bank of Australasia Limited (NBA).

In 1920 the NBA opened a branch in Brisbane – its first in Queensland. In 1922 the NBA absorbed the Bank of Queensland, which had been formed in 1917 following the merger of the Royal Bank of Queensland (formed in 1886) and the Bank of North Queensland (established in 1888), providing the NBA with branches throughout Queensland.

The NBA's principal competition in Mossman was the Queensland National Bank (QNB), established in Brisbane in 1872. From 1895 the Port Douglas branch of the QNB had served as the bank to the Mossman Central Mill Company and on 28 December 1900 a QNB agency opened in Mossman. In the 1920s a Mossman branch of the QNB, with attached residence, was constructed in Mill Street. This building survives, but has been altered.

The NBA first opened a branch in Mossman on 28 June 1929 in premises rented from the Exchange Hotel. Banks often rented premises prior to committing themselves to a region to test its viability. The bank's decision to acquire land in Mill Street in 1934 is a strong indication that the Mossman district, buoyed by the expansion of the sugar industry, was economically stable during this period. On 21 March 1935 builders Arthur E Zillfleisch and Tom Booth signed a contract for the construction of purpose-built banking premises, which were completed in 1936 for the contract price of £320/5/3.

The new building was designed by Brisbane-based architect Lange Leopold Powell, who undertook a variety of commissions for the NBA between 1922 and 1938. Powell was articled to architects Addison and Corrie from 1900 to 1905, and later worked as a draftsman in the Queensland Public Works Department. In 1908 he went to London, returning to Brisbane in 1911. From this time until his death in October 1938, Powell worked in private practice either on his own or in partnerships with other architects. He designed, remodelled or altered 26 other branch buildings for the NBA; was involved in the design for the NBA's Brisbane headquarters; and designed business premises for the Commercial Bank of Australia Ltd. Apart from his work in Mossman, his work on NBA buildings in regional Queensland included the branches in Ayr (which has a grand, classically styled front facade), Bundaberg, Innisfail, Cairns, Wynnum, Mareeba, Tully, Atherton.

Powell designed other notable buildings in Brisbane that are entered in the Queensland Heritage Register, including: St Martin's War Memorial Hospital (1922, now St Martin's House), Ballow Chambers (1924 and 1926) and the Brisbane Masonic Temple (1930). In addition to this portfolio of work, Powell was a key figure in the development of the Royal Australian Institute of Architects, co-drafting the constitution in 1930 and serving as the institute's fourth president between 1932 and 1933. The architectural firm he started continues today as Powell, Dods and Thorpe Architects, with offices in Brisbane and Townsville.

One of the most distinctive qualities of the building was the impressive temple-like street facade. The use of classically derived stylistic elements was a recurring theme in banking architecture in Queensland, and Australia generally, from the nineteenth century well into the middle of the twentieth century and was very popular during the 1920s and 1930s. Imposing, well-balanced designs symbolised all that banking institutions hoped to convey about the reliability and dependability of their businesses.

Mill Street was still unsealed when the bank was built in the middle of the decade. However, by the end of the decade, the Douglas Shire Council Offices as well as the Town Hall, Post Office, School of Arts, Queensland National Bank, Post Office Hotel, Jack and Newell's General Store, Exchange Hotel and the National Bank of Australasia all occupied a place on Mill Street and were part of a regional commercial precinct.

From 1943 to 1948 the Mossman branch of the NBA closed its business due to the war time rationalisation of manpower. During this period the building was used as a residence. In 1948 the NBA absorbed the QNB, closing the former QNB branch at Mossman.

In 1981 the National Bank of Australasia Limited merged with The Commercial Banking Company of Sydney Limited to form the National Commercial Banking Corporation of Australia Limited and subsequently changed its name to National Australia Bank Limited (NAB). On 7 April 1986, the Mossman branch of the NAB moved into new, larger premises in Front Street, which had become the main street of the town, being the thoroughfare from Cairns and Port Douglas in the south through Mossman and north towards the Daintree River. Mill Street, by comparison, became less important as the town's commercial activities were no longer centred solely on the mill.

The former NAB building was purchased by Douglas Shire Council in 1987 to house its Engineering Department. The following year the roof was replaced with profiled metal decking. In 1997 the council, including its Engineering Department, occupied new purpose-built premises in Front Street, and the former bank building was then leased by Centrelink until 2001. It stood vacant until 2002 when it was leased by Douglas Arts Inc., a community arts group. It continues to be used as a community arts centre in 2010.

In June 2008 the entire Douglas Shire, which had been amalgamated into the Cairns Region earlier that year during a statewide local government reform program, was declared an iconic place under the Iconic Queensland Places Act 2008. In the gazetted declaration (No. 52, 20 June 2008) of this iconic place, the built environment values listed as being notable and worthy of preservation include those related to Mossman being the administrative centre of the Shire. Following a referendum in 2013, the Shire of Douglas was re-established on 1 January 2014.

== Description ==
The former National Bank of Australasia at Mossman is one of several historic buildings located in Mill Street, along which a tramline runs linking the Mossman Central Mill to cane farms west of the town. Other buildings along Mill Street include the Mossman Shire Hall and former Douglas Shire Council Building, Jack and Newell's General Store, the former Exchange Hotel and a refurbished picture theatre. The surrounding landscape is generally flat, sloping slightly towards the Mossman River and its tributaries. The distant views from the steps at the front of the bank are to Mount Demi and the Great Dividing Range to the west and to Mount Beaufort to the east.

The former bank building is sited facing north on a long, narrow allotment and is a simple timber-framed building with gabled roof, given a prominent street presence through the use of a masonry facade and portico. The facade is temple-like in its symmetrical composition comprising a number of elements of classical origin including widely spaced Doric columns between plain pilasters supporting a simplified entablature and cornice. The columns and surrounding architrave have a terrazzo finish as does the exterior and portico walls to approximately one metre above ground floor level.

From the street level, four steps finished in terrazzo lead up between the columns to a small portico with the riser of the third step engraved with the words "Douglas Shire Council" in uppercase lettering. The floor to the portico, inlaid with the words "National Bank", and the architrave, corbels and lintel surrounding the main entrance are also finished in terrazzo. The original front door has been replaced with an aluminium framed door with a side light. The tall windows either side of the front door comprise two pairs of six- pane steel framed casement windows vertically aligned and separated by a fixed light between the upper and lower sashes. Above the door, the fixed window has 12 panes and decorative wrought iron grilles are fixed to all windows on this elevation.

Behind the portico, the remainder of the main building is long and narrow, timber-framed and clad in weatherboards with a gabled roof. The northern gable end is hidden behind the facade which forms a parapet and the southern end of the roof is hipped. The roof of the main building is clad with ribbed-profile metal sheeting and the low pitched skillion roofs to the rear additions are clad in corrugated metal sheeting.

On the eastern elevation are four tall hooded windows each comprising two pairs of vertically aligned, six-pane timber framed casements. The west elevation is similar except the bottom pair of casements of the southernmost window have been replaced by a door which is accessed by a ramp.

Beyond the portico is the banking chamber, a large room approximately 11 metres (36 ft) long and seven metres wide with four-metre-high (13 ft) ceilings. It occupies the entire enclosed space of the building for most of its length. The walls are lined with vertically jointed pine boards and there is a profiled picture rail in line with the head of the windows. Ceilings are of plaster with cornices and decorative ceiling roses that remain. Skirtings, architraves and cornices in the chamber have multiple stepped profiles. To the rear of the chamber a full height wall of perforated fibreboard, is a later addition, built in line with the front of the strong room, which remains with its original door in place. While the walls and ceiling of the banking chamber are relatively intact, the fittings belonging to the bank have been otherwise removed and the floor covered with carpet. The original lighting has been replaced by hanging fluorescent fittings.

There are two weatherboard-clad additions built against the southern wall of the main bank building. A passageway leads past the strong room to these additions, which include toilets and a kitchen and are not considered to be of cultural heritage significance. The toilets are accessed by doors in the southern wall. Adjacent to this is the kitchen which appears to have been constructed after the toilets.

There is a garden bed along the western side of the allotment and behind the building is a long garage building clad in steel sheeting. This is recently built and is not of cultural heritage significance.

== Heritage listing ==
The former National Bank of Australasia Building was listed on the Queensland Heritage Register on 6 August 2010 having satisfied the following criteria.

The place is important in demonstrating the evolution or pattern of Queensland's history.

The former National Bank of Australasia building at Mossman was constructed in 1935–1936 and makes an important contribution to our understanding of the era of prosperity experienced by many north Queensland towns during the expansion of the sugar industry in the 1920s and 1930s. It is a small but prominent building in the main commercial precinct of Mossman, with a facade designed to impress and reassure patrons of the banking institution's financial stability and probity. The building was constructed at a time when Mossman was emerging as the administrative heart of the Douglas Shire, a successful sugar-growing and -milling district of Queensland. Mossman's identity in this Shire was confirmed in the Iconic Queensland Place of Douglas declaration made in June 2008 regarding the Shire.

The place is important in demonstrating the principal characteristics of a particular class of cultural places.

The former National Bank of Australasia building at Mossman is a small bank building designed for a rural town and the agricultural district it served. Its masonry facade, with a classically styled entrance portico and columns, was intended to project the bank's financial standing and it masks a plainer weatherboard-clad building behind. The building retains its banking chamber, strong room and original windows, and has been little altered. The Queensland Heritage Register lists it as a significant for demonstrating the principal characteristics of a small rural bank.

The building also contributes to our understanding of the work of architect Lange Leopold Powell, who made a significant contribution to Queensland's built environment and was a key figure in the development of the Royal Australian Institute of Architects. Powell designed or modified numerous buildings for the National Bank of Australasia in Queensland, of which this is an example of those he completed in regional towns, characteristically with a classically influenced street facade on an otherwise simple building. He also designed many other buildings, such as the Brisbane Masonic Temple.

The place is important because of its aesthetic significance.

The former National Bank of Australasia building at Mossman is of aesthetic significance for the valuable and prominent contribution it makes – through scale, form, materials and design – to the distinctive visual character of the town. This is characterised by a patterning of spaces and buildings comprising one to two storeys, built to the footpath with a formal street facade in contrast to a simpler structure behind. The impressive, classically designed facade of this building is of particular aesthetic merit. The use of classical architectural elements in the facades of banks and other commercial buildings, town halls and institutional buildings was popular in the 1920s and 1930s and has made a noticeable contribution to Queensland's built environment.
