= Finlayvale, Queensland =

Finlayvale
- Suburb
- Interactive map of Finlayvale
- Coordinates: 16.4602°S 145.3477°E
- Country: Australia
- State: Queensland
- LGA: Shire of Douglas
- Location: 4.5 km (2.8 mi) W of Mossman; 25.5 km (15.8 mi) NW of Port Douglas; 82.7 km (51.4 mi) NNW of Cairns; 1,761 km (1,094 mi) NNW of Brisbane

Government
  - State electorate: Cook
  - Federal division: Leichhardt

Area
  - Total: 4.4 km^{2} (1.7 sq mi)
- Elevation: 10–340 m (33–1,115 ft)

Population
  - Total: 33 (2021 census)
  - Density: 7.50/km^{2} (19.4/sq mi)
- Time zone: UTC+10:00 (AEST)
- Postcode: 4873
Suburbs around Finlayvale
Syndicate	Mossman	Mossman
Syndicate	Finlayvale	Mossman Gorge
Syndicate	Mossman Gorge	Mossman Gorge

Finlayvale is a rural locality in the Shire of Douglas, Queensland, Australia. In the 2021 census, Finlayvale had a population of 33 people.

== Geography ==
The land in most of the locality is low-lying about 10 metres (33 ft) or less, but on the western edge of the locality, the land begins to rise sharply towards the ridge of the Great Dividing Range with the south-west of the locality reaching 430 metres (1,410 ft). The locality is bounded by the Mossman River to the south and east.

Finlayvale Road passes through the locality from the north-east (Mossman) to the south-west (Syndicate). The predominant land use is growing sugarcane. There is a cane tramway network to transport the harvested sugarcane to the Mossman Central Mill.

== History ==
The locality was named after the Finlayvale sugar plantation established by pioneers Denis and Teresa O'Brien. Teresa's maiden name was Finlay.

== Demographics ==
In the 2016 census, Finlayvale had a population of 32 people.

In the 2021 census, Finlayvale had a population of 33 people.

== Education ==
There are no schools in Finlayvale. The nearest primary and secondary schools are Mossman State School and Mossman State High School in Mossman to the east.
