= Syndicate, Queensland =

Syndicate
- Suburb
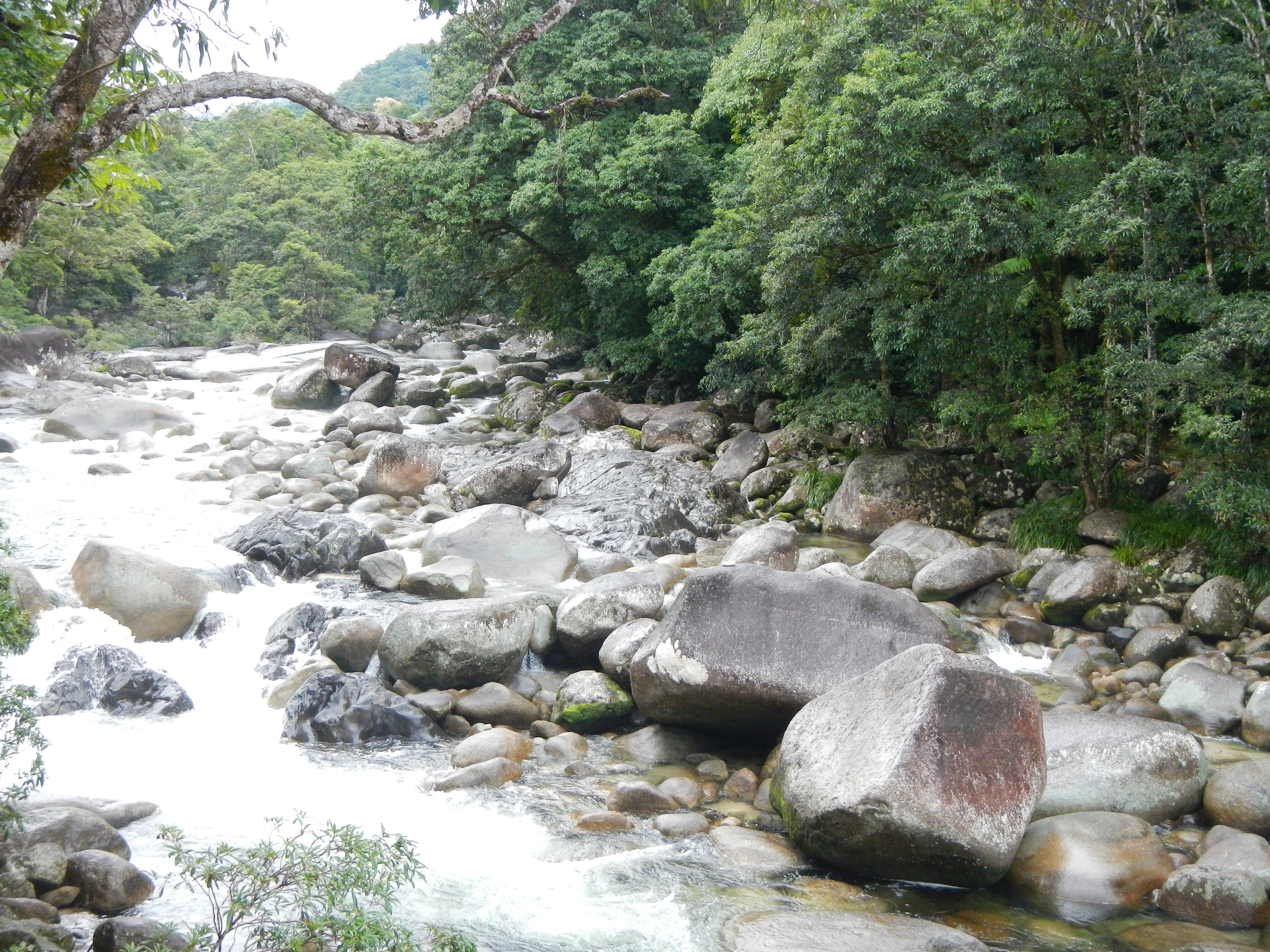
- Mossman River, 2013

- Interactive map of Syndicate
- Coordinates: 16.4252°S 145.2838°E
- Country: Australia
- State: Queensland
- LGA: Shire of Douglas
- Location: 15.7 km (9.8 mi) NW of Mossman; 35.5 km (22.1 mi) NW of Port Douglas; 91.5 km (56.9 mi) NNW of Cairns; 1,783 km (1,108 mi) NNW of Brisbane

Government
  - State electorate: Cook
  - Federal division: Leichhardt

Area
  - Total: 116.5 km^{2} (45.0 sq mi)

Population
  - Total: 0 (2021 census)
  - Density: 0.000/km^{2} (0.000/sq mi)
- Time zone: UTC+10:00 (AEST)
- Postcode: 4873
Suburbs around Syndicate
Dedin	Dedin	Whyanbeel
Mount Carbine	Syndicate	Miallo; Mossman
Mount Carbine	Shannonvale	Finlayvale; Mossman Gorge

Syndicate is a rainforest locality in the Shire of Douglas, Queensland, Australia. In the 2021 census, Syndicate had "no people or a very low population".

== Geography ==
The locality is entirely within the Daintree National Park, part of the world-heritage-listed Wet Tropics of Queensland.

The Mossman River rises in the west of the locality and exits to the south-west (Mossman Gorge / Finlayvale).

The land use is nature conservation.

== Demographics ==
In the 2016 census, Syndicate had "no people or a very low population".

In the 2021 census, Syndicate had "no people or a very low population".

== Education ==
There are no schools in Syndicate. The nearest government primary and secondary schools are Mossman State School and Mossman State High School, both in neighbouring Mossman to the east. There is also a Catholic primary school in Mossman.
