= Vibert McKirdy Brown =

Australian architect (c.1887–1957)

Vibert McKirdy Brown (c. 1887–1957) was an architect who practiced in Far North Queensland, Australia from the 1920s to 1940s. Some of his works are now heritage-listed.

== Early life ==
He was born in South Africa c.1887, but by 1916 was living in north Queensland where he enlisted and served in the army during World War I, listing his pre-war trade as "contractor".

== Architectural career ==
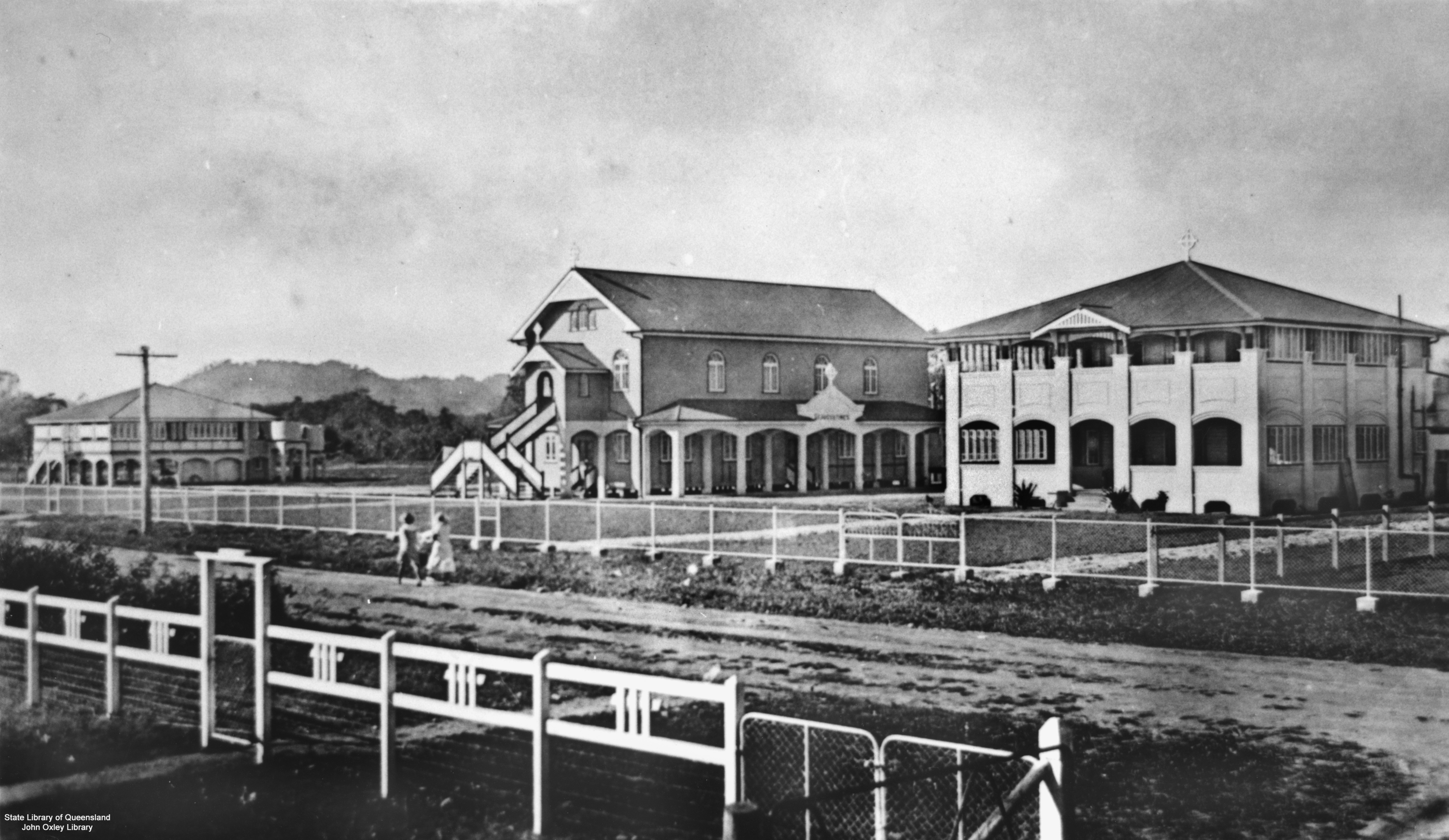
St Augustine's Church-School and Convent, Mossman, built 1934

From 1925 Brown advertised himself as an architect in Atherton and over the next two decades he completed a wide variety of buildings throughout the Cairns and Atherton Tablelands area. Characteristics of Brown's works include art deco and simplified classical style ornamentation, particularly raised banding on facades.

Brown had a long association with the Atherton District Hospital Board, and was responsible for many of the Atherton Hospital buildings constructed in the 1920s and 30s. Brown also designed many buildings for the Catholic Church in the region, including St Augustine's Church School and Convent at Mossman (1934). He also designed several buildings for the Returned Sailors' and Soldiers' Imperial League of Australia, including their club rooms on the Esplanade in Cairns (1938). In his home town of Atherton, Brown designed many civic and commercial buildings, including the Tinaroo Shire Council Chambers (1928), various shops, and the Grand Hotel (1933) on the corner of Main and Vernon streets. In Mossman, he designed the heritage-listed Exchange Hotel (1934), the former Jack and Newell Building (1936), which stands opposite the Exchange Hotel on the corner of Mossman Street, Mill Street and Junction Road. Other notable works by Brown include an extension to Boland's Department Store in Cairns (1936, now the Bolands Centre), the Rex Theatre in Cairns (1938), and Mareeba Fire Station (1939).

== Later life ==
Brown ceased practicing as an architect in the late 1940s and died in 1957, aged 70.
