= Mossman Gorge, Queensland =

Mossman Gorge Jinkalmu (Kuku-Yalanji)
- Town
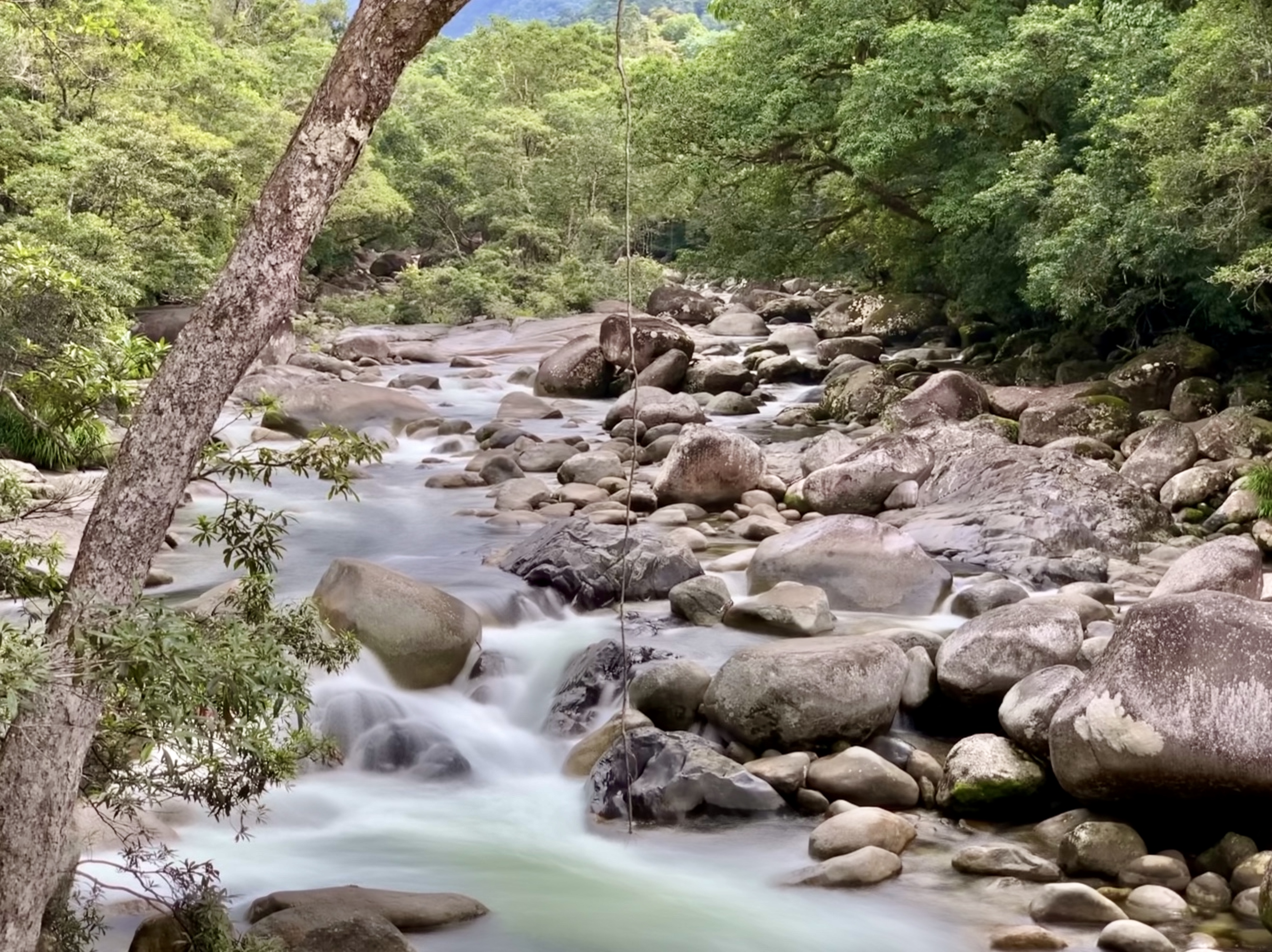
- Mossman River in the Mossman Gorge

- Interactive map of Mossman Gorge
- Coordinates: 16.4675°S 145.3519°E
- Country: Australia
- State: Queensland
- LGA: Shire of Douglas
- Location: 4.7 km (2.9 mi) SW of Mossman; 78.8 km (49.0 mi) NW of Cairns; 1,757 km (1,092 mi) NNW of Brisbane

Government
  - State electorate: Cook
  - Federal division: Leichhardt

Area
  - Total: 6.7 km^{2} (2.6 sq mi)

Population
  - Total: 248 (2021 census)
  - Density: 37.0/km^{2} (95.9/sq mi)
- Time zone: UTC+10:00 (AEST)
- Postcode: 4873
Localities around Mossman Gorge
Finlayvale	Mossman	Mossman
Finlayvale	Mossman Gorge	Mossman
Syndicate	Shannonvale	Shannonvale

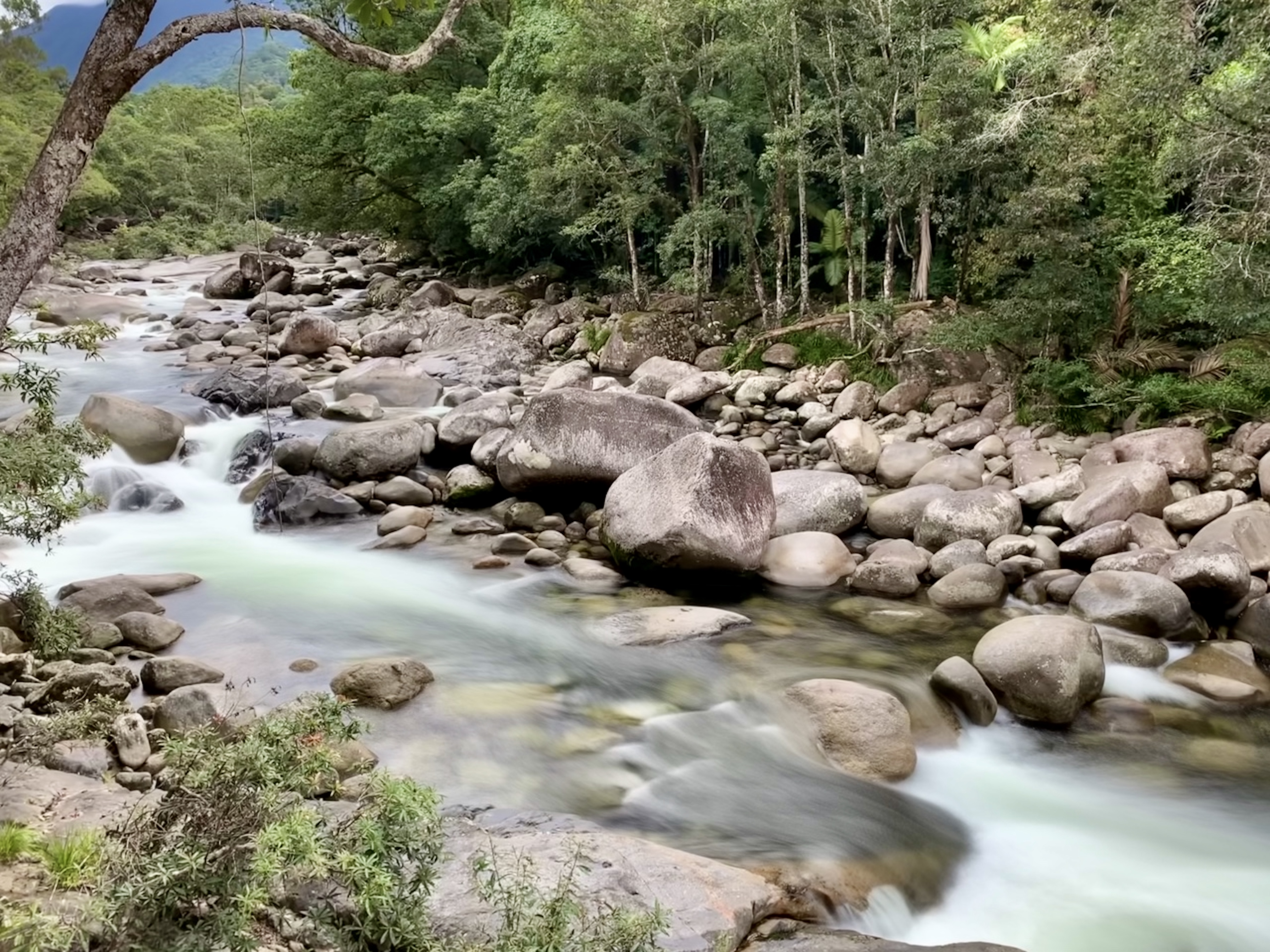
The river in Mossman Gorge

Mossman Gorge (Kuku-Yalanji: Jinkalmu) is a rural locality in the Shire of Douglas, Queensland, Australia. In the 2021 census, Mossman Gorge had a population of 248 people.

The locality takes its name from the valley Mossman Gorge created by the Mossman River through the Daintree National Park to the west of the locality (in Syndicate and Shannonvale). The Mossman Gorge Centre is the gateway to the valley which is a tourist attraction with a suspension bridge providing access to a 2.4-kilometre (1.5 mi) loop walk through the rainforest of the National Park. It is part of the traditional homeland of the indigenous Kuku Yalanji people (Goo-goo Ya-lan-gee).

== Geography ==
The locality is approximately 78.8 kilometres (49.0 mi) from Cairns along the Captain Cook Highway.

== History ==
The Eastern Kuku Yalanji (Goo-goo Ya-lan-gee) people have occupied this area for thousands of years prior to first contact. They are recognised as the traditional owners for this area.

European settlement of the Mossman Gorge district began with the discovery of gold. In 1872, William Hann was commissioned by the Queensland Government to explore Cape York Peninsula to assess its mineral and land resources. During the exploration, one of Hann's party discovered gold on the Palmer River. After hearing of the discovery, James Mulligan led an expedition to the Palmer River in 1873. Mulligan reported that the sandbars of the river glittered with gold, which started a huge gold rush to the district.

By late 1873 the first government officials and prospectors came ashore at the Endeavour River accompanied by a detachment of Native Police.

Cooktown was established to service the Palmer River. Within 4 months, Cooktown and the Palmer River goldfield had a population of about 3,000 people. After James Mulligan found gold on the Hodgkinson River in 1876, Port Douglas was established as a port to service the Hodgkinson goldfield. The town grew rapidly and at the height of the gold rush had a population of 12,000.

With the help of Native Police patrols, European settlement expanded along the coastal belt, and extensive areas of lowland rainforest were cleared. In 1874, the Native Police were sent to explore the country inland from Trinity Bay to find another road to the Palmer River. They followed the Bloomfield River upstream but were unable to penetrate the thick scrub. The Native Police officer reported that they had found the Aboriginal peoples "exceedingly daring and threatening" and ‘"had to disperse them on 3 or 4 occasions".^{[7]}

At the newly established Port Douglas, it was reported in a newspaper, with reference to the Native Police, that:

"Sub-Inspector Douglas had paid the settlement a visit and 'succeeded in driving about a dozen blackfellows into the sea, a few miles south of this place, and shortly after some desultory firing took place in a scrub close by, the result of which is not known'"

Vast amounts of cedar were harvested from the Mossman River and Daintree River valleys during the 1870s, resulting in further clashes between the Kuku Yalanji and the settlers. In 1878, Aboriginal peoples were reported to have killed three cedar cutters on the Daintree River. As was the usual practice after these events, the Native Police were sent to avenge the deaths.

In 1880, the Native Police were sent to the Mossman River after Aboriginal peoples attacked a Chinese camp and speared to death one of the occupants. By 1882, the cedar on the Mossman River was almost worked out and the land was being cleared to grow sugar cane.

In 1885, a Mossman River selector named Sydney Barnard was found dead with multiple spear wounds to his body. The Native Police were again sent out to "avenge the murder". This frontier violence was a frequent occurrence in the region during the 1870s and 1880s.

Selector Daniel Hart from the Mossman River wrote to the Queensland Premier in 1889, stating that, since the Europeans had taken all the land in the district, the Aboriginal peoples were being driven to starvation, which forced them to steal food, which then resulted in reports to the police. Then, "a dozen trackers and troopers follow their tracks and disperse them with bullets".

In 1897, the Queensland Parliament passed the Aboriginal Protection and Restriction of the Sale of Opium Act 1897 (the Protection Act). Under section 9 of the Protection Act, the Home Secretary was granted the power ‘"to cause Aboriginals within any district to be removed to and kept within the limits of any reserve situated in the same or any other district". There were 113 documented removals from the Mossman Gorge area. People were removed to settlements including Yarrabah, Mona Mona, Palm Island, Woorabinda, Cherbourg and Cape Bedford.

In 1916, an Aboriginal reserve at Mossman Gorge was gazetted on 64 acres of land donated by a cane farmer named Jack Johnston, of Mango Park Estate, Mossman River. Some of the Kuku Yalanji who had survived the onslaught of European settlement and had not been removed by the government, gradually moved to the Mossman Gorge Mission. Those who did make the shift generally came from their traditional camps at sites like Jinkalmu, Brie-Brie and the Junction on the Mossman River.

The Gorge Mission was managed by Pentecostal missionary Isabella Hetherington, who had arrived in Mossman Gorge in about 1930. Initially, Hetherington and her companion Ethel Vale lived in a humpy and undertook the heavy manual work of clearing dense scrub, planting gardens and establishing a school. As the mission was not recognised by the government, it was often without funds, but the missionaries carried out ministerial duties including conducting funerals, and tending to the sick.

In 1933, Hetherington was recognised as an Assembly of God missionary and a small school and church were built at the mission. She managed the mission until her death in August 1946. She was buried in the Mossman Gorge cemetery. After Hetherington died, Ethel Vale took over.

On 20 April 1949, the Superintendent of the Gorge Mission started "a daily school" and in 1958 children from the Gorge Mission started attending the Mossman Gorge State School. In 1960, the Gorge Mission was home to 69 people including 38 children.

In 1962, the population of Gorge Mission increased after the Daintree Mission was closed and its residents transferred to the Gorge Mission.

The Daintree Mission had its beginnings in 1926, after 120 acres of land had been gazetted as an Aboriginal reserve on the Daintree River. In 1935, the Almason Estate at Bailey's Creek was purchased for the purpose of establishing an Aboriginal mission, to be controlled by the Seventh day adventists for the Aboriginal people living around the Daintree district.

In September 1940, the Protector of Aboriginals at Mossman Gorge wrote to the Director of Native Affairs about the unsuitability of the Aboriginal reserve on the Daintree River. He noted that the land was too steep to be cultivated and there were no suitable building sites on the reserve. After Seventh Day Adventist missionary, Jardine Green, departed from the Daintree Camp in 1940, Pastor William Arehurst and his wife, who belonged to the Assemblies of God church, offered to take over and establish a mission station near the old reserve.

Pastor H S G Davidson ran the mission until his resignation in December 1945. During his time, Davidson made several unsuccessful attempts to increase his control over the Aboriginal people on the mission by requesting to be appointed a superintendent. The Director of Native Affairs Office, however, would only appoint a superintendent if the land on which the mission was situated was gazetted as an Aboriginal reserve. This was not possible unless the land, which was owned by the church, was surrendered to the Crown.

Eventually, in 1947, the Assembly of God church offered to sell the mission to the government. The purchase was not approved; the church then attempted to offer the mission to the government under a deed of trust. This option was also rejected.

On 5 July 1962, the Assembly of God advised that arrangements to close down the Daintree Mission had been completed and that the Daintree Mission families had been transferred to the Mossman Gorge Mission.

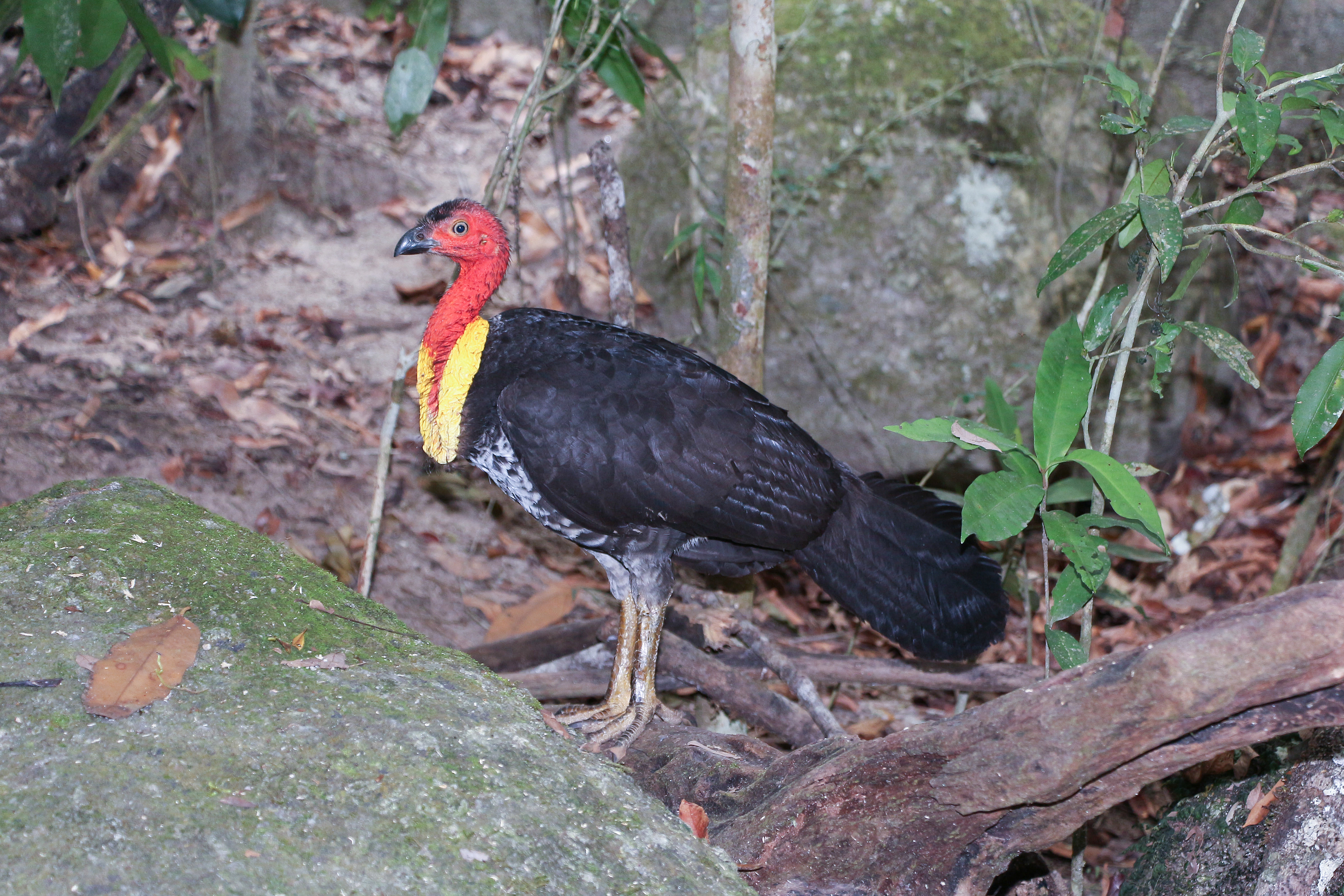
Australian brushturkey at Mossman Gorge

In 1973, one of the last Assembly of God missionaries at the Gorge Mission departed, and the mission was handed over to the Australian Inland Mission. Towards the end of the 1970s, the Brethren replaced the Church of Christ as missionaries at Mossman Gorge. At the end of 1995, the Brethren departed, leaving only itinerant missionaries.

== Demographics ==
In the 2016 census, Mossman Gorge had a population of 246 people.

In the 2021 census, Mossman Gorge had a population of 248 people.

== Education ==
There are no schools in Mossman Gorge. The nearest government primary and secondary schools are Mossman State School and Mossman State High School, both in neighbouring Mossman to the east.

== Fauna ==
Fauna commonly observed in the gorge includes the Australian brushturkey, orange-footed scrubfowl, the brilliant metallic-blue Ulysses butterfly and the Boyd's forest dragon. More than 430 species of birds have been spotted in the gorge, along with 18 species of reptiles, 12 species of amphibians and several species of fish. Seasonally, the buff-breasted paradise kingfisher visits, nests and breeds. Jungle perch or spotted flagtail fish are commonly observed in the river waters from the popular tourist spot at the river's edge.

== Flora ==
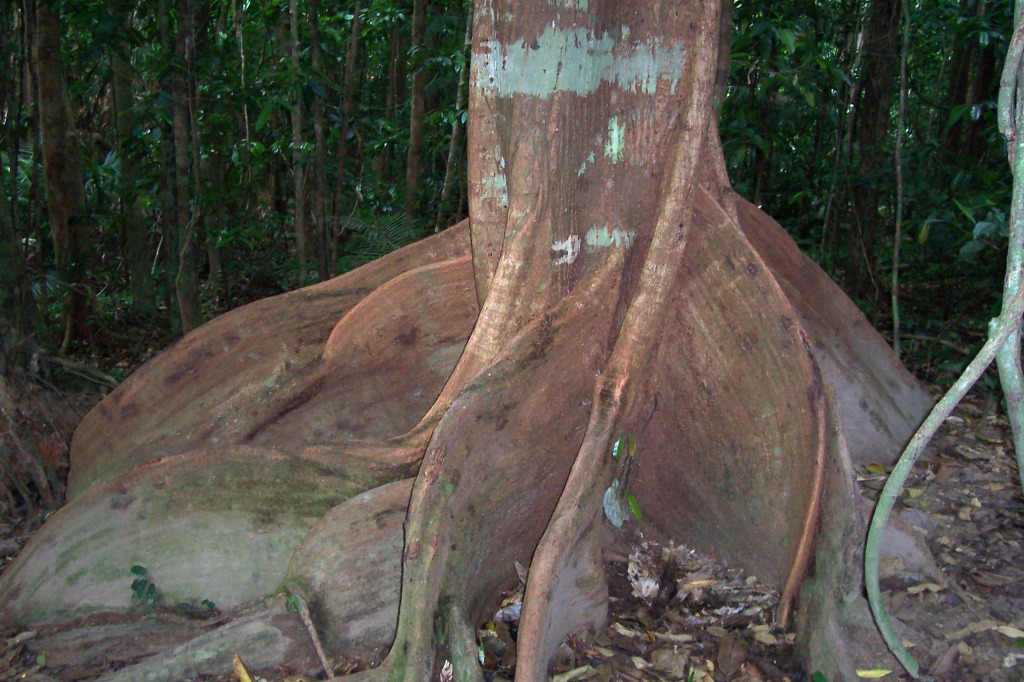
Buttressed tree trunk in Mossman Gorge

More than five hundred different species of Australian native plants grow in the lowland tropical rainforests in the gorge area, including a wide diversity of species of trees, shrubs, vines, epiphytes and ferns. Some species abundant along the public walking tracks, often noticed and photographed by tourists, are as follows. The bright orange seasonally fruiting, small shrubs of the chain fruit Alyxia oblongata and hairy red pittosporum Pittosporum rubiginosum occur commonly along the tracks. Many vine species grow up to the canopy, including the well known and conspicuous wait-a-while or rattan palm–vines Calamus australis and Calamus moti. Many epiphytes grow on the trees' branches and trunks, including the often noticed ferns, the bird's nest fern Asplenium australasicum, the basket fern Drynaria rigidula and the elkhorn fern Platycerium hillii; large epiphyte and hemiepiphyte trees and shrubs, including the many strangler figs, the umbrella tree Heptapleurum actinophyllum and the cape jitta Fagraea berteroana. Locally abundant and conspicuous large trees include the Daintree penda Lindsayomyrtus racemoides with purple new foliage in the wet season, abundant cauliflorous trees that have flowers and fruits on the trunk, for example, the common red-stemmed fig Ficus variegata and the yellow mahogany Dysoxylum parasiticum. Further locally abundant species of trees include the native nutmeg Myristica insipida, several lilly pillies (genus Syzygium), and lining the Mossman River and the creek banks the golden penda Xanthostemon chrysanthus.

== See also ==
- Protected areas of Queensland
