= Kuranda =

Kuranda may refer to:

== Places ==
- Kuranda, Queensland, a town on the Atherton Tableland in Far North Queensland, Australia
  - Kuranda Butterfly Farm, the Australian Butterfly Sanctuary, situated in the centre of Kuranda Village
  - Kuranda Fig Tree Avenue
  - Kuranda Range Highway
  - Kuranda Range road
  - Kuranda Scenic Railway, a railway line runs from Cairns, Queensland, Australia to the nearby town of Kuranda
  - Kuranda Skyrail, another name for the Skyrail Rainforest Cableway
- Kuranda, Russia, a village in Malzhagarsky Rural Okrug of Olyokminsky District of the Sakha Republic

== Other uses ==
- Kuranda (surname)
- Kuranda (planthopper), a genus of insects in the Otiocerini tribe
- Helmholtzia acorifolia, species of plant also known as kuranda

== See also ==
- Kaludah, ferry launched in Australia in 1908 as Kuranda
- Syzygium kuranda, a species of tree endemic to northeastern Queensland
- Xyroptila kuranda, a moth of the family Pterophoridae, found in southern Sulawesi and Australia
