= Leioproctus quadrimaculatus =

Scientific classification
- Kingdom: Animalia
- Phylum: Arthropoda
- Clade: Pancrustacea
- Class: Insecta
- Order: Hymenoptera
- Family: Colletidae
- Genus: Leioproctus
- Species: L. quadrimaculatus

Binomial name
- Leioproctus quadrimaculatus Maynard 2013

Species of bee

Leioproctus quadrimaculatus, or Leioproctus (Leioproctus) quadrimaculatus, is a species of bee in the family Colletidae and subfamily Colletinae. It is endemic to Australia. It was described by Australian entomologist Glynn Maynard in 2013.

== Etymology ==
The specific epithet quadrimaculatus (Latin: "four-spotted") is an anatomical reference to the patches of hair on the mesosoma.

== Description ==
Female body length is about 8 mm, male body length 7 mm. Integumental colouration is mainly black and brown. The hair is white to yellow, including four spots of yellow hair on the dorsal mesosoma.

== Distribution and habitat ==
The species occurs in the Wet Tropics of Far North Queensland. The type locality is Kuranda.

== Behaviour ==
The adults are flying mellivores.
