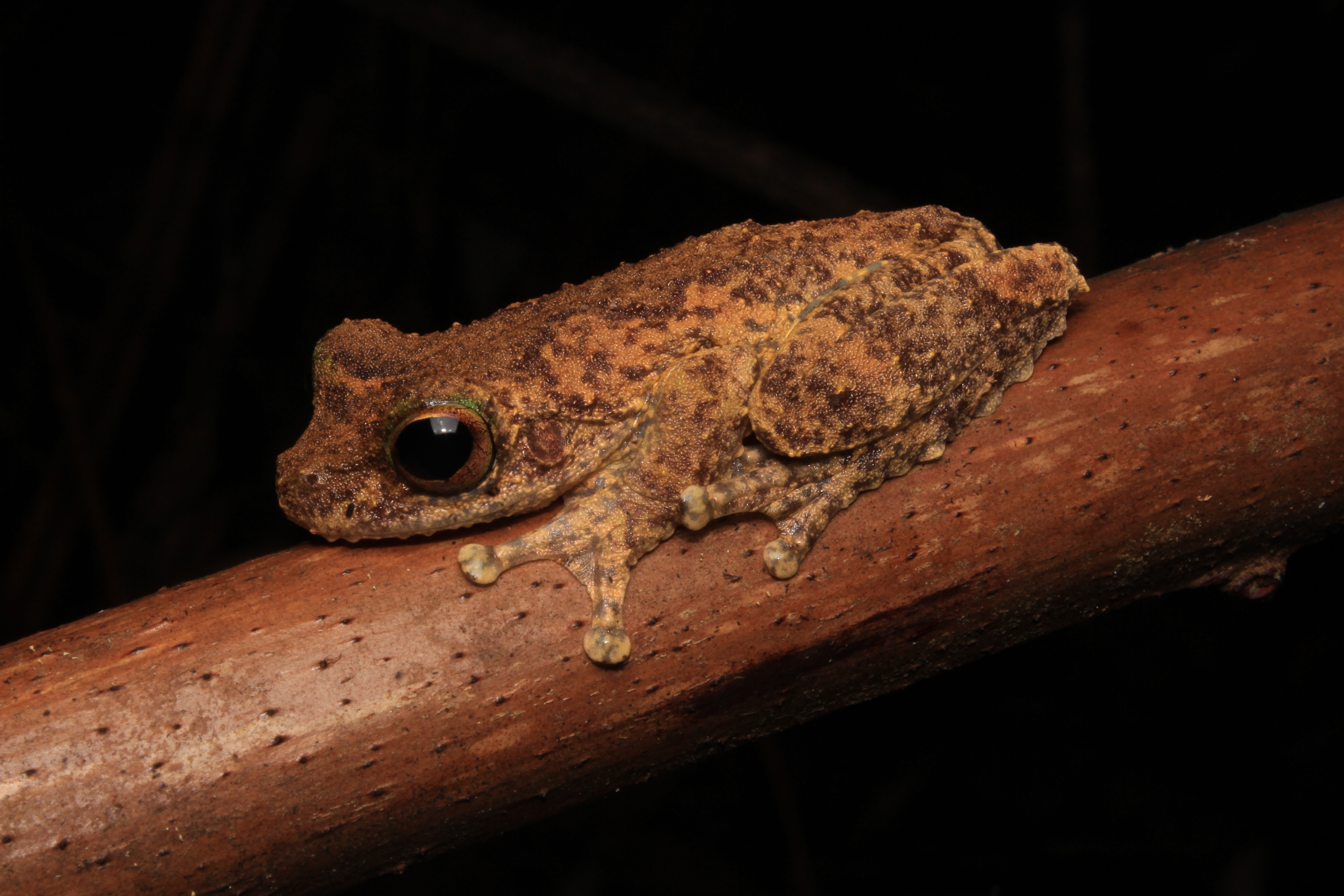
- Myola tree frog male

Conservation status
- Critically Endangered (IUCN 3.1)

Scientific classification
- Kingdom: Animalia
- Phylum: Chordata
- Class: Amphibia
- Order: Anura
- Family: Pelodryadidae
- Genus: Spicicalyx
- Species: S. myola

Binomial name
- Spicicalyx myola (Hoskin, 2007)

Synonyms
- Litoria myola Hoskin, 2007

= Spicicalyx myola =

Species of amphibian

Spicicalyx myola, commonly known as the Kuranda tree frog or Myola tree frog, is a critically endangered species of frog in the family Pelodryadidae. It is endemic to the wet tropics of Australia.

== Description ==
Spicicalyx myola is similar to the green-eyed tree frog. It is a medium-sized stream and tropical forest frog. There is sexual dimorphism displayed between sexes; males are smaller than the females. This species is generally a mottled pattern of tan and brown on the body and a whitish cream color on the ventral surface but variations occur. A green crescent is visible above the eye (also present in the co-existing green eye tree frog) and iris and the back surface of forearms and legs are fringed as in the similar and co-existing green-eyed tree frog.

== Distribution and habitat ==
Spicicalyx myola is native to Far North Queensland, Australia. It is mainly found in tributaries and creeks flowing from the Barron river around Kuranda, Myola, Kowrowa and Oak Forest. This species is threatened by habitat destruction, domestic animal predation, invasive weeds, hybridization and the chytrid fungus. Most of its current forested range has been cleared and has re-grown.
