= Hylaeus serotinellus =

Scientific classification
- Kingdom: Animalia
- Phylum: Arthropoda
- Clade: Pancrustacea
- Class: Insecta
- Order: Hymenoptera
- Family: Colletidae
- Genus: Hylaeus
- Species: H. serotinellus

Binomial name
- Hylaeus serotinellus (Cockerell, 1906)

Synonyms
- Prosopisteron serotinellum Cockerell, 1906; Prosopis maculipennis Friese, 1924; Prosopis vittipennis Friese, 1924

Species of bee

Hylaeus serotinellus, or Hylaeus (Prosopisteron) serotinellus, is a species of bee in the family Colletidae and subfamily Hylaeinae. It is endemic to Australia. It was described by British-American entomologist Theodore Dru Alison Cockerell in 1906.

== Description ==
Female body length is 6.5 mm. Integumental colouration is mainly black, with yellow and brown markings.

== Distribution and habitat ==
The species occurs in north-eastern Australia. Type localities include Mackay and Kuranda.

== Behaviour ==
The adults are flying mellivores. Flowering plants visited by the bees include Cassia, Eucalyptus, Eugenia, Jacksonia and Leptospermum species.
