= Spicicalyx genimaculata =

Conservation status
- Least Concern (IUCN 3.1)

Scientific classification
- Kingdom: Animalia
- Phylum: Chordata
- Class: Amphibia
- Order: Anura
- Family: Pelodryadidae
- Genus: Spicicalyx
- Species: S. genimaculata

Binomial name
- Spicicalyx genimaculata (Horst 1883)

Synonyms
- Litoria genimaculata (Tyler, Davies & Aplin, 1986)

Species of frog

Spicicalyx genimaculata is a species of frog in the family Pelodryadidae that is endemic to New Guinea and its offshore islands.

The scientific name Spicicalyx genimaculata (previously known as Litoria genimaculata) was used to describe both this species and the north-Australian species Spicicalyx serrata, until they were separated in 2010.
