= Kuranda National Park =

National park in Queensland, Australia

- IUCN category II (national park)
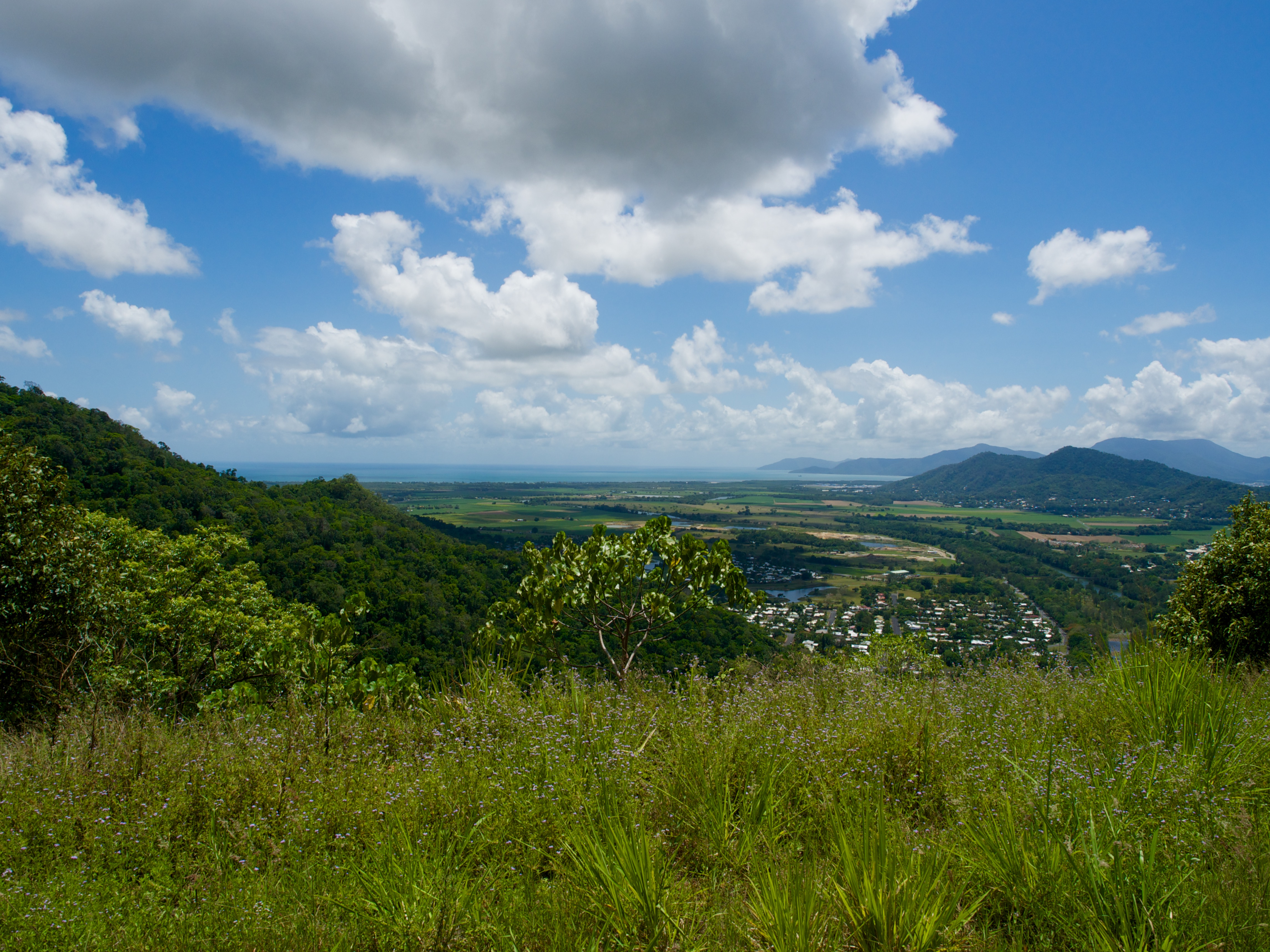
- Kuranda National Park, December 2015

- Location within Queensland
- Location: Queensland
- Nearest city: Kuranda
- Coordinates: 16°45′53″S 145°35′11″E
- Area: 27,100 ha (105 sq mi)
- Governing body: Queensland Parks and Wildlife Service
- Website: Official website

Kuranda National Park is a national park in Far North Queensland, Australia. Like many national parks in the area it belongs to the Wet Tropics World Heritage Area. The park protects an important wildlife corridor in which rainforest and open eucalypt forest predominate. Walking, mountain biking and four-wheel driving are popular recreational activities.

Kuranda National Park provides habitat for the southern cassowary, the rare Lumholtz's tree-kangaroo and the Victoria's riflebird. The fungal disease Myrtle rust has been found in the park.

== Geography ==
The park covers 27,100 hectares (67,000 acres) of mountainous tropical forest north west of Cairns. To its north is Mowbray National Park, north east Macalister Range National Park, in the east is Smithfield Conservation Park, south is Barron Gorge National Park and in the west is Kuranda West Forest Reserve. Kuranda National Park occupies parts of Mona Mona, Mount Molloy, Macalister Range and Kuranda. This includes parts of Cairns Region and the Mareeba Shire local government areas. It covers some of the most easterly parts of the Mitchell River water catchment, the Barron River catchment and several coastal creeks to the north of Cairns.

== Access ==
Access to the park is provided by Black Mountain Road which leaves the Kennedy Highway near Kuranda. The road closes in wetter months and after periods of heavy rain.

== Facilities ==
There is one long distance walking track in the park. The Twin Bridges track is 18 km in length, one way.

== See also ==
- Protected areas of Queensland
