= Biboohra, Queensland =

Biboohra
- Town
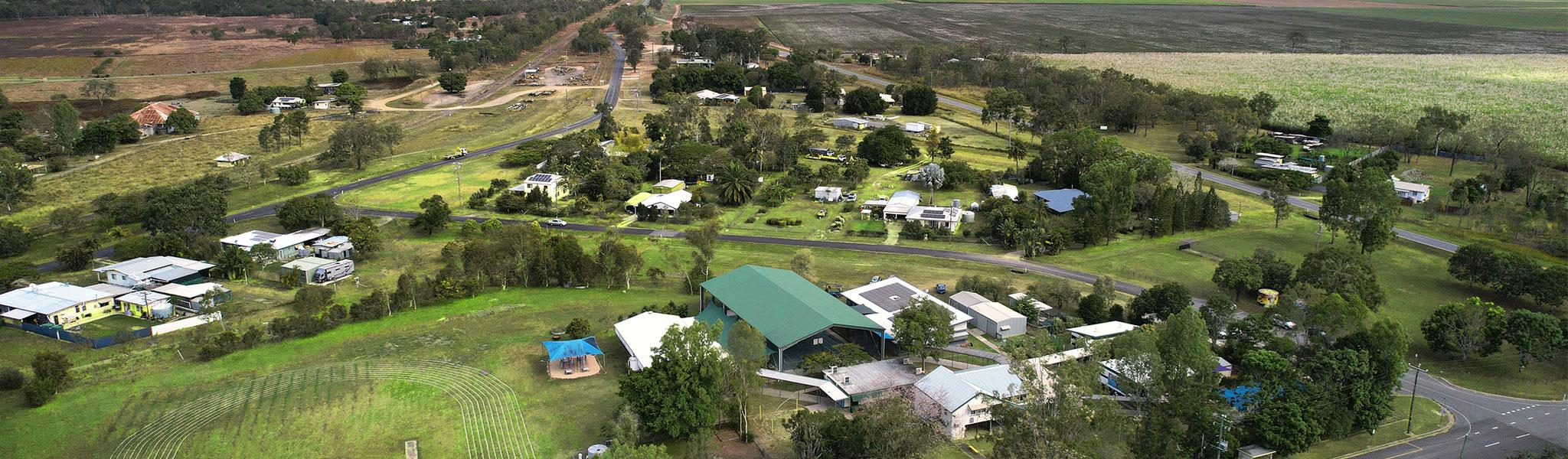
- Biboohra State School and town beyond, 2025

- Interactive map of Biboohra
- Coordinates: 16.9155°S 145.4197°E
- Country: Australia
- State: Queensland
- LGA: Shire of Mareeba
- Location: 9.7 km (6.0 mi) N of Mareeba; 42.7 km (26.5 mi) N of Atherton; 68.7 km (42.7 mi) W of Cairns CBD; 1,756 km (1,091 mi) NNW of Brisbane

Government
  - State electorate: Cook
  - Federal division: Kennedy

Area
  - Total: 146.0 km^{2} (56.4 sq mi)

Population
  - Total: 561 (2021 census)
  - Density: 3.842/km^{2} (9.952/sq mi)
- Time zone: UTC+10:00 (AEST)
- Postcode: 4880
Localities around Biboohra
Southedge	Mount Molloy	Mona Mona
Southedge	Biboohra	Koah
Paddys Green	Mareeba	Koah

Biboohra is a rural town and locality in the Shire of Mareeba, Queensland, Australia. In the 2021 census, the locality of Biboohra had a population of 561 people.

== Geography ==
The town is close to the southern boundary of the locality. The Mulligan Highway traverses the locality from the south (Mareeba) to the west (Southedge), passing the western edge of the town. The Tablelands railway line traverses the locality from the south (Mareeba) to the east (Koah), passing the eastern edge of the town. Historically, the locality was served by a number of now-abandoned railway stations (from south to north):

- Biboohra railway station (16.9196°S 145.4201°E)
- Pukanja railway station (16.9096°S 145.4292°E)
- Bilwon railway station (16.8522°S 145.4573°E)
- Kambul railway station (16.8458°S 145.4733°E)

The Barron River flows through the locality from south to east passing to the immediate east of the town. The Bilwon State Forest is in the south-east of the locality. Most of the locality is used for farming with both grazing cattle and cropping, including mangoes, turf, and sugarcane.

== History ==
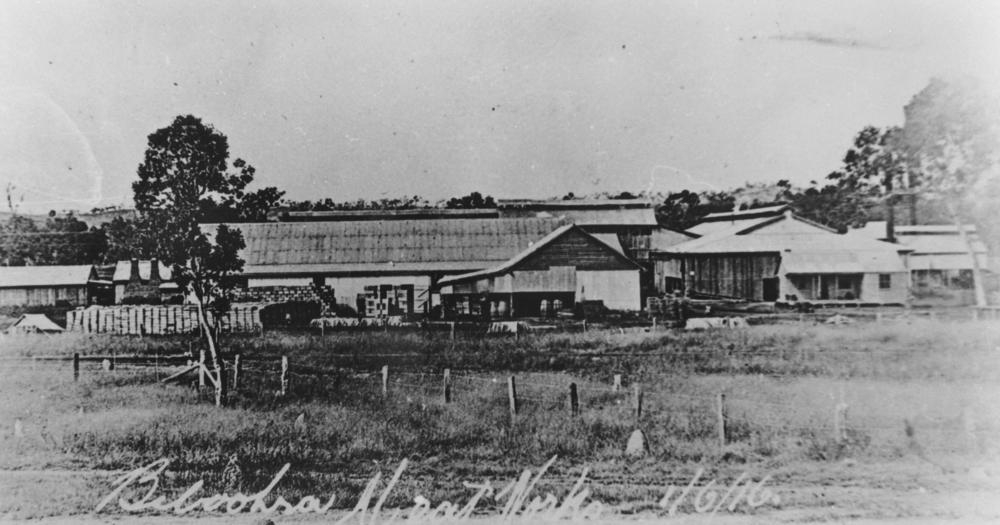
Biboohra Meatworks, 1916

The town takes its name from its railway station, which in turn was named in 1884. It is believed that Biboohra is an Aboriginal name for the Barron Falls.

The Biboohra Meatworks operated intermittently from 1896 to 1927.

Biboohra Provisional School opened on 20 January 1902, becoming Biboohra State School on 1 January 1909.

Mud Park Australia iwas an obstacle course on land and on water to be tackled using amphibious all-terrain vehicles. As at 2022, it has closed.

== Demographics ==
In the 2016 census, the locality of Biboohra had a population of 568 people.

In the 2021 census, the locality of Biboohra had a population of 561 people.

== Education ==
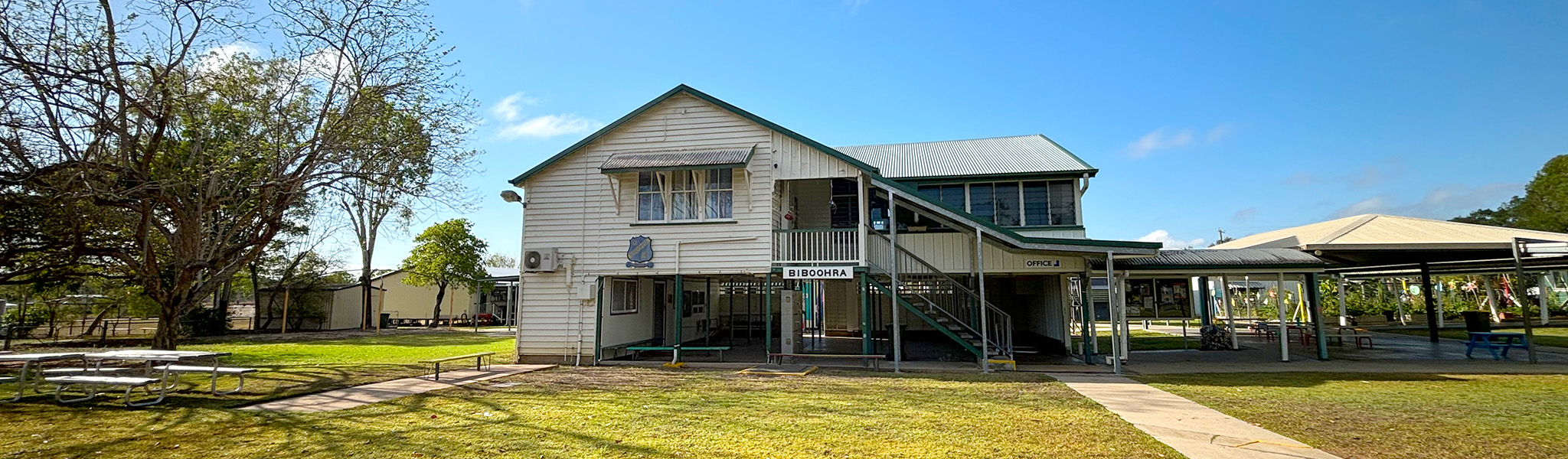
Biboohra State School, 2025

Biboohra State School is a government primary (Prep-6) school for boys and girls on Petersen Street (16.9158°S 145.4191°E). In 2016, the school had an enrolment of 91 students with 6 teachers (5 full-time equivalent) and 7 non-teaching staff (4 full-time equivalent). In 2018, the school had an enrolment of 86 students with 6 teachers (5 full-time equivalent) and 8 non-teaching staff (5 full-time equivalent).

There are no secondary schools in Biboohra. The nearest government secondary school is Mareeba State High School in neighbouring Mareeba to the south.
