= Spicicalyx exophthalmia =

Conservation status
- Least Concern (IUCN 3.1)

Scientific classification
- Kingdom: Animalia
- Phylum: Chordata
- Class: Amphibia
- Order: Anura
- Family: Pelodryadidae
- Genus: Spicicalyx
- Species: S. exophthalmia

Binomial name
- Spicicalyx exophthalmia (Tyler, Davies & Aplin, 1986)

Synonyms
- Litoria exophthalmia (Tyler, Davies & Aplin, 1986)

Species of frog

Spicicalyx exophthalmia is a species of frog in the family Pelodryadidae . It is commonly known as the big-eyed tree frog, but that name may also refer to the African species, Leptopelis vermiculatus. It is endemic to Papua New Guinea. Its natural habitats are subtropical or tropical moist lowland forests, subtropical or tropical moist montane forests, and rivers.
