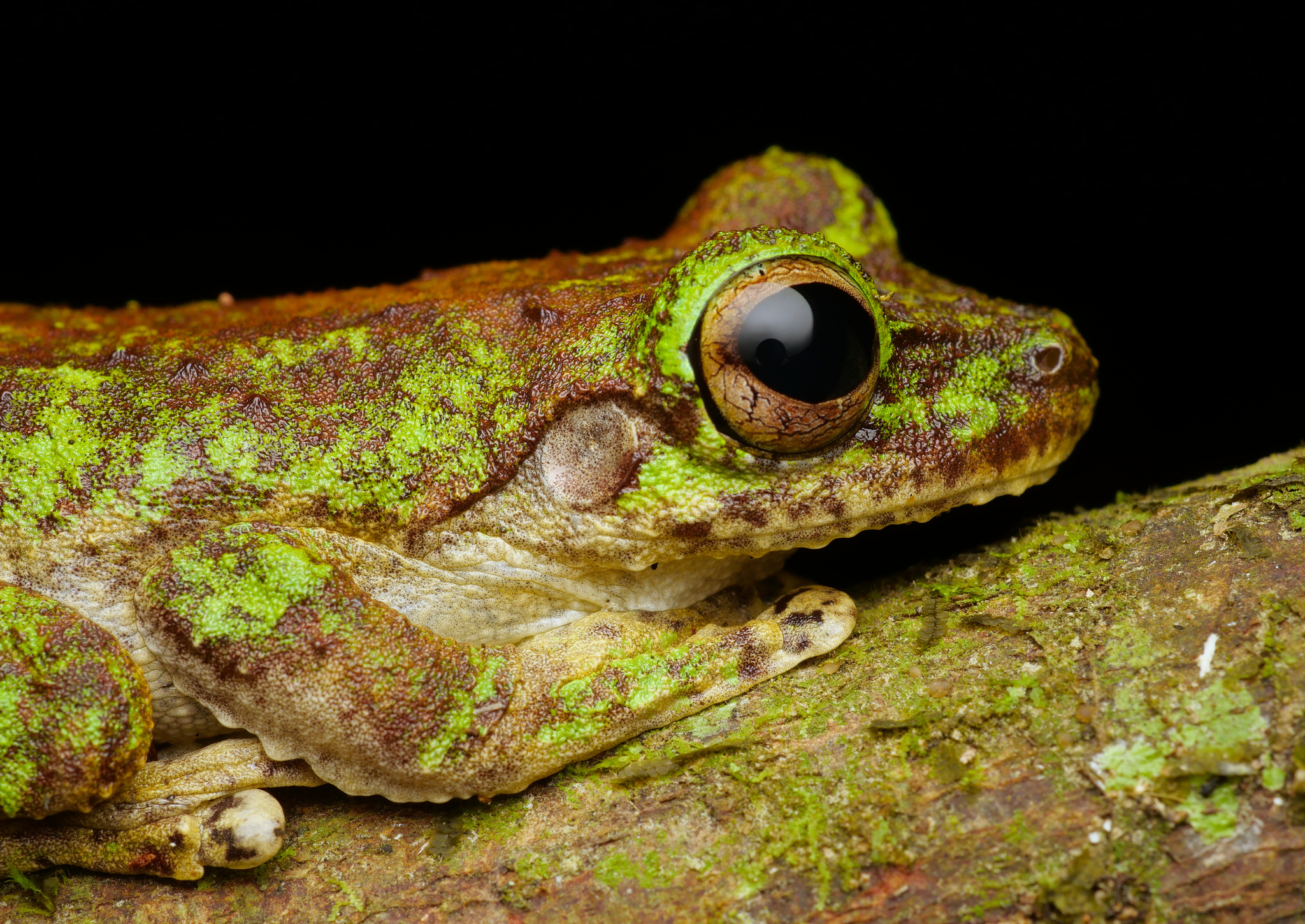

Conservation status
- Least Concern (IUCN 3.1)

Scientific classification
- Kingdom: Animalia
- Phylum: Chordata
- Class: Amphibia
- Order: Anura
- Family: Pelodryadidae
- Genus: Spicicalyx
- Species: S. eucnemis

Binomial name
- Spicicalyx eucnemis (Lönnberg, 1900)

Synonyms
- Hyla eucnemis Lönnberg, 1900; Hyla rhacophorus Van Kampen, 1909; Nyctimystes loveridgei Neill, 1954; Hyla loveridgei — Zweifel, 1958; Litoria eucnemis — Tyler, 1971; Dryopsophus eucnemis — Duellman, Marion, and Hedges, 2016; Ranoidea eucnemis — Dubois and Frétey, 2016

= Fringed tree frog =

Species of amphibian

The fringed tree frog (Spicicalyx eucnemis) is a species of frog in the family Pelodryadidae. It is found in Australia and New Guinea. Its natural habitats are subtropical or tropical moist lowland forests, subtropical or tropical moist montane forests, rivers, intermittent rivers, rural gardens, and heavily degraded former forest.

It is threatened by habitat loss.
