= Mona Mona, Queensland =

Mona Mona
- Suburb
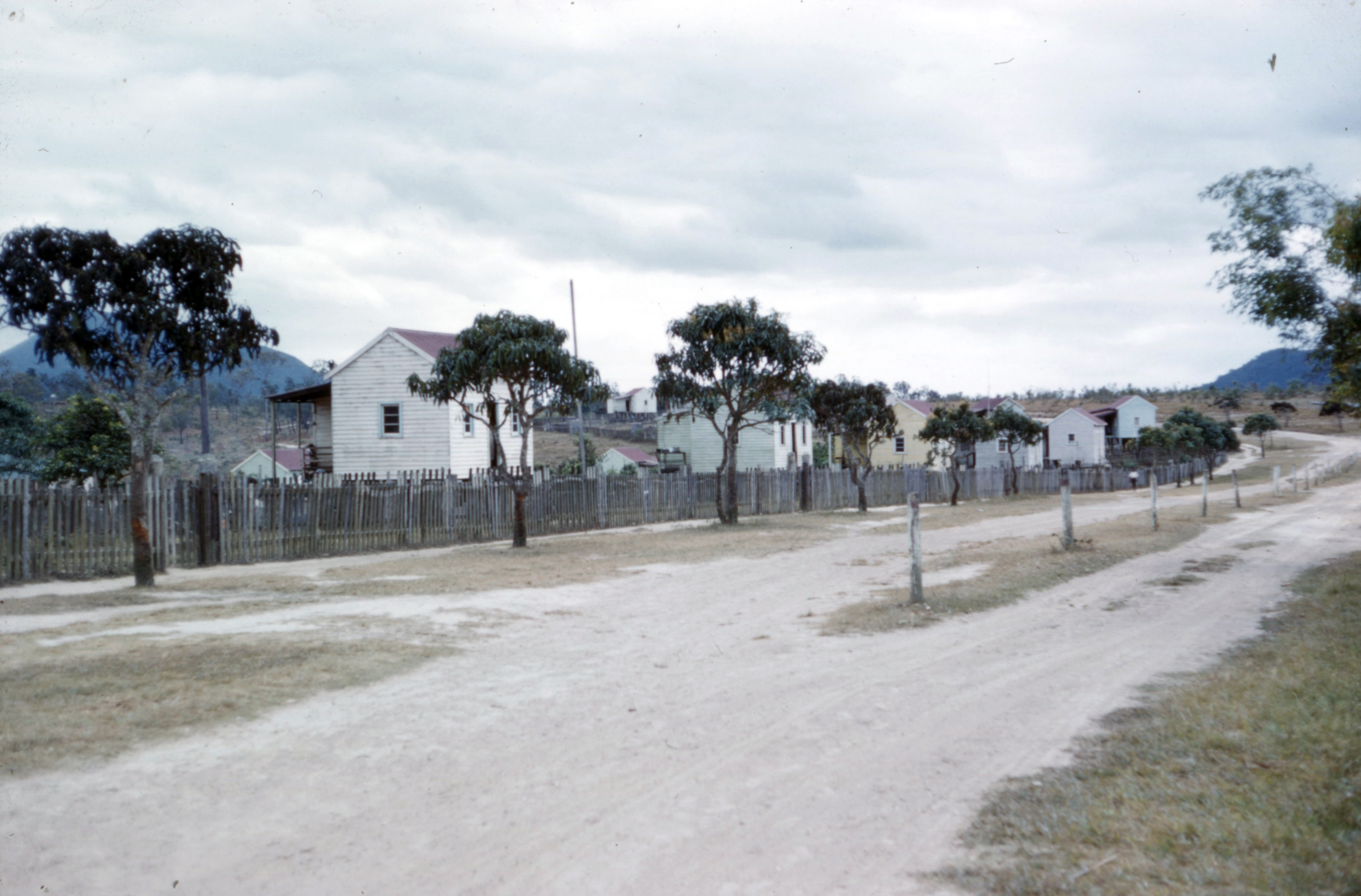
- Main street, Mona Mona Aboriginal Mission, 1959-1960

- Interactive map of Mona Mona
- Coordinates: 16.7325°S 145.5608°E
- Country: Australia
- State: Queensland
- LGA: Shire of Mareeba
- Location: 21.2 km (13.2 mi) NW of Kuranda; 43.4 km (27.0 mi) NW of Cairns CBD; 55.9 km (34.7 mi) NE of Mareeba; 1,738 km (1,080 mi) NNW of Brisbane

Government
  - State electorates: Barron River; Cook
  - Federal divisions: Leichhardt; Kennedy

Area
  - Total: 219.9 km^{2} (84.9 sq mi)

Population
  - Total: 29 (2021 census)
  - Density: 0.1319/km^{2} (0.342/sq mi)
- Postcode: 4881
Suburbs around Mona Mona
Mount Molloy	Mowbray	Wangetti
Biboohra	Mona Mona	Macalister Range
Koah	Kuranda	Kuranda

Mona Mona is a rural locality in the Shire of Mareeba, Queensland, Australia. In the 2021 census, Mona Mona had a population of 29 people.

== Geography ==
The Great Dividing Range passes through the north-western corner of the locality, but most of the locality is to the east of the range within the North East Coast drainage basin and specifically within the catchment of the Barron River. The small north-western section is within the Gulf of Carpentaria drainage basin and specifically within the Mitchell River catchment.

The Macalister Range has its northern extent in Mona Mona and forms the north-eastern and eastern boundary of the locality. Segments of the Barron River forms part of the locality's south-western boundary.

Mona Mona has the following mountains (from north to south):

- Red Hill (16.6996°S 145.4913°E)
- Mount Formartine (North Summit) (16.7152°S 145.6115°E) 764 metres (2,507 ft)
- Mount Formartine (South Summit) (16.7281°S 145.6144°E) 748 metres (2,454 ft)
- Mount Buchan (16.7432°S 145.6425°E) 602 metres (1,975 ft)
- Rainy Mountain (16.7687°S 145.5862°E) 753 metres (2,470 ft)

Most of the locality is within the protected areas of the Kuranda National Park and the Kuranda West Forest Reserve, which form part of the Wet Tropics of Queensland (a UNESCO World Heritage Site). In addition, land is also reserved within the Kuranda State Forest. The remaining land use is grazing on native vegetation with some rural residential housing, associated with the former Mona Mona Aboriginal Mission.

== History ==
The Mona Mona Aboriginal Mission was established in 1913 by the Seventh-Day Adventist Church. It closed in 1963. However, some Aboriginal people have returned to Mona Mona where they were granted a 30-year lease in 2010.

== Demographics ==
In the 2016 census, Mona Mona had a population of 32 people.

In the 2021 census, Mona Mona had a population of 29 people.

== Education ==
There are no schools in Mona Mona. The nearest government primary and secondary school is Kuranda District State College in neighbouring Kuranda to the south. There is also a Steiner school in Kuranda.
