= Speewah, Queensland =

Speewah
- Suburb
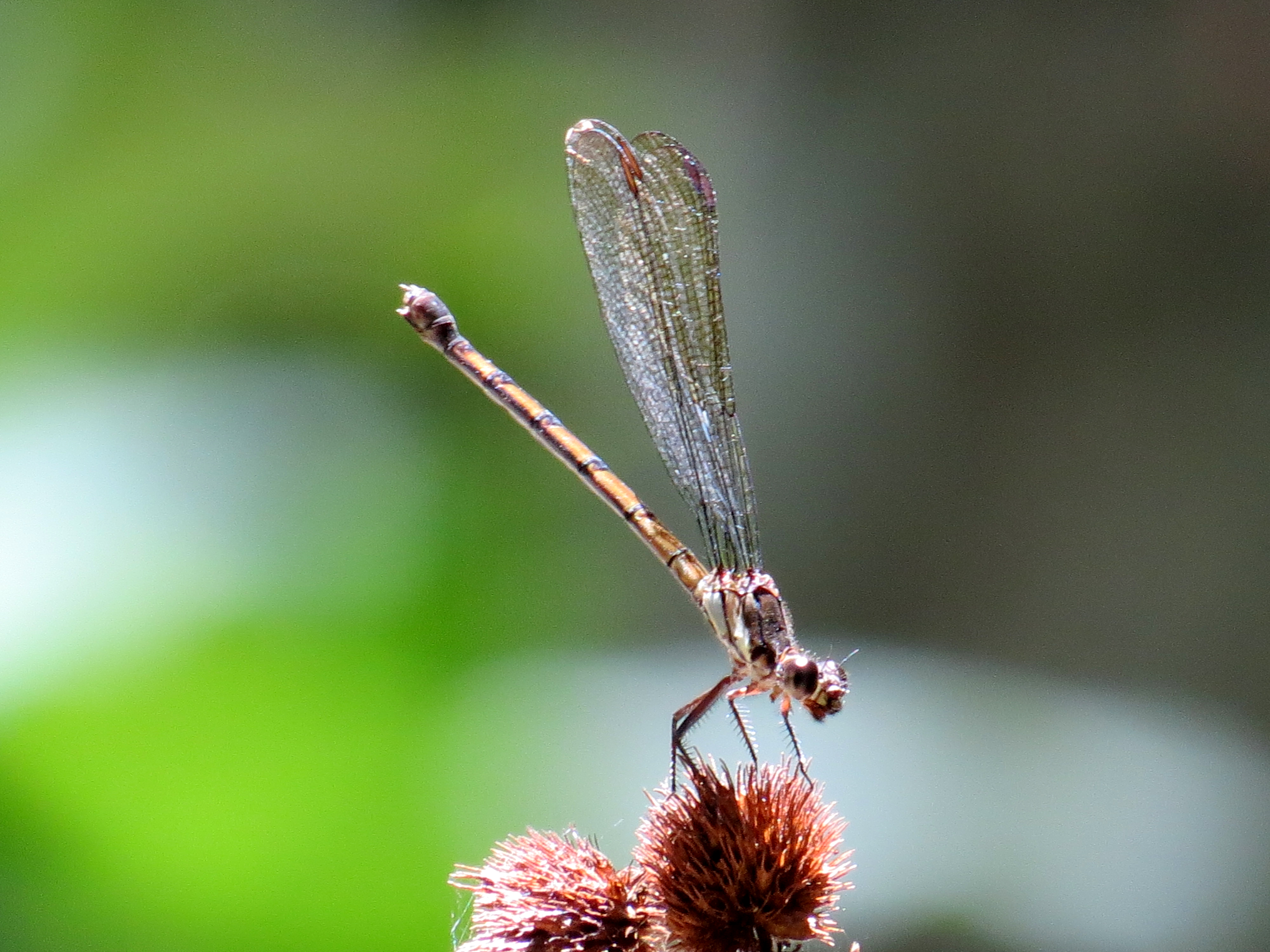
- Female tropical rockmaster (damselfly) at Speewah, 2014

- Interactive map of Speewah
- Coordinates: 16.8913°S 145.6261°E
- Country: Australia
- State: Queensland
- LGA: Shire of Mareeba
- Location: 11.6 km (7.2 mi) SSW of Kuranda; 34.1 km (21.2 mi) NE of Mareeba; 37.2 km (23.1 mi) NW of Cairns; 382 km (237 mi) NNW of Townsville; 1,730 km (1,070 mi) NNW of Brisbane

Government
  - State electorate: Barron River
  - Federal division: Leichhardt

Area
  - Total: 35.3 km^{2} (13.6 sq mi)

Population
  - Total: 850 (2021 census)
  - Density: 24.08/km^{2} (62.4/sq mi)
- Time zone: UTC+10:00 (AEST)
- Postcode: 4881
Suburbs around Speewah
Kuranda	Kuranda	Kuranda
Koah	Speewah	Barron Gorge
Koah	Koah	Lamb Range

Speewah is a rural locality in the Shire of Mareeba, Queensland, Australia. In the 2021 census, Speewah had a population of 850 people.

== Geography ==
The Kennedy Highway is the north-west boundary of the locality.

The terrain is mountainous with individual peaks including Yalbogie Hill at 645 metres (2,116 ft), North Peak at 670 metres (2,200 ft) and Mount Williams at 1,017 metres (3,337 ft).

The south-eastern part of the locality are in Dinden National Park (part of the Wet Tropics of Queensland, a UNESCO world heritage site) and Speewah Conservation Park.

Apart from these protected areas, the land use is partly rural residential housing and some grazing on native vegetation. Other areas remain undeveloped land.

== Demographics ==
In the 2016 census, Speewah had a population of 855 people.

In the 2021 census, Speewah had a population of 850 people.

== Education ==
There are no schools in Speewah. The nearest government school is Kuranda District State College in neighbouring Kuranda which offers both primary and secondary schooling.
