= Koah =

- Suburb
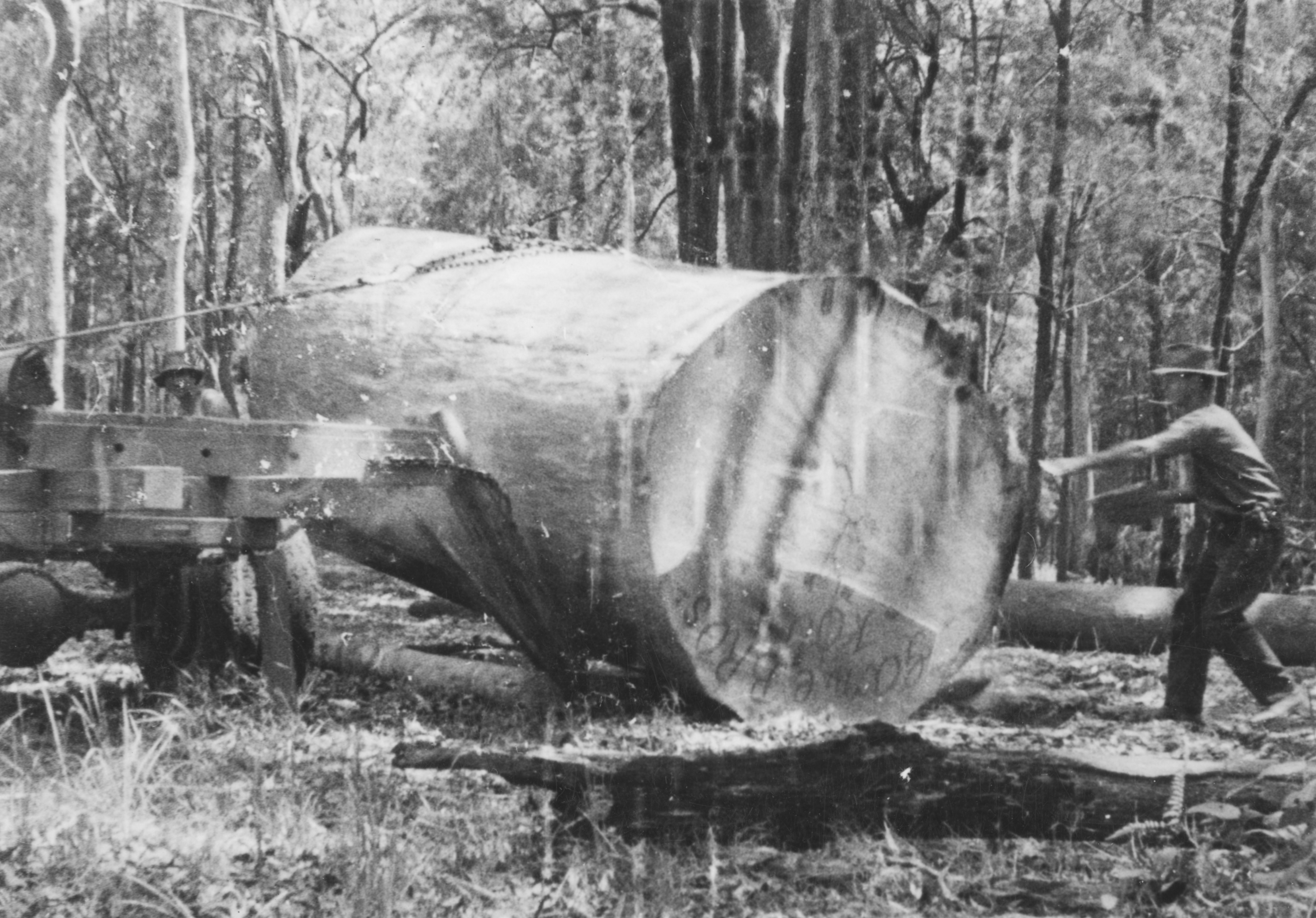
- Gane Brothers felling a large tree with a crosscut saw, near Koah, circa 1930

- Interactive map of Koah
- Coordinates: 16.9058°S 145.5575°E
- Country: Australia
- State: Queensland
- LGA: Shire of Mareeba
- Location: 13.7 km (8.5 mi) SW of Kuranda; 26.3 km (16.3 mi) NE of Mareeba; 39.3 km (24.4 mi) W of Cairns; 1,742 km (1,082 mi) NNW of Brisbane

Government
  - State electorates: Cook; Barron River
  - Federal divisions: Kennedy; Leichhardt

Area
  - Total: 225.2 km^{2} (87.0 sq mi)

Population
  - Total: 676 (2021 census)
  - Density: 3.0018/km^{2} (7.775/sq mi)
- Time zone: UTC+10:00 (AEST)
- Postcode: 4881
Suburbs around Koah
Biboohra	Mona Mona	Kuranda
Biboohra	Koah	Speewah
Mareeba	Lamb Range	Barron Gorge

Koah is a rural locality in the Shire of Mareeba, Queensland, Australia. In the 2021 census, Koah had a population of 676 people.

== Geography ==
The Barron River enters the locality from the north-west (Biboorha) and loosely follows the locality's northern boundary before exiting to the north-east (Mona Mona / Kuranda). The Clohesy River rises in the south of the locality and flows north through the locality becoming a tributary of the Barron River in the north of the locality (16.822003°S 145.512503°E). The river was named after Thomas Clohesy, a police inspector who served in North Queensland for many years.

The Tablelands railway line enters the locality from the north-east (Kuranda) and passes through the north of the locality (but south of the river), before exiting to the north-west (Bibhoora). There is no railway station at Koah and the only trains which use the track are the Sunlander tourist trains.

The Kennedy Highway enters the locality from the east (Kuranda / Speewah) and exits to the south-west (Mareeba).

Bare Hill lies in the south of the locality (16.9859°S 145.5937°E), rising 841 metres (2,759 ft) above sea level.

Many parts of the locality are within protected areas. The Bilwon State Forest is in the west and north-west of the locality. In the south-west of the locality are the Dinden State Fores and the Dinden West Forest Reserve. The Bare Hill Conservation Park is in the south of the locality and the Dinden National Park is in the south-east of the locality.

Apart from the protected areas, the land use is a mixture of rural residential housing and crop growing along the Clohesy River and grazing on native vegetation away from the river.

== Demographics ==
In the 2016 census, Koah had a population of 602 people.

In the 2021 census, Koah had a population of 676 people.

== Education ==
There are no schools in Koah. The nearest government primary schools are Mareeba State School in neighbouring Mareeba to the south-west, Biboohra State School in neighbouring Biboohra to the west, and Kuranda District State College in Kuranda to the east. The nearest government secondary schools are Kuranda District State College in Kuranda and Mareeba State High School in Mareeba.

== Amenities ==
Mususeci Park is at 322 Koah Road (16.8759°S 145.5499°E). The park features Koah Hall, facilities for tennis and basketball, and a playground. The park also hosts the Koah Fural Fire Service.

== Events ==
Koah Hall hosts regular classes and workshops. The Koah Monthly Markets are held at the hall on the first Saturday of every month (excluding January and February).
