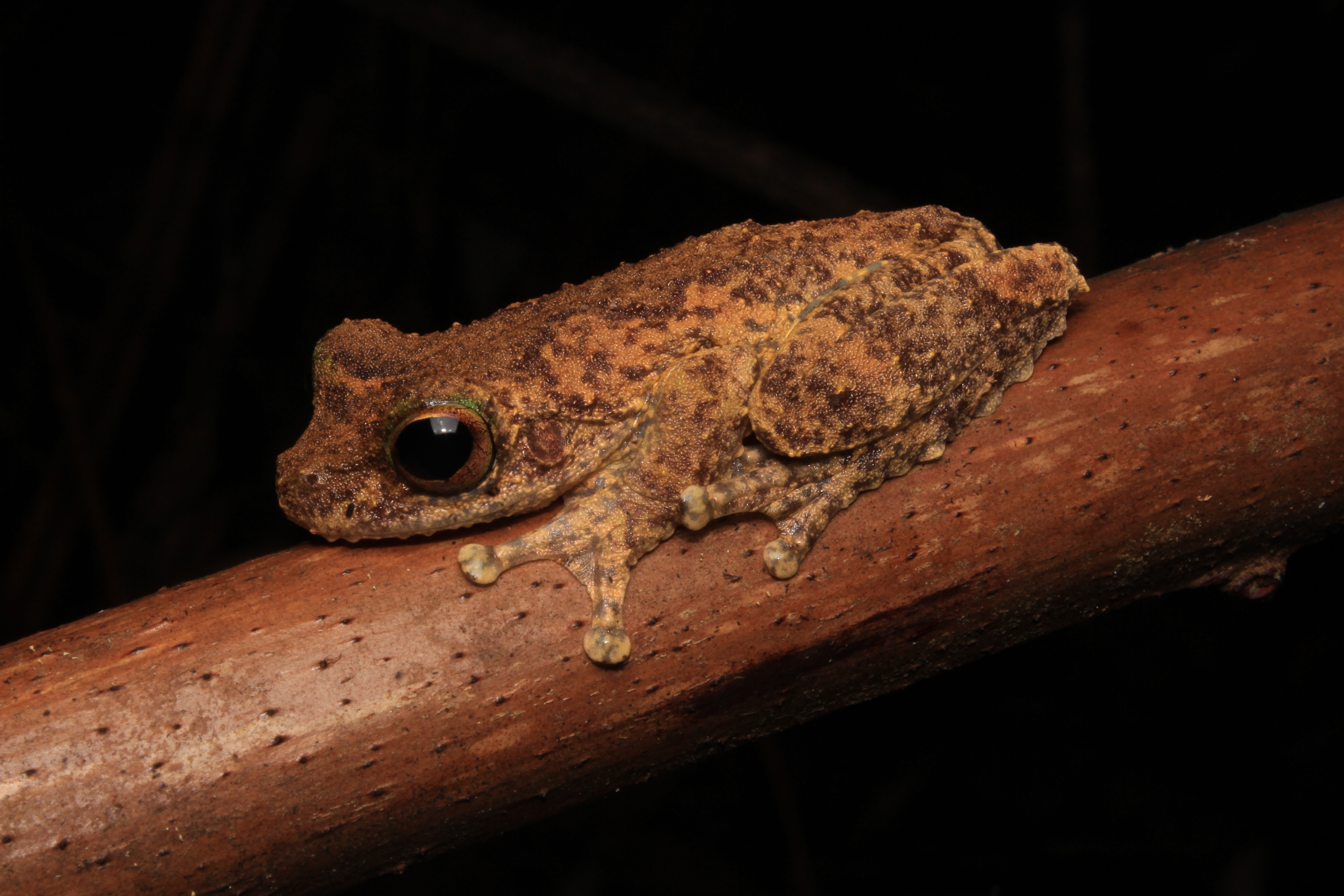
- Male Spicicalyx myola

Scientific classification
- Kingdom: Animalia
- Phylum: Chordata
- Class: Amphibia
- Order: Anura
- Family: Pelodryadidae
- Genus: Spicicalyx; Donnellan, Mahony & Richards, 2025

Species
- See text

= Spicicalyx =

Genus of amphibians

Spicicalyx is a genus of stream-dwelling frogs in the family Pelodryadidae. These frogs are native to north-eastern Australia, New Guinea and its surrounding islands. Species in the genus were previously included within the wastebasket genus Litoria, but were separated into a new genus in 2025. They are small-to-medium sized frogs, with mottled colours and highly textured and fringed skin that has evolved to camouflage into rainforest environments.

The genus name comes from the Latin spica meaning "point or spear" and calx meaning "heel", in reference to the pointed heel in many species.

== Species ==
Spicicalyx contains six species:

Common name	Binomial name
Fringed tree frog	Spicicalyx eucnemis (Lönnberg, 1900)
Big-eyed tree frog	Spicicalyx exophthalmia (Tyler, Davies, and Aplin, 1986)
Papuan green-eyed treefrog	Spicicalyx genimaculata (Horst, 1883)
Kuranda tree frog	Spicicalyx myola (Hoskin, 2007)
	Spicicalyx papua (Van Kampen, 1909)
Green-eyed treefrog	Spicicalyx serrata (Andersson, 1916)
