= Kuranda (surname) =

Kuranda is a surname. Notable people with the surname include:

- Hugo Kuranda (1910–?), Austrian skeleton racer
- Ignaz Kuranda (1812–1884), Bohemian-Austrian deputy and political writer
- Richard Kuranda (born 1969), American actor and theatrical director
