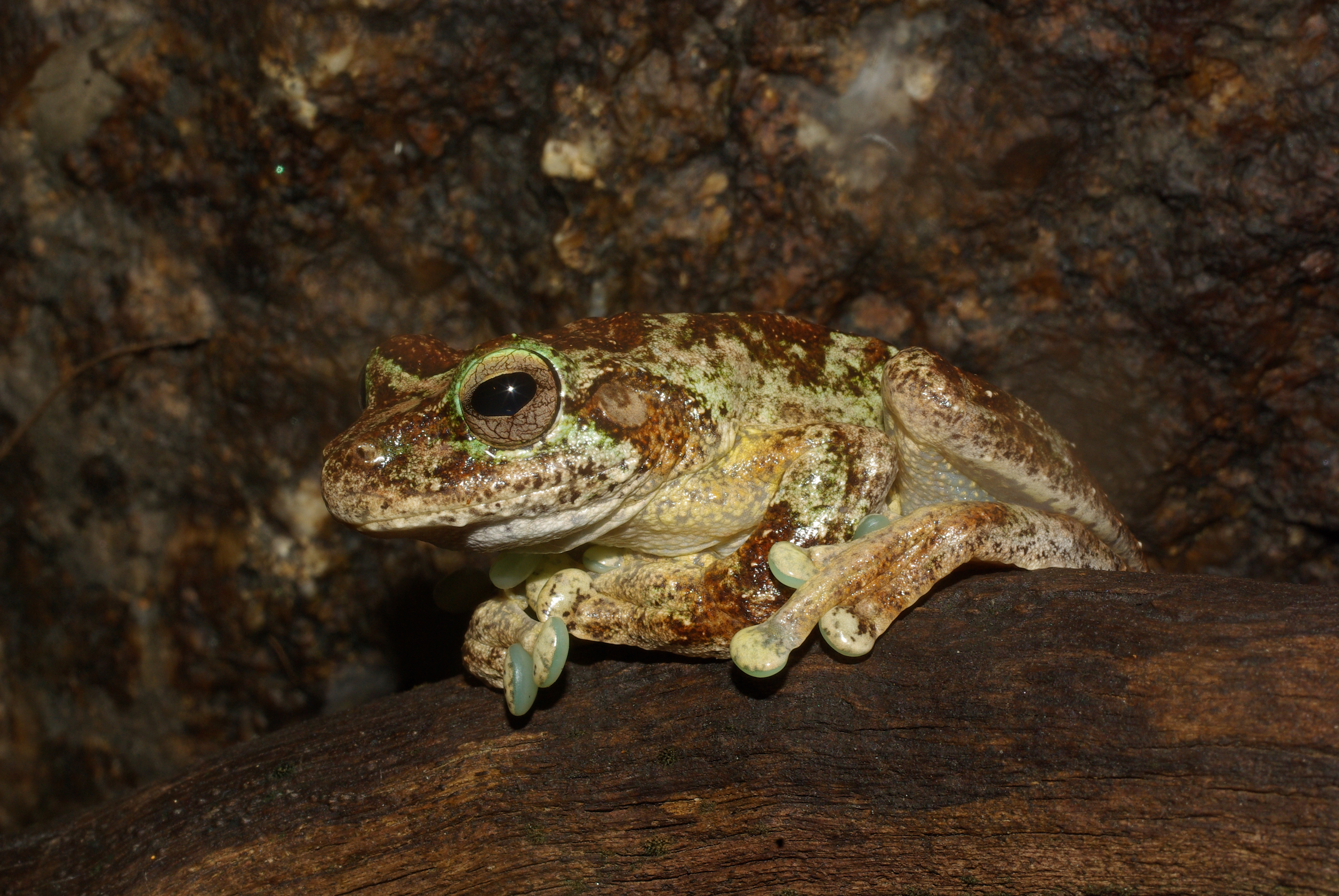
- Female green-eyed treefrog

Conservation status
- Least Concern (IUCN 3.1)

Scientific classification
- Kingdom: Animalia
- Phylum: Chordata
- Class: Amphibia
- Order: Anura
- Family: Pelodryadidae
- Genus: Spicicalyx
- Species: S. serrata

Binomial name
- Spicicalyx serrata (Andersson, 1916)

Synonyms
- List: Hyla serrata Andersson, 1916; Litoria serrata Cogger, Cameron, and Cogger, 1983; Pengilleyia serrata Wells and Wellington, 1985; Dryopsophus serratus Duellman, Marion, and Hedges, 2016; Ranoidea serrata

= Green-eyed treefrog =

Species of amphibian

The green-eyed tree frog (Spicicalyx serrata) is a species of frog in the subfamily Pelodryadidae that occurs in the Wet Tropics of Australia.

Its natural habitats are subtropical or tropical moist lowland forests, subtropical or tropical moist montane forests, rivers, intermittent rivers, intermittent freshwater marshes, rural gardens, and heavily degraded former forests. It is threatened by habitat loss and chytridiomycosis.

Their diet is carnivorous.

== History ==
Australia is home to almost 230 species of frogs that mainly live in Queensland, a tropical part of Australia. Thousands of years ago, green-eyed treefrogs separated in the northern and southern parts of Queensland and recently started breeding again. However, due to the separation, it is considered cross-breeding, since the species are so different now. Male green-eyed treefrogs from the Northern region in Australia, are rejected by female green-eyed treefrogs from the south. Their geographic separation has caused a change in mating calls, that continues to drive the two types of green-eyed treefrogs apart. If and when the females from the southern region decide to mate with the males from the north, they are re-productively disadvantaged. Their crossbreed offspring don't survive as long as the frogs whose parents breed with other frogs from the same region. Scientists now use the green-eyed treefrog in their studies of speciation and evolution due to the mating habits of the frogs in Australia.

When it comes to monitoring the current population, the best method to use is a photographic identification model, since dorsal patterns of the green-eyed frog is not shown to change over time. To help conserve the green-eyed treefrog population, monitoring and awareness efforts have been increased and an exhibit was created at the Chester Zoo in the United Kingdom. It will be important to keep monitoring the wild population as the species population declines further.

Frogs are born with legs that are good for hopping and special pads on their toes to help them climb. In comparison, toads have shorter legs, drier skin, and are less likely to live near water. Most frogs and toads are responsible for controlling the Earth's insect population, since their diet consists mostly of insects and spiders. However, the green eyed-treefrog is also a carnivore. As a tadpole, the frogs mostly consume algae and plants. Frogs have a moist and permeable skin layer covered with mucous glands, which enables them to breathe through their skin, not just their lungs. The layer of mucus that covers them also acts as a shield, protecting them from scratches. The reason frogs have large and protruding eyes is to make up for their lack of a neck. This eye feature allows them to see everything around them. The color scheme of the green-eyed treefrog is to camouflage them from predators. Frogs with bright colors are alerting predators of their poisonous nature.

== Description ==
Described as Hyla serrata by Andersson in 1916, this species was subsequently brought into synonymy with Litoria genimaculata. In 2010, it was removed from synonymy and is regarded as a separate species from its New Guinea congener. The specific epithet, serrata, refers to the serrated skin flaps that are located along its legs.

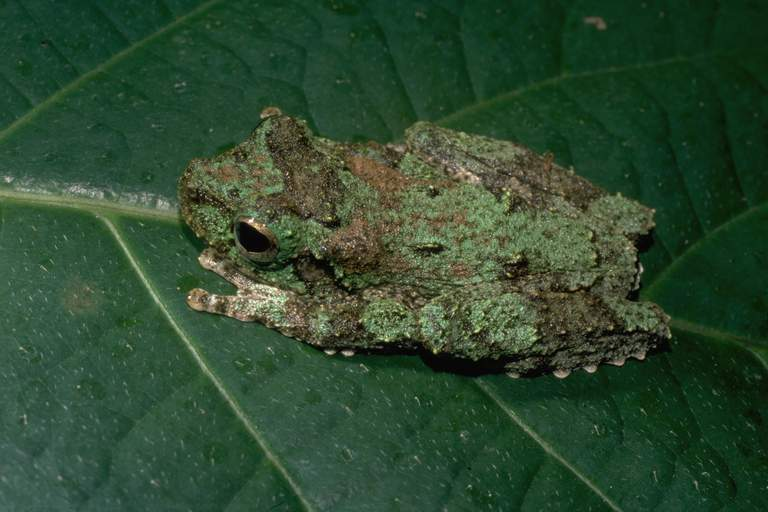
Green-eyed tree frog resting on a leaf.

Coloration is variable. While dark spotting appears to be found on the bottom of all adult green-eyed treefrogs, colors range from bright green to brassy on their upper bodies. The green-eyed treefrog gets its name from the green coloration of the iris.

== Habitat ==
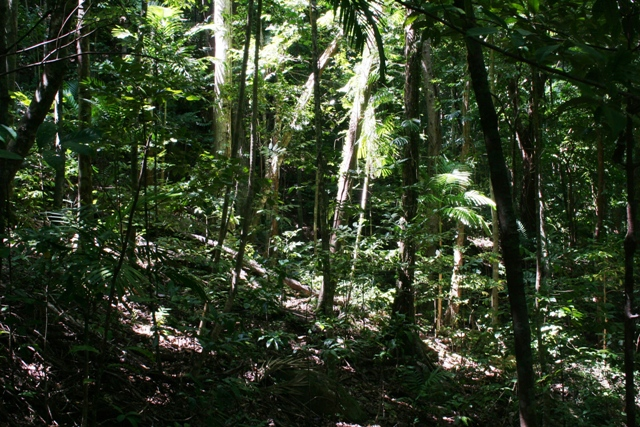
Dunk Island rain forest in Queensland Australia.

The green-eyed treefrog's natural habitats are mainly subtropical, but can also include tropical lowland forests, as well as rivers and freshwater marshes of northern Queensland, Australia. Though their markings correspond with their habitat, their bodies are mostly brownish-green with blotches that are a rust color. Living near creeks and streams, their rust colored blotches tend to match the lichen covered rocks that line the bodies of water.

This particular treefrog is semi-aquatic. Though it mainly prefers dense wood, it also tends to like bodies of water located in clearings or pastures. Adults are also found to be quite active during the day, as well as at night.

== Mating and breeding ==
Due to the males lack of vocal sacs, they have soft mating calls that can only be heard from short distances. Oftentimes the male's mating call can sound like a quiet tapping noise. Being semi-aquatic, green-eyed treefrogs call from vegetation in water and have two types of calls: harsh trill and untrilled. Some males choose to call in groups of a hundred or more and can be found harmonizing at night. During these mating calls, the males are typically located in vegetation in water.

Breeding season occurs during May and July, corresponding with the early rain season, though it has been reported that breeding might occur year-round. Breeding season in Australia starts in August. Most frogs can be found breeding in shallow puddles or ponds, as well as slow-moving waters. The green-eyed treefrog lays its eggs in globular, jelly masses which are measured at around ten centimeters across. In between November and May is when eggs are typically found. These masses, being as large as 843 eggs, are found on vegetation or rocks. Development periods for the tadpoles are often long. On hatching, tadpoles have gills and can be found in the water. As they develop, their legs and arms become prominent features. Once their lungs are developed, they lose their gills.

== Chytridiomycosis ==
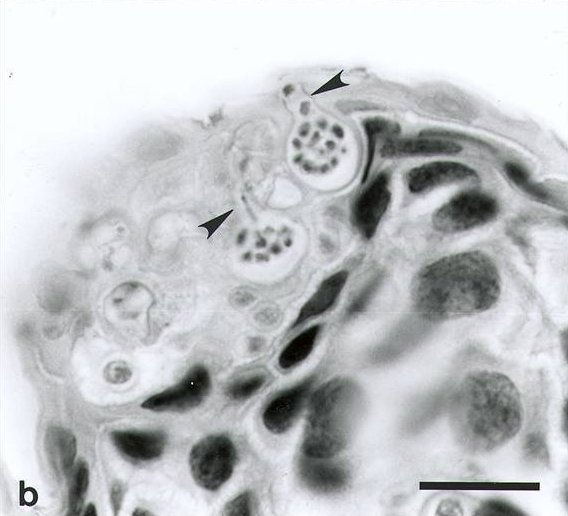
This is what Chytridiomycosis looks like. Created in 1999. The artists are as follows: Peter Daszak, Lee Berger, Andrew A. Cunningham.

Populations of the green-eyed treefrog are largely found in the region's lower elevations between 1,500 and 2,700 meters. It is currently unknown why they have disappeared from high altitude areas. Though the frogs have suffered some decline in past years, which can be blamed on a fungal disease, their numbers have come back stronger. The fungal disease that is believed to be the cause of a decline in the 1990s is called Chytridiomycosis.

An infectious disease that has affected amphibians worldwide, Chytridiomycosis is caused by a fungus that causes sporadic deaths in some amphibian populations, as well as 100% mortality rates in others. This fungus is known as the chytrid fungus. Scientists and researchers believe that this disease has been the main reason for many species extinctions and population decreases among frogs since the 1990s. The main origin of the disease, as well as its true impact are uncertain, but is being continually investigated. Although Chytridiomycosis can be very deadly, the disease is believed to be avoided when under natural and unstressed conditions. Declining species have been found to coexist with non-declining species, possibly due to their differences in behavior. There are other causes of population decline though, including habitat loss, pollution, and climate change. Not to mention, deformities in tadpoles have been linked to agricultural chemicals.

Chytridiomycosis, a fungal disease that is a threat to frogs, is caused by Batrachochytrium dendrobatidis (Bd). Not much is known biologically about Bd, but this fungus can be transported without contact, just by the disease traveling downstream. Batrachochytrium dendrobatidis is the first identified fungal parasite of vertebrates. A tadpole that becomes infected may not grow to full size and may not develop all parts of their mouths. This downstream contraction of the disease is very harmful and the leading cause of what is behind the decline of amphibians worldwide. Besides fungal disease, habitat loss, pollution, and drought have also called amphibian populations to decline. In fact, these factors are causing such a drastic decline that amphibians are more threatened than birds and mammals.

== Endangerment ==
These treefrogs are classified as a least concern species on the IUCN Red List. However, this is based on an earlier taxonomic understanding, in which L. serrata and L. genimaculata were considered synonymous. The species experienced a chytrid-related decline in the 1990s and is classified as vulnerable under the Queensland Government's Nature Conservation (Wildlife) Act 2006.

== Peptides ==
Peptides found within the skin of frogs, including the green-eyed species, are now being looked to for HIV virus prevention. The chemicals found within their skin aren't pleasant for their predators, but can be very useful when fighting against bacteria, viruses, and fungus. When in dendritic cells, it has been found that the virus can still be killed by these peptides, showing a promise for mucosal preventatives. What is needed now, is the identification of which peptides can exactly prevent HIV in order to put this to work.
