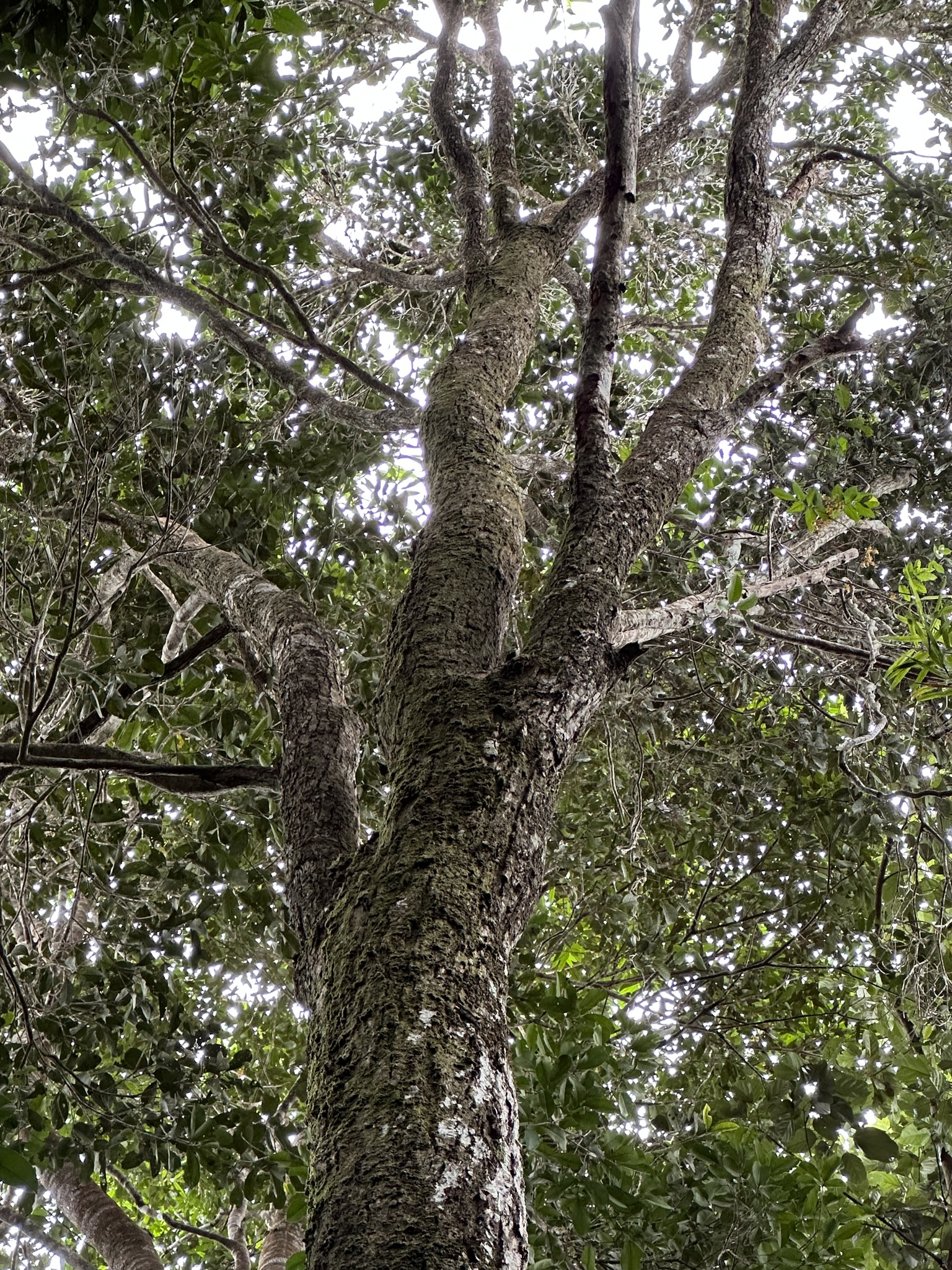

Scientific classification
- Kingdom: Plantae
- Clade: Tracheophytes
- Clade: Angiosperms
- Clade: Eudicots
- Clade: Rosids
- Order: Myrtales
- Family: Myrtaceae
- Genus: Syzygium
- Species: S. kuranda

Binomial name
- Syzygium kuranda (F.M.Bailey) B.Hyland

Synonyms
- Eugenia kuranda

= Syzygium kuranda =

Species of tree

Syzygium kuranda, commonly known as cherry penda, cherry satinash or kuranda satinash, is a tree of the family myrtaceae native to north eastern Queensland.

The tree can grow to 35 metres (115 ft) in height with a trunk that can be 1 metre (3 ft) in diameter. It has simple shiny dark green leaves that are paler on the underside. The leaf blade is lance-like to elliptical in shape narrow at the base and with a blunt point at the tip.

Found in an area along the east coast of Queensland between Cooktown and Tully usually in areas of well established rainforest. It is found from sea level to an altitude of around 1,100 metres (3,609 ft).
