= Kuranda Fig Tree Avenue =

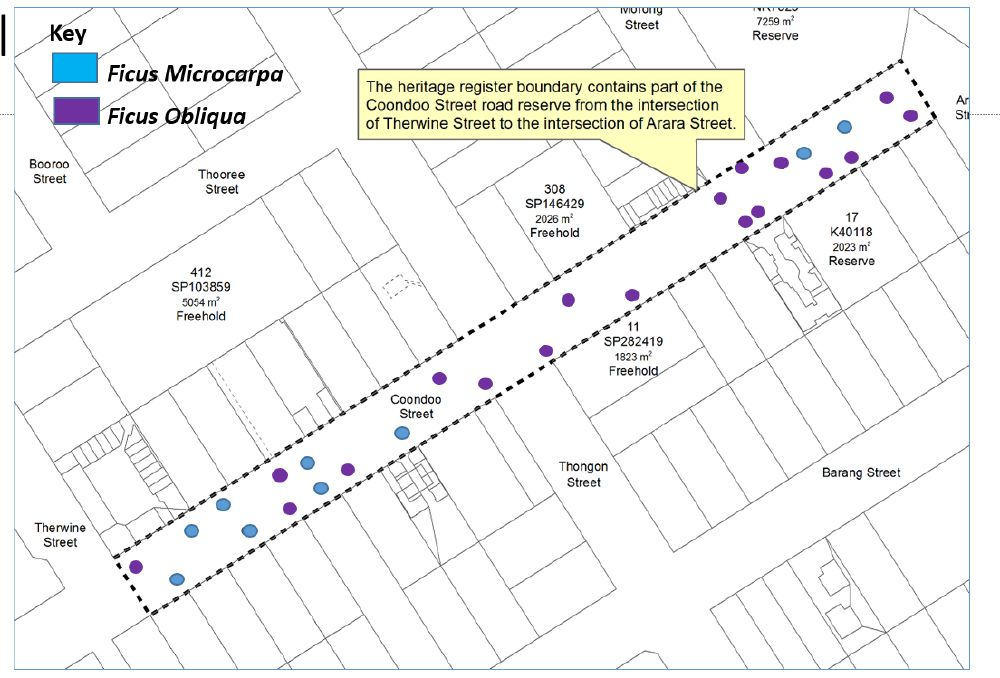
- Species Map, 2018

- Location within Queensland
- 16.8192°S 145.6361°E
- Location: Coondoo Street, Kuranda, Shire of Mareeba, Queensland, Australia

History
- Design period: 1919–1930s (Interwar period)
- Built: 1931

Queensland Heritage Register
- Official name: Kuranda Fig Tree Avenue; Avenue of Ficus Microcarpa and Ficus Obliqua trees
- Type: state heritage
- Designated: 27 July 2018
- Reference no.: 650081
- Type: Parks/Gardens/Trees: Street Plantings
- Theme: Developing secondary and tertiary industries: Catering for tourists

Kuranda Fig Tree Avenue is a heritage-listed avenue of trees at Coondoo Street, Kuranda, Shire of Mareeba, Queensland, Australia. It was built in 1931. It is also known as Avenue of Ficus Microcarpa and Ficus Obliqua trees. It was added to the Queensland Heritage Register on 27 July 2018.

== History ==
Kuranda is a small hinterland town approximately 19 km northwest of Cairns in Far North Queensland. The avenue of mature fig trees which line the main street of Kuranda, Coondoo Street, were planted by the Woothakata Shire Council in the early 1930s to beautify the street and enhance the town's appeal to visitors. The trees were planted at a time when Kuranda was experiencing exceptionally high tourist numbers. Kuranda was, and continues to be, one of Queensland's most popular tourist towns.

Part of the traditional land of the Djabugay speaking people, Kuranda was surveyed in 1888 in anticipation of development which would accompany the arrival of the Cairns-to-Kuranda railway line. Kuranda railway station, situated at the top of the Macalister Range, became the principal station after Cairns when the line opened in 1891 and remained so until the railway extended to Atherton in 1903.

The line encouraged agricultural development and by the 1890s several farms had been established in the area. Large amounts of timber were hewn and provided the early settlers with an income; coffee was grown for a time and there was also dairying and cattle grazing. A small township began to develop close to the railway station and by 1895 was described in the Post Office Directories as the "centre of a large agricultural district with rich alluvial scrub soil. A favourite resort for tourists and others visiting the Barron Falls".

The railway proved to be the impetus for tourism to flourish at Kuranda. Travellers from Brisbane, Sydney and Melbourne came to Cairns by ship and caught the train to Kuranda. The renowned scenic qualities of the railway led to the recognition of the area's tourist potential. Marketed in the south as a winter destination, the tourist season in the Cairns region generally stretched from May to October, which avoided the cyclone season.

Kuranda railway station stood between the Barron River and the small settlement of Kuranda at the rise of the hill and by 1888 the road from the railway station up to the township was called Coondoo Street. This street swiftly became the town's high street. By 1895 Kuranda could boast the railway station, provisional school, butcher, stores and the Kuranda Hotel. In 1910 the small community opened the School of Arts hall in Coondoo Street. From 1920 Kuranda was part of the Woothakata Shire.

By the early 1910s Kuranda had become one of Queensland's most popular tourist attractions, with many visitors arriving by rail daily. The completion of the Brisbane to Cairns railway line in 1924 (called the "Sunshine Route" from 1929) provided another option for reaching Cairns. This also meant an increase in tourist numbers to Kuranda.

The main attraction that brought tourists to Kuranda was the Barron Falls, described as early as 1885, "in flood time the Barron Falls throw even immortal Niagara into the shade". The train line from Cairns to Kuranda took tourists past the falls, where the train would stop and passengers were able to walk along the bridge to view the falls. From here it was only a short 1.5 mile (2.4 km) ride to Kuranda railway station.

Once at Kuranda, several other attractions had been established to take advantage of the flow of tourists; two rainforest parks, the "Fairyland Tea Gardens" (1914) and "The Maze" (1923) were situated across the Barron River where tourists were taken over by punt. Another popular attraction was Frederick Pankhurst Dodd's entomology collection. Popularly called "the Butterfly Man of Kuranda", Dodd began showing his extensive collection of butterflies and insects to the public from his home on Coondoo Street in 1910 for a small fee, leaving visitors "amazed at their wondrous beauty, and altogether at the vastness and variety of the collection placed before us". This collection was to prove to be one of the most important in the country and was donated to the Queensland Museum after Dodd's death in 1937.

A picture theatre opened in 1923 and in 1928 a bridge was built over the Barron River which connected the town with tourist attractions on the other side of the river. In 1926 the Cairns Range Road, renamed Gillies Highway in 1934, was opened, providing vehicle access to Yungaburra and Atherton from Gordonvale. The construction of the Barron Falls Hydro-electric Power Station (1932–35) attracted more tourists and provided the town with electricity.

Seemingly unaffected by the harsh economic climate caused by the Great Depression, visitor numbers to Kuranda peaked in the early 1930s; Kuranda had become the "winter playground of the Southern tourist" with visitors flocking to the small town for either day trips or for longer holidays . In 1932 it was reported that the Queensland Tourist Bureaus in Melbourne and Sydney were experiencing record levels of bookings and the shipping companies conveying the tourists up the coast were also solidly booked. To cater for this demand, the winter tourist season in this year, which usually began in May, was officially started in April.

In the 1920s and 30s a series of promotional booklets were published by the Queensland Government's Tourist Bureau, encouraging southern and overseas visitors to North Queensland. Titles such as 'North Queensland: Australia's Richest Territory', "North Queensland: The Cream of the Continent", "Winter Tours in Queensland" and "Queensland is Different", celebrated the major attractions in the region. As one of the region's most popular tourist destinations at this time, Kuranda was featured widely in these publications. Evocative descriptions of the village included phrases such as "the gardens glitter with colour and brilliancy" and "the varied beauty of the little tourist township among the clouds ... offers a charming introduction to the magnificent scenery on the ... Tablelands".

Adding to this experience was the Kuranda railway station which featured award-winning gardens. By 1931 it had won the annual Queensland Railway Department's station garden competition nine times. The station's reputation as a regular winner also contributed to the town's appeal as a tourist attraction and in 1931 it was stated in the Brisbane Courier "that is why Kuranda railway station is winning for itself a world-wide reputation, which ultimately must benefit Queensland".

Amid this activity, a local councillor, Robert James Bartley, recognised the potential for the main street of Kuranda, Coondoo Street, to be one of the most attractive in the Cairns region. When tourists arrived at Kuranda they were greeted by the stunning gardens of the railway station. As they walked up the hill to Coondoo Street, it was envisaged that this scenic greenery be continued through the small town.

Throughout the 1920s and into the 1930s, principles of town planning, influenced by the "Garden City" and "City Beautiful" movements, began to be adopted by some local councils in Queensland. Street-tree planting was a part of this as a way of enhancing the urban landscape as well as providing shade, particularly in the harsh Queensland summers. The Main Roads Commission envisaged the benefit of planting avenues of trees along main roads across Queensland in the interwar period. The motor car had become more accessible and affordable to many and the potential for the State to benefit from these tourists was recognised by the Commission which implemented a scheme to not only improve the roads, but to also beautify them with street-tree plantings. In North Queensland, trees were planted along the Captain Cook Highway between Cairns and Mossman in the early 1930s. In 1932, the importance of street-tree planting in a town planning context was emphasized in the Architectural and Building Journal of Queensland, which stated "the planting of trees in streets should be vigorously and systematically undertaken, for nothing relieves the often monotony of street lines and gives such a sense of rest and refreshment as the appearance of a beautiful avenue of trees".

In June 1931 The Cairns Post reported that "Mr J. Bartley, Councillor Woothakata Shire, has finalised arrangements for the planting of a row of trees on each side of the main street in Kuranda". The varieties chosen were two types of figs, the small-fruited fig, Ficus microcarpa, and the small-leaved fig, Ficus obliqua. Both varieties were strangler figs. The third variety chosen was the African tulip tree (Spathodea campanulata) due to its floral display when in bloom. These varieties were considered to thrive in a tropical environment such as Kuranda. Frederick Dodd, "the butterfly man of Kuranda", donated the African tulip trees as the flowers were attractive to butterflies.

By July 1931 tree guards and holes for the trees had been installed along Coondoo Street, with the Northern Herald reporting "a further step forward in the beautification of Coondoo Street is the completion of the erection of the tree guards and the digging of holes ready for the planting of the trees". The plantings had been completed by September 1931 and Councillor Bartley was congratulated for his foresight. The trees, planted along the full length of Coondoo Street, between Arara and Therwine streets (430m), thrived in Kuranda's tropical setting. Residents of Kuranda began to complain to the Woothakata Shire Council about the need for the trees to be pruned as they had begun to overhang the footpath and caused pedestrians inconvenience. It was requested that the work be carried out before the start of the tourist season. The work was eventually completed in August 1937.

During World War II organised tours in the Cairns region ceased. Urgent road works had been carried out on the Cairns-to-Kuranda road by mid-1942 to provide decent vehicular access to the Atherton Tableland for the military. Prior to this the road was little more than a rough track. This was to prove to be a boon for Kuranda in the postwar years as it allowed visitors to drive up to the Barron Falls rather than having to rely on the train.

Immediately following the end of the war, Kuranda was once again one of the major tourist attractions in North Queensland. In 1946 it was reported that visitor numbers equalled those of the late 1930s. The Tourist Bureau offered organised tours and in 1949 the "Tropic of Wonderland Tour" was reportedly heavily booked and other tours such as the "Grand Tour" were advertised in full colour advertisements in national magazines such as the Australian Women's Weekly.

It is unclear when the African tulip trees were removed, but this may have been a result of one or numerous cyclones that frequently damaged the township. Several of the trees were also removed for road improvements in 1949. A succession of aerial photographs ranging from the early 1950s to the 1980s demonstrate the trees' strong contribution to the townscape. The trees in the 1950s were clearly large and numerous along both sides of Coondoo Street. By the 1980s through to the late 1990s the figs had matured further and their expansive canopies and large trunks created an impressive tree-scape along the main street.

Visitor numbers to Kuranda by rail reflect the ongoing popularity of the town as a tourist attraction, with 37,350 passengers in 1967, 47,200 in 1970 and 105,316 in 1980. In 1995 a major attraction, the Skyrail Rainforest Cableway, was completed, travelling from Cairns to Kuranda over the rainforest and Barron Falls. The Kuranda terminal is located close by the railway station, ensuring the thousands of visitors to the town continue to walk up the hill and into Coondoo Street via Bartley's tree-lined streetscape.

In the late 1990s Coondoo Street underwent a major revitalisation project by the Mareeba Shire Council. Low stone and concrete walls were constructed around the mature fig trees for protection and aesthetics, a reflection of the value the community and visitors place on the trees. Other landscape features were installed at this time including garden beds, pavement treatment and street furniture.

The Kuranda Fig Tree Avenue, planted in 1931 as a civic beautification scheme by the local authority, retains 27 mature trees. The avenue continues to be an important element of the streetscape, valued by the local residents and visitors alike. The trees contribute to the character and tropical beauty of the street and are often photographed by visiting tourists.

== Description ==
Kuranda is a small town on the Barron River in the Atherton Tableland surrounded by rainforest hinterland approximately 19 km northwest of Cairns in Far North Queensland. The Coondoo Street fig trees span the 430m length of the street between Arara Street and Therwine Street and are located on both sides, forming an impressive avenue effect when viewed along Coondoo Street due to their curtain roots, substantial trunk, and overarching canopies.

There are 27 mature fig trees of the varieties: Ficus microcarpa, the small-fruited fig (9); and Ficus obliqua, the small-leaved fig (18) - refer Boundary Map 2. Both varieties are strangler figs .The trees range in height from 13m to 30m, with the majority reaching close to 20m and above. Many of the trees have extensive aerial roots which stretch from the branches to the ground creating a curtaining effect. The circumferences of the trunks vary, from 2.7m to 19.6m. The canopies of the trees spread out over the street creating a shaded passageway over many sections of the street. The spread of the canopies vary in size from 9m to 26.5m with the majority stretching over 16m.

== Heritage listing ==
Kuranda Fig Tree Avenue was listed on the Queensland Heritage Register on 27 July 2018 having satisfied the following criteria.

The place is important in demonstrating the evolution or pattern of Queensland's history.

The Kuranda Fig Tree Avenue (established 1931) is important in demonstrating the development of tourism in Far North Queensland in the interwar period. Planted to beautify the main street of the town, the avenue illustrates the intention of the local authorities to enhance the tourist experience in Kuranda, which was a major attraction at both a state and national level.

The avenue of fig trees are a good representative example of a civic tree planting scheme of the interwar period, a time when town planning principles were being adopted throughout Queensland by local and state government authorities, in particular the beautification of civic spaces.

The place is important because of its aesthetic significance.

Kuranda Fig Tree Avenue, an avenue of mature fig trees lining the main street of Kuranda, is important for its contribution to the streetscape and for creating a sense of shaded tropical beauty. Intentionally connected to the tropical gardens of the Kuranda railway station, the canopies of the trees create a physical and visual tunnelling effect along many parts of the street and contribute to Kuranda's distinctive tropical character. The expansive trunks of many of the trees and the extensive aerial roots which stretch from the branches to the ground are often photographed by visiting tourists. The avenue of trees is significant for its scenic and landmark qualities.

The place has a strong or special association with a particular community or cultural group for social, cultural or spiritual reasons.

Planted in the early 1930s through the efforts of local council and community benefactors, the avenue of fig trees is valued by residents throughout the Atherton Tablelands and Cairns districts and by the large numbers of visitors to the town as an important signature of the Kuranda townscape. The trees have been valued by the community and visitors since the 1930s.
