= Kuranda, Queensland =

Kuranda
- Town
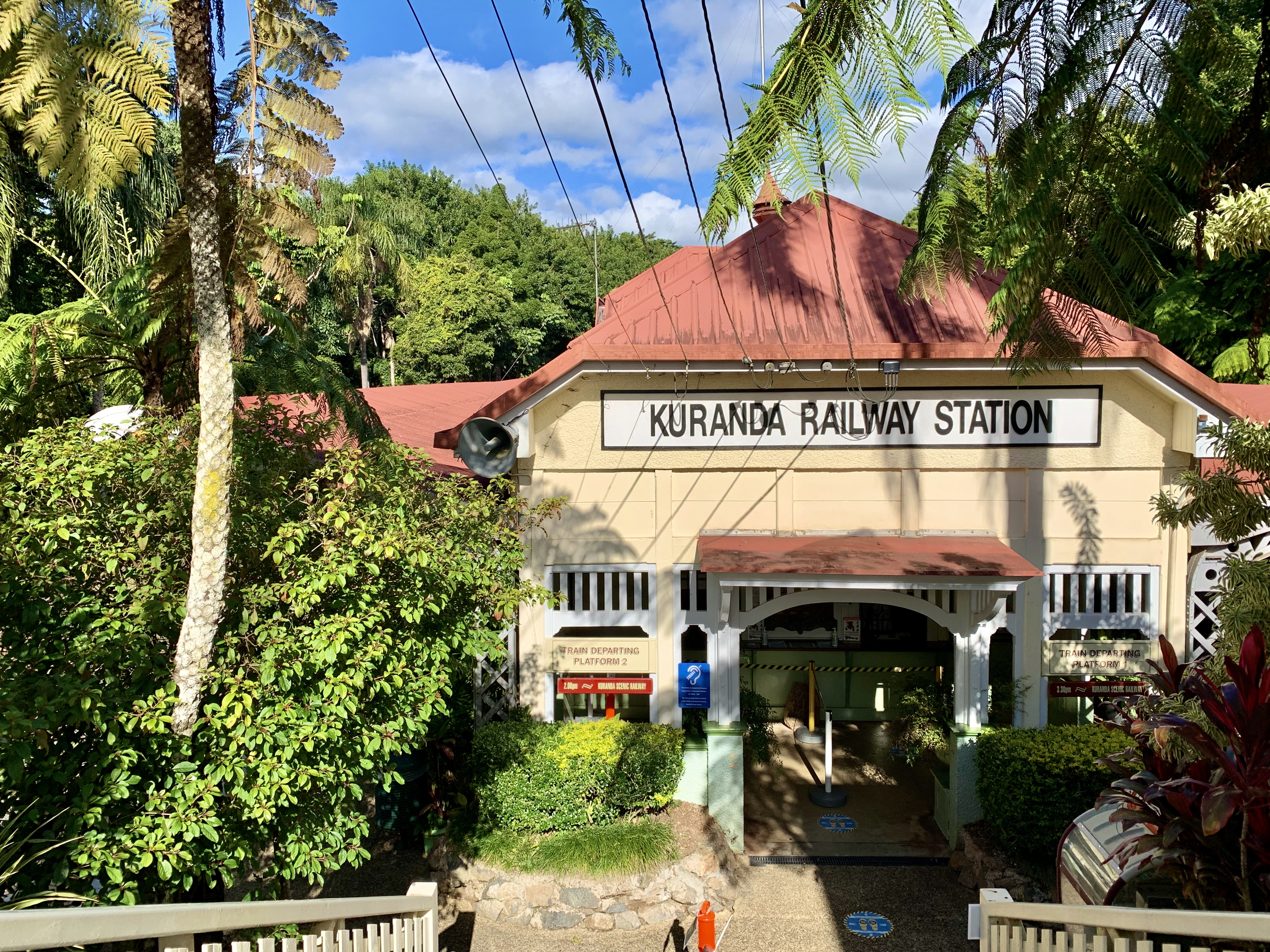
- Kuranda railway station

- Interactive map of Kuranda
- Coordinates: 16.8197°S 145.6369°E
- Country: Australia
- State: Queensland
- LGA: Shire of Mareeba
- Location: 26.7 km (16.6 mi) NW of Cairns; 34.6 km (21.5 mi) NE of Mareeba; 371 km (231 mi) NNW of Townsville; 1,706 km (1,060 mi) NNW of Brisbane
- Established: 1888

Government
  - State electorate: Barron River
  - Federal division: Leichhardt

Area
  - Total: 110.9 km^{2} (42.8 sq mi)
- Elevation: 330 m (1,080 ft)

Population
  - Total: 3,273 (2021 census)
  - Density: 29.513/km^{2} (76.44/sq mi)
- Time zone: UTC+10:00 (AEST)
- Postcode: 4881
Localities around Kuranda
Mona Mona	Mona Mona	Macalister Range
Koah	Kuranda	Macalister Range
Koah	Speewah	Barron Gorge

Kuranda is a rural town and locality on the Atherton Tableland in the Shire of Mareeba, Queensland, Australia. It is 25 kilometres (16 mi) from Cairns, via the Kuranda Range road. It is surrounded by tropical rainforest and adjacent to the Wet Tropics of Queensland World Heritage listed Barron Gorge National Park. In the 2021 census, the locality of Kuranda had a population of 3,273 people.

The town of Myola is also located within the locality of Kuranda (16.8052°S 145.6094°E).

== Geography ==
Kuranda is positioned on the eastern edge of the Atherton Tableland where the Barron River begins a steep descent to its coastal floodplain. The area is an important wildlife corridor between the Daintree/Carbine Tableland area in the north and Lamb Range/Atherton Tableland in the south, two centres of biodiversity.

Parts of Kuranda, particularly along its eastern edge, are protected within the Kuranda National Park and Barron Gorge National Park. Both national parks belong to the Wet Tropics World Heritage Area. Barron Gorge Forest Reserve and Formatine Forest Reserve have been established in the south of Kuranda. Closer to the centre of the town is Jumrum Creek Conservation Park where a near threatened, endemic frog species Ranoidea myola is protected. An elongated dam created by a weir built for a power station was constructed in 1935 and is used to today for recreation.

Myola is in the north of the locality beside the Barron River, upstream from the town of Kuranda.

The climate of Kuranda is tropical rainforest climate.

Kuranda, Queensland

Climate chart (precipitation, max. and min. temperature)
J	F	M	A	M	J	J	A	S	O	N	D
399 29 22	427 29 22	358 29 21	216 27 20	91 26 18	44 24 16	33 24 15	28 25 15	31 26 17	52 28 19	92 29 20	197 29 21
- █ Average max. and min. temperatures in °C
- █ Precipitation totals in mm
Imperial conversion
J	F	M	A	M	J	J	A	S	O	N	D
16 84 72	17 84 72	14 84 70	8.5 81 68	3.6 79 64	1.7 75 61	1.3 75 59	1.1 77 59	1.2 79 63	2.1 82 66	3.6 84 68	7.7 84 70
- █ Average max. and min. temperatures in °F
- █ Precipitation totals in inches

== History ==
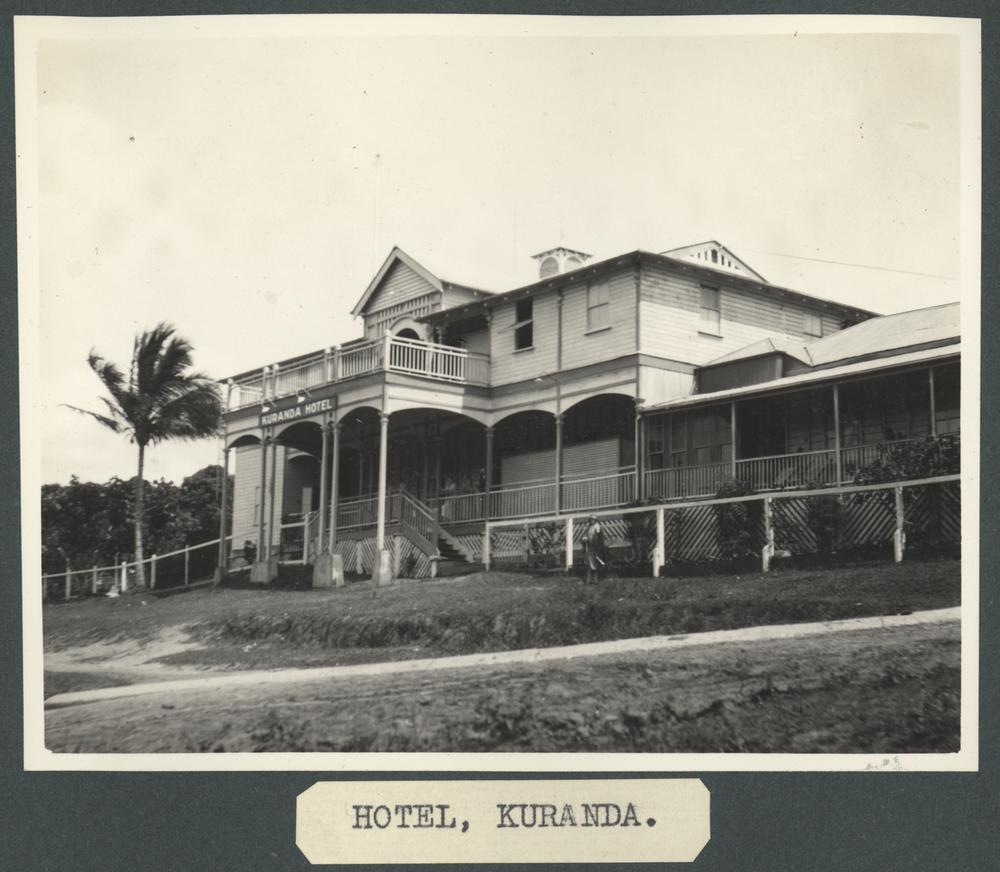
Kuranda Hotel, circa 1928

The rainforest around Kuranda has been home to the Djabugay people for over 10,000 years. Europeans began to explore and develop the area from the nineteenth century. The Speewah massacre occurred in 1890, when settler John Atherton sent native troopers as revenge for the death of a bullock.

The name Kuranda is derived from Yindinji word, kuran referring to the acorn leafed plant (Helmholtzia acorifolia).

Djabugay (also known as Djabuganjdji, Tjupakai) is a language of Far North Queensland, particularly the area around the Kuranda Range and Barron River Catchment. The Djabugay language region includes the landscape within the local government boundaries of Cairns Regional Council.

The name Myola comes from its railway station, which was named on 15 December 1891 by the Queensland Railways Department using an Aboriginal word indicating main camp or elders' camp.

Kuranda was first settled in 1885 and surveyed by Thomas Behan in 1888. Construction of the railway from Cairns to Myola (later Cairns to Herberton) began in 1887 and the line reached Kuranda in 1891. The current railway station was completed in 1915.

Kuranda Post Office opened on 25 June 1891 (a Middle Crossing receiving office had been open from 1888).

Kuranda State School opened on 24 October 1892. It was renamed Kuranda District State School on 8 July 2002. It was at 14-22 Arara Street (16.8218°S 145.6396°E). In 2007, it was amalgamated with Kuranda District State High School to create Kuranda District State College at the Myola site. Kuranda District State School's website was archived. The Arara Street site was purchased by the Mareeba Shire Council (now the Tablelands Regional Council) to redevelop as community facilities.

Between 1912 and 1913 Eric Mjöberg lead an expedition to Queensland in which the Kuranda Aboriginal people were observed.

Although coffee was grown around Kuranda in the early twentieth century, timber was the town's primary industry for a number of years. Kuranda has been known as a tourist destination since the early 1900s. It was both the rainforest and local Aboriginal culture which attracted people to the area.

St Saviour's Anglican Church was built in 1915. Its colourful glass windows were added in 2002.

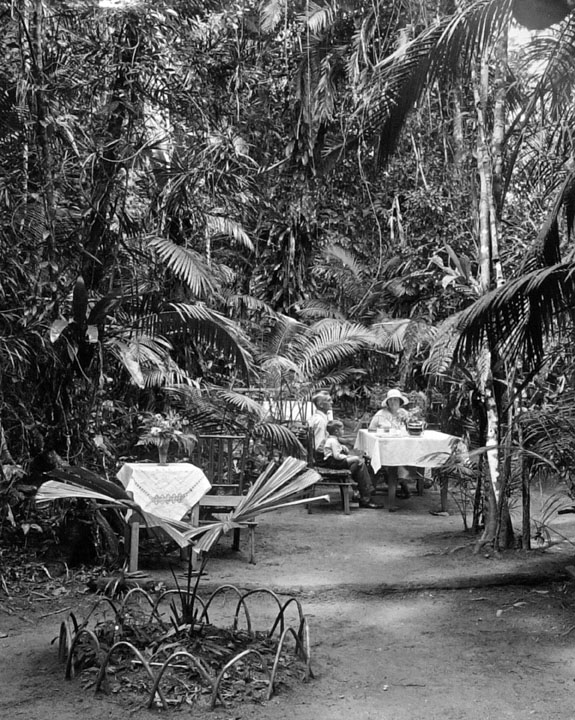
Fairyland Tea Gardens, circa 1935

In the 1930s, the Fairyland Tea Gardens were developed as a tourist attraction to experience the local rainforest.

Clohesy River Provisional School opened on 21 August 1933 and closed in 1939.

The Barron Gorge Hydroelectric Power Station was built nearby in the 1960s.

From the 1970s onwards, Kuranda promoted itself as the 'village in the rainforest'. The concept served two purposes. It attracted those seeking a bohemian enclave in which to reside as well as a being a tourist promotional strategy. Throughout the 1970s and 1980s Kuranda was popular with alternative lifestylers, a theme that still runs through the local community today. Tourism became the backbone of the local economy.

Kuranda Library opened in 1996 and underwent a major refurbishment in 2015.

Kuranda State High School opened on 22 January 1998 at 260 Myola Road in Myola. In 2007, Kuranda District State School and Kuranda State High School amalgamated to form Kuranda District State College, by expanding the Kuranda State High School site at Myola. Kuranda State High School's website was archived.

Cairns Rudolf Steiner School opened on 29 January 2002 in Stratford in Cairns. It subsequently relocated to Kuranda and was renamed Cairns Hinterland Steiner School.

Although historically and currently Kuranda is in the Shire of Mareeba, following a rationalisation of local government areas, between 2008 and 2013 all of the Shire of Mareeba was within the Tablelands Region. This decision was unpopular with the residents of the shire and was reversed following a vote by residents with the reinstatement of the Shire of Mareeba on 1 January 2014.

In recent times, Kuranda remains a sleepy little tourist town, renowned for its arts and souvenir shops.

== Demographics ==
In the 2011 census, the locality of Kuranda had a population of 2,966 people.

In the 2016 census, the locality of Kuranda had a population of 3,008 people. Aboriginal and Torres Strait Islander people made up 14.9% of the population. 67.0% of people were born in Australia. The next most common country of birth was England at 5.7%. 80.4% of people spoke only English at home. The most common response for religion was No Religion at 39.2%.

In the 2021 census, the locality of Kuranda had a population of 3,273 people.

== Heritage listings ==
Kuranda has a number of heritage-listed sites:

- Cairns-to-Kuranda railway line (operated as the Kuranda Scenic Railway) including the Kuranda railway station
- Kuranda Fig Tree Avenue, Coondoo Street (16.8192°S 145.6361°E)

== Amenities ==
Mareeba Shire Council operate a public library in Kuranda at 18-22 Arara Street (16.8219°S 145.6399°E).

The Kuranda Historical Society was established in 2017 and seeks to collect and display items of historical interest relating to the Kuranda area.

The Kuranda Media Association publish a monthly newspaper called "The Kuranda Paper".

The Kuranda branch of the Queensland Country Women's Association meets at the CWA Hall on the corner of Barang Street and Thongon Street.

St Christopher's Catholic Church is at 20 Barang Street. It is within the Kuranda Parish of the Roman Catholic Diocese of Cairns and is administered from the Atherton Parish.

== Education ==
Kuranda District State College is a government primary and secondary (Prep–12) school for boys and girls at 260 Myola Road (16.8044°S 145.6174°E). In 2017, the school had an enrolment of 366 students with 37 teachers (33 full-time equivalent) and 32 non-teaching staff (21 full-time equivalent). It has a special education program.

Cairns Hinterland Steiner School is a private primary and secondary (Prep–11) school for boys and girls at 46 Boyles Road (16.8124°S 145.5885°E). In 2017, the school had an enrolment of 165 students with 18 teachers (17 full-time equivalent) and 17 non-teaching staff (11 full-time equivalent).

== Fauna ==
The nocturnal frog species Litoria myola is only found in the vicinity of a few creeks near Kuranda. Fauna in the area include Australia's largest species of mantids, phasmids, spiders, moths and butterflies.

== Attractions ==
The Skyrail Rainforest Cableway is a 7.5-kilometre (4.7 mi) scenic tourist cableway running above the Barron Gorge National Park in the Wet Tropics of Queensland’s World Heritage Area, one of the oldest tropical rainforests in the world. It operates from the Kuranda terminal at 4 Arara Street (16.8190°S 145.639000°E) to the Smithfield terminal in Cairns.

The Kuranda Scenic Railway is a 37-kilometre (23 mi) scenic tourist railway journey through the Barron Gorge National Park from the Kuranda railway station (16.8185°S 145.6389°E) to the Cairns railway station. A popular day trip from Cairns is the combined railway-and-cableway round trip to Kuranda.

Coondoo Street is Kuranda's main street with shops, galleries and various old and shadowy trees. St. Saviour's Anglican Church at 7 Coondoo Street (16.8197°S 145.6349°E) is known for its colourful glass windows. The gardens surrounding St Christopher's Catholic Church in Barang Street and the Seventh Day Adventist Church in Barron Falls Road are good locations to observe tropical birds. In the northern part of Kuranda close to Therwine Street a Japanese plane wreck can be seen in the bushes.

The Kuranda Koala Garden is a small local wildlife park which keeps koalas, wombats, kangaroos, wallabies, pademelons, bettongs, potoroos, bilbies, bandicoots, possums, gliders, frogmouth owls, freshwater crocodiles, lizards, pythons, turtles and frogs.

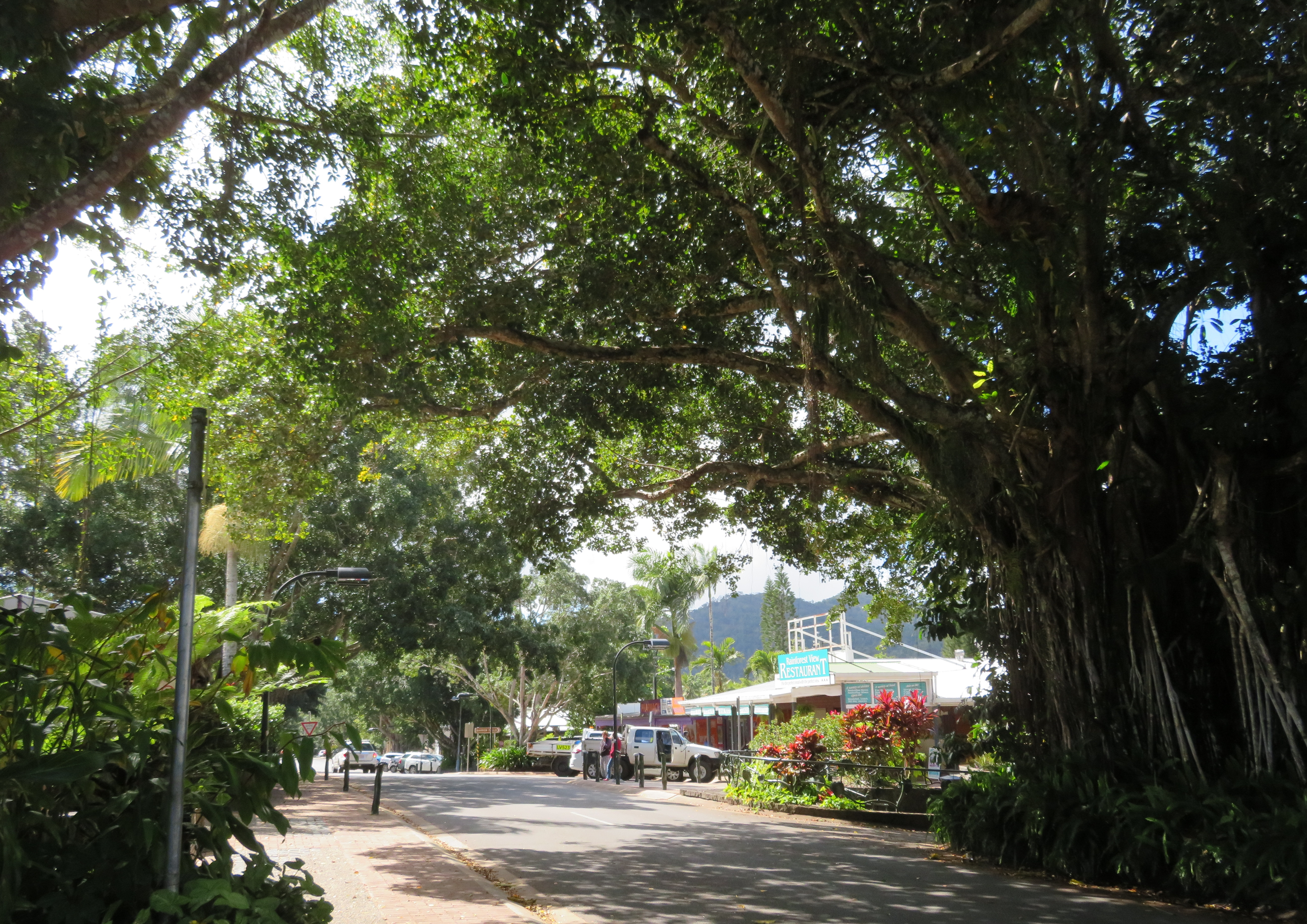
Coondoo Street

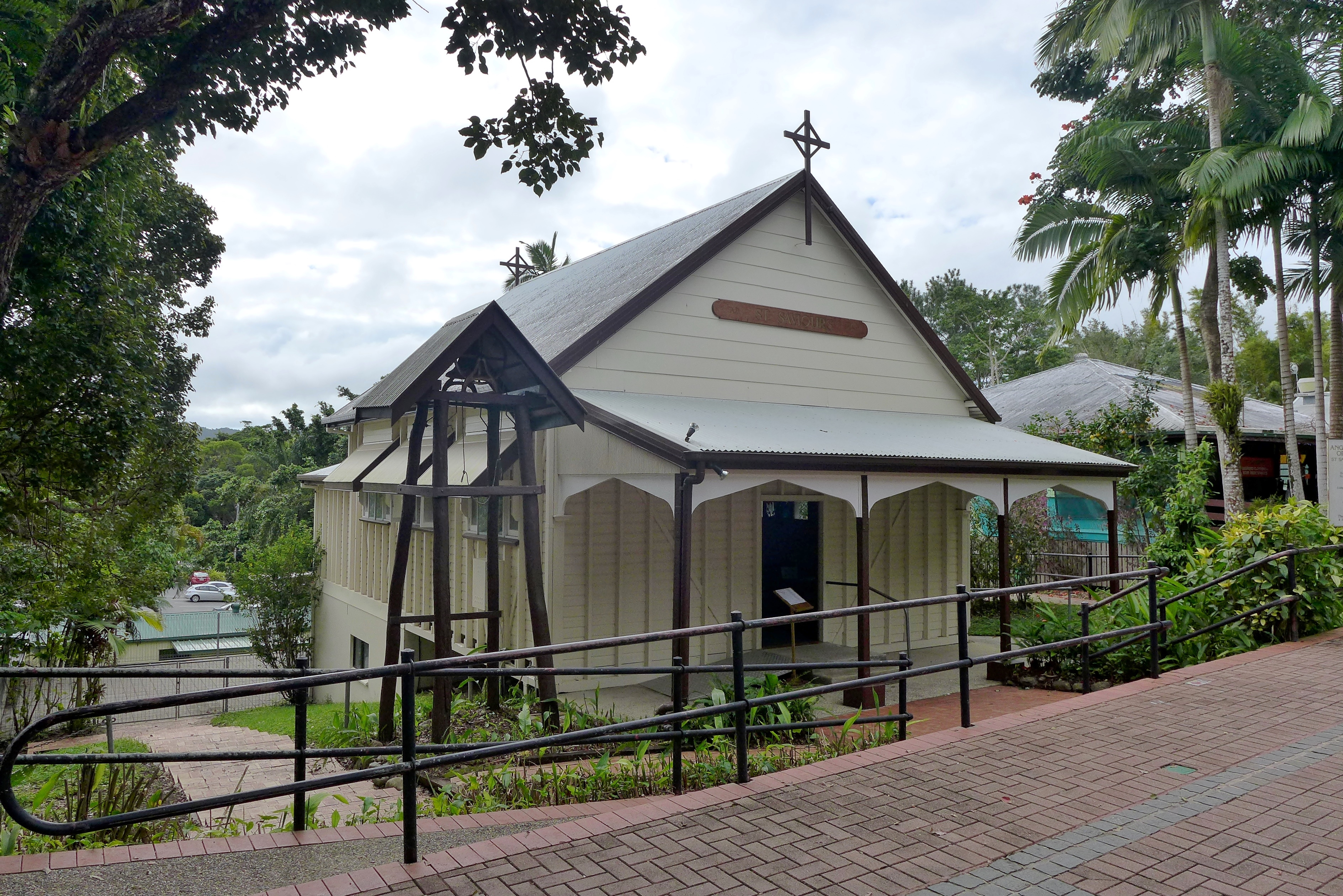
St. Saviour's Church

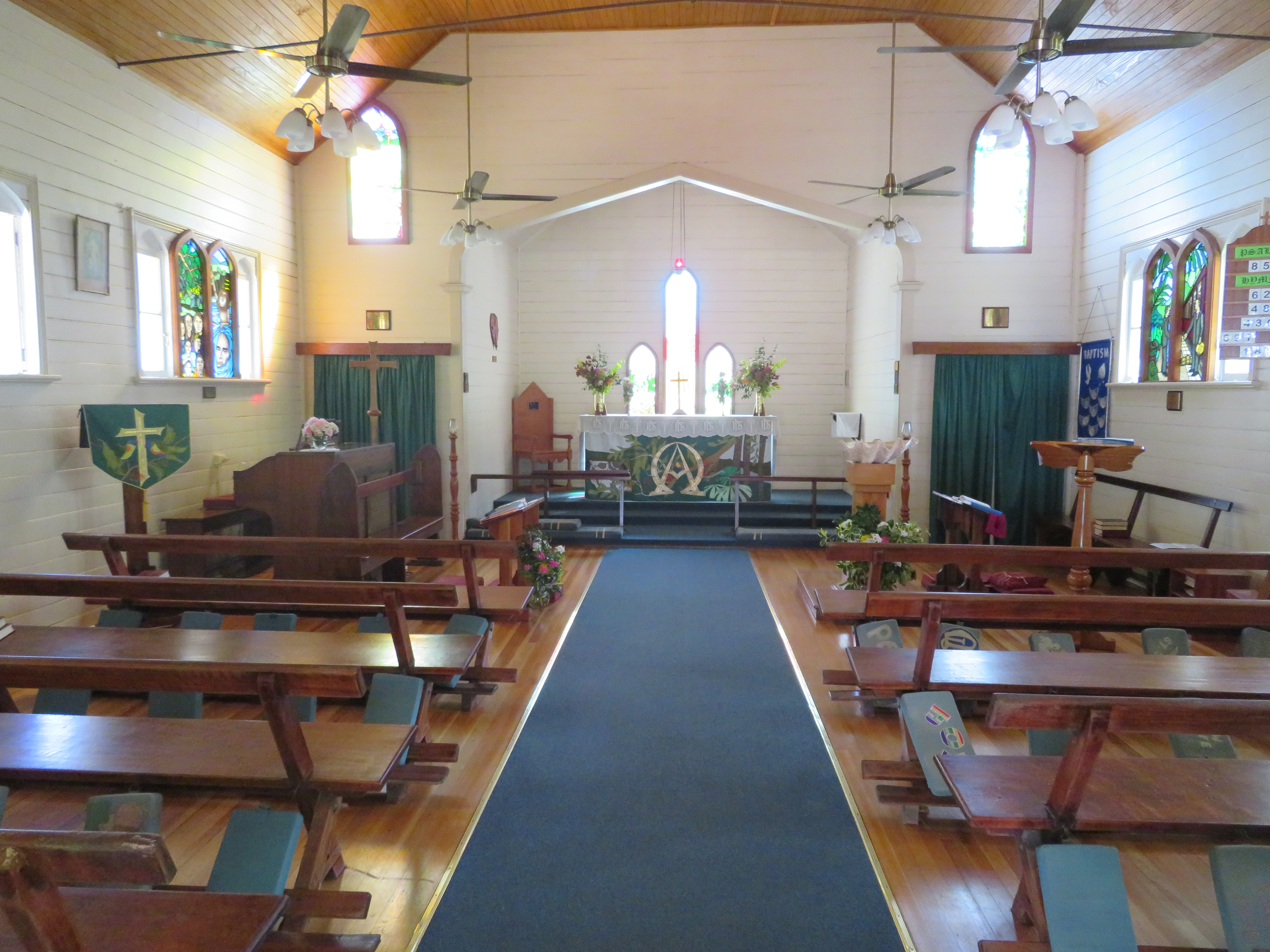
St. Saviour's Church

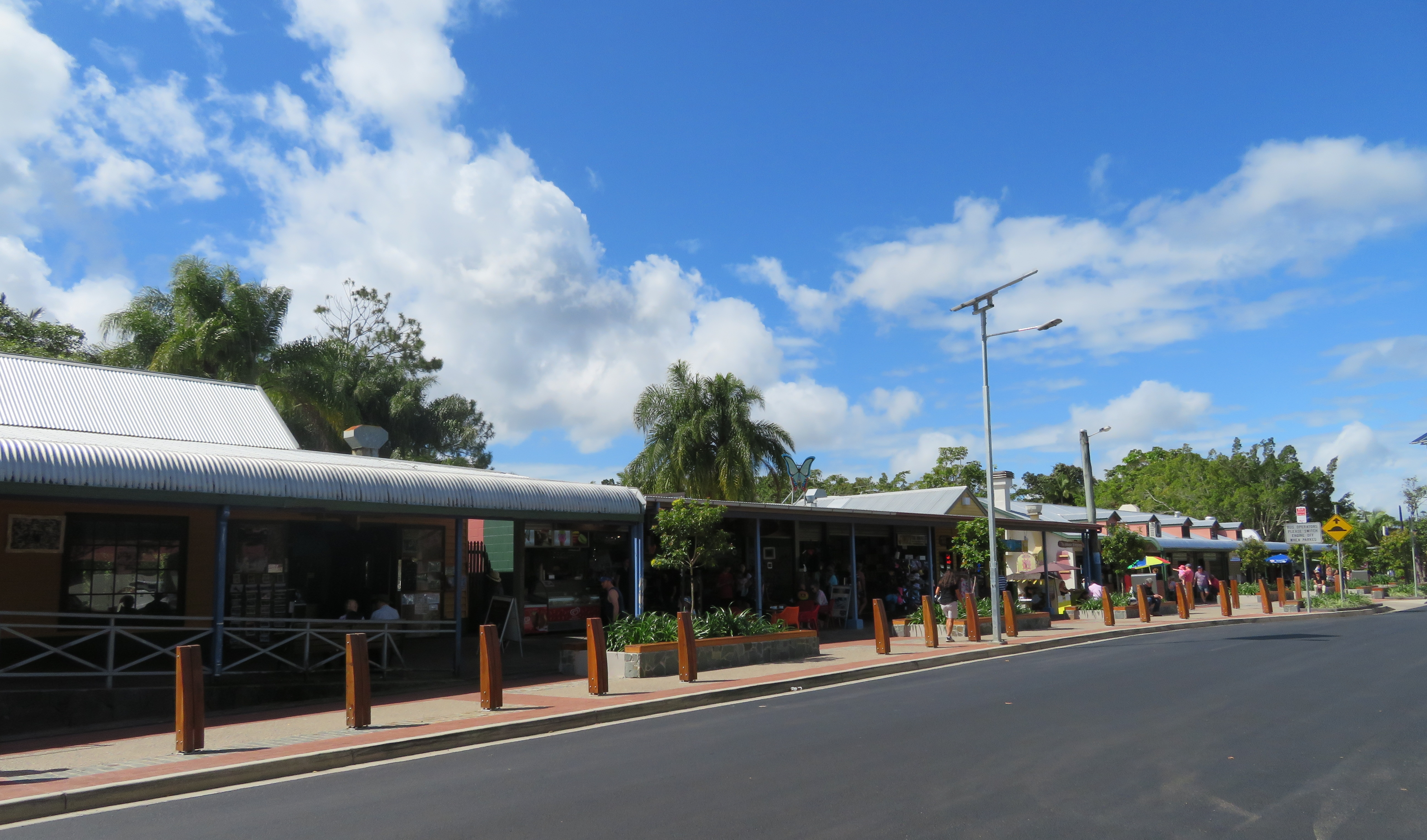
Therwine Street

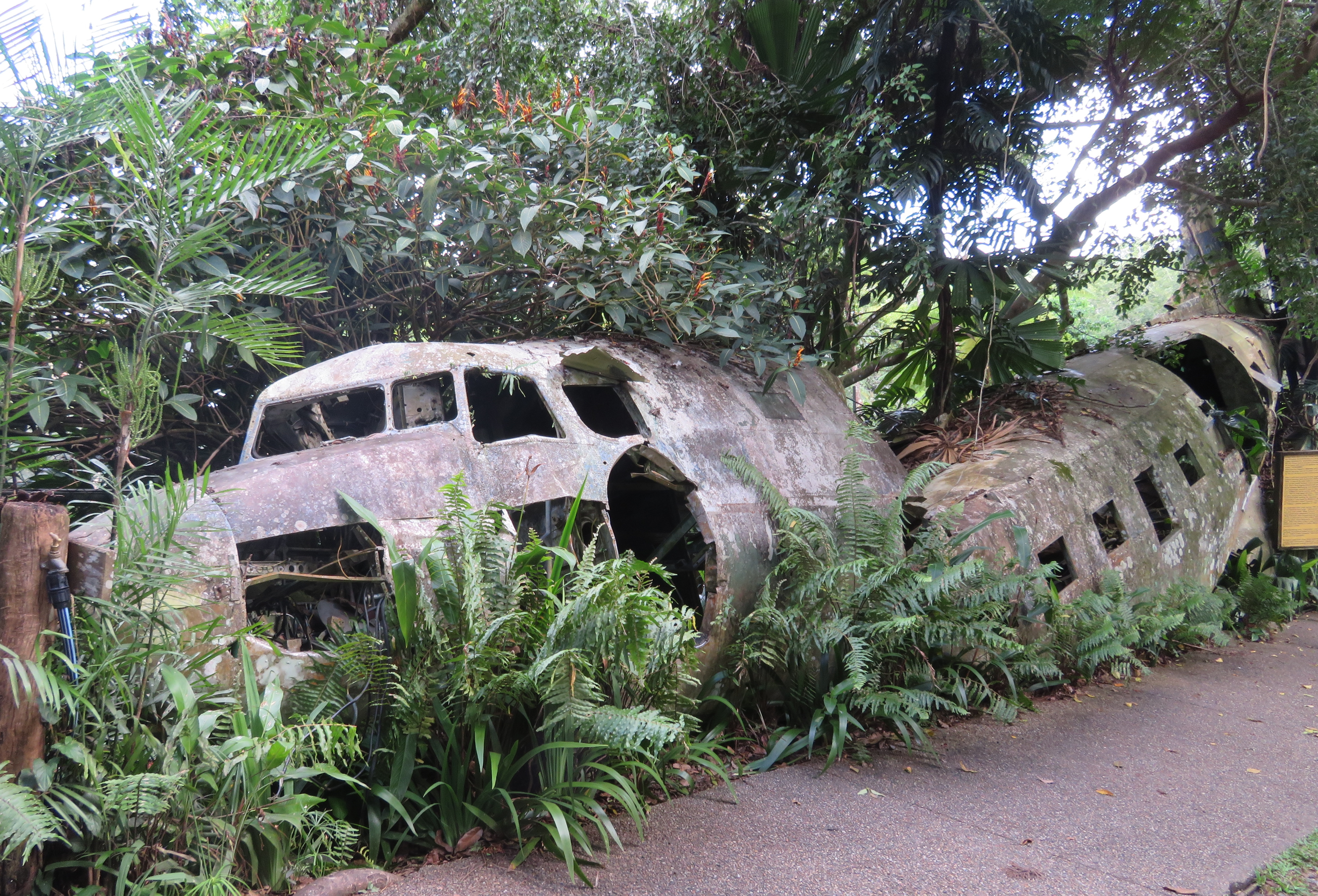
Japanese plane wreck

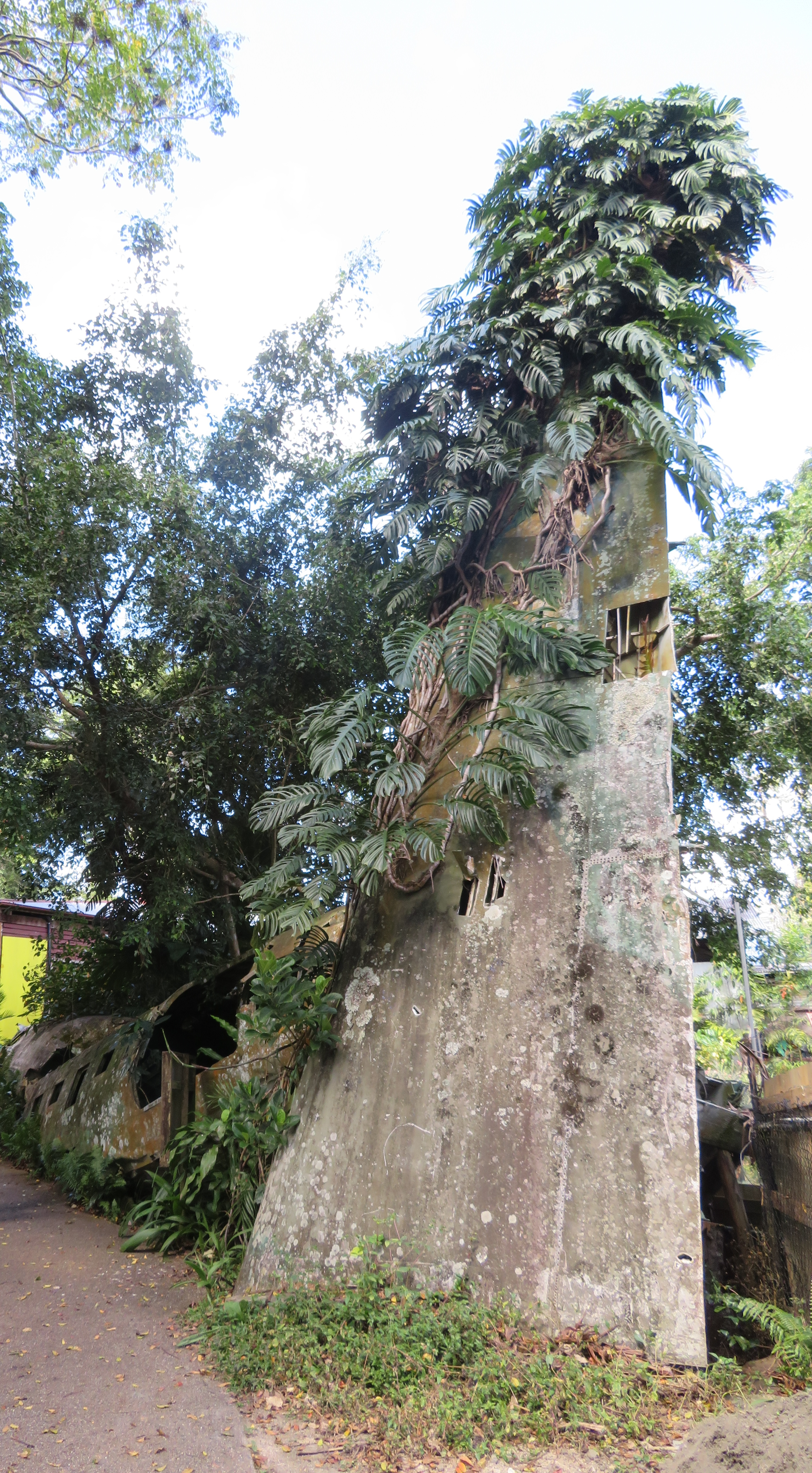
Japanese plane wreck

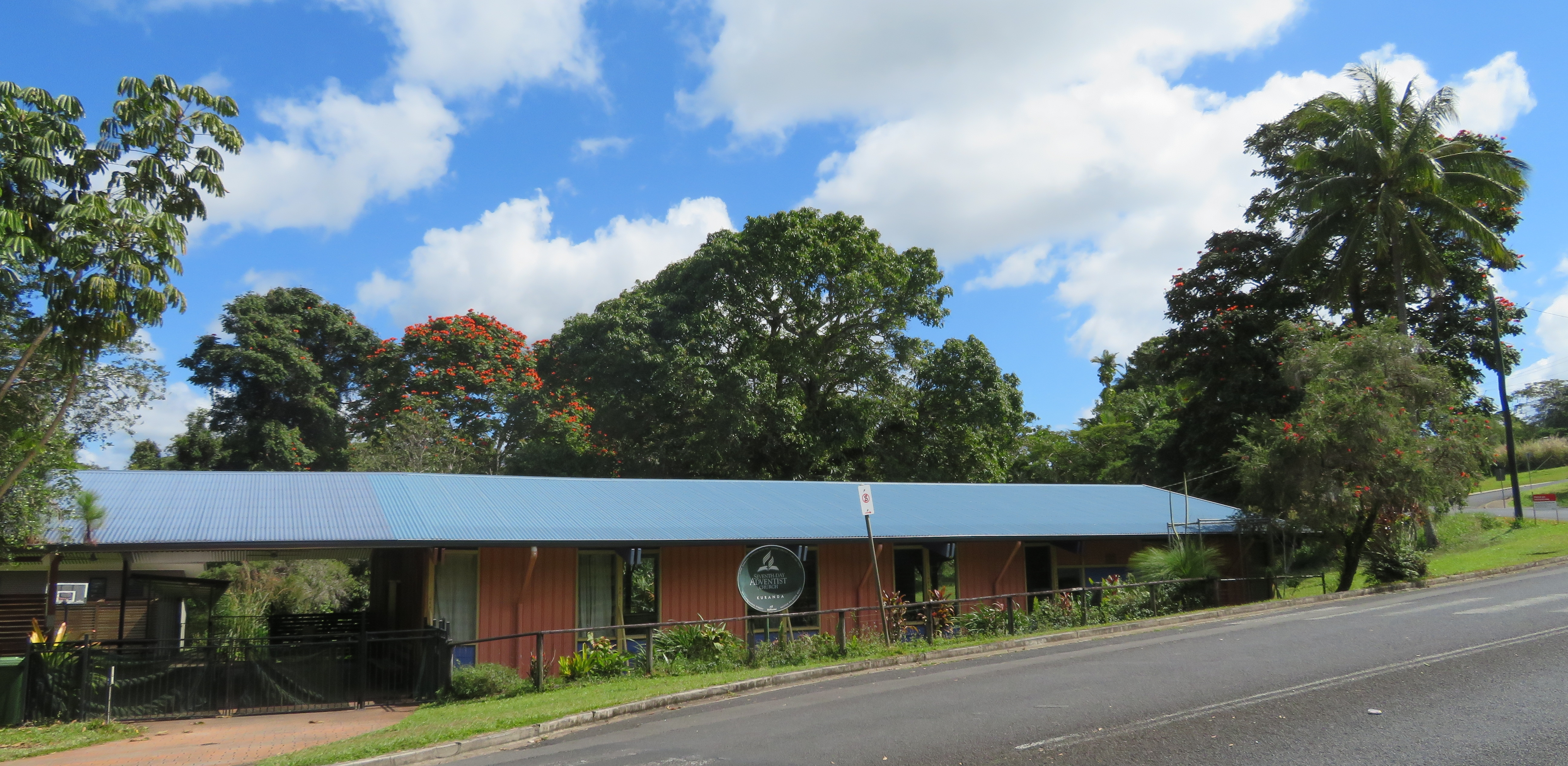
Adventist Church
