= List of The Crocodile Hunter episodes =

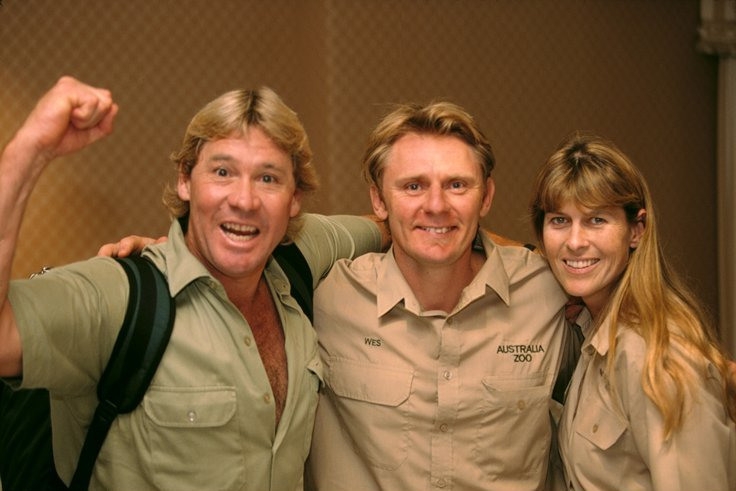
The cast of The Crocodile Hunter.

The Crocodile Hunter is a wildlife documentary television series that was hosted by Steve Irwin and his wife, Terri. The series became popular due to Irwin's unconventional method and hands-on approach to nature.

The two-hour pilot episode, filmed in 1992, premiered in New Zealand over two parts on 8 and 15 August 1993 and on American cable television network, Discovery Channel in October 1996, followed by the official series premiere on Animal Planet on 5 April 1997. The series ended on 18 June 2004, two years before Irwin's death. 13 specials were broadcast between 1 January 1997 and 4 September 2007.

== Series overview ==
Series	Episodes	Originally released	
Series	Episodes	First released	Last released
Pilot		25 October 1996	
1	8	5 April 1997	24 May 1997
2	10	8 March 1998	22 November 1998
3	16	4 September 1999	24 June 2000
4	18	19 November 2000	10 August 2002
5	12	20 November 2002	18 June 2004
Specials	13	1 January 1997	4 September 2007

== Episodes ==
=== Pilot (1996) ===
Title	Directed by	Written by	Original release date
"Pilot"	John Stainton	Todd Levi	25 October 1996 (Discovery Channel)
Filmed in 1992. Steve Irwin and his wife, Terri Raines Irwin, spend their honeymoon trapping and rescuing crocodiles in Australia. Animals are alligator snapping turtle, American alligator, Eastern grey kangaroo, freshwater crocodile and red-bellied black snake. Note: This pilot was first broadcast on Discovery Channel as a two-hour special, but in later reruns on Animal Planet, it was divided into two separate episodes.

=== Season 1 (1997) ===
No. overall	Title	Directed by	Written by	Original release date
1	"Wild in the USA"	John Stainton	Grant Dowling	5 April 1997
Steve follows Terri to her home state of Oregon, and to New York, to watch beavers and raccoons. Steve also helps Terri to relocate her pet cougar, Malina.
2	"Dinosaurs Down Under"	John Stainton	Grant Dowling	12 April 1997
Steve and Terri trace the history of Australia's dinosaurs.
3	"Sleeping with Crocodiles"	John Stainton	Grant Dowling	19 April 1997
Steve takes viewers behind the scenes at the Queensland Reptile and Fauna Park (now Australia Zoo) in Australia. The work at the park includes relocation of giant boas and healthcare for alligators.
4	"Suburban Killers"	John Stainton	Grant Dowling	26 April 1997
Not all dangerous creatures live out in the wilderness of the forests, the jungles and the Outback. Some of them live in the homes of suburbanites in Australia. Steve examines some of the venomous snakes and spiders that can make unwelcome appearances in suburbia.
5	"Dangerous Animals"	John Stainton	Grant Dowling	3 May 1997
Steve and Terri venture across the United States of America, seeking out deadly scorpions, venomous snakes and toxic spiders.
6	"Travelling the Dingo Fence"	John Stainton	Grant Dowling	10 May 1997
The Dingo Fence in southern Queensland, is part of the world's longest fence (over 3300 miles long), built to keep dingoes out of southern Queensland and away from the sheep flocks. Steve observes boars, snakes and dingoes in the Outback. Note: This episode originally aired as a two-hour special, but in later reruns, it was divided into two separate episodes.
7	"Hidden River"	John Stainton	Grant Dowling	17 May 1997
Steve attempts to rescue a turtle in a river despite the presence of crocodiles.
8	"Elephants and Orange People"	John Stainton	Grant Dowling	24 May 1997
Steve encounters orangutans and Asian elephants in Sumatra.

=== Season 2 (1998) ===
No. overall	Title	Directed by	Written by	Original release date
9	"Return to the Wild"	John Stainton	Grant Dowling	8 March 1998
Steve returns to his roots as he captures and relocates a 14-foot crocodile named Nobby away from a busy waterway in Australia.
10	"Outlaws of the Outback: Part 1"	John Stainton	Grant Dowling	15 March 1998
Steve takes a look at the serious problem of the introduction of non-native species to Australia. The new species can crowd out the native animals. In Australia, the vast majority of animals are endemic to the continent. Steve also shows a roundup of wild camels.
11	"Outlaws of the Outback: Part 2"	John Stainton	Grant Dowling	22 March 1998
Steve continues his examination of non-indigenous animal species that threaten to crowd out native Australian animals.
12	"Island of Time"	John Stainton	Grant Dowling	29 March 1998
Beautiful scenery and adventure are encountered during Steve and Terri's visit to the isolated inhabitants of the world's largest sand island.
13	"Reptiles of the Deep: Turtles"	John Stainton	Grant Dowling	5 April 1998
Green and loggerhead sea turtles lay their eggs on the land. The hatchlings face enormous obstacles to get to the ocean. Steve films the struggle and shows an annual scientific survey of the turtles off the east coast of Australia.
14	"Where the Devils Run Wild"	John Stainton	Grant Dowling	12 April 1998
Steve and Terri seek the Tasmanian tiger, thought to be extinct since the 1930s, as well as Tasmanian devils, copperhead snakes, black-faced shags, pademelon joeys and wombats.
15	"Last Waterholes of the Outback"	John Stainton	Grant Dowling	16 August 1998
Steve travels to the Australian Outback to show us the last remaining major sources of water in this dry area. Animals are saltwater crocodile, freshwater crocodile, brown tree snake, tick, frill neck lizard, cattle and kangaroo.
16	"The Crocodile Hunter Goes West"	John Stainton	Grant Dowling	23 August 1998
Steve and Terri head out west in a quest to find a mate for a goanna lizard at Australia Zoo.
17	"Freshwater Crocs"	John Stainton	Grant Dowling	4 October 1998
Steve gives the viewers a look at freshwater crocodiles.
18	"Sharks Outside the Cage"	John Stainton	Grant Dowling	22 November 1998
Steve studies some of the more placid and harmless sharks living in the waters around Australia.

=== Season 3 (1999–2000) ===
No. overall	Title	Directed by	Written by	Original release date
19	"Legends of the Galapagos"	John Stainton	Grant Dowling	4 September 1999
Steve and Terri study the Galapagos on their 168-year-old tortoise's birthday.
20	"America's Deadliest Snakes"	John Stainton	Grant Dowling	5 September 1999
Steve travels to the United States where he researches the remarkable rattlesnakes, the most venomous serpents of all, to show how placid they can be when unprovoked. In Florida, he finds snakes as diverse as the pygmy rattler and eastern diamondbacks. He also has a close encounter with timber rattlers in Virginia.
21	"Reptiles of the Deep: Sea Snakes"	John Stainton	Grant Dowling	6 September 1999
Steve films the deadly sea snake in its underwater environment.
22	"Reptiles of the Deep: Saurians"	John Stainton	Grant Dowling	7 September 1999
Reptiles still living in the sea include saltwater crocodiles and lizards that can dive deep.
23	"Steve and the Dragon"	John Stainton	Grant Dowling	8 September 1999
Steve ventures to the remote part of the Indonesian islands to observe the largest lizard in the world, the Komodo dragon. Animals are Komodo dragon, gecko, golden tree snake, monkey, water buffalo, Russell's viper, and orange-footed scrubfowl.
24	"Australia's Wild Frontier"	John Stainton	Grant Dowling	9 September 1999
Steve travels to Queensland's Cape York, which is considered one of the last wild frontiers of Australia.
25	"Faces in the Forest"	John Stainton	Grant Dowling	10 September 1999
Falling in love with the orangutans of Sumatra, Steve assists them in their rehabilitation process.
26	"Steve's Story"	John Stainton	Grant Dowling	11 October 1999 (one-hour version)
26	"Steve's Story"	John Stainton	Grant Dowling	22 September 2001 (90-minute version) (Discovery Channel)
Interviews with Steve, Terri, his father Bob, his mother Lyn, and some of his friends, as they reveal the man behind the adventure series.
27	"Steve's Most Dangerous Adventures"	John Stainton	Grant Dowling	11 October 1999 (one-hour version)
27	"Steve's Most Dangerous Adventures"	John Stainton	Grant Dowling	12 March 2002 (two-hour version)
Steve looks back on his most dangerous encounters, including those with Komodo dragons, various crocodiles and venomous snakes.
28	"Steve's Greatest Crocodile Captures"	John Stainton	Grant Dowling	18 June 2000 (one-hour version)
28	"Steve's Greatest Crocodile Captures"	John Stainton	Grant Dowling	12 March 2002 (two-hour version)
Steve's greatest crocodile captures are shown in this episode. Steve and Terri also review the proper methods to use in such captures.
29	"Wild River of Africa"	John Stainton	Grant Dowling	19 June 2000
The Luangwa River in Zambia includes hippos, Nile crocodiles and monitor lizards among its residents. Steve witnesses a crocodile feeding frenzy.
30	"A Handful of Elephants"	John Stainton	Grant Dowling	20 June 2000
Steve tracks wild elephants in Sumatra, crocodiles, Asian water monitors and wild boars.
31	"Jungle in the Clouds"	John Stainton	Grant Dowling	21 June 2000
Steve journeys through the wilderness of New Guinea, moving through the mangroves of the coast, jungles on the lowland plains, valleys, and mountains toward his destination: a rare equatorial glacier. He examines wildlife large and small all along his route.
32	"Wildest Baby Animal Videos"	John Stainton	Grant Dowling	22 June 2000
Steve and Terri visit the small, cute and entertaining world of baby animals, including possums, bears, snakes, bison, crocs and tigers.
33	"Wildlife in Combat (Part 1)"	John Stainton	Grant Dowling	23 June 2000
Steve and Terri help U.S. Army Rangers to remove venomous snakes out of harm's way from a training course at Eglin Air Force Base in Florida.
34	"Forces of Nature (Part 2)"	John Stainton	Grant Dowling	24 June 2000
Visiting U.S. armed forces at Eglin Air Force Base, Steve gets to ride in Air Force jets. Then, he and Terri visit the Everglades in South Florida.

=== Season 4 (2000–02) ===
No. overall	Title	Directed by	Written by	Original release date
35	"Sidewinders of Arizona"	John Stainton	Grant Dowling	19 November 2000
Steve and Terri visit the Barry M. Goldwater Military Range in Arizona to track down the sidewinder rattlesnake. Afterward, Steve visits the airmen at Luke Air Force Base, who prove to be fans of his show. Steve gets the opportunity to fly in an F-16, the plane that carries the sidewinder missile named after the rattlesnake.
36	"Captured on Camera"	John Stainton	Grant Dowling	27 November 2000 (NBC)
A compilation of the best moments of the series up to this point. Note: This was one of five episodes contractually obligated to premiere on broadcast network NBC; it later aired on Animal Planet in 2002.
37	"Crocodiles of the Revolution"	John Stainton	Grant Dowling	10 December 2000
In the aftermath of the civil war between East Timor (Timor-Leste) and neighboring Indonesia, the United Nations, World Animal Protection (then known as WSPA) and the Australian Army discover two crocodiles - a female 9-footer nicknamed Maxine and a male 11-footer nicknamed Anthony - living in horrendous conditions and ask Steve and the Australia Zoo team to come to Dili and help. With help from Australian soldiers, the team captures and relocates them into state-of-the-art facilities that they built behind a church in what becomes known officially as the East Timor Crocodile Project.
38	"Journey to the Red Center"	John Stainton	Grant Dowling	17 December 2000
Steve and Terri journey to the Red Desert at the heart of Australia. They examine venomous snakes, lizards and endangered mammals as they make their way to the world famous Uluru, also known as Ayers Rock.
39	"Africa's Deadliest Snakes"	John Stainton	Grant Dowling	12 February 2001 (NBC)
Steve journeys to Kenya in search of some of Africa's most venomous snakes, including the black mamba and cobra. Note: This was one of five episodes that was contractually obligated to premiere on broadcast network NBC; it later aired on Animal Planet in 2002.
40	"Wildest Home Videos"	John Stainton	Grant Dowling	19 March 2001 (NBC)
Steve and Terri show us their home video collection, most of which document their conservation work. Note: This was one of five episodes that was contractually obligated to premiere on broadcast network NBC; it later aired on Animal Planet in 2002.
41	"Big Croc Diaries"	John Stainton	Grant Dowling	21 May 2001 (one-hour version) (NBC)
41	"Big Croc Diaries"	John Stainton	Grant Dowling	21 June 2003 (two-hour version)
Steve and Terri show off their favorite crocodiles at Australia Zoo. The action includes shots of the biggest crocodiles eating pigs whole. High-speed film techniques highlight the power of the mighty creatures. Note: This was one of five episodes that was contractually obligated to premiere on broadcast network NBC; it later aired on Animal Planet in 2002, followed by an extended version in 2003.
42	"Swimming with Alligators"	John Stainton	Grant Dowling	18 June 2001
A missile-test site is the home of alligators. Steve also examines snakes in Louisiana and water moccasins.
43	"Surfing Snakes"	John Stainton	Grant Dowling	19 June 2001
Steve heads to Indonesia where he looks at venomous snakes, lizards and monkeys.
44	"Last Primates of Madagascar (Part 1)"	John Stainton	Grant Dowling	20 June 2001
Steve attempts to find members of the four remaining lemur species on the island of Madagascar. He travels through the countryside on bicycle and talks with the town inhabitants.
45	"Reptiles of the Lost Continent (Part 2)"	John Stainton	Grant Dowling	20 June 2001
Steve looks at cave-dwelling crocodiles, different types of chameleon and other unusual reptiles on Madagascar.
46	"Spitting Cobras of the World"	John Stainton	Grant Dowling	21 June 2001
Steve encounters spitting cobras, snakes that send venom into the eyes of their victims from up to 6 feet away. Despite wearing safety goggles, Steve must seek out medical assistance at a Maasai village after he is sprayed with the venom.
47	"Dangerous Africans"	John Stainton	Grant Dowling	22 June 2001
Steve encounters charging elephants on an African safari. He observes snakes, scorpions, buffalo, spiders and lions, and avoids a pursuing hippo.
48	"Wild Surf of Indonesia"	John Stainton	Grant Dowling	23 June 2001
Steve travels to Indonesia to encounter wildlife, then hits the beach to do some surfing.
49	"Operation Steve"	John Stainton	Grant Dowling	22 September 2001 (Discovery Channel)
Steve undergoes knee surgery. Note: This is the only regular episode of "The Crocodile Hunter" that was only a half-hour long; most other regular episodes were at least an hour long.
50	"Operation: Bunya Rescue"	John Stainton	Grant Dowling	11 February 2002
Steve and Terri relocate the animals of a bankrupt zoo, including koalas, kangaroos, crocodiles, birds, and a wombat.
51	"Africa's Final Frontier"	John Stainton	Grant Dowling	23 June 2002
Steve visits the wilderness of Namibia in southern Africa.
52	"Graham's Revenge"	John Stainton	Grant Dowling	10 August 2002 (NBC)
Steve and the team at Australia Zoo successfully transfer the ornery crocodile Graham and his girlfriend Bindi to a new enclosure. Not long after, Steve and Wes Mannion have to enter the enclosure. Graham gets his revenge by attacking Wes. Steve saves the day by jumping on Graham, although Wes suffers severe injuries. Note: This was one of five episodes contractually obligated to premiere on broadcast network NBC; it later aired on Animal Planet in 2003.

=== Season 5 (2002–04) ===
No. overall	Title	Directed by	Written by	Original release date
53	"From the Outback to Hollywood"	John Stainton	Grant Dowling	20 November 2002
A detailed account of Steve and Terri Irwin's sudden and unexpected rise to fame, in just one short decade. Footage includes the whirlwind of a promotional tour for their first Hollywood film, and their conservation work at the Australia Zoo.
54	"Casper: The White Crocodile"	John Stainton	Grant Dowling	10 June 2003
Steve relocates an extremely ornery white crocodile named Casper.
55	"Whale Sharks of the Wild West (Part 1)"	John Stainton	Grant Dowling	11 June 2003
Steve enters the water to look at dolphins, seals and sharks. He also takes time to look at the wreck of the Batavia and see tammar wallabies and pythons.
56	"Crocodile Coast (Part 2)"	John Stainton	Grant Dowling	12 June 2003
Steve looks at the crocodiles, sharks and sea snakes in the Kimberley region coastal area of Western Australia.
57	"River of the Dammed"	John Stainton	Grant Dowling	13 June 2003
Steve is the special guest of the Belize Zoo as they celebrate their 20th anniversary. He also travels up the Macal River to observe a controversial dam project and tangles with a highly venomous fer-de-lance snake while searching for Morelet crocodiles.
58	"They Shoot Crocodiles, Don't They?"	John Stainton	Grant Dowling	19 August 2003
Steve gives the viewers a look at the seven cameramen who have captured his encounters with wildlife over the years.
59	"Search for a Super Croc"	John Stainton	Grant Dowling	14 June 2004
Steve and the crocodile capture team take journey to the remote part of Queensland to find large saltwater crocodiles. Note: This episode originally aired as a two-hour special, but in later reruns, it was divided into two separate episodes.
60	"Crocs in the City"	John Stainton	Grant Dowling	15 June 2004
Steve Irwin works with the Mexican government to solve croc problems in the resort towns of Tampico and Cancún.
61	"Island of Snakes"	John Stainton	Grant Dowling	16 June 2004
Steve Irwin travels to Sri Lanka to help laborers contend with some of the most venomous snakes in the world like the Russell's vipers and the cobras. And, for the first time in his life, he goes head-to-head with a man-eating mugger crocodile.
62	"Tigers of Shark Bay"	John Stainton	Grant Dowling	17 June 2004
Steve observes the tiger sharks of Western Australia's Shark Bay. He helps to release a captive tiger shark back into the wild, and he hand feeds bull sharks.
63	"Ice Breaker"	John Stainton	Grant Dowling	18 June 2004
Steve and his camera crew look at the wildlife of Antarctica, including penguins, leopard seals, humpback whales and elephant seals. Note: This episode caused a controversy in June 2004 as people believed Irwin and his crew disturbed wildlife.
64	"Confessions of the Crocodile Hunter"	John Stainton	Grant Dowling	18 June 2004
This episode takes a look at the accomplishments of Steve and Terri Irwin. The infamous "Baby Bob incident" is explored in detail as Steve and Terri explain the events of that day.

== Specials ==
The following is a list of specials hosted by Irwin relating to the series, but that were not official episodes.

No.	Title	Directed by	Written by	Original release date
S1	"The Ten Deadliest Snakes in the World"	Mark Strickson	Sophie Cooper	8 December 1996
The special revolves around Steve Irwin (along for the #1 snake with his best mate, Wes Mannion), showcasing what he believes to be the ten deadliest snakes on the planet, all conveniently located in Australia. Here is the list from least to most deadliest: 10. Western Brown Snake (Darwin, Northern Territory) 9. Death Adder (Carnarvon Range, Queensland) 8. Giant Tiger Snake (Mt. Chapel Island, Tasmania) 7. Western Tiger Snake (Perth, Western Australia) 6. Beaked Sea Snake (Great Barrier Reef, Queensland) 5. Reevesby Island Tiger Snake (Reevesby Island, Adelaide, S Australia) 4. Eastern Tiger Snake (Great Dividing Range, forests) 3. Taipan (Bundaberg, Queensland) 2. Common Brown Snake (Brisbane, Australia) 1. Western or Inland Taipan aka Fierce Snake aka Oxyuranus microlepidotus ("at the very back of the Outback" - location undisclosed, plains, extremely remote) Note: One bite could kill 100 adult humans.
S2	"Crocs Down Under"	Mark Strickson	Sophie Cooper	1 February 1998
The Australian Saltwater crocodile is the world’s largest terrestrial carnivore. Intrepid natural historian, Steve Irwin, journeys to Australia’s far northeastern corner to try and capture a nuisance crocodile and teach him a lesson before releasing him back into the wild. Set against the colorful backdrop of Australia’s Top End, the special shows that these often ferocious man-eaters have a gentler side that make them caring lovers and devoted parents.
S3	"Lights! Croc! Action!"	John Stainton	John Stainton	27 June 2002
A special behind-the-scenes look at the then upcoming feature-length film, The Crocodile Hunter: Collision Course.
S4	"Steve Irwin's Ghosts of War: Chapter I"	John Stainton	John Stainton	7 August 2002 (Discovery Channel)
In this epic two-hour special, Steve revisits some of the notorious and legendary battlegrounds of the Pacific conflict between the US and Allied forces and Japan during World War II.
S5	"Steve Irwin's Ghosts of War: Chapter II"	John Stainton	John Stainton	7 August 2002 (Discovery Channel)
Steve continues his search for WWII artifacts and battlefields in the South Pacific.
S6	"Up Over Down Under"	John Stainton	Grant Dowling	23 December 2002 (Travel Channel)
Steve and Terri travel with their young daughter Bindi from Brisbane to Broome in Western Australia on an old DC-3 airplane.
S7	"Steve's Last Adventure"	John Stainton	John Stainton; Grant Dowling; Steve Irwin	29 July 2005
A three-hour-long special meant to wrap up the series proper, with footage of Irwin's across-the-world adventures in locations including the Himalayas, the Yangtze River, Borneo, and Kruger National Park.
S8	"Steve Irwin's Great Escape: US National Parks"	John Stainton	John Stainton	16 April 2006 (Travel Channel)
The Irwin family explore national parks of the United States, travelling through North Dakota, South Dakota, Wyoming, Colorado, New Mexico, and Texas.
S9	"Steve Irwin's Great Escape: National Parks Down Under"	John Stainton	John Stainton	12 June 2006 (Travel Channel)
The Irwins explore national parks of Australia, travelling through Northern Territory and South Australia.
S10	"Ocean's Deadliest"	John Stainton	Grant Dowling	21 January 2007 (Simulcast on Discovery Channel and Animal Planet)
Philippe Cousteau, Jr. and Steve Irwin film some of Australia's deadliest sea animals. Irwin was filming this documentary when he died. Aired posthumously, and dedicated to his memory.
S11	"Crikey! What an Adventure: An Intimate Look at the Life of Steve Irwin"	John Stainton	Grant Dowling	21 January 2007 (Simulcast on Discovery Channel and Animal Planet)
Steve's family and friends remember him, in this tribute special that premiered immediately after "Ocean's Deadliest". Also features archive footage from the show.
S12	"My Daddy, the Crocodile Hunter"	John Stainton	Grant Dowling	8 June 2007
Bindi Irwin's touching tribute to her late father. Also contains never-before-seen footage of Steve and Bindi's experiences together.
S13	"Secrets of the Crocodile"	John Stainton	Grant Dowling	4 September 2007
Steve attempts to learn the secrets of the crocodile, and why they have survived for 200 million years. Filmed in 2005, but aired in 2007 on the one year anniversary of Irwin's death.
