= Robert Irwin =

Australian conservationist (born 2003)

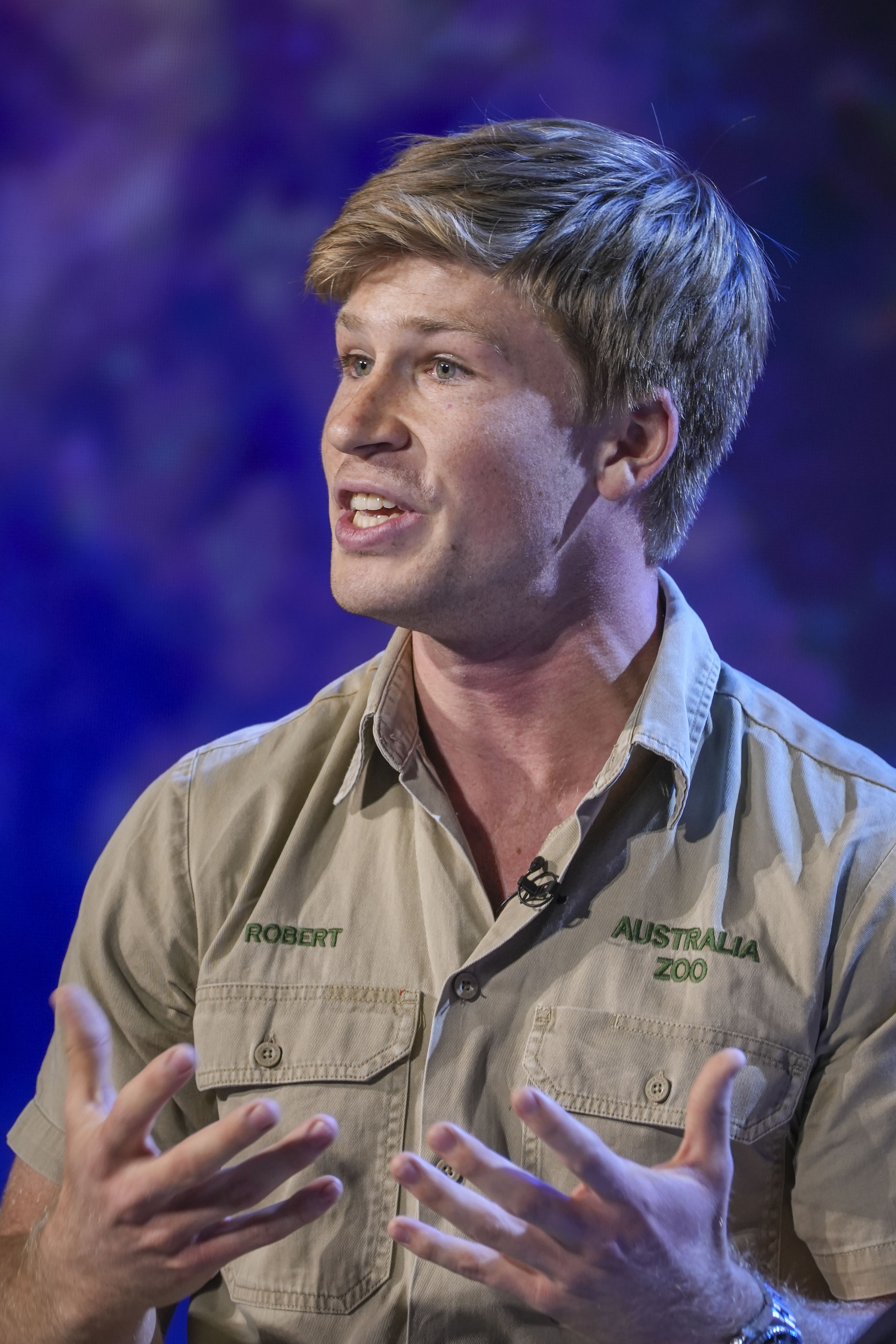
- Irwin in 2024
- Born: Robert Clarence Irwin; 1 December 2003 (age 22); Buderim, Queensland, Australia
- Other names: Bob Irwin; Baby Bob
- Citizenship: Australia; United States
- Occupations: Conservationist; zookeeper; wildlife photographer; television presenter; actor
- Years active: 2004–present
- Parents: Steve Irwin (father); Terri Irwin (mother)
- Relatives: Bindi Irwin (sister); Bob Irwin (grandfather)
- Website: robertirwinphotos.com

Robert Clarence Irwin (born 1 December 2003) is an Australian conservationist, zookeeper, wildlife photographer, and television presenter. The son of conservationists Steve and Terri Irwin, he is regarded as an influential figure in Australian popular culture. Time magazine named him and his older sister, Bindi, one of the 100 most influential emerging leaders in the world on its inaugural list in 2019.

Born and raised on the Sunshine Coast, Irwin started working at his family's Australia Zoo when he was a child. As he grew older, he became frequently involved in the activities that his father originally participated in. Irwin received wide recognition and numerous accolades for his photography, including exhibitions in museums across Australia, the United States, and the United Kingdom. In 2024, he was named a global ambassador for the Earthshot Prize, launched by William, Prince of Wales. He currently serves as a member of Australia Zoo's management team and is on the board of directors of its non-profit organisation, Wildlife Warriors.

On television, Irwin starred in the Animal Planet series Crikey! It's the Irwins (2018–2022) with his family. He co-hosted the Network 10 entertainment program I'm a Celebrity...Get Me Out of Here! (2024–2026) alongside Julia Morris, which earned him the Logie Award for Most Popular Presenter. Irwin won the thirty-fourth season of the ABC competition series Dancing with the Stars with professional dancer Witney Carson, and hosted the spin-off program The Next Pro. He presented the Logie Awards of 2026, becoming the ceremony's youngest host, and will host the revival of the sports program Australian Ninja Warrior alongside Georgie Tunny and Beau Ryan.

== Early life ==
Robert Clarence Irwin was born on 1 December 2003 in Buderim, a suburb on the Sunshine Coast of Queensland. He is the youngest child and only son of Australian conservationist Steve Irwin (1962–2006) and American naturalist Terri Irwin (née Raines; b. 1964). His parents owned and operated Australia Zoo together and rose to international prominence with their wildlife documentary series The Crocodile Hunter (1996–2004). Irwin was named after his paternal and maternal grandfathers: Bob Irwin (b. 1939), the co-founder of Australia Zoo, and Clarence Raines (1921–2008), a World War II veteran. His older sister, Bindi (b. 1998), is also a conservationist and television presenter. The siblings are dual citizens of Australia and the United States, and are of English, Irish, and Swedish descent.

Irwin was blessed by Tibetan Buddhist nuns during a ceremony held by his parents at Australia Zoo one month after he was born. Moments later, his father carried him in his arm while hand feeding a chicken carcass to a 3.8-metre (12 ft 6 in) saltwater crocodile named Murray. Irwin was close to the reptile, which sparked international media outrage and brought comparisons to the singer Michael Jackson dangling his son outside of a hotel window one year prior. The incident prompted the Queensland Government to change its crocodile handling laws, banning children and untrained adults from entering crocodile enclosures. Special dispensation, however, was granted to a child who met a very strict set of guidelines and training requirements.

When Irwin was two years old, his father was killed by a stingray barb injury to the heart while filming an underwater documentary. He was homeschooled at Australia Zoo for his entire education, allowing flexibility for his wildlife and media commitments. Irwin developed an interest in photography partly through his father; he found it to be an "individual" way of continuing his work. He started taking photographs when he was six years old using a point-and-shoot camera and later received his first DSLR, the Canon EOS 700D. He graduated high school with two TAFE certificates when he was fifteen years old.

== Career ==
=== 2004–2013: Early beginnings ===
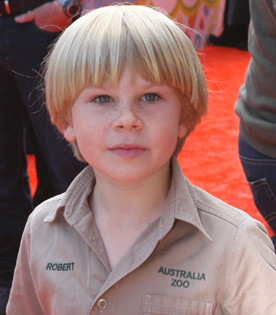
Irwin in 2011

Irwin made his television debut during his parents' appearance on the interview program Enough Rope with Andrew Denton on 22 March 2004. He made two appearances on his sister's television series Bindi the Jungle Girl (2007–2008), and had an uncredited cameo role in the family film Free Willy: Escape from Pirate's Cove. At the age of eight, following extensive training, Irwin was allowed to feed alligators and freshwater crocodiles for the first time under expert supervision.

In March 2013, Irwin earned his first Logie Award nomination for Most Popular New Male Talent for his role on the Network 10 program Steve Irwin's Wildlife Warriors. He also released a series of children's books titled Dinosaur Hunter, which he provided illustrations and co-authored with Lachlan Creag and Jack Wells. Irwin was involved in a six-year campaign, led by his mother, to prevent bauxite strip mining at the Steve Irwin Wildlife Reserve on the Cape York Peninsula. The Queensland Government passed legislation to protect the reserve from mining in November.

=== 2014–2017: Rise to prominence ===
On his tenth birthday, Irwin fed his first large saltwater crocodile, named Monty, at the Australia Zoo's Crocoseum. He was supervised and assisted by Wes Mannion, the zoo's director and his late father's best friend. Irwin made his television presenting debut alongside Isabel Yamazaki on the Discovery Asia-Pacific science program Wild But True (2014–2015), which explored biomimetics. The program was nominated for Best Kids: Factual at the 5th International Emmy Kids Awards. Irwin made a guest appearance on the second season of the British documentary series Ten Deadliest Snakes with Nigel Marven. He was named the junior runner-up of Australian Geographic's 2016 Nature Photographer of the Year competition for his image of a large male saltwater crocodile resting on a riverbank in Northern Queensland.

Beginning in February 2017, Irwin made regular appearances on the NBC late-night program The Tonight Show Starring Jimmy Fallon. He made eleven appearances on the show in a span of two years and found success with American television viewers by presenting various animals to host Jimmy Fallon and comedian Kevin Hart. Irwin was invested as a member and ambassador of Scouts Australia on 6 April 2017, formalising a partnership between the organisation and Australia Zoo that aimed to encourage Australian youth to get involved with wilderness and conservation. Irwin was a junior finalist for Australian Geographic's 2017 Nature Photographer of the Year competition. His image of a young spotted python slithering in the bushland of the Cape York Peninsula was exhibited at the South Australian Museum in Adelaide and the Australian Museum in Sydney.

=== 2018–2019: Photography recognition and Crikey! It's the Irwins ===
In April 2018, Irwin and his family unveiled his father's star on the Hollywood Walk of Fame and met with Charles, Prince of Wales at Lady Elliot Island to discuss the future of the Great Barrier Reef. He was named a junior finalist for Australian Geographic's 2018 Nature Photographer of the Year competition with his image of a sunset at the Great Dividing Range. In October, Irwin started running Australia Zoo's daily crocodile feeding demonstrations; a job previously held by his father. He also starred in and co-produced the Animal Planet television program Crikey! It's the Irwins alongside his mother and sister. The series, like The Crocodile Hunter franchise, followed the family and their work at Australia Zoo across four seasons.

For capturing a tundra swan at the Klamath Basin in Oregon, Irwin was highly honoured in the youth category at the 2018 Nature's Best Windland Smith Rice International Photography Awards and was exhibited at the National Museum of Natural History in Washington, DC. His image of a huntsman spider in mid-air while clutching a dead frog was highly commended in the youth category at the 2018 Wildlife Photographer of the Year Awards.

Two of Irwin's photographs, featuring an Eurasian dotterel and an emu, were commended in the youth category at the 2019 BirdLife Australia Photography Awards. He was named a junior finalist for Australian Geographic's 2019 Nature Photographer of the Year competition with his image of a bearded dragon camouflaging on a log in Blackbutt, Queensland. Two of his photographs were highly honoured at the 2019 Nature's Best Windland Smith Rice International Photography Awards; one image featured one of the last known northern white rhinoceroses in the world at the Ol Pejeta Conservancy in Kenya. The Queensland Tourism Industry Council declared Irwin their Young Achiever of the Year, in recognition of his contributions to "the development of a vibrant and professional tourism industry."

=== 2020–2024: I'm a Celebrity ===
In the wake of the COVID-19 pandemic, Annastacia Palaszczuk, the premier of Queensland, recruited Irwin for a domestic tourism campaign encouraging Australians to spend their holiday at the state. He was named the junior runner-up for Australian Geographic's 2020 Nature Photographer of the Year competition with his close-up image of an Australian scrub python. Irwin won the People's Choice Award at the 2020 Wildlife Photographer of the Year Awards for capturing a large bushfire burning near the border of the Steve Irwin Wildlife Reserve during Australia's Black Summer. The image was exhibited at the Natural History Museum in London.

Irwin made a guest appearance on the animated television series Bluey in February 2021 as a dingo retail clerk named Alfie. While filming for the fourth and final season of Crikey! It's the Irwins, Irwin had to make an emergency escape from a crocodile enclosure after a 3.7-metre-long (12 ft), 350-kilogram (770 lb) saltwater crocodile, named Casper, ignored the food Irwin was offering him and instead made a beeline for Irwin himself. He managed to scale the enclosure walls just in time and avoided injury. Irwin made a surprise performance with the original members of the children's music group The Wiggles at the Brisbane Entertainment Centre in May 2022. He published his first photo book, Robert Irwin's Australia, in October; all proceeds were directed towards wildlife conservation efforts.

In October 2023, Irwin announced the first successful breeding program of the Irwin's turtle, which was discovered by and named after his father, for zoological purposes. He later replaced veterinarian Chris Brown as the co-host of the Network 10 television program I'm a Celebrity...Get Me Out of Here! alongside comedian Julia Morris. Irwin agreed to host under the condition that the series stopped using wildlife products. Two months later, he was honoured by GQ Australia as their Social Force of the Year. For his inaugural season of I'm a Celebrity...Get Me Out of Here!, Irwin was nominated for Most Popular Personality on Australian Television and the Bert Newton Award for Most Popular Presenter at the Logie Awards of 2024. He was also recognised by Mediaweek as a rising star in Australia's advertising, media and marketing industries. In September, he and South African actress Nomzamo Mbatha were named the first two global ambassadors for the Earthshot Prize, founded by William, Prince of Wales.

=== 2025–present: Dancing with the Stars and Australian Ninja Warrior ===
At the 14th AACTA Awards in February 2025, Irwin won Favourite Australian Media Personality. He was announced as the first contestant on the thirty-fourth season of the American competition series Dancing with the Stars in April. By the following month, he assumed a managerial role at Australia Zoo and was named to the board of directors of its non-profit organisation Wildlife Warriors. Irwin starred in the second chapter of Tourism Australia's Come and Say G'day campaign, which launched in key international markets in August. It amassed over 374 million views worldwide and was effective in drawing positive interest from potential tourists.

On Dancing with the Stars, Irwin was partnered with professional dancer Witney Carson; he later competed in a jive relay with actress Xochitl Gomez. Their foxtrot routine to "Footprints in the Sand" by Leona Lewis made them the first individual couple of the season to earn a perfect score. Despite Irwin suffering a rib cage injury prior to the finale, the couple won the competition on 25 November 2025. Irwin is the first Australian male contestant to win the series and, at age 21, is the youngest male winner so far. Additionally, as his sister won the twenty-first season with professional dancer Derek Hough, they became the first celebrity sibling duo to be crowned champions.

Week	Dance	Music	Judges' scores (Note: Individual judges' scores are listed in the following order: Carrie Ann Inaba, Derek Hough, Bruno Tonioli.)			Total score	Result
1	Jive	"Born to be Wild" — Steppenwolf	—N/a (Note: Robert and Witney only received two judges's scores, as Carrie Ann Inaba was absent.)	8	7	15	No elimination
2	Tango	"Move Your Feet" — Junior Senior	8	7	7	22	Safe
3	Salsa	"Million Dollar Baby" — Tommy Richman	8	7	7	22	Safe
4	Cha-cha-cha	"Try Everything" (from Zootopia)	7	7	8	22	Safe
5	Contemporary	"You'll Be in My Heart" — Phil Collins	8	9	9	35 (Note: Robert and Witney also received a score of 9 from guest judge Kym Johnson.)	No elimination
6	Jazz	"Dancing Through Life" — Jonathan Bailey feat. Ariana Grande, Ethan Slater, Marissa Bode and Cynthia Erivo	9	9	9	36 (Note: Robert and Witney also received a score of 9 from guest judge Jon M. Chu.)	Safe
7	Argentine tango	"Sweet Dreams (Are Made of This)" — Hampton String Quartet	10	9	10	38 (Note: Robert and Witney also received a score of 9 from guest judge Cheryl Burke.)	Safe
7	Hustle & Lindy Hop; Marathon	"Murder on the Dancefloor" — Sophie Ellis-Bextor & "A Little Party Never Killed Nobody (All We Got)" — Fergie, Q-Tip, & GoonRock	—N/a			3 (Note: Robert and Witney received three bonus points in this dance marathon.)	Safe
8	Paso doble	"Icky Thump" — The White Stripes	9	9	10	38 (Note: Robert and Witney also received a score of 10 from guest judge Flavor Flav.)	Safe
8	Freestyle (Team Kool)	"Celebration" — Kool & the Gang	9	10	9	38 (Note: Team Kool also received a score of 10 from guest judge Flavor Flav.)	Safe
9 (Quarterfinals)	Foxtrot	"Footprints in the Sand" — Leona Lewis	10	10	10	40 (Note: Robert and Witney also received a score of 10 from guest judge Tom Bergeron.)	Safe
9 (Quarterfinals)	Jive (Dance relay)	"Dance with Me Tonight" — Olly Murs	Winners			2 (Note: Robert received two bonus points for winning this dance relay with celebrity partner Xochitl Gomez.)	Safe
10 (Semifinals)	Jive	"Baby I'm a Star" — Prince	10	10	10	30	Safe
10 (Semifinals)	Viennese waltz	"WOW" — Prince	10	9	10	29	Safe
11 (Finals)	Quickstep	"Are You Gonna Be My Girl" — Jet	9	10	10	29	WINNER
11 (Finals)	Cha-cha-cha (Instant dance)	"Cake by the Ocean" — DNCE	10	10	10	30	WINNER
11 (Finals)	Freestyle	"Black and Gold" — Sam Sparro & "The Nights" — Avicii	10	10	10	30	WINNER

Notes

Irwin made his feature film debut as a koala airport receptionist in the buddy cop animated film Zootopia 2 (2025). He won Favourite Australian Media Personality for a second time at the 15th AACTA Awards in February 2026. Irwin served as the keynote speaker for the Jacksonville Zoo and Gardens' annual conservation gala. He also performed at select parts of the Western United States as a part of the Dancing with the Stars: Live! tour. He began narrating the Wildlife Express Train at Disney's Animal Kingdom in Walt Disney World in May.

Irwin hosted the spin-off television program Dancing with the Stars: The Next Pro, which premiered in July 2026. He presented the Logie Awards of 2026 the following month; becoming the youngest person to do so. During the ceremony, he won the Bert Newton Award for Most Popular Presenter and earned a second Gold Logie nomination for his final season of I'm a Celebrity. In 2027, Irwin was named the Queensland Australian of the Year in recognition of his contributions to wildlife conservation. He will also host Network 10's revival of the sports entertainment program Australian Ninja Warrior, presenting alongside Georgie Tunny and Beau Ryan.

== Public image ==
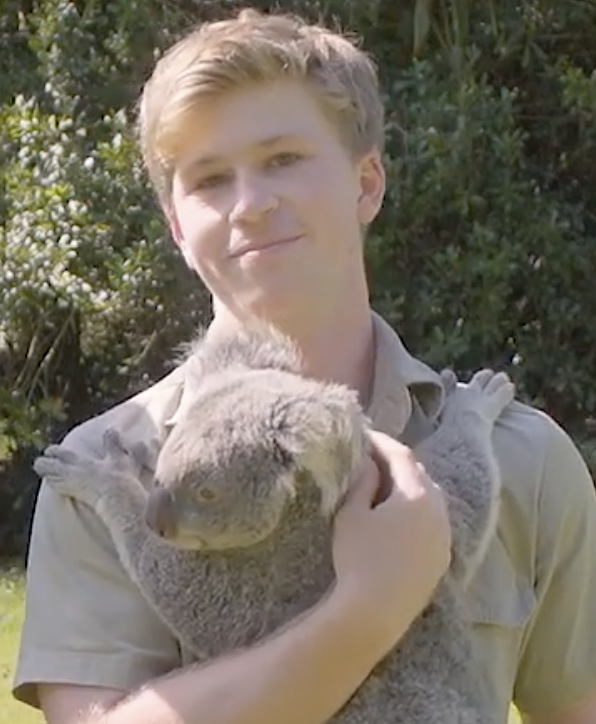
Irwin holding a koala in 2022

Irwin spent his entire life in the public eye due to his parents' celebrity status; which he admitted felt "weird". His birth was televised on the third and final season of their wildlife documentary series The Crocodile Hunter Diaries. From a young age, media outlets noticed that Irwin bore an uncanny resemblance in physical appearance, personality, and mannerisms to his late father. The press began commenting on Irwin's sex appeal and labelled him as a sex symbol when he transitioned into adulthood. Although he disagreed with the label, he embraced it as a way of further promoting environmentalism.

Dean Blake of Man of Many wrote that Irwin's charisma, effervescence, and comfortability in front of a camera allowed him to be "one of the most genuine and authentic voices in wildlife conservation". Talent agencies called him a "publicist's dream" and compared him to a live action Ken doll, "except with a brain, soul and gorgeous heart". Ashley Spencer for The New York Times complimented the way Irwin embraced his emotional vulnerability, noting that he "makes no attempt to appear cool or aloof. He often throws his head back in full-throated laughter, and he gleefully celebrates everyone around him". The Australian's Jenna Clarke echoed her sentiments and opined that he should be used as a yardstick for modern masculinity. Patrick Lenton of The Guardian wrote that while Dancing with the Stars notable for rehabilitating benighted public figures, Irwin's appearances were a genuinely wholesome "shot of joy". Michael Idato of The Sydney Morning Herald agreed, writing that his experience offered "an extremely positive story in an otherwise overwhelmingly negative news cycle".

Irwin is regarded as an influential figure in Australian popular culture. He and his sister were named to the inaugural Time 100 Next list in 2019. Mediaweek declared him the third-most influential Australian across social media platforms in 2023. Scientists with the Queensland Museum named a species of garden banded snails they discovered after him. At age 20, Irwin became the youngest Australian to be immortalised with a wax figure by Madame Tussauds Sydney. He is the third man in modern times to appear solo on the cover of The Australian Women's Weekly, joining actor Hugh Jackman and Prince Harry, Duke of Sussex. Irwin partnered with the National Football League (NFL) to promote their International Series. He was named a global ambassador for Columbia Sportswear, and starred in advertising campaigns for brands such as HelloFresh, Twisties, Qantas and Uber Eats. His underwear campaign for Bonds generated over US$80 million in earned media value.

== Personal life ==
Although he is "disarmingly friendly and welcoming" to the press, Irwin is very protective of his personal life. Journalists noticed that whenever he was approached with personal topics, he spoke about them "in broad terms, his cheerful tone belying the wall of privacy he has delicately constructed". Irwin resides on the private grounds of Australia Zoo with his family. From 2022 to 2024, he dated Rorie Buckey, the niece of actor Heath Ledger.

Irwin suffers from a mild case of germophobia and spasmenagaliaphobia, a rare and irrational fear of broken glass. He has spoken about his mental health struggles, including anxiety and imposter syndrome. Irwin is spiritual, but keeps his religious beliefs private. He supports LGBTQ+ rights, encouraged men to advocate for women's health, and is strongly opposed to generative artificial intelligence.

Irwin is a fan of the NFL's Seattle Seahawks, citing his familial connection to the Pacific Northwest. An avid participant in adventure sports, his hobbies include mountain biking, rock climbing, skateboarding and surfing. He also enjoys artistic pursuits such as cooking, creating forms of visual art, playing the guitar and singing.

== Filmography ==
Key
†	Denotes films that have not yet been released

=== Film ===
Year	Title	Role	Notes	Ref.
2010	Free Willy: Escape from Pirate's Cove	The Pirate Boy (uncredited)	Cameo role	
2015	The SpongeBob Movie: Sponge Out of Water	Kyle the Seagull (voice)	Australian edition only	
2025	Zootopia 2	Robert Furwin (voice)	Cameo role	

=== Television ===
Year	Title	Role	Notes	Ref.
2007–2008	Bindi the Jungle Girl	Himself	2 episodes; credited as Bob Irwin	
2011	Kate Plus 8	Himself	Episode: "Australia Zoo Visit"	
2012	Steve Irwin's Wildlife Warriors	Himself	Host alongside Bindi Irwin	
2014	Dino Dan: Trek's Adventures	Foreign exchange student from Australia	Episodes: "Dino Pals" and "Dino Mommas"	
2015	Ten Deadliest Snakes	Himself	Episode: "Australia"	
2015–present	Dancing with the Stars	Himself	Season 34 champion; guest appearance (S21, S35)	
2017–2019	The Tonight Show Starring Jimmy Fallon	Himself	Guest appearance; 11 episodes	
2018–2022	Crikey! It's the Irwins	Himself	Main cast; also co-producer	
2020	Bluey	Alfie (voice)	Guest role (S2E37)	
2020	Sesame Street	Himself	Guest appearance; 1 episode	
2020	Earth to Ned	Himself	Episode: "A Ned's Best Friend"	
2022	RuPaul's Drag Race Down Under	Himself	Guest appearance (S2E1)	
2022	Have You Been Paying Attention?	Himself	Guest quizmaster (S10E25)	
2022–2023	Celebrity Gogglebox Australia	Himself	Main cast	
2024–2026	I'm a Celebrity...Get Me Out of Here!	Himself	Host alongside Julia Morris	
2026–present	Dancing with the Stars: The Next Pro	Himself	Host	
2026	MasterChef Australia	Himself	Guest judge (S18E31)	
2026	Blue Peter	Himself	Episode: "Robert Irwin's Wildlife Adventure and Football Fun"	
2026	66th TV Week Logie Awards	Himself	Host	
2026	Disney Parks Christmas Day Parade †	Himself	Host alongside Malia Baker	
2027	Australian Ninja Warrior †	Himself	Host alongside Georgie Tunny and Beau Ryan	

== Accolades ==
Award	Year (Note: Indicates the year of ceremony. Each year is linked to the article about the awards held that year, wherever possible.)	Nominated work	Category	Result	Ref.
AACTA Awards	2025	Irwin	Favourite Australian Media Personality	Won	
AACTA Awards	2026	Irwin	Favourite Australian Media Personality	Won	
Critics' Choice Real TV Awards	2026	Dancing with the Stars	Male Star of the Year	Nominated	
Logie Awards	2013	Steve Irwin's Wildlife Warriors	Most Popular New Male Talent	Nominated	
Logie Awards	2024	I'm a Celebrity...Get Me Out of Here!	Most Popular Personality on Australian Television	Nominated	
Logie Awards	2024	I'm a Celebrity...Get Me Out of Here!	Bert Newton Award for Most Popular Presenter	Nominated	
Logie Awards	2026	I'm a Celebrity...Get Me Out of Here!	Most Popular Personality on Australian Television	Nominated	
Logie Awards	2026	I'm a Celebrity...Get Me Out of Here!	Bert Newton Award for Most Popular Presenter	Won	
Shorty Awards	2020	Irwin	Best in Activism (shared with Bindi Irwin)	Nominated	

=== Honorary awards ===
Awards and nominations received by Cate Blanchett
Organisation	Year	Category	Result	Ref.
National Australia Day Council	2027	Australian of the Year	Pending	
National Australia Day Council	2027	Queensland Australian of the Year	Won	
