= Urannah Dam =

Proposed dam in the Mackay Region of Queensland, Australia

- Location of the proposed dam in Queensland
- Interactive map of Urannah Dam
- Country: Australia
- Location: Mackay Region, Queensland
- Coordinates: 20°56′06″S 148°20′10″E
- Purpose: Water supply; Irrigation; Power generation
- Status: Proposed
- Operator: Bowen River Utilities (proponent)

Dam and spillways
- Type of dam: Gravity dam (proposed)
- Impounds: Broken River (proposed)
- Height (foundation): 60–80 m (200–260 ft) (proposed)
- Length: 840–941 m (2,756–3,087 ft) (proposed)
- Elevation at crest: 291–301 m (955–988 ft) AHD (proposed)
- Width (crest): 7 m (23 ft) (proposed)
- Spillway type: Uncontrolled (proposed)

Reservoir
- Total capacity: 940 GL (760,000 acre⋅ft) (proposed)
- Catchment area: 1,103 km^{2} (426 sq mi) (proposed)
- Surface area: 4,603–5,909 ha (11,370–14,600 acres) (proposed)

Power Station
- Type: Pumped-storage
- Installed capacity: 1,400 MW (1,900,000 hp) (proposed)
- Website bowenriverutilities.com

The Urannah Dam is a proposed dam across the Broken River that, when complete, will be located 90 kilometres (56 mi) west of Mackay in the Mackay Region, Queensland, Australia. The project, proposed by Bowen River Utilities, entails a dam, two pipelines to deliver water to industrial customers, a master planned irrigation scheme, and a pumped hydro which will feed reliable energy back into the grid.

Construction of the dam is opposed by conservationists, including concerns that the dam would impact the Irwin's turtle.

In October 2022, the Australian Government withdrew a March 2022 announcement to provide A$483 million towards construction of the dam. In December 2022, it was reported that the project was cancelled, as government funding for an environmental impact statement was not forthcoming.

== Dam proposal ==
The Urannah Dam is a A$2.9 billion project, proposed as a 940-gigalitre (760,000 acre⋅ft) (Note: Sometimes incorrectly reported as megalitres instead of gigalitres.) dam that includes a water pipeline network, an irrigated precinct of 7,000 hectares (17,000 acres), and a 1,400-megawatt (1,900,000 hp) pumped hyro-electricity storage and power generation infrastructure. The dam would provide water to mining in the region, as well as agriculture. The project proponent is Bowen River Utilities, previously known as the Urannah Water Scheme.

According to the 2019 preliminary business case, over a third of water from the proposed dam would be for current and expanded coal mining in the Bowen Basin. I the report, the support of regional mining expansion was expressed as the first and foremost of the opportunities listed for the water allocation. A supplementary "Water Demand Study" stated that within the region there were 30 active coal mines, and 57 proposed coal mining projects, and that there was a major shortfall of water required to supply the Bowen Basin coal industry.

The Urannah Dam was also linked to the expansion of coal mining in the Galilee Basin.

The dam was first proposed in the 1960s. Since then, there have been over 25 feasibility studies into the dam, but the project had not proceeded beyond that stage. A report prepared on behalf of the Mackay Conservation Group assessing the cost benefits of the dam project found that for every dollar spent on the dam, only 75 cents would be returned.

In 2016, the Australian Government granted A$3 million for a feasibility study for the project. There were concerns raised about the allocation of this funding despite Urannah Dam not being on a list of priority projects sent to the then Deputy Prime Minister Barnaby Joyce. Major concerns over conflict of interest were also raised, as the funding was awarded to the company Initiative Capital, which was run by an LNP member and party donor.

In December 2019, the Queensland Government granted A$10 million for a business case and environmental impact statement to be developed. The studies were expected completed by late 2021. In May 2020, the project was declared a coordinated project by Queensland's Coordinator-General, with a proposed construction date of 2022. In October 2020, the GHD Group authored a design report for the proposed dam that recommended construction of a gravity dam with a dam wall 60 to 80 metres (200 to 260 ft) high that would deliver capacity in the range of 940 to 1,390 gigalitres (760,000 to 1,130,000 acre⋅ft).

However, by late 2022, it was reported that the project was cancelled, due to the withdrawal of federal government funding.

== Cultural significance ==
Urannah is part of the homelands of the Wiri and Birri peoples of the Birri Gubba Nation. Urannah contains Aboriginal sacred sites, including burial sites and ceremonial sites. The Wiri and Birri peoples have stated:

We are the river people; our river is sacred; it is our life; it gives us the connection to our land and the beginning of creation. It is our duty to protect our Biri (river) against the rapid demand for water supplies to the mining industry in the Bowen Basin. Urannah Creek and Broken River are the last wild rivers in this country and the biodiversity and the environment is untouched.

— Descendant, Wiri and Birri people. Undated.

== Environmental significance ==
The Urannah valley is a pristine and undisturbed ecosystem, home to many terrestrial and aquatic species. The area contains a diversity of terrestrial habitats, including steep mountains and forested valleys, and over 20 plant species have been recorded at Urannah. Forest ecosystems at Urannah includes the endangered bluegum forests, as well as ironbark and black iron box forest. Urannah is also a rare example of pre-European native grasslands.

Urannah is home to the IUCN-listed "near threatened" species black-necked stork (Jaiburu), and the "vulnerable" grey falcon. Thirty species of birds have been identified at Urannah, including kookaburras, cockatoos, eagles, honey-eaters, owls, kingfishers and pelicans. Koalas, bettong, and several species of kangaroo, including the tree kangaroo, the grey kangaroo, and the pretty-face wallaby also live in the area.

Flowing through Urannah are Urannah Creek and the Broken River, which is part of the Burdekin River system. These rivers are home to Urannah's most iconic animal, Irwin's turtle, Elysea irwini, which was discovered by Steve and Bob Irwin. The turtle is endemic to the Broken-Bowen River system and the lower Burdekin River, and is of high conservation significance, with a restricted range that places the species at risk of decline. According to the Threatened Species Scientific Committee, the proposed development of Urannah Dam would have a significant negative impact on Irwin's turtle.

The endangered Eungella day frog has been found at Urannah. Five species of fish have been found in Urannah's rivers, including rainbow fish, 5-barred grunter, spangled perch, sooty grunter and blue catfish. Crocodiles and platypus are also known to live in the rivers and creeks of Urannah.
