= John Stainton =

Australian filmmaker (born 1953)

- Occupations: Film producer; television producer; film director
- Years active: 1975–2011

John Stainton (born 1953) is an Australian film and television producer and director. He was close friends with the late naturalist Steve Irwin. Stainton also created Irwin's popular nature documentary television series, The Crocodile Hunter, in which he also directed and executive produced every episode (save for a few specials), as well as the spin-offs, Croc Files and The Crocodile Hunter Diaries, and the feature-film, The Crocodile Hunter: Collision Course.

Stainton was adamant in preventing the footage of Irwin's last moments, which depicts the moments after his fatal stingray attack, from being publicly released, stating that "it should be destroyed". There were rumours that the footage had been leaked onto the internet, but all were revealed to be faked.

In the memorial service held on 20 September 2006 for Irwin, Stainton made an appearance to pay tribute to his friend.

== Partial filmography ==
- Confessions of the Crocodile Hunter
- Tigers of Shark Bay
- Crocs in the City
- Search for a Super Croc
- Ice Breaker
- Island of Snakes
- Ocean's Deadliest
- Bindi the Jungle Girl
- The Crocodile Hunter: Collision Course
- The Crocodile Hunter Diaries
- The Crocodile Hunter's Croc Files
- The Crocodile Hunter
- Ghosts of War
- New Breed Vets
- "Your Worst Animal Nightmares"
- Crikey! What an Adventure
- In Steve's Footsteps
- My Daddy, the Crocodile Hunter
