= Qiyun Woo =

Singaporean environmentalist

- Born: 1997 (age 28–29); Singapore
- Occupation: Environmental activist
- Awards: National Geographic 33 2026, Forbes 30 Under 30 2025, BBC's Top 100 Women 2023, National

Qiyun Woo is a Singaporean environmental activist, science communicator, content creator and artist. She was recognized by National Geographic's 33, Forbes 30 Under 30 Asia, and as one of BBC's 100 Most Inspiring and Influential Women of 2023.

== Early life and education ==
Woo was born in 1997 in Singapore. She attained a Bachelor of Environmental Studies from the National University of Singapore (NUS).

== Career ==
Woo currently works at the United Nations Intergovernmental Panel on Climate Change.

== Activism ==
Woo started her Environmental Activism Journey at the age of nine when she penned a three-page essay when Australian zookeeper and television personality Steve Irwin died after being pierced by a stingray barb in 2006. She started the page @theweirdandwild on Instagram to communicate the issues with the environment in Singapore through graphic designs, animations, and informational images and videos.
