= Crikey steveirwini =

Scientific classification
- Kingdom: Animalia
- Phylum: Mollusca
- Class: Gastropoda
- Order: Stylommatophora
- Family: Camaenidae
- Subfamily: Hadrinae
- Genus: Crikey; Stanisic, 2009
- Species: C. steveirwini

Binomial name
- Crikey steveirwini Stanisic, 2009

Species of gastropod

Crikey steveirwini is a species of air-breathing land snail, a terrestrial pulmonate gastropod mollusc in the family Camaenidae. Crikey steveirwini is the only species in the genus Crikey.

== Etymology ==
The specific name steveirwini is in memory of Australian wildlife expert Steve Irwin, who died from a stingray injury in 2006. The genus name Crikey was a favourite exclamation of Steve Irwin's, "crikey!" being a minced oath. The snail species was described by John Stanisic, a scientist at the Queensland Museum who was later awarded Certified Environmental Practitioner of the Year 2010.

== Habitat ==
Crikey steveirwini occurs in the north-eastern part of Queensland, Australia, in the tropical rainforests also known as the Wet Tropics. Crikey steveirwini is an arboreal species. It has been found at altitudes over 1,000 metres (3,300 ft).

== Appearance ==
A small, rare species, Crikey steveirwini has a high spire and is a creamy yellow with coppery brown spiral bands. It can reach 15 millimetres (0.59 in) in size.

== See also ==
- List of organisms named after famous people (born 1950–1974)
