= Bindi the Jungle Girl =

Television series

- Genre: Documentary; Adventure; Family; Education
- Presented by: Bindi Irwin
- Starring: Bindi Irwin; Terri Irwin; Robert Irwin; Steve Irwin; Macaila Fernandes; Dani Hagan; Johnny Maio
- Composer: Mark McDuff
- Countries of origin: Australia; United States
- Original language: English
- No. of seasons: 2
- No. of episodes: 33

Production
- Executive producers: John Stainton; Judi Bailey
- Cinematography: Craig Lucas
- Running time: 22 minutes approx
- Production company: The Best Picture Show Company

Original release
- Network: Discovery Kids (America); ABC for Kids (Australia)
- Release: 9 June 2007 – 20 December 2008

Bindi the Jungle Girl is a children's nature documentary television series, presented by Bindi Irwin, the daughter of Steve and Terri Irwin. The series was produced and shot in Queensland by The Best Picture Show Company for Discovery Kids and the Australian Broadcasting Corporation.

The series aired from 9 June 2007 until 20 December 2008 on American networks Discovery Kids and simulcast on Animal Planet and on ABC1 in Australia from 18 July 2007.

The series also features Bindi's mother Terri, her younger brother Robert, and Steve Irwin's "best mate" and director of Australia Zoo, Wes Mannion. Bindi performs songs and dances with a group called the Crocmen, and answers questions from viewers in the "Bindi's Blog" segment.

Steve Irwin appeared in several episodes filmed prior to his death in 2006. The second series was produced after his death, but he appears in archive footage in a segment named "Croc Hunter Unplugged", generally spoken of transcendentally in the present tense.

== Plot ==
Bindi Sue Irwin and her late father, "Crocodile Hunter" Steve Irwin, try to spread the idea of conservation by teaching the world about many different types of animals and explain why they are important.

== Cast ==
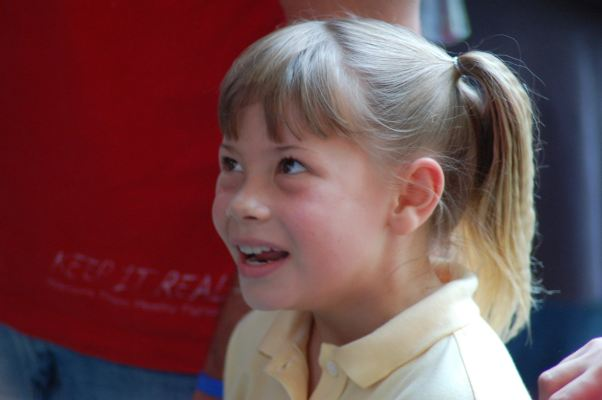
Bindi Irwin in 2007

- Bindi Irwin as herself
- Terri Irwin as herself
- Robert Irwin as himself
- Steve Irwin as himself
- Macaila Fernandes as Girl with Cat
- Dani Hagan as Hamster Care Educator
- Johnny Maio as Boy with Guinea Pigs

== Episodes ==
=== Series overview ===
Series	Episodes	Originally released	
Series	Episodes	First released	Last released
1	26	9 June 2007	31 May 2008
2	7	27 September 2008	20 December 2008

=== Season 1 (2007–08) ===
No. overall	No. in season	Title	U.S. air date	Australian air date
1	1	"Not Many Left"	9 June 2007	10 November 2009
Bindi talks about animals in countries where there are not many left.
2	2	"Elephants at Work"	9 June 2007	10 November 2009
Bindi talks about Asian elephants, who have been the workhorses of Asia for centuries, and the role they play in today's world. Meanwhile, Steve and Wes travel to Sri Lanka and Thailand to study the elephant.
3	3	"American Beauties"	16 June 2007	11 November 2009
Bindi takes a trip across the United States, with dad Steve and mum Terri, to look at some of the unusual and interesting wildlife in the U.S.. They meet elk, bighorn sheep, black bears, bison, wolves, snakes, prairie dogs and American alligators.
4	4	"Cat Tracks"	16 June 2007	12 November 2009
Bindi and her dad Steve go to Africa to take a closer look at lions. While Steve works with vets in South Africa to attach satellite-tracking devices to a male lion, Bindi shows off some smaller cats.
5	5	"Aussie Icons"	23 June 2007	13 November 2009
Bindi takes a look, with her dad Steve and mum Terri, at some of the famous animals and landmarks of Australia, including koalas, kangaroos, wombats, echidnas, possums, kookaburras and crocodiles, as well as the Sydney Harbour Bridge and the Sydney Opera House.
6	6	"Mouthing Off"	23 June 2007	16 November 2009
Dental care is important to stay alive but in the wild, animals have to live with toothaches; in captivity, however, they are given the very best dental treatment. Bindi, Wes and Terri try some dentistry of their own in the Jungle Girl's Tree House.
7	7	"Dogs R Wild"	30 June 2007	17 November 2009
Bindi, Terri and Wes check out a training facility for police dogs and the domestic dog's wild cousins – African wild dogs, dingoes from Australia and Arctic wolves.
8	8	"End of the World"	30 June 2007	18 November 2009
Bindi travels to a land of cold and ice as her dad Steve takes her on a journey to the end of the world – the southern tip of South America and Antarctica – where they experience the unusual wildlife that thrives in the coldest part of the world.
9	9	"Like an Eagle"	7 July 2007	19 November 2009
Bindi, her dad Steve and her mum Terri explore the world of big birds like macaws, cockatoos, vultures, condors and eagles, and the role they have in the animal kingdom.
10	10	"Prince Rajah"	14 July 2007	20 November 2009
Bindi shows us some of the biggest cats in the world – lions and tigers. Some tigers become part of the Australia Zoo family, while dad Steve helps an injured lion to recovery in the United States.
11	11	"Lizard Tales"	8 September 2007	23 November 2009
Bindi takes a close look at lizards of all sizes, from tiny geckos to giant Komodo dragons.
12	12	"Saving the Whales"	13 October 2007	24 November 2009
The whale population needs our help, and Bindi dives into their world to investigate their gentle and peaceful nature.
13	13	"Animal I.C.U."	27 October 2007	25 November 2009
This episode highlights the Australia Zoo Wildlife Hospital, where each year thousands of injured animals are nursed back to health before being released back into the wild.
14	14	"Weirdest Wildlife"	10 November 2007	26 November 2009
Bindi checks out a few of the world's most unusual-looking animals, some of which look like they are made out of bits and pieces left over from other species.
15	15	"Boots, Bags and Belts"	17 November 2007	27 November 2009
Bindi and her family look into the danger to animals from poachers who kill them not for food, but to sell their body parts to be made illegally into boots, bags and belts.
16	16	"Animals on the Move"	1 December 2007	30 November 2009
Bindi's dad, Steve, helps transport reluctant animals, including some large and dangerous ones, from one place to another around the world.
17	17	"Odd Ops"	8 December 2007	1 December 2009
Bindi looks at some of the more unusual surgical operations that are performed on sick or injured animals, both in the wild and in captivity.
18	18	"Monkey in the Jungle"	15 December 2007	2 December 2009
Bindi looks at the differences between different types of primates – many of which are in big trouble.
19	19	"Crocodilians"	12 January 2008	3 December 2009
Bindi teaches us about a group of living dinosaurs called crocodilians.
20	20	"Treehouse Sleepover"	9 February 2008	14 December 2009
Bindi has her best friend Rosie and The Crocmen join her for a sleepover in her treehouse.
21	21	"Poached Eggs"	1 March 2008	4 December 2009
Bindi looks at two kinds of poachers – animals and humans.
22	22	"Snake in the Grass"	5 April 2008	7 December 2009
Bindi profiles both venomous and harmless snakes.
23	23	"Ocean's Ten"	19 April 2008	8 December 2009
Bindi counts down the ten most interesting creatures of the sea.
24	24	"Animal Mysteries"	3 May 2008	9 December 2009
Strange and interesting cases of animals including acupuncture on Asian elephants, animal instincts before a tsunami, and the hibernation of bears.
25	25	"Devil Island"	17 May 2008	10 December 2009
An epidemic could wipe out the entire population of Tasmanian devils.
26	26	"How Old Are They?"	31 May 2008	11 December 2009
Bindi investigates how long animals live in the wild compared to captivity.

=== Season 2 (2008) ===
No. overall	No. in season	Title	U.S. air date	Australian air date
27	1	"American Road Trip"	27 September 2008	2 November 2009
Bindi explores the desert states of Nevada, Utah and Arizona.
28	2	"Desert Highway"	4 October 2008	3 November 2009
Bindi continues her desert travels to Southern California and the Mojave Desert.
29	3	"Indonesian Safari"	11 October 2008	4 November 2009
Bindi takes a wildlife and cultural tour of Indonesia.
30	4	"Tigers on a Plane"	18 October 2008	5 November 2009
Bindi visits the Taman Safari Park in Jakarta where they have started a special breeding program to save endangered tigers.
31	5	"Treehouse Idol"	25 October 2008	6 November 2009
Bindi's treehouse is transformed into a dance studio for the finals of the Treehouse Idol competition.
32	6	"Vegas to LA"	20 December 2008	—
33	7	"Vegas to LA"	20 December 2008	—
On this adventure, Bindi travels famous Route 66 on a road trip from Las Vegas to Los Angeles.

== Related special ==
The series was introduced along with Bindi Irwin's first solo television program, My Daddy, the Crocodile Hunter, a documentary/memorial of Steve Irwin that aired on Animal Planet. It also talked about Bindi and her blooming career.

=== DVD releases ===
The complete series has been released by ABC (Australia) on PAL Region 4 DVD.

DVD name	Episodes	Australian Release Date
Volume 1 Episodes 1-4	Not Many Left; Elephants at Work; American Beauties; Cat Tracks	3 October 2007
Volume 2 Episodes 5-8	Aussie Icons; Mouthing Off; Dogs R Wild; End of the World	3 April 2008
Roar! Episodes 9-12	Like an Eagle; Prince Rajah; Lizard Tales; Saving the Whales	7 August 2008
Chill Out; Episodes 13-16	Animal I.C.U; Weirdest Wildlife; Boots, Bags and Belts; Animals on the Move	6 November 2008
Jungle Fever; Episodes 17-20	Odd Ops; Monkey in the Jungle; Crocodilians; Poached Eggs	2 April 2009
Wildlife Detective; Episodes 21-26	Snake in the Grass; Ocean's Ten; Animal Mysteries; Devil Island; How Old Are They? Treehouse Sleepover	2 July 2009
Road Trip; Episodes 27-31	American Road Trip; Desert Highway; Indonesian Safari; Tigers on a Plane; Treehouse Idol	5 November 2009
