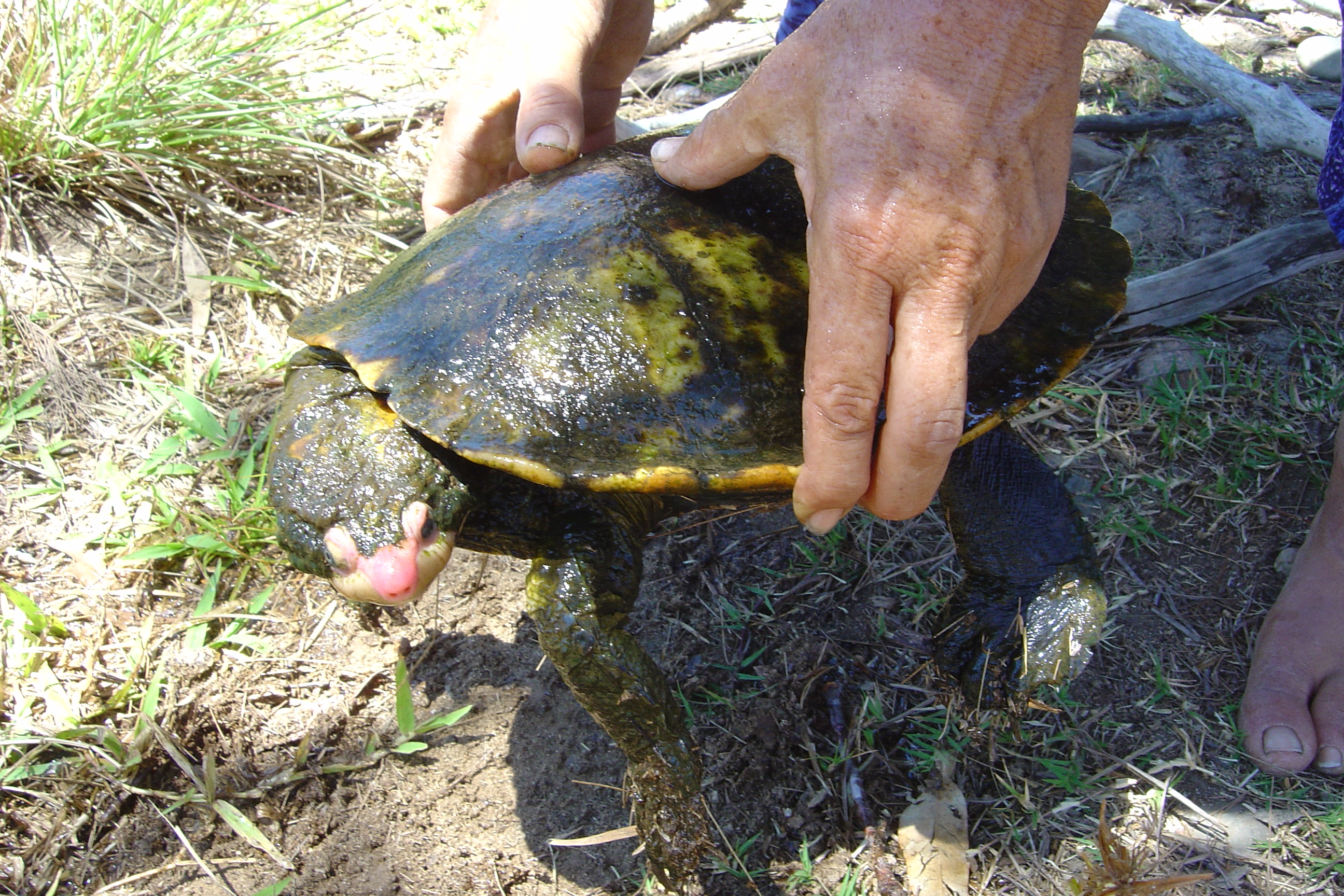

Scientific classification
- Kingdom: Animalia
- Phylum: Chordata
- Class: Reptilia
- Order: Testudines
- Suborder: Pleurodira
- Family: Chelidae
- Genus: Elseya
- Subgenus: Pelocomastes
- Species: E. irwini

Binomial name
- Elseya irwini Cann, 1997

= Irwin's turtle =

Species of turtle

Irwin's turtle (Elseya irwini) is a rare species of freshwater turtle in the family Chelidae. They are endemic to Australia, originating from the lower region of the Burdekin River area in northern Queensland, and were named after the late conservationist and television personality Steve Irwin.

== Discovery and etymology ==
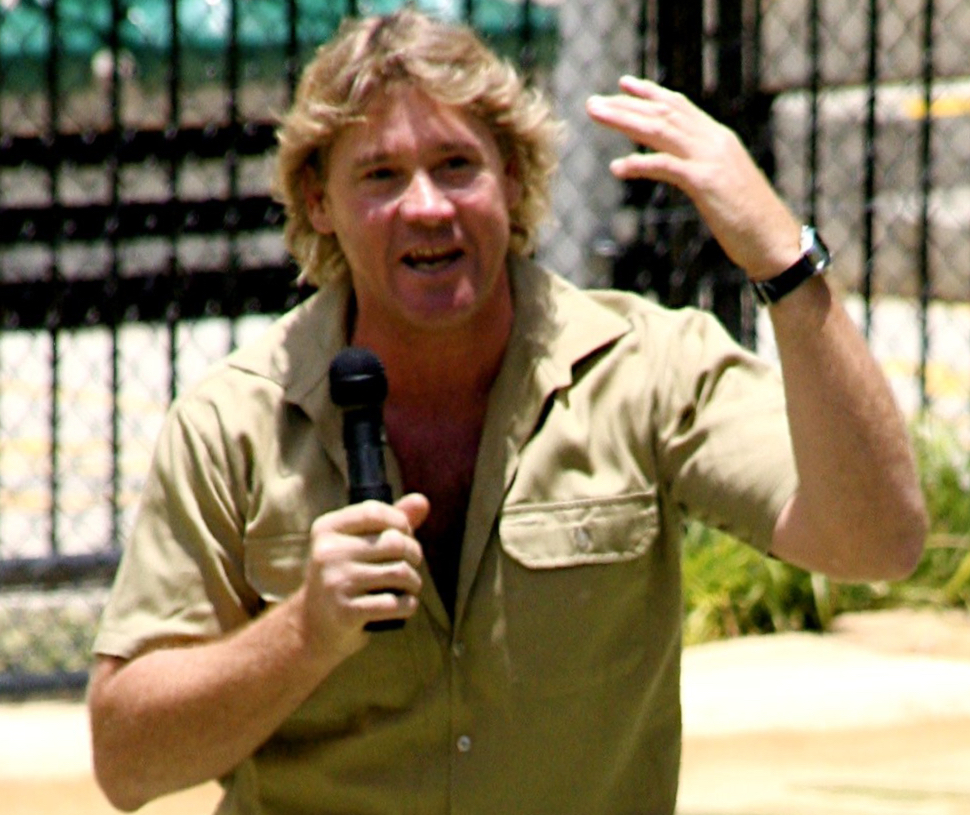
Steve Irwin

Naturalist Bob Irwin and his son, Steve, caught a female specimen of E. irwini on a crocodile-catching trip on the Burdekin River in 1990, on a fishing line. Steve Irwin took pictures and sent them to turtle expert John Cann, who verified that it was indeed a new species. The new species was named after Steve Irwin. (Note: Note that some sources state that it was named after Bob, or both Steve and Bob, but John Cann's original 1997 paper says Steve, and a 2006 Sydney Morning Herald article quoting him confirms this.)

== Description ==
The female of the species E. irwini has a pale head with a yellowish horny sheath on the crown. The pale colour present in the female of this species is due to a lack of multiple pigments which affect essentially all parts of the body. These individuals are known for their sturdy skull, which is supported by a narrow muscle called the pterygoid, creating a shielding for the skull and providing normal jaw functions.

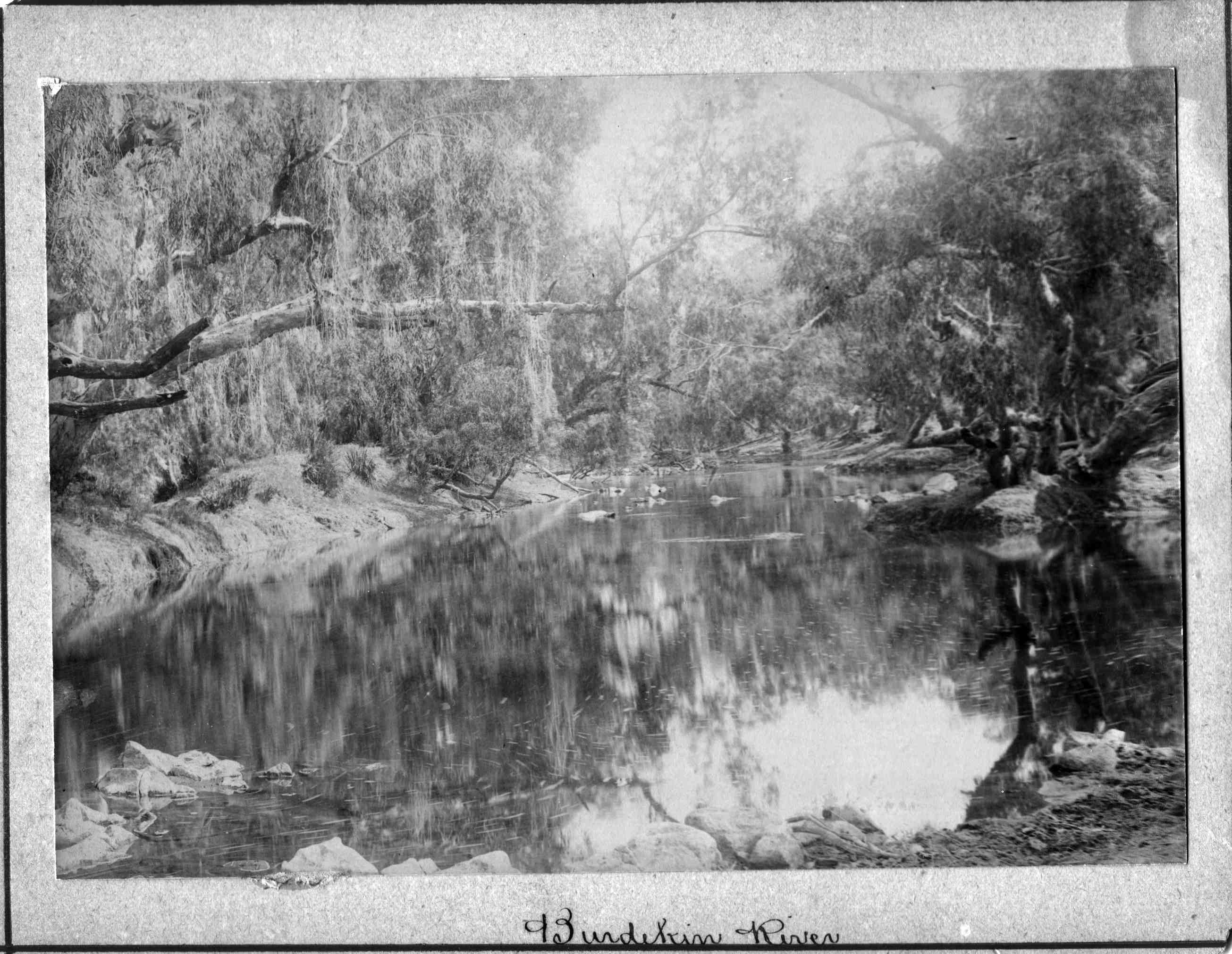
Burdekin River (1887)

== Subspecies ==
- E. i. irwini Cann, 1997
- E. i. stirlingi Joseph-Ouni et al., 2023

== Respiration ==
E. irwini, like some other turtles, can breathe underwater by taking water into its cloaca. The cloaca is a cavity at the end of the digestive tract containing a chamber with gill-like structures which allow for the diffusion of oxygen. Without this structure, this species of turtle would not be able to stay under water for long periods of time. Irwin's turtle needs to live in a source of water that is plentiful with oxygen. If the water has low oxygen levels or is filled with contaminants, the turtle has a lower chance of survival.

== Threats ==
The habitat of the Irwin's turtle has been impacted by the construction of the Burdekin Dam, which has caused a decline in water quality of the Burdekin River, which makes it hard for this species to survive and reproduce. Plans for the construction of Urannah Dam have been opposed, as this would cause further impacts and habitat contraction.

== Habitat and conservation status ==
E. irwini has been plentiful in Broken River and Bowen Creek. It had not been observed in the Lower Burdekin River in the 20 years preceding May 2022, until its presence was officially confirmed by researchers from James Cook University led by Cecilia Villacorta Rath.

The species has not been listed under the Environment Protection and Biodiversity Conservation Act 1999 (EPBC Act) owing to lack of data on the species.

In 2023, Steve Irwin's son, conservationist and television personality Robert Irwin, announced the first breeding of the turtle for zoological purposes at the Australia Zoo.

== See also ==
- List of organisms named after famous people (born 1950–1974)
