= Confessions of the Crocodile Hunter =

- The Crocodile Hunter episode
- Episode no.: Season 5 Episode 12
- Directed by: John Stainton
- Written by: Grant Dowling
- Original air date: June 18, 2004

"Confessions of the Crocodile Hunter" is the series finale of The Crocodile Hunter. It premiered on June 18, 2004. The episode discusses Irwin's accomplishments, and goes into deeper detail of the "Baby Bob" crocodile-feeding incident in early 2004. The episode achieved high ratings when it premiered, and marked the end of a week of new episodes, an event dubbed "Croc Week 2004". Although this was the last episode of the series proper, the show continued to run as specials until September 4, 2007 − over three years later, and exactly one year after Irwin's death.

== Plot ==
In this episode, the crew reviews Steve's life and struggles, and accomplishments. Steve and Terri also decide to go into depth about the "Baby Bob" incident that occurred earlier in the year, and telling how their baby was never in any real danger, and how the media exaggerated the story in part. They show us video footage that they took of the incident and show that Bob was further away from the crocodile than initially believed. It also contains archive footage from other episodes.
