= Croc Files =

- Created by: Steve Irwin; Terri Irwin; John Stainton
- Starring: Steve Irwin; Terri Irwin
- Countries of origin: Australia; United States
- Original language: English
- No. of seasons: 2
- No. of episodes: 56

Production
- Running time: 23 mins.

Original release
- Network: Discovery Kids; Animal Planet; NBC (Discovery Kids on NBC)
- Release: 28 June 1999 – 6 January 2001

Related
- The Crocodile Hunter; The Crocodile Hunter Diaries

Croc Files (also known as The Crocodile Hunter's Croc Files) is a wildlife documentary television series focusing on crocodiles. It first aired on cable TV channel Animal Planet. It was created as a spin-off to the original Crocodile Hunter and The Crocodile Hunter Diaries series hosted by Australian naturalist Steve Irwin and his wife Terri Irwin. Unlike its predecessor, the series was less hands-on in nature and was geared more for children. In the UK, it aired on ITV; in Australia, it was aired on Network Ten.

== Episodes ==
=== Season 1 (1999) ===
No. in series	Title	Original air date
1	"Charlie"	28 June 1999
2	"Websites"	1 September 1999
3	"Leaping Lizards"	2 September 1999
4	"Pythons"	3 September 1999
5	"Sharks"	6 September 1999
6	"Dangers of the Deep"	7 September 1999
7	"Turtle Rodeo"	8 September 1999
8	"Rodent's Rising"	9 September 1999
9	"It's a Jungle in Here"	10 September 1999
10	"Tasmanian Adventure"	13 September 1999
11	"Dingo Fence"	14 September 1999
12	"Freshies"	15 September 1999
13	"Deadly Australian Snakes"	16 September 1999
14	"Secret Valley"	17 September 1999
15	"Camel Training"	20 September 1999
16	"Animal Rehab"	21 September 1999
17	"Wild River Ride"	22 September 1999
18	"America's Pets and Pests"	23 September 1999
19	"Giant Snakes"	24 September 1999
20	"World's Deadly Four"	27 September 1999
21	"Marine Adventure"	28 September 1999
22	"Hidden Forest"	29 September 1999
23	"Making Crocodiles"	30 September 1999
24	"Dragons of the Outback"	1 October 1999
25	"Trouble on the Hoof"	4 October 1999
26	"Pigs in the Outback"	11 October 1999
27	"Fraser Island"	18 October 1999
28	"Gators"	25 October 1999

=== Season 2 (2000–01) ===
No. in series	Title	Original air date
1	"Lizards Rock"	3 June 2000
2	"Pacific Northwest"	24 June 2000
3	"When Nature Calls"	25 June 2000
4	"Monty"	26 June 2000
5	"Rattlers"	27 June 2000
6	"Valley of the Reptiles"	28 June 2000
7	"Aussie Legends"	29 June 2000
8	"Bugs in the System"	30 June 2000
9	"African Adventure"	1 July 2000
10	"Dangerous Americans"	8 July 2000
11	"Land of the Headhunters"	10 July 2000
12	"Mysteries of the Jungle"	11 July 2000
13	"Monkey Around"	12 July 2000
14	"Big, Gray and Dangerous"	13 July 2000
15	"My Favorite Crocodile"	14 July 2000
16	"Vipers"	15 July 2000
17	"On the Road Again"	22 July 2000
18	"Research Reptiles"	29 July 2000
19	"Marsupials"	5 August 2000
20	"In the Roar"	12 August 2000
21	"How to Catch a Crocodile"	19 August 2000
22	"Call of Nature"	26 August 2000
23	"Aussie Heroes"	2 September 2000
24	"Close Encounters"	9 September 2000
25	"Strange Africans"	16 September 2000
26	"Easy, Tiger"	2 December 2000
27	"A Grain of Sand"	9 December 2000
28	"Birds of a Feather"	6 January 2001

== See also ==
- List of programs broadcast by Animal Planet
