= CEnvP =

The Certified Environmental Practitioner (CEnvP) Scheme was established in 2004 by the Environment Institute of Australia and New Zealand (EIANZ). A Certified Environmental Practitioner is the highest grade of general environmental practice in Australia and New Zealand, and recognises outstanding practical experience and expertise, as well as high ethical standards.

CEnvP is a post nominal conferred upon environmental practitioners who successfully fulfil the requirements of a meticulous application process, which includes an online application form, registrar review, panel interview and subsequent review and ratification by selected members of the CEnvP Board. Intakes occur all year round.

The program aims to assist in ensuring that certain levels of professional environmental practice and ethics are met. By using certain application criteria and a set of ethical scenarios, each candidate is measured according to the same set of guidelines, helping to ensure a standardised level of practice, which in turn is expected to boost community and employer confidence.

Not all CEnvPs are based in Australia and New Zealand, and it is noted that CEnvPs are drawn from a number of industry sectors including government, education, engineering, law, and other public sectors.

Following certification, all CEnvPs must commit to and maintain high standards of professional and ethical conduct, as well as evidencing their continued professional development (CPD) by submitting a CPD Log biennially to retain their certification.

There is an online directory of all CEnvPs.

== Certification categories ==
- General environmental practitioners – CEnvP for those with over 5 years of professional environmental experience during the past 17 years in any related area of practice.
- Ecology specialist – for those with 10 years+ professional environmental experience in the ecology field during the past 17 years.
- Impact assessment specialist – for those with 10 years+ professional environmental experience during the past 17 years, at least 5 years must be directly related to the impact assessment field.
- Site contamination specialist – for those with 10 years of equivalent full-time experience in environmental practice during the past 17 years with 8 of those years being directly related to site contamination.
- Geomorphology specialist – for those with 10 years of equivalent full-time experience in the functional areas of geomorphology practice during the past 17 years.
- Heritage specialist – for those with 10 years of full-time equivalent experience in the functional areas of heritage management or research in Australian and /or New Zealand contexts or landscapes during the past 17 years.
- Social impact assessment specialist – for those 10 years of full-time equivalent experience in social practice during the past 17 years. A minimum of 5 years must be SIA specific.
- Impact assessment specialist plus NSW REAP module – for those that gain impact assessment certification plus are further assessed as having met the requirements of the New South Wales Government Registered Environmental Assessment Practitioner (REAP) scheme.

== Award ==
Between the years 2007 through to 2018, the CEnvP Scheme presented the Certified Environmental Practitioner of the Year Award recognising outstanding contributions by CEnvPs to environmental practice. In 2020, the award became the CEnvP Scheme Service Award to celebrate and recognise the exceptional volunteer contribution to the values, success, and development of the Certified Environmental Practitioner Scheme in the areas of positive leadership, technical contribution, initiative, and reliability.
