= My Daddy, the Crocodile Hunter =

- Directed by: John Stainton
- Starring: Bindi Irwin
- Country of origin: Australia; United States
- Original language: English

Production
- Running time: 50 min

Original release
- Network: Animal Planet
- Release: 8 June 2007

My Daddy, the Crocodile Hunter is a one-hour television documentary film that is hosted by then ten-year-old Bindi Irwin and details her life and growing career and also serves as a memorial for her father, famed naturalist and conservationist Steve Irwin, better known as The Crocodile Hunter, who died in 2006. She has inherited his legacy and continues his work.

It was originally broadcast on 8 June 2007 on Animal Planet. My Daddy, the Crocodile Hunter also served as an introduction to Bindi Irwin and her new TV series, Bindi the Jungle Girl.

== See also ==
- List of programs broadcast by Animal Planet
