= Steve Irwin =

Australian conservationist (1962–2006)

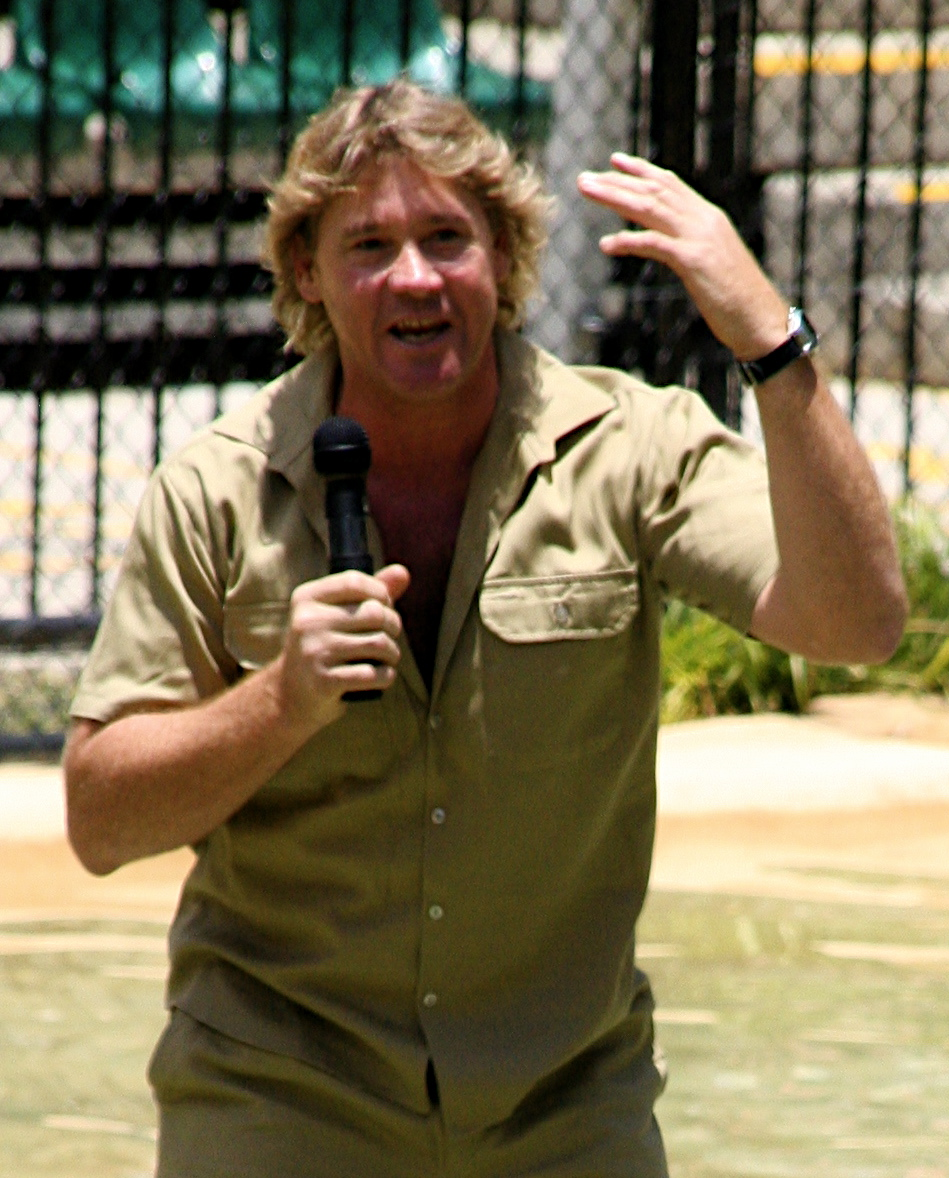
- Irwin in 2005
- Born: Stephen Robert Irwin; 22 February 1962; Upper Ferntree Gully, Victoria, Australia
- Died: 4 September 2006 (aged 44); Batt Reef, Queensland, Australia
- Cause of death: Stingray injury to the heart
- Resting place: Australia Zoo, Beerwah, Queensland
- Occupations: Naturalist; zoologist; conservationist; television personality; herpetologist
- Years active: 1991–2006
- Spouse: Terri Raines (m. 1992)
- Children: Bindi; Robert
- Father: Bob Irwin
- Website: australiazoo.com.au

Stephen Robert Irwin (22 February 1962 – 4 September 2006) was an Australian conservationist, environmentalist, zookeeper, television personality, and wildlife educator. Nicknamed the "Crocodile Hunter", he is regarded as an Australian cultural icon, and as one of the greatest conservationists.

Irwin grew up around crocodiles and other reptiles and was taught about them by his father, Bob. He achieved international fame in the late 1990s through The Crocodile Hunter, an internationally broadcast wildlife documentary series that he co-hosted with his wife, Terri. The couple also hosted Croc Files, The Crocodile Hunter Diaries, and New Breed Vets. They co-owned and operated Australia Zoo, founded by Irwin's parents in Beerwah, Queensland. They had two children, Bindi and Robert.

On 4 September 2006, Irwin died from an injury caused by a stingray while filming an underwater documentary in the Great Barrier Reef. His death became international news and was met with expressions of shock and grief from fans, the media, governments, and non-profit organisations. Numerous parks, zoos, streets, the vessel MY Steve Irwin, the snail species Crikey steveirwini, and the asteroid 57567 Crikey have been named in his honour. The Irwin family continues to operate Australia Zoo.

== Early life ==
Stephen Robert Irwin was born on 22 February 1962 to Lyn (d. 2000) and Bob Irwin (b. 1939) in Upper Ferntree Gully, a suburb of Melbourne. His parents were both of Irish descent. His great-grandfather on his father's side, Joseph Irwin, a carpenter born in Dublin, immigrated to Australia in 1876 and married Theresa Byrne, who was also from Dublin. Lyn was a maternity nurse, and Bob is a former plumber and amateur herpetologist who collected reptiles. Irwin developed an early interest in reptiles, particularly venomous snakes and lizards, and often collected them despite his father's advice. On one occasion, he reportedly brought a red-bellied black snake home on a public bus, transporting it in the driver's esky.

He moved with his parents to the Sunshine Coast, Queensland, in 1970, where he attended Landsborough State School and Caloundra State High School. Irwin described his father as a wildlife expert interested in herpetology, while his mother was a wildlife rehabilitator. After the family's move to Queensland, Bob and Lyn Irwin opened Beerwah Reptile Park, which was later known as the Queensland Reptile and Fauna Park in the 1980s, where Irwin grew up around crocodiles and other reptiles.

Irwin became involved with the park in a number of ways, including daily animal feeding and care and maintenance work. On his sixth birthday, he was given a 12-foot (4 m) scrub python. He began handling crocodiles at the age of nine after his father had educated him on reptiles from an early age. Also at age nine, he wrestled his first crocodile under his father's supervision. He later volunteered for Queensland's East Coast Crocodile Management program and captured more than 100 crocodiles, some of which were relocated while others were housed at the family park. Irwin took over management of the park in 1991 and renamed it Australia Zoo in 1998.

== Personal life ==
On 6 October 1991, Irwin met Terri Raines, an American naturalist from Eugene, Oregon, who was visiting wildlife rehabilitation facilities in Australia and had decided to visit the zoo. According to the couple, it was love at first sight. Raines said at the time, "I thought there was no one like this anywhere in the world. He sounded like an environmental Tarzan, a larger-than-life superhero guy". They were engaged four months later and were married at the First United Methodist Church of Eugene on 4 June 1992. They had two children: a daughter, Bindi Sue Irwin (born 24 July 1998), and a son, Robert Clarence Irwin (born 1 December 2003). Bindi Sue is jointly named after two of Irwin's favourite animals: Bindi, a saltwater crocodile, and Sui, a Staffordshire Bull Terrier. Robert is named after Irwin's father Bob and Terri's father Clarence.

Irwin once described his daughter Bindi as "the reason [he] was put on the Earth". His wife said, "The only thing that could ever keep him away from the animals he loves are the people he loves even more". Although the Irwins were happily married, they did not wear wedding rings; they believed that in their line of work, jewellery could pose a hazard to them or the animals. Irwin frequently said that if he was to be remembered for anything, he hoped it would be for being a good father.

On 11 February 2000, Irwin's mother Lyn was killed in a car accident. In an online tribute, he called her "the most beautiful, loving, nurturing, and caring person to have ever blessed this world".

== Career ==
=== The Crocodile Hunter and related work ===
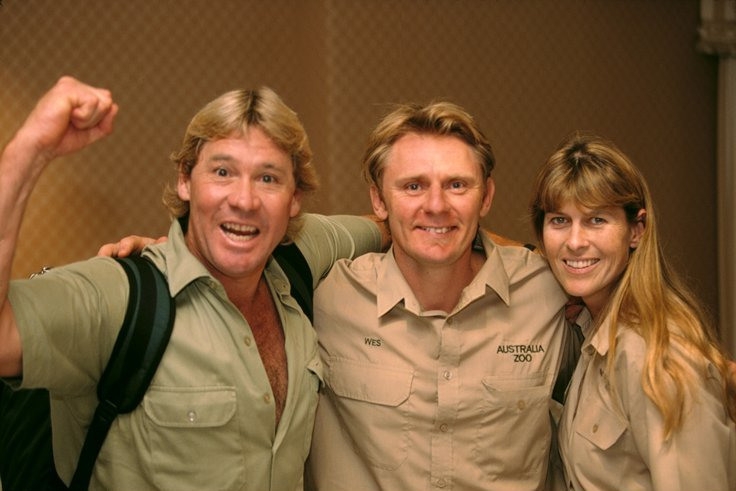
Irwin and Terri with Wes Mannion, the other cast member of The Crocodile Hunter

Irwin and his wife Terri spent their honeymoon trapping crocodiles together. Film footage of the trip, taken by John Stainton, became the first episode of The Crocodile Hunter. The series debuted on Australian television in 1996 and reached North American audiences the following year. The Crocodile Hunter became successful in the United States, the UK, and more than 130 other countries, reaching an estimated 500 million viewers. Irwin's exuberant and enthusiastic presenting style, broad Australian accent, signature khaki shorts, and catchphrase "Crikey!" became known internationally.

Animal Planet ended The Crocodile Hunter with a three‑hour series finale titled "Steve's Last Adventure". It featured footage of Irwin's travels in locations including the Himalayas, the Yangtze River, Borneo, and the Kruger National Park.

After The Crocodile Hunter, Irwin appeared in other Animal Planet documentaries, including Croc Files, The Crocodile Hunter Diaries, and New Breed Vets. Animal Planet also created the annual Croc Week marathon, broadcast for a full week in mid‑June each year from 2000 to 2007. During a January 2006 interview on The Tonight Show with Jay Leno, Irwin announced that Discovery Kids would be developing a show for his daughter, Bindi Sue, a plan realised after his death as Bindi the Jungle Girl.

=== Other television and film work ===
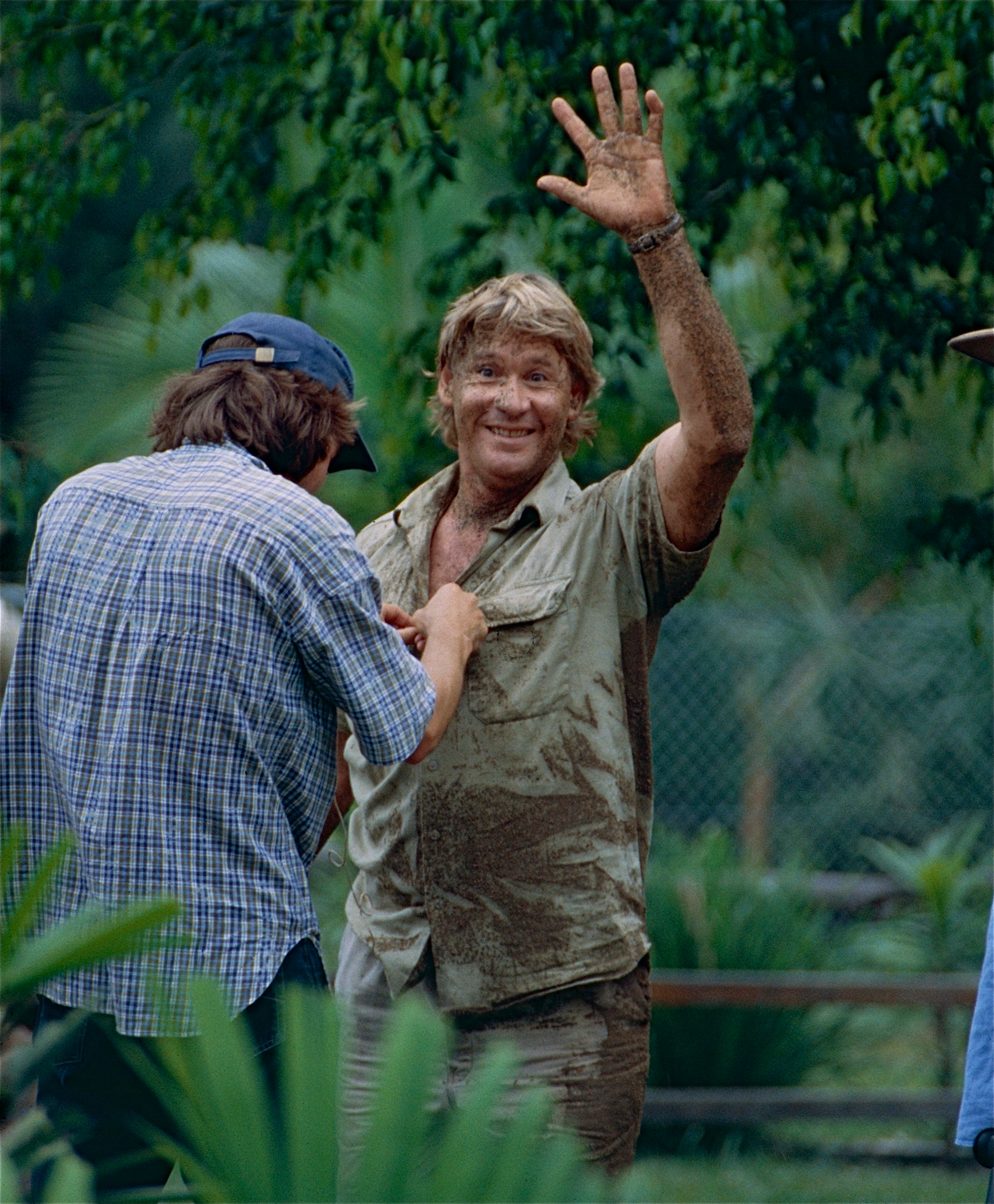
Irwin in 2000

In 1998, Irwin continued his television career, working with director Mark Strickson to present The Ten Deadliest Snakes in the World. He appeared on several episodes of The Tonight Show with Jay Leno. A 2000 FedEx commercial featuring Irwin lightheartedly addressed the risk of occupational death from snakebite and the notion that FedEx could have prevented it.

Australia Zoo was upgraded with the Animal Planet Crocoseum, a rainforest aviary, and the Tiger Temple. Irwin said he was considering opening an Australia Zoo in Las Vegas, Nevada, and possibly at other sites around the world.

In 2001, Irwin appeared in a cameo role in the Eddie Murphy film Dr. Dolittle 2. His only starring feature film role was in 2002's The Crocodile Hunter: Collision Course, released to mixed reviews. In the film, Irwin portrayed himself and performed numerous stunts. The plot centres on Irwin mistaking CIA agents for poachers and attempting to stop them from capturing a crocodile that has swallowed a tracking transmitter. The film won the Best Family Feature Film award for a comedy at the Young Artist Awards. It was produced on a budget of about US$12 million and grossed $33 million. To promote the film, Irwin appeared in an animated short produced by Animax Entertainment for Intermix.

In 2002, Irwin and his family appeared in the Wiggles video/DVD release Wiggly Safari, filmed at Australia Zoo and featuring songs inspired by Australian wildlife. Irwin fronted an advertising campaign for The Ghan in 2003, a passenger train operating between Adelaide, Alice Springs, and Darwin. A Pacific National NR class locomotive was named Steve Irwin as part of the campaign.

=== Environmentalism ===
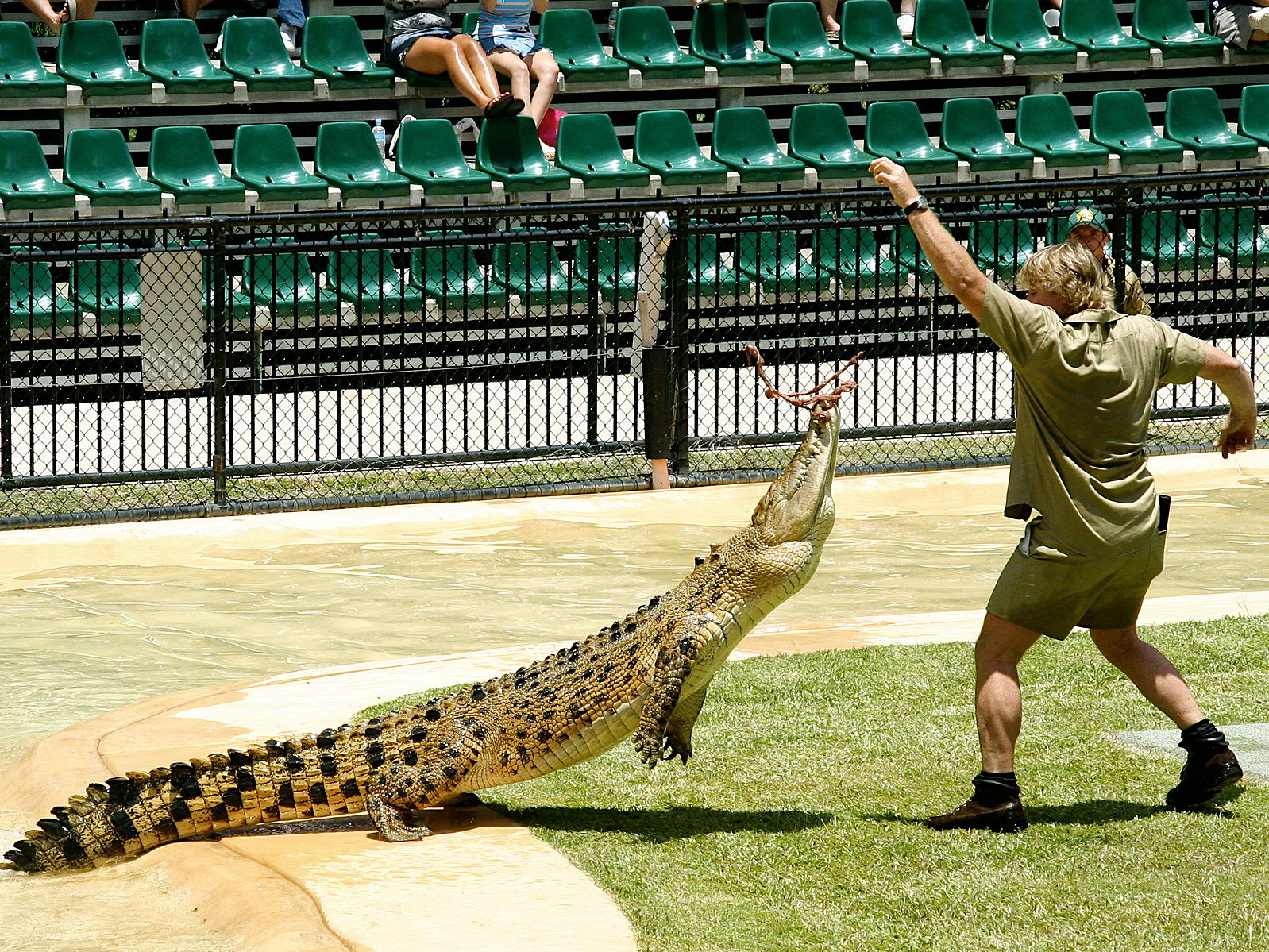
Irwin (right) feeding a crocodile at Australia Zoo in 2005

Irwin was a passionate conservationist and believed in promoting environmentalism by sharing his enthusiasm for the natural world rather than preaching. He was concerned with the conservation of endangered species and with land clearing that caused habitat loss. He considered conservation the most important part of his work: "I consider myself a wildlife warrior. My mission is to save the world's endangered species". Irwin bought "large tracts of land" in Australia, Vanuatu, Fiji, and the United States, which he described as "like national parks", and stressed that individuals could make a difference.

Irwin founded the Steve Irwin Conservation Foundation, which became an independent charity and was later renamed Wildlife Warriors Worldwide. He also helped establish International Crocodile Rescue, the Lyn Irwin Memorial Fund (named in memory of his mother), and the Iron Bark Station Wildlife Rehabilitation Facility.

Irwin urged people to take part in considerate tourism and avoid supporting illegal poaching by refusing items such as turtle shells or shark-fin soup.

Sir David Attenborough was an inspiration to Irwin, according to his widow. When presenting a Lifetime Achievement Award to Attenborough at the British National Television Awards on 31 October 2006, Terri said, "If there's one person who directly inspired my husband it's the person being honoured tonight.... [Steve's] real, true love was conservation – and the influence of tonight's recipient in preserving the natural world has been immense". Attenborough praised Irwin for introducing many people to wildlife, saying, "He taught them how wonderful and exciting it was[;] he was a born communicator".

=== Sporting activities ===
Irwin enjoyed mixed martial arts competitions and trained with Greg Jackson in the fighting and grappling system of Gaidojutsu.

Irwin was an avid cricket fan. During his visit to Sri Lanka, he played cricket with local children and said "I love cricket" and "It's a shame we have to go catch some snakes now". This appeared in the Crocodile Hunter episode "Island of the Snakes".

Having grown up in Essendon, Irwin supported the Essendon Bombers in the Australian Football League. He took part in an Australian Rules football promotion in Los Angeles during "Australia Week" in early 2006. After his death, ESPN.com displayed a photograph of Irwin wearing a Bombers guernsey in its Bottom 10 ranking of the worst Division I FBS college football teams after Week 1 of the season.

Having lived in Queensland for most of his life, Irwin also supported rugby league. As a teenager, he played as a second-rower for the Caloundra Sharks, and as an adult he was a passionate Brisbane Broncos fan. On one occasion, after arriving at training, he asked to tackle the largest player, Shane Webcke. Despite being thrown to the ground, he remained jovial.

Irwin also supported rugby union and was a fan of the national team, the Wallabies. He once wore a Wallaby jersey during a demonstration at the zoo. A behind-the-scenes episode of The Crocodile Hunter showed Irwin and the crew finding a petrol station in remote Namibia to watch the Wallabies defeat France in the 1999 Rugby World Cup Final.

Irwin was also a talented surfer.

=== Media campaigns ===
A poster from Irwin's Quarantine Matters! campaign

Irwin took part in several media campaigns. He worked with the Australian Quarantine and Inspection Service to promote Australia's strict quarantine requirements, with advertisements and posters featuring slogans such as, "Quarantine Matters! Don't muck with it". His payments for these campaigns were directed into his wildlife fund.

In 2004, Irwin was appointed ambassador for The Ghan when the line was extended to Darwin. He was sponsored by Toyota for a period.

Irwin promoted Australian tourism, particularly Queensland tourism. In 2002, Australia Zoo was voted Queensland's top tourist attraction. His popularity in the United States meant he often promoted Australia as a destination there. As part of the United States' "Australia Week" celebrations in January 2006, Irwin appeared at UCLA's Pauley Pavilion in Los Angeles.

=== Search and rescue in Mexico ===
In November 2003, while filming a documentary on sea lions off the Baja California Peninsula in Mexico, Irwin heard via radio that two scuba divers were missing in the area. Irwin and his crew suspended filming to assist in the search. His team's divers joined the rescue divers, and Irwin used his vessel to patrol the waters around the island where the incident occurred. He also used his satellite communications system to call in a rescue plane. On the second day of the search, kayakers found one of the divers, Scott Jones, on a narrow rock ledge. Irwin and a crew member escorted him to Irwin's boat. The other lost diver, Katie Vrooman, was found dead later that day by a search plane.

== Death and funeral ==
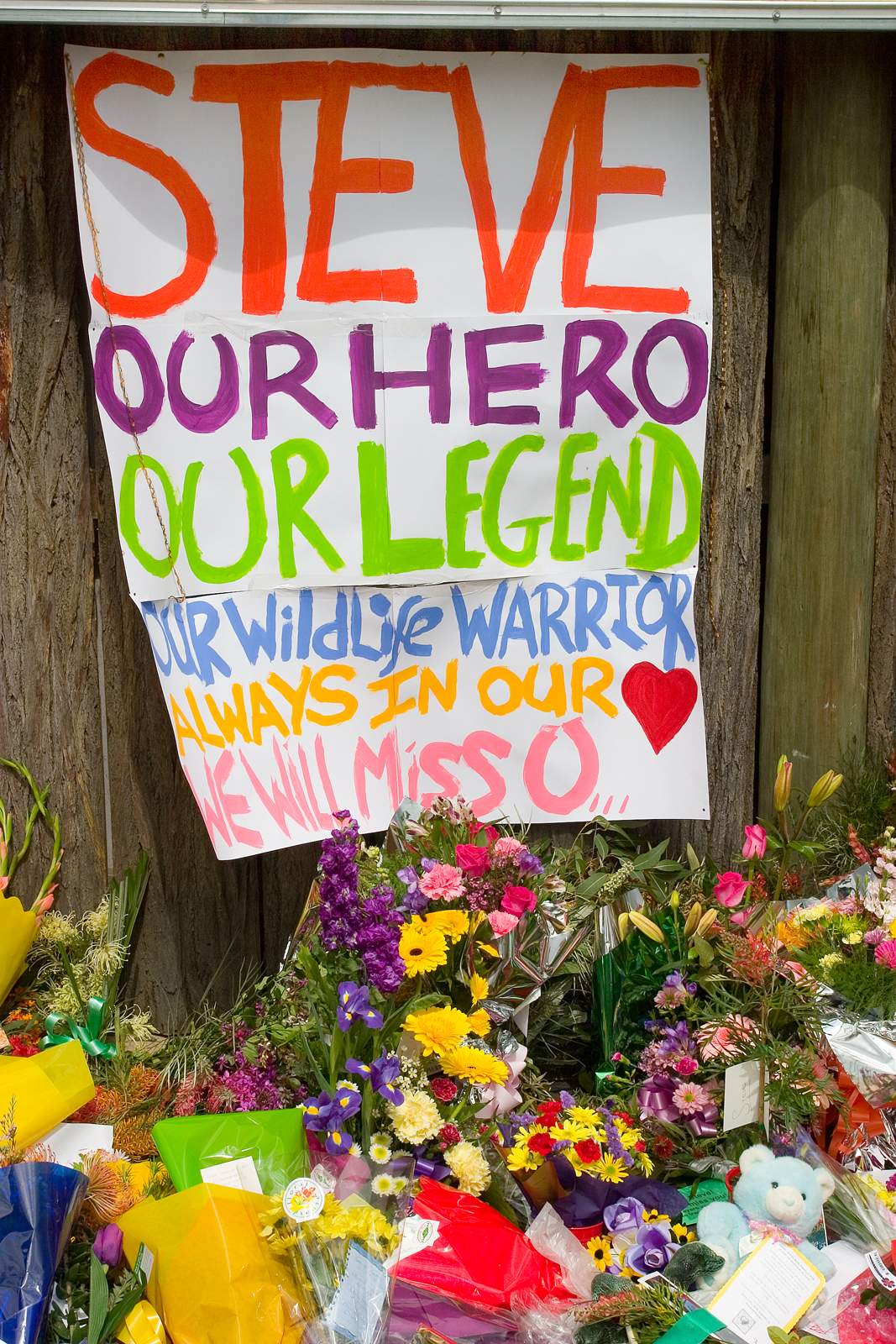
Flowers left in Irwin's memory the day after his death

Irwin died on 4 September 2006 at Batt Reef, near Port Douglas, Queensland, after being pierced in the chest by a short-tail stingray barb while filming in the Great Barrier Reef with Philippe Cousteau Jr. The stinger penetrated his thoracic wall and caused massive trauma. He had been taking part in the production of the documentary series Ocean's Deadliest. Irwin's death is believed to be the only fatality from a stingray captured on video. His death was met with shock and grief from fans, the media, governments, and non-profit organisations.

A private funeral service took place on 9 September. Irwin was buried in a private ceremony at Australia Zoo later that day. A public memorial service was held in Australia Zoo's 5,500-seat Crocoseum on 30 September. It was broadcast live and is estimated to have been viewed by more than 300 million people worldwide.

== Public image and incidents ==
On 2 January 2004, Irwin carried his one-month-old son, Robert, in his arm while hand-feeding a chicken carcass to Murray, a 3.8-metre (12 ft 6 in) saltwater crocodile. The infant was close to the crocodile, and comparisons were made in the press to Michael Jackson dangling his son outside a German hotel window. Some child welfare groups, animal rights groups, and some of Irwin's television viewers criticised the action as irresponsible and tantamount to child abuse. Irwin apologised on the US NBC show Today. He and his wife publicly said that Irwin was in complete control of the situation, as he had dealt with crocodiles since childhood, and that neither he nor his son were in danger. Irwin also showed footage of the event taken from a different angle, demonstrating that they were farther from the crocodile than they appeared in the publicised clip. Terri said their child was in no more danger than one being taught to swim. No charges were filed; according to one journalist, Irwin told officials he would not repeat the action. The incident prompted the Queensland Government to change its crocodile-handling laws, banning children and untrained adults from entering crocodile enclosures.

In June 2004, allegations were made that Irwin disturbed wildlife, including whales, seals and penguins, while filming The Crocodile Hunter episode "Ice Breaker" in Antarctica. The matter was closed without charges being laid.

After questions arose in 2003 about Irwin being paid $175,000 worth of taxpayers' money to appear in a television advertisement and his possible political ties, Irwin told the Australian Broadcasting Corporation (ABC) that he was a conservationist and did not choose sides in politics. His comments describing Australian Prime Minister John Howard as the "greatest leader in the world" attracted criticism in the media.

In response to questions of Australia's problems with overgrazing, salinity, and erosion, Irwin said: "Cows have been on our land for so long that Australia has evolved to handle those big animals". The Sydney Morning Herald concluded that his message was confusing and amounted to "eating roos and crocs is bad for tourism, and more cruel than eating other animals".

== Legacy ==
=== Posthumous movie and television appearances ===
Irwin provided his voice for the animated film Happy Feet, playing an elephant seal named Trev. The film was posthumously released in November 2006 and was dedicated to Irwin, who had died during post-production two months earlier. Another previously incomplete scene, featuring Irwin voicing an albatross and essentially playing himself, was restored for the DVD release.

In 2007, a special episode of The Crocodile Hunter was produced in tribute to him: Crikey! What an Adventure: An Intimate Look at the Life of Steve Irwin. The documentary features archive footage from The Crocodile Hunter. Later that year, Bindi released the documentary My Daddy, the Crocodile Hunter in his memory. Irwin appears in several episodes of Bindi the Jungle Girl through archive footage. Archive footage has also been used in the television series Crikey! It's the Irwins, which began airing in 2018.

=== Steve Irwin Day ===
Steve Irwin Day is an annual event celebrated at Australia Zoo on 15 November, honouring Irwin's life and legacy. The date was chosen because it falls on the birthday of one of Irwin's favourite animals, a tortoise from the Galápagos Islands. Events include fundraising for Wildlife Warriors to support Irwin's conservation work, and Australia Zoo staff wearing khaki uniforms in his memory.

=== Honours ===
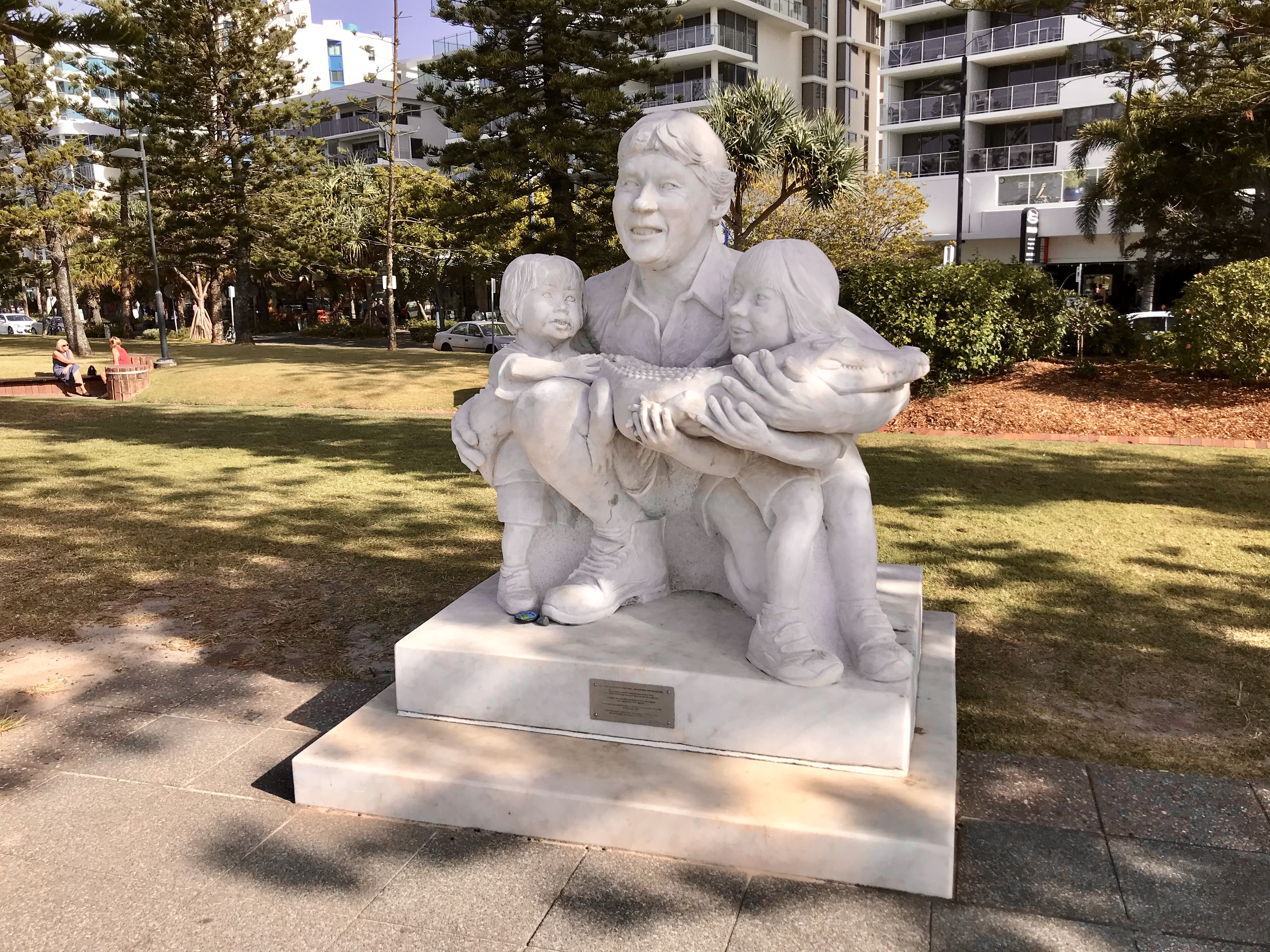
Steve Irwin Memorial, Mooloolaba, Queensland

In 1997, while on a fishing trip on the Queensland coast with his father, Irwin discovered a new species of turtle. Herpetologist John Cann named it Irwin's turtle (Elseya irwini) in his honour. Another newly discovered Australian animal – a species of air-breathing land snail, Crikey steveirwini, was named after him in 2009. In 2025, a species of snake native to India's Nicobar Islands, Lycodon irwini, was named in his honour.

Irwin received the Centenary Medal from the Australian government in 2001 for his "service to global conservation and to Australian tourism". In 2004, he was recognised as Tourism Export of the Year. He was nominated for Australian of the Year in 2004, but the award went to cricket captain Steve Waugh, while Irwin was named 2004 Queensland Australian of the Year. Shortly before his death, Irwin was to be appointed an adjunct professor at the University of Queensland's School of Integrative Biology. On 14 November 2007, he was awarded the adjunct professorship posthumously. In 2007, Irwin was posthumously inducted into the Logie Hall of Fame.

In May 2007, the government of Rwanda announced that it would name a baby gorilla after Irwin as a tribute to his conservation work. Also in 2007, the state government of Kerala, India, named the Crocodile Rehabilitation and Research Centre at Neyyar Wildlife Sanctuary in his honour. Terri objected that the action had been taken without her permission and asked the Kerala government in 2009 to stop using Irwin's name and images, a request with which the state government complied later that year.

After Irwin’s death, Mark Townend, CEO of RSPCA Queensland, described him as a "modern-day Noah". British naturalist David Bellamy praised Irwin's skills as a natural historian and media performer. Canadian environmentalist David Suzuki paid tribute to Irwin, noting that "[h]umanity will not protect that which we fear or do not understand. Steve Irwin helped us understand those things that many people thought were a nuisance at best, a horror at worst. That made him a great educator and conservationist".

The vessel MV Robert Hunter, owned by the Sea Shepherd Conservation Society, was renamed MY Steve Irwin after his death. Shortly before he died, Irwin had been considering joining Sea Shepherd's 2007–2008 voyage to Antarctica to disrupt Japanese whaling activity. Following his death, the organisation proposed renaming their vessel, and Terri endorsed the idea. Regarding the ship and its new name, she said, "If Steve were alive, he'd be aboard with them!"

Irwin was inducted into the Queensland Business Leaders Hall of Fame in 2009, recognised for international entrepreneurship in business and wildlife conservation, and for significantly contributing to Queensland's international reputation. In 2015, he received a posthumous Queensland Greats Awards. In 2017, it was announced that Irwin would be posthumously honoured with a star on the Hollywood Walk of Fame. The star was unveiled on 26 April 2018. On 22 February 2019, the 57th anniversary of Irwin's birth, Google released a Google Doodle commemorating him in the form of a slideshow.

=== Within Australia ===
In the years after his death, Irwin's likeness, catchphrases, mannerisms, and contributions made him synonymous with Australia among both citizens and foreigners. His likeness has been used by the Queensland Government to promote tourism, with Australia Zoo regarded as one of the state's most iconic tourist destinations. His son Robert became a spokesperson for Queensland's tourism board in 2020.

Glass House Mountains Road, which runs along the front of Australia Zoo, was renamed Steve Irwin Way by the Queensland Government as a tribute. The renaming was announced three weeks after Irwin's death.

In 2022, following the death of Queen Elizabeth II, some Australians voiced support for featuring Irwin on the nation's currency instead of King Charles III. Two citizens filed separate petitions to gather support for the proposal. When asked about the matter, prime minister Anthony Albanese declined to take a position, saying it was not the right time to discuss who would appear on the currency in the immediate aftermath of the Queen's death.

== Filmography ==
=== Film ===
Steve Irwin' film credits
Year	Film	Character	Description
2001	Dr. Dolittle 2	Himself	Cameo appearance
2002	The Crocodile Hunter: Collision Course	Himself	Main role
2002	The Wiggles Wiggly Safari	Himself	Direct-to-video
2006	Happy Feet	Trev (voice)	Posthumous release; final film role (Dedicated in memory)

=== Television ===
Steve Irwin' television credits
Year	Television show	Character	Description
1996–2007	The Crocodile Hunter	Himself	78 episodes
1997	Crocs Down Under	Himself	Television special
1999–2001	Croc Files	Himself	56 episodes
2001	The Ten Deadliest Snakes in the World	Himself	Television special
2002–2006	The Crocodile Hunter Diaries	Himself	96 episodes
2002	Steve Irwin's Ghosts of War	Himself	Television special
2002	Mystery Hunters	Himself	1 episode
2002	Lights! Croc! Action!	Himself	Television special
2002	Up Over Down Under	Himself	Television special
2003	Croc Hunter LIVE!	Himself	Television special
2004	Croc Live	Himself	Television special
2004	Ice Breaker	Himself	Television special
2004	Confessions of the Crocodile Hunter	Himself	Television special
2005	New Breed Vets with Steve Irwin	Himself	6 episodes
2005	Steve's Last Adventure	Himself	Television special
2006	Steve Irwin's Great Escapes	Himself	Miniseries (two episodes)
2006	5 Takes: Pacific Rim	Himself	One episode
2007	Ocean's Deadliest	Himself	Television special Released posthumously
2007	Crikey! What an Adventure: An Intimate Look at the Life of Steve Irwin	Himself	Television special Released posthumously
2007	My Daddy, the Crocodile Hunter	Himself	Television special Released posthumously
2007	Secrets of the Crocodile	Himself	Television special Released posthumously
2007–2008	Bindi the Jungle Girl	Himself (via archived footage)	Television series Released posthumously
2018–2022	Crikey! It's the Irwins	Himself (via archived footage)	Television series Released posthumously
