= The Crocodile Hunter Diaries =

- Created by: Steve Irwin
- Starring: Steve Irwin; Terri Irwin
- Countries of origin: Australia; United States
- Original language: English
- No. of seasons: 3
- No. of episodes: 96

Production
- Running time: 45–48 minutes

Original release
- Network: Animal Planet
- Release: 2 January 2002 – 19 January 2006

Related
- The Crocodile Hunter; Croc Files

The Crocodile Hunter Diaries is a wildlife documentary television series first aired on cable TV channel Animal Planet. It was created as a spin-off to the original The Crocodile Hunter series hosted by Australian naturalist Steve Irwin and his wife Terri Irwin. In the UK it was aired on ITV. In Australia it was aired on Network Ten.

The show is more focused around the everyday lives of Steve, Terri, and the employees of Australia Zoo. The first season (filmed in 1998 and aired in 2002) covered, among other things, Terri's pregnancy with her and Steve's first child Bindi, medical problems with Steve's dog Sui, the construction of the Crocoseum, daily ups and downs experienced by zoo staff on the job and animal rescue adventures.

== Episodes ==
=== Season 1 (2002) ===
This season was shot in 1998.

No. in series	Title	Original air date
1	"Pilot"	2 January 2002
2	"Wild About Harry"	7 February 2002
3	"What's the Buzz?"	14 February 2002
4	"Steve's Birthday"	27 February 2002
5	"Operation Sui"	6 March 2002
6	"Kelly's Big Day"	13 March 2002
7	"It's a Girl"	29 May 2002
8	"Mates"	5 June 2002
9	"Pelican Wars"	24 June 2002
10	"Gator Raid"	25 June 2002
11	"The Big Wet"	26 June 2002
12	"Day of the Devils"	3 July 2002
13	"Mary's Farewell"	10 July 2002

=== Season 2 (2003) ===
This season was shot between 2001 and 2003.

No. in series	No. in season	Title	Original air date
14	1	"Tracie's Shadow"	6 January 2003
15	2	"Bundle of Ivory"	7 January 2003
16	3	"Ivory Returns"	8 January 2003
17	4	"Baby Bindi"	13 January 2003
18	5	"Road to Recovery"	14 January 2003
19	6	"Pink Gloves"	15 January 2003
20	7	"Concrete and Crocodiles"	16 January 2003
21	8	"Acco's Cool"	20 January 2003
22	9	"Zoo Babies"	20 January 2003
23	10	"A Jellybean for Jody"	27 January 2003
24	11	"Zoo Mates"	19 February 2003
25	12	"Dancing with the Devils"	9 April 2003
26	13	"Surgical Marvels"	16 April 2003
27	14	"Mateship"	30 April 2003
28	15	"Wombats, Kangaroos, & Koalas"	7 May 2003
29	16	"Grumpy Gators"	14 May 2003
30	17	"Aliens in the Outback"	21 May 2003
31	18	"Breaking the Record"	28 May 2003
32	19	"Growing Pains"	2 June 2003
33	20	"Under Pressure"	3 June 2003
34	21	"Steve's Dream"	4 June 2003
35	22	"Working with Legends"	5 June 2003
36	23	"A Plethora of Pythons"	6 June 2003
37	24	"Croc Hunter LIVE!"	9 June 2003
38	25	"Reticulated Babies"	9 June 2003
39	26	"Emu Escape"	10 June 2003
40	27	"Risky Rescues"	11 June 2003
41	28	"Tazzie Devil Tango"	12 June 2003
42	29	"The Devil You Know"	13 June 2003
43	30	"Vet Check"	16 June 2003
44	31	"Sore Like an Eagle"	17 June 2003
45	32	"Pressure Point"	June 18, 2003
46	33	"Wildlife Inferno"	18 June 2003
47	34	"Ironbark Burning"	19 June 2003
48	35	"My Best Friends"	20 June 2003
49	36	"My Girls"	23 June 2003
50	37	"Teamwork"	24 June 2003
51	38	"Marsupial Mayhem"	25 June 2003
52	39	"Gators in Love"	26 June 2003
53	40	"Gators on Guard"	27 June 2003
54	41	"Camel Crisis"	30 June 2003
55	42	"Foxy Lady"	1 July 2003
56	43	"Crowded House"	2 July 2003
57	44	"Off the Record"	3 July 2003
58	45	"Building a Dream"	4 July 2003
59	46	"Battle of the Pythons"	9 July 2003
60	47	"To the Rescue"	16 July 2003
61	48	"Something's Burning"	30 July 2003
62	49	"Wombat Woes"	19 August 2003
63	50	"Koala Mates"	15 September 2003
64	51	"At Loggerheads"	22 September 2003
65	52	"Win One, Lose One"	22 December 2003
66	53	"Croc Xmas"	22 December 2003

=== Season 3 (2004−06) ===
This season was shot between 2003 and 2004.

No. in series	No. in season	Title	Original air date
67	1	"Emu Rescue"	19 January 2004
68	2	"Croc Live"	6 February 2004
69	3	"A New Zoo"	3 March 2004
70	4	"British Gorillas"	10 March 2004
71	5	"Backstage Bedlam"	17 March 2004
72	6	"South Pacific Croc Rescue"	24 March 2004
73	7	"Raiders of the Nest"	30 March 2004
74	8	"Celebrities and Practical Jokes"	30 March 2004
75	9	"Future Footprints"	7 April 2004
76	10	"Wild Boys, Wild Crocs"	21 April 2004
77	11	"Girls Can Catch Crocs Too"	28 April 2004
78	12	"Croc School for Bindi"	5 May 2004
79	13	"Matters of Life and Death"	12 May 2004
80	14	"Steve's Singapore Safari"	19 May 2004
81	15	"Days of Disaster"	9 June 2004
82	16	"Crocoseum"	30 June 2004
83	17	"Living Dangerously"	14 July 2004
84	18	"Snake Wars"	4 September 2004
85	19	"Plight of the Pelicans"	4 September 2004
86	20	"Emergency Rescue"	11 September 2004
87	21	"Spring"	11 September 2004
88	22	"Two Socks"	18 September 2004
89	23	"Floodwaters Rising"	18 September 2004
90	24	"Mary"	25 September 2004
91	25	"Las Invasores del Nido"	25 September 2004
92	26	"Action Stations"	17 October 2004
93	27	"Celebrities and Practical Jokes #2"	28 November 2004
94	28	"Final Entry"	26 December 2004
95	29	"Steve's Worst Moments"	7 September 2005
96	30	"Wild Crocs"	19 January 2006

== See also ==
- List of programs broadcast by Animal Planet
