= Ocean's Deadliest =

2007 nature documentary

Ocean's Deadliest is a 2007 nature documentary hosted by Philippe Cousteau Jr. and Steve Irwin. It was the final documentary made by Irwin before his death, which occurred during filming.

== Documentary ==
The documentary is largely filmed around Irwin's research boat, Croc One. The pair filmed and sometimes even captured several deadly sea animals, including stonefish, sea snakes, great white sharks, cone snails, blue-ringed octopuses, saltwater crocodiles and perhaps the world's deadliest venomous animal, the box jellyfish. According to Steve Irwin, one of the specimens, a Stokes' sea snake, was the largest he had seen.

The team of researchers harvested venom from the stonefish and some of the sea snakes.

== Broadcast ==
The documentary aired in the United States on 21 January 2007, on Animal Planet and Discovery Channel as a simulcast event, followed immediately by the premiere of the tribute special Crikey! What an Adventure: An Intimate Look at the Life of Steve Irwin. It aired on 22 January in Canada, in Australia on 29 January on the Nine Network, and in the United Kingdom on 15 April on ITV1.

== Impact of Irwin's death ==
Irwin's widow, Terri, stated in an interview with Access Hollywood aired on 11 January 2014 that the documentary contains no footage that was shot the day he died and that the footage of his injury and death had been destroyed. Justin Lyons, a cameraman for the documentary, has said that although footage of the incident does exist, he is against its release. Cousteau filmed the remainder of the documentary weeks after Irwin's death.

Aside from a still image of Irwin with the text "In Memory of Steve," the documentary contains no mention of his death.

== See also ==
- List of programs broadcast by Animal Planet
