= Bob Irwin =

Australian naturalist (born 1939)

- Born: Robert Eric Irwin; 8 June 1939 (age 87); Melbourne, Victoria, Australia
- Occupations: Conservationist; naturalist; zookeeper; herpetologist
- Years active: 1970–2018
- Spouses: Lyn Hakainsson (m. 1959; died 2000) Judy Harrison (m. 2004)
- Children: 3, including Steve
- Relatives: Bindi Irwin (granddaughter); Robert Irwin (grandson); Terri Irwin (daughter-in-law)

Robert Eric Irwin (born 8 June 1939), also known as Bob Irwin, is an Australian conservationist, naturalist, zookeeper, and herpetologist known for his conservation and husbandry work with apex predators and reptiles. The father of conservationist Steve Irwin, he co-founded the Queensland Reptile and Fauna Park, later renamed Australia Zoo.

== Early life ==
Robert Eric Irwin was born on 8 June 1939, in Melbourne, Victoria. His father was of Irish descent, and his mother was an English immigrant. He was a plumber from Melbourne who had also spent time building sheds and houses.

== Career ==
Irwin's career in animal conservation began in 1970, when Irwin moved his family from Essendon, located north west of Melbourne, to Queensland.

Irwin purchased 4 acres (1.6 ha) of land to construct a wildlife refuge, and constructed the Beerwah Reptile Park.

Irwin also resigned from his role as manager of Ironbark Station at Blackbutt where he lived, moving to a new 240-hectare (590-acre) property surrounded by forest and national park between Kingaroy and Murgon where he would continue his son's conservation work.

Irwin's memoir, The Last Crocodile Hunter: A Father and Son Legacy, was released on 25 October 2016.

== Personal life ==
Irwin was married to maternity nurse Lynette "Lyn" Hakainsson (1942–2000), with whom he founded the Beerwah Reptile Park. Hakainsson was among the first to care for and rehabilitate sick and injured wildlife in South East Queensland. Together, they had three children: a daughter, Joy in 1960, son Steve (1962–2006), and a second daughter, Mandy in 1966. Hakainsson was killed in a car accident on 11 February 2000, which almost drove Irwin to suicide.

In 2004, Irwin remarried to wildlife carer Judy Harrison. He announced his resignation from Australia Zoo in March 2008, and was later named Queensland's Grandfather of the Year. Irwin resides on a rural property near Kingaroy, from where he continued to campaign for wildlife and environmental conservation through his foundation, Bob Irwin Wildlife & Conservation Foundation Inc. He retired from conservation and closed his foundation in 2018.

On 12 April 2011, Bob Irwin was arrested and charged for contravening police direction as part of his civil disobedience actions against the Queensland Gas Company. He was protesting the construction of a gas pipeline. He faced court in May 2011.

On 1 July 2011, Bob Irwin announced he was considering challenging Labor incumbent Kate Jones and Liberal National Party leader Campbell Newman for the seat of Ashgrove in Brisbane. On 5 September 2011, it was reported that Irwin had become disenchanted with politics and felt he could best carry on his passion for animal conservation and fight against the coal seam gas industry from outside of the political arena.

In June 2021, Irwin's granddaughter Bindi claimed that her entire life "has been psychological abuse from him." She also stated that Bob "never said a single kind word to her personally", and had “shown no interest” in spending time with her or her family. Irwin denied these comments through a spokesperson (fellow conservationist and family friend Amanda French) not long after.
