= The Crocodile Hunter =

Australian television program

- Genre: Wildlife documentary/Travel documentary/Family
- Created by: John Stainton; Steve Irwin
- Starring: Steve Irwin; Terri Irwin; Wes Mannion
- Countries of origin: Australia; United States
- Original language: English
- No. of seasons: 5
- No. of episodes: 78 (including pilot and 13 specials) (list of episodes)

Production
- Executive producers: John Stainton; Judi Bailey; Carole Tomko Recka; Steve Irwin
- Running time: 42–45 minutes
- Production company: The Best Picture Show Company

Original release
- Network: Animal Planet
- Release: 25 October 1996 – 18 June 2004
- Network: Discovery Channel
- Release: 1 January 1997 – 4 September 2007

The Crocodile Hunter is a wildlife documentary television series hosted by Steve Irwin and his wife, Terri. The show became a popular franchise due to Irwin's unconventional approach to wildlife. It spawned a number of separate projects, including the feature film The Crocodile Hunter: Collision Course and two television spinoffs: Croc Files and The Crocodile Hunter Diaries.

First airing in 1992 on Network 10 in Australia, the series received broader attention in the United States through Animal Planet, becoming the network's highest-rated series at the time, and was in international syndication on networks worldwide. The series aired 64 episodes during five seasons, from 1997 to 2004, two years before Irwin's death, with a pilot episode in 1996 and 13 specials into 2007.

With a nearly 11-year run, the series is the second-longest-running program of any Discovery Communications network, behind MythBusters.

== Episodes ==
Series	Episodes	Originally released	
Series	Episodes	First released	Last released
Pilot		25 October 1996	
1	8	5 April 1997	24 May 1997
2	10	8 March 1998	22 November 1998
3	16	4 September 1999	24 June 2000
4	18	19 November 2000	10 August 2002
5	12	20 November 2002	18 June 2004
Specials	13	1 January 1997	4 September 2007

(note: American release dates)

== See also ==
- List of programs broadcast by Animal Planet
- Australia Zoo
- Alby Mangels
- Crocodile Safari Man
