= Wes Mannion =

Australian television personality

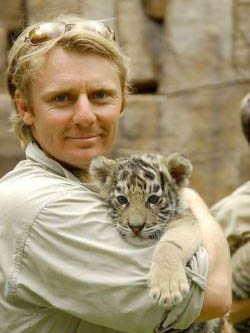
- Mannion in 2005
- Born: 1970 (age 55–56); Australia
- Occupation: former Director of Australia Zoo
- Spouse: Jodie Chapman (m. 2004–2012)
- Children: 1
- Website: www.australiazoo.com.au

Wesley Gene Mannion (born September 1970) is an Australian television personality, best known from the series The Crocodile Hunter as Steve Irwin's best friend and the former director of Australia Zoo.

== Early life ==
Mannion's interest in reptiles began in the jungles surrounding his family's home in Malaysia, where his father was stationed as a member of the Royal Australian Air Force.

In 1976, Mannion and his family returned to Australia and eventually, in 1985, settled on the Sunshine Coast in Queensland. His passion for reptiles continued throughout his childhood years and at age 14, Mannion made his first visit to the Queensland Reptile and Fauna Park, now known as Australia Zoo.

Mannion and Steve Irwin met in the mid-1980s when Mannion and his parents visited Australia Zoo. He soon became close to the Irwin family and was looked upon as a younger brother. Mannion volunteered at the zoo for a number of months and was later offered a paid keeping position. He and Irwin worked alongside each other at the zoo learning about reptile and animal husbandry and eventually moved on to capturing and relocating wild crocodiles.

== Career ==
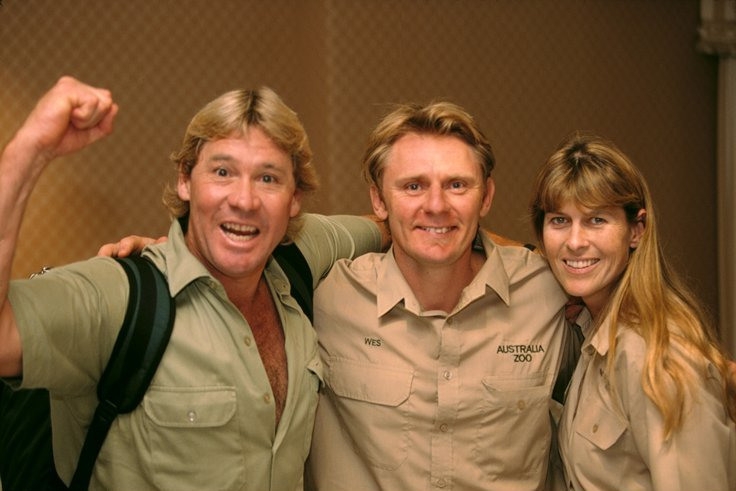
Steve Irwin, Mannion and Terri Irwin

Mannion started full-time at the Australia Zoo in 1988, working alongside Steve and gaining intimate knowledge of the care and management of wildlife. By 1992, he was promoted to head reptile keeper and curator. Realising the need to gain overseas experience, he temporarily left the zoo to gain knowledge from other zoological and veterinary facilities overseas. Upon returning to the zoo in 1995, Mannion took up the position of manager and in 2001 was promoted to director; Mannions' ex-wife Jodie Chapman is the records officer of the zoo.

During Irwin's growing success with The Crocodile Hunter show, Mannion would often star in the show as Steve's right hand and co-host, in the event that Irwin's wife Terri was unable to be there. When not co-hosting, he was usually behind the scenes to ensure the safety of the camera crew and animals.

== Incidents ==
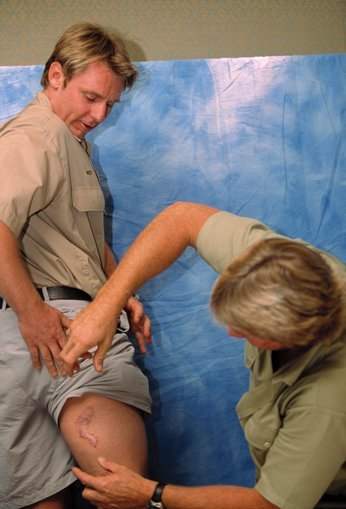
Irwin showing Mannions's scars from a crocodile attack

In 2001, Mannion was involved in a serious incident in which a captive Australian saltwater crocodile named Graham bit him on the thigh. Irwin, acting on instinct and training, subdued the crocodile with a wooden "safety stick" (a safety device located in all crocodile enclosures), allowing Mannion to escape.

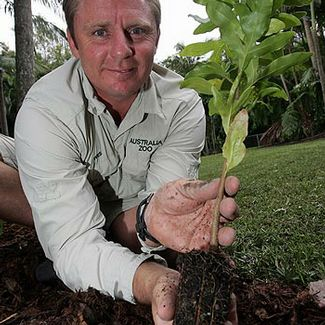
Mannion planting a tree in honour of Steve Irwin

== See also ==
- Steve Irwin
- Terri Irwin
- Australia Zoo
