= Christopher Eberts =

Canadian film and TV producer

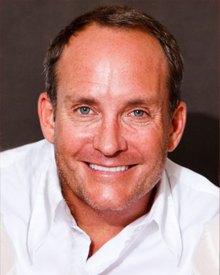
- Born: Montreal, Quebec, Canada
- Occupation(s): Film and television producer
- Years active: 2000–present

Christopher Eberts is a Canadian film and television producer. His films include Lucky Number Slevin and Lord of War.

== Early life ==
His uncle is producer Jake Eberts.

== Film production ==
In 2007 he formed production company Rifkin-Eberts with agent Arnold Rifkin.

In 2013, Eberts was indicted by a grand jury in Illinois on seven counts of wire fraud and three counts of money laundering; upon pleading guilty, he was sentenced to nearly four years in prison. Two years later, the court's decision was affirmed after Eberts appealed.

== Filmography ==
He was a producer in all films unless otherwise noted.

=== Film ===
Year	Film	Credit	Notes
1999	Woman Wanted	Executive producer	
2000	The Watcher		
2002	Half Past Dead	Executive producer	
2003	Chasing Holden		
2004	The Punisher	Executive producer	
2005	Edison	Co-executive producer	
2005	The Big White		
2005	Lord of War	Executive producer	
2006	Lucky Number Slevin		
2007	Who's Your Caddy?		
2007	Timber Falls		
2007	Already Dead		
2008	Deception		
2008	Stag Night		
2009	Night Train		Direct-to-video
2009	Blood and Bone	Executive producer	Direct-to-video
2009	Black Water Transit		
