= Mars (rapper) =

American rapper

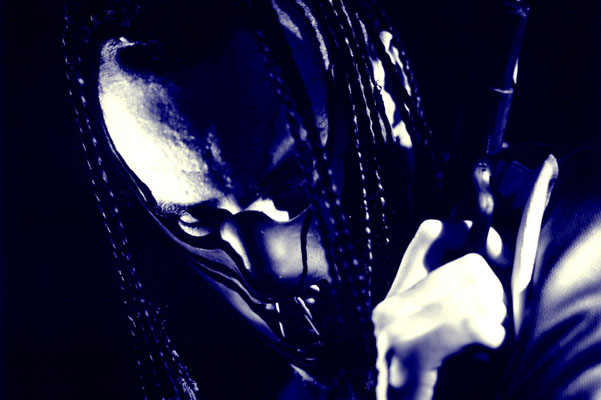
- Mars publicity photo from 2002

Background information
- Born: Mario Delgado; April 18, 1980 (age 46); Antioch, California, U.S.
- Origin: Pittsburg, California, U.S.
- Genres: Horrorcore, g-funk, gangsta rap, chicano rap
- Occupations: Rapper, producer
- Years active: 1997–present
- Labels: Mad Insanity, Empire, Force 5, RED, Sony, Black Market

Mario Delgado (born April 18, 1980), better known by his stage name Mars, is an American rapper who often performs with a Hannibal Lecter-style mask. He specializes in horrorcore and west coast music.

== Personal life ==
Mars was born in Antioch, California, and raised throughout East Contra Costa County, primarily in the city of Pittsburg. He is of Mexican-American ethnicity. He attended Liberty High School and Pittsburg Adult Education before dropping out of his regular curriculum and enrolling in various college courses, including photography, marketing, mass communication, and publication design.

Mars has three children, born in 1999, 2001 and 2007. His son Gavin has appeared in promotional videos, on stage, press, and music videos alongside his father, including the Kung Fu Vampire music video for "Love Bites” and Gorilla Voltage's "Handful of Matches" where the young actor takes lead roles.

== Career ==
Delgado began his rap career in 1997. Along with childhood friend J RZ, Who Had formed Mad Insanity Records (Previously Called Mindless Ignorance Records), through which they released their basement-style tapes to their friends locally. His stage name "Mars" was a nickname he had been called by classmates as a shortened version of his given name.

In 1998, he released his first unofficial project, S.I.D.S., on homemade cassettes and CD-Rs. Lyrical topics included rape, suicide, murder, and abortion. The tape is now considered a collector’s item by fans.

On May 9, 1999, J RZ, Mars, and several Mad Insanity Records artists and crew members were involved in a fight with Detroit rappers Eminem and Proof at The Fillmore in San Francisco during Eminem's performance on his first headlining "Slim Shady" tour. The incident was published in several notable hip-hop blogs and Bay Area newspapers, allowing Mad Insanity Records to gain a regional buzz.

In 2001, Mars signed with Black Market Records and helped found Rest In Peace Records with Rod and Anthony Singleton. That same year, Mars helped sign horrorcore pioneer Ganxsta NIP and released the Houston, Texas, artist's album The Return of the Psychopath nationwide. Mars also headed the album’s publicity and marketing as project manager for the album. When Black Market CEO Cedric Singleton observed the success Mars achieved with the project management of Ganxsta NIP, he was assigned to oversee the latest album from rap artist Big Lurch, All Bad. The Rest In Peace moniker was shortlived, due in part to Mars requesting his release from the label to push his own Mad Insanity Records.

In 2005, Mars released his debut album, Mars Attacks, with online stores selling out of copies on the first day of pre-orders, two weeks before the album’s release. Later that year, he received national attention when an alleged "fan" Jeff Weise killed nine people. Mars stated on his website that he had no link to Weise whatsoever and the supposed link of Weise being a fan of his music was called into question due to there being evidence existing of him hating rap music altogether. Due to media attention and buzz, he gained the attention of hip-hop distribution label Beyond Spaced Entertainment and re-released Mars Attacks to stores worldwide.

That same year, Mars was used as the model of a character in Hostage, a movie based on a novel by Robert Crais. The movie was adapted for the screen by Doug Richardson, with the Mars-influenced role played by Ben Foster.

On August 19, 2008, Psychopathic Records and sub-label Hatchet House released their Tunnel Runners compilation, featuring material from underground rappers and groups not signed to the label. The compilation entered the Billboard Top 25 Rap Albums chart in its first week. After the Mars track "They Watchin Me" featuring Mike Marshall became the most popular song on the project, Violent J of the group Insane Clown Posse invited Mars to perform on Psychopathic Records’ "Shock Therapy Tour" alongside Anybody Killa, Blaze Ya Dead Homie, Boondox, Axe Murder Boyz, and J Reno. After Boondox experienced medical issues from a prior surgery, Mars replaced the artist on Insane Clown Posse's 2008 “Hallowicked Clown Tour.”

In 2009, soon after the release of his album School House Glock: Extra Credit, a project that blatantly poked fun at his previous controversy, Delgado received international attention once again when Mars fan Richard Sam McCroskey killed four people. McCroskey's MySpace page listed Mars as his favorite rapper, and Mars told law enforcement he had seen and signed autographs for McCroskey at various events before the murders. Following these events, Delgado was interviewed by several TV news outlets around the United States, including CBS News, Fox News, ABC News, and CNN.

Mars released The Zodiac Mixtape (Limited Edition) LP through Mad Insanity on March 20, 2012. On June 17, 2014, Empire Distribution released his entire discography digitally, including new singles “Hold On,” “Hurt ‘Em,” and “Overnight Change.”

In October 2015, Mars was asked to interview his favorite horror figures for a takeover of CBS Radio's website Man Cave Daily. After landing interviews and photoshoots alongside actress Mena Suvari, Insane Clown Posse, and Sid Haig, he was asked to work full-time as a celebrity blogger.

In 2016, after a brief hiatus, Mars embarked on his "Road To Redemption" tour. He went on to win the Best Male Hip-Hop trophy at the 9Quota Awards. Mars made several appearances on artists’ albums and compilations, including the song "All I Know," which appeared on 1 World Magazine and Knocksmith Magazine's No H compilation. In January 2017, the project won Hip-Hop Album of the Year at the 9Quota Awards. Mars took home the Best Overall Hip-Hop and Best Overall Artist awards. The same day, Mars signed a deal with Milwaukee, Wisconsin-based Force 5 Records. He moved to the Midwest to focus on recording music and helping to establish the new label. He released the single “Creatures of the Night,” featuring Tech N9ne and Twiztid, as his first physical record with Force 5. On July 28, 2017, he released his album Glockcoma. Mars also appeared on New York hardcore musician Danny Diablo's album The Crackson Heights Project, released to an overseas market through Eternal Sound Records, the international distributor for Force 5 Records. He released a series of songs and appearances on Force 5 Records’ Ruckus Mixtape, including the song "Freak Treat," which was given away for free both digitally and physically.

In 2018, Mars released his collaborative album Drunk On The Hwy with Young Swizz through Force 5 Records. On January 20th he won Best Hip-Hop Single Of The Year at the 9Quota Awards for “Creatures Of The Night”. The following year he released The Hangover with Young Swizz and won album of the year at the 2019 9Quota Awards.

That year Swizz and Mars released their follow “The Hangover” EP. The following month he released the single “In Memory” sparking rumors on its release date that the artist had died. In June 2019 Mad Insanity Records along with EMPIRE and Force 5 Records released the first single off of his album Locked Up A Broad called “Throw It All Away" immediately earning himself radio play in major markets erupting in a bidding with major labels in hopes to sign the artist. After the albums release, Mars went on to strictly release music from his own label with his existing EMPIRE distribution in place including the single "Medication" earning himself single of the year at the "Grrd Awards".

== Discography ==
Studio albums

- S.I.D.S. (Sudden Infant Death Syndrome) (1998)
- Glockcoma (LP) (2017)
- Drunk on the Hwy (LP) (2018) (with Young Swizz)
- Locked Up a Broad (LP) (2019)
- Devils & Demons (LP) (2020) (with Danny Diablo)
- Bee Sides Vol 1 (LP) (2020)
- Bee Sides Vol 2 (LP) (2020)
- Death (LP) (2022)

EPs

- Mars Attacks (EP) (2006)
- School House Glock (EP) (2008)
- The Hangover (EP) (2019) (with Young Swizz)
- Murder (EP) (2019)
- Killing Spree (EP) (2020) (with Jason Porter)

Mixtapes

- The Zodiac Mixtape Limited Edition (LP) (2012)

Compilations

- Mars Presents: Welcome To The Underworld Vol. 1 (LP) (2021)

Singles

- "Mistreat" (1998)
- "Rise To Power" (2000) (with Mad Insanity)
- "Slaughterhouse feat Halfbreed" (2001) (with Mad Insanity)
- "I Can't Hate" (2005)
- "Stinky the Rapist" (2009) (with Mad Insanity)
- "Hurt 'Em " (2012)
- "A Different Tune" (2013)
- "Overnight Change" (2013)
- "Hold On" (2014)
- DLK Enterprise Presents: Mars, V-town, Telly Mac - "I'm Taken Yo Life" (2014)
- "Gotta Problem" (2017)
- "Creatures Of The Night feat Tech N9ne & Twiztid" (2017)
- "Caught A Body feat V-Town" (2018)
- "Bad Temper" (2019)
- "In Memory" (2019)
- "Throw It All Away" (2019)
- "Rainy Day" (2019)
- "Medication" (2019)
- "Always Be" (2019)
- "It Gets Deep" (2019)
- "Put Em In A Box" (2019)
- "Leave Me Alone feat Skribbal, The DRP, Vinnie Paz, & G-Mo Skee" (2020) (with Danny Diablo)
- "Walking In My Sleep" (2020)
- "Cry Baby" (2020)
- "Say What You Say" (2020)
- "Aint Worried About Shit" (2020)
- "Sick Man" (2020)
- "Toxic" (2020)
- "Prey 4 You" (2020)
- "The Wrath Of The Siccness feat D-Dubb" (2020) (with Lil Sicx)
- "About You" (2021)
- "Mack The Knife" (2021)
- "Locked Down" (2021)
- "Forsaken" (2021)
- "Nobody Knows" (2021)
