= Cheyenne Enterprises =

American TV and film production company

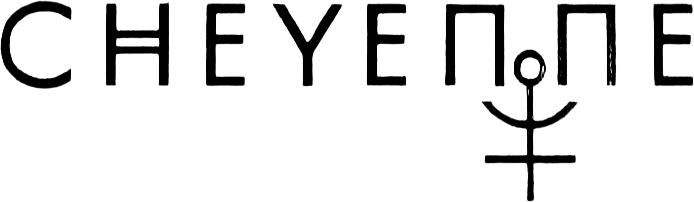
- Industry: Motion pictures, Entertainment
- Founded: 1999
- Headquarters: Santa Monica, California, United States
- Key people: Bruce Willis (CEO), Arnold Rifkin
- Products: Film; TV films

Cheyenne Enterprises is an American television and film production company, based in Santa Monica, California. Founded in 1999, it is privately owned by Bruce Willis and Arnold Rifkin. When the company launched, the company signed a first look deal with Revolution Studios.

For the most part, the company has produced or co-produced projects that star Bruce Willis.

== Films ==
- Hangman (2017)
- Sacrifice (2016)
- Dum Maaro Dum (2011)
- Deception (2008)
- Who's Your Caddy? (2007)
- Live Free or Die Hard (2007)
- Just My Luck (2006)
- 16 Blocks (2006)
- Black Water Transit (2006)
- Scarlett (TV film) (2006)
- Serial (2006)
- Hostage (2005)
- The Whole Ten Yards (2004)
- The Law and Mr. Lee (TV film) (2003)
- Tears of the Sun (2003)
- True West (TV film) (2002)
- The Crocodile Hunter: Collision Course (2002)
- Hart's War (2002)
- Bandits (2001)

== Television series ==
- Full Throttle Saloon (2009)
- Touching Evil (2004)
- Gary the Rat (2003)
