= Kyle Pratt =

Kyle Pratt may refer to:

- Kyle Pratt, a character in Flightplan
- Kyle Pratt, a player on the 2008 Florida Gators football team
