= Slangman's World =

- Genre: Children's television series Educational
- Created by: David Burke; Bill Ceresia; Kenny Gage; Timothy Harrington
- Written by: David Burke; Bill Ceresia; Kenny Gage; Timothy Harrington; Jenn Reese; Andrew Pagana
- Directed by: Andrew Pagana
- Voices of: David Burke
- Composer: David Burke
- Country of origin: United States
- Original language: English (and other languages only in episodes)
- No. of seasons: 2
- No. of episodes: 11

Production
- Producers: David Burke; Bill Ceresia; Kenny Gage; Timothy Harrington; Arnold Rifkin
- Running time: 22–24 minutes
- Production companies: Cosmic Toast Studios; ThkMedia Animation (Hey Wordy!)

Original release
- Network: American Forces Network; Georgia Public Broadcasting
- Release: March 6, 2007 – November 2008

Slangman's World is an American live-action/animation children's musical program that introduces preschoolers ages 2–6 to the world of foreign languages and cultures in an environment of music, puppetry, animation, and magic.

== Plot ==
Slangman, the show's host, played by David Burke, a high-energy, unpredictable wizard and wordsmith, invites a studio audience of children into his enchanted multicultural world where his animated costars Wordy, Gizma, Blue Cat, Crash, and Cloudy help children broaden their language skills and their view of the world.

== Release ==
Slangman's World debuted its first season of programming for American Forces Network (AFN), one of the network's first original children's programs in its 66-year history. The show aired in 174 countries across AFN where it helped military families integrate into their foreign language environments. Its second season appeared on Georgia Public Broadcasting, the third-largest Public Broadcasting Service (PBS) affiliate in America.

== Episodes ==
Title	Writer(s)	Airdate	Ep. #
"Maison"	David Burke, Timothy Michael Harrington, Andrew Pagana	2009-01-05	1
Wordy and Slangman jump into the fishbowl to join the School of Fish for their French lesson. Unfortunately, Miss Crabby is boring the class to sleep with her lecture. Slangman to the rescue! With a magical gesture, Slangman enters the chalkboard and sings "Maison." By the time he's done, Wordy and the fish have learned six new words in French!
"Pronto"	David Burke, Andrew Pagana	2009-01-07	2
Wordy flies into Slangman's Cross-Cultural Kitchen, upset that he overslept and missed breakfast. That's no problem for Slangman, Chef Stacoupé, Mel Tingpot, and the rest of the kitchen characters. They can make anything, and they can make it "Pronto!"
"Kaputt"	David Burke, Jenn Reese, Andrew Pagana	2009-01-12	3
Slangman finds Wordy looking for a toy, and breaking all his other toys in the process. With the help of a magic storybook and the song "Kaputt," Slangman teaches Wordy the importance of taking care of his toys... and a few new words in German.
"Umnia"	David Burke, Jenn Reese	2009-01-15	4
When Slangman tucks Wordy into bed for the night, he says goodnight in Arabic. Wordy asks for a bedtime story, and Slangman continues the Arabic theme. He sings "Umniah," the story of a young boy in Egypt who finds a magic lamp and makes three wishes... But it's the genie's wish that ultimately brings the boy happiness.
"Chinese New Year"	David Burke, Jenn Reese	2009-01-19	5
On the eve of the Chinese New Year, Wordy finds Slangman and the chopsticks Mee and Yu sweeping out the house to prepare for the new year. Slangman sings "Chinese New Year" about the twelve animals of the Chinese zodiac. By the end of the song, day has turned into night, and fireworks light the sky in celebration of the new year.
"Slangman's Farm"	David Burke, Jenn Reese, Andrew Pagana	2009-01-22	6
While Slangman and Wordy are taking a morning stroll through Slangman's Farm, they encounter Slangrooster, who is preparing for the morning crow. Slangman and the farm's international roosters sing "On Slangman's Farm," and show Wordy that animals speak different languages, just like people!
"Felice"	David Burke, Jenn Reese	2009-01-26	7
When Slangman is hanging pictures, Wordy asks him why. Slangman replies that the pictures represent things that make him happy. A photograph of Slangman in Italy comes to life and informs them that "happy" is "felice" in Italian. Slangman sends Wordy to an imaginary Venice made of ice cream and chocolate, where they sing about items that make Slangman "Felice."
"Bonjour"	David Burke, Jenn Reese	2009-01-29	8
Slangman calls his cousin Pierre to help Wordy with his French lesson. Wordy is magically transported to France, where Pierre and Wordy sing "Bonjour" while wandering through the streets of Paris.
"Seasons"	David Burke, Jenn Reese	2009-02-02	9
In order to sing a song about the seasons, Slangman and Wordy load up the piano in the Music Room with all sorts of seasonal items such as trees, lemonade, sunshine, snow, and hot apple cider. Then Slangman magically summons a friend from Japan to help them sing, "Seasons."
"The Counting Song"	David Burke, Jenn Reese	2009-02-05	10
When Wordy goes looking for Slangman, he finds his friend shrunk down and inside a broken Korean clock! Slangman asks Wordy to help him fix the 12 different gears, and together they sing "The Counting Song"!

== 90-Second Episodes and Music Videos ==
- EP1: Guten Tag - German
- EP2: Yi Er San - Chinese
- EP3: Otlichno - Russian
- EP4: Por Favor - Spanish
- EP5: Chocho - Japanese
- EP6: Sitara - Hindi
- EP7: Cane - Italian
- EP8: Quttah - Arabic
- EP9: Hae - Korean
- EP10: Merci - French

== Hey Wordy! ==
Hey Wordy! is a 2017 American children's live-action animated musical spin-off of Slangman's World which was the 12-minute pilot episode to celebrate Cloudy's birthday with the words "Pastel" and "Feliz Cumpleaños" in Spanish. This "Hey Wordy!" pilot was on Vimeo and it produced by ThkMedia Animation for Georgia Public Broadcasting and American Forces Network.
