= Cosmic Toast Studios =

American animation studio

- Type: Subsidiary
- Industry: Animation
- Founded: 2007; 19 years ago
- Founder: David Burke; Kenny Gage; Andrew Pagana
- Defunct: May 17, 2016; 10 years ago
- Headquarters: Sherman Oaks, California U.S
- Key people: Alan Anderson (CEO)
- Parent: Toast & Jam Holdings (2013–2015); Imbee, Inc. (2015–2016)
- Website: cosmictoaststudios.com

Cosmic Toast Studios was an American animation studio based in Sherman Oaks, California. Founded in 2007 by David Burke, Kenny Gage, and Andrew Pagana.

In 2016, the company was shut down after CEO Alan Anderson was indicated over fraud charges.

== Filmography ==
Show	Creator(s)	Year(s)	Network	Co-production(s)	Notes
Slangman's World	David Burke; Bill Ceresia; Kenny Cage; Timothy Harrington	2007–2008	American Forces Network		
Your Favorite Martian: The Series	Ray William Johnson	2011–2012	Animonster	Maker Studios	
Powerhouse	Tim Chantarangsu; Pedro Flores; Rick Carter	2011–2012	Animonster	Maker Studios	
Dino Yacht Club	Michael Gallagher; Steve Greene	2011–2013	Animonster	Maker Studios	
This One N' That One	Jane Seymour; James Keach	2012	YouTube		
Broken Quest	Dodger Leigh	2013	Polaris	Maker Studios	
Shaybeard	Shay Carl	2013	Cartoonium	Maker Studios	
Tvoovies	Jeff Newman	2013–2015	Union Pool		
Pugatory	Marzia Bisognin	2015	YouTube	Maker Studios	Animation
Detention 7	Rich Cando	2015–2016	SpindoTV		The Studio Final Productions
