= Gary the Rat =

2003 American animated television series

- Genre: Animated sitcom
- Created by: Mark Cullen; Robb Cullen
- Starring: Kelsey Grammer; Billy Gardell; Spencer Garrett; Rick Gomez; Robb Cullen
- Composers: Mark Mothersbaugh; Josh Mancell
- Country of origin: United States
- No. of seasons: 2
- No. of episodes: 26

Production
- Executive producers: Mark Cullen; Robb Cullen; Kelsey Grammer; Arnold Rifkin
- Running time: 20–22 minutes
- Production companies: Grammnet Productions; Cheyenne Enterprises; The New TNN Originals (2003) (season 1); Spike TV (2003) (season 1)

Original release
- Network: Spike TV (Note: Episodes 1-7 aired during the TNN era)
- Release: June 26 – December 11, 2003

Gary the Rat is an American adult animated sitcom created by the Cullen Brothers for Spike TV (previously known as TNN) and animated by Spike Animation Studios. It was produced by Grammnet Productions and Cheyenne Enterprises and distributed by Viacom.

It began as web episodes in flash animation on the internet in 2000, created by the defunct eStudio (later re-structured studio BLITZ) for Mediatrip.com. It consisted of 13 short episodes programmed in Adobe Flash which also included a game to occupy the viewer while the episode loaded in the background.

The network TV series aired on Spike in 2003, lasting for two seasons.

== Premise ==
Gary "The Rat" Andrews is a self-centered, misanthropic defense attorney who awakens one morning to find that he has somehow transformed into a giant bipedal rat. Gary struggles to deal with his transformation and hold on to his status as a highly-paid and mercenary lawyer. Until Gary figures out why he's like this he has decided to try and function the best he can in a "human" world.

Outraged at Gary's new appearance, Truman, a tenant in Gary's expensive apartment building, has hired pest exterminator Johnny Bugz to get rid of Gary for good.

Grammer said of the character, "Gary the Rat has been compromising every scruple to the point that he compromises his humanity."

== Voice actors ==
- Kelsey Grammer as Gary "The Rat" Andrews, a successful and ruthless lawyer at Harrison, Camille, Beckett and Weiss who has turned into a 6-foot rat. According to the episode This Is Not a Pipe, Gary likes opera.
- Billy Gardell as Jack Harrison, Gary's boss and named partner at Harrison, Camille, Beckett and Weiss.
- Betty White as Gary's Mother, unseen and only appears as a voice on the telephone.
- Robb Cullen as Johnny Bugz, a pest exterminator with a particular dislike of rats and pet cat called Boots.
- Brooke Shields as Cassandra Harrison, Mr. Harrison's wife. She only appeared in the episode Future Ex-Wife.
- Camille Grammer as Betty, Mr. Harrison's Secretary
- Spencer Garrett as Truman Pinksdale, President of the Montana Resident's Committee.
- John Mahoney as Steele, resident at the Montana apartment building.
- David Hyde Pierce as Addison, resident at the Montana apartment building.
- Rick Gomez as Bud, a cheese delivery boy who is not very bright and mistakes Gary for being a dog.
- Hynden Walch as Little Girl, witness in the Southern Tobacco Company case.
- Ted Danson as Terry McMillan, con artist and suck up, joins the firm as their newest mergers and acquisitions lawyer.
- Mary Stuart Masterson as Caroline Swanson, Gary's ex-girlfriend and an opposing lawyer.
- Wayne Knight as Gary's rival, J. P. Wordley.
- Joe Pantoliano as Anthony 'the Heel' Stilletto
- John Corbett as Frank Spillogotoriettio, lawyer with Boywe, Cheatem and Howe. He only appeared in the episode This Is Not a Pipe.
- Michael Keaton as Jerry Andrews, Gary's cousin and con artist, wanted for forgery, polygamy and other offenses.
- Vance DeGeneres as Additional Voices
- Susan Savage as April
- Jonathan David Cook
- Seymour Cassel
- Marnie Alexenburg
- Robert Goulet as Himself
- Kristin Bauer van Straten
- Rob Paulsen as Police Officer
- Kevin Michael Richardson
- Michael Panes

== Media ==
=== List of web episodes ===
Episodes were approximately 3 minutes long, programmed in Adobe Flash which also included a game to occupy the viewer while the episode loaded in the background.

| No. | Title |
|---|---|
| 1 | "Manrattan Part 1" |
It's been two weeks since Gary became a rat, and Truman advises him that a tenant's meeting decided that he should leave the building, but he refuses to leave. Truman hires Johnny the pest exterminator to get rid of Gary.
| 2 | "Manrattan Part 2" |
Johnny sets fire to a cheese store as a trap for Gary.
| 3 | "Manrattan Part 3" |
Gary appears in court defending Southern Tobacco, but while badgering the plaintiff in the witness stand, Johnny throws his spear, missing Gary and killing the plaintiff.
| 4 | "Cats Part 1" |
After entertaining representatives from Nikata Industries Tom Wu's Karaoke Palace Gary agrees to take them to see the musical "Cats".
| 5 | "Cats Part 2" |
Gary loses his cool during the performance of "Cats" causing him and the Japanese businessmen to be arrested. After being bailed out, they are about to sign the contract with Gary's firm when Johnny kills them with a machine gun. Gary then forges their signatures on the document.
| 6 | "King of Rats Part 1" |
After a day at work where Gary has some very smelly cheese delivered, Johnny follows Gary to the subway platform and pushes him onto the tracks into the path of an oncoming train.
| 7 | "King of Rats Part 2" |
Gary escapes an oncoming train by jumping through a hole in the tunnel and is greeted by three rats who declare him their king. They lead Gary out of the tunnels, but after they emerge from a manhole, Johnny runs over and kills the three rats, leaving Gary nonplussed.
| 8 | "Rat Hero Part 1" |
Johnny sets fire to a cheese store as a trap for Gary.
| 9 | "Rat Hero Part 2" |
Gary ruses into the burning store to rescue the cheese, but accidentally saves a baby stranded inside, becoming a local hero.
| 10 | "The Hamptons Part 1" |
Gary travels to the Hamptons but finds that rats now seem to be excluded everywhere and accepts that he is now an animal, and prepares to take his life.
| 11 | "The Hamptons Part 2" |
Standing on the shoreline at night, Gary is about to swallow rat poison when a shapely woman approaches him in the darkness. However when she approaches he is repulsed by her disfigured face. As Gary walks off, Johnny fires a harpoon from his boat offshore, killing the woman.
| 12 | "The Blind Date Part 1" |
Harrison directs Gary goes on a blind date with his wife's cousin since his "change." While Gary is leaving his tailor's shop, Johnny throws a steel mace, just missing Gary's head.
| 13 | "The Blind Date Part 2" |
Gary has dinner with his overweight and unattractive blind date and she propositions him, meanwhile Johnny fires a corkscrew at Gary but misses. The corkscrew hits a gas main causing an explosion, killing Gary's date.

=== List of network episodes ===
Each episode begins with Gary having a surrealistic nightmare in which he is killed. During each episode Gary receives telephone calls from his mother in which he heartlessly dismisses her.

| No. | Title | Original release date |
|---|---|---|
| 1 | "Manratten" | June 26, 2003 |
Gary Andrews, a successful Wall Street attorney, wakes up one morning to discover that he has turned into a 6 ft. rat. He must now learn to live his life as a giant rat in a modern world. Truman hires Johnny Bugz the pest exterminator to get rid of Gary. Meanwhile Gary seeks answers to his predicament and the meaning of life, without success. However he is surprised when he keeps his position because some clients like the idea of a giant rat representing them and Mr. Harrison assigns him to the Southern Tobacco Company account.
| 2 | "Inherit the Cheese" | July 3, 2003 |
Gary is given the biggest case of his career defending the Southern Tobacco Company against the State of New York. Meanwhile Truman take thing into his own hands and unsuccessfully tries to poison Gary with a cheese delivery. Johnny Bugz tries to spear Gary in court, but misses and kills one of the plaintiffs. Gary wins the case by arguing that the tobacco executives shouldn't be persecuted just because they are different.
| 3 | "Spring of Love" | July 10, 2003 |
Harrison invites Gary to his home for a Spring Ball to woo new clients, and Gary must bring a date. Gary's old girlfriends aren't interested, so after some failed attempts to find a woman, he tries a dating agency without success. He finally finds the right woman at a Jewish singles night. However she dumps him at the ball when she discovers that he is not Jewish. Meanwhile, Bugz is at the ball dressed as a cupid, but when he shoots his arrow at Gary, he misses and kills his date. In desperation Gary calls Marjorie Saunders from the dating agency who is lonely and suicidal, and she agrees to attend. She is a great success and she and Gary appear to be attracted to each other. However, Gary accidentally knocks her off the balcony with his tail and she falls to her death.
| 4 | "Rat Day Afternoon" | July 17, 2003 |
Gary is forced to mentor Mr. Harrison's son, Scott, a gay, tattooed and pierced slacker who works in the company mail room. On a trip to the bank with Gary, Scott decides to hold it up and Gary is forced to negotiate with the police. Eventually Scott reconciles with his father and is arrested. Parody of the movie "Dog Day Afternoon".
| 5 | "Mergers and Acquisitions" | July 24, 2003 |
Terry McMillan, a con artist and suck up, joins the firm as their newest mergers and acquisitions lawyer. He successfully gets Gary fired, but Gary exacts his revenge by taking advantage of Terry's past as a sexual deviant. He sets Terry up and he sexually assaults Betty in the photocopier room. Terry gets fired, but as a last effort to redeem himself, he grabs a cake from Bugz which is meant for Gary. Before Terry can give it Harrison, the explosive candle explodes, killing him.
| 6 | "Old Flame" | July 31, 2003 |
Gary's ex-girlfriend, Caroline Swanson, returns as the opposing counsel on a multi-million dollar lawsuit. She tries to seduce Gary in order to get him to settle, but when Gary goes to her apartment, he is told what she's planning by a rat outside. Angry at her deceiving him before he can beguile her, Gary goes on to win the case.
| 7 | "The Reunion" | August 7, 2003 |
Gary is forced to attend his high school reunion organized by his arch rival J. P. Wordley because his legal firm has been poaching Harrison's clients. Bugz tries to blackmail Truman into paying him more money, but Truman kidnaps Bugz's cat Boots and promises to keep it hostage until Bugz kills Gary. Bugz attends the ball as a DJ and electrifies the reunion King's crown. Gary meets Wordley who gloats over his successes at Gary's expense. However after Bugz announces Gary and Wordley's wife Amanda as King and Queen of the reunion, Wordley grabs the crown from Gary and electrocutes himself. Harrison is so thrilled with Wordley's death and recovering his clients that he offers Gary a position as Senior Partner.
| 8 | "Sleeps with the Fishes" | August 14, 2003 |
Mr. Harrison coerces Gary to represent Anthony "the Heel" Stilletto, the head of one of the major NY crime families. After winning the first case, Stilletto takes a liking to Gary and forces him to marry Angel, the hideously ugly fish-like daughter of his godfather. Fearing death, Gary draws up his will, making Bud his beneficiary. However, the godfather is offended by her betrothal to a rat, and the entire crime family is killed in a shoot-out at the wedding ceremony, including Angel who is killed by a falling statue of Poseidon, the Greek God of the Sea. When Gary returns home, he finds that Bud has already moved into his apartment.
| 9 | "Strange Bedfellows" | September 28, 2003 |
Montana residents, Mr. Addison and Mr. Steele, ask Gary to run against Truman Pinksdale in the presidential election for their building association. They argue that Truman is letting minorities into the apartment building. However it's a ploy by Truman to impeach and evict Gary once he is president. Gary convinces Mr. Spillers, the swing voter not to impeach him, so he becomes president. Meanwhile, Bugz plans to shoot Gary at the resident's meeting, but accidentally shoots Addison and Steele. President Gary then assigns Truman to garbage duty.
| 10 | "This Is Not a Pipe" | October 5, 2003 |
During a court case, Gary's opposing lawyer, Frank Spillogotoriettio, is fired for having leprosy. Meanwhile, Bugz kidnaps Gary's mother in a plot to trap and kill Gary. Frank asks Gary to take his unfair dismissal case against his former employers, so Gary must balance his inherent lack of compassion for the weak with the desire to win his client's case. Gary also is conflicted over whether he cares what happens to his mother, but after not hearing from her before his appearance in court, he rushes to rescue her, leaving the incompetent Harrison to continue with the case. After escaping from Bugz with his mother, Gary returns to court and wins the case, just before Frank's body falls apart. A parody of the movie "Philadelphia".
| 11 | "Catch Me If You Can" | November 25, 2003 |
Gary's long-lost cousin, Jerry Andrews, pays him a visit, pursued by two bumbling FBI agents. Jerry is the ultimate con artist, wanted for forgery, polygamy and other offences. When Gary goes to work, Jerry cleans out Gary's apartment and withdraws his savings dressed in a giant rat costume. However Bugz sees Jerry in the costume, and believing it to be Gary, runs him over multiple times with his van. Later, a building worker digs up a videotape of the 'Gary the Rat Lost Episodes' and plays the episode 'King of Rats'. In that episode Bugz pushes him onto the tracks in the path of an oncoming train. Gary escapes and is greeted by three rats who declare him their king. They lead Gary out of the tunnels, but after they emerge Bugz runs over and kills the three rats.
| 12 | "Future Ex-Wife" | December 2, 2003 |
Cassandra, Harrison's beautiful wife, decides to leave him and asks Gary to represent her in court. Harrison represents himself, and manages to convince her to stay with him, much to Gary's disappointment. Later, a building worker digs up a videotape of the "Gary the Rat Lost Episodes" and plays the episode "The Hamptons". Gary travels to the Hamptons but depressed at rejection, he prepares to take his life. Standing on the shoreline at night, Gary is about to swallow rat poison when a shapely woman approaches him in the darkness. However he is repulsed when he sees her disfigured face. As Gary walks off, Johnny fires a harpoon from his boat, killing the woman.
| 13 | "A Good Execution" | December 11, 2003 |
Johnny Bugz botches another murder attempt on Gary, killing innocent people instead. Oblivious to the fact that he was the target, Gary reluctantly agrees to take Johnny's case pro bono to defend him on murder charges. Truman smuggles a gun into prison for Bugz hidden inside a cake. When in court, Bugz throws the cake at Gary and misses, the gun accidentally shooting Harrison. Truman then smuggles a bible containing a bomb which Bugz takes with him to the electric chair. The guilt-ridden Gary arrives with a stay of execution, but the bomb explodes killing everyone except Bugz's cat who discovered Gary's human hand growling angry at it.

== Critical reception ==
Kevin McDonough of United Media gave the show a negative review, praising the voice actors but calling the show itself "virtually laugh-free." Phil Gallo of Daily Variety thought that the first episode was "too serious" and that Grammer's character was derivative of Frasier Crane. Giving it one star out of four, Dean Johnson of The Boston Herald criticized the first episode as unfunny, and questioned whether the show would fit Spike's demographic.

A more favorable review came from Rob Owen of the Pittsburgh Post-Gazette, who thought that Grammer was "well-cast" and that it was the "least crude" of the three cartoons airing on Spike at the time (Ren & Stimpy "Adult Party Cartoon" and Stripperella). Matthew Williams of Toon Zone gave a mixed review, saying that some elements of episodes were drawn out for too long, but that Grammer "saves the show from mediocrity" and that he considered some of the jokes funny.

== Release ==
The complete series has not been released on DVD or Blu-ray. However, all episodes are available on iTunes and Amazon Prime Video.
