= Peter A. Dowling =

British screenwriter

Peter Anthony Dowling is a British screenwriter and film director. He was born in Salford, England, in 1969 and started his career in children's animation in both the UK and Germany, working on cartoons such as The Raggy Dolls, Benjamin Bluemchen and Renada.

After winning the Fulbright TEB Clarke Fellowship in Screenwriting 1996/7, judged by William Goldman and paid for by John Cleese, Dowling moved to the United States, briefly attending the University of Southern California, and then sold a spec screenplay to Arnold Kopelson (Platoon, Se7en) and 20th Century Fox.

His first produced movie was Flightplan starring Jodie Foster which was commercially successful in the U.S. and grossed over $223,000,000 worldwide.

Starting in 2007 he began to direct, and his first film was Stag Night.

== Filmography ==
=== Television ===
- Waldo’s Way (1996)
- Renada (1998)
- Transformers: Rescue Bots Academy (2019–2020)
- Red Eye (2024)

=== Films ===
- Flightplan (2005) - Writer
- Stag Night (2007) - Writer/Director
- Reasonable Doubt (2014) - Writer
- Sacrifice (2016) - Writer/Director
- Black and Blue (2019) - Writer
