= Tears of the Sun =

2003 film by Antoine Fuqua

- Theatrical release poster
- Directed by: Antoine Fuqua
- Written by: Alex Lasker; Patrick Cirillo
- Produced by: Ian Bryce; Mike Lobell; Arnold Rifkin
- Starring: Bruce Willis; Monica Bellucci; Cole Hauser; Tom Skerritt
- Cinematography: Mauro Fiore
- Edited by: Conrad Buff
- Music by: Hans Zimmer
- Production companies: Columbia Pictures; Revolution Studios; Cheyenne Enterprises
- Distributed by: Sony Pictures Releasing
- Release date: March 7, 2003
- Running time: 121 minutes
- Country: United States
- Language: English
- Budget: $100.5 million
- Box office: $86.5 million

Tears of the Sun is a 2003 American action thriller film directed by Antoine Fuqua. It depicts a fictitious U.S. Navy SEAL team rescue mission amidst the 21st-century version of the Nigerian Civil War. Lieutenant A.K. Waters (Bruce Willis) commands the team sent to rescue U.S. citizen Dr. Lena Fiore Kendricks (Monica Bellucci) before the approaching rebels reach her jungle hospital.

Willis produced Tears of the Sun through Cheyenne Enterprises, his production company.

== Plot ==
A coup d'état led by exiled General Mustafa Yakubu overthrows the President of Nigeria, Samuel Azuka, sending Nigeria into chaos and causing an ethnic conflict between Yakubu's tribe, the Fulani Muslims, and Azuka's Christian Igbo. Samuel and his family are assassinated, and foreigners are evacuated from the country.

Aboard the Harry S. Truman, a SEAL team, led by A. K. Waters, is tasked by Captain Bill Rhodes to extract Dr. Lena Fiore Kendricks from a rural Christian mission. She is a U.S. citizen by marriage to the late Dr. John Kendricks, who was killed by rebels in Sierra Leone. The team reaches Kendricks, who refuses to leave without her patients. Waters calls Rhodes for options; after a conversation, he accedes to Kendricks' wishes and agrees to take those refugees who can walk. However Lena's fellow doctors, the nuns and priest, refuse to leave.

Irritated and behind schedule, the team and the refugees leave the hospital mission at daybreak. While resting for the night, a rebel company passes by, and Waters is forced to knife one of them to keep from being discovered. Kendricks begs Waters to turn back towards the mission, but he is determined to carry out his orders, so they continue to the extraction point. The rebels storm the mission, murdering the helpless patients and killing the priest and nuns.

When the team arrives at the extraction point, Waters' initial plan becomes clear: the SEALs turn away the refugees from the waiting helicopter. Waters forces Kendricks into the helicopter against her will, leaving the refugees stranded. En route back to the Harry Truman, they fly over the original mission compound, now in flames. A remorseful Waters orders the pilot to return to the refugees. He loads as many as he can into the helicopter and decides to escort the remaining ones to the Cameroon border.

En route, the SEALs discover the rebels are tracking them. They come across an Igbo village being raided, so impulsively engage and kill the soldiers inside, but are shaken by the atrocities they have seen committed against the villagers. When the pursuing rebels close in within a single night to their position, the SEALs conclude that a refugee is transmitting their location. One of the recently arrived ones, Gideon, is exposed as an informant and tries to run but is shot dead. A transmitter is found on his corpse.

Suspicious, the SEAL's search for his co-conspirators reveals the presence of Arthur Azuka, the surviving son of Samuel Azuka. The rebels are hunting them as Samuel was not only the president of the country but also the tribal king of the Ibo. As the only surviving member of this royal bloodline, Arthur is the only person with a legitimate claim to the Ibo nation.

The SEALs decide to continue escorting the refugees to Cameroon. A firefight ensues when the rebels catch up with them, and the SEALs decide to stay behind as rearguard to buy the refugees enough time to reach the border. Slo, Lake, Flea, and Silk die in the firefight, and Zee calls in for air support. Waters, Red, Doc, and Zee are wounded but able to direct an airstrike. Air support wipes out the rebels as Rhodes arrives at the border with reinforcements. He orders the gate opened, letting in the SEALs and refugees.

Rhodes promises Waters that he will recover the bodies of Waters' fallen men. Kendricks bids farewells to her Nigerian friends and flies away in a helicopter while comforting Waters, watching as Arthur is surrounded by his people proclaiming their freedom.

== Cast ==
- Bruce Willis as Lieutenant Alec Kevin "A.K." Waters, US Navy - Team Leader Commander
- Monica Bellucci as Dr. Lena Fiore Kendricks - Doctor at the International Humanitarian Aid
- Cole Hauser as James "Red" Atkins, US Navy - Heavy Gunner and Explosives Specialist
- Eamonn Walker as Ellis "Zee" Pettigrew, US Navy - Radioman and Grenadier
- Nick Chinlund as Michael "Slo" Slowenski, US Navy - SAW Gunner and Reconnaissance GPS Enemy Tech
- Fionnula Flanagan as Sister Grace McIntyre
- Malick Bowens as Colonel Idris Sadick
- Tom Skerritt as Captain Bill Rhodes, US Navy - Commanding Officer
- Johnny Messner as Johnny Kelly "JKL" Lake, US Navy - Recon and Pointman
- Paul Francis as Danny "Doc" Kelley, US Navy - Corpsman
- Chad Smith as Jason "Flea" Mabry, US Navy - Marksman
- Akosua Busia as Patience Ozokwor
- Peter Mensah as Commander Samuel Terwase
- Charles Ingram as Demetrius "Silk" Owens, US Navy - Sniper
- Cornelia Hayes O'Herlihy as Sister Siobhan O'Connor
- Pierrino Mascarino as Father Giovanni Fianni
- Sammi Rotibi as Arthur Azuka, son of Nigeria President Samuel Azuka
- Benjamin Ochieng as Colonel Emanuel Okeze, bodyguard of Arthur Azuka

The cast included African refugees living in the United States, some of whom were from the group known as the 'Lost Boys of Sudan'.

== Production ==
Harry Humphries, a former U.S. Navy SEAL, was the technical adviser to the film, having advised the earlier Black Hawk Down. According to the Blu-ray factoid, the aircraft carrier scenes were filmed aboard the active USS Harry S. Truman, 60 miles (97 km) east of Cape Hatteras in the Atlantic Ocean. The Navy repeatedly turned the carrier so that director Antoine Fuqua would have beneficial lighting conditions.

Fuqua has stated that he and Bruce Willis did not get along with each other during the making of this film.

== Lawsuit ==
Bruce Willis filed a negligence lawsuit against Revolution Studios for injuries suffered during filming. Willis claimed he was struck by a projectile on the forehead which caused him "substantial mental and physical injuries." No specific monetary damages were specified.

== Release ==
The movie was released in U.S. theaters on March 7, 2003, having premiered earlier on March 3. The 20-minutes longer "Director's Extended Cut" was released on DVD in 2005 and begins with the killing of the Nigerian president, adding political context. The Blu-ray theatrical cut was released in September 2006, containing low-definition deleted scenes instead of that extended cut.

== Reception ==
=== Critical response ===
On review aggregator website Rotten Tomatoes, Tears of the Sun holds an approval rating of 34% based on 155 reviews and an average rating of 4.93/10. The website's critical consensus states that the film "tries to be high-minded, but in the end, it's just a stylish action movie." On Metacritic, the film has a weighted average score of 48 out of 100, based on 36 critics, indicating "mixed or average reviews". Audiences polled by CinemaScore gave the film an average grade of "A−" on an A+ to F scale.

Roger Ebert gave the film three stars out of four and said, "Tears of the Sun is a film constructed out of rain, cinematography and the face of Bruce Willis. These materials are sufficient to build a film almost as good as if there had been a better screenplay." David Sterritt of Christian Science Monitor stated that "the result is hardly a subtle film, but it has a stronger sense of combat's real costs and consequences than more sensationalistic pictures like Black Hawk Down and We Were Soldiers provide."

=== Director’s opinion ===
In retrospect, Antoine Fuqua shared his frustration with Tears of the Sun's production. He initially wanted to tell a raw, realistic story about human suffering in war, especially focusing on the African crisis. However, he faced pressure from the studio to make the film more commercially viable by putting more of a focus on its action elements. Fuqua said, “There was an opportunity to say something real,” but as production went on, he felt the studio shifted gears, saying, "It got very real... and all of a sudden people started saying, 'Wow, we want to make sure this makes money, we want to market this, it needs to be more of an action movie.'" Fuqua explains that the focus on action undermined the film's original humanitarian message: “It became very frustrating for me because I found myself doing more of an action movie, which is not what I wanted to do.” Regarding his collaboration with Bruce Willis, Fuqua admits their visions clashed, making their working relationship difficult. He said, “Bruce got pissed. I got pissed. We saw two different movies.” He also acknowledged the challenge of working with a star of Willis's stature: "He's the bigger star. It's hard to fight that. People pay to see him." Fuqua felt this dynamic, combined with their differing creative visions, created tension on set, ultimately forcing him to make compromises on the film's direction.

== See also ==
- List of films featuring the United States Navy SEALs
