= Arnold Rifkin =

American film producer

Arnold Rifkin is an American film producer. He founded Cheyenne Enterprises in 1999. Rifkin has produced a number of films that star Bruce Willis such as The Whole Ten Yards (2004), Hostage (2005), 16 Blocks (2006) and Live Free or Die Hard (2007), the latter of which he served as an executive producer.

== Select filmography ==
He was a producer in all films unless otherwise noted.

=== Film ===
Year	Film	Credit
2000	Disney's The Kid	Executive producer
2001	After Image	Executive producer
2001	Bandits	
2002	Hart's War	
2002	The Crocodile Hunter: Collision Course	
2003	Tears of the Sun	
2004	The Whole Ten Yards	
2005	Hostage	
2006	16 Blocks	
2006	Just My Luck	
2007	Live Free or Die Hard	Executive producer
2007	Who's Your Caddy?	
2007	Timber Falls	
2008	Deception	
2008	Stag Night	
2009	Night Train	
2009	Blood and Bone	Executive producer
2009	Black Water Transit	
2011	Dum Maaro Dum	Executive producer
2015	Wild Horses	Executive producer
2016	Sacrifice	
2017	Hangman	
2018	Dancing with Sancho Panza	Executive producer
2020	The Orchard	Executive producer
2020	Origin Unknown	

Thanks

Year	Film	Role
1984	Heartbreakers	Thanks
1994	The Glass Shield	Special thanks: William Morris Agency
1995	White Man's Burden	Special thanks
1996	The Substance of Fire	Special thanks
1997	Cop Land	The filmmakers wish to thank
1997	Jackie Brown	Very special thanks
2010	Chain Letter	Thank you

=== Television ===
Year	Title	Credit	Notes
2001	Fling	Executive producer	
2002	True West	Executive producer	Television film
2003	The Law and Mr. Lee	Executive producer	Television film
2003	Gary the Rat	Executive producer	
2004	Touching Evil	Executive producer	
2006	Scarlett	Executive producer	Television film
2009	Slangman's World	Executive producer	
2009−15	Full Throttle Saloon	Executive producer	
2016	Holiday Joy	Executive producer	Television film
2017	Celebrate the World! The Hey Wordy! Movie	Executive producer	Television film
