= Hostage (novel) =

2001 thriller novel by Robert Crais

- First edition (US)
- Author: Robert Crais
- Language: English
- Genre: Thriller
- Publisher: Doubleday (US); Orion Books (UK)
- Publication date: 2001
- Publication place: United States

Hostage is a 2001 thriller novel by Robert Crais, set in fictional Bristo Bay, California, about a small town police chief haunted by a failed hostage situation, who must negotiate the same type of situation in his own town if he wants his own family to live.

== Plot ==
Once a top-tier LAPD SWAT hostage negotiator, Jeff Talley resigns after a standoff ended in the deaths of a young boy and his mother. Seeking a life of quiet anonymity, he becomes the Chief of Police in Bristo Bay, a wealthy Los Angeles suburb with very little crime. His professional withdrawal has cost him his marriage; he is separated from his wife, Jane, and estranged from his daughter, Amanda.

Three local drifters, the impulsive Dennis, his younger brother Kevin, and the silent, detached Mars, rob a minimart. The robbery goes awry and the salesclerk is killed. In a panic, the trio flees into a nearby gated community and invades the "smart home" of Walter Smith. They take Smith and his two children, Jennifer and Thomas, hostage. Talley initially arrives at the scene as a first responder but quickly attempts to hand command over to the Ventura County Sheriff’s Department, desperate to avoid the psychological weight of a negotiation.

However, the stakes are far higher than a simple home invasion. Walter Smith is an accountant for a powerful West Coast crime syndicate led by Sonny Benza. In his home office, Smith has two encrypted zip disks (labeled "Marlon" and "Al") containing the financial records and laundering schemes of the entire organization. If the police process the house as a crime scene, the disks will be discovered, leading to the syndicate's destruction. To prevent this, Benza sends the syndicate’s envoy for Smith and "fixer," Glen Howell, to kidnap Talley’s wife and daughter. Howell, in disguise, kidnaps Talley and orders him to reassume command of the hostage crisis, stall the Sheriff’s tactical teams, and find a way to retrieve the disks from the Smith house. If he fails to deliver the disks by the end of the night, his family will be executed.

Talley is forced into a harrowing "triple-negotiation." He must manage the volatile hostage-takers inside the house, deceive the law enforcement officers outside who are suspicious of his erratic behavior, and satisfy the demands of the syndicate. Inside the house, the situation deteriorates as Mars descends into a psychopathic killing spree. Mars kills Dennis and Kevin when they attempt to surrender, then begins hunting the Smith children through the house’s labyrinthine crawlspaces. Talley uses his secret communication with young Thomas Smith, who is hiding in the vents, to locate the disks while simultaneously trying to talk Mars down.

Mars sets the house on fire with Molotov cocktails, intending to take Jennifer and Thomas with him in a murder-suicide. Talley breaches the house under the cover of the smoke and chaos. He confronts Mars, eventually managing to save Jennifer and Thomas and retrieve the disks. However, Walter Smith is severely wounded in the process. With the disks in hand, Talley proceeds to the final exchange at a remote motel, the "Desert Rose." He meets Howell, whom Talley has nicknamed "the Watchman" due to his gold Rolex, and his team of professional hitmen. Talley is exhausted and outgunned, but he returns to his roots as a negotiator, realizing that the syndicate’s professionals only value the disks, not Howell’s leadership.

Talley presents the disks but reveals his final play: he tells the hitmen that he has already contacted the real FBI and that the disks he is holding are decoys. If he doesn't check in, the real evidence will be released. Marion Clewes, the lead hitman, realizes Howell has allowed the situation to become too public and messy. Following the syndicate's cold logic, Marion executes Howell on the spot. Marion allows Talley to take his wife and daughter, and leaves. Soon after, Benza himself is killed while trying to flee the country in retaliation for the fallout on the syndicate. The story concludes with Walter Smith and his family in the witness protection program and Talley reunited with his wife, explaining his traumatic memory of the boy's death and finally moving on from his troubled past.

== Adaptations ==
The novel was adapted to the 2005 thriller film Hostage with Bruce Willis and director Florent Emilio Siri by screenwriter Doug Richardson.
