= The Watcher (2000 film) =

2000 film by Joe Charbanic

- Theatrical poster
- Directed by: Joe Charbanic
- Screenplay by: David Elliot; Clay Ayers
- Story by: Darcy Meyers; David Elliot
- Produced by: Christopher Eberts; Elliott Lewitt; Jeff Rice; Clark Peterson
- Starring: James Spader; Marisa Tomei; Ernie Hudson; Chris Ellis; Keanu Reeves
- Cinematography: Michael Chapman
- Edited by: Richard Nord
- Music by: Marco Beltrami
- Distributed by: Universal Pictures
- Release date: September 8, 2000
- Running time: 97 minutes
- Countries: Canada; United States; Vietnam
- Language: English
- Budget: $33 million
- Box office: $47.2 million

The Watcher is a 2000 thriller film directed by Joe Charbanic and starring James Spader, Marisa Tomei, and Keanu Reeves. Set in Chicago, the film is about a retired FBI agent who is stalked and taunted by a serial killer. The film is an international co-production between Canada, the United States and Vietnam.

== Plot ==
In Los Angeles, FBI Special Agent Joel Campbell is moments too late to save a young woman from a serial killer he has been investigating, who escapes. Campbell quits his job and moves to Chicago where he is plagued by guilt-induced migraines. Campbell attends therapy sessions with Dr. Polly Beilman but otherwise has no friends or social life.

Campbell learns that a woman who lived in his apartment building has been murdered. He does not pay it much attention until he opens his mail and finds that a picture of the woman had been sent to his apartment three days before the murder. He brings this information to the attention of the detective on the case, Mackie, and comes to the conclusion that the same serial killer has arrived in Chicago. FBI Special Agent in Charge Ibby tries to persuade Campbell to return to the case but he refuses.

One night, Campbell receives a phone call from the killer David Allen Griffin, who reveals that he followed Campbell to Chicago and wants to rebuild the "rapport" they once had. Griffin tells Campbell that he will send a photo of a woman in the morning and that Campbell has until 9:00 pm that night to find her. Campbell tells Ibby that he wants back in on the case and his request is granted.

Campbell works together with Mackie and the rest of the team in getting the word out on finding the woman before the deadline. However, by the time Campbell gets her house number and calls, Griffin is already there and has killed her. Griffin suggests that they continue their "game" with a different woman. The following day, Campbell and his team try to find the next intended victim before the 9:00 pm deadline. They corner and almost catch Griffin who once again manages to kill the woman and escape. Later that night, Campbell is found unconscious in his apartment by his colleagues.

The next day, another photo arrives and turns out to be the image of Lisa Anton, Campbell's former lover who was killed by Griffin back in Los Angeles. Campbell goes to Lisa's grave where Griffin is waiting for him. Griffin explains that he has Polly Beilman hostage somewhere and only wants to talk with him. Campbell negotiates for Beilman's safety and Griffin eventually agrees to bring Campbell to see her. During the drive, Griffin explains that he considers Campbell a "good friend" and that the two of them need each other. Campbell secretly uses his cell phone to call Mackie, cluing him in on the situation. Griffin takes Campbell to the warehouse, knocks him out, and restrains him before starting to strangle Beilman. Campbell distracts Griffin by saying 'thank you'. When Griffin asks Campbell to repeat himself, Campbell does, and stabs him in the neck with a pen before shooting him in the shoulder with a double-barrelled shotgun. Campbell rescues Beilman and gets them both to safety as the warehouse explodes, killing Griffin.

When Campbell and Beilman are safe, Campbell goes over to Griffin's charred corpse and looks at it to make sure he is dead.

== Cast ==
- James Spader as FBI Special Agent Joel Campbell
- Marisa Tomei as Dr. Polly Beilman
- Keanu Reeves as David Allen Griffin
- Ernie Hudson as FBI Special Agent in Charge Mike Ibby
- Chris Ellis as Detective Hollis Mackie
- Robert Cicchini as FBI Special Agent Mitch Casper
- Jenny McShane as FBI Agent Diana
- Gina Alexander as FBI Agent Sharon
- Andrew Rothenberg as FBI Agent Jack Fray
- David Pasquesi as FBI Agent Norton
- Michael Guido as FBI Agent Mendel
- Mindy Bell as Supervising Agent
- Yvonne Niami as Lisa Marie Anton
- Rebekah Louise Smith as Ellie Buckner, Third Chicago Victim
- Jillian Peterson as Jessica, Fourth Chicago Victim
- Michele DiMaso as Rachel, Jessica's Mother
- Joseph Sikora as Skater
- Jimmy Star as FBI Agent (uncredited)

== Production ==
Music video director Joe Charbanic had an idea for a low budget thriller about a cat-and-mouse game between an FBI agent and a serial killer. Charbanic worked together on the initial draft then titled Macon and took the project to producer Christopher Eberts with Interlight soon acquiring the project intent on reshaping it into more of an action film. In order to assure authenticity, Charbanic consulted with the actual FBI and Chicago Police Department obtaining both their insight on the technical details as well as gaining their permission to feature their organizations in the film. In the initial draft of the screenplay, Campbell used a wheelchair but after the release of The Bone Collector, this trait was removed.

=== Casting ===
Charbanic had been friends with Keanu Reeves after having directed a number of music videos for his band, Dogstar, and was insistent on casting Reeves as killer David Allen Griffin as he was interested in seeing Reeves play against type as the villain. Reeves has stated that he was not interested in the script but was forced into doing the film when Charbanic forged his signature on a contract. He performed the role rather than get involved in a lengthy legal battle. Reeves was forced to accept 'union scale' salary, while James Spader and Marisa Tomei earned $1 million apiece for their work.

After Universal Pictures acquired the film's domestic rights, Universal reached an agreement with Reeves in which he would not disclose what had happened until 12 months after the film's US release; in return, Universal agreed to downplay Reeves's involvement in marketing, and Universal asked the film's producers to enhance Reeves's profit participation (which led Reeves to ultimately receive an additional $2 million). He was unhappy with the fact that his role, which was originally written as little more than a cameo, turned into a lead while he was still being paid scale in contrast to the other leads. The Watcher (originally known as Driven before a film of that same name was announced) was filmed between October and December 1999 on location in Chicago, Illinois and Oak Park, Illinois.

This movie featured the 1996 hit "6 Underground" performed by Sneaker Pimps.

== Reception ==
The film was panned by film critics. On Rotten Tomatoes, it holds a score of 11% based on 92 reviews, with an average rating of 3.5/10. The website's critics consensus reads, "The Watcher has Keanu Reeves cast against type, but the movie is short on thrills, suspense, and believability." Metacritic, which uses a weighted average, assigned a score of 22 out of 100 based on 29 critics, indicating "generally unfavorable reviews". Audiences polled by CinemaScore gave the film an average grade of "C-" on an A+ to F scale. Keanu Reeves earned a Razzie Award nomination as Worst Supporting Actor for his performance, "losing" the award to Barry Pepper for Battlefield Earth.

=== Box office ===
The film opened at the top spot of the North American box office making $9,062,295 USD in its opening weekend. The September 15–17, 2000 weekend had one of the worst box offices since the 1980s. It had a 36% decline in gross earnings the following week but that was enough to keep the film at the top spot. Its total domestic gross was $28,946,615. The film was profitable for domestic distributor Universal Pictures.
