= Hangman (2017 film) =

2017 American film

- Theatrical release poster
- Directed by: Johnny Martin
- Written by: Charles Huttinger; Michael Caissie
- Produced by: Michael Mendelsohn; Arnold Rifkin
- Starring: Al Pacino; Karl Urban; Brittany Snow; Sarah Shahi; Joe Anderson
- Cinematography: Larry Blanford
- Edited by: Jeffrey Steinkamp
- Music by: Frederik Wiedmann
- Production companies: Patriot Pictures; Cheyenne Enterprises
- Distributed by: Saban Films; Lionsgate Films
- Release date: December 22, 2017
- Running time: 98 minutes
- Country: United States
- Language: English
- Box office: $104,503

Hangman is a 2017 American crime thriller film directed by Johnny Martin and written by Charles Huttinger and Michael Caissie. It stars Al Pacino, Karl Urban, Joe Anderson, Sarah Shahi and Brittany Snow. It follows two detectives who try to track down a serial killer who bases his murders on Hangman, the children's guessing game. It was released on December 22, 2017, and received negative reviews from critics.

== Plot ==
Confronting the driver of a hit-and-run van in Monroe, Georgia, Detective Ray Archer notices a gothic pendant dangling from the rear-view mirror.

One year later, reporter Christi Davies accompanies Detective Will Ruiney to the scene of a murder: a teacher has been hanged outside her school, with the letter "O" carved into her chest. Inside, they find a classroom staged by the killer, with two mannequins playing Hangman, with Ruiney's and Archer's badge numbers carved into a desk. Although retired, Archer joins the investigation, and Captain Lisa Watson warns Davies not to interfere. The coroner reveals that the victim, Carrie Cooper, had frequently been treated for broken bones. Searching Cooper's apartment with Davies, the detectives determine that Cooper was dating someone named Joey Truman, and they find her bedroom covered in blood, with BDSM equipment in her closet.

At Truman's address, they question a woman—revealed to be Joey Truman—who attempts to flee but is arrested. She claims that Cooper's prior injuries were part of their relationship, and denies killing her. Truman attempts suicide but survives, and her alibi is confirmed. Some of the blood from Cooper's bedroom is determined to belong to a felon named David Green, who the detectives trace to a church. There, the killer escapes after hanging another victim—carved with an "N" and wearing a pig's head, with his Hangman diagram to solve. Green, the church's pastor, explains that an unknown assailant took blood from him months before. Ruiney realizes that the killer will claim seven more victims, with a new murder every night.

The FDA stamp on the pig's head leads the detectives and Davies to a slaughterhouse and the body of Eric Anderson, carved with an "M". Archer deduces that they should search the nearby river, recovering Anderson's car. Ruiney is forced to accept that the unsolved murder of his wife Jessica was committed by the Hangman Killer; she was his first victim, carved with a "V". At Anderson's home, they discover a model railroad replica of Monroe, pointing them to the next victim. They find him hanging above railroad tracks, alive and carved with a "C", but are unable to save him from an oncoming train. The detectives learn that this victim was responsible for the car accident that paralyzed Captain Watson, indicating that she is the killer's next target.

Racing to her home, they rescue Watson from the Hangman's noose before he can finish carving a letter. Ruiney discovers the body of a police officer as the Hangman slips past Archer in the officer's uniform. Fleeing by motorcycle, the killer is pursued by the detectives and Davies, but escapes when their car is struck by a semi-trailer truck. Joey Truman, the next victim, is found carved with a "T", with Archer saying that this was revenge for the pair saving Watson. Knowing that the killer was inactive between Jessica's murder and the night when he took Green's blood, the detectives track down Adam Kellerman, who served a prison sentence for assault during the same period, and later sold Anderson the model town. Raiding Kellerman's toy store, they discover him dead from an apparent suicide, surrounded by evidence indicating that he was the Hangman.

However, Davies is abducted by the real Hangman, but tears off his necklace. Taking her to a mausoleum, he places her in a noose rigged to a ceiling fan. Discovering that Davies has been taken, Archer finds the pendant and realizes that the Hangman is the driver whom he arrested a year ago. Watson phones with news that the killer is live streaming a video of Davies online, leading them to the mausoleum, where Archer confronts the Hangman.

It is revealed that as a child, the Hangman witnessed his father's suicide after receiving an eviction notice; he blames Archer, the police officer who arrived on the scene, for failing to save him from abusive foster care. Ruiney shoots and wounds the Hangman, and the detectives free Davies. As Ruiney grapples with the Hangman, Archer throws the killer off a staircase, but he suffers a fatal head injury. Ruiney notices the Hangman's completed word—"EVICTIONEM" (Latin for "eviction")—and shoots him dead. At Archer's funeral, Ruiney receives an ominous note: a new game of Hangman.

== Cast ==
- Al Pacino as Detective Ray Archer
- Karl Urban as Detective Will Ruiney
- Sarah Shahi as Captain Lisa Watson
- Brittany Snow as Christi Davies
- Joe Anderson as Hangman

== Production ==
Principal photography on the film began in Atlanta, Georgia, on November 17, 2016.

== Reception ==
On review aggregator Rotten Tomatoes, the film holds an approval rating of 5%, based on 22 reviews, with an average rating of 3.2/10. On Metacritic, the film has a weighted average score of 31 out of 100, based on eight critics reviews, indicating "generally unfavorable" reviews.
