= Our Stories Films =

American film studio

Our Stories Films is an American film studio founded on July 13, 2006, by Robert L. Johnson to produce "comedic, family-friendly feature films for African American and urban audiences". It began as a joint venture between RLJ Companies and The Weinstein Company. It is based in Los Angeles with offices in New York City. On August 31, 2006, it was announced that Tracey Edmonds was named president and chief operating officer of Our Stories Films, making her the first African American to head a film studio.

The studio's first film, Who's Your Caddy?, was released on July 27, 2007.

On May 6, 2011, Our Stories Films released Jumping the Broom through TriStar Pictures and opened to mixed reviews, but had a highly successful opening weekend box office number. Kevin Thomas of the Los Angeles Times gave Jumping the Broom a positive review, however, and called it: "An exuberant comedy. Fun, smart, and heart tugging with a sparkling ensemble cast." Jumping the Broom was released on DVD and Blu-ray on August 9, 2011.
