= Reasonable Doubt (2014 film) =

- Theatrical release poster
- Directed by: Peter Howitt (as Peter P. Croudins) (Note: The director disowned the film before release so is credited under a pseudonym.)
- Written by: Peter A. Dowling
- Produced by: Frank Buchs; Fredrik Malmberg; Silvio Muraglia; David Valleau; Daniel Wagner
- Starring: Dominic Cooper; Samuel L. Jackson
- Cinematography: Brian Pearson
- Edited by: Richard Schwadel
- Music by: James Jandrisch
- Production companies: Bavariapool; Eagle Vision; Paradox Entertainment; South Creek Pictures; Voltage Pictures; Summit Entertainment
- Distributed by: Entertainment One Films (Canada); Koch Films (Germany)
- Release date: January 17, 2014
- Running time: 91 minutes
- Countries: Canada; Germany
- Language: English
- Budget: $8 million

Reasonable Doubt (also known as The Good Samaritan) is a 2014 Canadian-German crime thriller film directed by Peter Howitt and written by Peter A. Dowling. The film stars Samuel L. Jackson, Dominic Cooper, Erin Karpluk, Gloria Reuben and Ryan Robbins. It received generally negative reviews from critics.

== Plot ==
While driving home in a state of intoxication after celebrating winning a court case, ambitious young Chicago District Attorney Mitch Brockden (Dominic Cooper) is accidentally involved in a fatal hit and run. In an effort to preserve his legal career, he covers it up. Clinton Davis (Samuel L. Jackson), a 55-year-old car mechanic (whose wife and child had been killed in a home invasion by a parolee) is arrested for the murder, and has reported ties to a series of other unexplained crimes. Brockden becomes the prosecutor for the case and ensures that Davis is acquitted for the crime. After another man is mysteriously murdered in a similar manner as previous unsolved cases soon after Davis' release, Brockden and Det. Blake Kanon (Gloria Reuben) suspect that Davis is a serial killer who murders parolees in an attempt to prevent them committing further crimes.

Brockden searches Davis' house for evidence to prove his suspicions. At the same time, his stepbrother Jimmy Logan (Ryan Robbins) tails Davis to a warehouse. While on the phone with Brockden, Logan is attacked by Davis leaving him in a coma. Brockden is arrested by the police and while in custody, Davis threatens to kill Brockden's wife (Erin Karpluk). He breaks out of prison to stop him. In a confrontation, Brockden is wounded by Davis, but is saved when Detective Kanon fatally shoots Davis. During the aftermath, Brockden introduces Logan to his wife and infant daughter.

== Cast ==
- Dominic Cooper as Mitch Brockden
- Samuel L. Jackson as Clinton Davis
- Erin Karpluk as Rachel Brockden
- Gloria Reuben as Det. Blake Kanon
- Ryan Robbins as Jimmy Logan
- Dylan Taylor as Stuart Wilson
- Karl Thordarson as Cecil Akerman
- Dean Harder as Terry Roberts
- Carson Nattrass as Officer Travis
- John B. Lowe as Judge G. Mckenna
- Philippe Brenninkmeyer as DA Jones
- Jessica Burleson as Secretary
- Kelly Wolfman as Dr. Brown

== Production ==
The production of the film began on November 19, 2012 and shot in Winnipeg, Canada. It was also filmed in Chicago and shot over 27 days. Its production budget was $8 million.

== Release ==
In May 2013, Lionsgate Films picked up the rights of distribution in the United States and Voltage Pictures distributed the film internationally.

== Reception ==
Reasonable Doubt received generally negative reviews. As of June 2020, Rotten Tomatoes, a review aggregator, surveyed eight reviews and judged one review to be positive. Jeannette Catsoulis of The New York Times commented that the plotting was "indifferent", the direction was "flaccid" and that Dominic Cooper's portrayal of a flawed hero failed to capture the audience's sympathy. Gary Goldstein of the Los Angeles Times called the film "contrived and predictable". Scott Foundas of Variety magazine wrote that the film was made "...with all the enthusiasm of a career middle-manager dutifully punching a clock." Frank Scheck of The Hollywood Reporter felt the film wasted the time of the audience and commented that Cooper never elicited the audience's sympathy for his character.
