= The Crocodile Hunter: Collision Course =

- Theatrical release poster by Drew Struzan
- Directed by: John Stainton
- Screenplay by: Holly Goldberg Sloan
- Story by: John Stainton
- Produced by: Judy Bailey; Arnold Rifkin; John Stainton
- Starring: Steve Irwin; Terri Irwin; Magda Szubanski; David Wenham
- Cinematography: David Burr
- Edited by: Suresh Ayyar; Bob Blasdall
- Music by: Mark McDuff
- Production companies: Metro-Goldwyn-Mayer Pictures; The Best Picture Show Company; Cheyenne Enterprises
- Distributed by: MGM Distribution Co. (United States); 20th Century Fox (International)
- Release dates: 12 July 2002 (United States); 26 July 2002 (United Kingdom); 12 September 2002 (Australia)
- Running time: 90 minutes
- Countries: Australia; United States; United Kingdom
- Language: English
- Budget: $12 million
- Box office: $33.4 million

The Crocodile Hunter: Collision Course is a 2002 adventure comedy film based on the nature documentary television series The Crocodile Hunter. It stars Steve Irwin, his wife Terri Irwin in her film debut, Magda Szubanski, and David Wenham, and was directed by frequent Irwin collaborator John Stainton. Released in between the series' fourth and fifth seasons, Collision Course follows Steve and Terri attempting to save a crocodile from "poachers", unaware that the two men are actually American CIA agents on their trail because the crocodile has unwittingly swallowed a satellite tracking beacon. This was Steve Irwin's final film appearance before his death in 2006.

The film was theatrically released on 12 July 2002 in the United States by Metro-Goldwyn-Mayer Pictures and internationally by 20th Century Fox. It received mixed reviews but grossed $33.4 million on a $12 million budget.

== Plot ==
In outer space, a United States-owned satellite explodes due to a malfunction. One of its last remaining pieces, a surveillance beacon, falls to Earth and lands in Australia, only to be swallowed by a large crocodile. At the CIA, Agent Buckwhiler and Deputy Director Reynolds reveal that, in the wrong hands, the beacon's data could change the axis of power in the world, so they send two agents, Robert Wheeler and Vaughn Archer, to Australia to retrieve the beacon. Department Director Ansell also secretly hires an operative of his own, Jo Buckley, to go and retrieve the beacon before Wheeler and Archer, so Ansell can take Reynolds' job.

In Australia, the crocodile that swallowed the beacon lives in a river next to the house of Brozzie Drewitt, a violent cattle station owner who is planning to kill the animal for preying on her cattle. Because of this, the Department of Fauna and Fisheries sends one of its workers, Sam Flynn, to Brozzie's house. He attempts to convince her to hire some professionals to relocate the crocodile instead, since killing it would be illegal. Despite Flynn's suggestion, Brozzie attempts to kill the crocodile later that night, only to fail.

Meanwhile, the Crocodile Hunter Steve Irwin and his wife Terri are filming an episode of their TV show on the "less loveable of Australia's wildlife" when they are hired by Flynn to relocate the crocodile that has been bothering Brozzie. After some difficulty, Steve manages to catch the crocodile and successfully gets it in his boat. Wheeler and Archer are nearby using GPS technology to track the beacon. When the two agents see Steve and Terri in their boat with the crocodile (and therefore the beacon) on board, they assume that the Irwins have found the beacon. They inform the CIA, who assume that the Irwins may plan to use the beacon to pay for a multimillion-dollar expansion to Australia Zoo. Steve and Terri board up the crocodile in a crate and put it in the back of their truck to drive to a new river system. Wheeler and Archer follow them from behind in a Land Rover Discovery, and when Wheeler hops on the top of the Irwins' truck, Steve believes them to be poachers who want to steal the crocodile. Steve climbs up on the roof and, after a brief fistfight, manages to knock Wheeler off the truck.

When the Irwins reach the Thomson River, Steve opens the crocodile's crate and discovers that it has defecated. In the excrement, he sees a shiny metal object (the beacon), which he mistakes to be an improperly discarded children's spinning top toy. Steve and Terri successfully release the crocodile in the river, but Wheeler and Archer show up again in a boat, determined to get the beacon. Jo Buckley shows up in an ultralight and throws sticks of dynamite down on Wheeler and Archer's boat, destroying it and knocking them into the river. Steve believes that he and Terri are caught up in the middle of a "poacher war" and, not wanting the dynamite to hurt the newly relocated crocodile, uses a rope to lasso the aircraft, causing it to crash in the river, though Buckley survives. She swims to shore to inform Ansell via a phone call that she failed to retrieve the beacon. Ansell, now on the run from the CIA after his interference in the mission was discovered, is found by the police and arrested.

Due to Wheeler and Archer's failure to retrieve the beacon, the CIA decides that it is time for drastic measures, so they call up American President George W. Bush in the White House and request permission to use military helicopters to find the Irwins and get the beacon. In Australia, Steve is ending his show and playing with the beacon, when the military helicopters arrive.

In an epilogue, Steve explains that he returned the beacon to the CIA without hassle, but remains oblivious to its significance. Brozzie becomes a volunteer for the Department of Fauna and Fisheries, while the CIA punishes Wheeler and Archer for their failure by sending them to work at the Irwins' zoo as volunteers. All parties involved have trouble adapting to their new environments, but Steve assures the audience that he will help them.

== Cast ==
- Steve Irwin as Himself
- Terri Irwin as Herself
- Magda Szubanski as Brozzie Drewitt
- David Wenham as Sam Flynn
- Lachy Hulme as Robert Wheeler
- Aden Young as Ron Buckwhiler
- Kenneth Ransom as Vaughn Archer
- Kate Beahan as Jo Buckley
- Steve Vidler as Department Director Ansell
- Steve Bastoni as Deputy Director Reynolds
- Sui (Steve and Terri's Staffordshire Bull Terrier) as Herself
- Robert Coleby as Dr. Weinberger
- Timothy Bottoms as U.S. President George W. Bush

== Production ==
Due to the series' immense popularity, director/producer Stainton had developed an idea for a feature-length Crocodile Hunter film in 1999 while shooting a documentary in Africa. He wanted to make a good film, but, at the same time, make it easy for Steve who was not used to acting, believing that Irwin should only play himself. It was Stainton's idea to film Steve and Terri doing a traditional nature documentary in the Australian Outback and film these scenes in a 1:85 screen ratio. In fact, nothing for the "documentary" scenes was ever scripted, and when the actors (from the scripted dramatic scenes that use a 2:40 screen ratio) entered the Irwins' world for a few brief scenes, Steve (who did not know anything about the script or plot) was informed by Stainton what was about to happen so Irwin could prepare and ad-lib as much as he wanted or needed.

Cheyenne Enterprises, a film and television production company owned by Bruce Willis and producer Arnold Rifkin, showed interest in producing and helping finance the project. MGM then showed interest in distributing the film worldwide, and principal photography began in November 2001 after having filmed the non-scripted documentary segments for well over a year. The Irwins came across hundreds of animals for the filming of the documentary scenes, but only a few—the kangaroo, the perentie, the bird-eating spider, and two snakes—made it into the film. The animals they encountered were re-written into the script by Holly Goldberg-Sloan for the dramatic scenes when Wheeler and Archer encounter the Irwins' truck.

The film is also known for its "special shoot" teaser trailer, set in the MGM logo, with Steve interacting with Leo the Lion, MGM's mascot.

== Film aspect ratios ==
Collision Course was shot in two film aspect ratios, 1.85:1 for the scenes with Steve and Terri and 2.35:1 for the plot about the Australian farmer and the CIA and their efforts to find the tracking drone. In theatres and on DVD, the 1.85:1 image appears with pillar boxing, a format usually reserved for 1.33:1 ratio content appearing within 1.85:1 or 2.35:1 frames. On the fullscreen versions, the windowboxing (mostly in the scenes with Steve and Terri and the finale) is not present due to the fullscreen process cropping the widescreen image to the 1.33:1 ratio, causing the windowboxing borders not to be shown, even when shown on a widescreen television if the image is stretched as per fullscreen programs usually are.

== Reception ==
=== Critical response ===
The Crocodile Hunter: Collision Course holds a 53% approval rating on Rotten Tomatoes, based on 88 reviews. The site's consensus states: "Aside from the unnecessary plot about a downed US spy satellite, there's not much difference between the movie and the TV show." Metacritic, which uses a weighted average, assigned the film a score of 50 out of 100, based on 23 critics, indicating "mixed or average" reviews.

Roger Ebert gave the film three out of four stars, stating "You see a couple of likable people journeying through the outback, encountering dangerous critters and getting too close for comfort, while lecturing us on their habits and dangers and almost being killed by them." Robert K. Elder of the Chicago Tribune said, "Irwin and his director never come up with an adequate reason why we should pay money for what we can get on television for free." Audiences polled by CinemaScore gave the film an average grade of "B+" on an A+ to F scale.

=== Box office ===
The film made $28.4 million at the American box office, with a worldwide gross of $33.4 million, which against the production budget of $12 million, makes the film a considerable box office success.

=== Accolades ===
Year	Award	Category	Result
2003	Young Artist Award	Best Family Feature Film - Comedy	Won

== Home media ==
The Crocodile Hunter: Collision Course was released to VHS and DVD in the United States on 17 December 2002. A soundtrack album was released at a similar time. The movie's soundtrack would later appear on The Crocodile Hunter coin-operated kiddie ride, manufactured by Kiddy Rides Australia, as background audio. The film was released on Blu-Ray Disc on 25 April 2023.

== Soundtrack ==
No.	Title	Length
1.	"Crocodile Rock" (Baha Men)	3:50

== See also ==
- The Crocodile Hunter
