= 16 Blocks =

2006 film by Richard Donner

- Theatrical release poster
- Directed by: Richard Donner
- Written by: Richard Wenk
- Produced by: Avi Lerner; Randall Emmett; John Thompson; Arnold Rifkin; Jim Van Wyck
- Starring: Bruce Willis; Mos Def; David Morse; Cylk Cozart
- Cinematography: Glen MacPherson
- Edited by: Steven Mirkovich
- Music by: Klaus Badelt
- Production companies: Alcon Entertainment; Millennium Films; Cheyenne Enterprises; Emmett/Furla Films; The Donners' Company; Equity Pictures; Nu Image Films
- Distributed by: Warner Bros. Pictures
- Release date: March 3, 2006
- Running time: 102 minutes
- Country: United States
- Language: English
- Budget: $52 million
- Box office: $65.7 million

16 Blocks is a 2006 American action thriller film directed by Richard Donner and starring Bruce Willis, Mos Def, and David Morse. The film unfolds in the real time narration method. It marked the final directed film for Donner during his lifetime in addition to the last acting role for his cousin and frequent collaborator Steve Kahan.

16 Blocks was released by Warner Bros. Pictures on March 3, 2006. The film received mixed to positive reviews from critics and grossed $65.7 million against a $52 million budget.

== Plot ==
Jack Mosley is an alcoholic, burned-out NYPD detective. Despite a grueling late shift the night before, his lieutenant orders him to escort a witness, Eddie Bunker, from local custody to the courthouse sixteen blocks away to testify on a police corruption case before a grand jury at 10 a.m. Bunker tries to be friendly with Mosley, telling him of his aspirations to move to Seattle and open a bakery with his sister whom he has never met, but Mosley is uninterested and insists on stopping at a liquor store.

Hired assassins shoot up the escort car, and Mosley drags Bunker to his favorite bar to take shelter and call for backup. Mosley's former partner, Frank Nugent, and several other officers arrive. Nugent admits that he is one of the officers named in the corruption case. The corrupt cops try to frame Bunker for firing at an officer, but Mosley intervenes, rescuing Bunker and fleeing.

Mosley briefly stops at his sister Diane's apartment and learns that the police have already approached her about his activities earlier that day. As he and Bunker elude their pursuers, Mosley is wounded. They become cornered in a run-down apartment building as Nugent and his men search floor by floor. Mosley calls the district attorney's office but purposely gives the wrong apartment number, suspecting there is a mole involved.

As the men rush to the incorrect location, Mosley and Bunker use the distraction to escape onto a passenger bus. The bus crashes into a construction site and is surrounded by the ESU. Not wanting the passengers to get caught up in crossfire, Mosley allows them to go free while enabling Bunker to escape in the chaos. Mosley finds a tape recorder while going through the passengers' luggage and prepares a farewell message to Diane.

To his surprise, Bunker returns to the bus. His tenacity convinces Mosley to keep fighting, and he drives the bus into an alley, temporarily blocking the police from following them. He finds that Bunker has been wounded and calls his sister, Diane, a paramedic, for help. Diane treats Bunker and arranges for a second ambulance to take them to the hospital. Bunker learns that Mosley is also due to be named in the investigation but is willing to testify in his place. Mosley gets off a block from the courthouse and wishes Bunker luck with his bakery, instructing the paramedic to put Bunker on a bus for Seattle. Bunker promises to send him a cake on his birthday.

Mosley continues to the courthouse, where the police and ESU are waiting. Entering through the underground garage, he again refuses Nugent's pleas not to testify. Nugent then orders one of his men to gun down Mosley as he enters, but an ESU sniper kills the shooter. Mosley informs the district attorney that he will testify in exchange for Bunker having his record expunged, also revealing that he had recorded the conversation with Nugent in the garage on the tape recorder, which he submits as evidence.

Two years later, Mosley is freed from prison. He celebrates his birthday with Diane and other friends and is surprised to find that the cake had indeed come from Bunker, who has been successful in starting "Eddie & Jack's Good Sign Bakery" in Seattle.

== Cast ==
- Bruce Willis as Detective Jack Mosley
- Mos Def as Edward "Eddie" Bunker
- David Morse as Detective Frank Nugent
- David Zayas as Detective Bobby Torres
- Casey Sander as Captain Dan Gruber
- Jenna Stern as Diane Mosley
- Cylk Cozart as Detective Jimmy Mulvey
- Richard Fitzpatrick as Deputy Commissioner Wagner
- Peter McRobbie as Mike Sheehan
- Kim Chan as Sam
- Robert Racki as Detective Jerry Shue
- Patrick Garrow as Detective Touhey
- Sasha Roiz as Detective Kaller
- Conrad Pla as Detective Ortiz
- Hechter Ubarry as Detective Edward Maldonado
- Mike Keenan as Ray Fitzpatrick
- Robert Clohessy as Sergeant Cannova
- Jess Mal Gibbons as Pederson
- Tig Fong as Briggs
- Brenda Pressley as Assistant District Attorney MacDonald
- Carmen Lopez as Gracie
- Scott McCord as Lieutenant Kincaid
- Steve Kahan as Restaurant Owner
- Tom Wlaschiha as Bus Passenger
- Toni Ellwand as Subway Commuter
- Rob Wiethoff as Court Officer

Willis originally wanted rapper Ludacris to play the part of Eddie Bunker. 16 Blocks is the second film in which David Morse plays the villain to Bruce Willis as the protagonist; the first was 12 Monkeys.

== Release ==
=== Theatrical ===
The film, released by Warner Bros. Pictures, opened in the United States on March 3, 2006.

==== Alternate ending ====
The film was shot with the ending written for the screenplay (as described by Donner and writer Richard Wenk), but they realized during filming that there was "a better opportunity to have a little more empathy and wrap the picture up in a different way." The ending written for the film has Frank watching Jack get in the elevator, then instructing Bobby to stand down, saying it's over, but Bobby's radio is off and he is still planning on ambushing Jack. In the lobby, Jack is approached by District Attorney McDonald who says he will testify in Eddie's place in return for Eddie's record being expunged. As Jack reaches into his pocket, Bobby appears and Frank, having run upstairs to stop Bobby, leaps in front of Jack to protect him and gets shot, causing them both to fall down the stairs. When they land at the bottom, it's discovered that the bullet went through Frank and fatally hit Jack. The tape recorder with Jack and Frank's conversation on it is heard playing in Jack's pocket. Frank tearfully listens and looks at Jack with sorrow. The tape is taken to the jury, Frank and Bobby are led away, and a blanket is placed over Jack's body. Sometime later, Diane receives a cake from Eddie that was supposed to be for Jack's birthday. There is also a letter from Eddie saying that he sent the cake hoping to hear from Jack, but never did, then he was then informed of what happened. The letter continues with Eddie acknowledging Jack and wishing him a happy birthday.

== Reception ==
=== Box office ===
In its opening weekend, the film grossed $12.7 million, which was the second-highest-grossing film of the weekend. As of its May 15, 2006 closing date, the film grossed a total of $36.895 million in the U.S. box office. It made $65.7 million worldwide. According to Box Office Mojo, production costs were around $55 million. The film made $51.53 million on rentals and remained on the DVD top 50 charts for 17 consecutive weeks.

=== Critical response ===
On Rotten Tomatoes, the film received an approval rating of 55% approval rating from 159 critics, with an average rating of 5.9/10. The site's consensus reads: "Despite strong performances from Bruce Willis and Mos Def, 16 Blocks barely rises above being a shopworn entry in the buddy-action genre." On Metacritic, it has a weighted average score of 63 out of 100, based on 34 reviews, which indicates "generally favorable" reviews. Audiences polled by CinemaScore gave the film an average grade of "B+" on an A+ to F scale.

Michael Atkinson of The Village Voice commented that "the clichés come thick on the ground" and called it "a small movie trying to seem epic, or a bloated monster trying to seem lean." Peter Travers of Rolling Stone gave the film two-and-a-half out of four stars and called Willis and Mos Def "a terrific team," concluding that "Until Richard Wenk's script drives the characters into a brick wall of pukey sentiment, it's a wild ride." Chicago Sun-Times critic Roger Ebert gave it three out of four stars and commended Mos Def for his "character performance that's completely unexpected in an action movie," while calling the film "a chase picture conducted at a velocity that is just about right for a middle-age alcoholic." Wesley Morris of The Boston Globe described the film as admirably old fashioned, praising Donner for his direction, but criticized the film for lacking originality, saying it feels like a remake of The Gauntlet directed by Clint Eastwood.

== Remake ==
In May 2013, Original Entertainment confirmed to have sealed a five-picture deal with Millennium Films to produce Bollywood remakes of Rambo, The Expendables, 16 Blocks, 88 Minutes, and Brooklyn's Finest, with the productions for Rambo and The Expendables expected to start at the end of that year.
