= Benedikt Brydern =

American violinist and composer

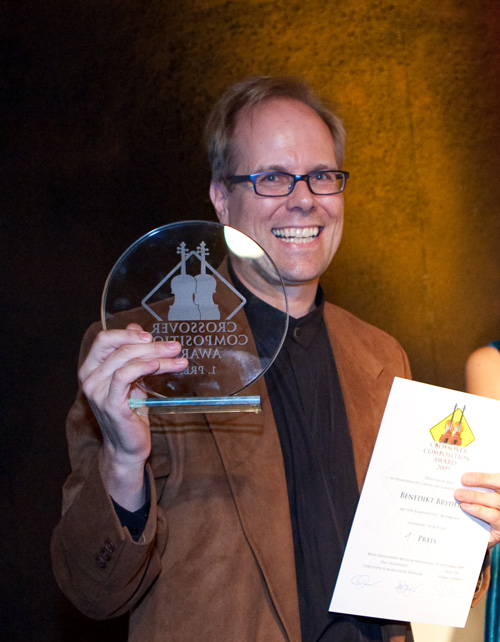
- Born: Benedikt Brydern; 30 January 1966 (age 60); Karlsruhe, Germany
- Education: University of Southern California
- Occupation: Composer
- Years active: 1993–present
- Website: https://www.consordino.com

Benedikt Brydern started as a musical protege on the violin giving his first public concerts at the age of 10. He lives in Los Angeles now and composes for film and the concert hall. He has won numerous awards and competitions. He studied with film composers David Raksin, Bruce Broughton, Christopher Young and Elmer Bernstein at the University of California Thornton School of Music in Los Angeles.Immediately after graduation he composed music for Jon Voight's Showtime film The Tin Soldier.

== Composer credits ==
- The Protos Experiment (2025 film)
- Echoes of Fear (2019 film)
- Sacrifice (2016 film)
- Stag Night
- The Pagan Queen
- Standing Ovation
- Dark Remains
- The Wild and Wonderful Whites of West Virginia
- Jaded

== Performer credits ==
- Terminator: The Sarah Connor Chronicles (soundtrack)
- Midwinter Graces
- Yanni Voices
- The Dream Concert: Live from the Great Pyramids of Egypt
- Live at El Morro, Puerto Rico

== Honors and awards ==
- 2026 SwanSongsFund -NewVoices Choir 3rd Place Composition Competition
- 2026 Laureate 2026 Maurice Gardner Composition Competition
- 2026 Winner and Audience Award Tampa Bay Symphony 9th International Composition Competition
- 2025 Finalist Tampa Bay Symphony 8th International Composition Competition
- 2024 Atlanta Master Chorale First Inaugural Composition Competition Winner
- 2024 Rapido Composition Competition National Finalist
- 2020 Semi-Finalist Gustav Mahler Preis, Austria
- 2020 National Finalist Rapido Cycle Six Composition Contest, Atlanta , GA
- 2015 First Prize 3rd “Crossover Composition Award” 2015
- 2009 Silver Unicorn for Best Soundtrack “Pagan Queen” Estepona Fantastic Film Festival/Spain
- 2009 Crossover Composition Competition 1st Prize
- 2003 Winner 3. Marmor Foundation Chamber Music Composition Competition Stanford University
- 2002 Winner William Lincer Foundation Award
