= Black Water Transit =

2009 film by Tony Kaye

- Directed by: Tony Kaye
- Screenplay by: Matthew Chapman
- Based on: Black Water Transit by Carsten Stroud
- Produced by: Michael Cerenzie; Christopher Eberts; Kia Jam; Robert Katz; Paul Parmar; Arnold Rifkin
- Starring: Laurence Fishburne; Karl Urban; Brittany Snow; Aisha Tyler; Stephen Dorff
- Running time: 100 minutes
- Country: United States
- Language: English
- Budget: $23–35 million

Black Water Transit is an unreleased 2009 American crime drama film based on the novel of the same name by Carsten Stroud. It is directed by Tony Kaye and stars an ensemble cast including Laurence Fishburne and Karl Urban.

== Premise ==
In post-Katrina New Orleans, shipping executive Jack Vermillion (Fishburne) finds himself getting more than he bargained for after agreeing to help feds expose smuggler and all-around bad seed Earl Pike (Urban).

== Cast ==
- Laurence Fishburne as Jack Vermillion
- Karl Urban as Earl Pike
- Brittany Snow as Sardoonah
- Aisha Tyler as Casey Spandau
- Stephen Dorff as Nicky
- Alex Sol as Jimmy Rock
- Beverly D'Angelo as Valeriana Schick
- Bill Cobbs as Frank Vermillion
- Evan Ross as Gary Vermillion
- Leslie Easterbrook as Bet Tannen

At various points in the film's development, Bruce Willis, Vin Diesel, and Samuel L. Jackson were attached to star.

== Production ==
Bruce Willis and Arnold Rifkin had initially produced the film under their Cheyenne Enterprises banner at Revolution Studios. Samuel Bayer was attached to direct in 2005. Doug Richardson had written the initial draft. In a blog post about his experience, he claimed that the screenplay was one of the best he had ever written, and he was on development for two years until he was let go. After Tony Kaye had signed on, one of the producers wanted to bring Richardson back on board. After meeting with Kaye in person, Richardson turned down the offer to return, referring to Kaye as a "lunatic". Filming took place in and around New Orleans between June and August 2007. Filming locations included the French Quarter, the 9th Ward and local military installations.

== Post-production ==
In August 2008, Kaye revealed to the Los Angeles Times that he had recently screened a rough-cut of the film to actor Laurence Fishburne. According to Kaye, his lead "loved" the film, which had originally been conceived as a Die Hard–like thriller. However, Kaye suggested his script changes were used as an excuse by producer David Bergstein to hold back payments on the film, and that Bergstein was attempting to alleviate his financial trouble by casting doubt on the film's bankability.

On April 8, 2009, the production company came to an agreement with Cayman Islands-based financier Aramid Entertainment for the completion and release schedule for the film, which, at that point, remained unfinished. According to legal documents, Bergstein requested a sum of $1,775,000 for post-production.

In May 2009, Kaye reportedly screened a cut of the film at the Cannes Film Market. In July 2009, Aramid Entertainment provided a notice of default regarding the agreement to complete and release Black Water Transit, noting that the production company had failed to provide some of the necessary signatures for the agreement.

In November 2009, Bergstein and his co-producer Ron Tutor were sued by a New York–based hedge fund for $120 million. Bergstein and Tutor both confirmed that Kaye had delivered a cut of the film. However, both reiterated that the film was "unreleasable".

In January 2010, it was reported that Bergstein had reached a settlement in another lawsuit related to the film.

In June 2010, the rights for Black Water Transit, valued at $26 million, were sold by Library Asset Acquisition Company (LAAC) to Black Water Transit Acquisition Company at a foreclosure auction for $2 million. However, as both companies were suspected to be owned by Bergstein and Tutor, the sale was opposed by a key creditor and a federal bankruptcy trustee.

In March 2012, Kaye confirmed the film was still unfinished and that some additional material needed to be shot. He elaborated on the tonal shift of the project. "The film we made so far is not the film they expected," he said. "But as you edit, you learn more about the subject matter, and more about the actors, and nothing is set in stone. Movies are made many times—once in the writing, once in preproduction, once again during the shoot, once again in editing, in post, and again when you put it in the marketplace. These things, they change all the time, and that's what I love about it, the constant reinvention."

In September 2014, it was reported that Bergstein and Aramid Entertainment had reached a settlement in their lawsuit and that the rights for the film would revert to Bergstein, pending a New York bankruptcy court approval.

In May 2016, Bergstein issued a press release regarding a recent complaint by Aramid Entertainment against its former executive, David Molner. The complaint mentioned the project had gone into litigation, with the repayment of Aramid's $17.5 million "Black Water Transit loan" dependent on the outcome. The press release noted that "actions against other firms involved currently remain in litigation."

In June 2018, Bergstein was sentenced to eight years in prison for fraud. Earlier that month, Kaye signed on to direct a screenplay by writer Gary DeVore.
