= Dark Remains =

- Directed by: Brian Avenet-Bradley
- Written by: Brian Avenet-Bradley
- Produced by: Laurence Avenet-Bradley
- Starring: Cherri Christian; Greg Thompson; Scott Hodges
- Cinematography: Laurence Avenet-Bradley
- Edited by: Brian Avenet-Bradley
- Music by: Benedikt Brydern
- Production company: Avenet Images
- Release date: 2005
- Running time: 88 minutes
- Country: United States
- Language: English

Dark Remains 2005 American horror film written and directed by Brian Avenet-Bradley. It stars Greg Thompson, Cheri Christian, and Scott Hodges. A couple believes their dead daughter may be trying to contact them.

== Plot ==
After their daughter Emma dies, Julie and Allen Pyke move to a rural area. In photographs Julie takes of it, she sees images of Emma, whom she believes may want to tell them something.

== Cast ==
- Greg Thompson as Allen Pyke
- Cheri Christian as Julie Pyke
- Scott Hodges as Jim Payne
- Jeff Evans as Sheriff Frank Hodges
- Rachel Jordan as Emma Pyke
- Michelle Kegley as Mrs. Payne
- Rachael Rollings as Rachel Roberts
- Karla Droege as Marianne Shore

== Release ==
Dark Remains was released on home video on December 26, 2006.

== Reception ==
Dennis Harvey of Variety called it "a genuinely creepy ghost story that packs maximum dread per reel". Bloody Disgusting rated it 4/5 stars and wrote: "All in all, unbelievable. Dark Remains is a suspense film the like of which hasn’t been released in a long time." Joshua Siebalt of Dread Central rated it 3.5/5 stars: "All in all, Dark Remains is a very solid ghost story with enough attention to detail and characterization to set it aside from its contemporaries."

Mitchell Wells of Horror Society wrote: "If you are a horror fan, I would really encourage you to watch it and see how the director is greatly influenced by old ghost films as well as new age ones." Mike Long of DVD Talk rated it 2.5/5 stars and wrote that though the films "contains some creepy moments", the film was often boring, confusing, or both.

It was awarded best picture at the 2005 Rhode Island International Horror Film Festival.
