= Hostage (2005 film) =

2005 action thriller film by Florent-Emilio Siri

- Theatrical release poster
- Directed by: Florent Siri
- Screenplay by: Doug Richardson
- Based on: Hostage by Robert Crais
- Produced by: Bruce Willis; Arnold Rifkin; Mark Gordon; Bob Yari
- Starring: Bruce Willis; Kevin Pollak; Ben Foster; Jonathan Tucker
- Cinematography: Giovanni Fiore Coltellacci
- Edited by: Richard Byard; Olivier Gajan
- Music by: Alexandre Desplat
- Production companies: Stratus Film Company; Cheyenne Enterprises
- Distributed by: Miramax Films
- Release date: March 11, 2005
- Running time: 113 minutes
- Country: United States
- Language: English
- Budget: $65 million
- Box office: $77.7 million

Hostage is a 2005 American action thriller film directed by Florent Siri from the screenplay by Doug Richardson. It is based on the 2001 novel of the same name by Robert Crais. The film stars Bruce Willis, Kevin Pollak, Ben Foster, and Jonathan Tucker and follows the police chief who takes place as the negotiator when the family of a wealthy accountant is held hostage by three teenagers.

Hostage was released in the United States on March 11, 2005, by Miramax Films. It received mixed reviews from critics and grossed $78 million worldwide on a budget of $65 million. However, the film found bigger success in home video markets, generated more than $63 million in home video rentals in the United States.

== Plot ==
Former L.A. SWAT officer Jeff Talley is a hostage negotiator in Los Angeles. One day, Talley negotiates with an abusive man who has taken his own wife and son hostage after learning his wife was cheating on him. Shortly after Talley denies a SWAT commander's request to give snipers the order to open fire, the despondent husband kills his wife, son, and himself. Traumatized, Talley moves with his family and becomes police chief in Bristo Camino, a suburban hamlet in nearby Ventura County.

A year later, Talley finds himself in another hostage situation when two teenagers, Dennis Kelly and his brother Kevin, and their accomplice Marshall "Mars" Krupcheck take the accountant Walter Smith and his two children, teenage Jennifer and young Tommy, hostage in Smith's house after a failed robbery attempt. The first officer to respond is shot twice by Mars just before Talley arrives. Talley attempts to rescue the officer, but she dies in front of him. Traumatized and unwilling to put himself through another tragedy, Talley hands authority over to the Ventura County Sheriff's Department and leaves.

Smith has been laundering money for a mysterious criminal syndicate through offshore shell corporations. He was preparing to turn over a batch of important encrypted files recorded on a DVD when he was taken hostage. To prevent the incriminating evidence from being discovered, the syndicate orders someone known only as the Watchman to kidnap Talley's wife and daughter. Talley is instructed to return to the hostage scene, regain authority, and stall for time until the organization can launch its own attack against Smith's house.

Dennis forces Kevin and Mars to tie up the children, while he knocks out Smith and finds a large amount of cash. In an attempt to end the standoff and secure the DVDs himself, Talley meets with Dennis and agrees to provide a helicopter in exchange for half of the money. When the helicopter arrives, Dennis and Kevin bring the money to Talley and prepare to leave, but Mars refuses to leave without Jennifer, with whom he has become infatuated. Talley says the helicopter will only carry three additional people and insists that Jennifer stay behind, but the deal breaks down and the boys return to the house. Talley learns that Mars is a psychopathic killer who could turn on the hostages and his own accomplices at any moment. Mars does, in fact, kill Dennis and Kevin, just as Kevin is about to release the children.

The syndicate sends fake FBI agents to recover the DVD and they storm the house; Talley is instructed to not go near the house. Jennifer stabs Mars and locks herself and Tommy in the panic room. Hearing their screams, Talley breaches the house and is attacked by Mars, who then kills most of the fake agents using his pistol and multiple Molotov cocktails. Mars is then shot in the side by the only surviving agent. The agent tracks down Talley and the children and demands the encrypted DVD. After Talley gives him the DVD, Mars reappears, distracting the agent long enough to be killed by Talley. Mars then prepares to throw his last Molotov, but collapses to his knees, weakened by his injuries. He makes eye contact with Jennifer, then drops the Molotov and immolates himself.

Talley escapes with the children by shooting the indoor glass waterfall, which extinguishes the fire. He and a recovered Smith then go to a rundown inn where Talley's wife and daughter are being held captive by the Watchman and his crew. Smith, feigning hatred for Talley, is freed in exchange for the family. While staging an argument, Smith tips off Talley that the Watchman plans to kill Talley and his family as soon as Smith is released. Smith executes the Watchman with a shot to the head, which allows Talley to kill the other gunmen and rescue his family. After a tearful embrace, the injured Talley loads his family into an ambulance and drives off across the mountains.

== Cast ==
- Bruce Willis as Police Chief Jeff Talley
- Kevin Pollak as Walter Smith
- Ben Foster as Marshall "Mars" Krupcheck
- Jonathan Tucker as Dennis Kelly
- Michelle Horn as Jennifer Smith, Walter's daughter
- Jimmy Bennett as Tommy Smith, Walter's son
- Tina Lifford as Deputy Sheriff Laura Shoemaker
- Kim Coates as The Watchman
- Serena Scott Thomas as Jane Talley, Jeff's wife
- Rob Knepper as Wil Bechler
- Marshall Allman as Kevin Kelly, Dennis's younger brother
- Rumer Willis as Amanda Talley, Jeff & Jane's daughter
- Ransford Doherty as Officer Mike Anders
- Marjean Holden as Officer Carol Flores
- Michael D. Roberts as Bob Ridley, Paramedic
- Art LaFleur as Officer Bill Jorgenson
- Keith Hines as Simmons
- Randy McPherson as Kovak
- Hector Luis Bustamante as Officer Ruiz
- Kathryn Joosten as Officer Louise
- Johnny Messner as Mr. Jones
- Glenn Morshower as Lieutenant Leifitz
- Jamie McShane as Joe Mack
- Jimmy Pinchak as Sean Mack

== Production ==
The film's plot is roughly the same as Crais's novel. The main difference is that the novel's complicated subplot involving powerful West Coast Mafia crime lord Sonny Benza was removed, with the film giving little explanation of Walter Smith's criminal associates. The film also makes the first group of hostage-takers somewhat younger in age than depicted in the novel. In addition, the criminal syndicate in the film was portrayed as mysterious criminals rather than a regular Mafia.

Filming took place in the Malibu area (in western Los Angeles County). The exterior views of Smith's lavishly appointed house were filmed at a real house in the unincorporated Topanga Canyon area, between Malibu and Los Angeles; the interior scenes were done on sound stages in Hollywood.

The character Mars, played by Ben Foster, was modeled after Bay Area rap artist Mars by Robert Crais after a friend Dennis Bsharah urged him to look into the horrorcore genre. In the movie adaptation, Foster strongly resembles the rapper. Jonathan Tucker's name was later changed to Dennis.

The movie's opening scenes were filmed in the Boyle Heights neighborhood of East Los Angeles, just east of downtown.

The fictional city of Bristo Camino was possibly intended to be a representation of Ojai or Moorpark. Bristo Bay is the name of Bristo Camino in the 2001 Robert Crais novel.

== Release ==
In April 2004, Miramax Films acquired North American distribution rights to Hostage after 40 minutes of footage was screened to the studio during principal photography. It was released theatrically on March 11, 2005, after being originally slated for a January 21, 2005 release.

=== Home media ===
Hostage was released on DVD & VHS on June 21, 2005 and Blu-ray + Digital HD on August 23, 2011.

== Reception ==
=== Box office ===
The film earned $34.6 million at the United States box office and a total worldwide gross of $77.6 million.

It made $9.8 million from 2,123 theaters in its opening weekend, finishing fourth.

=== Critical response ===
On Rotten Tomatoes the film holds an approval rating of 35% based on 158 reviews, with an average rating of 5.08/10. The website's critics consensus reads, "Grisly and cliched, audiences may feel they're being held Hostage." On Metacritic, the film has a weighted average score of 44 out of 100, based on 33 critics, indicating "mixed or average" reviews. Audiences polled by CinemaScore gave the film an average grade of "B+" on an A+ to F scale.

Roger Ebert gave the film three stars out of four, writing: "In scenes where a hero must outgun four or five armed opponents, however, Hostage does use the reliable action movie technique of cutting from one target to the next, so that we never see what the others are doing while the first ones are being shot. Waiting for their closeups, I suppose."

In a BBC review of Hostage, Paul Arendt awarded the film three out of five stars, describing it as a violent and exploitative home-invasion thriller built around a late-career action performance by Bruce Willis.

He noted the film’s reliance on sadistic and sensational narrative devices, including threats to the hostages, to generate suspense.

In a review for the Los Angeles Times, Kevin Thomas praised Hostage as a tightly constructed and confidently directed action thriller; and highlighted Bruce Willis for delivering a performance that combines physical intensity with emotional restraint, sustaining credibility under extreme narrative pressure.

== See also ==
- The Aggression Scale—a film with a similar premise
- List of films featuring home invasions
