= Woman Wanted =

- Film poster
- Directed by: Kiefer Sutherland (Note: Sutherland later disavowed the theatrical film and was subsequently credited as Alan Smithee.)
- Written by: Joanna Glass
- Produced by: Christopher Eberts; Damian Lee
- Starring: Holly Hunter; Kiefer Sutherland; Michael Moriarty
- Cinematography: Ric Waite
- Edited by: Paul Seydor
- Music by: Jude Cole
- Production company: Phoenician Entertainment
- Distributed by: Buena Vista Home Entertainment (Note: Distributed under the Touchstone Home Video banner.) (United States); Acteurs Auteurs Associés (Canada)
- Release date: August 14, 1999
- Running time: 110 minutes
- Countries: United States; Canada
- Language: English

Woman Wanted is a 1999 film directed by Kiefer Sutherland (later credited as Alan Smithee). It is based on a novel by Joanna Glass, who also wrote the screenplay. It stars Sutherland, Holly Hunter, Michael Moriarty, and Sutherland's mother, Shirley Douglas.

== Premise ==
The story is about a woman who works as a housekeeper for a widower and his adult son.

== Cast ==
- Kiefer Sutherland as Wendell Goddard
- Holly Hunter as Emma Riley
- Michael Moriarty as Richard Goddard
- Carrie Preston as Monica
- Allegra Fulton as Gracie
- Shirley Douglas as Peg
- Sean McCann as Kevin

== Production ==
Woman Wanted was filmed in Winnipeg, Manitoba. One of the notable features of the film is that "Alan Smithee" is listed as one of the directors, meaning Sutherland effectively disowned the project.

== Reception ==
The film won Best Independent Feature Film at the Ajijic International Film Festival, as well as Best Feature Film at the Slamdunk Film Festival.
