= Bandits (2001 film) =

2001 film directed by Barry Levinson

- Theatrical release poster
- Directed by: Barry Levinson
- Written by: Harley Peyton
- Produced by: Ashok Amritraj; David Hoberman; Arnold Rifkin; Barry Levinson; Paula Weinstein; Michael Birnbaum; Michele Berk
- Starring: Bruce Willis; Billy Bob Thornton; Cate Blanchett
- Cinematography: Dante Spinotti
- Edited by: Stu Linder
- Music by: Christopher Young
- Production companies: Metro-Goldwyn-Mayer Pictures; Hyde Park Entertainment; Empire Pictures; Baltimore Pictures; Spring Creek Productions; Cheyenne Enterprises
- Distributed by: MGM Distribution Co.
- Release date: October 12, 2001
- Running time: 123 minutes
- Country: United States
- Language: English
- Budget: $75 million
- Box office: $67.6 million

Bandits is a 2001 American crime comedy-drama film directed by Barry Levinson and written by Harley Peyton. It stars Bruce Willis, Billy Bob Thornton and Cate Blanchett. The film was released in theaters by MGM Distribution Co. on October 12, 2001. It received mixed reviews from critics and Thornton and Blanchett's performances received critical praise. Thornton and Blanchett were nominated for Golden Globe Awards for Best Actor and Best Actress – Motion Picture Comedy or Musical at the 59th Golden Globes and Blanchett was nominated for Best Supporting Actress at the 8th Screen Actors Guild Awards. Despite this, the film underperformed at the box office, grossing $67.6 million against a $75 million budget.

== Plot ==
Two friends and convicts, Joe and Terry, break out of Oregon State Penitentiary in a concrete mixing truck and start a bank robbing spree, hoping to fund a dream they share. They become known as the "Sleepover Bandits" because of their modus operandi: they kidnap the manager of a target bank the night before a planned robbery, then spend the night with the manager's family; early the next morning, they accompany the manager to the bank to get their money. Using dim-witted would-be stunt man Harvey Pollard as their getaway driver and lookout, the three successfully pull off a series of robberies that gets them recognition on the FBI's Ten Most Wanted list, and ultimately the reward for information leading to their capture is increased to $1 million.

When Kate, a housewife with a failing marriage, decides to run away, she ends up in the hands of the criminals. Initially attracted to Joe, she also ends up in bed with Terry and a confused love triangle begins.

The three of them go on the lam and manage to pull off a few more robberies, but after a while the two begin to fight over Kate, and she decides to leave them. The two criminals then decide to pull off one last job.

The story is told in flashbacks, framed by the story of the pair's last robbery of the Alamo Bank, as told by Criminals at Large, a fictional reality television show, with which they taped an interview stating that Kate was only a hostage, not a participant. The show tells the story of their last job, which is known to be a failure when Kate tips off the police and the two are caught in the act. The two then begin to argue when Joe tells the police "You won't take us alive!" and the argument gets to the point where the two of them shoot each other dead.

At the end of the film the real story behind the last job is revealed: Harvey used some of his special effects to make it seem as though Terry and Joe were shooting each other. Dressed as paramedics, Harvey and his girlfriend Claire then run in and place the stolen money, Terry, and Joe in body bags while Kate (who was in on the plan) distracts the police by pretending to pass out in shock upon seeing the "bodies". In the ambulance, Harvey used electronics to blow out his tires which sent the ambulance into a junkyard. Under his jumpsuit, Harvey was wearing a fire suit. He set fire to himself and rigged a bomb to go off. Harvey, Claire, Terry, and Joe flee the scene, leading officials to believe that the bodies were burned beyond recognition. Kate receives the $1 million reward for having turned them in.

Reunited, Joe, Terry, Harvey, and Kate make it to Mexico to live out their dream. The last scene shows Harvey and Claire getting married in Mexico and Kate kissing Joe and Terry passionately.

== Cast ==
- Bruce Willis as Joe Blake
- Billy Bob Thornton as Terry Collins
- Cate Blanchett as Kate Wheeler
- Troy Garity as Harvey Pollard
- Brían F. O'Byrne as Darill Miller
- Stacey Travis as Cloe Miller
- Bobby Slayton as Darren Head
- January Jones as Claire
- Azura Skye as Cheri Woods
- Peggy Miley as Mildred Kronenberg
- William Converse-Roberts as Charles Wheeler
- Richard Riehle as Lawrence Fife
- Micole Mercurio as Sarah Fife
- Scott Burkholder as Wildwood Policeman
- Anthony Burch as Phil
- Sam Levinson as Billy Saunders
- Scout Willis as Monica Miller
- Tallulah Willis as Erika Miller

== Soundtrack ==
1. "Long Way Home" – J.J. Cale
2. "All the Tired Horses" – Bob Dylan
3. "Gallows Pole" – Jimmy Page & Robert Plant
4. "Tweedle Dee & Tweedle Dum" – Bob Dylan
5. "Holding Out for a Hero" (written by Jim Steinman) – Bonnie Tyler
6. "Twist in My Sobriety" – Tanita Tikaram
7. "Rudiger" – Mark Knopfler
8. "Just Another" – Pete Yorn
9. "Walk On By" – Dionne Warwick
10. "Superman (It's Not Easy)" – Five for Fighting
11. "Crazy 'Lil Mouse" – In Bloom
12. "Just the Two of Us" – Bill Withers and Grover Washington Jr.
13. "Wildfire" – Michael Martin Murphey
14. "Total Eclipse of the Heart" (written by Jim Steinman) – Bonnie Tyler
15. "Bandits Suite" – Christopher Young
16. "Beautiful Day" - U2
17. "Kill The Rock" - Mindless Self Indulgence
18. "The Chase" – Elmer Bernstein
19. "Mustang Sally" – Bonny Rice
20. "La Bikina" – Rubén Fuentes
21. "The Lion Sleeps Tonight" - Solomon Linda, Hugo Peretti, George Weiss and Luigi Creatore
22. "The Shoop Shoop Song (It's in His Kiss)" - Rudy Clark
23. "Wear It So Well" - Lucas Shine

== Production ==
Bandits was filmed at around 60 different locations in Oregon and California.

Scenes were filmed in Oregon: Broadway Bridge (Portland, Oregon), Lake Oswego, Oregon City Silverton, and Salem, and Oregon State Penitentiary.

Scenes were filmed in California: Mill Valley, San Anselmo, Tomales, and Marshall, and Santa Rosa, Sebastopol, Tomales Bay, Dillon Beach, Bodega Bay, Nick's Cove, Point Montara Lighthouse, Half Moon Bay, and Salinas.

The series of taped interview flashbacks, by Criminals at Large, a fictional reality television show, with host Darren Head (Bobby Slayton) was filmed at the Sheats–Goldstein Residence.

== Release and reception ==
=== Box office ===
In its opening weekend, the film opened at #2, behind Training Day, earning $13 million. It beat out other newcomer Corky Romano by just over four million dollars. The film grossed $67.6 million worldwide, against a budget of $75 million. Another report suggests a budget of $80 million, with domestic Box Office of $41,575,141 and overseas Box Office of $26,056,762.

=== Home media ===
Bandits was released on DVD and VHS on April 2, 2002. On March 22, 2016, the film was released on Blu-ray.

=== Critical response ===
On the review aggregator website Rotten Tomatoes, 64% of 138 critics' reviews are positive, with an average rating of 6.1/10. The website's consensus reads: "The story may not warrant its lengthy running time, but the cast of Bandits makes it an enjoyable ride." Metacritic assigned the film a weighted average score of 60 out of 100, based on 32 critics, indicating "mixed or average" reviews. Audiences polled by CinemaScore gave the film an average grade of "B" on an A+ to F scale.

Time Out wrote:

Despite a plot as old as the hills and a title that pitches for outlaw nostalgia, this is a reasonable hybrid, a character-led comic ramble along the highways and byways of genre - buddy pic, heist film, romance and road movie. Add light media satire and, with Levinson's emphasis on performance and dialogue, you have a higher-end studio project, albeit overlong and uneven, with a residue of indie spirit.

Billy Bob Thornton stole the show in this film with a wonderfully funny physical performance and fine-tuned, consistent timing.

Roger Ebert of the Chicago Sun-Times gave the movie 2 stars out of possible 4, praising the main performances but criticizing the uneven tone, writing: "It's rare for a movie to have three such likable characters and be so unlikeable itself", because "the movie doesn’t commit to any of the several directions in which it meanders."

Christopher Borelli of The Toledo Blade gave a similarly muted review, praising the cinematography but also writing: "Bruce Willis plays a walking smirk. Wait, that's unfair. He does other things too: He falls in love and gets his heart broken and dances in a tuxedo shirt under the pale blue glow of the moon."

=== Legacy ===
In 2007 in New York, five men were prosecuted and convicted for crimes imitative of this film's plot.
