= Marcel Langenegger =

Swiss film producer, director and screenwriter (1967-2015)

- Born: 2 April 1967; Rebstein, Switzerland
- Died: 10 September 2015 (aged 48); Rebstein, Switzerland
- Occupation: Film director

Marcel Langenegger (2 April 1967 – 10 September 2015) was a Swiss film director, film producer and screenwriter from Rebstein, Switzerland. His 2008 debut feature film, Deception, starred Hugh Jackman, Ewan McGregor, and Michelle Williams.

== Life and career ==
Langenegger read Art and Film at the University of Zurich. He also studied Design and Visual Arts at the Art Center College of Design in Vevey, and was part of a master's degree class at the main campus of the Art Center College of Design in Pasadena, California. Later he worked freelance as designer and art director back in Zürich before relocating in 1995 to Los Angeles. In 2000 he signed with Propaganda Films but the company collapsed when the owner was diagnosed with cancer. He signed with Warner but his contract was annulled after the merger with AOL. He could only finish his first feature film Deception by shooting all scenes with his star Hugh Jackman in a single month to accommodate Jackman's simultaneous involvement in Australia.

In 2012 he produced Jordan Roberts' 3,2,1... Frankie Go Boom, starring Charlie Hunnam, Chris O'Dowd, Lizzy Caplan, Chris Noth, Whitney Cummings, and Ron Perlman. He wrote a Samurai action-drama film, Blue Eyed Samurai, which has not yet gone into production.

== Death ==
On 10 September 2015 he died at 48 years old. No cause of death was given.

== Filmography ==
- Deception (2008) - director
- 3,2,1... Frankie Go Boom (2012) - producer
