= Who's Your Caddy? =

2007 film by Don Michael Paul

- Theatrical release poster
- Directed by: Don Michael Paul
- Written by: Don Michael Paul; Bradley Allenstein; Robert Henny
- Produced by: Christopher Eberts; Tracey Edmonds; Kia Jam; Arnold Rifkin; Chris Roberts
- Starring: Antwan Andre Patton; Jeffrey Jones; James Avery; Tony Cox; Tamala Jones; Jenifer Lewis; Andy Milonakis; Jim Piddock; Sherri Shepherd; Faizon Love
- Cinematography: Thomas L. Callaway
- Edited by: Vanick Moradian; Scott Mosier
- Music by: Jon Lee; Russ "Aaddict" Howard; Zack "Bizness" Burke; Nate & Brainz
- Production companies: Dimension Films; Our Stories Films; Cheyenne Enterprises
- Distributed by: Metro-Goldwyn-Mayer; The Weinstein Company
- Release date: July 27, 2007
- Running time: 91 minutes
- Country: United States
- Language: English
- Budget: $7 million
- Box office: $5.7 million

Who's Your Caddy? is a 2007 American comedy film directed by Don Michael Paul and starring Big Boi, Lil Wayne, Andy Milonakis, Faizon Love, Terry Crews, Tony Cox, Jeffrey Jones and Jesper Parnevik. It is the first film produced by Robert L. Johnson's Our Stories Films studio.

The film was released by Metro-Goldwyn-Mayer and The Weinstein Company on July 27, 2007. It received negative reviews and grossed $5.7 million against a $7 million budget.

== Plot ==
When hip-hop star Christopher "C-Note" Hawkins (Big Boi) is denied membership into an exclusive Carolina Pines Country Club, he comes up with a cunning plan that will oblige the country club to allow his acceptance. C-Note purchases property that contains land from the 17th hole and bribes the country club for a membership in exchange for his land. The rest of the movie's plot revolves around the club members and their efforts to get C-Note kicked out, while he disrupts the club's atmosphere.

== Cast ==
- Big Boi as Christopher "C-Note" Hawkins (credited as "Antwan André Patton")
  - Chase A.A. Jackson as Young Christopher "C-Note" Hawkins
- Jeffrey Jones as Richard Cummings
- James Avery as Mack "Caddy Mack"
- Tony Cox as Willie "Big Willie" Johnson
- Terry Crews as "Tank"
- Cam Gigandet as Mick
- Tamala Jones as Shannon Williams
- Jenifer Lewis as Mrs. Hawkins
- Andy Milonakis as Wilson Cummings
- Garrett Morris as Reverend J.J. Jackson
- Jim Piddock as Harrington
- Sherri Shepherd as "Lady G"
- Susan Ward as Mrs. Cummings
- Faizon Love as "Big Large"
- Finesse Mitchell as "Dread"
- Chase Tatum as "Kidd Clean"
- Dana Michael Woods as "Lil' Rod"
- Bruce Bruce as Eddie "Golf-Ball Eddie"
- Michael Cavanaugh as John Marshall
- Kim Morgan Greene as Brownie Woman
- Robert Curtis Brown as "Frosty"
- Lester "Rasta" Speight as Hardcote Inmate
- Lil Wayne as Himself
- David Kelly as Bobby Hawkins
- Jesper Parnevik as Himself
- Lawrence Hilton-Jacobs as Joseph Williams
- Todd Sherry as Realtor
- Matthew Reichel as Himself

== Release ==
The film was produced by Rifkin-Eberts and released by Dimension Films in association with BET’s Robert L. Johnson under its new division known as Our Stories Films. It was released in North America in distribution by Metro-Goldwyn-Mayer on July 27, 2007. It was then released on DVD by Genius Products on November 27, 2007.

== Reception ==
=== Critical reception ===
On the review aggregator website Rotten Tomatoes, 6% of 33 critics' reviews are positive, with an average rating of 2.8/10. The website's consensus reads: "A juvenile, uninspired retread of Caddyshack, Who's Your Caddy? is unoriginal, unfunny, and just plain forgettable." Metacritic, which uses a weighted average, assigned the film a score of 18 out of 100, based on 11 critics, indicating "overwhelming dislike".

The film was nominated for a Golden Raspberry award for Worst Remake or Rip-off, but lost to I Know Who Killed Me.

Former U.S. president Bill Clinton "loves" the film. In August 2016, Bradley Cooper and Todd Phillips made guest appearances on The Late Late Show with James Corden where they discussed having dinner with Clinton in Thailand while filming The Hangover Part II. The two guests stated that during their dinner with the former president, Clinton stated that he loves comedies and his favorite comedy is Who's Your Caddy?

=== Box office ===
The movie grossed US$2.76 million in its first week at the box office, debuting in the number 10 spot and performed poorly at the box office earning only $5,713,425 in total.
