= Stag Night =

STAG NIGHT
- Directed by: Peter A. Dowling
- Written by: Peter A. Dowling
- Produced by: Arnold Rifkin; Christopher Eberts; Michael Philip
- Starring: Kip Pardue; Vinessa Shaw; Breckin Meyer; Scott Adkins; Karl Geary; Sarah Barrand
- Cinematography: Toby Moore
- Edited by: Vanick Moridian
- Music by: Benedikt Brydern
- Production companies: Film Tiger; Instinctive Film; Rifkin-Eberts
- Distributed by: Arsenal Pictures; Lionsgate; Ghost House Underground
- Release date: June 26, 2008
- Running time: 84 minutes
- Country: United States
- Language: English
- Budget: $4 million

Stag night is also the UK, Canadian, Irish, Australian and New Zealand term for a Bachelor party.

Stag Night is a 2008 American horror film written and directed by Peter A. Dowling and starring Kip Pardue, Vinessa Shaw, and Breckin Meyer. The plot follows four men from a bachelor party along with two strippers who become trapped in an abandoned platform in the New York City Subway, where they witness a murder.

== Plot ==
Four men on a bachelor party in New York ride the subway and, along with two strippers from the club, accidentally get off at a station that closed down in the 1970s. Trapped in the tunnels beneath New York, they are hunted by savage cannibals and have to survive the night.

== Cast ==
- Kip Pardue as Mike
- Vinessa Shaw as Brita
- Breckin Meyer as Tony
- Scott Adkins as Carl
- Karl Geary as Joe
- Sarah Barrand as Michele
- Rachel Oliva as Claire
- Luca Bercovici as Tunnel Rat #1
- Genadii Gancheva as Tunnel Rat #2
- Radoslav Parvanov as Tunnel Rat #3
- Suzanna Urszuly as Woman
- Itai Diakov as Kid Tunnel Rat
- Nikolai Sotirov as Old Man
- Phil Jackson as Rain Driver
- Vencislav Stojanov as Cop
- Jo Marr as Young Man
- Amy Mihailova as Young Woman
- Yordan Zahariev as Bouncer #1
- Gabriel Balanica as Bouncer #2
- Maya Andreeva as Old Woman
- Dennis Andreev as Child
- Lyubomir Yonchev as Shanty Town Bo

== Production ==
Produced by Arnold Rifkin and Chris Eberts, under their Rifkin/Eberts label, and Michael Philip and Jo Marr of Film Tiger. The movie was shot in 2007 in Sofia, Bulgaria and in New York City. The post-production took place at "The Post Group", Hollywood, Los Angeles in 2008. Chris Ouwinga and Darryn Welch financed the film via their production company, Instinctive Film.

Starring Kip Pardue, Vinessa Shaw, Breckin Meyer, Karl Geary, Scott Adkins, Sarah Barrand, Rachel Oliva and Luca Bercovici.

Closing Credits Song, "Don't Hide Away From the Sun" by Alphanaut.

=== Inspiration ===
Running in almost real time, Stag Night is a throwback to the early film of John Carpenter and 1970s thrillers such as Deliverance while the plot bears a certain resemblance to that of the classic British horror film Death Line (1972).

== Release ==
The film was first time released as Direct-to-DVD on 26 June 2008 in Brazil as Fuga Sobre Trilhos. It was part of the Screamfest Horror Film Festival on 8 February 2010. Ghost House Pictures released the DVD in the United States on 15 February 2011.
