= Flightplan =

2005 film by Robert Schwentke

- Theatrical release poster
- Directed by: Robert Schwentke
- Written by: Peter A. Dowling; Billy Ray
- Produced by: Brian Grazer
- Starring: Jodie Foster; Peter Sarsgaard; Erika Christensen; Sean Bean
- Cinematography: Florian Ballhaus
- Edited by: Thom Noble
- Music by: James Horner
- Production companies: Touchstone Pictures; Imagine Entertainment
- Distributed by: Buena Vista Pictures Distribution
- Release dates: September 23, 2005 (United States); October 20, 2005 (Germany)
- Running time: 98 minutes
- Countries: United States; Germany
- Languages: English; German
- Budget: $55 million
- Box office: $223 million

Flightplan is a 2005 mystery psychological thriller film directed by Robert Schwentke from a screenplay written by Peter A. Dowling and Billy Ray. It stars Jodie Foster as Kyle Pratt, a recently widowed American aircraft engineer living in Berlin, who flies back to the United States with her daughter and her husband's body. She loses her daughter during the flight and must struggle to find her while proving her sanity at the same time. (Note: The plot's basic premise (albeit with a very different denouement) is similar to a 1955 episode of Alfred Hitchcock Presents titled "Into Thin Air", as well as Hitchcock's 1938 film The Lady Vanishes. It is also reminiscent of the 1950 British film So Long at the Fair.) It also features Peter Sarsgaard, Erika Christensen, Kate Beahan, Greta Scacchi, Sean Bean, and Matt Bomer in his film debut.

Released theatrically by Buena Vista Pictures Distribution on September 23, 2005, in the United States and on October 20, 2005, in Germany, the film received mixed reviews from critics, who praised the direction, performances of the cast (particularly Foster's), and the thriller elements of the film but criticized the screenplay. It was also a major commercial success, grossing over $223 million worldwide on a $55 million budget, and received two nominations at the 32nd Saturn Awards; Best Action or Adventure Film, and Best Actress (for Foster).

== Plot ==
Recently widowed Berlin-based American aviation engineer Kyle Pratt is taking her husband David's body back to the United States. Traveling with their six-year-old daughter Julia, they board a new double-decker aircraft Kyle helped design.

Awakening from a nap, Kyle finds Julia is gone, and no one recalls seeing her. Flight attendant Stephanie tells her there is no record of her daughter boarding the flight, and Julia's boarding pass and backpack are missing. At a panicked Kyle's insistence, Captain Marcus Rich conducts a search, while sky marshal Gene Carson monitors her. Kyle accuses two Arab passengers of stalking her daughter the night before, resulting in a fight and her being handcuffed.

Kyle reveals that her husband died in an apparent fall from the roof of a building, though she suspects it was not a suicide. Captain Rich receives a message from a Berlin hospital that Julia died with her father, and is convinced that Kyle, unhinged by her husband's and daughter's deaths, imagined bringing her on board. The increasingly erratic Kyle is confined to her seat, where a therapist, Lisa, consoles her. Kyle doubts her own sanity until she notices the heart Julia drew in the condensation on the window next to her seat.

Kyle asks to use the bathroom, where she climbs into the overhead crawl space, sabotaging the aircraft's electronics. In the ensuing chaos, she rides a dumbwaiter to the lower freight deck and unlocks David's casket, suspecting Julia to be inside, but finds only her husband's body. Carson escorts Kyle to her seat in handcuffs, and explains the flight is making an emergency stopover at Goose Bay Airport in Labrador, where she will be taken into custody.

Kyle pleads with Carson to search the hold. He sneaks down to the freight deck, removing two explosives and a detonator concealed in David's casket, and planting the explosives in the avionics section. It is revealed that Carson, Stephanie, and the Berlin mortuary director have conspired to hijack the aircraft for a $50 million ransom and frame Kyle; they abducted Julia to coerce Kyle into unlocking the casket. Carson also falsely claims to Captain Rich that Kyle is threatening to bomb the aircraft unless the ransom is wired to a bank account and a G3 aircraft is readied upon landing. He then plans to detonate the explosives, killing Julia, and leaving Kyle dead with the detonator in her hand.

Landing in Newfoundland, the airliner is surrounded by FBI agents as the passengers exit the aircraft. Kyle confronts Captain Rich, who angrily declares the ransom has been paid. Realizing that Carson is the perpetrator, she quickly assumes the role of hijacker, commanding Carson to remain aboard and the crew to disembark.

Once the plane's door closes, Kyle knocks Carson out with a fire extinguisher, handcuffs him to a rail, and takes the detonator from his pocket. He quickly regains consciousness, frees himself and pursues Kyle, who locks herself in the cockpit. She draws Carson away by throwing a binder out a hatch door to the upper level as a ruse so she can escape. After an altercation with Kyle, a guilt-ridden Stephanie flees the airliner.

Kyle finds the unconscious Julia, but Carson arrives, revealing that he murdered David to smuggle the explosives inside his casket and gagged and dumped Julia into the food bin, believing that neither the passengers nor the crew would notice. Kyle escapes with Julia into the aircraft's non-combustible hold as Carson shoots at her. She detonates the explosives, killing him and damaging the landing gear, but she and Julia emerge unscathed as everyone realizes she had been telling the truth all along.

The next morning, in the passenger waiting section of the airport, Captain Rich apologizes to a seated Kyle holding Julia in her arms as Stephanie is led away by FBI agents. One agent approaches to inform them that the Berlin mortuary director has also been arrested, adding that they are tracking down another accomplice who erased Julia's record from the flight manifest.

Kyle silently redeems herself by carrying Julia through the crowd of passengers. As one of the Arab passengers assists Kyle in loading her luggage onto a waiting van, Julia awakens and sleepily asks "Are we there yet?" as they drive away.

== Cast ==
- Jodie Foster as Kyle Pratt, a recently widowed aircraft engineer
- Peter Sarsgaard as Gene Carson, an agent of the Federal Air Marshal Service
- Sean Bean as Captain Marcus Rich, a pilot for Aalto Airlines
- Kate Beahan as Stephanie, a flight attendant for Aalto Airlines
- Michael Irby as Obaid
- Assaf Cohen as Ahmed
- Erika Christensen as Fiona
- Shane Edelman as Mr. Loud
- Mary Gallagher as Mrs. Loud
- Haley Ramm as Brittany Loud
- Forrest Landis as Rhett Loud
- Jana Kolesarova as Claudia
- Brent Sexton as Elias
- Marlene Lawston as Julia Pratt, Kyle and David's daughter
- Judith Scott as Estella
- John Benjamin Hickey as David Pratt, Kyle's deceased husband
- Matthew Bomer as Eric
- Gavin Grazer as FBI agent
- Christopher Gartin as Mike
- Kirk B. R. Woller as Grunick
- Stephanie Faracy as Anna
- Amanda Brooks as Irene
- Jesse Burch as row 19 male passenger
- Greta Scacchi as Dr. Lisa, the therapist
- Lois Hall as main deck grandma
- David Farkas as steward (uncredited)

== Production ==
=== Development ===
The film draws heavily on Alfred Hitchcock's The Lady Vanishes, in which one passenger goes missing on board a train and only the main character remembers her, especially in the scene where Kyle discovers the heart drawn by her daughter on the plane window. The similarities have led to Flightplan being called a “remake” of Hitchcock’s film. Peter A. Dowling claims having had the idea for Flightplan in 1999 on a phone conversation with a friend. His original pitch for producer Brian Grazer involved a man who worked on airport security doing a business trip from the United States to Hong Kong, and during the flight his son went missing. A few years later, Billy Ray took over the script, taking out the terrorists from the story and putting more emphasis on the protagonist, who became a female as Grazer thought it would be a good role for Jodie Foster. The story then focused on the main character regaining her psyche, and added the post-September 11 attacks tension and paranoia. There was also an attempt to hide the identity of the villain by showcasing the different characters on the plane. Both Dowling and Ray were allowed to visit the insides of a Boeing 747 at the Los Angeles International Airport to develop the limited space set for the story.

=== Casting ===
Robert Schwentke said that to make Flightplan as realistic as possible, he wanted naturalistic, subdued performances. One example was Peter Sarsgaard, whom he described as an actor "who can all of a sudden become a snake uncoiling". First-time actress Marlene Lawston was cast as Foster's character's daughter Julia. Sean Bean was cast to subvert his typecasting as a villain and mislead audiences into thinking he was part of the villainous plot. Schwentke also picked each of the 300 passengers through auditions.

=== Filming ===
Schwentke described Flightplan as a "slow boiling" thriller, where the opening is different from the faster ending parts. The director added that sound was used to put audiences "off-kilter".

The art direction team had to build all the interiors and the cockpit of the fictional Elgin E-474 from scratch, basing both the interior design and layout on the Airbus A380, with its aircraft's classification number similar to the 747. The amount of dead space within the cabin, cargo and avionic areas of the E-474 did not reflect the actual amount of dead space within any aircraft. BE Aerospace provided various objects to "stage the scene"; "many of the interior sets used real aircraft components such as seats and galleys."

To allow for varied camera angles, the set had many tracks for the camera dolly to move, and both the walls and the ceiling were built on hinges so they could easily be swung open for shooting. The design and colors tried to invoke the mood for each scene. For instance, a white room for "eerie, clinical, cold" moments, lower ceilings for claustrophobia, and wide open spaces to give no clues to the audience. Most exterior scenes of the E-474 involve a model one-tenth of the aircraft's actual size, with the images being subsequently enhanced through computer-generated imagery. The explosion in the nose involved both life sized and scaled pieces of scenery. A one-half scale set of the avionics area was constructed to make the explosion and fireball look bigger.

=== Music ===
The score for Flightplan was released September 20, 2005, on Hollywood Records. The music was composed and conducted by James Horner and performed by the Hollywood Studio Symphony, and the disc contains eight tracks. Horner stated that film's score tried to mix the sound effects with "the emotion and drive of the music", and the instruments were picked to match the "feelings of panic" Kyle goes through. These included Gamelan instruments, prepared piano, and string arrangements. No brass instruments are used in the soundtrack.

== Reception ==
=== Box office ===
Flightplan opened at number one at the US and Canadian box office, grossing $24.6 million in its opening weekend. It grossed $89.7 million in the United States and Canada, and $133.7 million in other territories, for a worldwide total of $223.4 million. In the week ending October 23, 2005, it opened at number one in Germany with an opening weekend gross of $3.8 million as well as opening at number one in seven other countries including Brazil and Sweden. It also grossed $79,270,000 on DVD rentals.

=== Critical response ===
On Rotten Tomatoes the film has an approval rating of 37% based on 175 reviews, with an average rating of 5.3/10. The site's critics consensus states: "The actors are all on key here, but as the movie progresses, tension deflates as the far-fetched plot kicks in." On Metacritic, it has a weighted average score of 53 out of 100 rating, based on 33 critics, indicating "mixed or average" reviews. Audiences surveyed by CinemaScore gave the film an average grade B+ on an A+ to F scale.

Film historian Leonard Maltin in Leonard Maltin's 2012 Movie Guide (2011) described Flightplan as "suspenseful at first, this thriller becomes remote and un-involving; by the climax, it's just plain ridiculous."

Roger Ebert gave it 3 and a half out of 4 stars, praising its "airtight plot" and the acting performances. Other reviewers including The Christian Science Monitor criticised "plotholes the size of an Airbus in the script".

Aviation film historian Simon D. Beck in The Aircraft-Spotter's Film and Television Companion (2016) noted that Flightplan was careful in setting the scene. "The aircraft is a fictional mammoth airliner called the 'E-474', a double-deck jumbo modeled strongly after the Airbus A-380, the large size being suitable for the missing-person plot of the film."

== Controversy ==
The Association of Professional Flight Attendants called for an official boycott of the film, which they said depicts flight attendants as rude and unsympathetic towards a distressed passenger; the flight attendants and the pilot viewed Foster's character as delusional and barely attempted to help her, in addition to one flight attendant revealed to be an accomplice to terrorists (as part of a strategy to extort a ransom from the airline). As such, the group postulated that the film could spread distrust of their members among airline passengers.

Tommie Hutto-Blake, president of the Association of Professional Flight Attendants, stated, "Should there be another 9/11, it would be critical for the cabin crew to have the support of their passengers, not the distrust that this movie may engender... Our fellow crew members who perished in the line of duty deserve more respect". Two other trade organizations, the Association of Flight Attendants and Transport Workers Union Local 556, also called for a boycott.

== See also ==
- Red Eye, another 2005 psychological thriller taking place during a flight
- The Forgotten (2004)

== Bibliography ==
- Beck, Simon D. The Aircraft-Spotter's Film and Television Companion. Jefferson, North Carolina: McFarland and Company, 2016. ISBN 978-1-4766-2293-4.
- Maltin, Leonard. Leonard Maltin's 2012 Movie Guide. New York: Plume Books, 2011. ISBN 978-0-452-29735-7.
