= Deception (2008 film) =

- Theatrical release poster
- Directed by: Marcel Langenegger
- Written by: Mark Bomback
- Produced by: Arnold Rifkin; John Palermo; Hugh Jackman; Robbie Brenner; David Bushell; Christopher Eberts
- Starring: Hugh Jackman; Ewan McGregor; Michelle Williams
- Cinematography: Dante Spinotti
- Edited by: Douglas Crise; Christian Wagner
- Music by: Ramin Djawadi
- Production companies: Dune Entertainment; Media Rights Capital; Seed Productions; Rifkin/Eberts
- Distributed by: 20th Century Fox (United States, Australia and New Zealand); Summit Entertainment (International)
- Release date: April 25, 2008
- Running time: 108 minutes
- Country: United States
- Language: English
- Budget: $25 million
- Box office: $17 million

Deception is a 2008 American erotic thriller film directed by Marcel Langenegger and written by Mark Bomback. It stars Hugh Jackman, Ewan McGregor, and Michelle Williams. The film was released on April 25, 2008, in the United States.

== Plot ==
Timid Jonathan McQuarry is an accountant in Manhattan. Late one night, while working on an audit at a law firm, he is befriended by a charismatic lawyer, Wyatt Bose. Taking the subway home, Jonathan has a brief encounter with a blonde woman. Reaching home, he notices a pipe in his bedroom is leaking and leaving a stain.

Jonathan and Wyatt become good friends. Wyatt has business in London for the next few weeks, but accidentally switches cell phones with Jonathan. Jonathan receives a call on Wyatt's phone, from a woman who asks if he is free that night. He agrees to meet her at a hotel bar. When she arrives, they proceed directly to a hotel room and have sex. In the morning, Jonathan realizes that Wyatt must be in an exclusive sex club.

When Wyatt calls the next day, he encourages Jonathan to continue in the club. One encounter is with an older woman, who explains the rules: the initiator pays for the room, no names are exchanged, there is no rough play. Over the next few weeks, he has anonymous sex with several women.

Jonathan is surprised one evening to find that his latest encounter is the blonde woman from the subway. Instead of having sex, they order room service and talk for hours. Jonathan assumes that her name begins with an "S" because of her S-shaped keychain.

Jonathan rejects other callers, responding only when he gets a new call from S. They again spend hours together before going to a hotel room. Jonathan returns from getting ice to find that S is missing, with blood on the bedsheets. Someone knocks him out, and when he wakes up, the room is in order. He calls the police, but his story makes the detective think that he is delusional. Jonathan looks for Wyatt, but his law firm does not know him and a woman is living in what Jonathan thought was Wyatt's apartment.

Jonathan is surprised to find Wyatt waiting in his apartment. Wyatt is holding S somewhere, and will kill her unless Jonathan steals $20 million from an investment firm he will be auditing. He must wire the funds, in Jonathan's name, to a bank in Spain.

Jonathan receives a voice mail on Wyatt's phone from Tina, who seems to know Wyatt personally. Jonathan goes to her hotel room, where she reveals that Wyatt's real name is Jamie Getz, and that they met at a party hosted by the wealthy Rudolph Holloway. Jonathan researches Getz, learning that he is wanted for murdering Holloway.

The day after, Jonathan receives a call from inspector Russo, who informs him that a woman named Simone Wilkinson has been found dead on the rear seat of her car, with her throat cut. Jonathan recognises one of the women he had previously sex with, but lies to inspector Russo about having ever met her. Inspector Russo also mentions that Kevlar fibers have been found in the cut, hinting that Wyatt has deliberately used Jonathan's racket material as murder weapon to frame him.

At the audit, Jonathan executes the wire transfer. Wyatt texts a picture of S tied up in Jonathan's apartment, wishing them well. Arriving at his apartment, Jonathan notices that the picture was taken before the pipe started leaking. He realizes that S is Wyatt's accomplice. His apartment then explodes, witnessed by Wyatt from across the street.

Wyatt, travelling on a passport in Jonathan's name, meets S in a hotel in Madrid. She is upset that Jonathan is dead, but he reminds her that her $1 million share is more than she ever made as a prostitute on the street. When he attempts to withdraw the funds, he learns that the co-signer, Wyatt Bose, must be present. Wyatt exits the bank to find S gone and Jonathan waiting – the apartment superintendent died in the explosion, entering the suite before Jonathan arrived. Jonathan has procured a passport using Wyatt's name. He demands half of the $20 million.

Leaving the bank, Jonathan offers Wyatt $5 million to tell him where S is. Wyatt agrees, then leads Jonathan to a quiet park and pulls a gun. Before he can shoot, Wyatt is shot by S. Jonathan pursues her, leaving a dead Wyatt and all the money behind. She apologizes to him and leaves in a cab, in tears.

Jonathan stays in Madrid. One day, he and S spot each other across a plaza; they exchange smiles, and he goes to her.

=== Alternate ending ===
Wyatt and Jonathan part ways with their shares of the money. Days later, Jonathan is walking around Madrid as he continues his futile search for S.

== Cast ==
- Hugh Jackman as Wyatt Bose
- Ewan McGregor as Jonathan McQuarry
- Michelle Williams as S
- Charlotte Rampling as Wall Street Belle (Jonathan's "older" encounter)
- Lisa Gay Hamilton as Detective Russo
- Maggie Q as Tina
- Natasha Henstridge as Wall Street Analyst (Jonathan's first encounter)
- Lynn Cohen as Woman (actual resident of Wyatt's apartment)
- Danny Burstein as Clute Controller (at Jonathan's last audit)
- Malcolm Goodwin as Cabbie

== Production ==
In October 2006, it was announced Hugh Jackman, Ewan McGregor and Michelle Williams would star in the erotic thriller The Tourist. The movie was put into turnaround by 20th Century Fox because of its racy storyline, and was financed independently. Funding was then arranged by MRC, the film financing arm of Endeavor, where Jackman was a client at the time.

== Home media ==
- Deception was released on Blu-Ray disc & DVD Tuesday, September 23, 2008, including deleted scenes, an alternate ending and some exposed behind-the-scenes footage.

== Reception ==
=== Critical reception ===
The film received substantially negative reviews from critics. Review aggregator site Rotten Tomatoes reported that 10% of critics gave the film positive reviews, based on 98 reviews – with the consensus that the film is "a middling, predictable potboiler with mediocre dialogue and ludicrous plot twists." Metacritic reported the film had an average score of 31 out of 100, based on 23 reviews. Audiences surveyed by CinemaScore gave the film a grade "C−" on scale of A to F.

=== Box office ===
In its opening weekend, the film grossed $2.3 million in 2,001 theaters in the United States and Canada, averaging only $1,155 per theater and ranking #10 at the box office. As of September 22, 2009, the film has grossed $4,598,506 in the United States and Canada while grossing $13,114,439 in foreign countries adding to a total of $17,712,945.
