= Doug Richardson =

American screenwriter and novelist

Doug Richardson is an American screenwriter and novelist who writes action movies and thrillers. He is best known for writing movies like Die Hard 2, Bad Boys and Hostage and was the first Hollywood writer to sell a spec script for a million dollars.

== Career ==
Richardson's first major Hollywood project was writing Die Hard 2, a commission he received from Larry Gordon just three weeks into the theatrical run of the original Die Hard film. He went on to write Bad Boys, adapting it from an existing screenplay by George Gallo. The film was directed by Michael Bay, and became a first film starring Martin Lawrence and Will Smith.

== Filmography ==
- Die Hard 2 (1990) (Screenplay)
- Money Train (1995) (Screenplay)
- Bad Boys (1995) (Screenplay)
- Welcome to Mooseport (2004) (Story/Executive Producer)
- Hostage (2005) (Screenplay)
- Live Free or Die Hard (2007) (Re-write).
- Black Water Transit (2009, unreleased) (Initial draft).

== Novels ==
- Dark Horse (1997)
- True Believers (1999)
- The Safety Expert (2011)
- Blood Money (2013)
- 99 Percent Kill: A Lucky Dey Thriller (2015)
- Reaper: A Lucky Dey Thriller (2016)
- American Bang: A Lucky Dey Thriller (2017)
- The Night is Never Black: A Lucky Dey Thriller (2018)

== Nonfiction ==
- The Smoking Gun: True Tales from Hollywood's Screenwriting Trenches (2015)
