= David Burke (author) =

American linguist

David Burke is the author/creator of over 100 products and books on how to use and understand slang and idioms in different languages.
