= Sacrifice (2016 film) =

- Film poster
- Directed by: Peter A. Dowling
- Written by: Peter A. Dowling; Sharon Bolton
- Produced by: Josef Brandmaier; Gertjan Rooijakkers; Margrit Staerk; Lawrence Steven Meyers; Anne Tweedy; Robert Cullen
- Starring: Radha Mitchell; Rupert Graves
- Cinematography: Dave Grennan
- Edited by: Philip Cullen
- Music by: Benedikt Brydern
- Distributed by: IFC Midnight
- Release date: April 29, 2016
- Running time: 91 minutes
- Country: United States
- Language: English

Sacrifice is a 2016 American thriller film that was written and directed by Peter A. Dowling, and starred Radha Mitchell and Rupert Graves. It was filmed in Ireland, in Shetland in the United Kingdom, and New York City. The film is based on the book Sacrifice by Sharon Bolton.

== Plot ==
Tora Hamilton (Radha Mitchell) is an obstetrician who moves together with her husband, Duncan (Rupert Graves), to the remote Shetland Islands, 100 miles off the northeast coast of Scotland. Deep within the soil around her new house, Tora finds the body of a girl with runes carved into her skin and a gaping hole in her chest where her heart once was. Ignoring warnings to leave the body alone, Tora uncovers frightening connections to an ancient legend.

With her expertise as a physician, she recognises that the murdered woman gave birth to a child and that she was murdered less than three years ago, as the body would otherwise have decomposed due to flooding. Using an X-ray of the jaw, she is able to identify the victim as the wife of the head of adoptions, who allegedly died of cancer. She is helped by the six-week pregnant policewoman Dana Tulloch, who is presumed dead in a car chase.

Over the course of the film, Tora discovers an ancient secret: The men on the island believe themselves to be "Kunal-Trows", a race of superhuman men who abduct women to serve as breeders, only to murder the women nine days after giving birth. This cult has survived and her husband's family is also part of the cult. Her husband therefore injected himself with a contraceptive to prevent his wife from also being sacrificed after a pregnancy. Instead, he wants to sacrifice Dana Tulloch, who survived and was captured, and adopt her baby.

Tora frees Dana from captivity and is supported by her husband, who turns against the members of the cult and whose father dies in the end.

== Cast ==
- Radha Mitchell as Dr. Tora Hamilton
- Rupert Graves as Duncan Guthrie
- Ian McElhinney as D.I. McKie
- David Robb as Richard Guthrie
- Liam Carney as Mr. Grey
- Joanne Crawford as Sgt. Dana Tulloch
- Peter Vollebregt as Kenn Wickliff
- Conor Mullen as Dr. Stephen Renney
- Lewis Tan as Ben Kittman

== Production ==
Filming locations included Harristown House, County Kildare, Ireland (internal décor and furnishings).

== Reviews ==
According to Neurotic Monkey of Tiny Mix Tapes, "Sacrifice isn’t a bad film, it’s just not a good one. It lacks the twists and turns needed to really sell the ideas at play, which is a shame as there is certainly a good idea for a movie in there. Perhaps if it had been shot with more flair, or had something else to highlight besides the plodding plot, it could be redeemed."
