= Low Isles, Queensland =

Low Isles
- Suburb
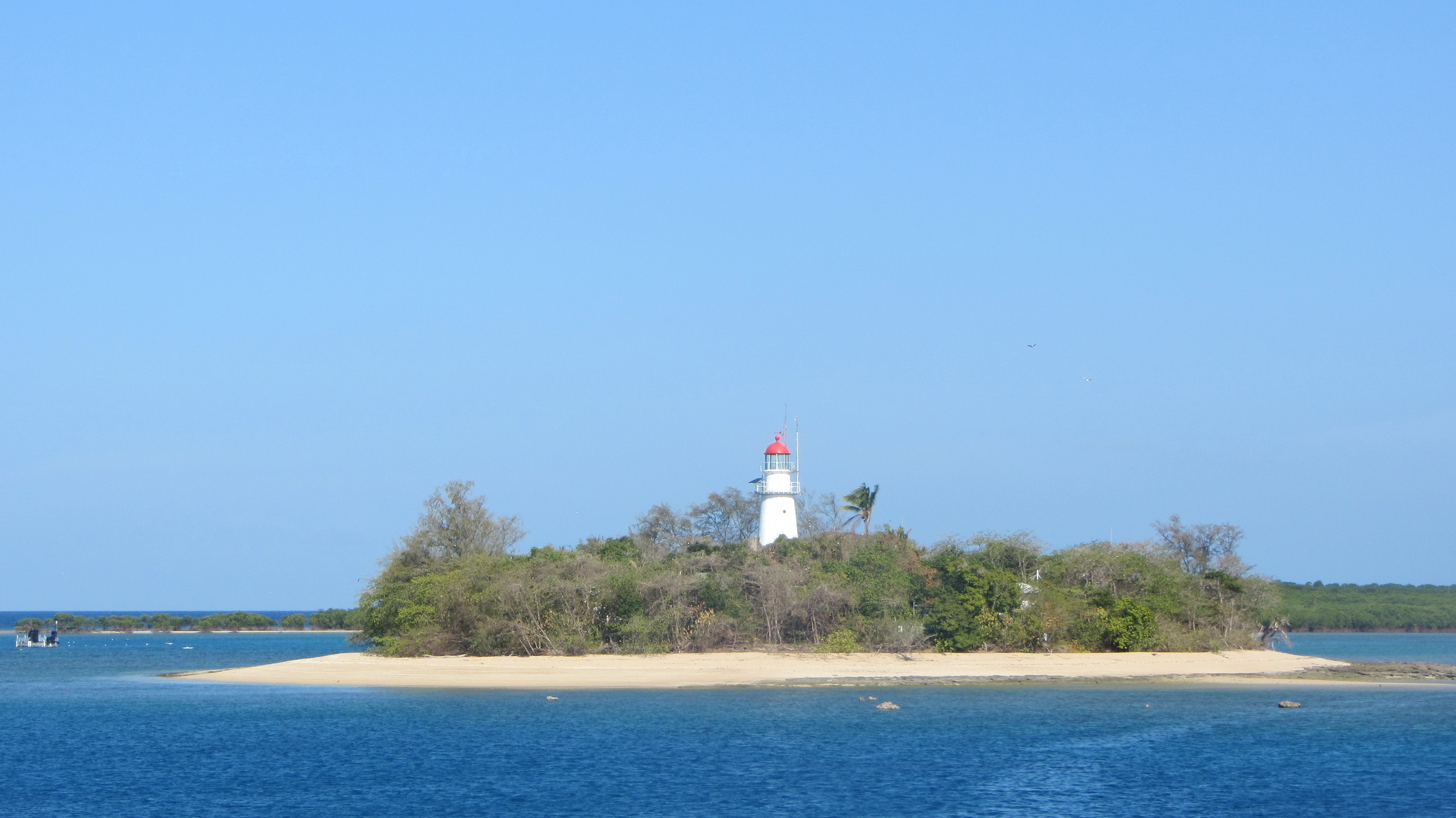
- Low Island with the lighthouse with Woody Island beyond, 2013

- Interactive map of Low Isles
- Coordinates: 16.3888°S 145.5633°E
- Country: Australia
- State: Queensland
- LGA: Shire of Douglas

Government
  - State electorate: Cook

Area
  - Total: 2.0 km^{2} (0.77 sq mi)

Population
  - Total: 0 (2021 census)
  - Density: 0.00/km^{2} (0.0/sq mi)
- Time zone: UTC+10:00 (AEST)
- Postcode: 4873
- Mean max temp: 29.4 °C (84.9 °F)
- Mean min temp: 23.4 °C (74.1 °F)
- Annual rainfall: 2,100.7 mm (82.70 in)
Suburbs around Low Isles
Coral Sea	Coral Sea	Coral Sea
Coral Sea	Low Isles	Coral Sea
Coral Sea	Coral Sea	Coral Sea

Low Isles is an offshore locality in the Shire of Douglas, Queensland, Australia. Located in the Coral Sea, the islands are due east of Rocky Point and approximately 14.5 kilometres (9.0 mi) north-east of Port Douglas on the Queensland mainland coast. In the 2021 census, Low Isles had "no people or a very low population".

== Geography ==
The locality consists of a pair of islands:

- the smaller Low Island (16.3841°S 145.5600°E)
- the larger Woody Island (16.3885°S 145.5685°E)

with the Low Islands Reef between them.

The islands are due east of Rocky Point and approximately 14.5 kilometres (9.0 mi) north-east of Port Douglas on the Queensland mainland coast.

== Climate ==
The Low Isles have a tropical monsoon (Köppen: Am, with sultry, very rainy summers and very warm, relatively dry winters.

Climate data for Low Isles Lighthouse (16º23'S, 145º33'E, 3 m AMSL) (1967-2024 normals and extremes, rainfall 1887-2024)
Month	Jan	Feb	Mar	Apr	May	Jun	Jul	Aug	Sep	Oct	Nov	Dec	Year
Record high °C (°F)	38.6 (101.5)	38.8 (101.8)	37.7 (99.9)	35.8 (96.4)	31.9 (89.4)	32.0 (89.6)	30.0 (86.0)	32.7 (90.9)	33.2 (91.8)	35.7 (96.3)	38.9 (102.0)	38.7 (101.7)	38.9 (102.0)
Mean daily maximum °C (°F)	32.2 (90.0)	31.8 (89.2)	30.8 (87.4)	29.4 (84.9)	27.5 (81.5)	25.9 (78.6)	25.4 (77.7)	26.6 (79.9)	28.6 (83.5)	30.4 (86.7)	31.8 (89.2)	32.4 (90.3)	29.4 (84.9)
Mean daily minimum °C (°F)	25.6 (78.1)	25.5 (77.9)	25.2 (77.4)	24.2 (75.6)	22.9 (73.2)	21.3 (70.3)	20.5 (68.9)	20.8 (69.4)	21.9 (71.4)	23.3 (73.9)	24.6 (76.3)	25.4 (77.7)	23.4 (74.2)
Record low °C (°F)	21.3 (70.3)	20.7 (69.3)	21.6 (70.9)	20.8 (69.4)	17.6 (63.7)	15.0 (59.0)	15.1 (59.2)	15.9 (60.6)	16.7 (62.1)	19.6 (67.3)	20.1 (68.2)	21.1 (70.0)	15.0 (59.0)
Average precipitation mm (inches)	402.4 (15.84)	414.1 (16.30)	435.5 (17.15)	229.3 (9.03)	98.4 (3.87)	61.8 (2.43)	36.8 (1.45)	36.7 (1.44)	36.3 (1.43)	46.0 (1.81)	86.5 (3.41)	210.7 (8.30)	2,100.7 (82.70)
Average precipitation days (≥ 1.0 mm)	15.5	15.9	16.8	14.9	11.3	7.6	5.9	6.1	5.6	5.1	6.9	10.9	122.5
Average afternoon relative humidity (%)	71	74	74	74	74	71	70	67	63	63	64	67	69
Average dew point °C (°F)	24.6 (76.3)	25.0 (77.0)	24.2 (75.6)	23.0 (73.4)	21.3 (70.3)	19.2 (66.6)	18.4 (65.1)	18.5 (65.3)	19.4 (66.9)	20.9 (69.6)	22.5 (72.5)	23.9 (75.0)	21.7 (71.1)
Source: Bureau of Meteorology

== History ==
The name comes from Lieutenant James Cook of HMS Endeavour, who wrote in his log on 10 June 1770, "...we hauld off north to get without a small, low island...".

The Low Isles Light station was established in 1874 with the first permanent lighthouse completed in 1878, it was the first lighthouse in Far North Queensland and the first to light the Inner Passage of the Great Barrier Reef.

In 1954, a scientific expedition to Low Isles to monitor water quality was organised by the Geology Department, University of Queensland and led by Dr Fred Whitehouse.

Staff operating the lighthouse lived on the island until it was upgraded to use solar power in 1993, after which it operated automatically.

On 4 September 2006, Steve Irwin was killed by a stingray on Batt Reef to the east of Low Isles. He was rushed to Low Island where he was pronounced dead.

== Demographics ==
In the 2016 census, Low Isles had "no people or a very low population".

In the 2021 census, Low Isles had "no people or a very low population".

== Heritage listings ==
The Low Island Lighthouse (16.3841°S 145.5598°E) is listed on the Commonwealth Heritage List.

== Education ==
There are no schools on the islands. Distance education and boarding school would be options.

== Attractions ==
The islands are popular for snorkelling over the reef to see coral, fish and sea turtles. Birdwatching is popular on Woody Island where white heron and migrating species are seen.

Low Island has the Low Isles Lighthouse and a museum.
