= Sheraton Grand Mirage Resort, Port Douglas =

Hotel in Port Douglas, Far North Queensland, Australia

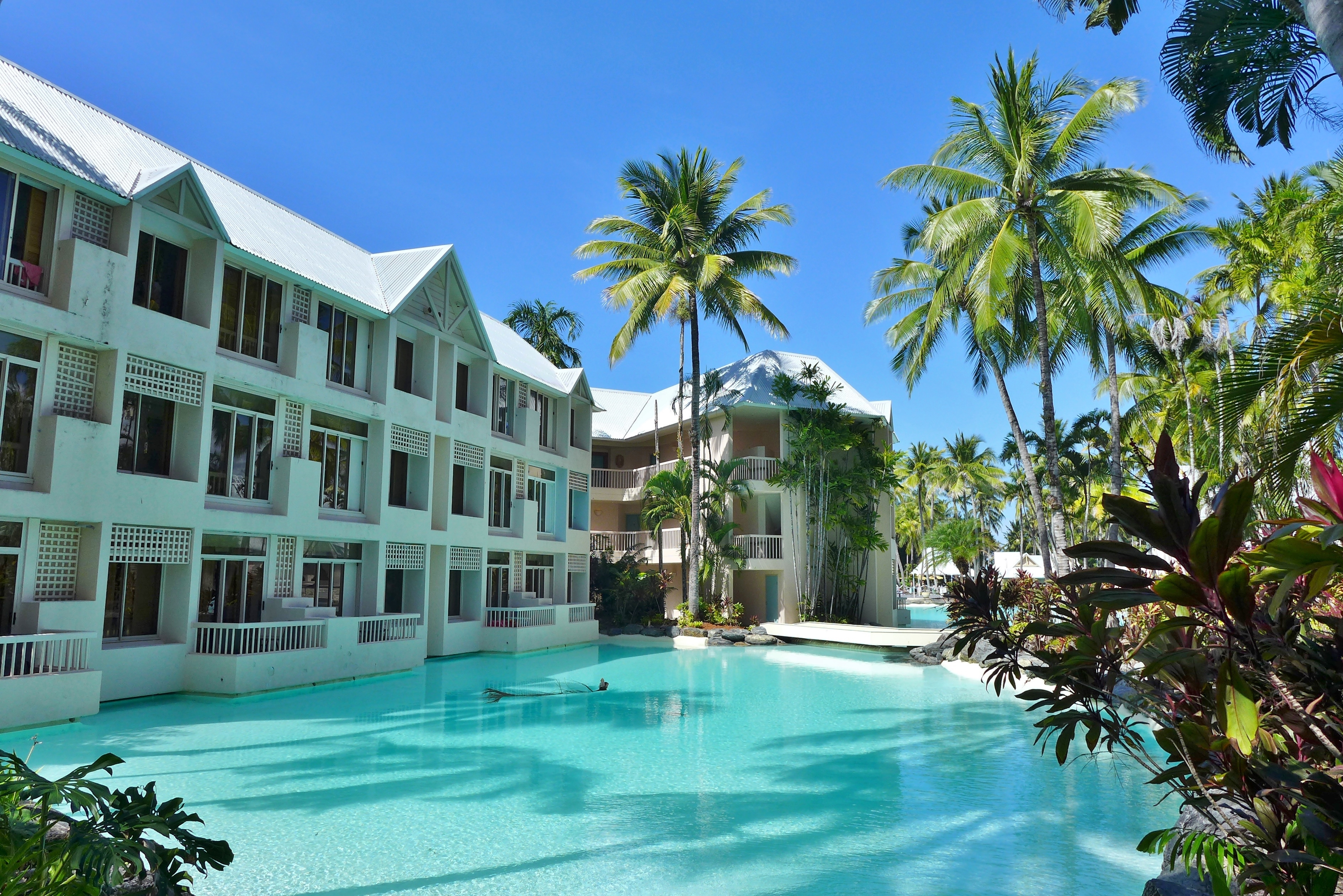

General information
- Type: Hotel and resort
- Location: Port Douglas, Far North Queensland, Australia
- Coordinates: 16.501669°S 145.465614°E
- Opened: October 1987
- Cost: $100 million
- Owner: Fullshare Group

Design and construction
- Developer: Christopher Skase

Other information
- Number of rooms: 294

Website
- Sheraton Grand Mirage Resort, Port Douglas

The Sheraton Grand Mirage Resort, Port Douglas, is a seaside resort hotel on Four Mile Beach in Port Douglas, Far North Queensland, Australia.

== History ==
Developed by businessman Christopher Skase at a reported cost of $100 million, the resort was officially opened in October 1987, and has been said to have transformed Port Douglas "from a sleepy far-north Queensland seaside town into a sophisticated tropical playground for the rich and famous."

Guests known to have stayed at the resort include former President of the United States Bill Clinton and his wife, former United States Secretary of State Hillary Clinton, Hollywood stars Kate Hudson, Matthew McConaughey, Leonardo DiCaprio, Tom Hanks and John Travolta, opera singer Luciano Pavarotti, supermodel Claudia Schiffer, and rock singer Mick Jagger and his ex-wife, model Jerry Hall.

In 2004, the resort began a major refurbishment program, and in 2011 it was purchased by Melbourne property developer David Marriner and Chinese investor the Fullshare Group for $35 million. In 2013, Marriner sold his shareholding to the Fullshare Group.

Another major redevelopment commenced in May 2015. It had a budget of $43 million and was completed in August 2016.

== Description ==
The resort's 147 ha (360 acres) site is adjacent to Four Mile Beach, Port Douglas. At its core is a group of multistorey buildings flanked by a "sprawling network" of 10 "lagoons". The site also includes tennis courts, an 18-hole golf course, the Kaia day spa and a gymnasium.

Typically the resort hosts about 700 guests, and at peak times around 900. Onsite dining is headed up by the restaurant Harrisons, which is operated by chef-owner Spencer Patrick. Opened in central Port Douglas in 2007, it relocated to the resort in 2017.
