= Woody Island (Queensland) =

Island in Queensland

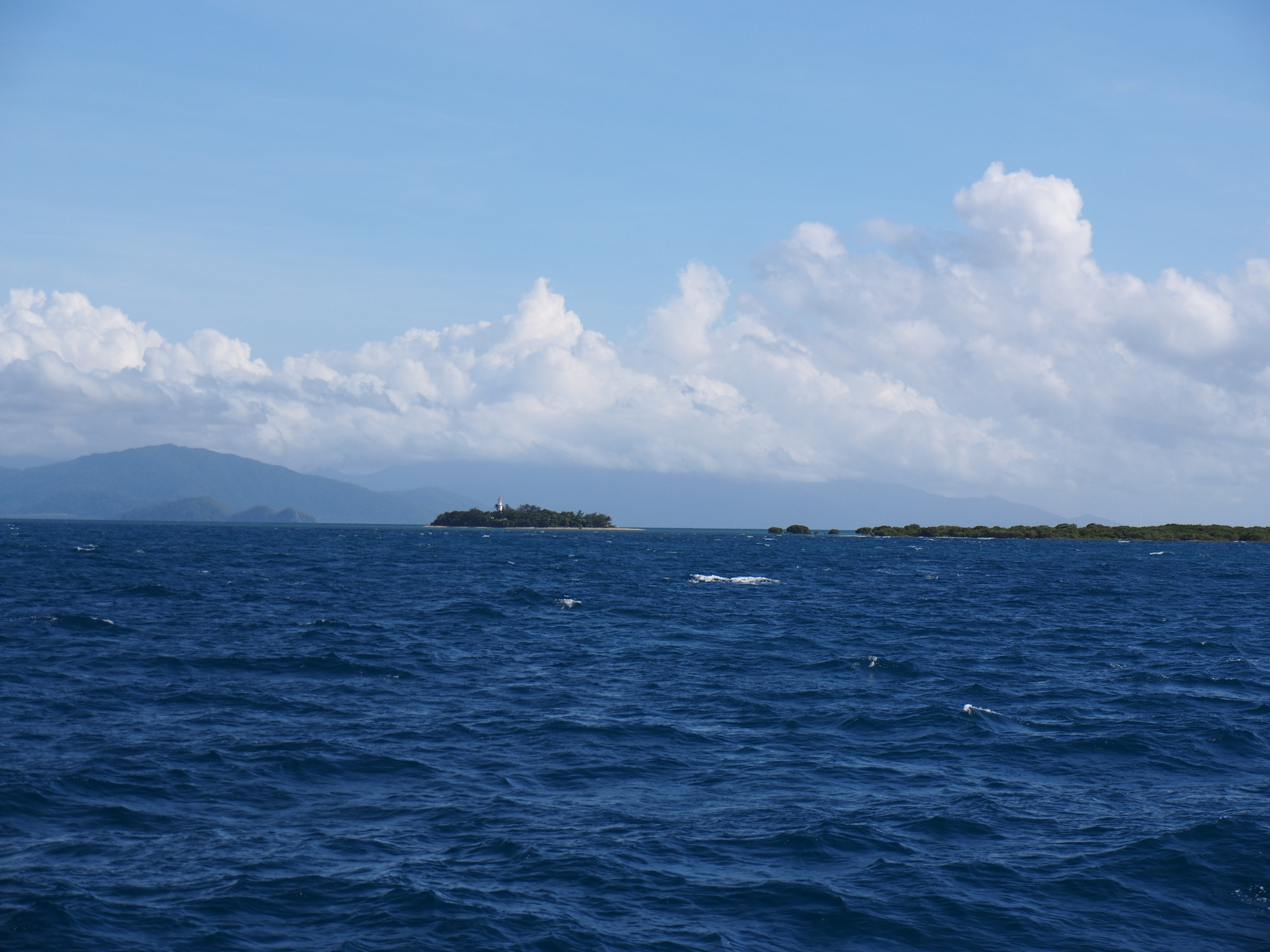
- Interactive map of Woody Island

Geography
- Location: Far North Queensland
- Coordinates: 16.388°S 145.569°E
- Area: 6.2 km^{2} (2.4 sq mi)

Administration
- Australia
- State: Queensland

Woody Island is about 25 km (16 mi) northeast of Port Douglas in Trinity Bay, Far North Queensland, Australia.

With the neighbouring Low Island, it comprises the Low Isles. Woody Island is an uninhabited coral/mangrove island, but the main attraction is Low Isle, a typical tropical island with vegetation and a sandy, coral cay surrounded by 55 acres (220,000 m^{2}) of reef.

The Low Isles are a Marine National Park Zone. Day visitors come to the island via a number of commercial operators. There is a lagoon where private vessels can moor or anchor (outside the reef protection markers) overnight, but there is no overnight accommodation on the island. There is a weather station and a lighthouse. Caretakers are permanently on Low Island and monitor both islands.

No fishing is allowed in the lagoon or within a buffer zone around the islands; the main activity is snorkeling as the coral is excellent. No motorised water sports are permitted in the locality. Fires, including BBQs and dogs are not permitted on either island.
