= St Mary's by the Sea, Port Douglas =

St Mary's by the Sea
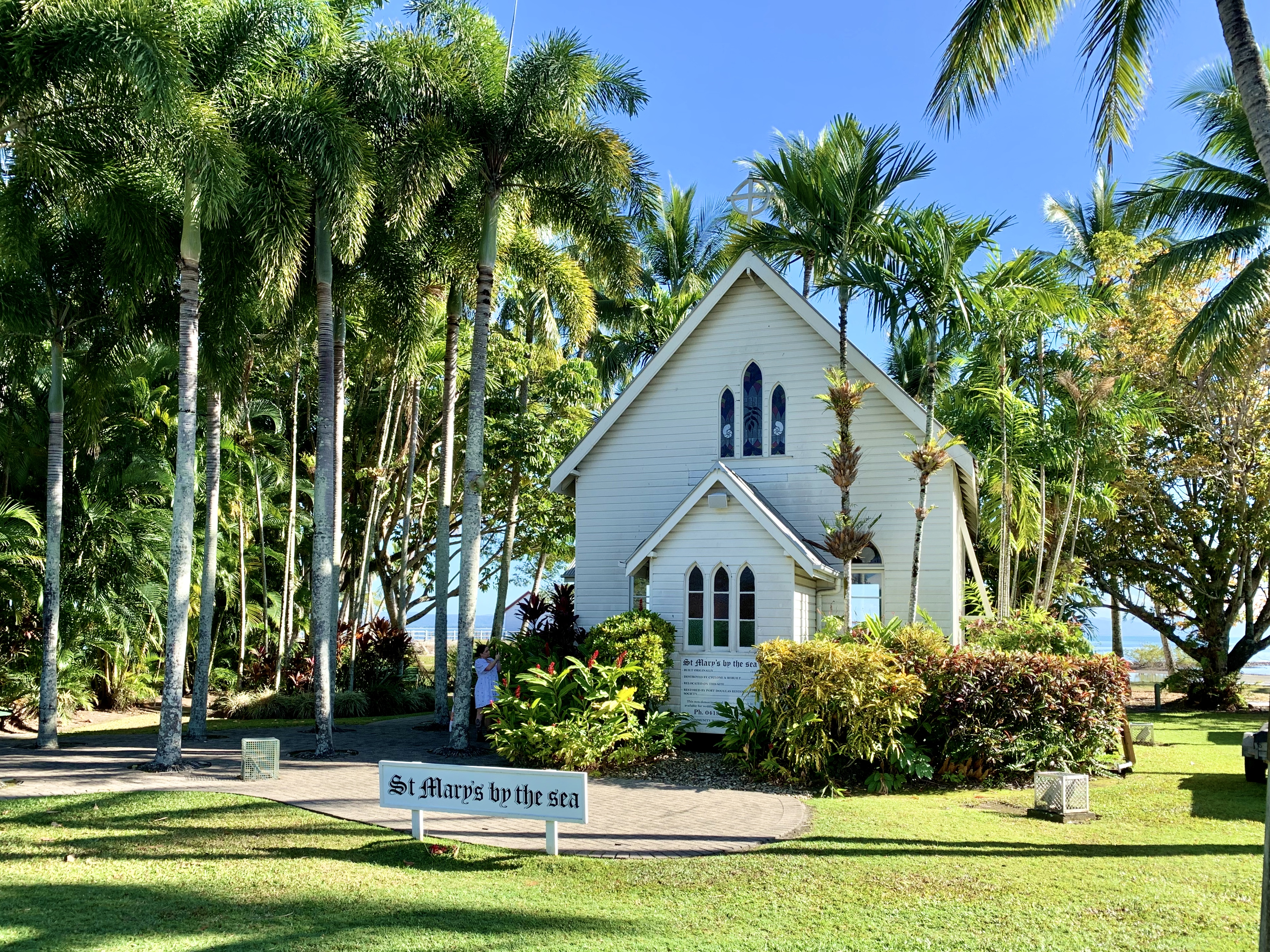
- St Mary's by the Sea, 2020
- St Mary's by the Sea
- 16°28′46″S 145°27′44″E
- Address: Wharf Street, Port Douglas, Shire of Douglas, Queensland
- Country: Australia
- Denomination: Non-denominational (since 1988)
- Previous denomination: Roman Catholic (1914–1988)

History
- Former name: St Mary's Roman Catholic Church
- Status: Church

Architecture
- Architectural type: Church
- Style: Gothic Revival
- Years built: 1913–1914

Queensland Heritage Register
- Official name: St Mary's by the Sea, St Mary's Roman Catholic Church (former)
- Type: State heritage (built)
- Designated: 21 October 1992
- Reference no.: 600464
- Significant period: 1913–1914 (construction); 1900–1914 (historical)

St Mary's by the Sea is a heritage-listed non-denominational church (formerly a Roman Catholic church) at Wharf Street, Port Douglas, Shire of Douglas, Queensland, Australia. It was built from 1913 to 1914. It is also known as the former St Mary's Roman Catholic Church. It was added to the Queensland Heritage Register on 21 October 1992.

== History ==
St Mary's by the Sea was constructed in 1914 replacing an earlier Roman Catholic church at Port Douglas, which had been destroyed by the cyclone of March 1911.

Port Douglas was established in 1877 as a port to service the newly opened Hodgkinson goldfield, west of the Great Dividing Range. In the period 1877 to 1893 Port Douglas functioned primarily as a port for the mining hinterland and secondarily as an administrative and service centre for the surrounding developing agricultural districts.

The Roman Catholic Vicariate Apostolic of North Queensland (renamed the Vicariate Apostolic of Cooktown in 1887) was established in 1877 and first staffed largely by Italians. The intention was to send missionaries among the Aborigines. However, when the first priests arrived they were required to serve the needs of new towns, the mining boom having brought into the area many Europeans, including large numbers of Irish Catholics. In 1884 the Irish Province of the Order of Saint Augustine agreed to take on the work of the Vicariate which was struggling to serve a scattered population of Catholics in a vast area with very few priests. The first chapel in Port Douglas was established in 1878 and by November 1881 a church had been erected under the direction of Father Pierre-Marie (Peter) Bucas, a Breton, on land on Port Hill. When Bishop Hutchinson arrived in 1884, an Italian priest, Father Guerrini, had been in Port Douglas for eight months and stayed on until an Augustinian arrived to replace him in May 1885.

The development of Port Douglas initially outpaced that of its nearby rival, Cairns, established in 1876. However, following the 1885 political decision to site the terminus for the Atherton Tableland railway at Cairns, it advanced rapidly at the expense of Port Douglas. After the opening of the Cairns-to-Mareeba railway in 1893, trade between Port Douglas and the mining hinterland declined markedly, and virtually ceased after the extension of the railway to Mount Molloy in 1908. Much of what remained of the town was destroyed when a severe cyclone levelled it on 16 March 1911. According to the local newspaper, itself put temporarily out of action, the church and presbytery were "blown to bits". The presbytery was rebuilt first and Mass was celebrated there until the church was complete in 1914.

Port Douglas recovered from the cyclone and although it had lost the mining trade, it operated principally as a sugar port from the 1890s until 1958. The town was also the administrative centre of the Douglas Shire until the 1920s when its headquarters were shifted to Mossman in the heart of the expanding sugar lands. In 1917 the Parish Priest of Mareeba was also appointed as the Administrator of Port Douglas. The priest appointed next (in 1932) became the first to reside in Mossman. Two years later the name of the parish was changed to Mossman and Port Douglas.

During the 1960s and 1970s Port Douglas functioned mainly as a fishing and holiday town, retaining much of its historic character, but in the 1980s it emerged as a booming tourist resort, creating strong development pressures. St Mary's Church was by then in poor condition and could no longer meet the needs of the parish. In 1987 the Catholic Church gave the church building to the local community with the stipulation that it continue to be used for Christian purposes. As a Bicentennial Project, the church was relocated to parkland on the foreshore in November 1988. The Port Hill site was sold by the Church to finance construction of a new church on land elsewhere. Once relocated, the former St Mary's Church was restored and renamed St Mary's by the Sea. It is used as a non-denominational community church for religious and civil weddings, carol services and other special services and events.

== Description ==
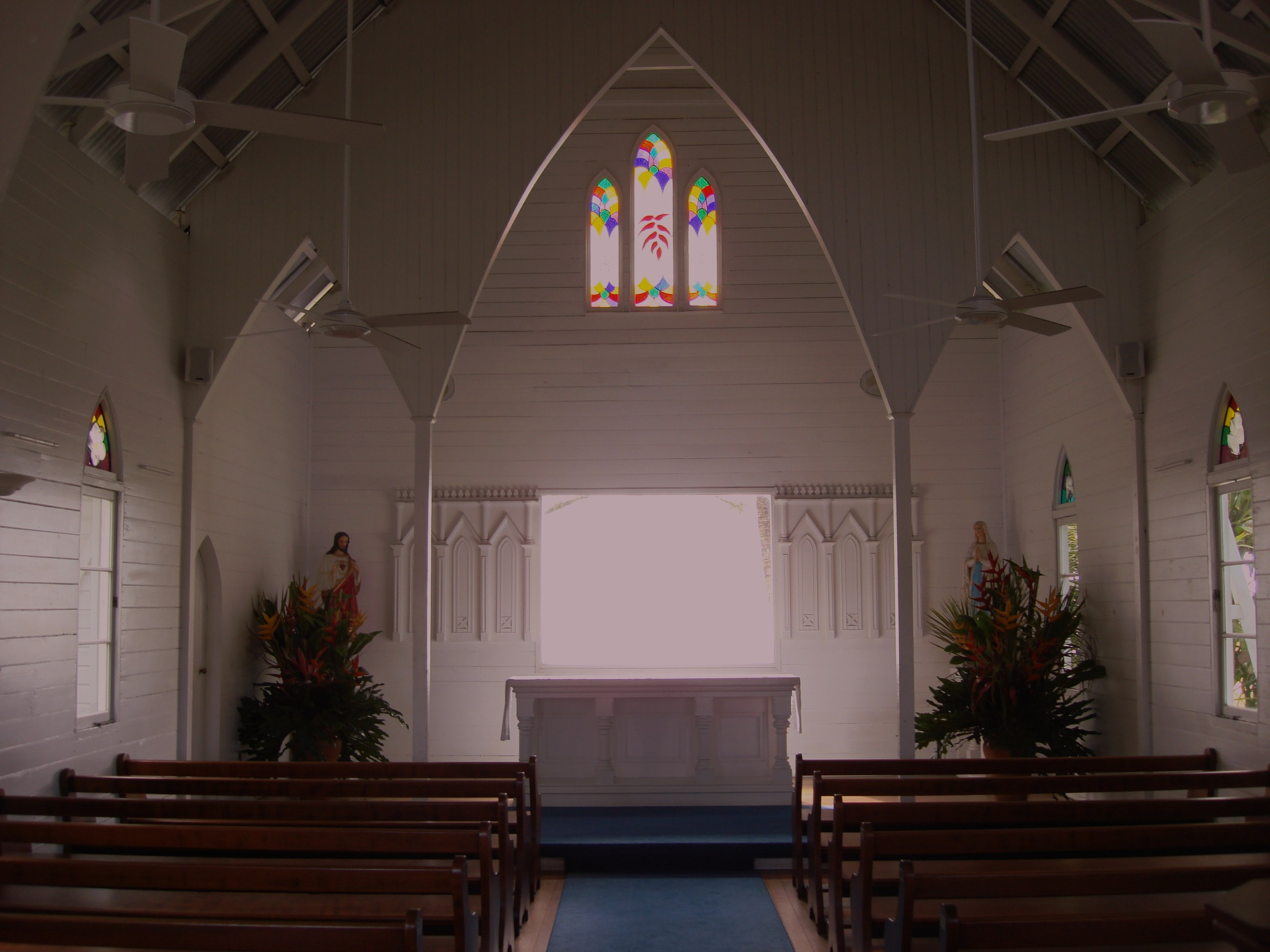
Church interior, 2008

St Mary's by the Sea is a small, Gothic-style timber church situated on the foreshore at Wharf Street near the road leading to Pier 319.

The church is a timber-framed structure with exposed exterior studwork set on low timber stumps. It has a steeply pitched gabled roof clad in corrugated iron. The building is rectangular in plan with a vestry off the rear corner and a small central porch at the front flanked by lancet windows. The porch has a gabled roof clad in corrugated iron and a side entrance and is lit by triple lancet windows. The side walls are braced by simple timber buttresses. The bearers and joists are of hickory ash and penda timbers and the framing is hickory ash. The wall cladding was of northern silky oak although much of this and the flooring has had to be replaced.

Internally, the ceiling is unlined and three lancet-shaped timber archways separate the sanctuary from the nave.

== Heritage listing ==
St Mary's by the Sea was listed on the Queensland Heritage Register on 21 October 1992 having satisfied the following criteria.

The place is important in demonstrating the evolution or pattern of Queensland's history.

The church of St Mary's by the Sea was built in 1914 and is associated with the early development of the Port Douglas district and the growth of the Catholic Church in North Queensland. It is one of the oldest buildings in Port Douglas and illustrates the built character of the town before modern redevelopment as a tourist resort.

The place is important in demonstrating the principal characteristics of a particular class of cultural places.

St Mary's is a good example of a modest church built to meet the needs of a small community in a remote area. Its simplicity, small scale and probable recycling of materials from its predecessor also illustrate the way in which many small communities of its era coped with the after effects of cyclones on towns with timber buildings.

The place has a strong or special association with a particular community or cultural group for social, cultural or spiritual reasons.

St Mary's has strong associations with the Catholic community of the area and has served Port Douglas for several generations. Community regard for the church was emphasised in 1988 when local people banded together to save and relocate the church as a community building.
