= FDA Carstens Memorial =

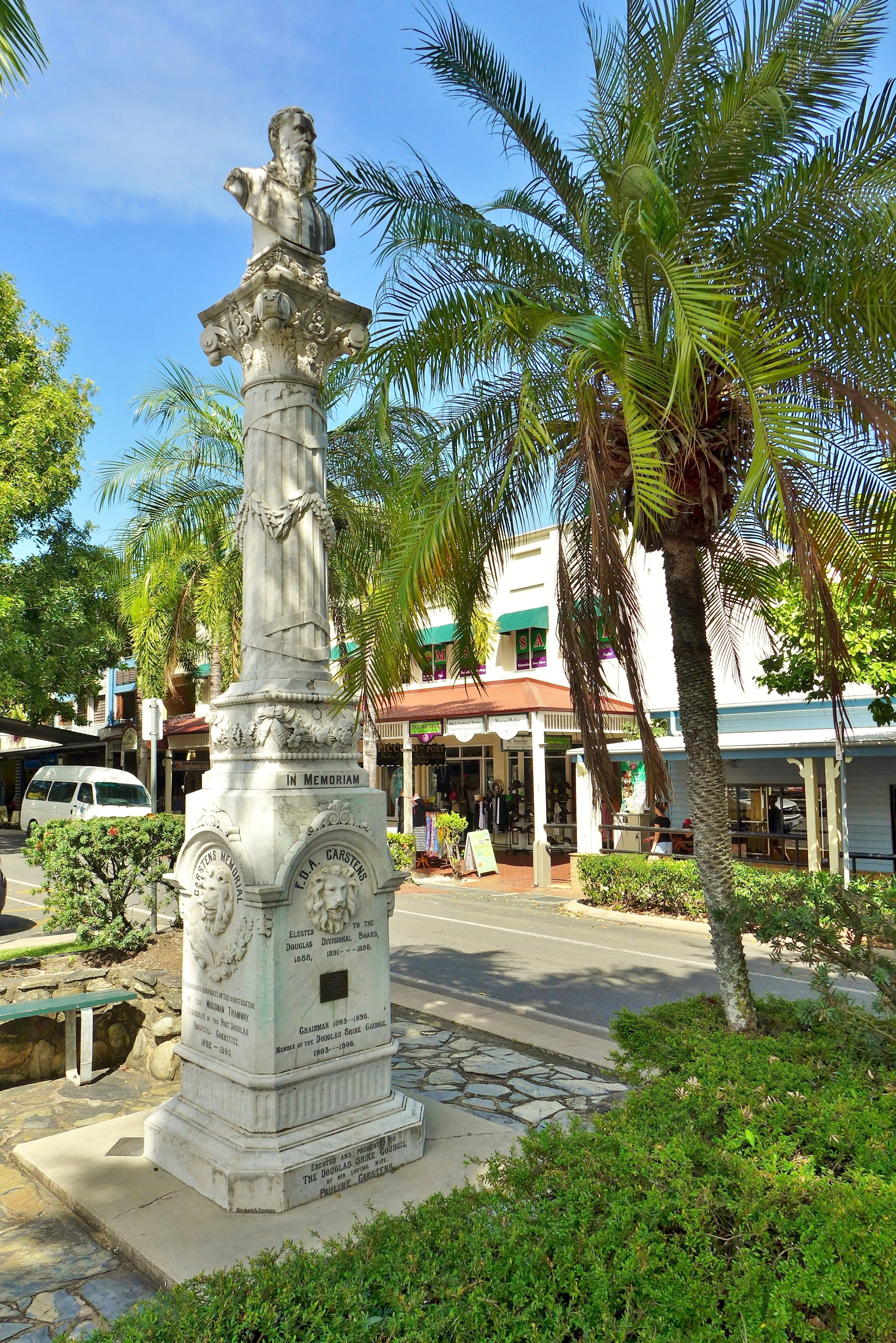
- FDA Carstens Memorial, 2015

- Location within Queensland
- 16.482°S 145.4636°E
- Location: Macrossan Street, Port Douglas, Shire of Douglas, Queensland, Australia

History
- Design period: 1900–1914 (early 20th century)
- Built: 1907–1908

Queensland Heritage Register
- Official name: FDA Carstens Memorial
- Type: state heritage (built)
- Designated: 9 September 2003
- Reference no.: 601053
- Significant period: 1907– (social, fabric); 1908 (historical)
- Significant components: memorial – pillar/s, memorial – statue, memorial/monument, memorial – drinking fountain
- Builders: Melrose & Fenwick (Townsville

FDA Carstens Memorial is a heritage-listed memorial at Macrossan Street, Port Douglas, Shire of Douglas, Queensland, Australia. It was built from 1907 to 1908 by Melrose & Fenwick (Townsville). It was added to the Queensland Heritage Register on 9 September 2003.

== History ==
The memorial was erected c. 1907–08 to honour Friederich Detleip Andreas Carstens, a Port Douglas publican and former Douglas Divisional Board Chairman. It was commissioned and paid for by his widow, Pauline Carstens, and presented c. 1907–08 to Douglas Shire Council as a public memorial drinking fountain. The work was carried out by the prominent Townsville-based monumental masonry firm of Melrose and Fenwick, who designed, constructed and supplied memorials and headstones throughout North Queensland in the first half of the 20th century.

FDA Carstens was born on 9 August 1838 in Olpinitz, Denmark, to wealthy parents. He was well educated, attending the Heidelberg University in Germany. As a young man he developed health problems, and decided to immigrate to Queensland to a more congenial climate. In 1866 he commenced business in Brisbane as a general merchant. He then moved with his first wife Catherine to Dalby and built a hotel there. He also operated a successful butchery in Dalby, buying out his competitor. At Dalby he commenced his career in public life, being elected a member of the Dalby municipal council. Continued ill health prompted a move to North Queensland, where he purchased a hotel at Herberton, on the Atherton Tablelands, prior to moving to Port Douglas in 1886 where he purchased the Exchange Hotel. The Exchange was the leading hotel in Port Douglas; the only two-storeyed hotel in town, boasting the only underground cellar. The Carstens resided on the premises.

FDA Carstens very quickly engaged in local politics. He served on the Douglas Divisional Board in 1888 and again 1891–1898, and on the Douglas Shire Council 1903–06. From 1893 to 1898 he served as the Chairman of the Douglas Divisional Board and was instrumental in the establishment of the Mossman Central Mill and the Port Douglas and Mossman tramway. Fellow councillors almost unanimously regarded Carstens as fair minded, energetic and having the best interests of the district at heart.

In 1895, as Divisional Board Chairman, Carstens stridently advocated for the tramway, extracting a loan of £22,000 from a reluctant government. The construction of a tramway between Mossman and Port Douglas serviced both communities, and allowed expansion of the district's agricultural and sugar industry. Carstens was actively involved in other community organizations, and served as Chairman of the Port Douglas Hospital Committee in 1892–1893. His personal interest in horse racing led him to become secretary of the Jockey Club.

Carstens' wife Catherine died at age 56 in 1895, and in 1897 he married Pauline Pratt. There were no children from either marriage.

Between 1899 and 1903 Carstens journeyed overseas, touring Britain, Germany, France, Italy and Denmark. Upon his return he served on the Douglas Shire Council until his death, after a long illness, in 1906.

After Carsten's death his widow commissioned North Queensland's leading monumental masonry firm Melrose and Fenwick Ltd. of Townsville, to construct a public monument to honour the memory of her husband. No expense was spared when she ordered the memorial. It was made of imported Italian Carrara marble, and featured carved lion heads on all four sides, two of which were drinking founts, and a life-size bust of her husband. The structure was made in block sections with pipes inserted into the base and then shipped and reassembled in Port Douglas. Mrs Carstens presented it to the Douglas Shire Council c. 1907–1908 and it was erected in the centre of the main street of Port Douglas, opposite the Exchange Hotel.

Around the same time Pauline Carstens also erected a very ornate and expensive gravestone on her husband's grave. It is the only grave in the Port Douglas cemetery to have a small marble border surrounding the plot with a jacquard marble and granite covering to the plot. The headstone is a large, detailed and ornate angel carved from Carrara marble.

In 1911, five years after Carstens' death, a cyclone crossed the coast causing extensive damage to the buildings of Port Douglas, including the top floor of the Exchange Hotel. Amidst the chaos, the monument stood firm and unscathed. Upon reconstruction the Exchange Hotel second story was never re-built.

Very little is known about the circumstance of presenting the memorial to the Douglas Shire Council or the arrangement made by Pauline Carstens for the memorial to be placed in a public thoroughfare. Douglas Shire Council minute books reputedly were destroyed in a fire c. 1908 and again by the 1911 cyclone. There are very few remaining copies of the local newspapers, the Port Douglas and Mossman Record or the Post Douglas and Mossman Gazette, for the period between 1905 and 1910.

By the late 1960s, the marble bowls beneath the founts had been removed and the fountain no longer functioned. The late 20th century North Queensland tourism boom, however, sparked renewed interest in the conservation of the memorial. In 1999 the Douglas Shire Council, in collaboration with the Port Douglas Restoration Society Incorporated, began to explore ways in which to conserve the monument. A report was commissioned and under the guidance of a restoration consultant, Mr. Peter Maxwell, the marble was cleaned. It was decided that the water feature would not be restored to working order due to the difficulties of replacing or cleaning the internal piping without damaging the stone.

== Description ==
The FDA Carstens Memorial is located on a traffic island in the centre of Macrossan Street, Port Douglas, in the principal business precinct between Grant and Wharf Streets. The monument is positioned approximately 90 metres (300 ft) from Grant Street and 190 metres (620 ft) from Wharf Street. The island that it stands on is approximately 10 by 6 metres (33 ft × 20 ft).

The memorial comprises a square base with truncated corners, square pedestal, a shaft in the form of a Grecian column, and bust, all in Carrara marble, and stands approximately 5 metres (16 ft) high to the top of the bust. The whole rests on a concrete plinth.

The pedestal features a lion head and leaded inscriptions on each of the four sides. On the northern face the inscription reads:

A vigorous advocate of the construction of the Mossman Tramway. Chairman of the Port Douglas Hospital Committee. 1892–1893.

Above the lion head on this face is the lettering "Carstens Memorial". The lettering on the southern face reads:

FDA Carstens. Arrived in Port Douglas 1886. Visited his native land 1899–1903.

The inscription above the eastern lion head reads "IN MEMORIAM" and below the lion head:

FDA Carstens. Born 9 August 1838. Died 20 September 1906.

The western face reads above the lion head "FDA Carstens" and below the lion head:

Elected to the Douglas Divisional board 1888, 1891–1893, Chairman 1893–1898, member of the Douglas Shire Council 1903–1906.

Below the northern and southern lion heads are semi-circular wreaths. The monument originally incorporated a fountain with water flowing from the mouths of the lion head on the eastern and western sides. Below each of these lion heads was a small marble bowl, since removed. On the eastern side of the base is the inscription:

Erected and presented to the Douglas Shire Council by his loving wife, Pauline Carstens

On two sides in small lettering at the base is the lettering "Melrose and Fenwick" and on another corner "Townsville".

The column above the pedestal comprises a small base, shaft and capital. On the base are carved garlands of leaves, flowers (including hibiscus and daisies) and bows. The shaft of the column is fluted and features wreaths and crossed banding, and the capital is in extrapolated Ionic style. Above the capital rests a life-size bust of FDA Carstens.

== Heritage listing ==
FDA Carstens Memorial was listed on the Queensland Heritage Register on 9 September 2003 having satisfied the following criteria.

The place is important in demonstrating the evolution or pattern of Queensland's history.

The FDA Carstens Memorial at Port Douglas, a decorative marble memorial drinking fountain erected c. 1907-08, is important in demonstrating part of the evolution of Queensland's history, being evidence of a period in which public memorials honouring prominent local citizens was an acceptable expression of public sentiment. This was particularly evident in North Queensland, where distance focused local loyalties.

The memorial is important in contributing to our knowledge of a body of similar public memorial drinking fountains of the late 19th and early 20th centuries, illustrating public taste and social values of the period.

The place is important in demonstrating the principal characteristics of a particular class of cultural places.

North Queensland public memorials similar in concept to the Carstens Memorial at Port Douglas have been erected to honour Dr EA Koch (Dr EA Koch Memorial, Cairns, 1903); Dr Lloyd (Mackay, c. 1907 drinking fountain); and WJ Castling (in Anzac Memorial Park, Townsville, 1908 drinking fountain. Mention should also be made of the earlier memorial to frontier heroine Mrs Mary Watson (Mary Watson's Monument, Cooktown, 1886 drinking fountain).

The FDA Carstens Memorial is important in illustrating the principal characteristics of its type: a decorative marble drinking fountain comprising a pedestal and shaft surmounted by a bust, with traditional lion head founts and relief work which includes traditional motifs such as laurel leaves, oak leaves, forget-me-nots and daisies but also incorporates an unusual tropical motif, the hibiscus flower.

The place is important because of its aesthetic significance.

The memorial is important in exhibiting particular aesthetic characteristics valued by the community. When originally installed it was a prominent landmark in Port Douglas due to its location in the centre of the main street of the town, its height, and its stark white marble grandeur. In 1999, conservation work was carried out to clean the marble and enhance the immediate area surrounding the memorial, indicating that the community still values the aesthetic appeal.

The FDA Carstens Memorial is important in demonstrating the high quality of the work of North Queensland monumental masonry firm Melrose and Fenwick. The decorative details on the memorial were likely executed by their artisan Harry Orton who was renowned for intricate relief work.

The place has a special association with the life or work of a particular person, group or organisation of importance in Queensland's history.

Erected in memory of Friederich Detleip Andreas Carstens, the memorial has a special association with the life and work of a man who contributed substantially to the advancement of the Port Douglas and Mossman region between 1886 and 1906, enabling the district to grow and prosper through his involvement with the Douglas Divisional Board and his role in promoting the construction of both the Mossman Central Mill and the Port Douglas and Mossman tramway.
