= Port Douglas Court House Museum =

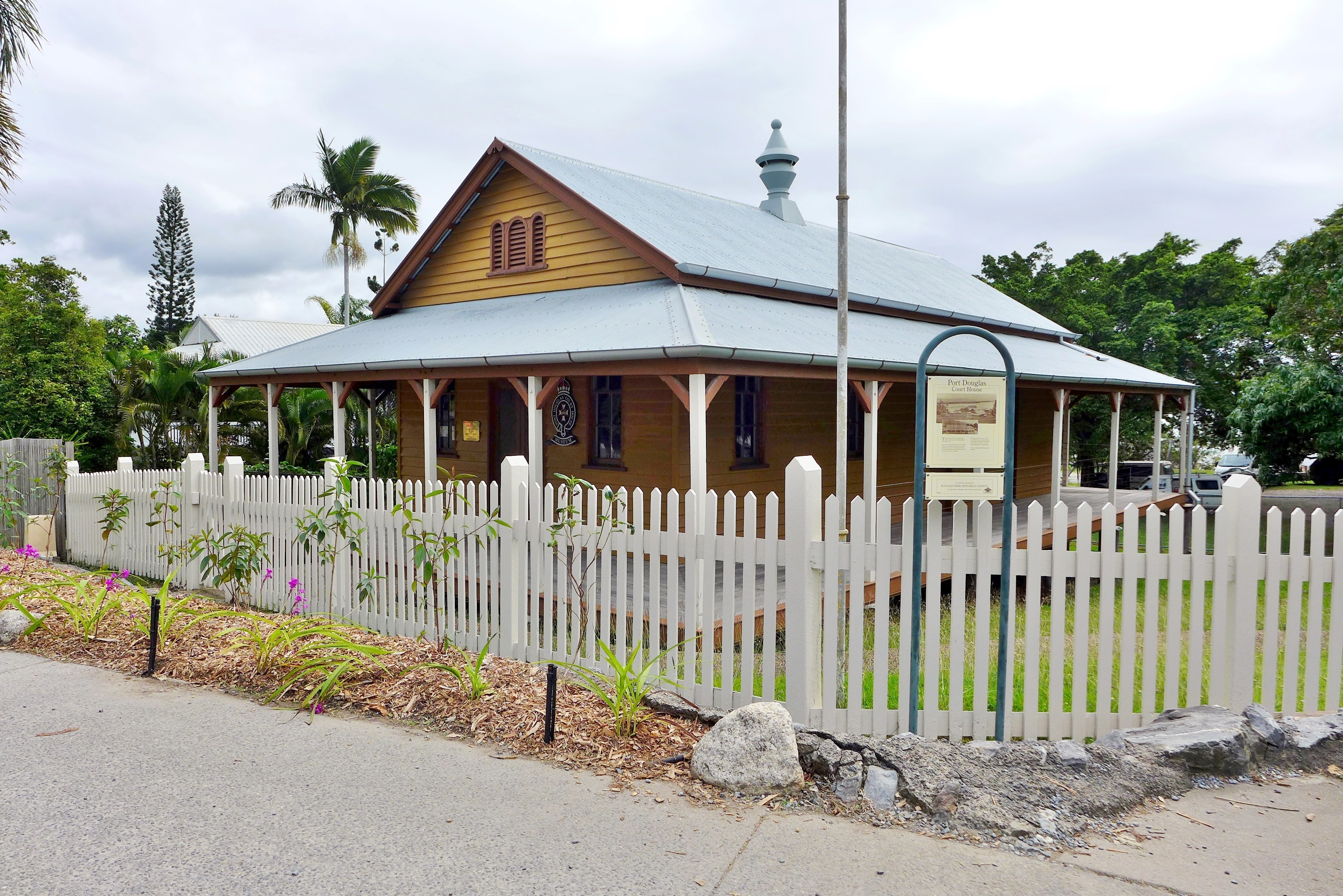
- Port Douglas Court House Museum, 2015

- Location within Queensland Location within Australia
- 16.4796°S 145.4628°E
- Location: 25 Wharf Street, Port Douglas, Shire of Douglas, Queensland, Australia

History
- Design period: 1870s–1890s (late 19th century)
- Built: 1879–1911

Site notes
- Architect: Colonial Architect's Office
- Architectural style: Classicism

Queensland Heritage Register
- Official name: Port Douglas Court House Museum, Port Douglas Court House
- Type: state heritage (built)
- Designated: 21 October 1992
- Reference no.: 600465
- Significant period: 1870s–1880s (historical); 1870s–1910s (fabric); 1879–ongoing (social)
- Significant components: court house
- Builders: Thomas Watson

Port Douglas Court House Museum is a heritage-listed former courthouse and now museum at 25 Wharf Street, Port Douglas, Shire of Douglas, Queensland, Australia. It was designed by the Queensland Colonial Architect's Office and built from 1879 by Thomas Watson. It was formerly known as Port Douglas Court House. It was added to the Queensland Heritage Register on 21 October 1992. The museum is operated by the Port Douglas Historical Society.

== History ==
The Port Douglas Court House was constructed in 1879 as the first court house in the town. It is a simple timber structure with verandahs to all four elevations.

The Port Douglas Court House is one of the earliest surviving timber constructed court houses in Queensland. When Queensland separated from New South Wales in 1859, there were only six court houses in the new colony. During the next forty years, over 145 court houses were erected in Queensland, ranging from slab structures to the substantial Supreme Court building in Brisbane (destroyed by arson in 1968).

Port Douglas was established shortly after the discovery of gold on the Hodgkinson River in 1876. At this time the nearest port was Cairns, which was only accessible over difficult and mountainous terrain. In 1877, well-known bushman Christy Palmerston discovered a new route which gave easier access from the goldfields to the coast. By the end of the year, the site had been surveyed, declared a port of entry and clearance and officially named Port Douglas.

Trade from the goldfields quickly transferred from Cairns to the new township, followed by businesses. The government expressed confidence in Port Douglas by allocating £2000 for a road to the Hodgkinson River and also by constructing many public buildings in the town in the early stages of its development.

The Court House was constructed in 1879. The first Police Magistrate arrived in 1878, and the only place to conduct court sessions was in one of the newly constructed police cells. This was considered unsuitable, and the new Police Magistrate requested that a tent be sent. Court sessions were conducted in the tent for most of 1878, until the court moved into the newly completed Customs House. As the population increased, it became obvious that a purpose built court house was necessary.

When Port Douglas was surveyed, land on the southern side of Wharf Street was reserved for Court House and Post Office purposes. However, by the time the plan was released, a building was already constructed on this site. The owner of the building was offered the land and the Court House was subsequently constructed on the opposite side of Wharf Street.

The building was designed by the Colonial Architect's office to suit the climate and the functions of a court house. It comprised a rectangular core with the court room at the front and two offices at the rear with verandahs to all four elevations. Access to the verandah was via a centrally located stair at the front. Additional sets of stairs were located at the eastern end of each side elevation.

Tenders were called in May 1879 and although local builders were among the tenderers, the contract was won by Brisbane builder Thomas Watson, probably as he was experienced in building court houses, primarily that at St Lawrence the previous year, which was similar in design.

Watson began construction in September and the building was completed in November at a cost of £475. The completed building differed slightly from the original plan in that it did not have a dividing partition between the rear offices, resulting in one large office rather than two smaller ones.

In 1880, the rear corner of the verandah was enclosed to provide a jury room. Complaints had been made by Judge Hely in 1879 regarding the lack of a jury room and approval to incorporate one at a cost of £20 was given in September 1879. Thomas Watson, who had stayed in Port Douglas to construct a number of other government buildings, completed the addition in May 1880. Thomas was again employed when the new jury room was found to be too small and the central section of the verandah at the rear of the office was extended and enclosed to create a more suitable space.

In the following years, much of the verandah flooring and almost all of the stumps were replaced due to deterioration inflicted by the weather and white ants. No major alterations were made until a cyclone in 1911 almost destroyed the building.

The cyclone occurred in March 1911 and left the building partially unroofed and blown off its stumps, some of which pierced the floor. An Inspector of Works was sent to assess the building and recommended realigning the building to face Wharf Street to avoid the soft ground at the rear of the building. The opportunity was also taken to construct a detached room at the rear of the building for police purposes. In fact, the alterations were so substantial that when tenders were called, they were titled New Court House, Port Douglas. The tender for the additions and alterations was won by local builder H A Nielson, at a cost of £334.

After these major alterations were completed, no further work apart from general maintenance was undertaken until 1958 when an inspection identified that the weatherboards had shrunk to such an extent that light shone through the gaps in the unlined walls. This resulted in the court and judge's rooms being fully lined with hardboard.

The continued use of this building is indicative of the success of its simple design, which was used for many Queensland court houses up until the 1930s.

Although the Port Douglas Court House was primarily used as a place to conduct court sessions, it was also used for other purposes including police offices and briefly, as a residence for the town's only police officer. It was also considered as a site for the local school. Most of the cases heard were of a modest nature, the exception being one of the most notable court cases in Queensland history when in 1886 Ellen Thompson was found guilty of murder and sentenced to death. In June 1887 she became the only woman to be hanged in Queensland.

The building was vacated in 1961 and after strong lobbying from the National Trust of Queensland and local groups to retain the building on its original site, was sold to B Whiting in 1968. The Court house and adjacent police cells were subsequently removed to the grounds of the Court House Hotel.

The cells were destroyed when a tree fell on them and a fire partially destroyed the detached former police offices. In 1993, the Court House was moved back to its original site, in the same position as when it was first constructed.

Since April 1997, the building has been used as a museum which was established by the Douglas Shire Historical Society. It incorporates displays pertaining to the history of the court house and also to local history.

== Description ==
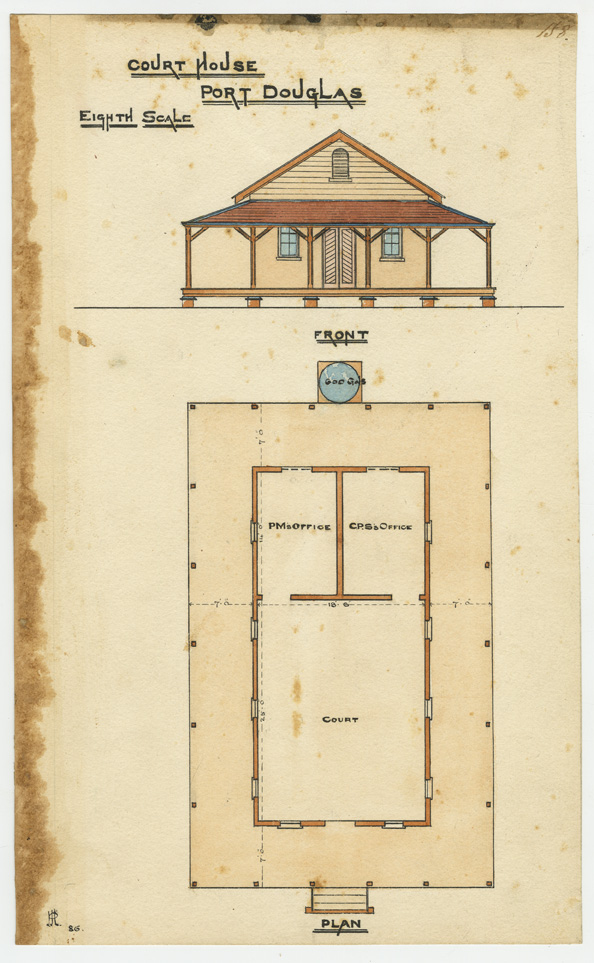
Architectural plans, 1879

The Port Douglas Court House is a simple timber clad structure, rectangular in plan and surrounded by verandahs on all four sides. It is elevated on low timber stumps with a gabled corrugated iron roof.

It is now relocated in its original position fronting Wharf Street and sits in a park-like tropical setting adjacent to the water.

The verandah roof is separate from the main roof and is supported by regularly spaced posts with simple diagonal braces in place of brackets at the top. The entrance is via a centrally located set of stairs at the front of the building, leading to a pair of timber doors featuring panels of diagonally laid boards. These are flanked by double hung four paned windows on either side.

Two pairs of French doors with glass panels to the top sections are located in the rear elevation and two similarly detailed single doors are located at the rear of the southern elevation. Evenly spaced double hung windows are located along the remainder of this side and along the opposite side. Gable end vents are centrally located in each gable end, the front one comprising three louvred arched forms.

Internally the building is divided into three rooms; the court room at the front and a smaller room at the rear. The front room is further divided to form a small room in the corner, which is only accessible externally.

Much of the original fabric survives in the main core of the building, however, some sections of the building have been reconstructed.

== Heritage listing ==
Port Douglas Court House Museum was listed on the Queensland Heritage Register on 21 October 1992 having satisfied the following criteria.

The place is important in demonstrating the evolution or pattern of Queensland's history.

The Port Douglas Court House was constructed in 1879. It was the first court house to be constructed in Port Douglas and demonstrates the rapid development of the town after the discovery of gold in 1876 at the nearby Hodgkinson River. As an early government building in far northern Queensland, it is demonstrative of the development of Queensland.

The place demonstrates rare, uncommon or endangered aspects of Queensland's cultural heritage.

It is rare as one of the few surviving pre 1880s timber buildings in North Queensland, as the oldest building in Port Douglas and the second oldest timber court house in Queensland.

The place is important in demonstrating the principal characteristics of a particular class of cultural places.

The Port Douglas Court House demonstrates the principal characteristics of court houses constructed in regional towns during the early development of the state.

The place is important because of its aesthetic significance.

The place has considerable aesthetic significance due to its setting in a park setting near the ocean and the simple symmetricality of the building.

The place has a strong or special association with a particular community or cultural group for social, cultural or spiritual reasons.

The place has strong associations with the local community who lobbied to retain the building on its original site and who were instrumental in having the building re-located back to its original position. The building is now presented as a museum which is maintained by a local community group.
