= Port Douglas Wharf =

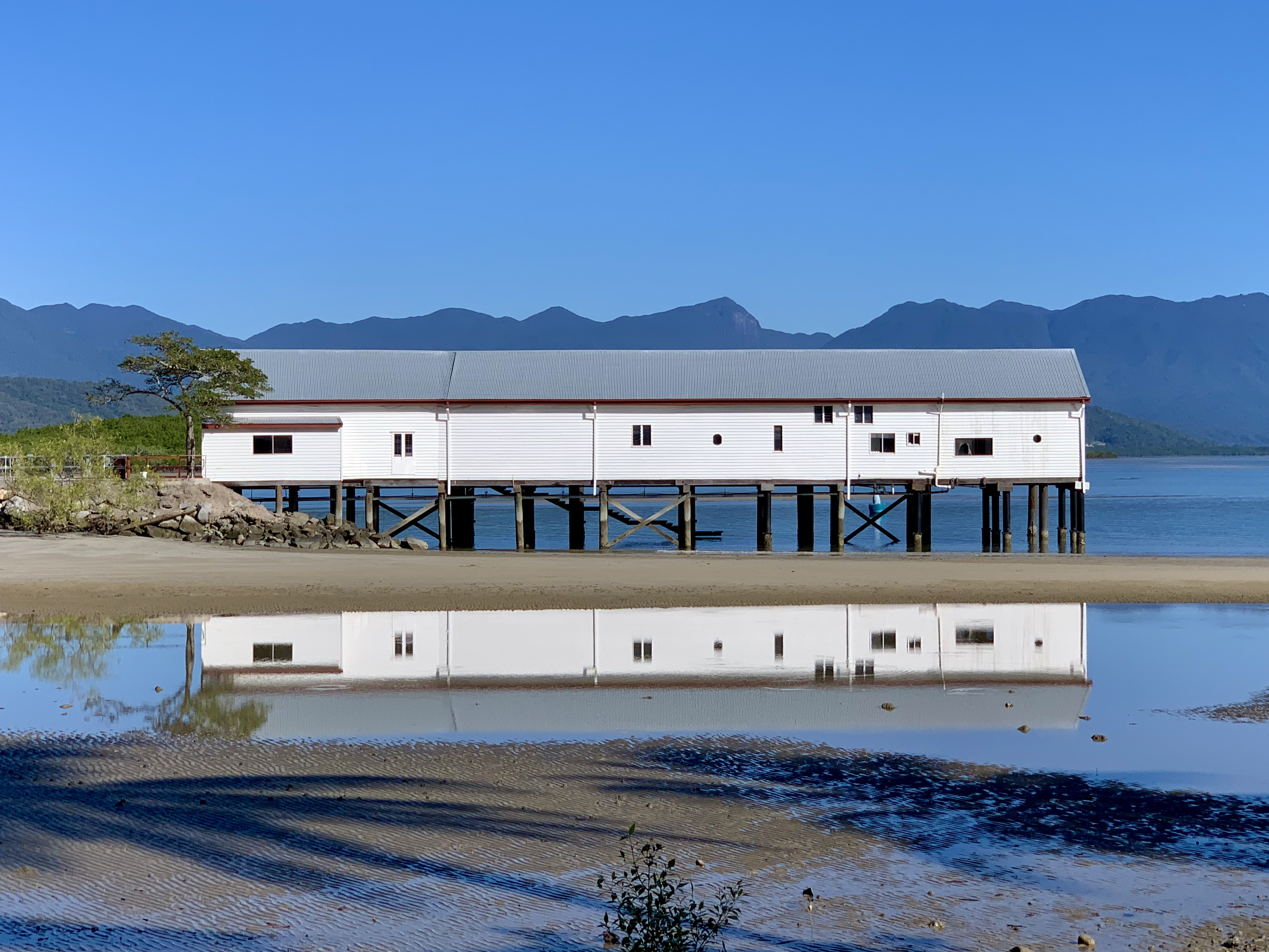
- Port Douglas Wharf and Storage Shed, 2020

- Location within Queensland Location within Australia
- 16.48°S 145.4608°E
- Location: 6 Dixie Street, Port Douglas, Shire of Douglas, Queensland, Australia

History
- Design period: 1900–1914 (early 20th century)
- Built: 1904

Queensland Heritage Register
- Official name: Port Douglas Wharf and Storage Shed (former), Port Douglas Wharf and Shipwreck Museum
- Type: state heritage (built)
- Designated: 21 October 1992
- Reference no.: 600466
- Significant period: 1900s–1950s (historical)
- Significant components: pile/s, shed – storage, wharf/dock/quay

Port Douglas Wharf is a heritage-listed wharf at 6 Dixie Street, Port Douglas, Shire of Douglas, Queensland, Australia. It was built in 1904. It was also known as Shipwreck Museum. It was added to the Queensland Heritage Register on 21 October 1992.

== History ==
Port Douglas Wharf and Storage Shed were erected in 1904 for the Douglas Shire Council, the buildings reported demolished by the cyclone of 1911, with extensions to the storage shed made in the 1920s.

Port Douglas was established in 1877 as a port to service the newly opened Hodgkinson Goldfield, west of the Great Dividing Range. In the period 1877 to 1893, Port Douglas functioned primarily as a port for the mining hinterland and secondarily as an administrative and service centre for the surrounding developing agricultural districts. The development of Port Douglas initially outpaced that of its nearby rival, Cairns, established in 1876. However, following the 1885 political decision to site the terminus for the Atherton Tableland Railway at Cairns, this town advanced rapidly at the expense of Port Douglas. After the opening of the Cairns to Mareeba railway in 1893, trade between Port Douglas and the mining hinterland declined markedly, and virtually ceased after the extension of the railway to Mount Molloy in 1908. Much of what remained of the township was further decimated in a severe cyclone on 16 March 1911.

However, from the 1890s until 1958, Port Douglas survived principally as a sugar port. The town was also the administrative centre of Douglas Shire until the 1920s, when headquarters were shifted to Mossman in the heart of the expanding sugar lands. During the 1960s and 1970s, Port Douglas functioned mainly as a fishing and holiday town, retaining much of its historic character, but in the 1980s the town emerged as a booming tourist resort, with strong pressures for development.

It appears that the wharf was built to serve the handling of general cargo (as opposed to sugar) in preference to at least one other previous proposal for a jetty at Macrossan Street. Prior to this, it seems that all general cargo handling was carried out at the private wharfing facilities (variously Walsh & Co., Davidson's, Jack & Newell and possibly others), either by direct berthing for smaller vessels or for larger vessels by lightering from the general anchorage some 600 metres (2,000 ft) off the western end of Island Point. A stone-pitched jetty adjacent to the quarry site on the north-east corner of Island Point had been constructed earlier for passenger traffic, and was extended during 1888–1889 to a total length of 60 metres (200 ft).

In 1904, Douglas Shire Council obtained a loan from the Queensland Government to build a new wharf for the berthing of ships at a more convenient site in the harbour. This wharf was built with a decline from wharf to shore to ease the transfer of loaded rail trucks. A stone pitched ramp was built as part of the wharf construction. The 1904 wharf structure was about 15 metres (49 ft) wide, with a storage shed 30 metres (98 ft) long by 8 metres (26 ft) wide on the north-east corner of the decking. A jib crane was located on the northern end of the wharf and walkways were constructed alongside the storage shed.

During the early 1920s an additional row of piles was driven about 3 metres (9.8 ft) to the east along the length of the wharf. The 1904 storage shed was relocated over these by sliding the structure back from the wharf outer face. It appears that at this period the shed was extended on the southern end by about 12 metres (39 ft). A lunch room building, also holding a fresh water tank, on the southern end of the storage shed was relocated to the same respective position when the shed was extended.

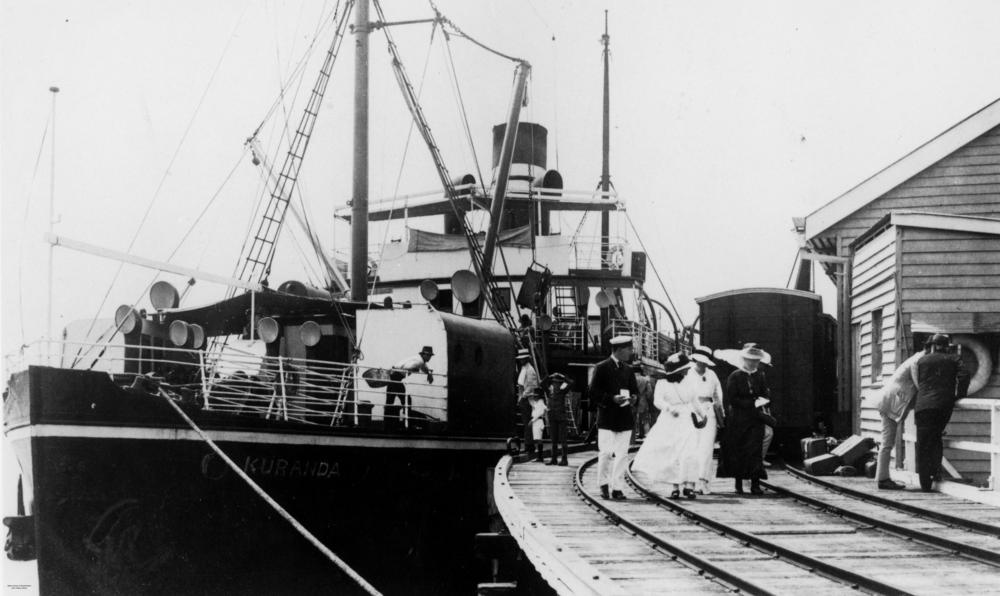
The ship Kuranda at Port Douglas wharf, 1917

The wharf was last used for sugar shipment on 1 April 1958. Subsequently, the wharf was leased for private enterprise from 1963 until January 1975. Well known Queensland diver Ben Cropp held a twenty-year lease over the storage shed from October 1979. He operated a shipwreck museum in the shed which also included his living quarters. The lease was briefly extended into mid-2000. Cropp relocated the museum to Cairns later that year.

The foreshore near the Port Douglas Wharf was reclaimed in the late twentieth century, and the 1904 timber-piled and timber-framed jetty between the stone-pitched ramp and the storage shed was removed.

== Description ==
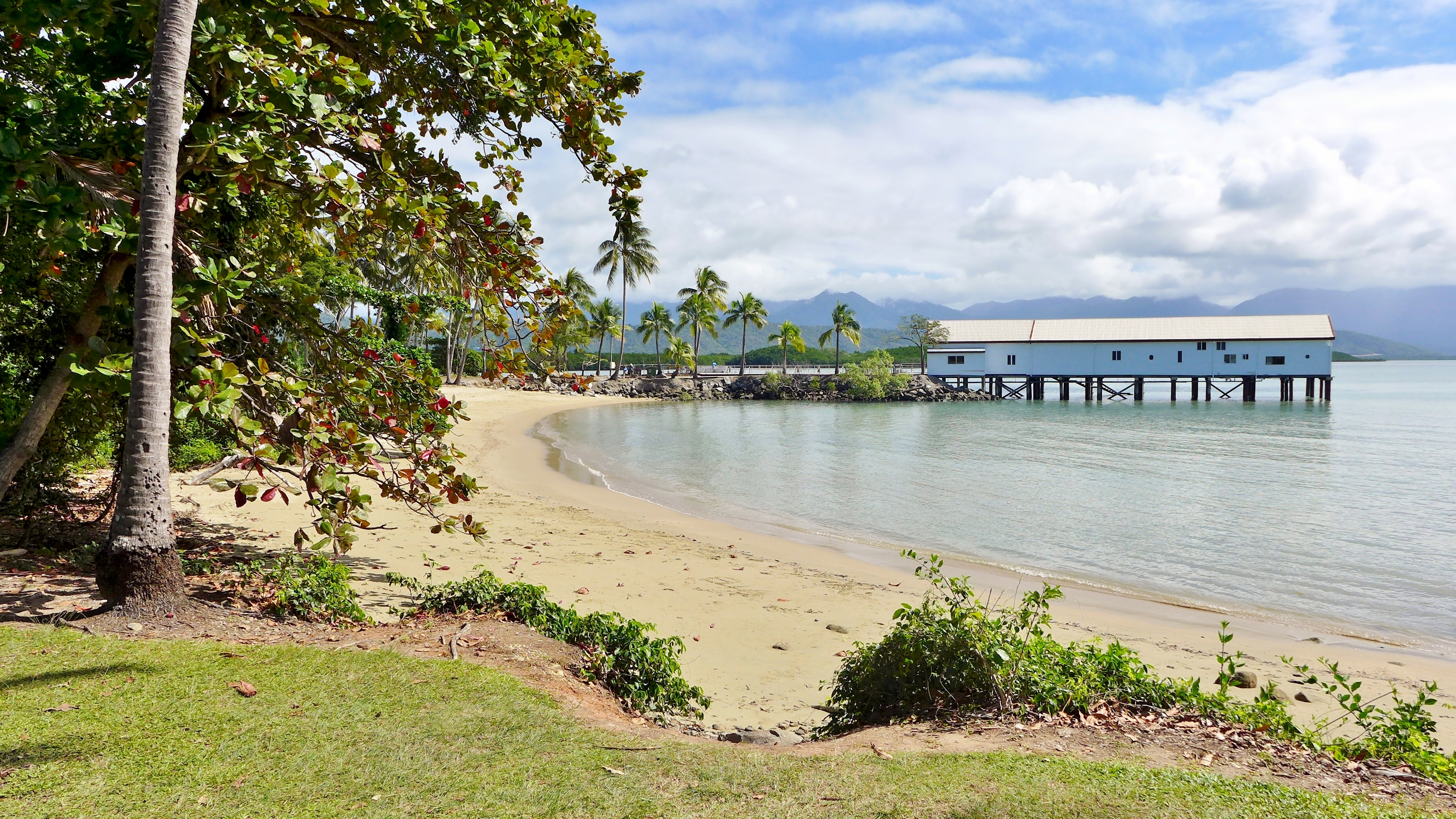
Wharf as part of the Port Douglas waterfront, 2015

This wharf is at the entrance to Dickson's Inlet approximately opposite the western end of Warner Street.

The wharf, which is constructed parallel to the channel, is of timber construction about 70 metres (230 ft) long (including the decked approach ramp) by 18 metres (59 ft) wide and supporting a wooden storage shed on the eastern side.

The storage shed roof trusses are constructed from 300 by 150 millimetres (11.8 in × 5.9 in) and 200 by 150 millimetres (7.9 in × 5.9 in) sections, mainly Oregon, and the storage shed was planked internally to facilitate the stacking of bagged sugar.

A simple gable roofed form building, the former wharf storage building is built out over the water on timber piles braced by diagonal timbers.

The new corrugated steel roof is exposed internally and supported on burlings spanning between major trusses of mainly Oregon members. Timber planes fixed with dogspikes form the floor.

The building is an important element in the townscape of Port Douglas, being most visible from the sea and surrounding hills.

An earlier stone pitched ramp remains in evidence at the side of the later earth-filled access to the former storage shed and wharf.

== Heritage listing ==
The former Port Douglas Wharf and Storage Shed was listed on the Queensland Heritage Register on 21 October 1992 having satisfied the following criteria.

The place is important in demonstrating the evolution or pattern of Queensland's history.

The building is significant for its historical association with the development of Port Douglas as a shipping terminal.
