= Batt Reef =

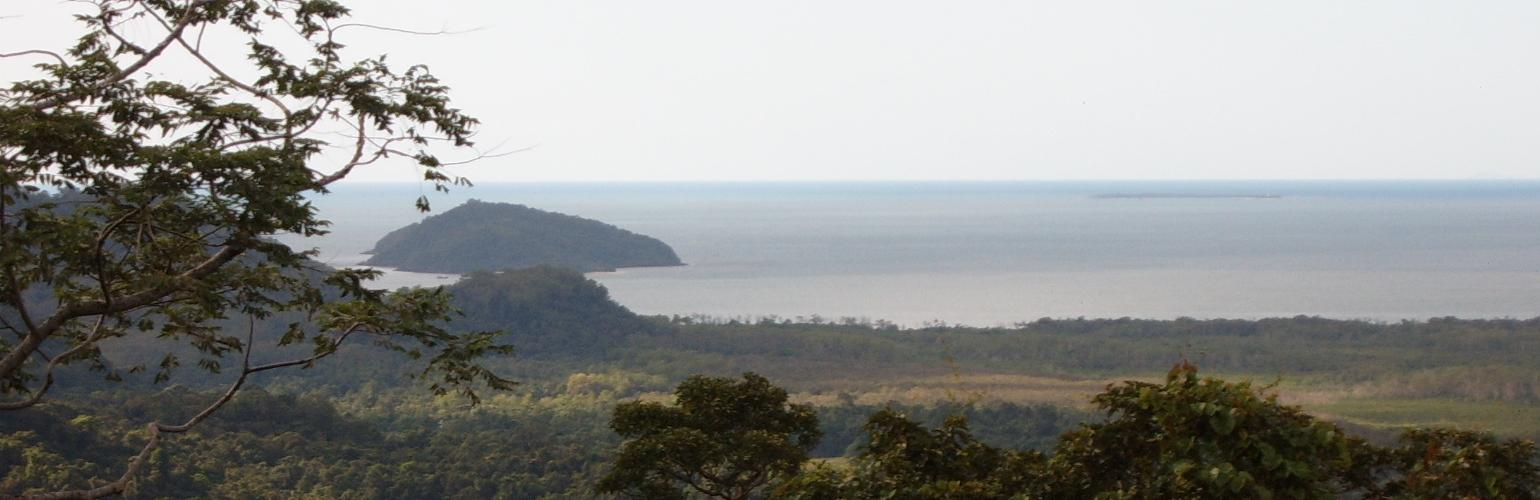
- L-R looking south-east: Cape Kimberley, Snapper Island, Low Islets (Low and Woody Islands) with Batt Reef beyond

- Coordinates: 16.4137°S 145.7670°E
- Country: Australia
- State: Queensland
- Location: 11 km (6.8 mi) NE of Port Douglas

Area
  - Total: 90 km^{2} (35 sq mi)

Batt Reef is a coral reef in the Coral Sea off Port Douglas in the Shire of Douglas, Queensland, Australia.

== Geography ==
Batt Reef is centred at 16.413°S 145.7670°E The reef is about 18 km long by 5 km (11 miles by 3 miles) wide, lying northwest to southeast, at the northern side of the Trinity Passage that leads from the inner Reef channel from Trinity Bay to the Pacific Ocean. The north-west tip of the reef lies 15 km (9.3 mi) east of the Low Islets (Low and Woody Islands) which are in turn 16 km (9.9 mi) east of Newell Beach and 11 km (6.8 mi) northeast of Port Douglas.

== History ==
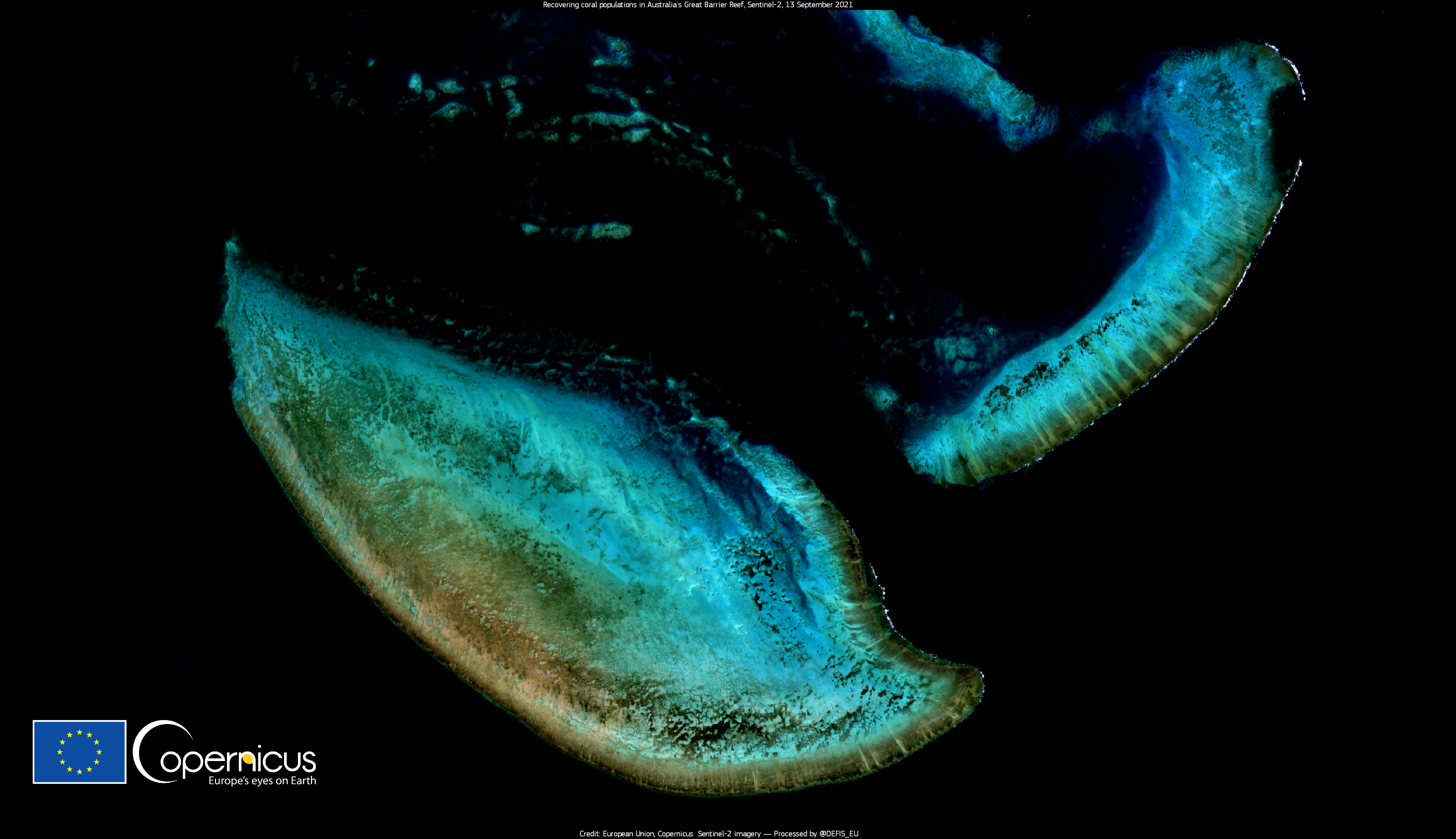
Batt Reef (lower left), 2021

The area received a high level of media attention following the death of The Crocodile Hunter star Steve Irwin on 4 September 2006 from a stingray attack, while filming an underwater documentary entitled Ocean's Deadliest.
