= Christopher Skase =

Australian businessman (1948–2001)

Christopher Charles Skase
- Born: 18 September 1948; Melbourne, Victoria, Australia
- Died: 5 August 2001 (aged 52); Mallorca, Spain
- Occupations: Stockbroker; Media proprietor
- Years active: 1975–1991
- Spouse: Pixie Skase

Christopher Charles Skase (18 September 1948 – 5 August 2001) was an Australian businessman who later became one of his country's most wanted fugitives, after his business empire crashed spectacularly and he fled to Mallorca, Spain.

== Early life ==
Skase was born into a wealthy Melbourne family. His father was Charles Skase, 1948 winner of the Melbourne Sun-Aria, and prominent on-air personality on radio station 3DB, including his role as star of the live-to-air program, The Happy Gang, in the 1950s. Skase was educated at Malvern and Caulfield Grammar Schools.

== Career ==
Skase began his career as a stockbroker, but soon became a finance journalist instead, working at The Sun News-Pictorial. In 1975 he purchased Qintex, a small Tasmanian company. By 1980 he was executive chairman of Hardy Brothers jewellers.

Skase slowly developed Qintex and, over several years, turned it into one of Australia's larger corporations. In March 1981 as chairman, Skase announced that the company had acquired a 5.89 per cent interest in regional television and radio operator Victorian Broadcasting Network Ltd. By the late 1980s, the Qintex group was worth A$1.5 billion. Skase owned five resorts as well as interests in the Seven television network and the Brisbane Bears football club. On the eve of the 1990 economic recession, his two Mirage resorts in Queensland were among the largest in the country and one of them, the Mirage Port Douglas Resort, played a key role in putting the formerly small town of Port Douglas on the international tourist map.

Skase became known for his displays of wealth, with a lavish 40th birthday party in 1988, and a company Christmas party that cost $450,000. In one particular incident, he had his private jet fly from Port Douglas to Melbourne to pick up a dress for his wife, Pixie.

== Downfall ==
By 1989, interest rates had risen, an attempt to buy the United Artists film studio from MGM/UA Communications for $600 million fell through, and Skase was forced to sell half of his resorts to Japanese investors. In the months that followed, it became clear that Skase and the Qintex group had overextended themselves.

According to a 1998 report by ABC program Four Corners, Skase had begun obtaining and moving money into foreign bank accounts in July 1989. Despite efforts lasting more than a decade, Max Donnelly, the creditors' trustee, was unable to trace much of the missing money.

At a meeting in October, Skase began to fall out with the Qintex board. He demanded that the board pay $13.5 million to a private company that he owned. The board refused to ratify the payment, but soon discovered that the payment had already been made. Skase then demanded the board give him a pay rise, and threatened to resign if he did not receive it. The board refused, with several members themselves threatening to resign.

One of the directors reported the incident to the Australian Securities Commission. The creditors moved in, and Qintex collapsed. Skase was forced to sell the Seven Network for a tiny portion of what he had paid for it. In the end, Skase was more than $700 million in debt. He began to parcel up his remaining wealth, including more than $900,000 worth of antiques and furniture.

== Exile to Spain ==
Skase was charged with improperly using his position to obtain management fees, briefly arrested and spent a night in jail. However, he was subsequently released and allowed to regain his passport. He promptly fled the country. His discovery on the Spanish island of Mallorca in 1991 by the Sydney Morning Herald sparked intense media interest. In 1994, the Australian Securities Commission assembled a case against Skase, with the assistance of former Skase associate Lawrence Van der Plaat, and began to chase him in earnest.

Throughout the 1990s, successive Australian governments, in combination with Max Donnelly, attempted to have Skase extradited from Spain, with no success. Skase claimed that he was unable to travel due to a life-threatening lung condition. This was disputed by the Australian government, who released a video filmed by some Australian tourists, which featured Skase walking easily on a local beach. During this period, Skase also attempted to build a new business empire, and continued to live in a multimillion-dollar mansion.

In one incident, television personality Andrew Denton organized a public subscription to hire a bounty hunter to kidnap Skase. However, after raising $250,000 the idea was called off on legal advice.

In May 1998, the Australian government canceled Skase's passport. Skase was ordered to leave Mallorca by 23 July, but lodged an appeal. The extradition process was still tied up in the courts when, the following month, he became a citizen of Dominica. At this point, numerous commentators suggested that the chase was over, and that there was nothing more that could be done to bring Skase back to Australia.

== Personal life ==
Skase was married to Pixie Skase. She remained in exile in Dominica until returning to Melbourne in 2008. Pixie Skase died in Melbourne on 15 November 2024, aged 83.

== Death ==
By 2001, both the Australian government and Donnelly were starting to grow weary of the large costs of continuing the chase for Skase with $3 million having been spent. Nevertheless, there was renewed speculation in January that Skase would soon be deported from Spain – in which case it would have been legally possible to bring him back to Australia, with which Dominica had an extradition treaty. However, he became ill and died of stomach cancer in Mallorca on 5 August 2001, before any further proceedings had taken place.

== In popular culture ==
A satirical 2001 film, Let's Get Skase, is based on an invented plot to kidnap Christopher Skase in Mallorca.

TISM bassist Jock Cheese's solo album Platter features the song "Totally Addicted to Skase", whose title parodies "Addicted to Bass", about the media coverage of the chase for Skase.

Skase is the subject of the 5-part podcast series Skase: Fall of a Tycoon (2025), presented by Radio National as part of their program ABC Rewind.
