= Low Island (Queensland) =

Island in Queensland, Australia

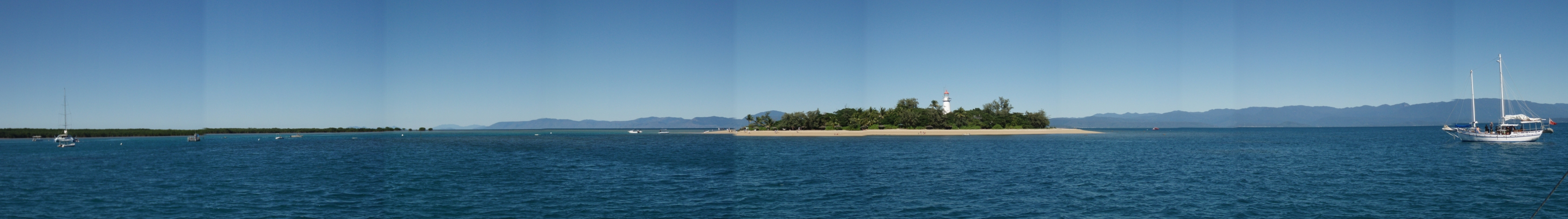
- Low Island with lighthouse
- Interactive map of Low Island

Geography
- Location: Coral Sea
- Coordinates: 16°23′3″S 145°33′36″E
- Archipelago: Low Isles
- Area: 0.02 km^{2} (0.0077 sq mi)

Administration
- Australia
- State: Queensland
- Shire of Douglas

Demographics
- Population: 2

Low Island is an island lying about 25 km (16 mi) north-east of Port Douglas in Trinity Bay, North Queensland. It is around 2 hectares or 0.02 square km in size. It is part of the Low Isles, along with Woody Island, an uninhabited coral cay covered in thick tidal mangroves and protected as a wildlife sanctuary. The isles are surrounded by 55 acres (220,000 m^{2}) of reef. The Low Islets are a Marine National Park Zone.

Day visitors come to the island on a regular basis via a number of commercial operators. There is a lagoon where private vessels can moor or anchor outside the reef protection markers overnight, but there is no overnight accommodation on the island. There is a weather station and an active lighthouse (named Low Isles Light). No fishing is allowed in the lagoon or within a buffer zone around the islands. Motorised water sports are not permitted in the locality. There is a 6 knot limit. No open fires of any sort or dogs are permitted on either island, and no island access between sunset and sunrise.

The island's only permanent population are the caretaker and their family who act as the islets' groundskeepers, maintaining the buildings and raking the coral rubble Low Isles Heritage Walk. The last lighthouse keepers left in 1993 when the light was automated.

== History ==
The islands were first observed by Captain James Cook in 1770 and described as "a small low island"

The light house was erected in 1877 and automated in 1993. The lighthouse is constructed from a timber frame with a galvanised sheath.

The first detailed study of corals and reef formation was conduced at low isles in 1928 by a European lead expedition.

In 1979 the first commercial day boat to low isles, the Martin Cash, was opened by Jim and Jo Wallace.

On 4 September 2006, Steve Irwin was killed by a stingray on Batt Reef to the east of Low Island. He was rushed to Low Island where he was pronounced dead.
