= Death of Steve Irwin =

2006 animal encounter accident

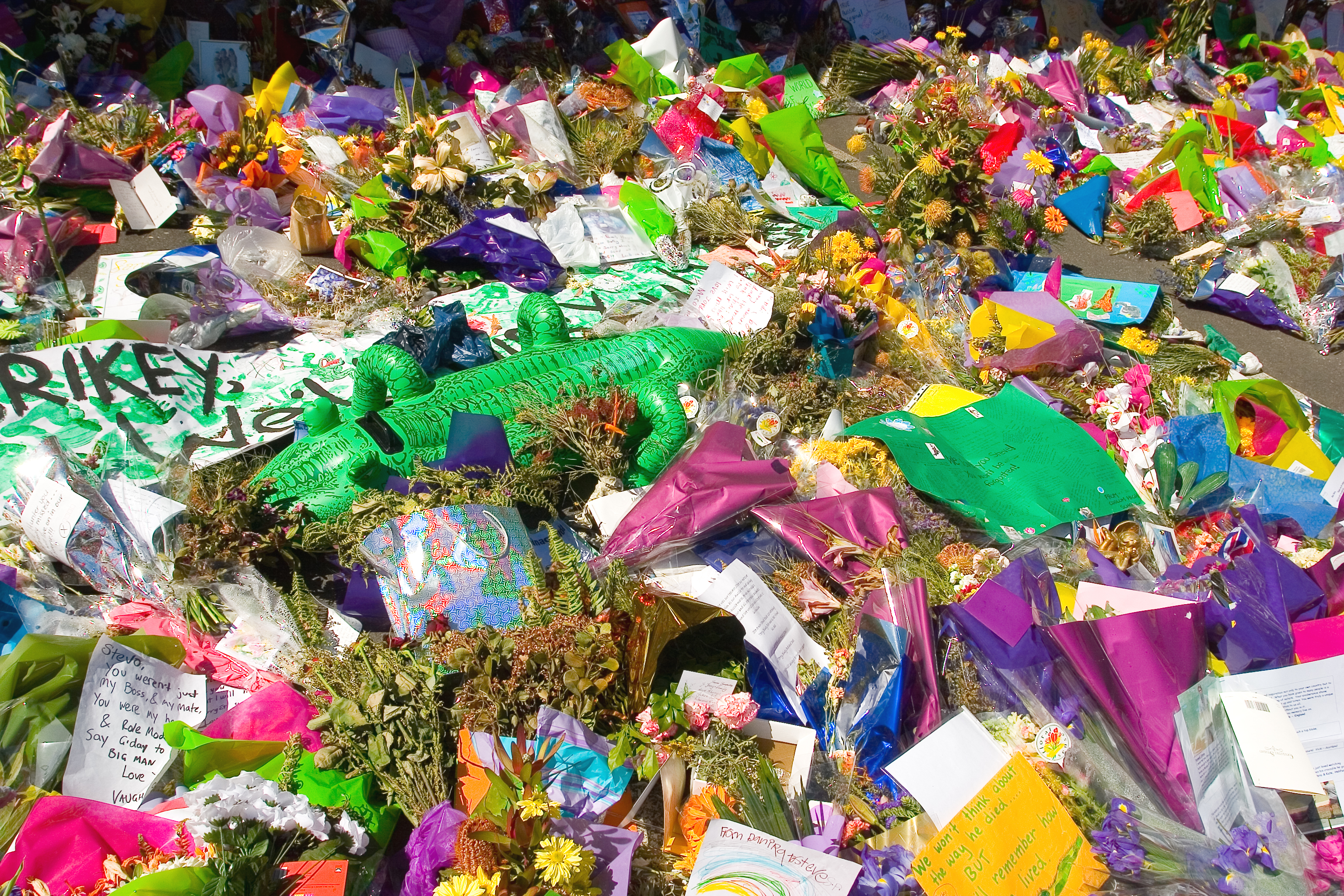
- A tribute left in Steve Irwin's memory the day after his death
- Date: 4 September 2006; 20 years ago
- Time: 12:53 p.m. AEST (UTC+10:00)
- Location: Batt Reef, Port Douglas, Queensland
- Cause: Pierced in the chest by a short-tail stingray during filming of Ocean's Deadliest
- Deaths: Steve Irwin

On 4 September 2006, Australian zookeeper, conservationist, and television programmer Steve Irwin was killed by a short-tail stingray while filming in the Great Barrier Reef. The stingray's barb pierced his chest, penetrating his thoracic wall, lungs and heart, causing massive trauma. He was at Batt Reef, near Port Douglas, Queensland, taking part in the production of an underwater documentary Ocean's Deadliest. During a lull in filming caused by inclement weather, Irwin decided to snorkel in shallow waters while being filmed in an effort to provide footage for Bindi the Jungle Girl, his daughter Bindi's television program.

Irwin's death is believed to be the only fatality from a stingray captured on video, although it has not been released to the public, and is one of the few human deaths from stingrays. Production of the documentary was completed and it was broadcast on the Discovery Channel four months after Irwin's death. The documentary was completed with footage shot in the weeks following the incident, but without including any mention of Irwin's death, aside from a tribute to Irwin at the end.

== Circumstances ==
While swimming in chest-deep water, 44-year-old Steve Irwin approached a stingray, with an approximate span of two metres (6 ft 7 in), from the rear, to film it swimming away. While the stingray has been described by most sources as a short-tail stingray, others have suggested that it may have been an Australian bull ray. The stingray, possibly mistaking Irwin's shadow for a tiger shark, suddenly "propped on its front" and stabbed Irwin several times with its tail. Irwin initially believed he had only a punctured lung; however, the stingray's barb pierced his heart, causing him to bleed to death. According to his cameraman and friend Justin Lyons, Irwin's final words came in response to him asking Irwin to think of his children, to "keep him fighting for his life". Irwin stated "I'm dying" and then passed out; never regaining consciousness. Crew members aboard Irwin's boat administered CPR and rushed him to the nearby Low Island, where medical staff pronounced him dead.

Irwin's widow, Terri, stated in an interview with Access Hollywood aired on 11 January 2014 that the documentary contains no footage that was shot the day he died, and that the footage of his injury and death had been destroyed. Justin Lyons, a cameraman for the documentary, has said that although footage of the incident does exist, he is against its release. Philippe Cousteau Jr. filmed the remainder of the documentary weeks after Irwin's death.

== Reactions ==
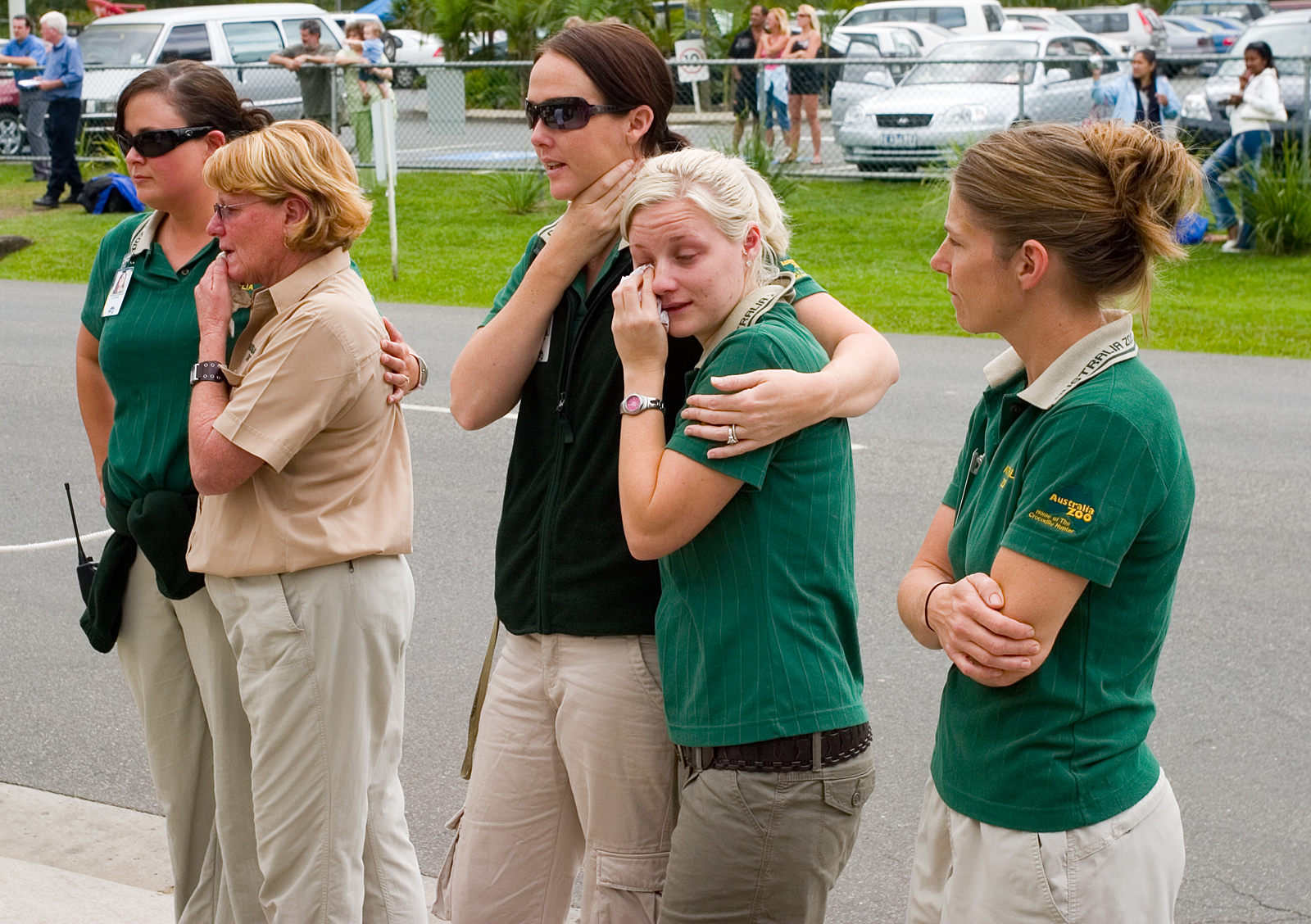
Australia Zoo employees mourning Irwin

News of Irwin's death prompted reactions around the world. Australian Prime Minister John Howard expressed "shock and distress" at Irwin's death, saying that "Australia has lost a wonderful and colourful son". Queensland's Premier Peter Beattie remarked that Irwin would "be remembered as not just a great Queenslander, but a great Australian". The Australian federal parliament opened on 5 September 2006 with condolence speeches by both Howard and the Leader of the Opposition, Kim Beazley. Flags at the Sydney Harbour Bridge were lowered to half-mast in honour of Irwin.

In the days following Irwin's death, reactions dominated Australian online news sources, talk-back radio programs, and television networks. In the United States, where Irwin had appeared in over 200 Discovery Network television programs, special tributes appeared on the Animal Planet channel, as well as on CNN and major networks. Thousands of fans visited Australia Zoo after his death, paying their respects and bringing flowers, candles, stuffed animals and messages of support.

== Funeral and memorial services ==
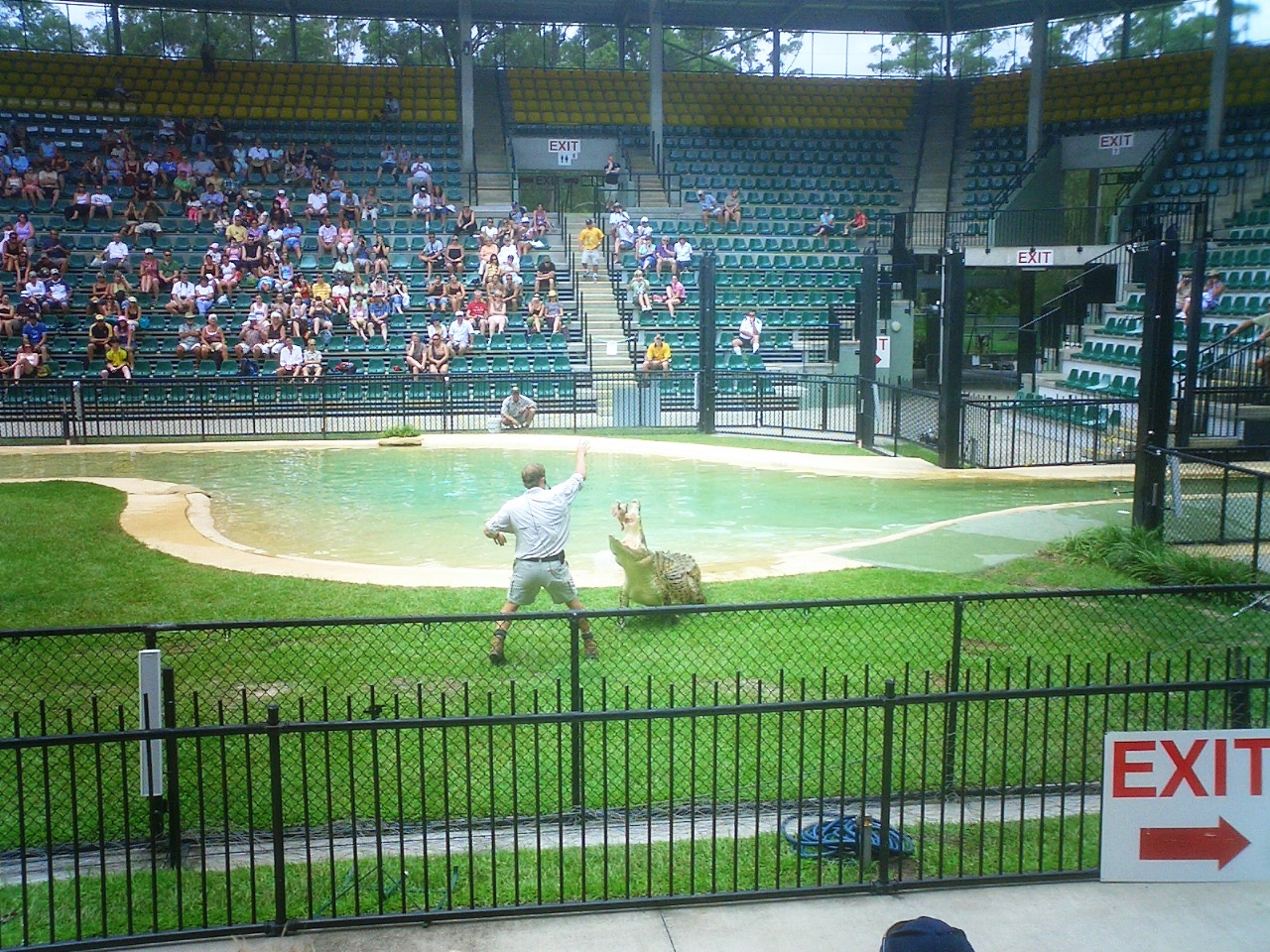
The Crocoseum at Australia Zoo, where Steve Irwin's memorial service was held

Family and friends of Irwin held a private funeral service in Caloundra on 9 September 2006. Irwin was buried in a private ceremony at Australia Zoo later that same day; the gravesite is inaccessible to zoo visitors. Prime Minister Howard and Queensland Premier Beattie had offered to hold a state funeral, but Irwin's family declined the offer; his father said that he would have preferred to be remembered as an "ordinary bloke".

On 20 September, a public memorial service, introduced by Russell Crowe, was held in Australia Zoo's 5,500-seat Crocoseum; this service was broadcast live throughout Australia, the United States, the United Kingdom, Germany, and Asia, and it is estimated to have been seen by over 300 million viewers worldwide. The memorial included remarks by Prime Minister Howard; Irwin's father Bob and daughter Bindi; his best friends and work associates Wes Mannion and John Stainton. In addition, pre-taped tributes from celebrities from Australia and abroad were shown throughout the ceremony, which included Hugh Jackman, Cameron Diaz, Justin Timberlake, Kevin Costner, Russell Crowe, David Wenham, Kelly Ripa, Larry King, and Anthony Field. Australian music star John Williamson sang "True Blue", which was Irwin's favourite song. In a symbolic finish to the service, Irwin's truck was loaded up with gear and driven out of the arena for the last time as Williamson sang. As a final tribute, Australia Zoo staff spelled out Irwin's catchphrase "Crikey" in yellow flowers as Irwin's truck was driven from the Crocoseum for the last time to end the service.

== Alleged related stingray abuse ==
In the weeks following Irwin's death, at least ten stingrays were found dead and mutilated on the beaches of Queensland, with their tails cut off, prompting speculation as to whether they might have been killed by fans of Irwin as an act of revenge; however, according to the chairperson of the Queensland fishing information service, anglers regularly cut the tails off to prevent anyone from getting stung.

Michael Hornby, a friend of Irwin and executive director of his Wildlife Warrior fund, condemned any revenge killings, saying, "We just want to make it very clear that we will not accept and not stand for anyone who's taken a form of retribution. That's the last thing Steve would want."

In an interview with Larry King, Irwin's daughter Bindi stated that she loved stingrays and did not feel bitterness towards them.

== See also ==
- List of entertainers who died during a performance
- List of unusual deaths in the 21st century
