= Port Douglas =

Port Douglas Jabulkanji (Kuku-Yalanji)
- Town
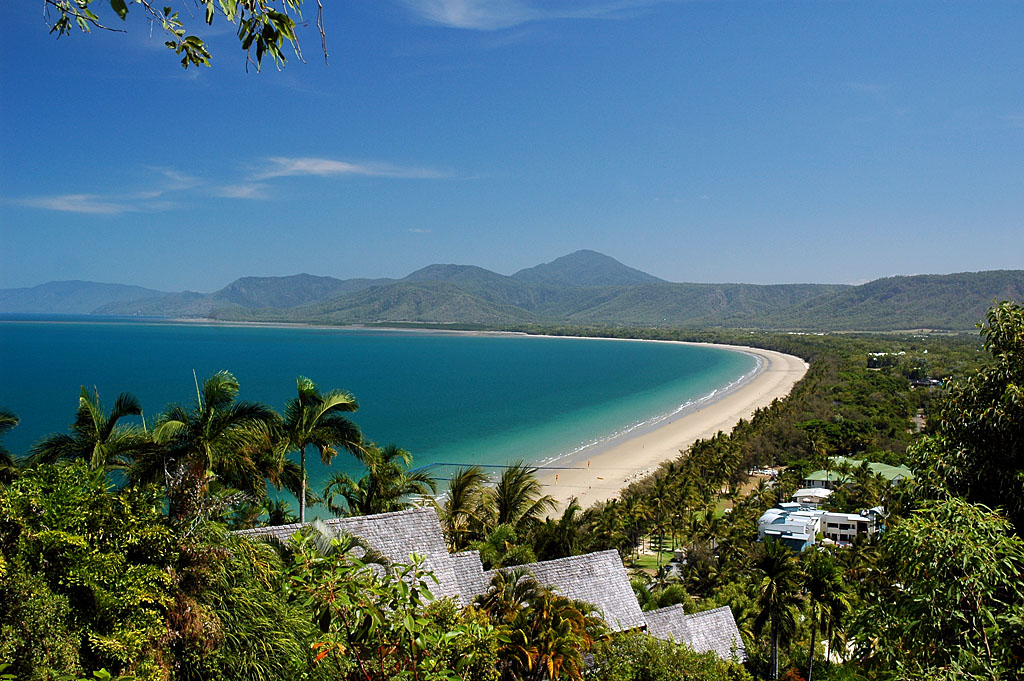
- Four Mile Beach

- Interactive map of Port Douglas
- Coordinates: 16.4834°S 145.4652°E
- Country: Australia
- State: Queensland
- LGA: Shire of Douglas
- Location: 21 km (13 mi) SE of Mossman; 68 km (42 mi) NNW of Cairns; 412 km (256 mi) NNW of Townsville; 1,746 km (1,085 mi) NNW of Brisbane
- Established: 1877

Government
  - State electorate: Cook
  - Federal division: Leichhardt

Area
  - Total: 18.0 km^{2} (6.9 sq mi)
- Elevation: 4 m (13 ft)

Population
  - Total: 3,650 (2021 census)
  - Density: 202.8/km^{2} (525.2/sq mi)
- Time zone: UTC+10:00 (AEST)
- Postcode: 4877
- County: Solander
- Mean max temp: 27.9 °C (82.2 °F)
- Mean min temp: 20.6 °C (69.1 °F)
- Annual rainfall: 2,032.4 mm (80.02 in)
Localities around Port Douglas
Killaloe	Coral Sea	Coral Sea
Killaloe	Port Douglas	Coral Sea
Craiglie	Craiglie	Craiglie

Port Douglas (Kuku-Yalanji: Jabulkanji) is a coastal town and locality in the Shire of Douglas, Queensland, Australia, approximately 60 km (37 mi) north of Cairns. In the 2021 census, the locality of Port Douglas had a population of 3,650 people. The town is situated adjacent to two World Heritage areas, the Great Barrier Reef and the Daintree Rainforest.

Port Douglas was originally established as a port town after the discovery of gold on the Hodgkinson goldfield in 1876 but developed as a tourist destination in the 1980s. It was named in honour of a former Premier of Queensland, John Douglas. Previous names for the town included Jabulkanji (in Kuku-Yalandji language), Terrigal, Island Point, Port Owen and Port Salisbury.

In 2026, it was listed as number 2 on Australian Traveller magazine's list of 100 Best Towns in Australia.

== History ==
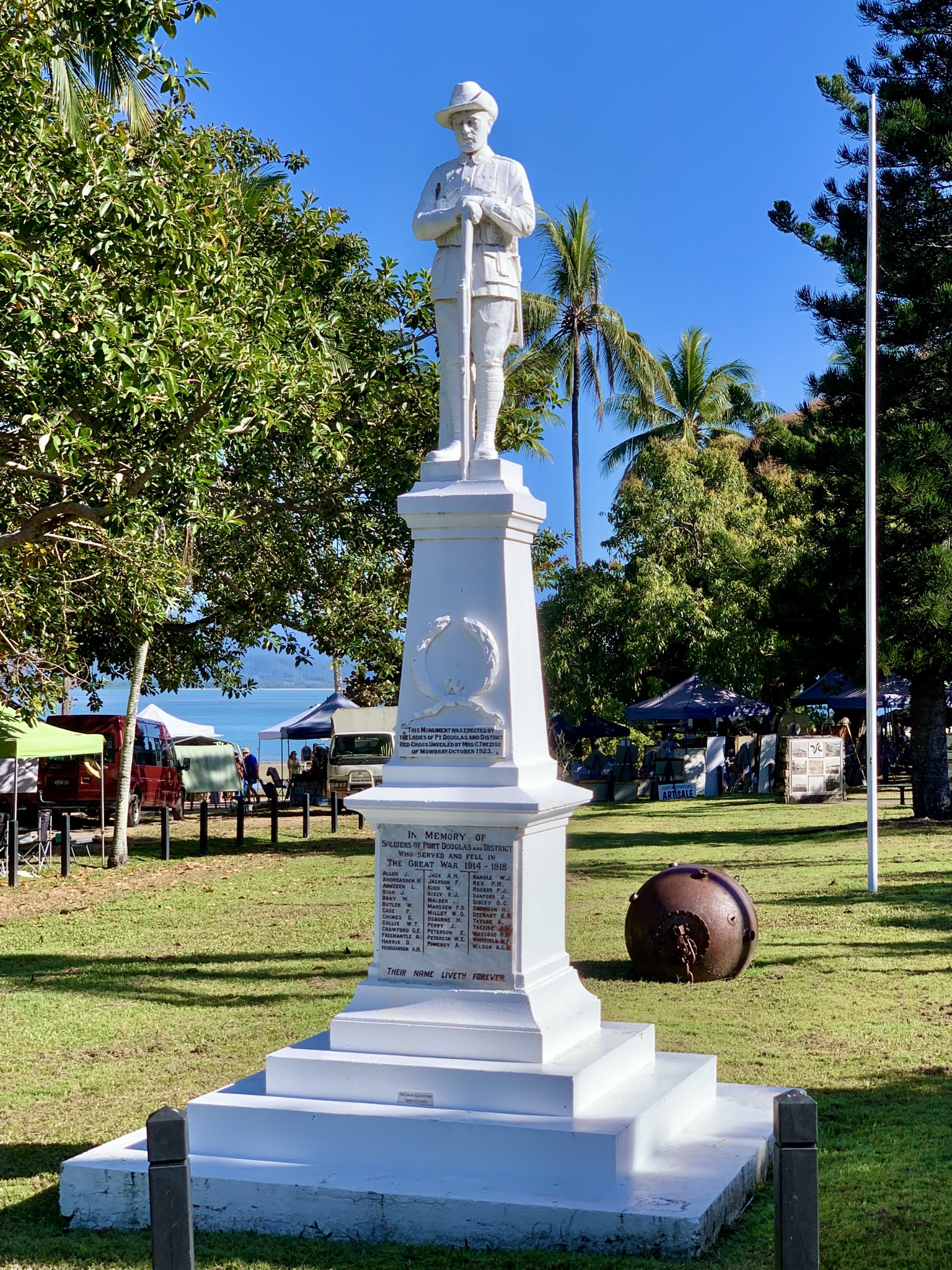
Port Douglas War Memorial, 2020

=== Establishment of township ===
The Port Douglas township was established following the discovery of gold on the Hodgkinson goldfield by James Venture Mulligan in 1876. Settlement of the wider region had been preceded by significant exploration, including Dalrymple's 1873 North-East Coast Exploring Expedition, which identified the Mossman and Daintree rivers and recorded "Island Point" as an early name for the future Port Douglas. With prospectors requiring a more direct route to the Hodgkinson goldfields than the existing road via Cooktown, Christie Palmerston blazed an overland track from Island Point to the goldfields in 1877. Known as the "Bump Track" it became the primary inland route and established Port Douglas as a key port in North Queensland.

The first tent town of prospectors at the site was documented on 16 June 1877, with the Post Office opening on 1 September later that year In November 1877, the township was officially named Port Douglas after Queensland Premier John Douglas having previously been known by at least five other names including Island Point, Port Owen and Port Salisbury. The town grew rapidly as the primary access port for the Hodgkinson goldfields, drawing businesses away from Cooktown, Smithfield and Cairns. By 1878 the population was approximately 400, with 18 licensed hotels and a wide range of trades and services established in the town. The Port Douglas State School was established on 11 November 1879.

In 1880, the discovery of tin at the Wild River in Herberton further enhanced Port Douglas's importance as a transport hub, with coach services operating to Herberton from 1882 under Cobb & Co. By 1880, 42 horse teamsters, 44 bullock teamsters and 29 packers were working the Bump Track route and the 1881 census recorded a population of 510.

=== Period of decline ===
Port Douglas's prominence began to decline in the 1880s after the severe wet season of 1882 rendered the Bump Track almost impassable, prompting the Queensland Government to investigate railway routes over the ranges. Cairns was selected as the rail terminus and, after the railway opened in 1891 and reached Mareeba in 1893, Port Douglas lost its status as the primary port for the Hodgkinson goldfields.

Port Douglas went into gradual decline while the nearby settlement of Mossman grew rapidly on the back of the sugar industry following the construction of the Mossman Central Mill. A tramway connecting Port Douglas to Mossman, completed in August 1900, initially sustained Port Douglas as a sugar export point, and an upgraded wharf completed in October 1905 was used for sugar transportation until 1958. However, as Mossman attracted businesses, migrant workers and administrative functions, Port Douglas's role contracted further.

The catastrophic cyclone of March 1911 demolished or severely damaged all but seven residential buildings and 4 commercial buildings, including the Wharf buildings (rebuilt), the Courthouse (rebuilt), the Catholic church (rebuilt) and Chinese temple (not rebuilt). Many residents chose not to rebuild and instead relocated to the more prosperous Mossman. The Port Douglas War Memorial was unveiled on 10 February 1923 by Mrs Tresize.

The region as a whole was significantly affected by World War II, with Four Mile Beach at Port Douglas used for military landing exercises. On 5 July 1943, a RAAF Vultee Vengeance (Serial Number A27–217) crash landed on the beach near Port Douglas. By the war's end, Mossman had firmly established itself as the district's dominant town, while Port Douglas remained a modest and declining settlement.

In the decades following World War II, the district's economy continued to be anchored by the Mossman-based sugar industry. Port Douglas remained a quiet fishing village through the 1950s and into the 1970s, with the local prawn fishing industry providing an important source of economic activity during this period. By 1961 Port Douglas's population had declined to 175 and the local school closed in 1962.

=== Post-1980s tourism boom ===
In the late-1980s, tourism boomed in the region after investor Christopher Skase financed the construction of the Sheraton Mirage Port Douglas Resort.

The Port Douglas State School was reopened on 23 January 1989.

In November 1996 United States President Bill Clinton and First Lady Hillary Clinton chose the town as their only holiday stop on their historic visit to Australia. When dining at a local restaurant they witnessed a couple's wedding certificate.

On a return visit on 11 September 2001, Bill Clinton was again dining at a local restaurant, when he was advised of the September 11 attacks. He returned to the United States the following day.

On 4 September 2006, television personality and conservationist Steve Irwin died at Batt Reef, off Port Douglas, after a stingray barb pierced his chest during filming of a documentary called The Ocean's Deadliest. Irwin was filmed snorkelling directly above the stingray when it lashed him with its tail, killing him almost immediately. The event was widely reported in Australia and overseas.

Although historically and currently Port Douglas is with the local government area of Shire of Douglas, between 2008 and 2013, it was within the Cairns Region following a local government amalgamation which was subsequently reversed following a vote by residents of the area.

Port Douglas was a popular location to view the 14 November 2012 solar eclipse at 6:38 am (local time). Many travelled to Port Douglas to see the phenomenon.

== Demographics ==
In the 2011 census, the locality of Port Douglas had a population of 3,205 people.

In the 2016 census, the locality of Port Douglas had a population of 3,504 people.

In the 2021 census, the locality of Port Douglas had a population of 3,650 people. 51.9% of people were born in Australia. The next most common countries of birth were England 6.7% and New Zealand 4.1%. 69.9% of people spoke only English at home. The most common responses for religion were No Religion, so described 46.7% and not stated 16.3%.

== Heritage listings ==
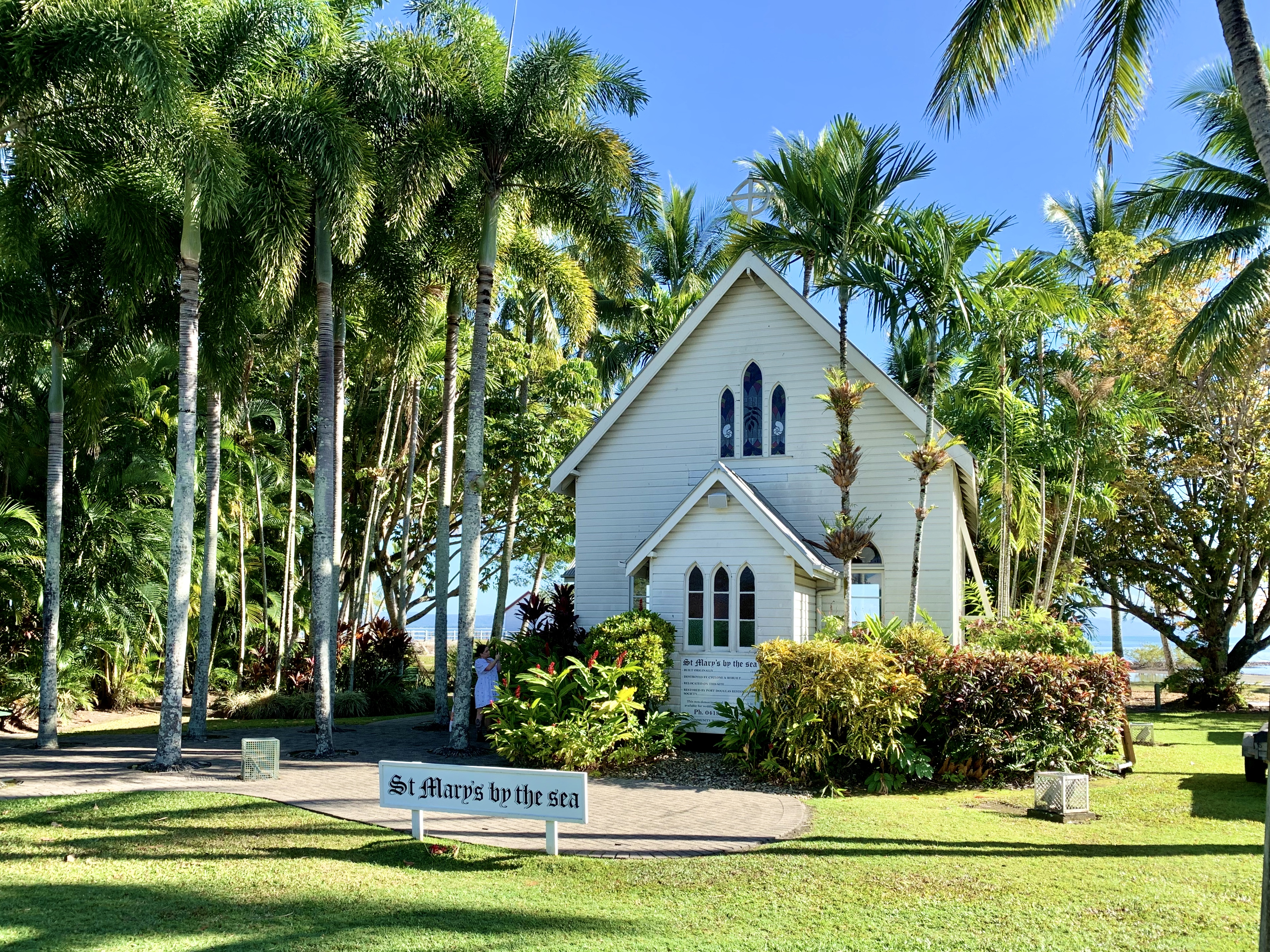
St Mary's by the Sea (former Catholic church, 1914–1988)

Port Douglas has a number of heritage-listed sites, including:

- Port Douglas Wharf, 6 Dixie Street
- FDA Carstens Memorial, Macrossan Street
- St Mary's by the Sea, Wharf Street
- Port Douglas Court House Museum, 25 Wharf Street

== Climate ==
Port Douglas has a tropical monsoon climate according to the Köppen climate classification (Am), with hot summers and warm winters, with heavy rainfall primarily from January–March, the wettest month of the year typically being February. The average temperature of the sea ranges from 23.7 °C (74.7 °F) in July to 29.5 °C (85.1 °F) in January.

Climate data for Port Douglas, Queensland
Month	Jan	Feb	Mar	Apr	May	Jun	Jul	Aug	Sep	Oct	Nov	Dec	Year
Mean daily maximum °C (°F)	30.3 (86.5)	30.1 (86.2)	29.5 (85.1)	28.3 (82.9)	26.7 (80.1)	25.1 (77.2)	24.6 (76.3)	25.3 (77.5)	26.7 (80.1)	28.3 (82.9)	29.5 (85.1)	30.3 (86.5)	27.9 (82.2)
Mean daily minimum °C (°F)	23.7 (74.7)	23.5 (74.3)	22.8 (73.0)	21.5 (70.7)	19.5 (67.1)	17.7 (63.9)	16.8 (62.2)	17.1 (62.8)	18.6 (65.5)	20.8 (69.4)	22.3 (72.1)	23.3 (73.9)	20.6 (69.1)
Average precipitation mm (inches)	401.6 (15.81)	429.7 (16.92)	425.6 (16.76)	204.8 (8.06)	70.8 (2.79)	47.3 (1.86)	25.6 (1.01)	24.1 (0.95)	32.0 (1.26)	52.0 (2.05)	107.9 (4.25)	213.2 (8.39)	2,032.4 (80.02)
Average precipitation days	15.5	15.9	16.1	13.3	9.8	7.0	5.5	5.2	5.4	6.4	9.0	11.7	120.8
Source: Bureau of Meteorology

=== Environmental challenges ===
Port Douglas is susceptible to extreme weather events such as cyclones and floods. These events can have immediate and severe impacts on critical infrastructure, including water supply systems. At the end of 2023, the town experienced critical water supply issues following the impact of Cyclone Jasper.

== Education ==
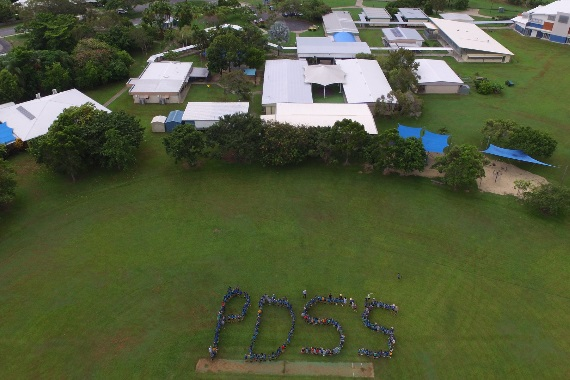
Port Douglas State School, 2025

Port Douglas State School is a government primary (Preparatory to Year 6) school for boys and girls at 4 Endeavour Street (16.5242°S 145.4612°E). In 2017, the school had an enrolment of 281 students with 20 teachers (17 full-time equivalent) and 12 non-teaching staff (8 full-time equivalent).

There are no secondary schools in Port Douglas. The nearest government secondary school is Mossman State High School in neighbouring Mossman to the north-west. There are also non-government schools in Mossman.

== Amenities ==
The Port Douglas Community Hall houses the Port Douglas Library, 11–29 Mowbray Street, operated by the Douglas Shire Council. The Library opened in 2010. Another branch library is located in Mossman.

The Port Douglas branch of the Queensland Country Women's Association meets at the CWA Hall at 8 Blake Street.

St Mary's Catholic Church is at 2 Endeavour Street. It is within the Mossman-Port Douglas Parish of the Roman Catholic Diocese of Cairns.

== Transport ==
Air travel is served by the nearest Cairns Airport which is about an hour drive from Port Douglas.

The town is along the Captain Cook Highway which links between Cairns and Mossman.

== Events ==
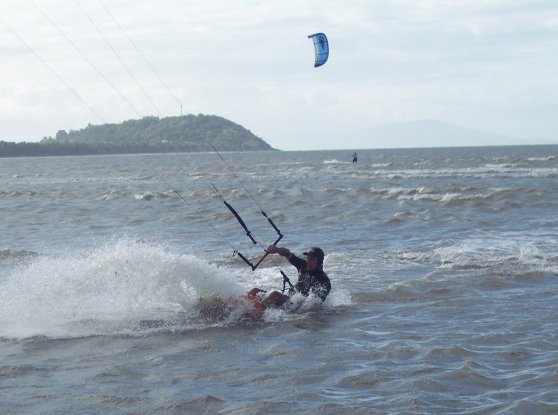
Kitesurfing at Port Douglas, Australia

The annual Port Douglas Carnivale is held in May and runs for 10 days over two weekends, beginning with a parade attracting over 10,000 people.

The Great Barrier Reef Marathon Festival is also held during October.

Each June the Captain Cook Highway is closed for a day to host the IRONMAN Triathlon, where cyclists race from the Cairns Esplanade to the outskirts of Port Douglas and back (a distance of 180 km).

== Attractions ==
Port Douglas is near the Great Barrier Reef and is home to Four mile beach, renowned for its four miles of golden sand and palm trees. Numerous companies run daily trips from the marina to the outer reef and the Low Isles for scuba diving and snorkelling. Port Douglas is also well known for its many restaurants, walks, golf courses, and five star resorts.

Nearby (25 km away) is Hartley's Crocodile Adventures, a wildlife park that displays crocodiles, tree-kangaroos, cassowaries, koalas, quolls, flying foxes and other native animals.

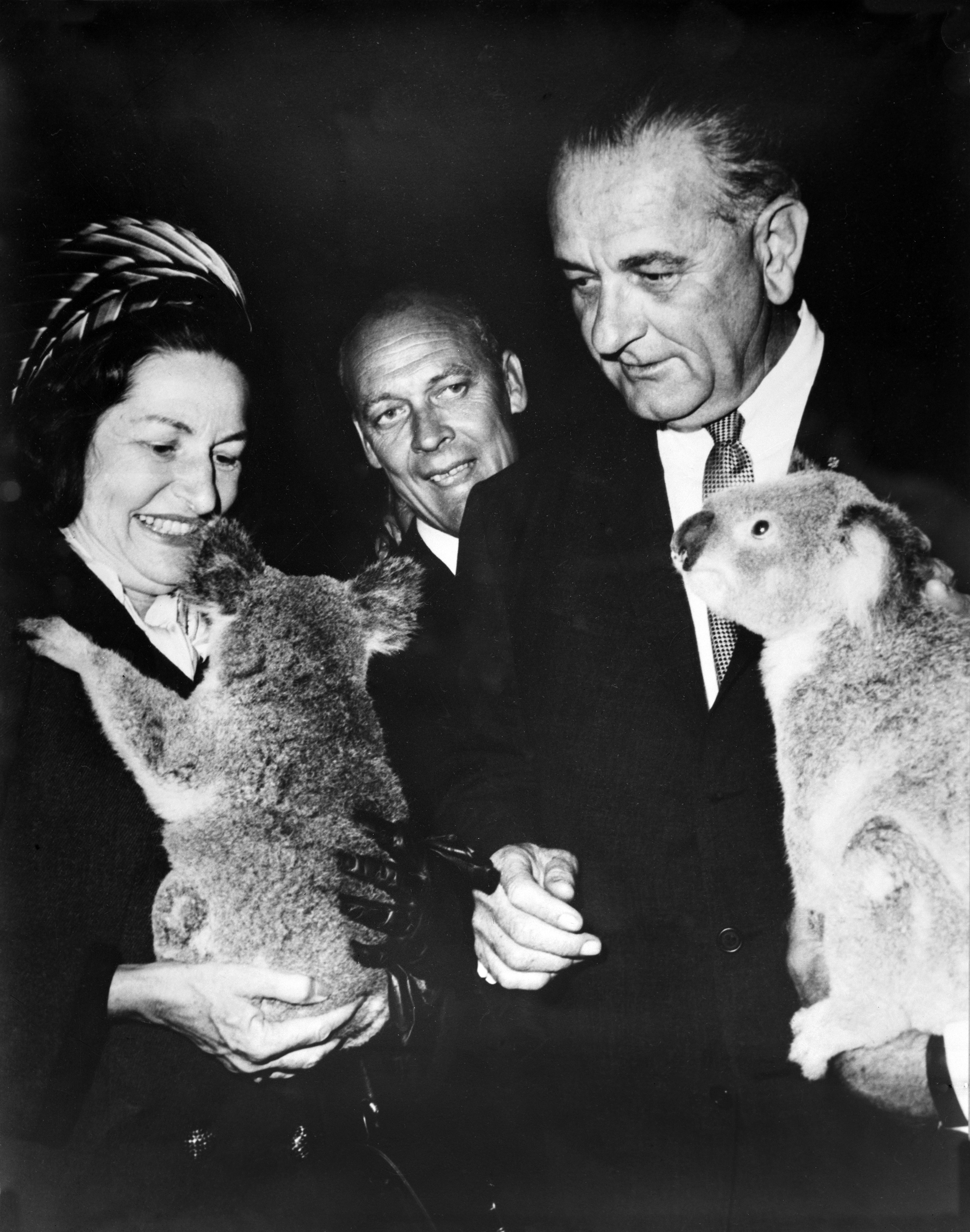
President of the United States Lyndon B. Johnson and Mrs Johnson with koalas, Port Douglas, 23 October 1966
