= Crikey! It's the Irwins =

2018–2022 Australian television series

- Genre: Reality television; Television documentary
- Starring: Terri Irwin; Bindi Irwin; Robert Irwin
- Countries of origin: Australia; United States
- Original language: English
- No. of seasons: 4
- No. of episodes: 49

Production
- Executive producers: Chris Culvenor; Paul Franklin; Wes Dening; Rod Parker; Rikki Proost
- Production locations: Beerwah, Queensland, Australia
- Running time: 1hr
- Production company: Eureka Productions

Original release
- Network: Animal Planet (seasons 1–2, 4) discovery+ (season 3); Discovery Channel (Shark Week special)
- Release: 28 October 2018 – 5 February 2022

Crikey! It's the Irwins is a reality television series starring Robert, Bindi and Terri Irwin. The series follows the family of Steve Irwin, and their work at the Australia Zoo. It premiered on 28 October 2018, on Animal Planet and ended on 22 February 2022.

On 28 May 2020, it was announced that the show was renewed for a third season, set to premiere later in the year, and that the show would be airing a special episode entitled "Life in Lockdown" showcasing how the COVID-19 pandemic in Australia had affected operations at Australia Zoo on 11 July. The third season premiered on 7 February 2021 on discovery+ with the premiere episode also airing on Animal Planet after the Puppy Bowl. The third season's linear airing on Animal Planet began on June 5, 2021. The fourth and final season premiered on 1 January 2022.

== Premise ==
Crikey! It's the Irwins follows the family of the late Australian conservationist and zookeeper Steve Irwin (aka "The Crocodile Hunter") as they live and work at the Australia Zoo. Cameras capture the family caring for all the zoo's animals as well as their home life.

== Cast ==
- Terri Irwin – Robert and Bindi Irwin's mother, Grace's grandmother and owner of Australia Zoo
- Bindi Irwin – Steve and Terri Irwin's daughter and Robert Irwin's older sister
- Robert Irwin – Steve and Terri Irwin's son and Bindi Irwin's younger brother
- Wes Mannion – Steve's best friend and Australia Zoo's director (seasons 1–3 only)
- Chandler Powell – Bindi's husband and Grace Warrior's father who also works at Australia Zoo
- Steve Irwin (archive footage) – Robert and Bindi's father and Terri's husband
- Grace Warrior Irwin Powell – Chandler Powell and Bindi Irwin's daughter and Robert Irwin's niece
- Dr. Rosemary Booth – Australia Zoo Wildlife Hospital Chief of Staff
- Dr. Sam Young – Head Zoo Veterinarian
- Luke Reavley – General Manager of Australia Zoo and former Irwin family assistant

== Episodes ==
| Series | Episodes | Originally released | | |
| Series | Episodes | First released | Last released | Network |
|---|---|---|---|---|
| 1 | 14 | 28 October 2018 | 27 January 2019 | Animal Planet |
| 2 | 12 | 5 October 2019 | 21 December 2019 | Animal Planet |
| 3 | 12 | 7 February 2021 | 18 April 2021 | discovery+ |
| 4 | 6 | 1 January 2022 | 5 February 2022 | Animal Planet |
| Specials | 5 | 5 October 2019 | 11 July 2021 | Animal Planet discovery+ Discovery Channel |

=== Season 1 (2018–19) ===
| No. overall | No. in season | Title | Original release date | U.S. viewers (millions) |
|---|---|---|---|---|
| 1 | 1 | "Steve's Legacy Continues" | 28 October 2018 | 1.07 |
After months of croc wrangling training with Steve Irwin's best friend Wes, Robert, Steve's son, takes the final step in his journey to feed Graham, a huge crocodile at the zoo's famous Crocoseum.
| 2 | 2 | "Tiger Eyes" | 4 November 2018 | 0.77 |
It's a big day for Hunter the Sumatran Tiger. He is blind and must be sedated for his annual eye check, so Terri can get closer than usual. The keepers prepare the young giraffe Scarlett for a road trip to South Australia, reuniting her with family.
| 3 | 3 | "Giraffe Road Trip" | 11 November 2018 | 0.72 |
Croc One, Steve Irwin's research ship, is prepared for a mission to release an endangered sea turtle back to the wild; Scarlett the giraffe is reunited back with her grandmother; Grub the wild echidna is released from the zoo's wildlife hospital.
| 4 | 4 | "Robert, King Of Cobras" | 18 November 2018 | 0.66 |
Robert wrangles a venomous 12-foot king cobra named Utah; Dr. Amber visits Tandora to care for wild koalas; back at the zoo, a past injury flares up for a brolga named Bruce, who has been in the Irwins' care for 26 years.
| 5 | 5 | "Bindi's Lemur Island" | 25 November 2018 | 0.62 |
The Australia Zoo's alligator snapping turtles need a wellness check-up, and it's Robert's job to make sure everyone is protected from their powerful bites; Terri and Bindi welcome seven new lemurs from the United States; the Rescue Unit must save possums caught in a chimney.
| 6 | 6 | "Irwin African Adventure" | 2 December 2018 | 0.67 |
The Irwins travel to South Africa. In South Africa, Terri helps release a wild leopard, Bindi learns from the all-female anti-poaching squad The Black Mambas, and Robert tries to photograph Africa's big five game animals.
| 7 | 7 | "It's a Baby Giraffe!" | 9 December 2018 | 0.69 |
Rosie the giraffe gets ready to give birth; Robert has a bloody encounter with a wild python that has entered another animal's enclosure; Terri helps the keepers wrangle a Tasmanian devil named Chief.
| 8 | 8 | "Robert's Baby Kangaroo" | 16 December 2018 | 0.58 |
Bindi and some of the other keepers ready Sophie the Baby Giraffe for her first steps into her enclosure; Robert helps to hand-raise Melman the Kangaroo; Terri oversees a health check for Ravi the Red Panda.
| 9 | 9 | "Race to Save the Platypus" | 23 December 2018 | 0.65 |
Terri helps welcome Mballa, a new cheetah cub from South Africa, to the Australia Zoo family; Robert tries to save a stranded platypus, and Bindi prepares to meet Bert the Koala Joey as he emerges from his mother's pouch for the first time.
| 10 | 10 | "Bindi & the Otters" | 30 December 2018 | 0.69 |
Wes and Robert remove eggs from the nest of Terra and Bosco, two saltwater crocodiles, in a nerve-wracking but necessary venture; Bindi tends to the training of otters Percival and Daisy; Terri makes a zoo volunteer's dream come true.
| 11 | 11 | "Swimming With Manta Rays" | 6 January 2019 | 0.76 |
Robert travels to Australia's Great Barrier Reef to help conduct research on manta rays; the Zoo's Rescue Unit, Wildlife Hospital, and volunteers team up to save a baby wallaby struggling to survive.
| 12 | 12 | "Pawing Terri's Heart" | 13 January 2019 | 0.62 |
Terri attends the exam of a tiger named Charlie to determine if his tumors were successfully treated; Bindi and the Small Mammal Team help develop a vaccine for a Tasmanian devil named Eden; Robert discovers the true sexes of the zoo's shingleback lizards.
| 13 | 13 | "Tortoise First Date" | 20 January 2019 | 0.54 |
Terri helps determine if a rhino named Caballe is pregnant, while Robert hopes to get the zoo's Aldabra giant tortoises to mate.
| 14 | 14 | "Steve's Croc Mission Lives On" | 27 January 2019 | 0.60 |
The Irwin family makes the annual trip to the Steve Irwin Wildlife Reserve to capture, study, and release wild crocodiles, a mission started by Steve and Terri that provides research vital to the protection of Australia's apex predators.

=== Season 2 (2019) ===
| No. overall | No. in season | Title | Original release date | U.S. viewers (millions) |
|---|---|---|---|---|
| 15 | 1 | "Bosco the Croc's Big Move" | 5 October 2019 | 0.56 |
Robert takes on the challenging task of relocating Bosco, the most aggressive croc at the zoo; Bindi must investigate Forest the giraffe's bad knee problem; Terri helps Harley the koala find love at the end of a difficult breeding season.
| 16 | 2 | "Robert's Python Swim" | 12 October 2019 | 0.63 |
Robert gets in the water with Gloria, a 12-foot reticulated python, to swim alongside her for the first time in the Crocoseum; Bindi welcomes home two orphaned kangaroo joeys; Terri helps release a rescued wedge-tailed eagle back into the wild.
| 17 | 3 | "Road Trip Rescue" | 19 October 2019 | 0.48 |
Carrying three baby kangaroos and an emu, the Irwins caravan into the Australian Outback to release the animals on Mourachan, their giant wildlife conservation property; plans shift when they discover more animals in need of rescue along the way.
| 18 | 4 | "Big Day for Baby Rhino" | 26 October 2019 | 0.47 |
Terri helps prepare the zoo's new baby rhino to receive a lifesaving vaccine; Robert is on a rescue mission to save two black swans in very bad shape; Bindi tries to determine if a cranky wombat named Poa might be pregnant.
| 19 | 5 | "Crocodile Love Story" | 2 November 2019 | 0.50 |
It's moving day for Acco, the zoo's biggest crocodile; all goes to plan until his mate Cassie goes into hiding as the team races to reunite the bonded pair in their new enclosure; the rescue unit fights to save a flying fox entangled in barbed wire.
| 20 | 6 | "Oscar the Grouchy Frogmouth" | 9 November 2019 | 0.58 |
Terri returns to her hometown in Oregon to help Brady, a cougar in need of a vital health check. At the zoo, Robert is on a mission to rescue Oscar, a small bird with a big attitude, and Bindi bathes an echidna with bad skin allergies.
| 21 | 7 | "Swimming With Steve" | 16 November 2019 | 0.44 |
Bindi swims alongside whale sharks, assisting with research efforts on the world's largest and least understood fish. Robert works to save an echidna that's tightly trapped under a fridge. Terri joins a closeup exam on a grizzly.
| 22 | 8 | "Robert Trains A Dragon" | 23 November 2019 | 0.48 |
Robert and Indah, a Komodo dragon, participate in an exciting research experiment. Terri tries to save a koala joey with a zero percent chance of survival. Bindi visits friends at childhood favorite spot Oregon Coast Aquarium.
| 23 | 9 | "Roberts Alligator Feeding Frenzy" | 30 November 2019 | 0.47 |
Robert feeds 44 hungry alligators, all at the same time. Terri helps examine Kaitlyn the tiger and makes a thrilling discovery, while Bindi follows the heartbreaking story of her old friend, Zambezi the zebra.
| 24 | 10 | "Turtles Take Flight" | 14 December 2019 | 0.59 |
Robert and Terri take to the skies to release three rescued sea turtles near the Great Barrier Reef. Bindi anxiously awaits the birth of the zoo's first tiger cub in years. Richie helps a baby wallaby in his struggle for survival.
| 25 | 11 | "Robert and the Rattlesnakes" | 21 December 2019 | 0.46 |
Robert wrangles Western Diamondback rattlesnakes in Arizona for the first time, learning techniques passed down by his dad. Terri helps save some of the hospital's tiniest patients: three baby feathertail gliders. Bindi chats with Occa the cockatoo.
| 26 | 12 | "Bindi Says Yes" | 21 December 2019 | 0.46 |
As Bindi celebrates her 21st birthday, she gets a surprise proposal from her boyfriend, Chandler. Meanwhile, things get dangerous as Robert wrangles gators in thick mud. Terri helps with the momentous birth of a baby white rhino.

=== Season 3 (2021) ===
| No. overall | No. in season | Title | Original release date | U.S. viewers (millions) |
|---|---|---|---|---|
| 27 | 1 | "Australia Zoo Begins Again (Note: Episode was titled "First Look: New Start" on Animal Planet.)" | 7 February 2021 | 1.05 |
After the Queensland Government clears Australia Zoo to reopen, the staff works to prepare the zoo for guests to return. The Wildlife Hospital has to treat multiple corellas who ingested poisoned birdseed. Terri becomes a foster mother to a red-necked wallaby. Kaitlyn the Sumatran tiger gives birth to a litter of triplets.
| 28 | 2 | "Tiger Triplets" | 7 February 2021 (discovery+); 12 June 2021 (Animal Planet) | 0.35 |
With the Crocoseum set to reopen, Chandler prepares for his first death roll demonstration after Robert injures his shoulder prepares. Daniel, a red-necked wallaby Terri is fostering, develops Candida and Clostridia infections. The three newly born tiger cubs receive their first checkup.
| 29 | 3 | "Bushfire Rescue" | 14 February 2021 (discovery+); 19 June 2021 (Animal Planet) | 0.34 |
In the wake of the 2019–20 Australian bushfire season, the wildlife hospital sees a massive influx of injured animals including a camp of flying fox pups. Terri, Robert and Luke travel to Kangaroo Island to care for burned koalas.
| 30 | 4 | "A Baby Giraffe's Tall Order" | 21 February 2021 (discovery+); 26 June 2021 (Animal Planet) | 0.36 |
Rosie the giraffe gives birth to a calf named Talbert, who struggles to stand. Robert and Renee rescue a black swan entangled in fishing line. Bindi and Chandler prepare birthday presents for Kingston the southern white rhinoceros.
| 31 | 5 | "Wildlife Hospital Warriors" | 28 February 2021 (discovery+); 3 July 2021 (Animal Planet) | 0.41 |
Terri and Bindi work with the Wildlife Hospital to help rehabilitate an injured sea turtle and a koala with Chlamydia. Robert and Chandler ride with the rescue unit and rescue a brown goshawk and a carpet python that were struck by cars.
| 32 | 6 | "Double Puggle" | 7 March 2021 (discovery+); 19 February 2022 (Animal Planet) | 0.38 |
Quill the echidna puggle develops a coccidia infection, while another puggle is brought to the Wildlife Hospital after being found in a puddle. Douglas the jabiru trains for the bird show at the Crocoseum. A pair of elongated tortoises arrive at Australia Zoo. Robert learns to drive in his father's ute.
| 33 | 7 | "Robert And Big Bad Bosco" | 14 March 2021 (discovery+); 26 February 2022 (Animal Planet) | 0.32 |
Clare the koala develops a Chlamydia infection in her eye. Bosco the crocodile is moved to the Crocoseum. Terri and the giraffe keepers attempt to measure Forest the giraffe to find out if he is the tallest living giraffe in captivity.
| 34 | 8 | "Bindi's Croc Trip Surprise" | 21 March 2021 (discovery+); 5 March 2022 (Animal Planet) | 0.33 |
The Irwins are on their yearly trip to the Steve Irwin Wildlife Reserve to study crocodiles. The Irwins find signs of gillnetting within the reserve. Robert is placed in charge of capturing a wild crocodile for the first time. Bindi and Chandler announce that they are expecting.
| 35 | 9 | "Komodo Connection" | 28 March 2021 (discovery+); 18 December 2021 (Animal Planet) | 0.18 |
Bindi and Chandler travel to Lady Elliot Island to study the effects of coral bleaching on the Great Barrier Reef. Gili the Komodo dragon is introduced as a potential mate to Indah. A stick is removed from the neck of Jessie the woma python.
| 36 | 10 | "Backyard Croc Rescue" | 4 April 2021 (discovery+); 18 December 2021 (Animal Planet) | 0.21 |
Four Sumatran elephants arrive at Australia Zoo. Robert and Toby rescue a saltwater crocodile from a backyard. 40 Gouldian finches are released into the aviary Australia Zoo. Terri and Robert attempt to guess the sex of Bindi and Chandler’s baby using meerkats, dogs and binturongs.
| 37 | 11 | "Nothing Stops Bindi" | 11 April 2021 (discovery+); 25 December 2021 (Animal Planet) | 0.23 |
Robert works to train Oberon the alligator for the Crocoseum after Andre retires. Six cassowary eggs are laid; however, none of them end up being fertile. Bindi works at the Wildlife Hospital during trauma season in the final weeks before her daughter's due date and treats a pheasant coucal and a striped marsh frog.
| 38 | 12 | "Stormin' Norman" | 18 April 2021 (discovery+); 25 December 2021 (Animal Planet) | 0.24 |
Norman the saltwater crocodile develops a tumor in his jaw and is later euthanised. The tiger triplets are prepared to be moved into a new enclosure with their older brother Nelson. Five koalas injured in recent wildfires at Kangaroo Island are brought to Australia Zoo.

=== Season 4 (2022) ===
| No. overall | No. in season | Title | Original release date | U.S. viewers (millions) |
|---|---|---|---|---|
| 39 | 1 | "Robert's Great Gator Challenge" | 1 January 2022 | 0.38 |
Robert and the reptile team relocate ten large alligators from Australia Zoo to a new facility at Australian Reptile Park. A new pathway to a new display habitat is built for the Sumatran elephants, and Terri works to ensure that the elephants do not become spooked along the path. Koala breeding season starts; however, one new joey is underdeveloped while Cedar develops a terminal infection.
| 40 | 2 | "Bad Boy Bunker" | 8 January 2022 | 0.29 |
In a world first, Bunker the wombat is given a testosterone suppressant. A new enclosure is built for Nicki the green anaconda. After a hail storm, the Wildlife Hospital sees an influx of injured rainbow lorikeets. Robert and Chandler prepare an afternoon tea for Terri and Bindi complete with a crocodile cake.
| 41 | 3 | "Terri's Wonder Wallaby" | 15 January 2022 | 0.31 |
Daniel the red-necked wallaby has an accident that leads to a spinal injury. Robert and Chandler travel to Snakes Down Under Reptile Park and Zoo to bring a new male mate for Indah the Komodo dragon back to Australia Zoo. Bindi checks in on Talbert the giraffe calf.
| 42 | 4 | "The Puggle Struggle" | 22 January 2022 | 0.35 |
An influx of orphaned echidna puggles arrive at Australia Zoo, and one has a problem toileting. Coco the koala is struggling to eat. Billy the hawksbill sea turtle undergoes endoscopic surgery after swallowing fishing hooks. Robert and Chandler bake a cake for Minibus the wombat's 26th birthday.
| 43 | 5 | "Tiny but Poisonous" | 29 January 2022 | 0.50 |
Terri leads the effort to move Bosco the saltwater crocodile to a new pond and move Casper and Wendy to the Crocoseum. A yellow-bellied glider is admitted to the Wildlife Hospital after getting caught in barbed wire. 15 poison dart frogs arrive at Australia Zoo.
| 44 | 6 | "Grace's Garden" | 5 February 2022 | 0.39 |
The aviary undergoes renovation, so 150 birds have to be moved. Bindi is put in charge of hand-raising Bonnie, an orphaned common ringtail possum. Casper the leucistic saltwater crocodile makes his debut at the Crocoseum.

=== Specials (2019–21) ===
| No. overall | No. in season | Title | Original release date | U.S. viewers (millions) |
|---|---|---|---|---|
| 1 | 1 | "Crikey! It's A Lookback" | 5 October 2019 | N/A |
The Irwins discuss their five favourite moments from the first season of Crikey! It's The Irwins.
| 2 | 2 | "Crikey! It's The Irwins: Bindi's Wedding" | 18 April 2020 | 0.94 |
Bindi and Chandler prepare for their wedding at Australia Zoo but have to change their plans after Prime Minister Scott Morrison announces restrictions to curb the COVID-19 pandemic.
| 3 | 3 | "Life In Lockdown" | 11 July 2020 | 0.55 |
After the COVID-19 pandemic lockdown begins following Bindi and Chandler's wedding, Terri has to lead a skeleton staff to keep 1,200 animals fed while Australia Zoo is closed. The Wildlife Hospital, after having a recent influx of arrivals due to the 2019–20 Australian bushfire season, remains busy after lockdown. Robert and Renee rescue a carpet python with jaw trauma while on the Rescue Unit. Chandler prepares a surprise picnic for Bindi after the two cancel their honeymoon.
| 4 | 4 | "Crikey! It's A Baby" | 25 April 2021 | 0.50 |
The Irwins prepare for the arrival of Bindi and Chandler's daughter. Bindi volunteers at the Wildlife Hospital for the last time while pregnant. Robert and the rescue team travels to Noosa Beach after a whale shark pup becomes stranded in the breakers. A baby shower is thrown for Bindi. Grace Warrior Irwin Powell is born on 25 March 2021.
| 5 | 5 | "Crikey! It's Shark Week" | 11 July 2021 | 1.09 |
Robert travels with conservationists Paul de Gelder and Madison Stewart to learn about sharks before his first dive with a great white shark.

== See also ==
- List of Animal Planet original programming
