= Chandler Powell =

American and Australian conservationist (born 1996)

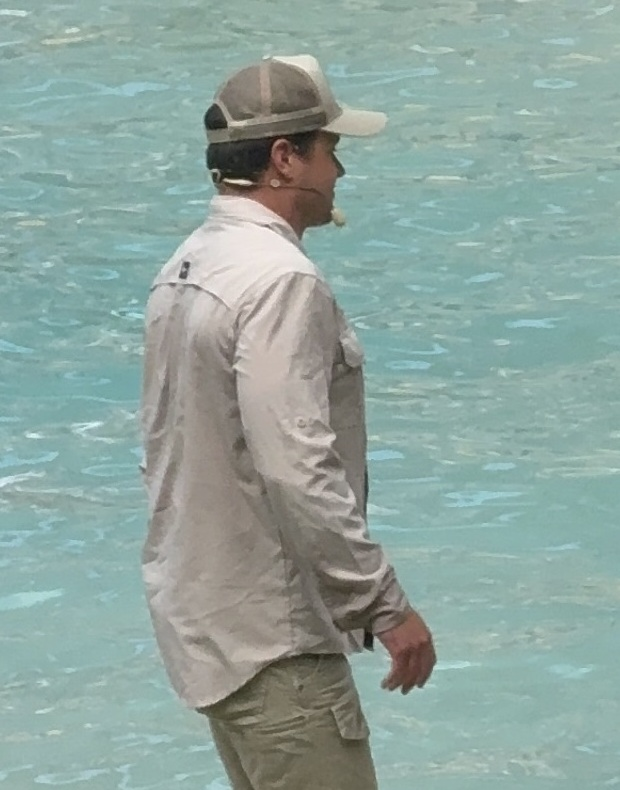
- Powell in 2026
- Born: Chandler Joseph Powell; November 14, 1996 (age 30); Seffner, Florida, U.S.
- Citizenship: United States; Australia
- Education: Strawberry Crest High School; University of Central Florida
- Occupations: Conservationist; zookeeper; television personality; wakeboarder
- Years active: 2009–2016 (wakeboarding); 2015–present (conservation)
- Spouse: Bindi Irwin (m. 2020)
- Children: 1
- Website: australiazoo.com.au

Chandler Joseph Powell (born November 14, 1996) is an American-Australian conservationist and former professional wakeboarder. Born and raised in Florida, he is a part of the management team at Australia Zoo in Beerwah, Queensland, and is married to its chief executive officer, Bindi Irwin.

== Early life and education ==
Chandler Joseph Powell was born on November 14, 1996, in Seffner, Florida, to Christopher and Shannan Powell. His father was one of the first professional kneeboarders to enter and compete in a ski board competition. During his early childhood, Powell embarked on an amateur career in skateboarding. He participated in events held at the Skatepark of Tampa and earned sponsorships from Airwalk and Powell Peralta. Because there was no youth division at the time, he primarily competed against teenagers.

After Powell's skateboarding career ended when he was seven years old, he played soccer for local clubs in Brandon. He graduated from the International Baccalaureate program at Strawberry Crest High School with a grade point average of 6.2 in 2015. He then studied marketing with a minor in international business at the University of Central Florida.

== Career ==
Powell became interested in wakeboarding when he was twelve years old after attending a contest in Orlando with his father. He began entering professional competitions in 2012 and finished in the top ten of that year's Monster Energy Wake Park Triple Crown. In September 2014, he won the Wake Park Triple Crown in the professional men's features category. Powell became sponsored by several companies such as Liquid Force, and was named a global ambassador for the non-profit organization Wildlife Warriors. Throughout his career, he competed in China, the Philippines, the United Arab Emirates, Australia and Thailand.

Powell continued competing in the WWA Wake Park World Series until his retirement in 2016. He relocated to Queensland, Australia two years later amidst his romantic relationship with conservationist Bindi Irwin. He became part of the managerial team at Australia Zoo and was featured on the Animal Planet television series Crikey! It's the Irwins (2018–2022) alongside Irwin's family.

== Personal life ==
Powell met Bindi Irwin, the daughter of conservationists Steve and Terri Irwin, at Australia Zoo in November 2013, and they started dating two years later. He proposed on her twenty-first birthday, and they were married on March 25, 2020, in a private ceremony at the zoo. Five months later, Powell and Irwin announced that they were expecting their first child. Their daughter, Grace Warrior Irwin Powell, was born on their first wedding anniversary.

The couple live on the private grounds of Australia Zoo with Irwin's family. Powell became a naturalized citizen of Australia on February 27, 2026, at Australia Zoo's Crocoseum.
