= Bindi's Bootcamp =

- Genre: Children's game show
- Presented by: Bindi Irwin
- Country of origin: Australia
- Original language: English
- No. of seasons: 2
- No. of episodes: 31

Production
- Executive producers: Donna Andrews; Justine Flynn; Bob Higgins; Sander Schwartz; Bill Davison; Geoff Cooper
- Production locations: Australia Zoo, Queensland
- Running time: 25 minutes
- Production companies: Sticky Pictures; FremantleMedia Australia

Original release
- Network: ABC3
- Release: 7 July 2012 – 29 October 2015

Bindi's Bootcamp is an Australian children's game show television series aired on ABC3 on 7 July 2012 until 29 October 2015. It was hosted by Bindi Irwin, the daughter of Steve Irwin.

Set at Bindi Irwin's home, Australia Zoo, each episode sees three teams of two bootcampers have their knowledge, inner strength and stamina tested as they compete in wildlife-based challenges with the aim of making it into the Grand Final and being named 'Bindi's Wildlife Warriors'.

Challenges are grouped into several categories such as Gross Island, Dangerous Dash and Zoom Through The Zoo. Some challenges, such as "Whose Poo Is Who", were designed by Bindi's brother Robert.

In 2012, Bindi and Robert opened the Bootcamp Playground from the show as an attraction in Australia Zoo, including several challenges seen on the show.

== Production ==
The show was announced by British production & distribution company FremantleMedia under its production & distribution division FremantleMedia Enterprises via its kids & family division in October 2010, when FremantleMedia Enterprises announced its kids & family production state & partnered with Australian animation & live-action studio Sticky Pictures (formerly an animation company before merging with live-action outfit Buster Dandy Productions in January of that year) to produce an Australian unscripted television series starring Bindi Irwin the daughter of Steve Irwin with FremantleMedia's Australian division FremantleMedia Australia producing alongside Sticky Pictures with FremantleMedia Enterprises' president of kids & family division Sander Schwartz and vice president of kids & family Bob Higgins executive producing alongside Sticky Pictures' founder Donna Andrews and head of live-action & former Buster Dandy Productions' co-founder Justine Flynn.

One year later in late-November 2011, Australian broadcaster Australian Broadcasting Corporation had ordered the wildlife television series now entitled Bindi's Bootcamp on its children's channel ABC3.

== See also ==
- List of programs broadcast by Animal Planet
