= Wildlife Warriors (album) =

Compilation album by John Williamson
- Released: 25 November 2006
- Recorded: 1982–2006
- Label: EMI Music
- Producer: John Williamson

John Williamson chronology
The Platinum Collection (2006)	Wildlife Warriors (2006)	Quambatook (2008)

Singles from Wildlife Warriors
- 1. "Wildlife Warriors - It's Time" Released: November 2006

Wildlife Warriors (subtitled It's Time) is a compilation album by Australian country music artist John Williamson. The album was released in November 2006 following the death of Steve Irwin and contains important environmental songs; many of which inspirations to Irwin. A$1 from each sale was donated to the Wildlife Warriors conservation foundation, a charity founded by Steve and Terri Irwin. Williamson said "[Steve] was a loud, proud Aussie who promoted the wonders of our ancient land with incredible enthusiasm. So if my new CD helps raise more awareness for the Wildlife Warriors' cause, that's great!" The album includes two live recording from Irwin's memorial. The album, peaked at number 78 on the ARIA Charts. The album was supported with a "Wildlife Warrior Tour" across Australia in 2007.

== Track listing ==
No.	Title	Writer(s)	Length
1.	"Wildlife Warriors: It's Time"	John Williamson
2.	"Rip Rip Woodchip"	Williamson
3.	"Dingo"	Williamson
4.	"Humpin' My Bluey"	Williamson
5.	"It's a Way of Life"	Williamson
6.	"Send Down the Rain"	Williamson
7.	"Goodbye Blinky Bill" (with Bullamakanka and Ami & George Williamson)	Williamson
8.	"Koala Koala"	Williamson
9.	"A Thousand Feet" (with Warren H. Williams)	Williamson
10.	"Ancient Mountains"	Williamson
11.	"River Crying Out"	Williamson
12.	"Rosewood Hill"	Williamson
13.	"Home Among The Gum Trees" (recorded live at Steve Irwin's memorial)	Wally Johnson, Bob Brown
14.	"True Blue" (recorded live at Steve Irwin's memorial)	Williamson
15.	"The Trees Have Now Gone"	Williamson

== Charts ==
=== Weekly charts ===
Chart (2006)	Peak position
Australian Albums (ARIA)	78

=== Year-end charts ===
Chart (2006)	Position
ARIA Country Albums (ARIA)	29

== Release history ==
Country	Date	Format	Label	Catalogue
Australia	25 November 2006	CD; download	EMI Music	3826912
