= Bindi Irwin =

Australian conservationist (born 1998)

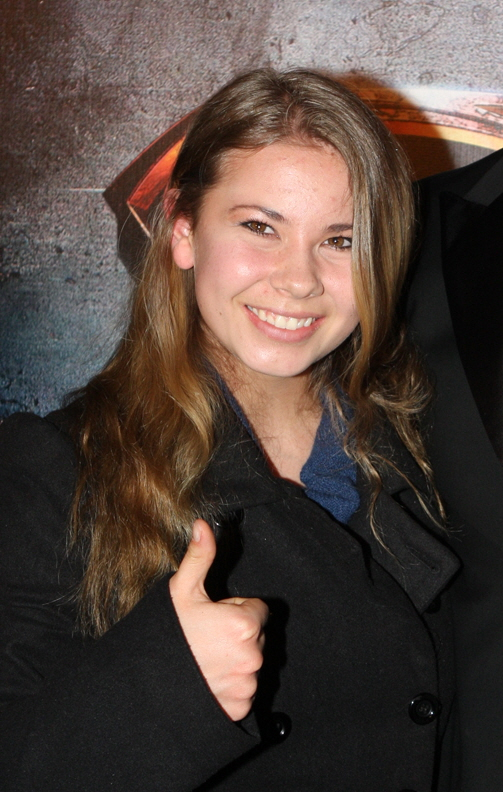
- Irwin in 2013
- Born: Bindi Sue Irwin; 24 July 1998 (age 28); Buderim, Queensland, Australia
- Citizenship: Australia; United States
- Education: TAFE Queensland East Coast
- Occupations: Conservationist; zookeeper; actress; author; singer; television presenter; businesswoman
- Years active: 1999–present
- Spouse: Chandler Powell (m. 2020)
- Children: 1
- Parents: Steve Irwin (father); Terri Irwin (mother)
- Relatives: Robert Irwin (brother); Bob Irwin (grandfather)
- Website: australiazoo.com.au

Bindi Sue Irwin (/bɪn.di/; born 24 July 1998) is an Australian conservationist, zookeeper, actress, and television presenter. The daughter of conservationists Steve and Terri Irwin, she is regarded as an influential figure in Australian popular culture. Time magazine named her and her younger brother, Robert, one of the 100 most influential emerging leaders in the world on its inaugural list in 2019.

Born and raised on the Sunshine Coast, Irwin started working at her family's Australia Zoo when she was a child. She made regular appearances in her parents' wildlife documentary programs The Crocodile Hunter (1996–2004) and The Crocodile Hunter Diaries (2002–2006). Irwin had a brief career as a singer and released four studio albums; two of them appeared on the ARIA Charts. She made her hosting debut with the Discovery Kids series Bindi the Jungle Girl (2007–2008), for which she won the Logie Award for Most Popular New Female Talent and became the youngest performer to win a Daytime Emmy Award, winning for Outstanding Performer in Children's Programming.

As an actress, Irwin starred in the American family film Free Willy: Escape from Pirate's Cove (2010) and the Australian fantasy film Return to Nim's Island (2013). She won the twenty-first season of the ABC competition program Dancing with the Stars with professional dancer Derek Hough. She then starred in the Animal Planet series Crikey! It's the Irwins (2018–2022) alongside her family. Irwin currently serves as the chief executive officer of Australia Zoo and is on the board of directors of its non-profit organisation, Wildlife Warriors. She is married to retired wakeboarder Chandler Powell, with whom she has one daughter.

== Early life ==
Bindi Sue Irwin was born on 24 July 1998 in Buderim, a suburb on the Sunshine Coast of Queensland. She is the eldest child and only daughter of Australian conservationist Steve Irwin (1962–2006) and American naturalist Terri Irwin (née Raines; b. 1964). Her parents owned and operated Australia Zoo together and rose to international prominence with their wildlife documentary series The Crocodile Hunter (1996–2004). Irwin was named after two of her father's favourite animals: Bindi, a saltwater crocodile, and Sui, a Staffordshire Bull Terrier (1988–2004). Her given name means "young girl" in Nyungar, an Aboriginal Australian language. Her younger brother, Robert (b. 2003), is also a conservationist and television presenter. The siblings are dual citizens of Australia and the United States, and are of English, Irish, and Swedish descent.

Irwin was eight years old when her father was killed by a stingray barb while filming an underwater documentary. She was homeschooled at Australia Zoo for the majority of her education, allowing flexibility for her wildlife and media commitments. In 2014, she enrolled at TAFE Queensland East Coast and completed a Certificate III in business and tourism. In June 2021, Irwin claimed that her paternal grandfather, the naturalist Bob Irwin, was psychologically abusive and had shown no interest in spending time with her or her family. He denied her accusations through his biographer, Amanda French, not long after.

== Career ==
=== 1998–2006: Early appearances ===
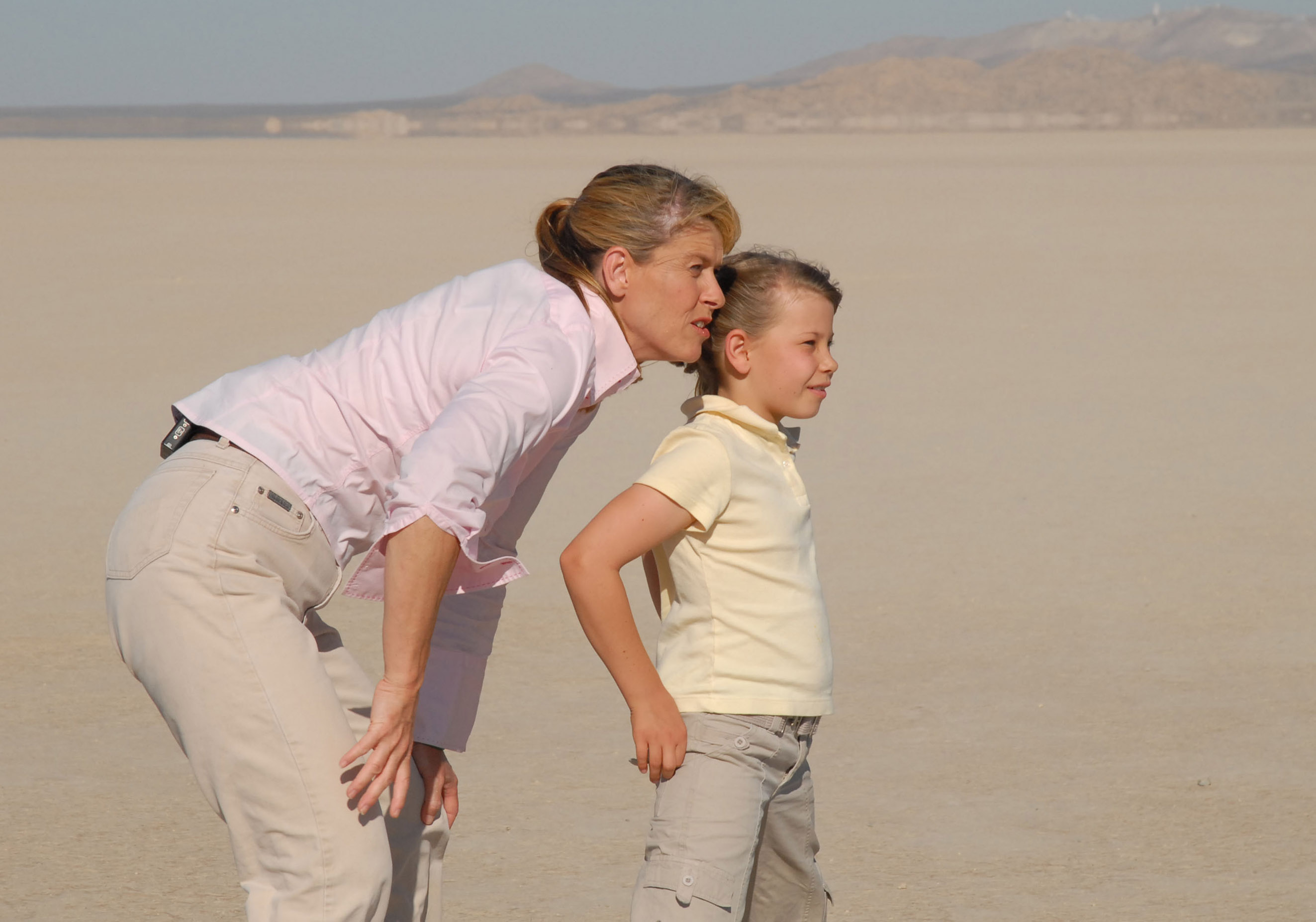
Irwin and her mother, Terri, at Edwards Air Force Base in 2007

Irwin made her television debut before she was six months old through an Animal Planet commercial with her father. She made regular appearances in her parents' television programs, including The Crocodile Hunter and The Crocodile Hunter Diaries (2002–2006). She had a credited role in the children's music film The Wiggles: Wiggly Safari (2002).

Following her father's death, Irwin vowed to continue his conservation and television work. She delivered a eulogy at her father's public memorial service at Australia Zoo's Crocoseum, in front of a crowd of over 5,000 people and a worldwide television audience of over 300 million viewers. Apart from some typing assistance, Irwin wrote the eulogy herself. She received a standing ovation from the in-person attendees and praise from the media, who commended her poise and strength. Irwin made her first public appearance since her father's memorial service at the 2006 Nickelodeon Australian Kids' Choice Awards in October. She released her first studio album and exercise video, Bindi Kid Fitness, on 27 November. The album featured appearances from her father and her accompanying band, The Crocmen.

=== 2007–2009: Bindi the Jungle Girl and music ventures ===
In January 2007, Irwin was appointed a tourism ambassador for Australia, attended a gala dinner with actors Russell Crowe and Naomi Watts, and appeared on several talk shows, including Larry King Live, The Ellen DeGeneres Show and the Late Show with David Letterman. She presented alongside comedian George Lopez and actor Tyler James Williams at the 2007 Kids' Choice Awards, and with actor Glenn Robbins at the Logie Awards of 2007.

Irwin made her television hosting debut with her wildlife program Bindi the Jungle Girl, which premiered on Discovery Kids on in June 2007. Her father played a central role in her series; he was filming for the series until his death, which prompted production to be temporarily put on hold. Irwin also presented an American television special about her father, My Daddy the Crocodile Hunter, for Animal Planet. She committed 10 percent of her wages from Bindi the Jungle Girl to her family's non-profit conservationist organisation, Wildlife Warriors.

In November 2007, Irwin released her debut single "Trouble in the Jungle" and appeared with her mother at the 81st annual Macy's Thanksgiving Day Parade. She won Most Popular New Female Talent at the Logie Awards of 2008. At the 35th Daytime Emmy Awards, Irwin won Outstanding Performer in a Children's Series for Bindi the Jungle Girl. She became the youngest performer to win a Daytime Emmy, breaking Camryn Grimes' eight-year record for the soap drama The Young and the Restless. Irwin released her second studio album and exercise video, Bindi Kid Fitness Vol 2: Jungle Dance Party, on 11 October 2008. She started performing with a new accompanying group, The Jungle Girls, by 2009.

=== 2010–2014: Expanded roles ===
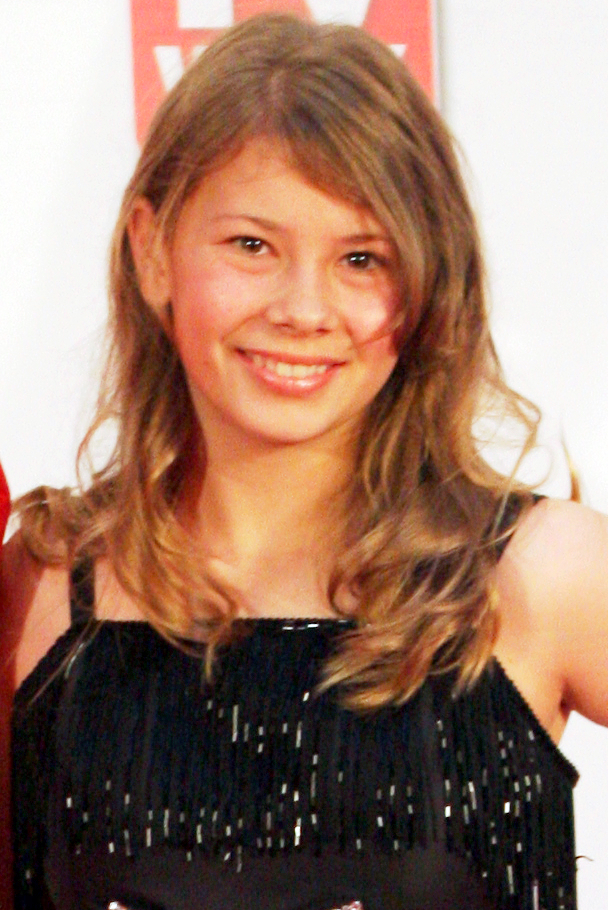
Irwin at the Logie Awards of 2011

Irwin earned a second nomination for Outstanding Performer in a Children's Series at the 36th Daytime Emmy Awards. She made her feature film debut as Kirra, an orphan living with her grandfather in South Africa, in the American family film Free Willy: Escape from Pirate's Cove (2010). One month later, Irwin launched a children's book series, titled Bindi Wildlife Adventures, through Penguin Books. She was named an ambassador for the World Wildlife Fund's Earth Hour initiative in March 2012. Her children's game show Bindi's Bootcamp, which put contestants through "adventure challenges" to educate and test their wildlife knowledge, premiered in July through ABC3.

Irwin starred alongside Matthew Lillard, Toby Wallace and John Waters in Brendan Maher's adventure fantasy film Return to Nim's Island (2013), the sequel to Nim's Island (2008). Irwin's performance received positive reviews from critics; Frank Hatherley of Screen International thought that she proved herself to be a "confident" and "appealing" actress. She additionally released her third studio album, Bindi and The Jungle Girls: African Dance Party, and had a minor role in the second season of the Canadian television series My Babysitter's a Vampire. Irwin was involved in a six-year campaign, led by her mother, to prevent bauxite strip mining at the Steve Irwin Wildlife Reserve on the Cape York Peninsula. The Queensland Government passed legislation to protect the reserve from mining in November 2013.

Irwin sparked controversy in March 2014 when she announced a partnership with the animal theme park company SeaWorld. The endorsement came in the aftermath of the release of Blackfish (2013), a documentary film concerning SeaWorld's treatment of orcas in captivity. In October, Irwin was named Young Conservationist of the Year by the Australian Geographic Society.

=== 2015–2019: Dancing with the Stars and Crikey! Its the Irwins ===
In August 2015, Irwin was announced as a contestant on twenty-first season of the American reality competition series Dancing with the Stars. She was partnered with professional dancer Derek Hough. Since Irwin was a minor during the competition, she required special permission from the Los Angeles County Superior Court to perform. She also won the inaugural Young Achiever Award at the Queensland Premier's Sustainability Awards while she was competing.

Irwin and Hough won the competition on 24 November 2015, making Irwin the first Australian contestant to win the series. The couple set the record for the most perfect scores earned in a single season, with eight; actor Jordan Fisher and professional dancer Lindsay Arnold broke their record during the twenty-fifth season. Ten years after her win, Irwin's brother won the thirty-fourth season with professional dancer Witney Carson. His win made them the first celebrity sibling duo to be crowned champions.

Week #	Dance / Song	Judges' scores				Result
Week #	Dance / Song	Inaba	Goodman	J. Hough	Tonioli	Result
1	Jive / "Crocodile Rock"	8	8	8	8	No elimination
2	Tango / "You Shook Me All Night Long"; Waltz / "Only a Man"	8; 8	8; 8	8; 8	8; 8	Safe
3	Quickstep / "Movin' on Up"	8	8^{1}	8	8	Safe
4	Contemporary / "Every Breath You Take"	9	9	9	10	Safe
5^{2}	Cha-cha-cha / "Hold My Hand"	9	10^{3}	9	9	No elimination
6	Rumba / "(I've Had) The Time of My Life"	10	10^{4}	10	10	Safe
7	Argentine tango / "Cry Little Sister"; Team Freestyle / "Ghostbusters"	10; 9	10; 9	10; 10	10; 9	Safe
8	Foxtrot / "Grace Kelly"	10	10	9	9	Safe
9	Viennese waltz / "Roses and Violets"; Team-up dance (Charleston) / "All That Jazz" & "Hot Honey Rag"	10; 10	10; 10	10; 10	10; 10	Safe
10; Semi-finals	Salsa / "You're Never Fully Dressed Without a Smile"; Trio Jazz / "Resolve"	9; 10	9; 10	9; 10	9; 10	No elimination
11; Finals	Quickstep / "Dr. Bones"; Freestyle / "Footprints in the Sand"; Argentine tango & Cha-cha-cha Fusion / "All the Way"	10; 10; 10	10; 10; 10	10; 10; 10	10; 10; 10	WINNER
^{1} Score given by guest judge Alfonso Ribeiro.^{2} This week only, for "Partner Switch-Up" week, Irwin performed with Valentin Chmerkovskiy instead of Hough. Hough performed with Alexa PenaVega.^{3} Score given by guest judge Maksim Chmerkovskiy.^{4} Score given by guest judge Olivia Newton-John.

Irwin released her fourth and final album, Bindi and The Jungle Girls: Bindi's Island Dance Party, in 2016. She co-hosted an episode of Entertainment Tonight with actor Cameron Mathison in May 2017. Irwin was appointed as a director of Australia Zoo and was named to the board of directors of Wildlife Warriors by November. In April 2018, Irwin and her family unveiled her father's star on the Hollywood Walk of Fame and met with Charles, Prince of Wales at Lady Elliot Island to discuss the future of the Great Barrier Reef.

Irwin returned to Animal Planet in October 2018 for the television program Crikey! It's the Irwins, which she starred in and co-produced alongside her mother and brother. The series, like The Crocodile Hunter franchise, followed the family and their work at Australia Zoo across four seasons. Irwin began campaigning to overturn controversial state legislation that allowed crocodile farmers to harvest wild eggs in February 2019. She appeared as a guest judge during the sixteenth season of the Australian iteration of Dancing with the Stars in April.

=== 2020–present: CEO of Australia Zoo ===
During the COVID-19 pandemic, Irwin was named the chief executive officer of Australia Zoo. She published Creating a Conservation Legacy, a book documenting her family's conservation history, on 15 November 2020 in celebration of Steve Irwin Day and the zoo's fiftieth birthday. The book leveraged Australia Zoo's online retail sales, which helped them manage through the pandemic.

Throughout 2021, Irwin participated in virtual events held by Peace One Day and The Perfect World Foundation. In 2022, she appeared on the second season of the World of Wonder competition program RuPaul's Drag Race Down Under and the second season of the Marvel Studios Animation series Spidey and His Amazing Friends. She also wrote the foreword for the children's book Good Night Stories for Rebel Girls: 100 Inspiring Young Changemakers.

Irwin received the President's Award for Conservation from The Explorers Club in April 2023. She was honoured with the Blossom Award from the Endometriosis Foundation of America in May 2024. Irwin worked with illustrator Ramona Kaulitzki on her first children's picture book, You Are a Wildlife Warrior!: Saving Animals and the Planet, which was published in February 2025 through Penguin Random House Australia.

== Public image ==
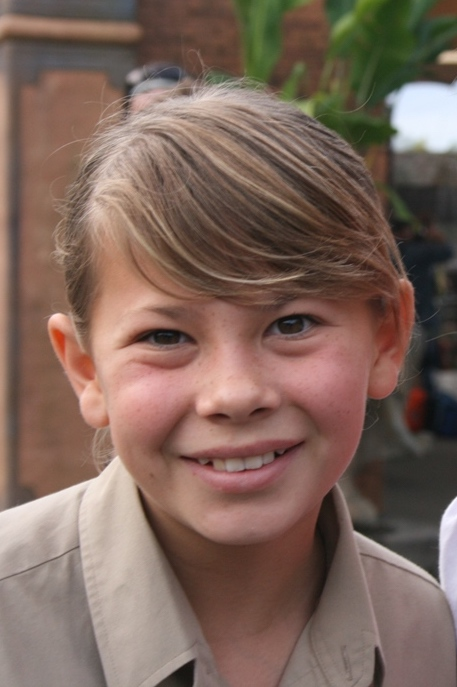
Irwin in 2009

Irwin spent her entire life in the public eye due to her parents' celebrity status. Her birth was televised on the first season of their wildlife documentary series The Crocodile Hunter Diaries. From a young age, media outlets noticed that Irwin possessed the "fearlessness and charisma" of her father and the "unaffected, down-to-earth charm" of her mother. Television producer John Stainton once told her father shortly before his death that she would "eclipse" him and become a "bigger star" than he had even been. In TV Week's annual readers' poll, her eulogy was named the television moment of 2006, receiving 43 percent of the total votes.

Journalists called Irwin a "publicist's dream" and complimented her polite personality. The Journal Gazette wrote that she had "smarts, comicality and confidence well beyond her years." As Irwin's "telegenic" public presence grew, critics were concerned that she was being exploited by Australia Zoo and producers for commercial benefits. Politicians such as senator Bill Heffernan believed there was a risk that Irwin would lose the opportunity to experience a normal childhood. Child psychologists and academics opined that she was not given the room to develop as she "leads a highly regulated life in which she doesn't seem to have much choice."

Irwin is regarded as an influential figure in Australian popular culture. At age eight, she became the youngest person to appear on the cover of New Idea. A species of charopid land snails discovered by scientists with the Queensland Museum was named after her. Shortly after turning 18, Irwin placed eighth on Maxim Australia's annual list of the country's most beautiful women; she used the recognition to promote self-empowerment and body positivity. She and her brother were named to the inaugural Time 100 Next list in 2019. Irwin holds a Guinness World Record for the most followers on Instagram for a television naturalist or conservationist. She was recognised by Hello! for her charity work and personal acts of kindness in 2022. The following year, she was declared the eighth-most influential Australian woman across social media platforms by Mediaweek.

== Personal life ==
Irwin met Chandler Powell, an American professional wakeboarder from Seffner, Florida, at Australia Zoo in November 2013, and they started a long distance relationship two years later. They got engaged on Irwin's twenty-first birthday, and were married on 25 March 2020 in a private ceremony at the zoo. Five months later, Irwin and Powell announced that they were expecting their first child. Their daughter, Grace Warrior Irwin Powell, was born on their first wedding anniversary. They live on the private grounds of Australia Zoo with Irwin's family.

In March 2023, Irwin revealed that she had been diagnosed with endometriosis after suffering from "insurmountable fatigue, pain and nausea" for over a decade. As her symptoms were often dismissed by doctors, longtime friend Leslie Mosier encouraged Irwin to undergo exploratory surgery. Gynecologist Tamer Seckin performed laparoscopy on Irwin at Lenox Hill Hospital. He found and removed 37 lesions and a cyst filled with menstrual blood. Irwin suffered a ruptured appendix in May 2025, which was removed by Seckin. She also had a hernia repaired and 14 endometriosis lesions removed during the operation.

== Discography ==
=== Albums ===
List of live albums, with selected chart positions and certifications
Title	Album details	Peak chart positions	Certifications
Title	Album details	AUS	Certifications
Bindi Kid Fitness (with Steve Irwin and The Crocmen)	Released: November 2006; Label: EMI; Formats: CD, digital download	15	ARIA: Platinum
Bindi Kid Fitness 2: Jungle Dance Party	Released: 2008; Label: The Best Picture Show Company; Formats: CD, digital download		
Bindi and The Jungle Girls: African Dance Party	Released: September 2012; Label: Self-released; Formats: CD, digital download		
Bindi and The Jungle Girls: Bindi's Island Dance Party	Released: 2016; Label: Self-released; Formats: CD, digital download		

=== Video albums ===
List of video albums, with selected chart positions and certifications
Title	Album details	Peak chart positions	Certifications
Title	Album details	AUS	Certifications
Bindi Kid Fitness (with Steve Irwin and The Crocmen)	Released: 2006		
Bindi Kid Fitness Vol. 2: Jungle Dance Party (with The Crocmen)	Released: September 2008	3	ARIA: Platinum

=== Singles ===
List of singles, with selected chart positions
Title	Year	Peak chart positions
Title	Year	AUS
"Trouble in the Jungle"	2007	85

== Filmography ==
=== Film ===
Year	Title	Role	Notes	Ref.
2002	The Wiggles: Wiggly Safari	Herself	Cameo appearance	
2002	The Crocodile Hunter: Collision Course	Herself	Cameo appearance	
2010	Free Willy: Escape from Pirate's Cove	Kirra Grisby	Direct-to-DVD	
2013	Return to Nim's Island	Nim Rusoe	Theatrical release (Australia); Direct-to-DVD (United States)	

=== Television ===
Year	Title	Role	Notes	Ref.
1999	The Crocodile Hunter	Herself	Episode: "Steve's Story" (S3E8)	
2007–2008	Bindi the Jungle Girl	Herself	Host	
2012–2015	Bindi's Bootcamp	Herself	Host	
2012	My Babysitter's a Vampire	Sunday Clovers	Episode: "Mirror, rorriM" (S2E5)	
2012	Steve Irwin's Wildlife Warriors	Herself	Host alongside Robert Irwin	
2012	Curious George	Bindi Bungee (voice)	Episode: "Monkey Down Under / Bright Lights, Little Monkey" (S7E1)	
2015, 2025	Dancing with the Stars	Herself	Season 21 champion; guest appearance (S34)	
2016	Have You Been Paying Attention?	Herself	Guest quizmaster (Special)	
2018–2022	Crikey! It's the Irwins	Herself	Main cast; also co-producer	
2022–present	Spidey and His Amazing Friends	Isla Coralton (voice)	Recurring role (7 episodes)	
2022	RuPaul's Drag Race Down Under	Herself	Guest appearance (S2E1)	

== Accolades ==
Award	Year (Note: Indicates the year of ceremony. Each year is linked to the article about the awards held that year, wherever possible.)	Recipient(s)	Category	Result	Ref.
ARIA Music Awards	2007	Bindi Kid Fitness with Steve Irwin and The Crocmen	Best Children's Album	Nominated	
ARIA Music Awards	2009	Bindi Kid Fitness 2 Jungle Dance Party	Best Children's Album	Nominated	
Daytime Emmy Awards	2008	Bindi the Jungle Girl	Outstanding Performer in Children's Programming	Won	
Daytime Emmy Awards	2009	Bindi the Jungle Girl	Outstanding Performer in Children's Programming	Nominated	
Logie Awards	2008	Bindi the Jungle Girl	Most Popular New Female Talent	Won	
Shorty Awards	2020	Irwin	Best in Activism (shared with Robert Irwin)	Nominated	

== Notes ==
Awards and achievements
Preceded by Rumer Willis & Valentin Chmerkovskiy	Dancing with the Stars (U.S.) winners Season 21 (Fall 2015 with Derek Hough)	Succeeded by Nyle DiMarco & Peta Murgatroyd
