= My Steve =

2007 memoir by Terri Irwin

- My Steve
- Author: Terri Irwin
- Language: English
- Subject: Steve Irwin
- Genre: Memoir
- Publisher: Simon & Schuster Australia
- Publication date: November 2007
- Publication place: Australia
- Media type: Print (Hardcover)
- Pages: 271
- ISBN: 978-0-7318-1333-9
- OCLC: 180963623
- Dewey Decimal: 597.9092 22
- LC Class: QL31.I78 I78 2007

My Steve is a biographical account of Terri Irwin's life with her late husband, the zoo owner and television personality Steve Irwin. It was published by Simon & Schuster Australia.

Reviewer Bruce Elder wrote: "Terri Irwin tells a simple story with considerable passion and straightforward honesty".
