= Australia Zoo =

Zoo located on the Sunshine Coast, Queensland, Australia

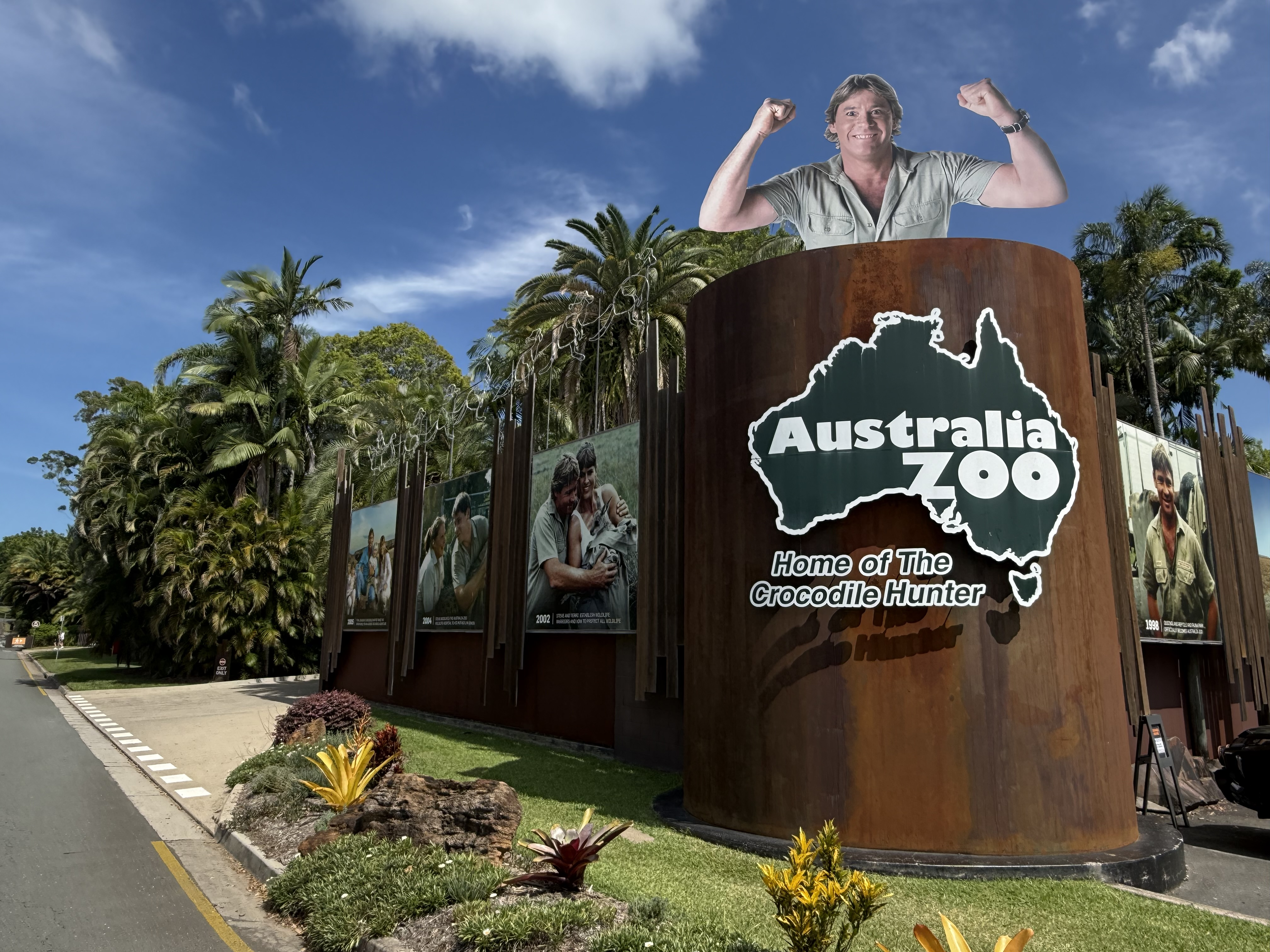
- Australia Zoo entrance, 2026
- Interactive map of Australia Zoo
- 26.8366°S 152.9595°E
- Date opened: 3 June 1970; 56 years ago
- Location: 1638 Steve Irwin Way, Beerwah, Queensland, Australia
- Land area: 110 acres (45 ha)
- No. of animals: 1,200+
- Annual visitors: 700,000
- Memberships: ZAA
- Owner: Terri Irwin
- Website: www.australiazoo.com.au

The Australia Zoo, previously known as the Beerwah Reptile and Fauna Park and the Queensland Reptile and Fauna Park, is a zoological and botanical garden located in Beerwah, a suburb of the Sunshine Coast region in Queensland, Australia. Encompassing more than 750 acres of bushland, 110 (45 ha) of which are open to the public, the zoo hosts over 1,200 animals. It was opened on 3 June 1970 by Bob and Lyn Irwin, and is a regional member of the Zoo and Aquarium Association (ZAA).

Australia Zoo began as a two-acre wildlife park with native animals such as lace monitors, tiger snakes, freshwater crocodiles, magpie geese and kangaroos. Steve Irwin, the founders' son, took over the park management in 1991 and handled operations with his wife, Terri Irwin. Their wildlife documentary television program The Crocodile Hunter (1996–2004) established Australia Zoo as a popular tourist attraction, welcoming approximately 700,000 annual visitors. The Irwins used the money raised from filming the series and its additional merchandise to fund international conservation efforts through their non-profit organization Wildlife Warriors, as well as expand the zoo and build new exhibits.

After Steve was killed by a stingray injury on 4 September 2006, Terri was named the sole owner and chairwoman of Australia Zoo. The Irwin family continues to operate the zoo; their daughter Bindi serves as its chief executive officer, while their son Robert and son-in-law Chandler Powell are a part of the management team.

== History ==
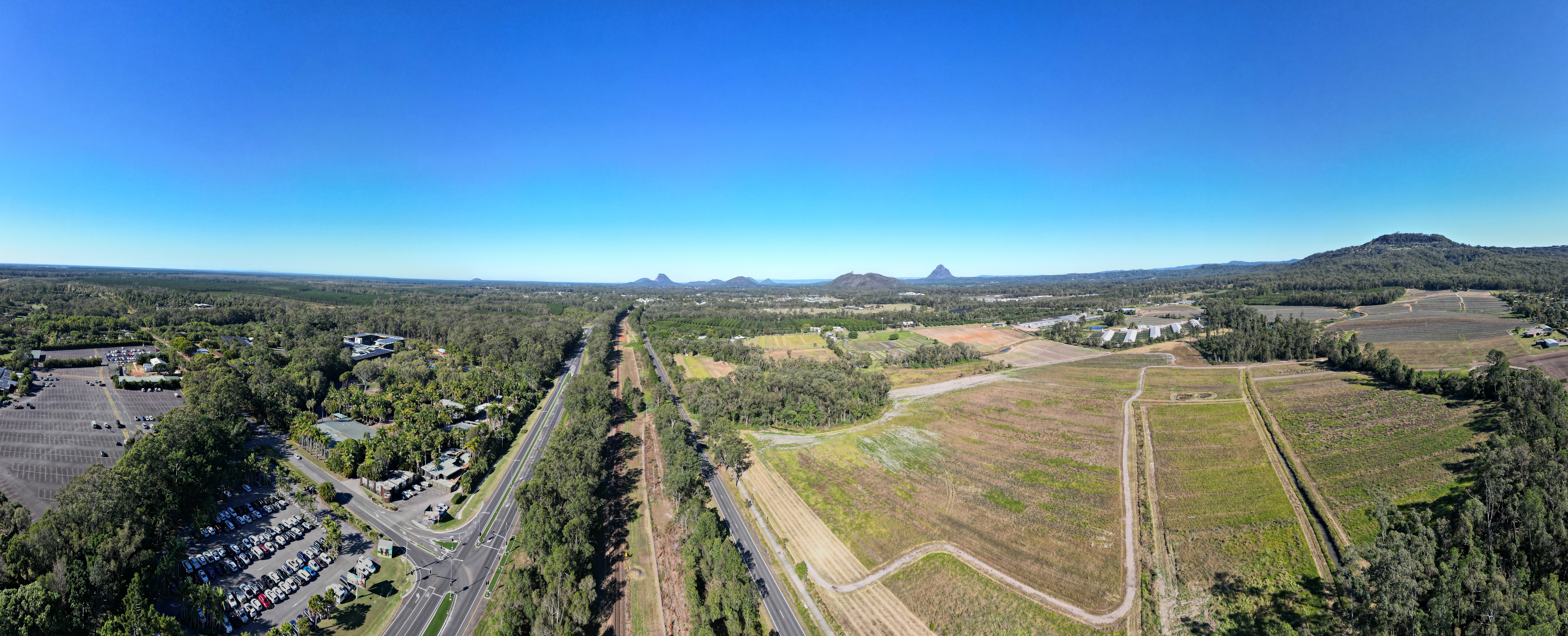
Aerial panorama of the Australia Zoo. 2023.

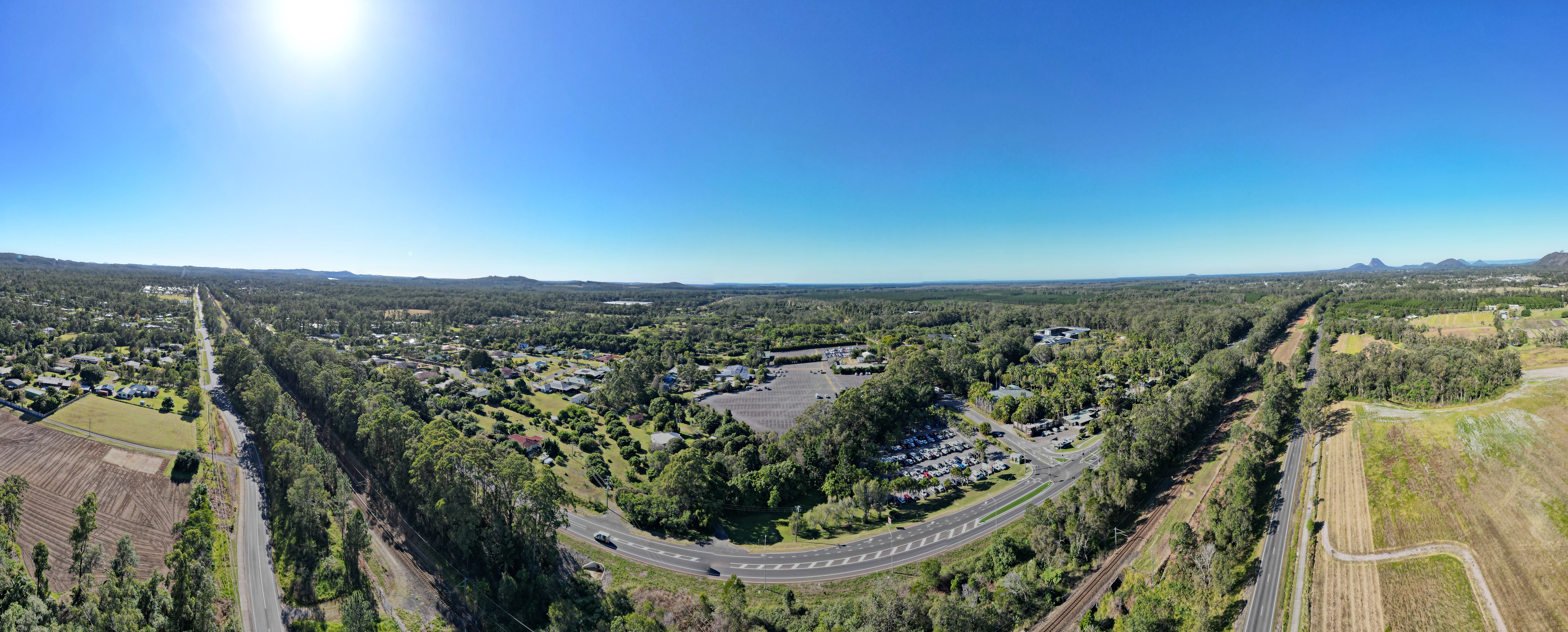
Aerial panorama of the Australia Zoo along Steve Irwin Way. 2023.

=== 1970–1992 ===
Australia Zoo was opened by Bob and Lyn Irwin on 3 June 1970 under the name Beerwah Reptile and Fauna Park. Bob is a world-renowned herpetologist, who is regarded as a pioneer in the keeping and breeding of reptiles, while Lyn was one of the first to care for and rehabilitate sick and injured wildlife in South East Queensland. Bob and Lyn passed on their love and respect for wildlife to their three children: Joy, Steve, and Mandy. Steve had helped Bob and Lyn since childhood to care for crocodiles and reptiles and to maintain the growing number of animals in the zoo. In 1982, the park was renamed the Queensland Reptile and Fauna Park and the area was doubled with the purchase of another 4 acres (1.6 ha). In 1987, the Crocodile Environmental Park was opened in an effort to aid saltwater crocodile protection. By the 1990s, the Crocodile Environmental Park had become very popular and was seen as unique for its display of crocodile feeding within the park. The area was mainly used to house adult saltwater crocodiles that had been captured and relocated from the wild.

=== 1992–2006 ===
The 1990s brought many changes: Bob and Lyn retired and moved to Rosedale, Queensland, while Steve and his wife Terri changed the name of their now growing wildlife park to Australia Zoo in 1998. As filming generated extra funds, Steve and Terri put all money raised from filming and merchandise into conservation and building new exhibits. Their philosophy was that the zoo animals came first, the zoo team came second, and the zoo visitors came third. The zoo also expanded with the creation of a management team and hiring around 50 staff. Australia Zoo won the Australian Tourism Awards for 2003–2004 in the category Major Tourist Attraction. In 2004, the Australian Animal Hospital was opened next to the zoo to help with animal care and rehabilitation. The facility was built in an old avocado packing shed, and was dedicated to Lyn. The facility had a single operating room, and with a staff of 20 full-time workers and 80 volunteers, it cared for up to 6,000 animals per year. Steve Irwin died in 2006, the same year Australia Zoo Retail won the Tourism Retailing Award from Qantas Australian Tourism Awards.

=== 2007–present ===
In 2007, the zoo and the Government of Queensland made a land deal involving giving a parcel of land from the Beerwah State Forest to Australia Zoo in return for land near Peachester State Forest which was transferred to the government for forestry. The swap permitted the development of an open-range safari attraction, allowing the zoo to expand to a world-class standard. In 2008, a new $5 million animal hospital, claimed to be the largest wildlife hospital in the world, opened next to the packing shed. The new 1,300-square-metre (14,000 sq ft) facility is built of mud brick and hay. It contains two operating theatres with viewing areas for student veterinarians, two treatment rooms, intensive care units for mammals, birds, and reptiles, an X-ray room, and public areas including a drop-off area, pharmacy, nursery, and waiting room. A conference room in the building will be rented out to help generate operating funds.

On 15 March 2008 the Brisbane-based newspaper, The Sunday Mail, claimed there are plans to sell Australia Zoo to Animal Planet and create a $100-million Disney-style wildlife theme park. Terri has publicly announced that she has no plans to sell the zoo, but is looking to expand the park. Despite rumours that she intended to return to the United States, Terri denied the claims and became an Australian citizen on 20 November 2009.

In 2010, Australia Zoo won Gold in the Queensland Tourism Awards for Major Tourist Attraction and in 2019, they won the RACQ People's Choice Award – Experience & Services. During the 2019–20 Australian bushfire season, the Wildlife Hospital associated with the zoo treated its 90,000th injured animal.

== Management ==
The Australia Zoo business is owned by Australia Zoo Pty Ltd, but the land on which the zoo is located, and most of the surrounding area, is owned by Silverback Properties Pty Ltd.

== Animals ==
Australia Zoo contains a wide range of birds, mammals and reptiles.

Birds

- Australian king parrot
- Bar-shouldered dove
- Black-necked stork
- Blue-and-yellow macaw
- Brahminy kite
- Brolga
- Bush budgerigar
- Bush stone-curlew
- Chestnut-breasted mannikin
- Eastern whipbird
- Emu
- Galah
- Glossy ibis
- Gouldian finch
- Great cormorant
- Green-winged macaw
- Helmeted guineafowl
- Little pied cormorant
- Magpie goose
- Noisy pitta
- Pacific emerald dove
- Pied imperial pigeon
- Radjah shelduck
- Rainbow lorikeet
- Red-browed finch
- Red-collared lorikeet
- Red-rumped parrot
- Red-tailed black cockatoo
- Rose-crowned fruit dove
- Sacred kingfisher
- Satin bowerbird
- Scarlet macaw
- Southern cassowary
- Sulphur-crested cockatoo
- Superb parrot
- Torresian imperial pigeon
- Wedge-tailed eagle
- Whistling kite
- White-headed pigeon
- Wonga pigeon
- Yellow-tailed black cockatoo
- Zebra finch

Mammals

- Asian small-clawed otter
- Black-flanked rock wallaby
- Brush-tailed rock wallaby
- Cheetah
- Common plains zebra
- Common wombat
- Dingo
- Eastern grey kangaroo
- Giraffe
- Grant's zebra
- Koala
- Meerkat
- Quokka
- Red kangaroo
- Red panda
- Red-necked wallaby
- Ring-tailed lemur
- Short-beaked echidna
- Southern hairy-nosed wombat
- Southern white rhinoceros
- Sumatran elephant
- Sumatran tiger
- Swamp wallaby
- Tasmanian devil
- Yellow-footed rock wallaby

Reptiles

- Aldabra giant tortoise
- American alligator
- Black-headed python
- Boyd's forest dragon
- Broad-shelled turtle
- Burmese python
- Common blue-tongued skink
- Common death adder
- Corn snake
- Cunningham's skink
- Eastern brown snake
- Eastern diamondback rattlesnake
- Eastern shingleback
- Eastern water dragon
- Elongated tortoise
- Fijian crested iguana
- Freshwater crocodile
- Frilled lizard
- Gila monster
- Green anaconda
- Indian star tortoise
- Inland bearded dragon
- Inland taipan
- Irwin's turtle
- King brown snake
- King cobra
- Komodo dragon
- Krefft's turtle
- Land mullet
- Mertens' water monitor
- Murray River turtle
- Radiated tortoise
- Red-bellied black snake
- Rhinoceros iguana
- Saltwater crocodile
- Saw-shelled turtle
- Scrub python
- Tiger snake
- Woma python
- Yakka skink

== Exhibits ==
=== The Crocoseum ===
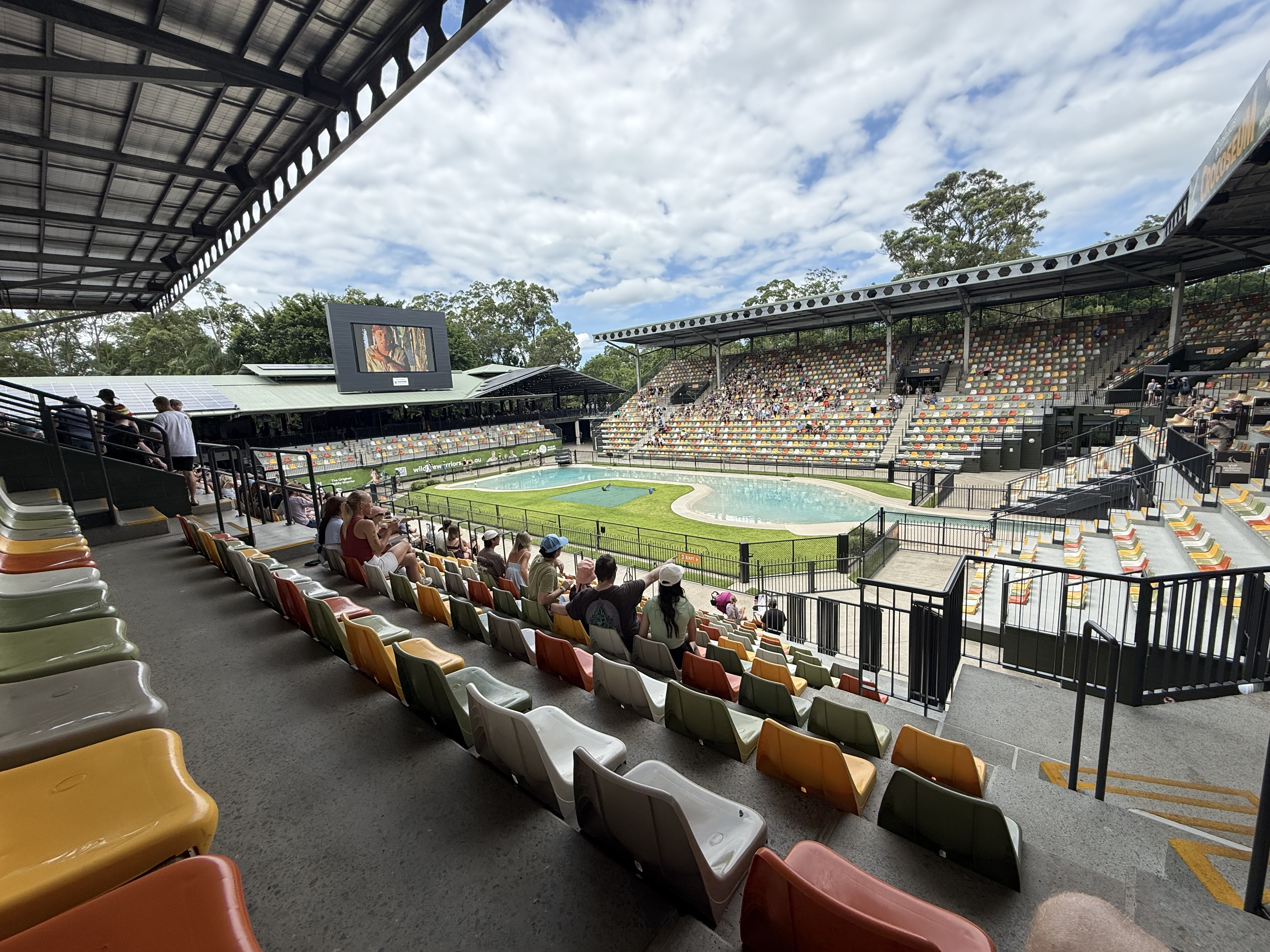
Crocoseum at Australia Zoo (2026)

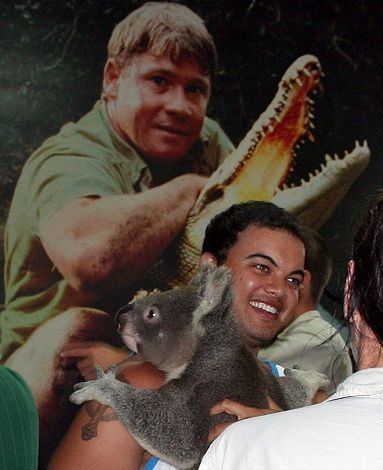
Guy Sebastian before a concert in 2009

The 'Containers For Change Crocoseum' stadium at the zoo has a seating capacity of 5,000. It is used mostly for animal shows. At the time of its construction, it was the first in the world where snake, bird and crocodile shows were conducted. Australia Zoo calls this the 'Australia Zoo Wildlife Warriors Show'. This is also where the zoo presents concerts, such as the Summer Down Under series.

=== Africa ===
On 17 September 2011, the zoo opened its African Safari exhibit, a multi-species replica of the Serengeti ecosystem, showcasing giraffes, plains zebra and southern white rhinos' interacting as they would in the wild. Also on display are cheetahs, but not in the area where the other animals are. There is also an exhibit for meerkats next to the big savanna who share their exhibit with wandering helmeted guineafowls. This area of the zoo includes Queensland bottle trees reflecting the native African baobab tree and mock kopjes as seen in southern Africa.

=== Tiger Temple ===
Opened in April 2005, this exhibit houses Sumatran tigers (and previously also Bengal tigers). The exhibit was built to resemble the Angkor Wat temple in Cambodia. It is enclosed on two sides by glass, and includes an underwater viewing area.

=== Elephantasia ===
Elephantasia is a 12-acre (4.9 ha) Asian themed exhibit that opened in 2006 and is the largest elephant enclosure in Australia. It includes a wading pool with a fountain, and tropical gardens with shaded areas for the zoo's elephants. In October 2019 Australia Zoo imported four female Sumatran elephants. The elephants are on display in Elephantasia as of December 2021.

=== Rainforest Aviary ===
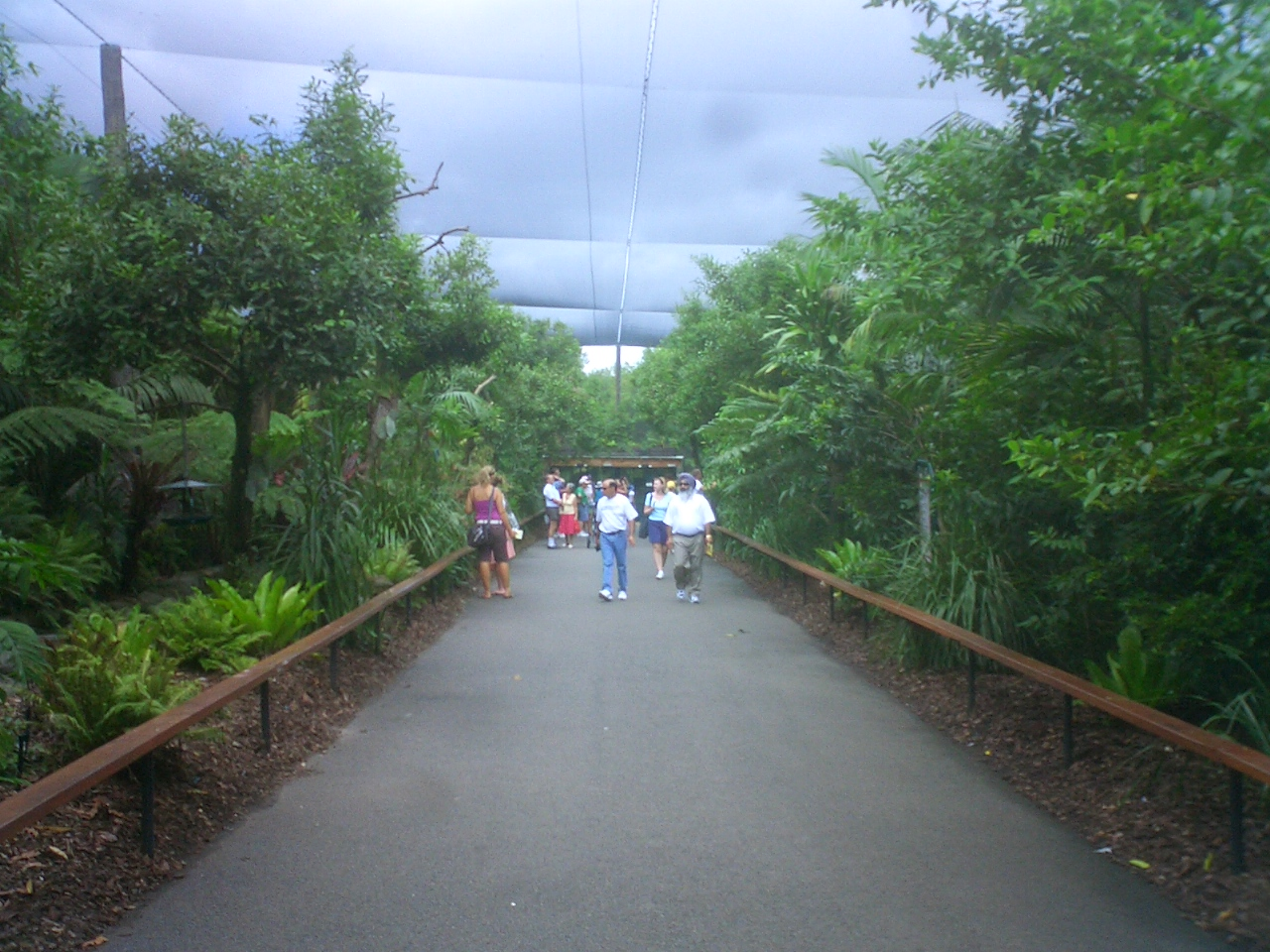
Aviary at the Australia Zoo

The Rainforest Aviary is an outdoor walk-through aviary housing about 150 birds, most of which are native to Australia. Adjacent to the Rainforest Aviary is the Birds of Prey aviary, which holds various species of raptors and other predatory birds. Following the birth of Bindi Irwin's daughter the Rainforest Aviary was renamed Grace's Bird Garden.

=== Bindi's Island ===
Opened beside the Africa exhibit in December 2014 and named after Steve's daughter, Bindi's Island is a three-story "treehouse" built around a replica fig tree. It offers panoramic views of Australia Zoo, including the adjacent lemur island.

=== Robert's Reptile House ===
The zoo's indoor reptile exhibits which showcase twenty different species of reptiles (and three species of frogs) in sixteen different terrariums.

=== Other Exhibits ===
Further exhibit zones include Crocodile Environmental Park, Roo Heaven, Wetlands and others.

== Other facilities ==
=== Dining ===
Visitors can eat at the open air upper story "Crikey! Cafe" (which seats up to 1,500), at the Grasslands Cafe, or at several food vending stands around the zoo.

=== Transport ===
To get around the zoo, visitors can take Steve's Safari Shuttle, a 'modified trailered bus' that operates on a bitumen (asphalt) roadway circuit. Visitors can also hire a caddie with guide to drive around the zoo for the day.

=== Playgrounds ===
The zoo includes multiple shaded playgrounds as well as a jumping pillow and water splash park.

== Activities ==
There are 4 walk-through enclosures that visitors can enter and feed kangaroos, wallabies, and koalas, and there is often an opportunity to pet a koala when staff are in the exhibit.

The zoo offers a roving animal team that walks around the grounds throughout the day with various animals such as alligators, birds, snakes, and lizards. Visitors may have their photo taken with the animals and can purchase professional copies from the zoo's photo lab.

In April 2019 Australia Zoo announced $8 million project 'Camp Crocodile'. The wildlife camping experience is expected to lure over 39,000 visitors to the Sunshine Coast each year.

== Animal rescue and rehabilitation ==
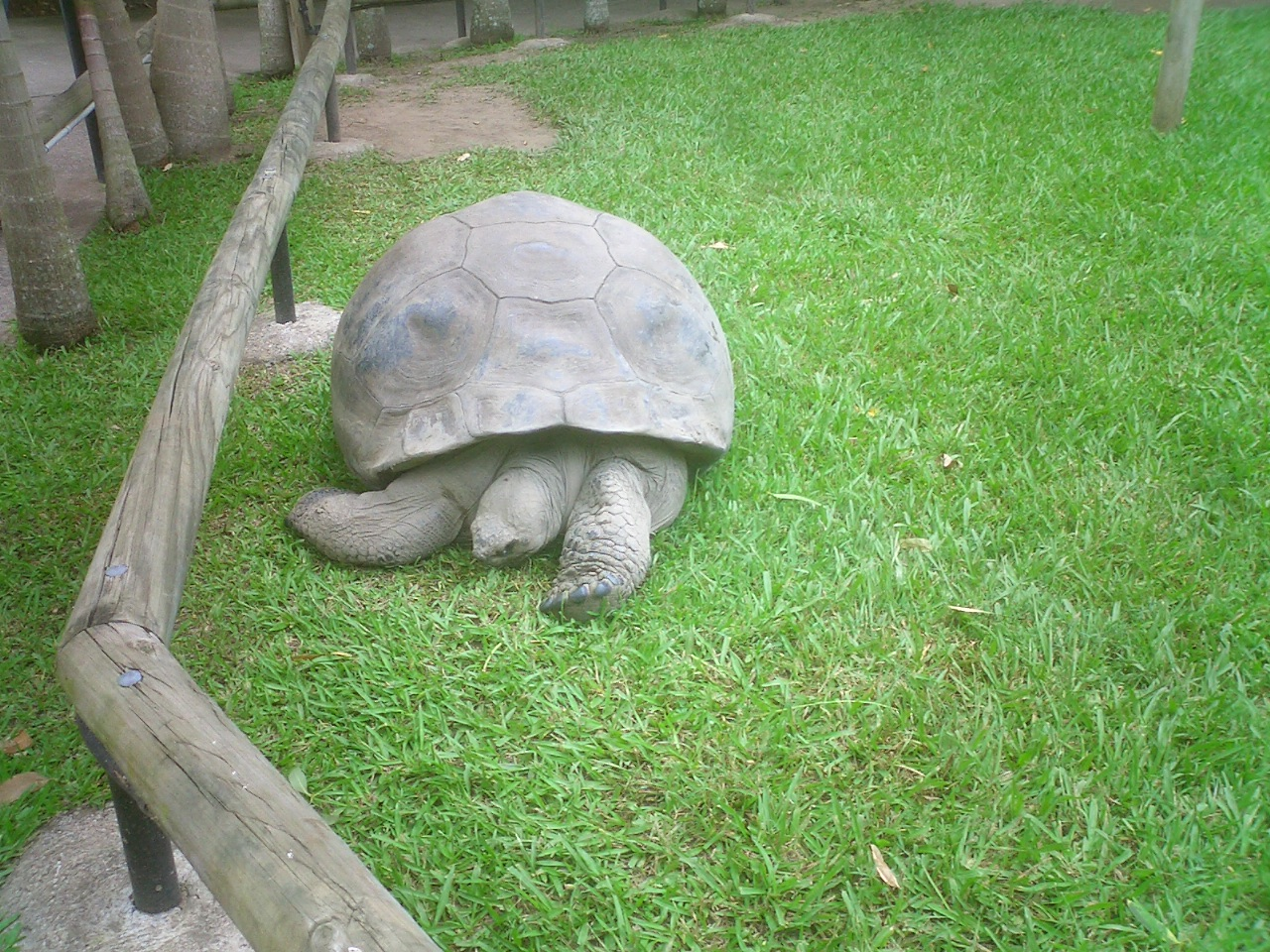
Harriet, the third oldest tortoise ever authenticated, lived at Australia Zoo

=== Wildlife Warriors ===
Wildlife Warriors runs a rescue operation and care station for any native wildlife which may be injured in accidents outside the zoo.

This effort is now supported by the 1,300-square-metre (14,000 sq ft) Australia Zoo Wildlife Hospital next to the zoo, which can care for up to 10,000 animals per year, with two operating theatres, two treatment rooms, intensive care units for mammals, birds, and reptiles, and an X-ray room, and was designed by WD Architects. The hospital is named in honour of Steve Irwin's mother Lynn Irwin, who died in a car accident in 2000.

== Other zoo properties ==
=== Steve Irwin Wildlife Reserve ===
This 135,000-hectare (330,000-acre) property was acquired with the assistance of the Australian government as part of the National Reserve System Programme. It is located on the Cape York Peninsula in Queensland, and contains spring fed wetlands that provide a water source to threatened habitat and the Wenlock River.

=== Iron Bark Station (Blackbutt) ===
Australia Zoo purchased the 3,500 acres (1,400 ha) Iron Bark Station located at Blackbutt, Queensland in 1994. It is part of the great dividing Range, where the East coast meets the dry West. An additional 325 acres (132 ha) was purchased in 1994 to save a dwindling koala population, with fewer than 12 koalas left in the area. Management immediately commenced reforestation, including 44,000 eucalypt trees for koalas. In 1998, another 325 acres (132 ha) was purchased. In 1999, a 5 acres (2.0 ha) release facility was established to rehabilitate native marsupials in the area. Another 1,000 acres (400 ha) was purchased in 1999 with funds from the Lynn Irwin Memorial fund (now Wildlife Warriors Worldwide), and another 1,800 acres (730 ha) was added in 2002. In 2007, Bob Irwin became full-time manager of the station.

=== Mourachan (St. George) ===
This conservation area was developed to protect endangered species, such as the woma python and yakka skink. It consists of 117,174 acres, in which various habitat types have been created, by Australia Zoo and the Australia Zoo Wildlife Warriors.

It is a place where endangered species can reestablish populations, and as of 2015, Terri purchased an additional 33,000 acres of land to expand this conservation habitat.
