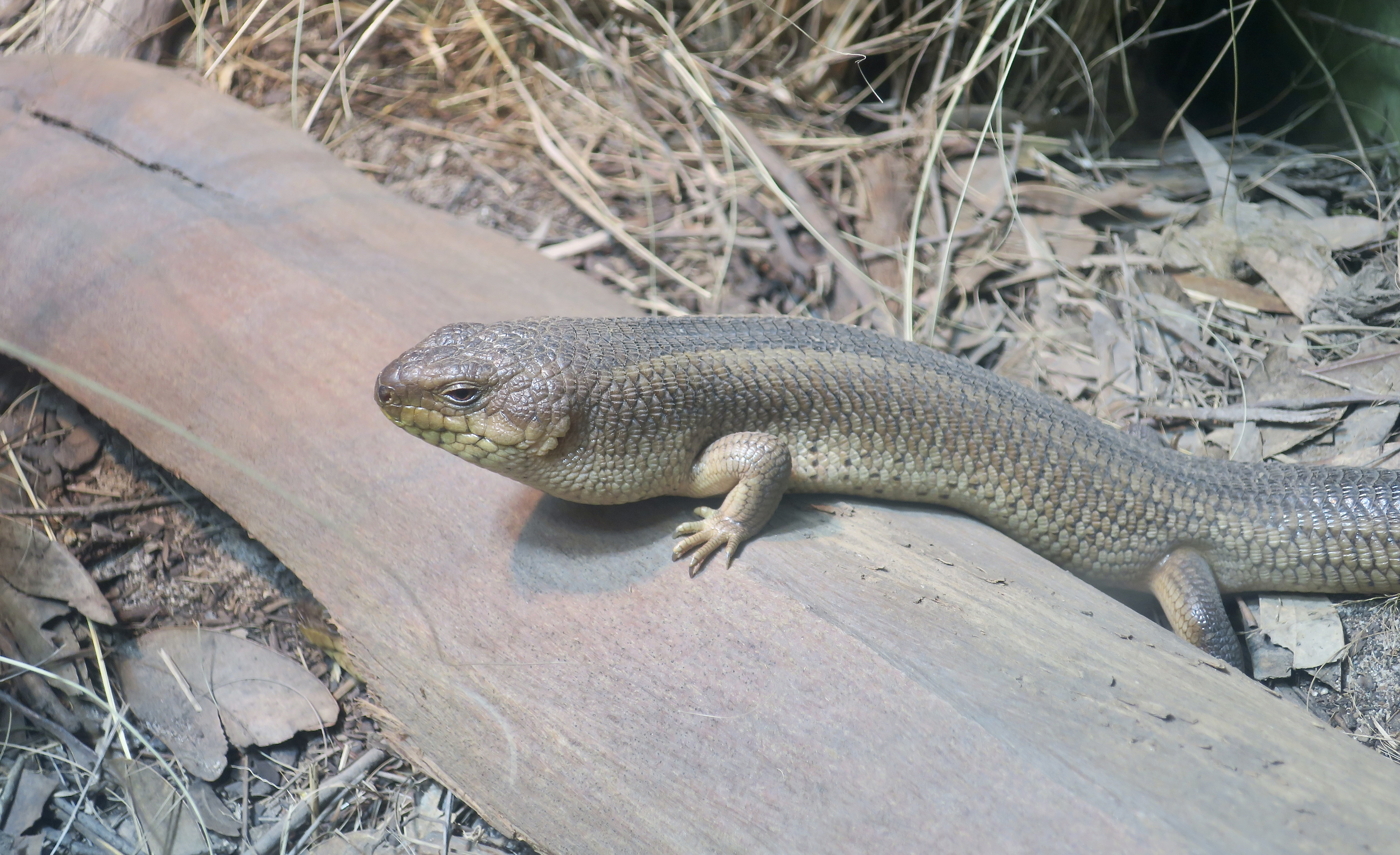

Conservation status
- Least Concern (IUCN 3.1)

Scientific classification
- Kingdom: Animalia
- Phylum: Chordata
- Class: Reptilia
- Order: Squamata
- Family: Scincidae
- Genus: Egernia
- Species: E. rugosa

Binomial name
- Egernia rugosa De Vis, 1888
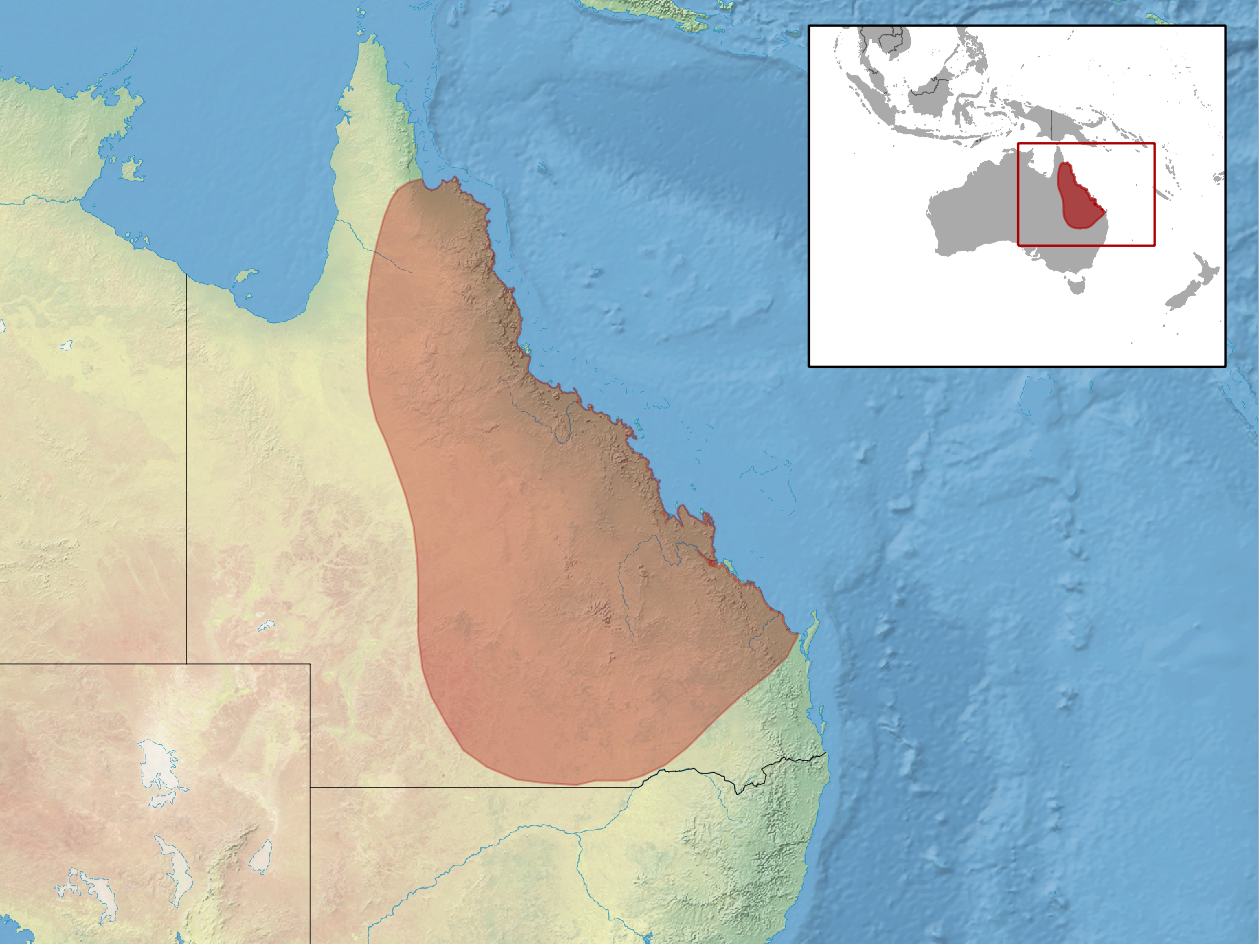

= Yakka skink =

Species of lizard

The yakka skink (Egernia rugosa) is a species of large skink, a lizard in the family Scincidae. The species is native to the Brigalow Belt in Queensland in eastern Australia.

It is listed as a vulnerable species under the Environment Protection and Biodiversity Conservation Act 1999.

The yakka skink is brown with a dark stripe on its back and a paler, yellowy-orange underbelly. They live communally in burrows made of soil or wood mounds. Sometimes they take over abandoned rabbit holes. Each yakka skink's litter usually has two or three live babies. They are most active during the day, but are fairly retiring and return to their burrows if disturbed. Omnivores, they forage for insects but also eat fruits and soft leaves.

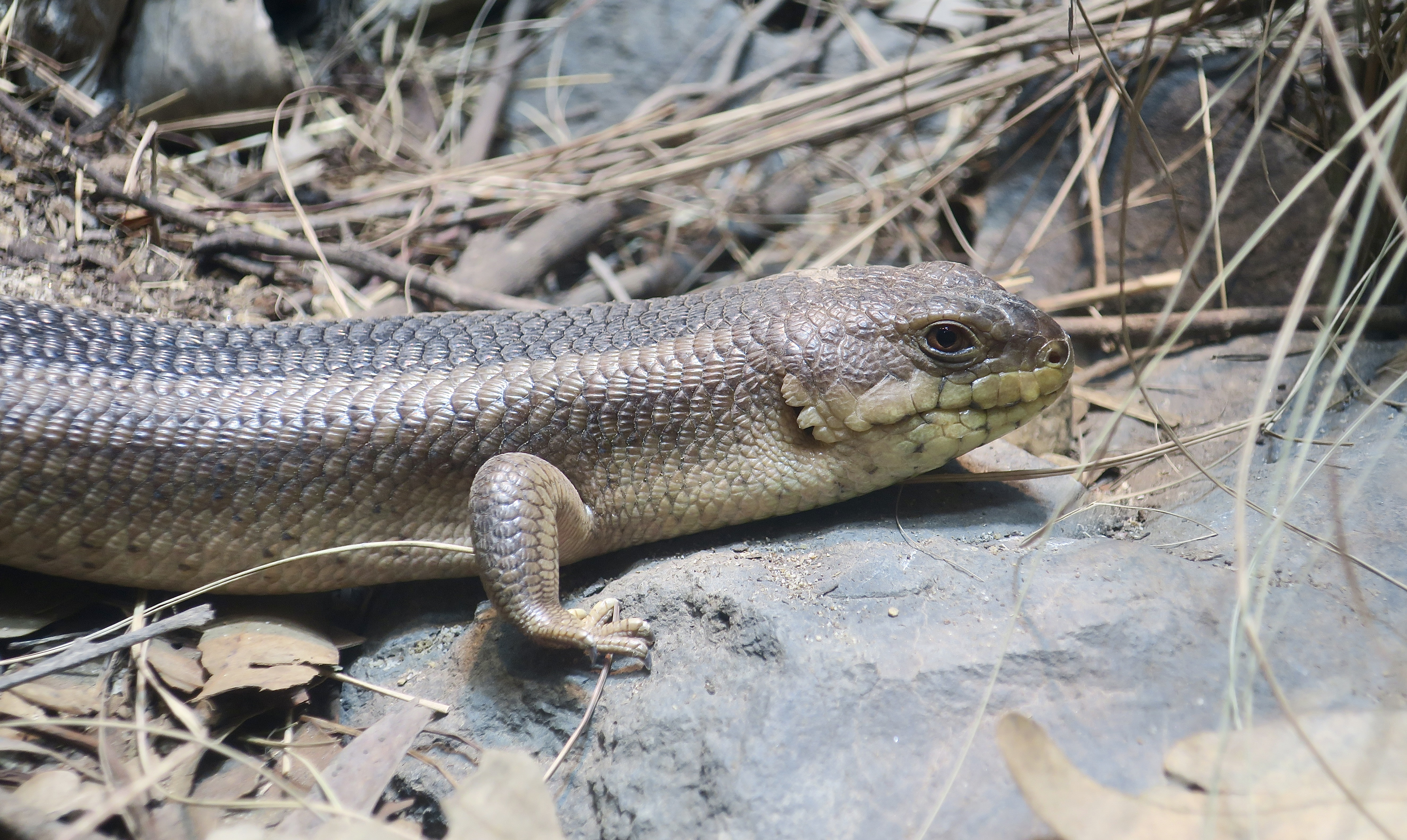
A Yakka skink (Egernia rugosa) at Featherdale Wildlife Park.
