= Terri Irwin =

American and Australian conservationist (born 1964)

Terri Irwin AM
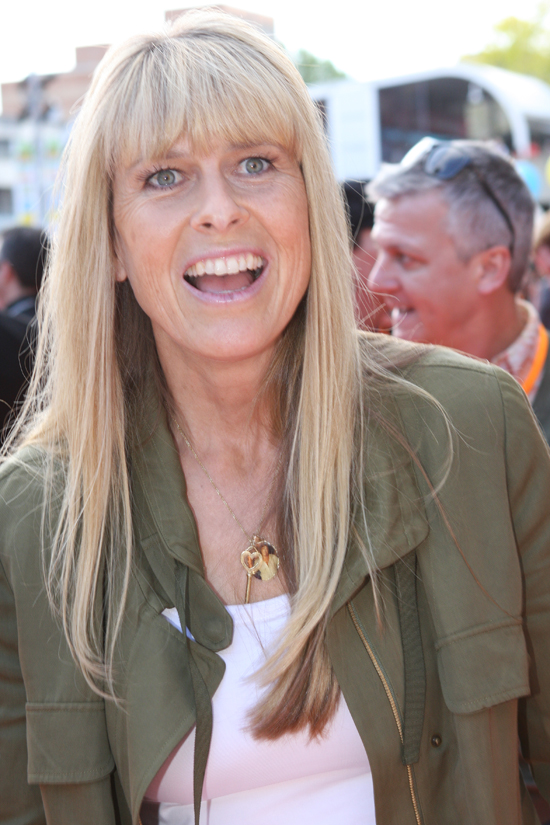
- Irwin in October 2011
- Born: Terri Elizabeth Raines; July 20, 1964 (age 62); Eugene, Oregon, U.S.
- Other name: Terri Raines Irwin
- Citizenship: United States; Australia
- Occupations: Conservationist; naturalist; zookeeper; television personality; businesswoman; author
- Years active: 1986–present
- Notable work: The Crocodile Hunter
- Spouse: Steve Irwin (m. 1992; died 2006)
- Children: Bindi; Robert
- Website: australiazoo.com.au

Terri Raines Irwin (born Terri Elizabeth Raines; July 20, 1964) is an American-Australian conservationist, naturalist, zookeeper, and television personality. The widow of conservationist Steve Irwin, she is the sole owner and chairwoman of Australia Zoo in Beerwah, Queensland.

Born and raised in Oregon, Irwin founded a wildlife rehabilitation center for injured predator mammals, such as cougars, bears, and bobcats. She met her husband in 1991 while visiting rehabilitation facilities in Australia. The two married the following year and achieved international recognition through their nature television series The Crocodile Hunter (1996–2004) and its spin-offs: Croc Files (1999–2001) and The Crocodile Hunter Diaries (2002–2006). They had two children, Bindi and Robert, before Steve was killed by a stingray injury while filming an underwater documentary.

== Early life ==
Terri Elizabeth Raines was born on July 20, 1964, at Sacred Heart Medical Center in Eugene, Oregon. She has two older sisters, Bonnie and Patricia, and a half-brother, Rolfe. Her father, Clarence Alonzo Raines (1921–2008), served in World War II as a U.S. Navy radioman on the USS Boise (CL-47) and was a lieutenant for the Eugene Police Department. Her mother, Julia May "Judy" Raines (née Cline; 1926–2014), was a schoolteacher from Youngstown, Ohio.

Raines was raised Christian. She and her friends enjoyed a free-range childhood exploring parks and landforms such as Alton Baker Park, Spencer Butte, and the Willamette Valley. As she grew older, Raines started working at Westates Flagman Inc., a long-haul trucking business owned by her parents. Her father constantly brought home injured animals from the highways, which sparked her interest in wildlife conservation.

== Career ==
Raines started her own wildlife rehabilitation facility called Cougar Country in 1986, where she educated the public and released predator mammals such as foxes, raccoons, bears, bobcats, and cougars back into the wild. The facility handled up to 300 animals each year. In 1989, Raines worked as a veterinary technician at an emergency veterinary hospital to further her knowledge on animal welfare.

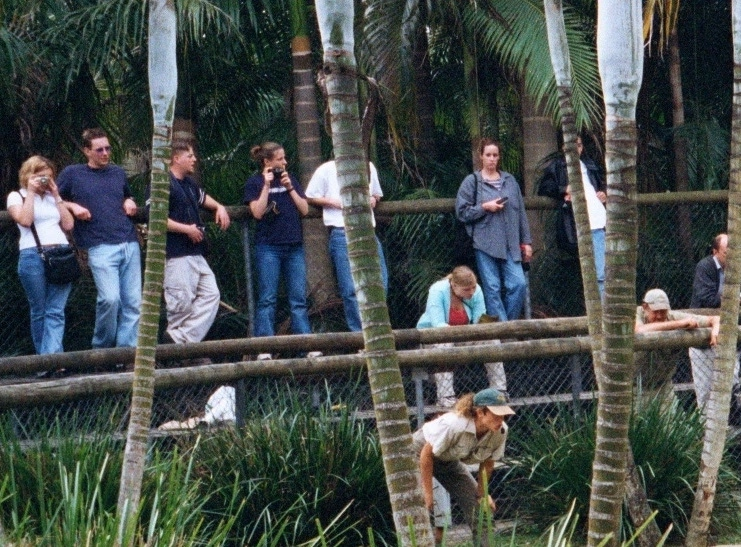
Irwin in front of spectators at Australia Zoo in 1997

Raines relocated to Queensland, Australia, and closed Cougar Country upon her marriage to conservationist Steve Irwin. Footage of their honeymoon, which was spent trapping crocodiles together, was shot by John Stainton and later became the first episode of their wildlife documentary television series The Crocodile Hunter. Debuting in Australia in 1992, the program became successful in over 130 countries through its broadcast on Animal Planet and reached an estimated 500 million people. The Irwins owned and operated Australia Zoo while filming The Crocodile Hunter. They also worked on the spinoff programs Croc Files (1999–2001) and The Crocodile Hunter Diaries (2002–2006), as well as the adventure comedy feature film The Crocodile Hunter: Collision Course (2002).

Irwin and her husband founded Wildlife Warriors, a non-profit organization, in 2002 to fund international conservation efforts. Following Steve's death, she was named the sole owner and chairwoman of Australia Zoo. She and the zoo were sued for $2.5 million by a debt collection agency at the time, but the lawsuit was later dismissed in court. Irwin signed on to a three-year research program in correspondence with Australia Zoo supporting the Marine Mammal Institute at Oregon State University, funding two $250,000 research projects on humpback whales. "Learning about whales is part of a bigger picture," she said of the project. "Our oceans are in jeopardy and the more research we gather about whales, the more knowledge we have to help us save, protect and preserve our delicate oceans."

Irwin expressed support for the Sea Shepherd Conservation Society and was present at the launching of one of the organization's vessels, which was renamed after her husband. From October 2018 to February 2022, she starred in the reality television series Crikey! It's the Irwins alongside her two children. She announced a $8 million wildlife camping project in 2019, which was expected to draw 39,000 visitors each year. The Crocodile Hunter Lodge, a luxury hotel on the grounds of Australia Zoo, opened in 2023.

== Personal life ==
=== Marriage and family ===
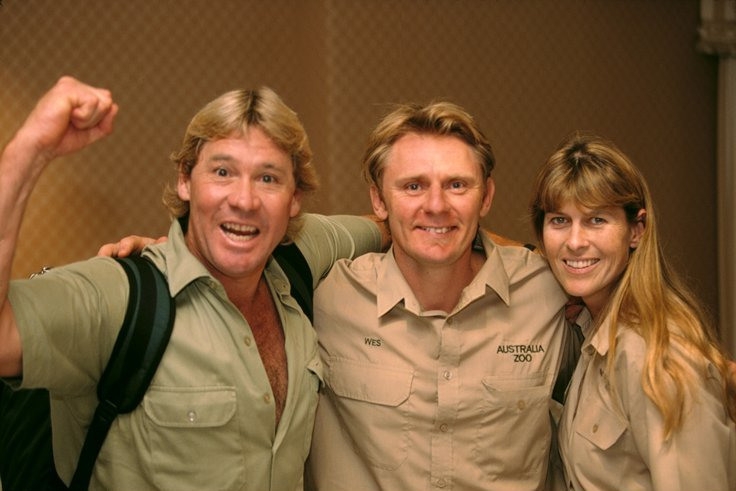
Irwin with her husband, Steve, and his best friend, Wes Mannion.

Raines met conservationist Steve Irwin on October 6, 1991, while touring wildlife rehabilitation facilities in Australia; an encounter Irwin later described as "love at first sight". Raines thought "there was no one like this anywhere in the world. [Irwin] sounded like an environmental Tarzan, a larger-than-life superhero guy". They were engaged four months later and were married on June 4, 1992, at the First United Methodist Church of Eugene.

The Irwins lived in Beerwah, Queensland and had two children together: a daughter, Bindi Sue Irwin (born July 24, 1998), and a son, Robert Clarence Irwin (born December 1, 2003). Their daughter was named after two of Steve's favorite animals: Bindi, a saltwater crocodile, and Sui, a Staffordshire Bull Terrier. Their son was named after Steve's father, Bob, and Terri's father, Clarence.

Terri became a grandmother on March 25, 2021, after Bindi gave birth to a daughter, Grace Warrior Irwin Powell. They are teetotalers, and although they were happily married, they did not wear their wedding rings for safety reasons. Irwin has not dated since her husband's death, and is not interested in pursuing another romantic relationship. She explained that while she finds it "wonderful" when widows find love again, she already experienced her "happily ever after."

=== Death of Steve Irwin ===
Irwin and her children were trekking through Cradle Mountain in Tasmania on the morning of September 4, 2006, when her husband was killed after the barb of a short-tail stingray pierced his chest. He was at Batt Reef, near Port Douglas, Queensland at the time taking part in the production of an underwater documentary. A private funeral was held five days later in Caloundra; Steve was buried in a private ceremony at Australia Zoo later that day. A public memorial service took place in Australia Zoo's 5,500-seat Crocoseum on September 30, 2006. It was broadcast live on television in Australia, the U.S., and Asia and garnered over 300 million viewers. Attendees were encouraged to make a donation to Wildlife Warriors.

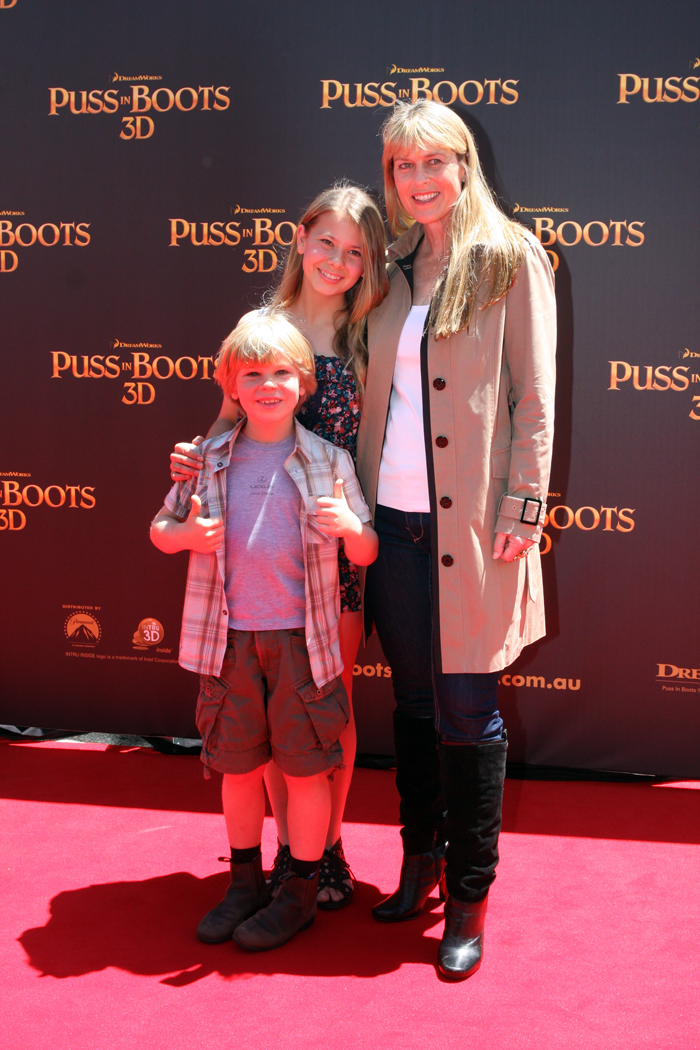
Irwin with her daughter, Bindi, and her son, Robert, in 2011.

After the memorial service, the Nine Network aired an exclusive interview between Irwin and television presenter Ray Martin. The special attracted 2.9 million viewers, and Irwin was praised for her natural and eloquent communication. On October 31, 2006, Irwin was invited to the Royal Albert Hall to present a Special Recognition Award to Sir David Attenborough at the British National Television Awards. She cited Attenborough as a great inspiration to her husband during a short speech; he, in turn, praised Steve for introducing new audiences to the natural world.

Michael Barnes, the Queensland State Coroner, reported that authorities handed the original video of Steve's death to Irwin in late December 2006. They also destroyed all copies of the fatal encounter to prevent the footage from being made public. Irwin published her memoir, My Steve, in November 2007, through Simon & Schuster Australia. She became a naturalized citizen of Australia on November 15, 2009, coinciding with the Steve Irwin Day celebrations taking place at Australia Zoo's Crocoseum.

== Honors ==
Irwin was appointed an honorary Member of the Order of Australia on March 15, 2006, for her services to wildlife conservation, the tourism industry, and support for charitable organizations. Her appointment became substantive upon her Australian naturalization ceremony. She won the Queensland Telstra Business Women's Award in 2007, and was named a finalist for the 2015 Queensland Australian of the Year.

Irwin is an honorary senior fellow of the University of the Sunshine Coast. She was presented with an honorary Doctor of Science degree from the University of Queensland for her work in conservation, research, and support for high-quality science. In 2023, she was inducted into the Queensland Business Leaders Hall of Fame in recognition of her "outstanding business leadership and for internationally recognized contributions to wildlife and habitat conservation and to Australian tourism."

== Filmography ==
=== Film ===
Year	Title	Role	Notes	Ref.
2002	The Crocodile Hunter: Collision Course	Herself	Feature film debut	
2002	The Wiggles: Wiggly Safari	Herself		
2011	Eco-Pirate: The Story of Paul Watson	Herself	Documentary film	
2017	Kangaroo: A Love-Hate Story	Herself	Documentary film	

=== Television ===
Year	Title	Role	Notes	Ref.
1997–2004	The Crocodile Hunter	Herself	Main role	
1999–2001	Croc Files	Herself	Main role	
2002–2006	The Crocodile Hunter Diaries	Herself	Main role	
2003; 2007	Australian Story	Herself	Guest appearance; 2 episodes	
2007	Ocean's Deadliest	Herself	Television documentary	
2007	My Daddy, the Crocodile Hunter	Herself	Television documentary	
2007	Planet's Best with Terri & Bindi	Herself	Television documentary	
2015; 2025	Dancing with the Stars	Herself	Guest appearance; two seasons (S21 and S34)	
2018–2022	Crikey! It's the Irwins	Herself	Main role	

== Bibliography ==
- Irwin, Terri; Irwin, Steve (2002). The Crocodile Hunter: The Incredible Life and Adventures of Steve and Terri Irwin. Penguin. ISBN 978-1-101-22009-2.
- Irwin, Terri (2007). My Steve. Simon & Schuster Australia. ISBN 978-0-731-81413-8.
