= Wildlife Warriors =

Non-profit environmental organisation

- Formation: 2002; 24 years ago
- Founders: Steve Irwin; Terri Irwin
- Type: International NGO
- Headquarters: Beerwah, Queensland, Australia
- Region served: Worldwide
- Chair: Terri Irwin
- Parent organization: Australia Zoo
- Website: wildlifewarriors.org.au

Wildlife Warriors, originally called the Steve Irwin Conservation Foundation, is an international non-profit organisation that aims to involve and educate the public in the protection of injured, threatened or endangered wildlife. Founded in 2002 by Steve and Terri Irwin, its mission statement is "to be the most effective wildlife conservation organisation in the world through the delivery of outstanding outcome-based projects and programs, inclusive of humanity."

== History ==
In 1991, conservationist Steve Irwin took over the management of Australia Zoo from his parents, who founded the zoo in 1970. He volunteered for the Queensland Government's East Coast Crocodile Management program beforehand, capturing over 100 crocodiles and relocating some of them at the family zoo. He also helped to establish the International Crocodile Rescue, a unit within the zoo that rescued saltwater crocodiles that were threatened by human interference.

After Steve married American naturalist Terri Raines in her home state of Oregon in June 1992, they received a telephone call concerning an abnormal crocodile in Far North Queensland. Television producer John Stainton, a close friend of the Irwins, convinced them to let a crew film their work. They flew to the region to capture the reptile, but learned that it had been shot and killed by poachers upon arrival. The Irwins were "devastated," but successfully tracked down the crocodile's mate. Footage from the Irwins' impromptu honeymoon was later aired in Australia as a wildlife documentary television series titled The Crocodile Hunter (1996–2004). It spawned a media franchise that was broadcast in over 130 countries and reached 500 million people worldwide.

The Irwins established the Steve Irwin Conservation Foundation in 2002 to use the earnings they made from The Crocodile Hunter and other prominent appearances to fund international wildlife conservation initiatives. Australia Zoo serves as its major sponsor, covering all of the administrative costs and providing essential support when necessary. The zoo also provided office spaces, consulting staff for various projects, and the opportunity to promote the organisation's work to visitors and patrons for fundraising purposes. After its founding, the organisation was renamed to Wildlife Warriors; a term created by Steve to describe his work and philosophy. Its logo features a human footprint surrounded by the pugmarks of five endangered species: the cassowary, the saltwater crocodile, the Asian elephant, the Ethiopian wolf and the Bornean orangutan.

On 4 September 2006, Steve was killed by a stingray injury while filming an underwater documentary. Over 30,000 international mourners offered donations to Wildlife Warriors. Michael Hornby, its executive manager at the time, reported that donations exceeded A$2 million – enough to fund its animal hospital and international programs for six to nine months. Steve's public memorial service was made into a DVD, which was released across Australia on 14 October; all proceeds went towards Wildlife Warriors. $1 from every sale of singer-songwriter John Williamson's compilation album of the same was donated to the organisation. The Irwins' daughter, Bindi, committed 10 percent of the wages she earned from her television program Bindi the Jungle Girl (2007–2008) to Wildlife Warriors.

=== Objectives ===
- To protect and enhance the natural environment
- To provide information and education to the public and raise awareness of wildlife issues
- To undertake biological research
- To research, recommend and act in the protection of threatened or endangered species
- To enter into co-operative arrangements with like-minded organisations

== Projects ==
- The Australian Wildlife Hospital & Wildlife Rescue Unit, Australia
- Elephant conservation, Asia
- Tiger conservation, Sumatra
- Rhino conservation, South Africa
- Cheetah conservation, South Africa
- Grey nurse shark research & conservation, Australia
- Whale research, United States
- Community Education (international)
- Koala research, Qld, Australia
- Crocodile research, Steve Irwin Wildlife Reserve, Qld, Australia

== Leadership and ambassadors ==
Wildlife Warriors operates as a private company limited by guarantee, with a board of directors determining the organisation's activities. Australia Zoo owner and chairwoman Terri Irwin, chief executive officer Bindi Irwin, and zoo manager Robert Irwin are among the board members. Although it is an independent organisation, Wildlife Warriors is supported by the Queensland Government and the Sunshine Coast Council. Corporate supporters include RACQ and Coca-Cola Europacific Partners.

Global ambassadors for Wildlife Warriors include:

- Christine Anu, singer-songwriter
- Shirley Ballas, dancer and instructor
- Jimmy Barnes, singer
- Beau Bridges, actor
- Adam Copeland, professional wrestler and actor
- John Edward, television personality and psychic medium
  - Olivia Edward, actress
- Dean Geyer, singer-songwriter and actor
- Lynn Gilmartin, television presenter
- Paul Harragon, rugby league footballer
- Adam Hills, comedian and television presenter
- Erin Holland, singer and television presenter
- Derek Hough, dancer and choreographer
- Val Lehman, actress and director
- Daniel Merrett, Australian rules footballer
- Rove McManus, comedian and television presenter
- Keo Motsepe, dancer and choreographer
- Tasma Walton, actress and writer
- John Williamson, singer-songwriter
