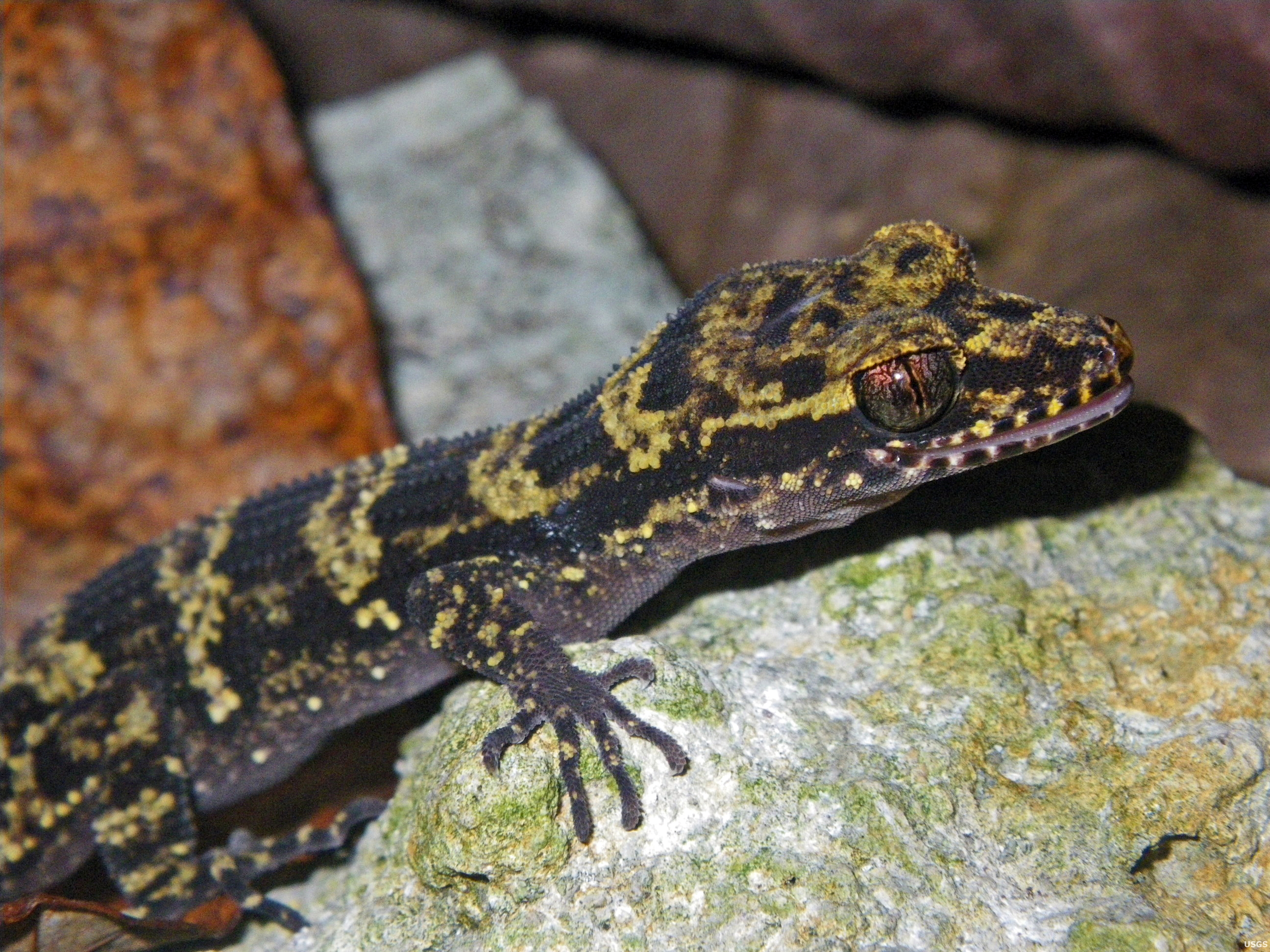

Conservation status
- Data Deficient (IUCN 3.1)

Scientific classification
- Kingdom: Animalia
- Phylum: Chordata
- Class: Reptilia
- Order: Squamata
- Suborder: Gekkota
- Family: Gekkonidae
- Genus: Nactus
- Species: N. kunan

Binomial name
- Nactus kunan Zug and Fisher, 2012

= Nactus kunan =

Species of lizard

Nactus kunan is a species of slender-toe geckos described in 2012, and indigenous to the Admiralty Islands of Papua New Guinea. It is brightly coloured, and its specific name means "bumblebee" in the local Nali language.

== Distribution and habitat ==
The species is only known from two specimens collected from a village on Manus Island, the Admiralty Islands. It is expected to occur more widely in the highlands of Manus Island where forest patches remain. The specimens were collected from village house structures in small openings in the forest at night.

== Description ==
Nactus kunan is brightly coloured with a pattern of broad alternating dark (black or dark brown) and golden yellow bands on neck, trunk, and tail. It also has a unique head pattern among Nactus: a sharply contrasting yellow crown and eyelids on a black background.

Nactus kunan appears to be bisexual, unlike Nactus pelagicus, the only other Nactus species of the Admiralty Islands. The holotype, an adult female, measured 57 mm (2.2 in) in snout–vent length, with an equally long tail. The other known individual was a juvenile female. Its duller colouration suggests that the species undergoes an ontogenetic colour shift at maturation.

== Bibliography ==
- Armstrong, Dave (2012-04-19). "New gecko species discovered in Papua New Guinea - Nactus kunan or bumblebee gecko". Earth Times.
- Lies, Elaine (2012-04-19). ""Bumblebee" gecko discovered in Papua New Guinea: USGS". Reuters.
- "New 'Bumblebee' Gecko Discovered in Papua New Guinea". United States Geological Survey. 2012-04-18.
- Rice, Doyle (2012-04-18). "New gecko species discovered in Papua New Guinea". Science Fair. USA Today.
- Dell'Amore, Christine (2012-04-23). "New Species: Bumblebee Gecko Strikingly Striped". National Geographic. National Geographic Society. Archived from the original on April 26, 2012.
