= Nactus kamiali =

Scientific classification
- Kingdom: Animalia
- Phylum: Chordata
- Class: Reptilia
- Order: Squamata
- Suborder: Gekkota
- Family: Gekkonidae
- Genus: Nactus
- Species: N. kamiali

Binomial name
- Nactus kamiali Zug, 2020

Species of lizard

The Kamiali slender-toed gecko (Nactus kamiali) is a species of lizard in the family Gekkonidae. It is endemic to Papua New Guinea.
