= Nactus septentrionalis =

Scientific classification
- Kingdom: Animalia
- Phylum: Chordata
- Class: Reptilia
- Order: Squamata
- Suborder: Gekkota
- Family: Gekkonidae
- Genus: Nactus
- Species: N. septentrionalis

Binomial name
- Nactus septentrionalis Zug, 2020

Species of lizard

The North Coast Papuan slender-toed gecko (Nactus septentrionalis) is a species of lizard in the family Gekkonidae. It is found in Papua New Guinea and Indonesia.
