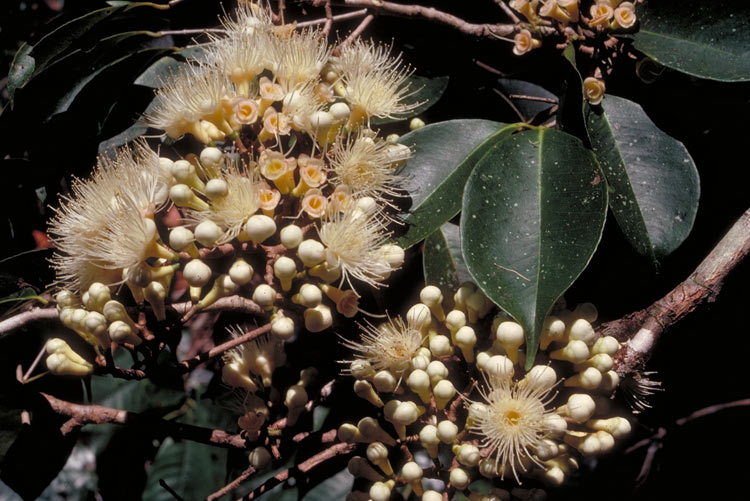
- Flowers

Conservation status
- Least Concern (NCA)
- Least Concern (IUCN 3.1)

Scientific classification
- Kingdom: Plantae
- Clade: Tracheophytes
- Clade: Angiosperms
- Clade: Eudicots
- Clade: Rosids
- Order: Myrtales
- Family: Myrtaceae
- Genus: Syzygium
- Species: S. sayeri

Binomial name
- Syzygium sayeri (F.Muell.) B.Hyland

Synonyms
- Eugenia sayeri F.Muell.; Syzygium dictyophlebium Merr. & L.M.Perry

= Syzygium sayeri =

Pink satinash

Species of flowering plant

Syzygium sayeri, commonly known as pink satinash, is a species of flowering plant in the family Myrtaceae which is native to northeastern Queensland, Australia, and New Guinea.

== Description ==
Syzygium sayeri is a large tree growing up to 35 m (115 ft) tall with flaky bark and buttress roots.

== Taxonomy ==
This species was first described by the Queensland botanist Bernard Hyland in 1983, and published in the Australian Journal of Botany.

=== Etymology ===
The species epithet sayeri is in honour of the Australian naturalist William A. Sayer who collected the type specimen.

== Distribution and habitat ==
The native range of the pink satinash is from the area around Rossville southwards as far as the Paluma Range National Park, including the Atherton Tableland. It grows in well developed rainforest on various soils, often near watercourses, at elevations from sea level to 800 m (2,600 ft).

== Gallery ==
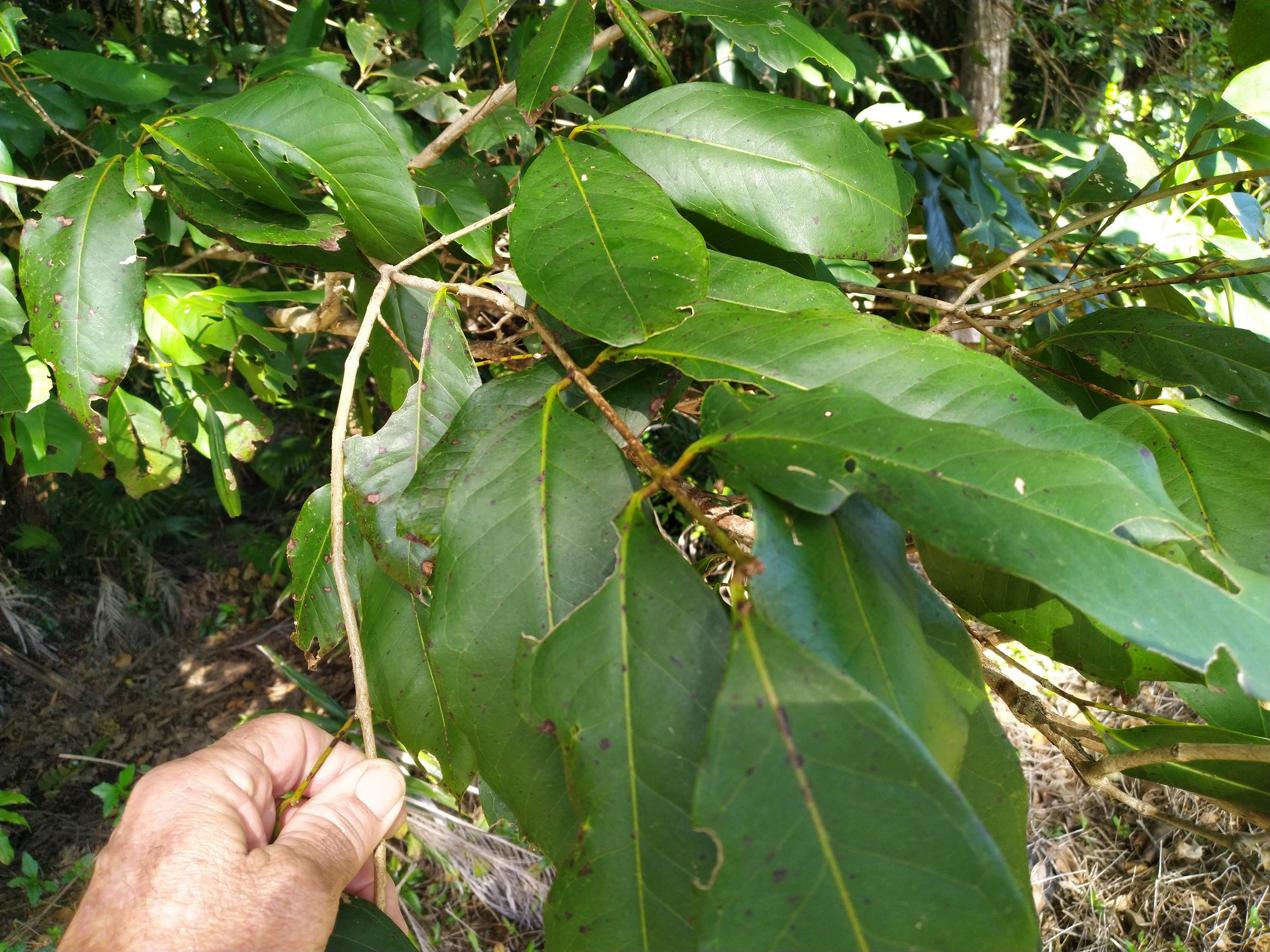
Foliage

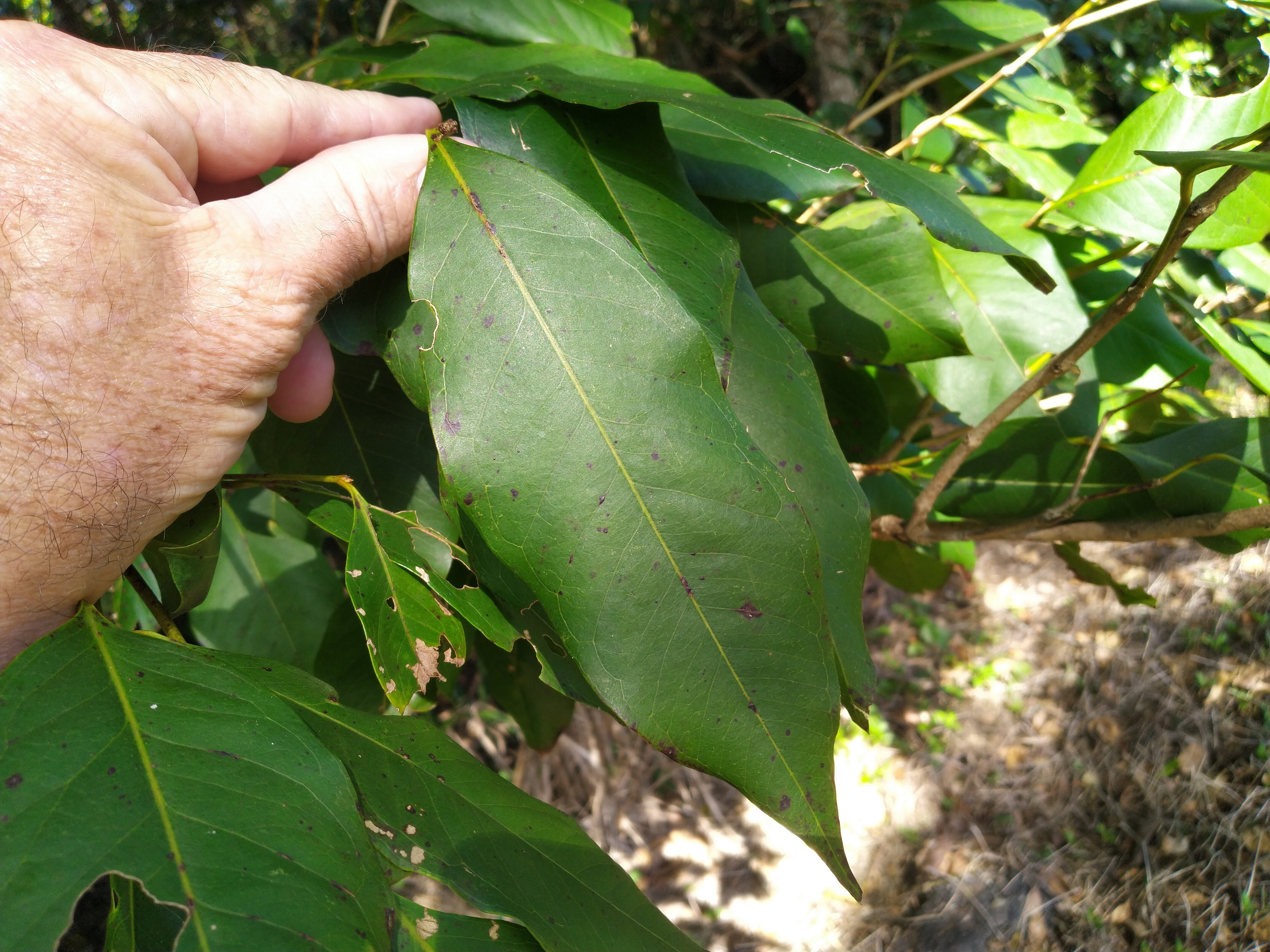
Leaf, showing long "drip tip"

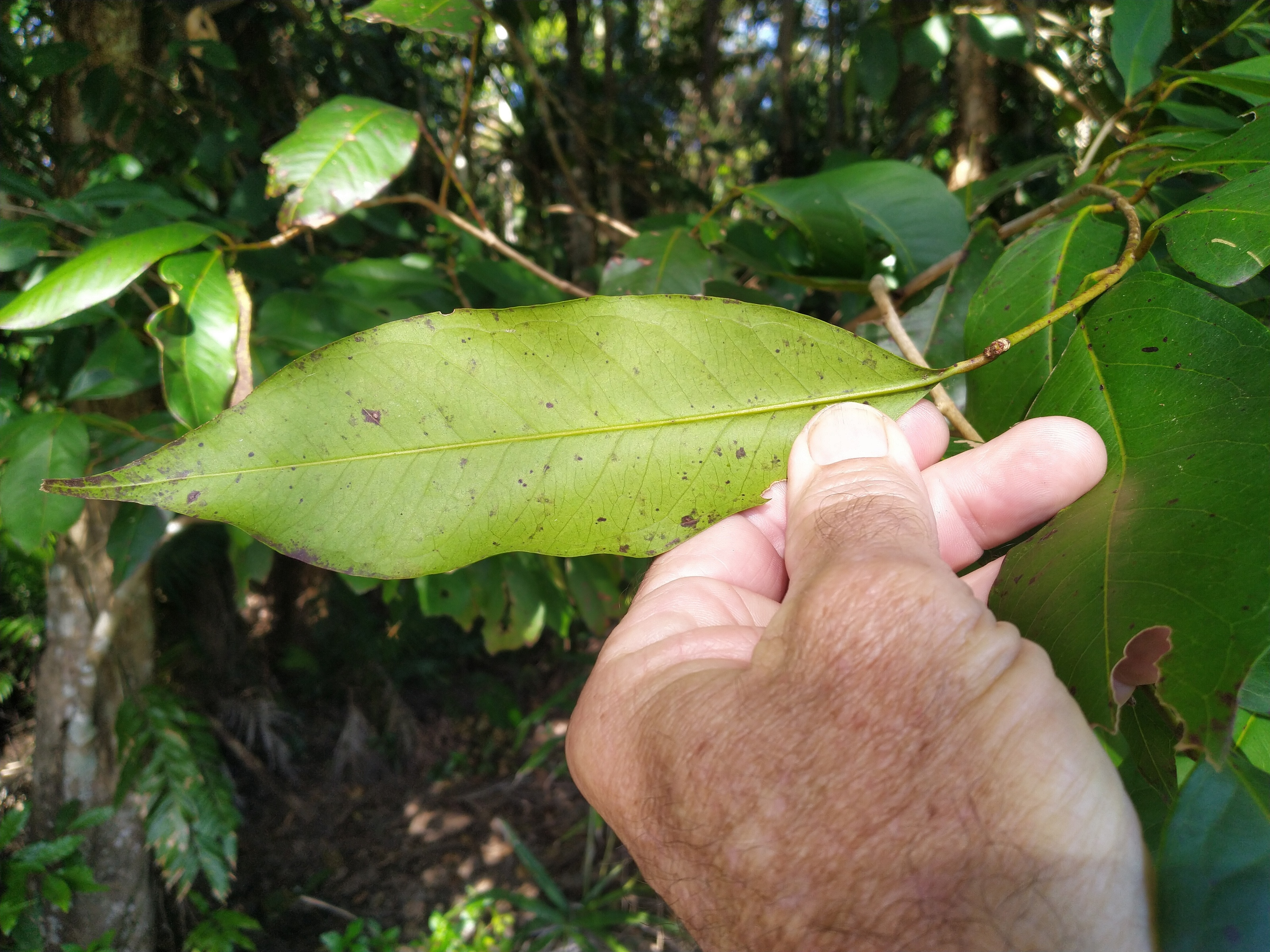
Underside of leaf

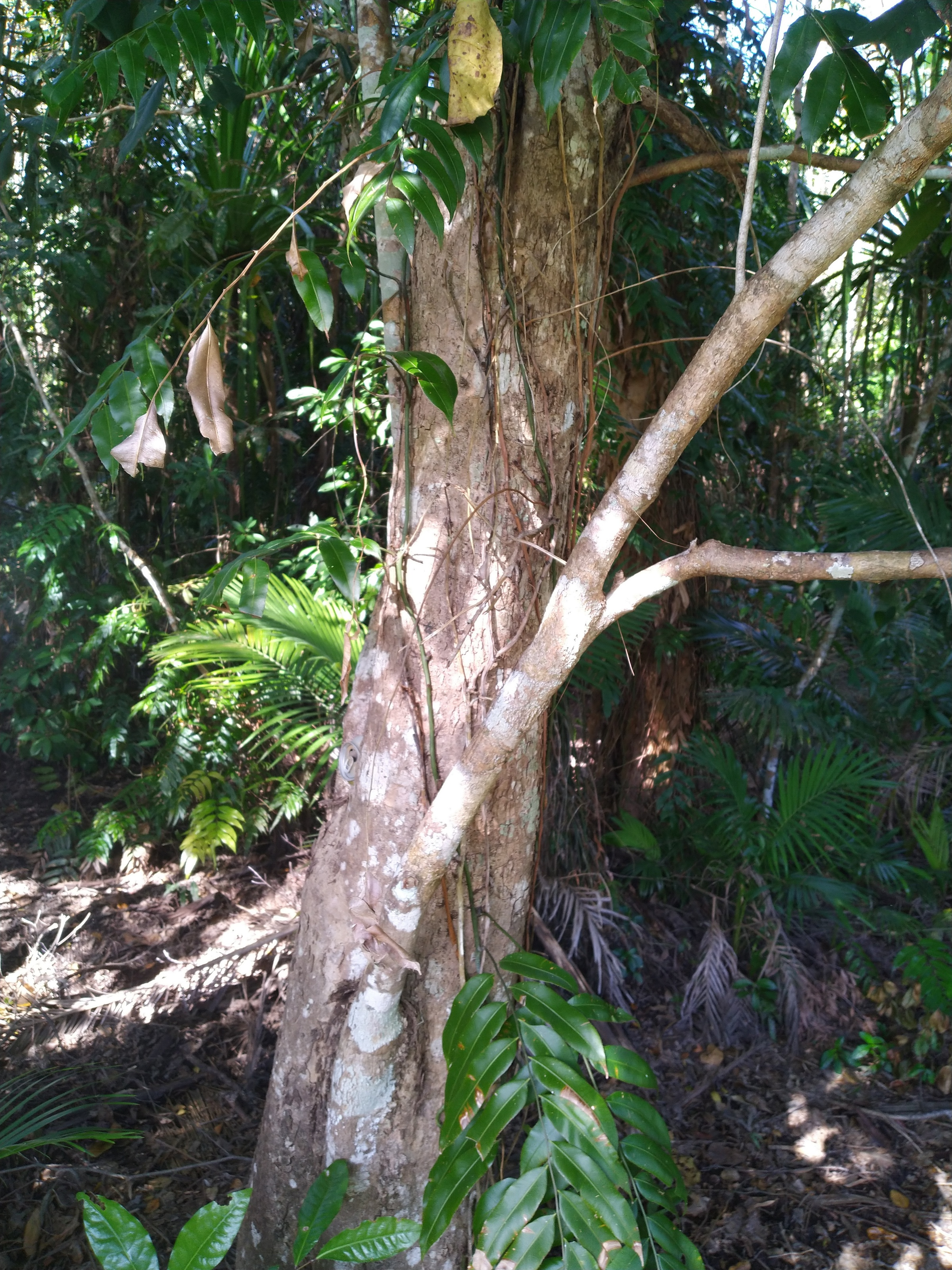
Trunk

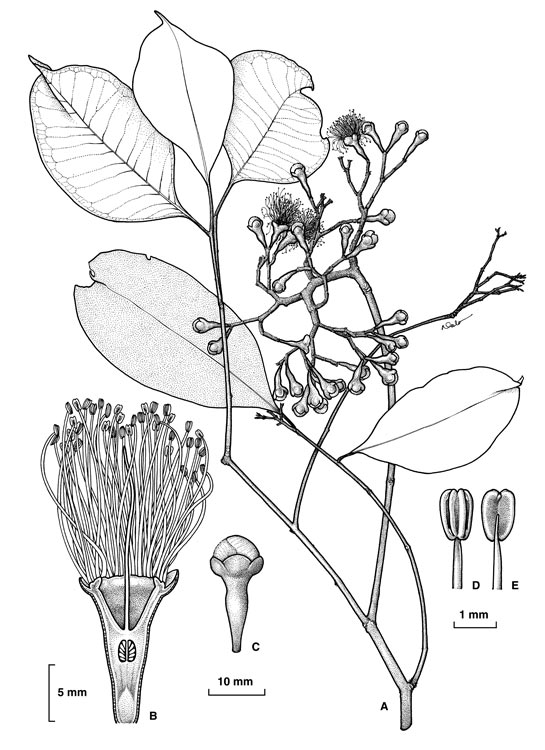
Botanical sketch
