= Collingwood Water Race =

- Location within Queensland Location within Australia
- 15.789°S 145.256°E
- Location: Monkhouse Timber Reserve, Rossville, Shire of Cook, Queensland, Australia

History
- Design period: 1900 - 1914 (early 20th century)
- Built: 1902 - 1906

Queensland Heritage Register
- Official name: Collingwood Water Race, Annan River Company Water Race
- Type: state heritage (built, archaeological)
- Designated: 13 April 2006
- Reference no.: 602257
- Significant period: 1900s-1920s (fabric, including timber repairs); 1906-1920s (historical use)
- Significant components: tunnel - water, ventilation shaft - storm water/drainage

Collingwood Water Race is a heritage-listed aqueduct at Monkhouse Timber Reserve, Rossville, Shire of Cook, Queensland, Australia. It was built from 1902 to 1906. It is also known as Annan River Company Water Race. It was added to the Queensland Heritage Register on 13 April 2006.

== History ==
Construction of the Collingwood Water Race commenced in 1902 for the Collingwood Company but was halted within the year. The project was re-commenced and completed in 1905–1906 for the Annan River Company. On completion, the race was 11 kilometres (6.8 mi) in length. The purpose of this project was to enable sluicing of tin bearing deposits on the northern face of Mount Walker in the Annan River Tin field.

During the 1870s gold dominated mining activity in northern Queensland and few prospectors were interested in base metals. However, in the late 19th century there was a general shift in North Queensland exploration and development activity towards tin, lead, silver and copper. Tin mining was particularly attractive as it employed mining and crushing techniques similar to those used for gold. Tin was first worked commercially in North Queensland by the Chinese. Probably as early as the wet season of 1876–7 and certainly by 1878, declining gold yields had encouraged Chinese miners to test the tin deposits on Granite Creek and Cannibal Creek, southeast of Maytown.

Tin discoveries in 1880 on the banks of the Wild River led to the development of Herberton and from here fossickers fanned out reporting new finds every year. Discoveries were made at locations nearby throughout the 1880s, then Charles Ross discovered tin in 1885 at Mount Amos, south of Cooktown, and then at Mounts Hartley, Leswell and Romeo on the upper Annan River. North of Cooktown tin sluicing commenced on the Annan River in 1885, and a small rush followed in 1886.

For a few years, the rugged country of the Annan River's upper waters was able to sustain a small but vibrant tin mining industry, with lucrative tin deposits obtained directly from underground lodes, or from the creek beds and banks by sluicing in the fast flowing streams. However, this was labour-intensive and dangerous work. In addition, high cartage rates on stores was a drawback to tin mining in the district.

As the accessible deposits were exhausted along the lower banks of the creeks, miners turned to the more difficult extraction of tin bearing deposits of sand and gravel from the higher terraces of the creek banks. This form of mining demanded alternative sources of water to that of the creeks below. The higher terraces could only be worked economically by bringing in water from a higher point, which then could be used to wash off the alluvial overlying the tin-bearing wash by carrying it over the face of the banks. This process necessitated expensive outlay in the construction of races to procure water for operations. Races fed water into pipes, which narrowed into a nozzle which forced water out into a strong stream. This was then used to blast the overburden down into the river or the tin-bearing wash down into the creek.

The most impressive of these structures was the Annan River Company's water race. Construction had commenced in 1902 for the Adelaide-based Collingwood Company, which planned to divert water from the southern face of Mount Walker over a distance of 11 kilometres (6.8 mi) to its leases on the northern face of the mountain. Nearly 40 men were employed on the construction. However, the Collingwood Company quickly ran out of working capital and construction ceased. A Melbourne-based company, the Annan River Tin Mines Company NL, resurrected the project in 1905, commencing work on 22 November. More than 150 men were employed to erect fluming over valleys and to construct a road up the range. In one place the race was tunnelled through a hill. Completion of the project in 1906 enabled the Annan River Company to commence sluicing on the former Collingwood leases and at Mount Leswell. Hydraulic sluicing began in January 1907 with water coming from the head of Parrot Creek.

However, in 1909 the Annan River Company withdrew and for some years the race was let on tribute to four miners: D Francis, M Davies, F Trevorrow and R Yeatman.

Floods damaged the race in 1910 and in 1911–12 the Annan River Company spent £14,000 installing new sluicing boxes and repairing the race and fluming. Operations were successful in 1913 after sluicing commenced on 13 January, treating 35,000 cubic yards (27,000 m^{3}) of earth from the Collingwood face for 23.5 long tons (23.9 t) of tin valued at £2,967 and 33,500 cubic yards (25,600 m^{3}) of earth from the Daly face yielded 32 long tons (33 t) of tin valued at £3,884.

Sluicing took place for about five months each year. A new sluicing plant and pump were installed in 1914, along with 1,830 metres (6,000 ft) of 50-centimetre (20 in) diameter spiral riveted pipes. A sawmill was set up on site to cut timber for the race. Shortage of water prevented continuous operations in 1915 and because of falling tin prices and lack of labour the whole of the plant was dismantled in September 1916 and removed to Cooktown.

Extensive repairs to the race were undertaken in 1917 and following bushfires in 1918, 5,500 feet (1,700 m) of timber was used to repair the damage. Seven point five long tons (7.6 t) of tin was obtained in 1918, but lack of labour was a problem for future operations. In 1919 the race was diverted to the Winifred United Claim but only 19 hundredweight (2,100 lb) of tin was produced from 800 long tons (810 t) of dirt.

A cyclone in 1920 caused extensive damage to the race, necessitating the renewal of 3,050 metres (10,010 ft) of timber at a cost of £700. Sluicing commenced on 20 March 1920 and continued until the water ran out on 11 August 1920. Twelve long tons (12 t) of tin were obtained in this period. The Collingwood leases were then let on tribute again, but in 1921 the tunnel through the hill collapsed due to heavy rain.

The Annan River Company sold out to J Kerr, J Baker and R Yeatman in September 1921. The new owners spent four months repairing the race. However production was declining year by year and there was little activity after 1923.

== Description ==
During its operation, the water race extended from an intake dam near the head of Parrot Creek, northward around the western side of Mount Walker, to sluicing faces south of Rossville, a distance of approximately 11 kilometres (6.8 mi) by map. The length of surviving race is approximately 8 kilometres (5.0 mi).

In 2005, the Collingwood Water Race was located and surveyed in three sections: near its start point; at its midpoint high on the south-western slopes of Mount Walker above Shipton's Flat; and at its lower end on the north-western slopes of Mount Walker. All of the surveyed sections of the race were covered with medium to dense rainforest.

The race now comprises on average a 1-metre-deep (3.3 ft) ditch about 1.8 metres (5 ft 11 in) in width with a 2-metre-wide (6.6 ft) bank on the downhill side made up of the excavated material - earth and small rocks. However, in some places the ditch is up to 2 metres (6 ft 7 in) deep. Sections where the race crosses gullies have been bridged with timber fluming. In the surveyed sections a number of the timber upright supports for the fluming remain standing, but no fluming has survived.

There is also evidence of the use of explosives during construction and/or maintenance of the race in the form of blasting scars on rock faces along the race.

In the midsection of the race (north of Shipton's Flat) there is some evidence of stone pitching.

A second race of slightly smaller dimensions is constructed a consistent 20 metres (66 ft) below the main race to catch overflow or seepage.

While the intake point at the head of Parrot Creek was not surveyed, approximately 600 metres (2,000 ft) north-west the race passes through a bedrock tunnel situated in dense rainforest. The form of the race changes into a deep cutting at the tunnel entrance, about 15 metres (49 ft) long and 3 metres (9.8 ft) deep. The section of tunnel that remains intact is about 30 metres (98 ft) long, 1.5 metres (4 ft 11 in) wide and 1.2 metres (3 ft 11 in) high. A rectangular shaft, presumably an air intake shaft, marks the point at which the tunnel has become blocked and is impenetrable. Further along the race to the west, sections of the tunnel have collapsed entirely.

The lower end of the race was recorded at a point about 60 metres (200 ft) past where it is crossed by a four-wheel drive track on the northern side of Mount Walker. Evidence of the race close to Rossville is indiscernible and either has been obliterated or was never constructed formally, as the natural contour of the hillside would have taken the water down to the sluice face.

== Heritage listing ==
Collingwood Water Race was listed on the Queensland Heritage Register on 13 April 2006 having satisfied the following criteria.

The place is important in demonstrating the evolution or pattern of Queensland's history.

The Collingwood Water Race is significant in Queensland's history as one of the longest water races recorded in North Queensland. It was constructed in 1902 and 1905–1906 to enable sluicing of tin bearing deposits on the northern face of Mount Walker in the Annan River Tin Field. The Collingwood Water Race is important in demonstrating the evolution of early 20th century tin-mining practices in Queensland.

The place demonstrates rare, uncommon or endangered aspects of Queensland's cultural heritage.

The Collingwood Water Race is the only Queensland race recorded which was constructed with a second race below to catch overflow. The extent of the race (originally 11 kilometres (6.8 mi) in length, now 8 kilometres (5.0 mi) surviving) is unusual also, most races being of much shorter lengths.

The place is important in demonstrating the principal characteristics of a particular class of cultural places.

The water race is representative of practices used for the extraction of base metal resources in north Queensland and is significant as an early example of the effort, both manual and financial, that was applied to mine base metals in a remote location reliant on seasonal rains. Many of the principal characteristics of the race survive, including the two channels or ditches (surviving for close to its original 10 kilometres (6.2 mi) extent), excavated material forming banks on the downhill side of the race, evidence of blasting along the sides of the race, a rock tunnel, a ventilation shaft to the tunnel, stone pitching, and remnant flume supports and fluming.

The place is important because of its aesthetic significance.

Natural and cultural landscape values combine along the route of the water race from its head on Parrot Creek to its end point on the northern face of Mount Walker above the Rossville town site, engendering aesthetic significance.
