= Nactus aktites =

Scientific classification
- Kingdom: Animalia
- Phylum: Chordata
- Class: Reptilia
- Order: Squamata
- Suborder: Gekkota
- Family: Gekkonidae
- Genus: Nactus
- Species: N. aktites

Binomial name
- Nactus aktites Zug, 2020

Species of lizard

Nactus aktites, the Madang coastal slender-toed gecko, is a species of lizard in the family Gekkonidae. It is endemic to Papua New Guinea.
