= Nactus arceo =

Scientific classification
- Kingdom: Animalia
- Phylum: Chordata
- Class: Reptilia
- Order: Squamata
- Suborder: Gekkota
- Family: Gekkonidae
- Genus: Nactus
- Species: N. arceo

Binomial name
- Nactus arceo Zug, 2020

Species of lizard

The Morotai slender-toed gecko (Nactus arceo) is a species of lizard in the family Gekkonidae. It is endemic to Indonesia.
