= Nactus alotau =

Nactus aktites

Scientific classification
- Kingdom: Animalia
- Phylum: Chordata
- Class: Reptilia
- Order: Squamata
- Suborder: Gekkota
- Family: Gekkonidae
- Genus: Nactus
- Species: N. alotau

Binomial name
- Nactus alotau Zug, 2020

Species of lizard

The southern forest slender-toed gecko (Nactus alotau) is a species of lizard in the family Gekkonidae. It is endemic to Papua New Guinea.
