= Annan River Bridge =

Heritage – listed road bridge in Cookstown, Queensland, Australia

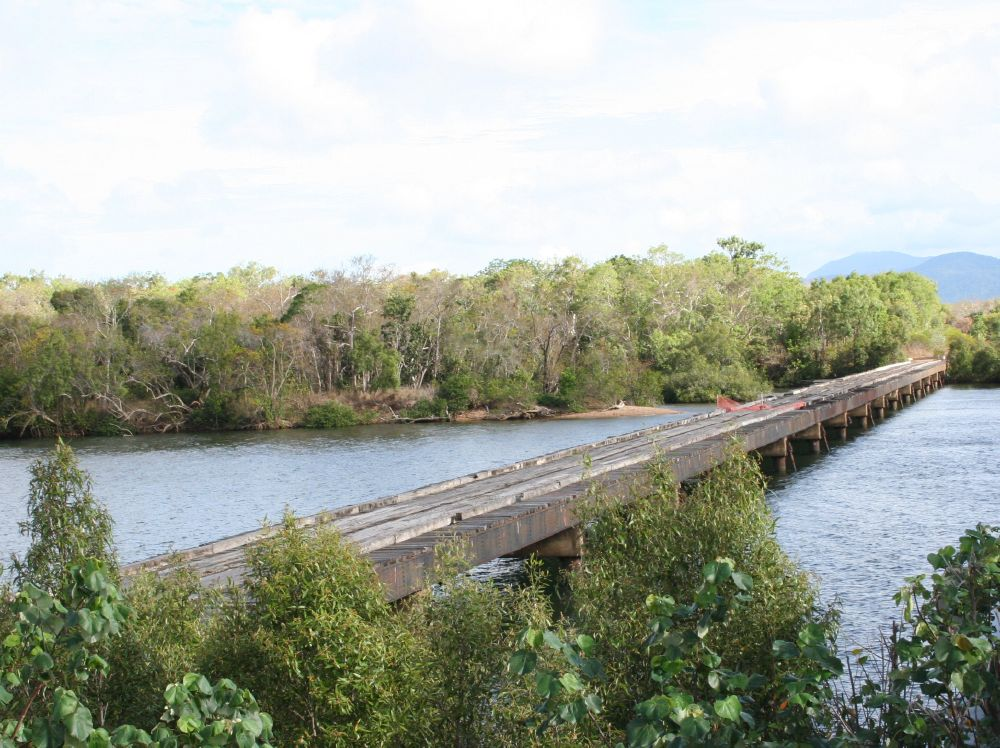
- Annan River Bridge, 2008

- Location within Queensland Location within Australia
- 15.5236°S 145.2239°E
- Location: over Annan River at Development Road, Cooktown, Shire of Cook, Queensland, Australia

History
- Design period: 1870s – 1890s (late 19th century)
- Built: 1886–1889

Site notes
- Architect: John Henry Daniells

Queensland Heritage Register
- Official name: Annan River Bridge
- Type: state heritage (built)
- Designated: 21 October 1992
- Reference no.: 600417
- Significant period: 1880s (fabric)
- Significant components: pier/s (bridge)
- Builders: George Herbert Royce & Co.

Annan River Bridge is a heritage-listed road bridge over the Annan River at Development Road, Cooktown, Shire of Cook, Queensland, Australia. It was designed by John Henry Daniells and built from 1886 to 1889 by George Herbert Royce & Co. It was added to the Queensland Heritage Register on 21 October 1992.

== History ==
The Annan River Bridge was designed by John Henry Daniells, Engineer for Bridges (1884–1889), and constructed between 1886 and 1889, and was important in servicing the developing industry in the Rossville and Bloomfield areas. Following the establishment of the overland route to Cairns, the importance of the Annan River Bridge decreased. Construction of the Annan River Bridge was a controversial and prolonged project mainly due to misinformation, remoteness, and challenging conditions. It became necessary to modify the bridge when it was discovered that the site proved unsuitable for a screw piling technique.

Cooktown was founded in October 1873 as the Endeavour River port for the Palmer River goldfields, and within six months had 20 restaurants, 12 large and 20 smaller stores, 6 butchers, 5 bakers, 3 tinsmiths, and chemists, fancy goods shops, watchmakers, bootmakers, and saddlers; 65 publican's licenses had been issued for the Cooktown-Palmer River district, with 30 more applied for by April 1874. Two Cooktown newspapers were established in 1874, and the town was declared a municipality on 5 April 1876. The 1880s saw a number of infrastructure developments in the district such as the Cooktown to Laura railway built in 1884–88. Road developments were also required to upgrade the local roads between the Palmer River goldfields, the Annan River tin mines, and the wharves at Cooktown.

Construction of the bridge appears to have been first discussed in 1883. In December 1883 the Daintree Divisional Board requested that the new Griffith ministry comply with the decision of the previous McIlwraith government to fund the construction of a bridge over the Annan River south of Cooktown. While urgently required, the project was beyond the resources of the local authority:

"As for the necessity of this Bridge, little need be said, it would afford a safe crossing at all times over a tidal River which at present is only fordable at dead low water once or twice a day according to the tides, and then it is both difficult and dangerous..."

In April 1884, the Daintree Divisional Board upgraded their initial estimate of £4000 to £5000 after flooding had made it evident that many additional piles and supports must be used to render the structure permanent. A telegram from Public Works on 16 April 1884 informed the Daintree Divisional Board that a departmental officer would be sent to take levels and prepare designs prior to any tenders being called.

By early January 1885, Daniells had inspected potential bridge sites on the Annan River. Daniells recommended the site known as the "Old Crossing", saying it offered good holding for piers, being affordable at low water. Engineering drawings were drafted and on 30 May through to June 1885, the Government Gazette and local newspapers advertised the tender notice for the supply and erection of an iron bridge over the Annan River near Cooktown.

GH Royce and Co, Sydney and London, were contracted to build the bridge which was officially opened on 13 February 1889. GH Royce and Co were awarded two separate contracts. The first contract, for which Royce tendered £8201 was to provide all wrought and cast iron, steel and gunmetal for the piers and superstructure of an iron bridge over the Annan River and "to deliver the whole, complete, free on the Wharf at Cooktown". The second contract for which Royce tendered £10213 was for the construction of the bridge which was to be completed within three months of the receipt of the ironwork. Daniells stated that construction would commence after the wet season and the bridge was expected to be open for traffic on 12 November 1886. The bridgework for the Annan River Bridge was ordered from manufacturers in England. Other ironwork for the project was ordered from W Robertson's Victoria Foundry in Mackay. All the ironwork was unloaded at Cooktown by 29 July 1886.

The project was subject to a variety of delays both prior to and during the construction of the bridge. The most serious delays occurred after the commencement of construction and were mostly due to misinformation received by Daniells regarding the suitability of the site as a location for a bridge of screw-pile construction. After receiving a sample of the strata in September 1886, Daniells responded to site superintendent Mansfield that "such strata is evidently not fit to screw into, other means must be adopted and I sent him instructions to have the screw blades cut off some of the cylinders, the bottoms serrated..." Daniells' alternative method involved sinking sleeve cylinders and excavating the disturbed material by hand. Most of the excavation was undertaken by divers in extremely arduous conditions, including the presence of crocodiles. Daniells stated that it is very difficult to induce men to undertake work at all. Difficulties were also encountered during the North Queensland wet season. Added to this was flood damage to the construction site in early 1888.

The completed bridge was finally opened on 13 February 1889. The Cooktown Independent wrote that about 150 Cooktownites joined another hundred people at Mr Ross's hotel or at the new bridge nearby decorated with a profuse display of British and colonial bunting. An unusual collapsible handrail which could be laid flush with the deck during floods, was originally installed. It appears to have been removed sometime before 1905. The single-wire cable handrail was threaded through swivelling uprights and connected to a windlass.

In 1947 the Annan River Bridge was integrated into a proposed road link between Cooktown and Cairns. The first exploratory trip by District Engineer RD Gallop took about four days. Development of the road followed relatively quickly. By 1950 the Mulligan Highway had been gazetted and progressive upgrading has continued. Bridges were required at several major rivers including the East Normanby (1951), McLeod River (1952), the "Little Annan" (1956) and the Palmer River (1970). The "Big Annan" crossing utilised the original plate and girder-bridge completed in 1889.

=== Maintenance ===
Maintenance work to the bridge has been carried out on numerous occasions. In 1962 an investigation of the bridge was undertaken and a specification for major repairs was produced. Work included removal of concrete headstock encasement where necessary, replacement of bolts joining headstocks to piles, replacement of corroded bolts and nuts to pile sections above low water mark, and the installation of new wales, braces, and bolts.

In 1969 further assessment of the Annan River Bridge was undertaken. A report was produced the following year which recommended "extensive treatment" being carried out. The piles were also considered to be a major concern. The bridge was thought to be in good condition above water line, however, below water line was not so good. It was noted in the report that existing girders required immediate cleaning and painting. The need for a new bridge "adjacent to the existing structure" was also recognised.

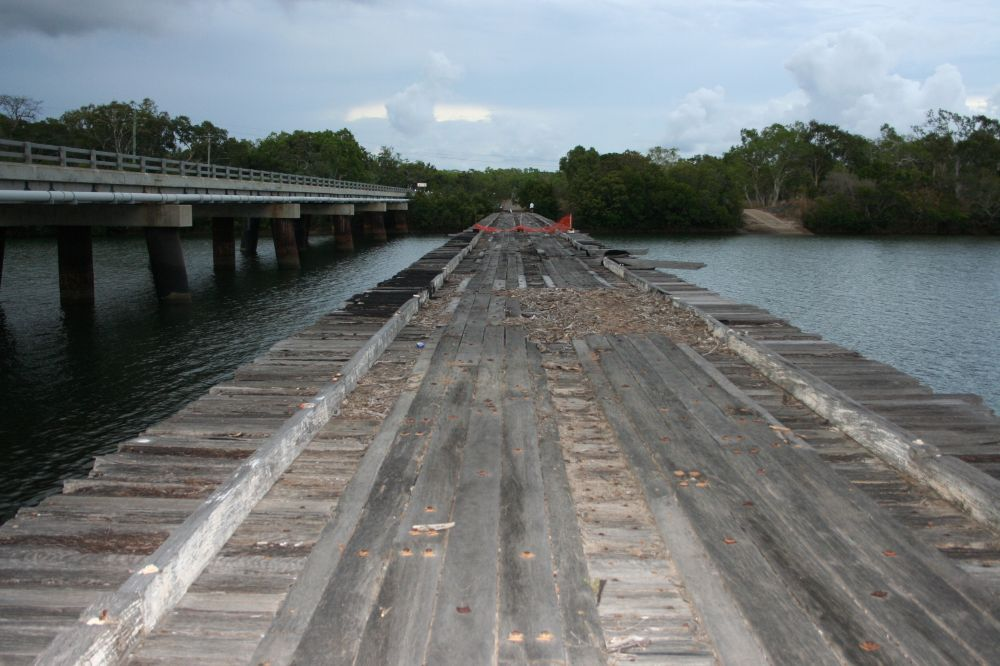
The new and old bridges over the Annan River as seen from the south bank of the river, 2008

Following an inspection in 1992, it was reported that significant areas braces and girders were subject to erosion. It was noted that the re-encasement of headstocks was deteriorating and the concrete had been poorly compacted. In late 1998 engineering staff from the Main Roads Department noted that the bridge was in need of priority attention. There was also a concern that major flooding could severely damage the bridge. It was not considered economically desirable to repair the existing bridge and preliminary designs of a replacement bridge were initiated. Attention also turned to determining an appropriate management approach for the old bridge.

Funding for a new bridge was announced in 2000. The new bridge was built parallel and west of the original bridge.

== Description ==
=== Superstructure ===
The Annan River Bridge is 275 metres (902 ft) long with 18 metal box girder spans each 15.3 metres (50 ft) long. The two end spans are 12.4 metres (41 ft) long, having been reduced in the 1970s. Each span incorporates five wrought iron plate girders, 0.76 metres (2 ft 6 in) deep, spaced at 1.52-metre (5 ft 0 in) intervals. Originally 5.6 metres (18 ft) wide, the bridge is now 6.1 metres (20 ft) wide and in recent years was fitted with timber kerbs 3.7 metres (12 ft) apart and vehicle running strips each 940 millimetres (37 in) wide and 610 millimetres (24 in) apart to accommodate single lane traffic.

The three inner girders are conventional being 0.76 metres (2 ft 6 in) deep and built up of a web plate, four angles and top and bottom cover plates. The outer girders are less conventional, with the angles n one side of the web left off to provide a flush face. The 0.3125 inches (7.94 mm) (a standard recommendation in the early twentieth century) web plates are fastened with 8 rivets to the 100-by-75-by-9.5-millimetre (3.94 in × 2.95 in × 0.37 in) vertical angles. The horizontal angles are 100 by 75 by 16 millimetres (3.94 in × 2.95 in × 0.63 in) and secured with an additional 13 or 14 rivets per web plate. Corners are bolted through with 28-millimetre (1.1 in) bolts.

=== Substructure ===
The original headstocks, now encased in concrete, are 610-millimetre (24 in) deep wrought iron girders of similar construction to the deck girders. Cast iron piles 2.4 metres (7 ft 10 in) and 1.2 metres (3 ft 11 in) sections and bolted through either internal or external flanges are used to support the headstocks. The piles are 610 millimetres (24 in) in diameter with 25-millimetre (0.98 in) thick wall. Attempts have been made, unsuccessfully, to fill the piles with concrete.

Originally Wales (horizontal braces) and diagonal braces were installed on the piers. These braces have been replaced by a pair of 150-by-75-millimetre (5.9 in × 3.0 in) rolled steel channels acting as the wale brace and a single diagonal consisting of a pair of 100-by-12-millimetre (3.94 in × 0.47 in) plates.

Rakers were installed on the outer face of each pile. Manufactured from 125-millimetre (4.9 in) wrought iron, they are secured to the wrought iron "helmet" at the end of the headstocks. Several are detached due to corrosion while others show extensive loss of material at the inter-tidal zone.

== Heritage listing ==
Annan River Bridge was listed on the Queensland Heritage Register on 21 October 1992 having satisfied the following criteria.

The place is important in demonstrating the evolution or pattern of Queensland's history.

Construction of the Annan River Bridge in 1886–89 was a major element in the development of the Cooktown hinterland. Prior to the construction of the bridge major difficulties occurred in accessing the tin fields around Rossville and agricultural developments around Bloomfield district, key areas in the development of northern Queensland.

The place demonstrates rare, uncommon or endangered aspects of Queensland's cultural heritage.

The Annan River Bridge is a rare example of a plate girder and screw pile bridge. It is also an uncommon example of a low-level bridge. Low-level bridges are being progressively replaced with those at much higher levels in order to avoid road closures during floods. The Annan River Bridge is one of the last remaining bridges of its type in Australia. At 275 metres (902 ft) in length, it is also one of the longest structures of its type.

The place has potential to yield information that will contribute to an understanding of Queensland's history.

The Annan River Bridge is significant for its potential to yield further information about modifications to screw piles to allow for sleeve-sinking construction. The structure, particularly that part of the bridge which is underwater, may contribute to increasing knowledge of a major, controversial engineering project of the late nineteenth century.

The place is important in demonstrating the principal characteristics of a particular class of cultural places.

The Annan River Bridge is characteristic of other plate girder bridges consisting of a vertical web plate. Riveted horizontal pairs of angles form flanges to which are attached vertical angles which transmit the load to supports.

The place is important because of its aesthetic significance.

With its flat deck, sheer length and low profile the Annan River Bridge exhibits distinctive aesthetic qualities.

The place is important in demonstrating a high degree of creative or technical achievement at a particular period.

Innovative redesign was found to be necessary when it was discovered that the site was unsuitable for a bridge of screw-pile construction. Adaptations over an extended period of construction had to be made to allow for sleeve sinking facilities.

The place has a strong or special association with a particular community or cultural group for social, cultural or spiritual reasons.

The Annan River Bridge continues to be a popular recreational fishing spot for both locals and tourists in the area.

The place has a special association with the life or work of a particular person, group or organisation of importance in Queensland's history.

The Annan River Bridge is significant for its association with JH Daniells, Queensland Engineer for Bridges, 1884–1889.
