= Kuku Nyungkal =

Australian aboriginal group

- Aka: Kokonyungal (Tindale), Gugu Njunggal (AIATSIS), Kuku-Nyungkul (SIL)
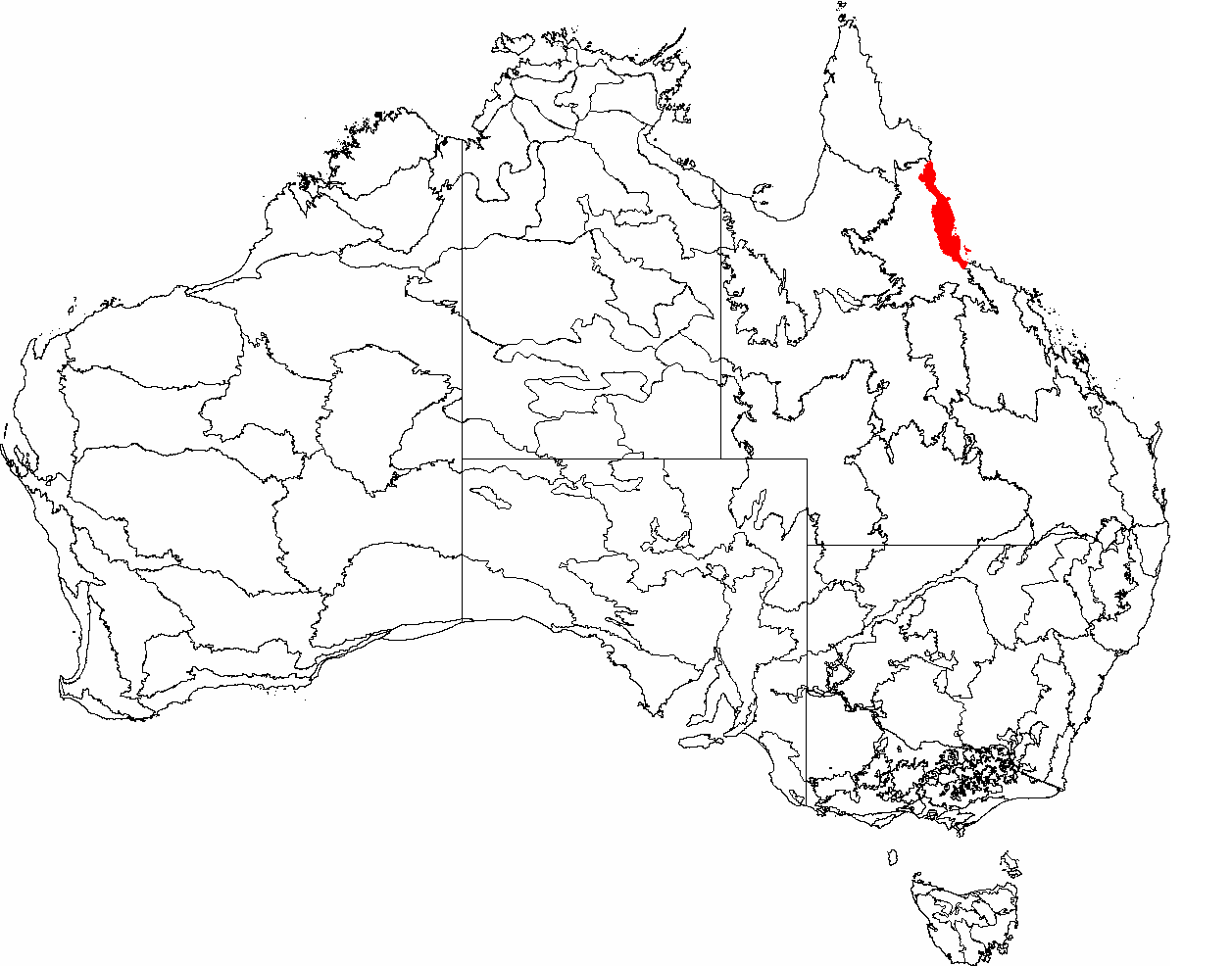
- Wet Tropics BioRegion

Hierarchy
- Language Family: Pama–Nyungan
- Language Branch: Yalandyic
- Language Group: Kuku Yalanji
- Dialect: Kuku Nyungkal
- Estates: Kuna; Ngulungkaban; Muwan; Jiraraku; Wulumuban; Ngarrimurril; Nyambilnyambil; Yulbu; Yumal; Kabu

Area (approx. 800 km²)
- BioRegion: Wet Tropics
- Location: Far North Queensland
- Coordinates: 15°40′S 145°15′E
- Mountains: Black Mountain (a.k.a. Kalkajaka); Mount Amos (a.k.a. Muku Muku; Mount Finnigan
- Rivers: Annan River (a.k.a. Yuku-Baja); Upper Normanby River
- Creeks: Russell Creek (a.k.a. Ngarrilmurril); Banana Creek
- Other Geological: Shiptons Flat (a.k.a. Kuna); Kings Plain (a.k.a. Dandi); Cedar Bay (a.k.a. Mangkalba); Hope Islands
- Settlements: Helenvale (a.k.a. Bibikarrbaja), Rossville (a.k.a. Ngulangaban)

Notable Individuals
- Noel Pearson
- Henrietta Marrie

The Kuku Nyungkal people (or Annan River Tribe) are a group of Aboriginal Australians who are the original custodians of the coastal mountain slopes, wet tropical forests, waters, and waterfalls of the Upper Annan River, south of Cooktown, Queensland

All Kuku Nyungkal people share in common social descent from ancestors who back to time immemorial have transmitted, from generation to generation, their Kuku Nyungkal dialect, knowledge, names (for people, places, and things), traditions, heritage, plus lore

In 1995 Queensland's Aboriginal Land Tribunal, relying on Kuku Nyungkal genealogical material submitted to them, estimated the total population of Kuku Nyungkal people to be "at least 900" (not including those people who had married into Kuku Nyungkal families)

== Country ==
Norman Tindale's (1974) Catalogue of Australian Aboriginal tribes identifies Kokonyungal country as covering from "Annan River; south to Rossville; west to Annan-Normanby Divide"

== Lore ==
Kuku Nyungkal local lore for their country has been described to anthropologist Dr Christopher Anderson as follows

The Upper Annan River area was divided into [between nine and twelve ] patrilineal clan estates. Each estate was based on a discrete part of the Annan drainage basin... These ... estates formed a linguistically and culturally distinctive bloc over which travel and access to resources were relatively free for any person associated with the estates

here was a tendency for all adult men to attempt to stay on their own patrilineal estates ... [and] the land-using groups consisted ... of people related in a variety of ways....based on a ‘core element’ consisting of a focal male, known as maja maja, his wives and children. The maja maja were identified with particular semi-permanent camps within their own patrilineal clan estate. These men would try to stay as much as possible at their own camps within their own estates, for it was there that their power was greatest

The maja maja were particular individuals of high achieved status and power ... who by virtue of their age, their knowledge of and supposed connections with the supernatural forces emanate in the ngujakura (law’ or ‘dreaming’)... were charged with the ‘minding’ and ‘looking after’ of their respective countries and the people associated with them. They ensured the health and well being in the human world and order in the natural world – particularly the steady supply of resources from the land .. by overseeing the maintenance of law’ by everyone. The breaking of social and cultural regulations was seen almost always to have ecological consequences, and moral knowledge and subsistence knowledge were seen as inextricably linked

With their perceived special relationship to the yirru or ‘nature-spirit’ which was said to live in the ground at certain sites ...the old men were able to ... sanction or punish ... breaches of the moral code

== History ==
Prior to the 1880s, Kuku Nyungkal people had, since time immemorial, possessed, occupied, used and enjoyed their country in accordance with their lore as follows:

Our Bama lore was strong in the past years ... The lore was made and enacted by Elders .. Everyone has responsibility for passing the lore down to the next generation and for carrying it out ... Some lagoons, swamps, springs and beaches are special story places with lores associated with them. Some are sickness places, some are healing places, some are special places of birds, or feeding areas for other animals. There are special places for hunting and gathering seasonal food such as crab, mussels, bird eggs and certain fish etc

In 1885 tin was discovered at Mount Amos, within Kuku Nyungkal country, following which Kuku Nyungkal people first experienced a small scale "invasion" by tin miners, then decades of sustained tin mining of their country

Looking back, in retrospect, Kuku Nyungkal people living in the area, reflected on the tin mining era, leading anthropologist Dr Christopher Anderson to conclude:

A major effect of tin mining was the disturbance if not outright destruction of ... sites of significance to Kuku Nyungkal people. Almost all important sites in this region are (or were) associated with waterholes and/or waterfalls.

Much of the illness and accidents which Europeans suffered in this area were attributed by Kuku Nyungkul to these actions. Violent thunderstorms or big winds, as well as the failure of certain food resources to appear properly or on time were also said to have stemmed from these actions.

The disturbances which tin-mining brought to these sites could possibly also have had some kind of spiritual or psychological ill-effect for Kuku-Nyungkal people. Because the sites were foci for power of which old mean were meant to have exclusive control, the flouting of site entry restrictions and site disturbance by Europeans ... had important effects

Over the decades that followed Queensland authorities felt it necessary to progressively encourage and often forcibly remove Kuku Nyungkal people from the tin mining areas and associated external settlement, into lands specially reserved for the purpose such as Ayton, Hopevale, Yarrabah, and other reserves.

During the 1950s Lutheran Church of Australia properly established an Aboriginal mission on the Bloomfield River, into which the remnant Kuku Nyungkal population still living on their country were moved. The Lutheran Church described the situation as follows:

The Bama [trans. people] are deeply hurt (the degree can hardly be described) that across the years they have been 'evicted' from their traditional lands by the encroachment of white settlers. From their traditional hunting grounds they were gradually herded into camps along or near the Bloomfield River. Finally they have been constricted within the confines of a 250 acre reserve at Wujal Wujal. The depth of their feelings was variously expressed: "We are like a crane standing on one leg (no room for two feet on the ground) on a little island" : "we are like animals in a wild cage"

== Present ==
By 1995, one century after the initial "invasion" by tin miners, an Aboriginal Land Tribunal inquired into the extent to which Kuku Nyungkal traditions, beliefs, and people had been impacted by the colonization of their country. At that time Kuku Nyungkal representatives submitted, and the Tribunal agreed:

Aboriginal culture in south eastern Cape York Peninsula has changed considerably since the arrival of the first European land visitor in 1872 ... Technological innovations and introductions have altered many aspects of Kuku-Nyungkul life and their economic and political system has also been affected by the social forces of a dominant way of life imposing itself on a previously independent people. Living away from country in a centralised community much of the time has also meant changes. The culture of the Kuku-Nyungkul people is not the same as it was one hundred years ago.

On 9 December 2007, the Kuku Nyungkal people were included within an overarching Federal Court native title determination in which their legal right to their own lands and waters was retrospectively acknowledged, and new exclusive rights to possess, occupy, use and enjoys some of their original lands along the Annan River was restored

== See also ==
- Kuku Nyungkal language
