= Nactus erugatus =

Scientific classification
- Kingdom: Animalia
- Phylum: Chordata
- Class: Reptilia
- Order: Squamata
- Suborder: Gekkota
- Family: Gekkonidae
- Genus: Nactus
- Species: N. erugatus

Binomial name
- Nactus erugatus Zug, 2020

Species of lizard

The Milne Bay smooth-tailed slender-toed gecko (Nactus erugatus) is a species of lizard in the family Gekkonidae. It is endemic to Papua New Guinea.
