= Black Mountain National Park =

Black Mountain National Park may refer to:

- Kalkajaka National Park (formerly Black Mountain (Kalkajaka) National Park), protected area in the State of Queensland, Australia, 25 km south west of Cooktown
- Jigme Singye Wangchuck National Park (formerly Black Mountains National Park), protected area in central Bhutan
