= Nactus notios =

Scientific classification
- Kingdom: Animalia
- Phylum: Chordata
- Class: Reptilia
- Order: Squamata
- Suborder: Gekkota
- Family: Gekkonidae
- Genus: Nactus
- Species: N. notios

Binomial name
- Nactus notios Zug, 2020

Species of lizard

The southern mountains slender-toed gecko (Nactus notios) is a species of lizard in the family Gekkonidae. It is endemic to Papua New Guinea.
