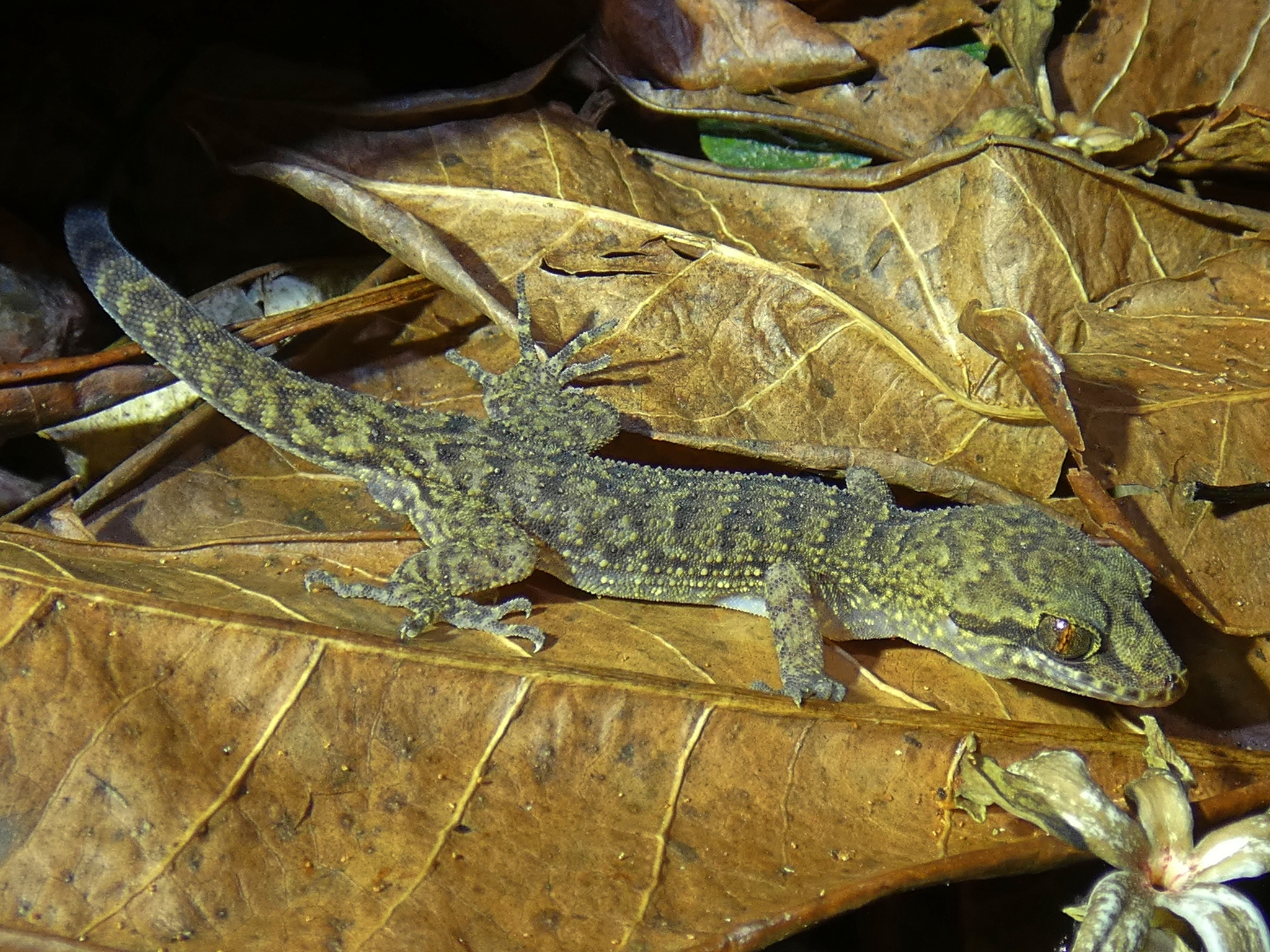
- Nactus cheverti

Conservation status
- Least Concern (IUCN 3.1)

Scientific classification
- Kingdom: Animalia
- Phylum: Chordata
- Class: Reptilia
- Order: Squamata
- Suborder: Gekkota
- Family: Gekkonidae
- Genus: Nactus
- Species: N. cheverti

Binomial name
- Nactus cheverti (Boulenger, 1885)

Synonyms
- Hetoronota [sic] marmorata Macleay, 1877; Gymnodactylus cheverti Boulenger, 1885 (nomen novem); Nactus cheverti — Zug, 1998

= Nactus cheverti =

Species of lizard

Nactus cheverti, also known commonly as Chevert's gecko, the Fitzroy Island gecko, and the southern Cape York nactus, is a species of lizard in the family Gekkonidae. The species is endemic to Queensland in Australia.

== Etymology ==
The specific name, cheverti, refers to the ship Chevert which William John Macleay used on his 1875 expedition to New Guinea.

== Habitat ==
The preferred natural habitat of N. cheverti is forest.

== Reproduction ==
N. cheverti is oviparous.
