= Nactus sphaerodactylodes =

Conservation status
- Least Concern (IUCN 3.1)

Scientific classification
- Kingdom: Animalia
- Phylum: Chordata
- Class: Reptilia
- Order: Squamata
- Suborder: Gekkota
- Family: Gekkonidae
- Genus: Nactus
- Species: N. sphaerodactylodes

Binomial name
- Nactus sphaerodactylodes Kraus, 2005

Species of lizard

Nactus sphaerodactylodes is a species of lizard in the family Gekkonidae. It is endemic to Papua New Guinea.
