= Nactus multicarinatus =

Conservation status
- Least Concern (IUCN 3.1)

Scientific classification
- Kingdom: Animalia
- Phylum: Chordata
- Class: Reptilia
- Order: Squamata
- Suborder: Gekkota
- Family: Gekkonidae
- Genus: Nactus
- Species: N. multicarinatus

Binomial name
- Nactus multicarinatus (Günther, 1872)
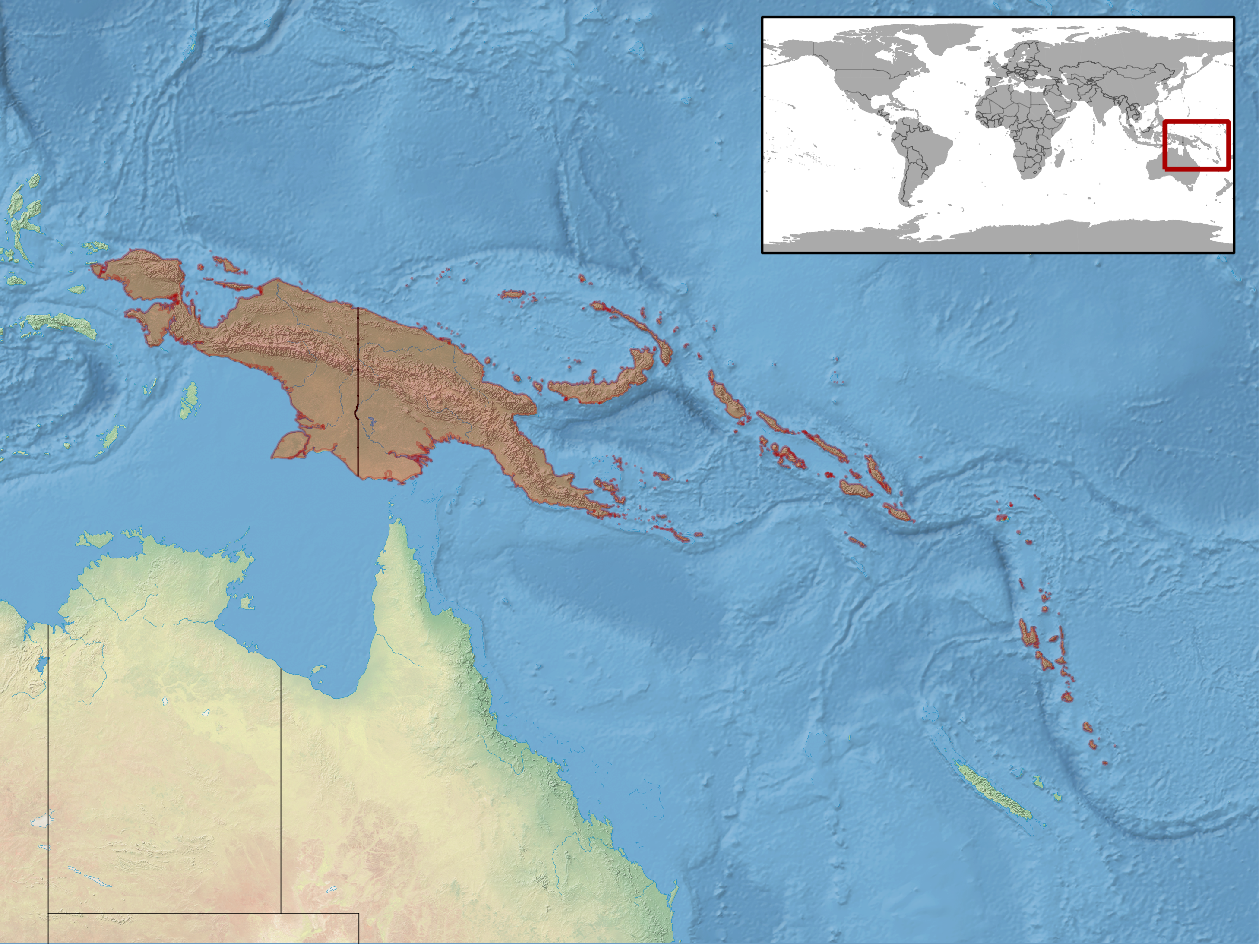

Synonyms
- Gymnodactylus multicarinatus

Species of lizard

Nactus multicarinatus is a species of lizard in the family Gekkonidae. It is found in the Tuamotu Archipelago, Fiji, Rotuma, Samoa, Solomon Islands, New Caledonia, and Vanuatu.
