= Nactus arfakianus =

Scientific classification
- Kingdom: Animalia
- Phylum: Chordata
- Class: Reptilia
- Order: Squamata
- Suborder: Gekkota
- Family: Gekkonidae
- Genus: Nactus
- Species: N. arfakianus

Binomial name
- Nactus arfakianus Meyer, 1874

Species of lizard

The Arafak slender-toed gecko (Nactus arfakianus) is a species of lizard in the family Gekkonidae. It is endemic to Indonesia.
