= Liburnascincus artemis =

Conservation status
- Least Concern (IUCN 3.1)

Scientific classification
- Kingdom: Animalia
- Phylum: Chordata
- Class: Reptilia
- Order: Squamata
- Suborder: Scinciformata
- Infraorder: Scincomorpha
- Family: Eugongylidae
- Genus: Liburnascincus
- Species: L. artemis

Binomial name
- Liburnascincus artemis Hoskin & Couper, 2015

Species of lizard

Liburnascincus artemis is an endemic species that inhabits Queensland, Australia.
