= Struck Island =

Island in northeast Australia

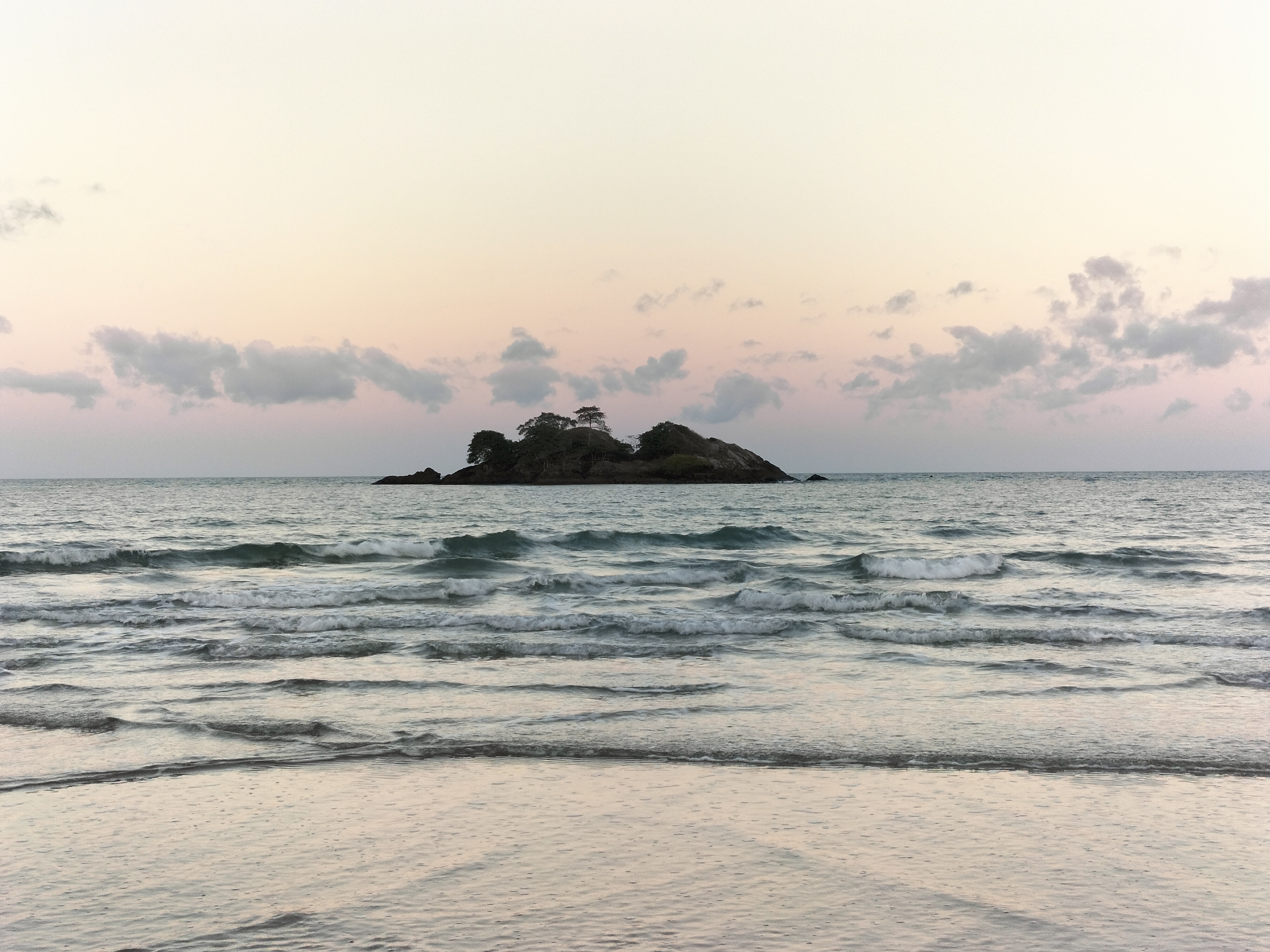
- Interactive map of Struck Island

Geography
- Location: Far North Queensland
- Coordinates: 16.1711°S 145.44722°E
- Area: 0.0037 km^{2} (0.0014 sq mi)

Administration
- Australia
- State: Queensland

Struck Island is an island in the Shire of Douglas, Far North Queensland, Australia.

== Geography ==
The island is in Alexandra Bay about 20 kilometres (12 mi) north of the mouth of the Daintree River. It is offshore (and within) the locality of Thornton Beach. The island has an area of 3,701 square metres (0.3701 ha; 0.915 acres). It is about 40 kilometres (25 mi) north of Port Douglas. It is within the Hope Islands National Park. It is administered by the Great Barrier Reef Marine Park Authority and the Queensland Parks and Wildlife Service.

== Aboriginal culture ==
The Kuku Yalanji people have a tribal belief that Thornton Beach is a place which can stimulate fertility. It was once the practice for the young women of the tribe to spend time on Thornton Beach before they went to an offshore island (Struck Island) to receive their tribal scars and other marks of womanhood and marriageability.
