= Nactus heteronotus =

Scientific classification
- Kingdom: Animalia
- Phylum: Chordata
- Class: Reptilia
- Order: Squamata
- Suborder: Gekkota
- Family: Gekkonidae
- Genus: Nactus
- Species: N. heteronotus

Binomial name
- Nactus heteronotus (Boulenger, 1885)

Species of lizard

Nactus heteronotus, also known as central savanna slender-toed gecko, is a species of lizard in the family Gekkonidae. It is endemic to Papua New Guinea.
