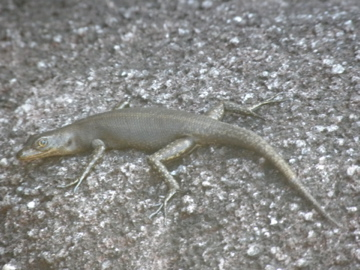

Conservation status
- Least Concern (IUCN 3.1)

Scientific classification
- Kingdom: Animalia
- Phylum: Chordata
- Class: Reptilia
- Order: Squamata
- Suborder: Scinciformata
- Infraorder: Scincomorpha
- Family: Eugongylidae
- Genus: Liburnascincus
- Species: L. scirtetis

Binomial name
- Liburnascincus scirtetis (Ingram & Covacevich, 1980)
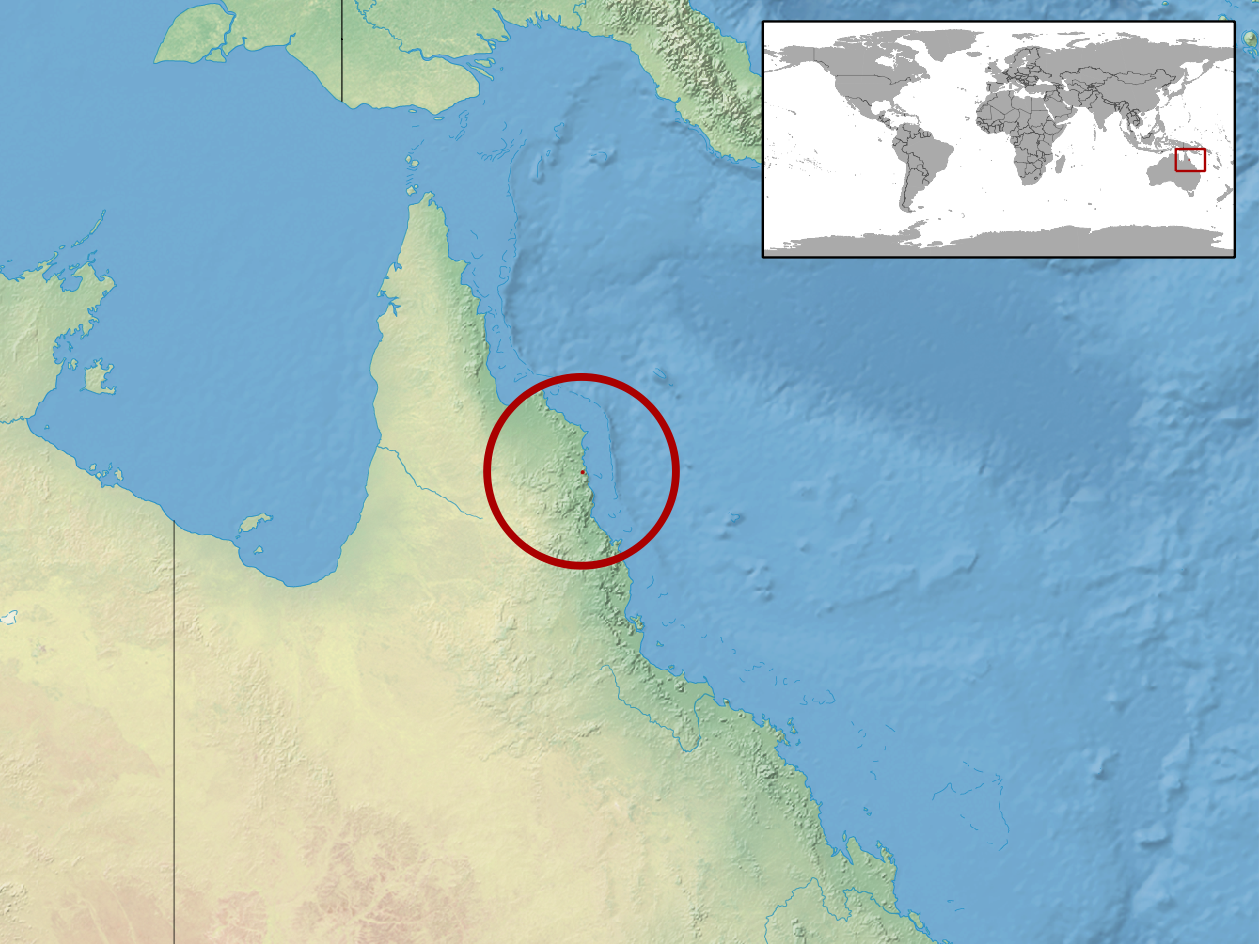

Synonyms
- Carlia scirtetis Ingram & Covacevich, 1980

= Black Mountain rainbow-skink =

Species of lizard

The Black Mountain rainbow-skink (Liburnascincus scirtetis) is an endemic species that inhabits a total of 6 km^{2} (2.3 sq mi) on Kalkajaka in Queensland, Australia. The species is 70 mm long with a weight between 4 and 6 grams. This species goes through oviparous reproduction.
