= Liburnascincus coensis =

Conservation status
- Least Concern (IUCN 3.1)

Scientific classification
- Kingdom: Animalia
- Phylum: Chordata
- Class: Reptilia
- Order: Squamata
- Suborder: Scinciformata
- Infraorder: Scincomorpha
- Family: Eugongylidae
- Genus: Liburnascincus
- Species: L. coensis

Binomial name
- Liburnascincus coensis (Mitchell, 1953)

Species of lizard

Liburnascincus coensis, the Coen rainbow-skink, is an endemic species that inhabits Queensland, Australia.
