= Annan River National Park =

National park in Queensland, Australia

- IUCN category II (national park)
- Location within Queensland
- Location: Queensland
- Nearest city: Cooktown
- Coordinates: 15°33′29″S 145°12′52″E
- Area: 86.9 km^{2} (33.6 sq mi)
- Established: 2006
- Governing body: Queensland Parks and Wildlife Service

Annan River National Park (also known as Yuku Baja-Mulika) is a national park on Cape York Peninsula in Far North Queensland, Australia. The Annan River from which the park gets its name, marks the northern and western extent of the park. To the east of the park is Walker Bay in the Coral Sea. The park was gazetted in 2006.

It was created to preserve the diversity of lowland vegetation types in the area. These include marine wetlands, eucalypt woodlands and the semi-evergreen vine thickets of the Dowling Range. It also protects places and species of cultural significance to the tradition owners.

== Geography ==
The 8,690 hectares (21,500 acres) park includes several peaks such as Mount Ellen, Mount Mcintosh, Dowlings Hills and Camp Hill. It is bisected by the Mulligan Highway. Annan River National Park lies within the Cape York Peninsula and Wet Tropics of Queensland bioregions.

== Management ==
The park is jointly managed by the Queensland Parks and Wildlife Service and the Yuku Baja-Muliku Land Trust.

== Environment ==
There are three wetland areas in the park, covering a 5.6 square kilometres (2.2 sq mi) or 6.5% of the park's area.

The park provides habitat for the Bennett's tree-kangaroo. The red-tailed Burdekin plum is a fruit-bearing tree of cultural significance.

== Facilities ==
The park has no facilities.

== See also ==
- Protected areas of Queensland
