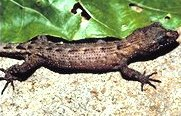
- pelagic gecko (Nactus pelagicus)

Scientific classification
- Kingdom: Animalia
- Phylum: Chordata
- Class: Reptilia
- Order: Squamata
- Suborder: Gekkota
- Family: Gekkonidae
- Subfamily: Gekkoninae
- Genus: Nactus; Kluge, 1983

= Nactus =

Genus of lizards

Nactus is a genus of geckos, lizards in the family Gekkonidae. The genus is endemic to Oceania.

== Species ==
The following 35 species are recognized as being valid, and some species have recognized subspecies.

- Nactus acutus Kraus, 2005
- Nactus aktites Zug, 2020 – Madang coastal slender-toed gecko
- Nactus allenallisoni Zug, 2020 – Madang slender-toed gecko
- Nactus alotau Zug, 2020 – southern forest slender-toed gecko
- Nactus amplus Zug, 2020 – Louisiade giant slender-toed gecko
- Nactus arceo Zug, 2020 – Morotai slender-toed gecko
- Nactus arfakianus Meyer, 1874 – Arafak slender-toed gecko
- Nactus cheverti (Boulenger, 1885) – Chevert's gecko, southern Cape York nactus
- Nactus chrisaustini Zug, 2020 – Milne Bay pygmy slender-toed gecko
- Nactus coindemirensis Bullock, Arnold & Bloxam, 1985 – lesser night gecko
- Nactus eboracensis (Macleay, 1877)
- Nactus erugatus Zug, 2020 – Milne Bay smooth-tailed slender-toed gecko
- Nactus fredkrausi Zug, 2020 – Kraus's giant slender-toed gecko
- Nactus galgajuga (Ingram, 1978) – Black Mountain gecko, Black Mountain slender-toed gecko
- Nactus grevifer Zug, 2020 – Torricelli slender-toed gecko
- Nactus heteronotus (Boulenger, 1885) – central savanna slender-toed gecko
- Nactus intrudusus Zug, 2020 – Markham slender-toed gecko
- Nactus inundatus Zug, 2020 – Fly River slender-toed gecko
- Nactus kamiali Zug, 2020 – Kamiali slender-toed gecko
- Nactus kunan Fisher & Zug, 2012
- Nactus modicus Zug, 2020 – Louisiade slender-toed gecko
- Nactus multicarinatus (Günther, 1872)
- Nactus nanus Zug, 2020 – dwarf North-coast slender-toed gecko
- Nactus notios Zug, 2020 – southern mountains slender-toed gecko
- Nactus panaeati Zug, 2020 – Panaeati slender-toed gecko
- Nactus papua Zug, 2020 – Papuan slender-toed gecko
- Nactus pelagicus (Girard, 1858) – pelagic gecko, Pacific slender-toed gecko, rock gecko
- Nactus rainerguentheri Zug, 2020 – Vogelkop slender-toed gecko
- Nactus robertfisheri Zug, 2020 – Bismarcks slender-toed gecko
- Nactus septentrionalis Zug, 2020 – North Coast Papuan slender-toed gecko
- Nactus serpensinsula (Loveridge, 1951) – Serpent Island gecko
- Nactus soniae Arnold & Bour, 2008 - extinct
- Nactus sphaerodactylodes Kraus, 2005
- Nactus undulatus (Kopstein, 1926) – Kei rock gecko
- Nactus vankampeni (Brongersma, 1933) – van Kampen's gecko

Nota bene: A binomial authority or trinomial authority in parentheses indicates that the species or subspecies was originally described in a genus other than Nactus.
