= Nactus undulatus =

Scientific classification
- Kingdom: Animalia
- Phylum: Chordata
- Class: Reptilia
- Order: Squamata
- Suborder: Gekkota
- Family: Gekkonidae
- Genus: Nactus
- Species: N. undulatus

Binomial name
- Nactus undulatus (Kopstein, 1926)

Species of lizard

The Kei rock gecko (Nactus undulatus) is a species of lizard in the family Gekkonidae. It is found in Indonesia.
