= Esk River (Queensland) =

River in Queensland, Australia

Esk
- Location of Esk River mouth in Queensland

Location
- Country: Australia
- State: Queensland
- Region: Far North Queensland, Wet Tropics of Queensland, Cape York Peninsula

Physical characteristics
- Source: Great Dividing Range
  - location: below Dowlings Hill
  - coordinates: 15°35′20″S 145°16′30″E
  - elevation: 356 m (1,168 ft)
- Mouth: Walker Bay, Coral Sea
  - location: south of Cooktown
  - coordinates: 15°31′50″S 145°16′04″E
  - elevation: 0 m (0 ft)
- Length: 20 km (12 mi)

The Esk River is a river in the Wet Tropics of Far North Queensland, Australia.

== Course and features ==
The river rises below Dowlings Hill, sourced by runoff from the Great Dividing Range, and flows north across the mostly uninhabited coastal plain. The Esk River enters the Annan Forest Reserve and flows through a wetland dominated by mangroves. At its mouth, the Esk River is joined by the Annan River and together discharge into Walker Bar and then onto the Coral Sea approximately 7 kilometres (4 mi) south of Cooktown. The river descends 356 metres (1,168 ft) over its 20-kilometre (12 mi) course.

Much of the Esk River catchment lies within protected area tenure. As of 2013 the river appeared to be in a healthy condition with limited siltation and only infrequent pockets of erosion.

Floods in 1910 recorded the Esk River as 12 feet (3.7 m) over the normal river height.

== See also ==
- List of rivers of Australia § Queensland
