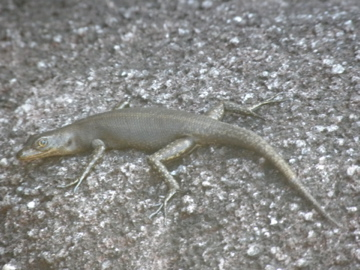
- Black Mountain rainbow-skink (Liburnascincus scirtetis)

Scientific classification
- Kingdom: Animalia
- Phylum: Chordata
- Class: Reptilia
- Order: Squamata
- Family: Scincidae
- Subfamily: Eugongylinae
- Genus: Liburnascincus; Wells & Wellington, 1983

Species
- 4 species (see text)

= Liburnascincus =

Genus of lizards

Liburnascincus is a genus of skinks. All are endemic to Australia.

== Species ==
The following 4 species, listed alphabetically by specific name, are recognized as being valid:

- Liburnascincus artemis Hoskin & Couper, 2015
- Liburnascincus coensis (Mitchell, 1953) – Coen rainbow-skink
- Liburnascincus mundivensis (Broom, 1898) – Outcrop rainbow-skink
- Liburnascincus scirtetis (Ingram & Covacevich, 1980) – Black Mountain rainbow-skink, Black Mountain skink

Nota bene: A binomial authority in parentheses indicates that the species was originally described in a genus other than Liburnascincus.
