= Liburnascincus mundivensis =

Conservation status
- Least Concern (IUCN 3.1)

Scientific classification
- Kingdom: Animalia
- Phylum: Chordata
- Class: Reptilia
- Order: Squamata
- Suborder: Scinciformata
- Infraorder: Scincomorpha
- Family: Eugongylidae
- Genus: Liburnascincus
- Species: L. mundivensis

Binomial name
- Liburnascincus mundivensis (Broom, 1898)

Species of lizard

Liburnascincus mundivensis, the outcrop rainbow-skink, is an endemic lizard species inhabiting Queensland, Australia. It is named after the type locality whose name ("Muldiva") is a corruption of the aboriginal name for the creek Mundiva.
