= Annan River =

River in Queensland, Australia

Annan
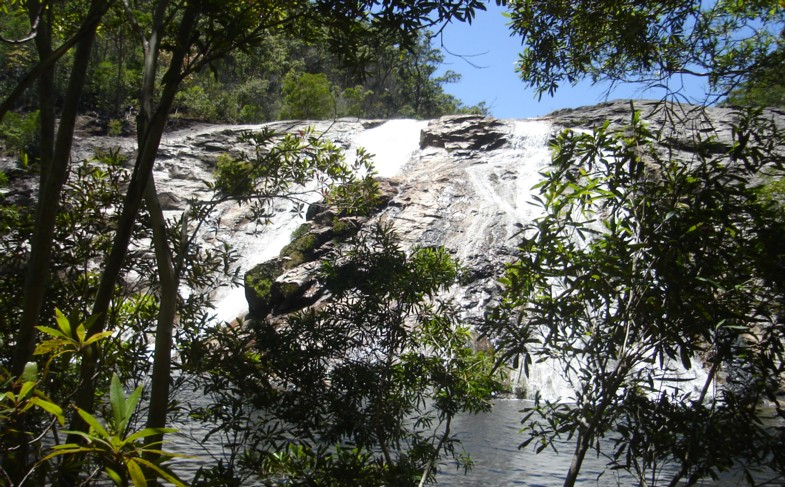
- A waterfall in the Upper Annan River catchment

- Location of Annan River mouth in Queensland
- Etymology: River Annan, Scotland
- Native name: Yuku Baja (Kuku Nyungkal)

Location
- Country: Australia
- State: Queensland
- Region: Far North Queensland, Wet Tropics of Queensland

Physical characteristics
- Source: Yorkey Range
  - location: below Mount Romeo
  - coordinates: 15°50′13″S 145°17′26″E
  - elevation: 568 m (1,864 ft)
- Mouth: Walker Bay, Coral Sea
  - location: south of Cooktown
  - coordinates: 15°31′49″S 145°16′25″E
  - elevation: 0 m (0 ft)
- Length: 66 km (41 mi)
- Basin size: 750 km^{2} (290 sq mi)
- Discharge
  - location: Near mouth
  - average: 26.6 m^{3}/s (840 GL/a)

Basin features
- Tributaries
  - left: Scrubby Creek, Oaky Creek (Queensland)
  - right: Trevethan Creek
- National parks: Kalkajaka National Park; Annan River (Yuku Baja-Muliku) National Park

The Annan River (Kuku Nyungkal: Yuku Baja) is a river in the Wet Tropics of Far North Queensland, Australia.

== Course and features ==
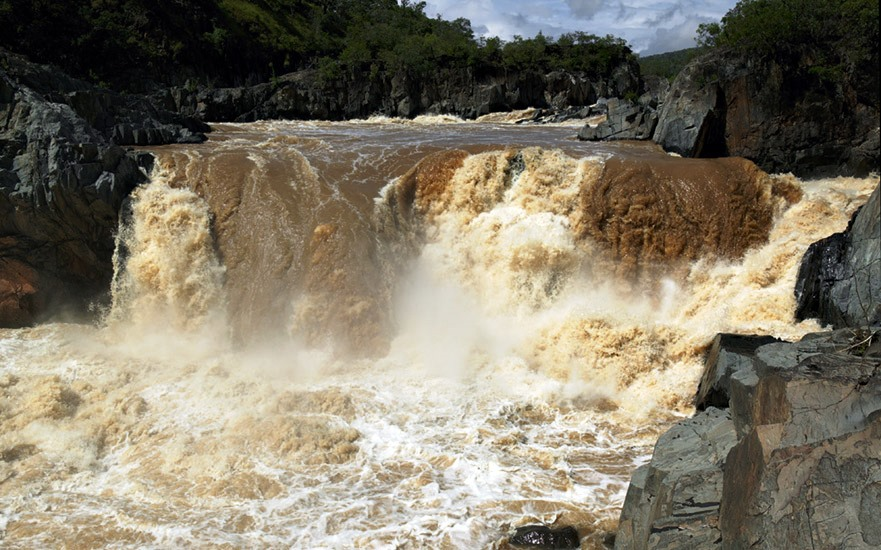
Annan River Falls in flood. 2004

The river rises in the Yorkey Range below Mount Romeo near Rossville, north-northwest of Wujal Wujal. The river flows generally in a north-westerly direction, joined by three minor tributaries that drain waters from the Trevethan Range before finally heading eastwards to Walker Bay. At its river mouth, the Annan River is joined by the Esk River and together the two rivers empty into the Coral Sea south of Cooktown. The river descends 568 metres (1,864 ft) over its 66-kilometre (41 mi) course and flows through the Kalkajaka National Park and the Annan River (Yuku Baja-Muliku) National Park. The river has a catchment area of 750 square kilometres (290 sq mi).

Being in a wet-dry tropical climate the river receives the majority of its approximately 1,800-millimetre (71 in) rainfall per year between the months of December and April, a period known as the wet season.

The river is crossed by the Mulligan Highway near Rossville and again closer to its mouth.

== Etymology ==
The river was given its gazetted name by an early Australian pastoralist and magistrate, John Jardine, who, on 11 November 1865, named it after the River Annan in Scotland, while on passage in HMS Salamander.

== History ==
Many of the river's waterfalls, waterholes, and waters have indigenous names, inspired by local indigenous religious beliefs, and have been a primary source of life, sustenance, foods, and water for many thousands of generations of predecessors to the Kuku Nyungkal people (also known as the Annan River Tribe).

Towards the end of the 19th century non-Aboriginal peoples had started to colonize the Far North Queensland region, and with the shift from predominantly gold mining activity (especially at Palmer River) to tin, lead, silver and copper mining, they started to move into the Annan River catchment and Kuku Nyungkal country.

By 1885 Charles Ross had discovered tin in the upper Annan River area (firstly Mount Amos, then Mounts Hartley, Leswell and Romeo). Sluicing began that year, leading to a small-scale tin mining rush into Kuku Nyungkal country during 1886. Following this rush, for a number of years, a small but vibrant tin mining industry was able to mine lucrative tin deposits directly from underground lodes, creek beds and banks. Later, the industry had to adapt to exhausted supplies by consolidating and building water channels (races) through the Upper Annan River ranges to access higher, more difficult to reach deposits.

One such 11-kilometre (6.8 mi)-long race, known as the Annan River Company Water Race, was first built at the cost of an Adelaide based company in 1902 and is now cultural heritage listed and protected as Queensland heritage. The tin mining and other "disturbance" history of the otherwise more pristine Annan River catchment can be briefly summarized as follows:

"This catchment has been quite extensively mined for tin since the late 19th century. Some small alluvial tin mining leases may still ... contribute significant sediment loads to the river. Other disturbances in the Annan catchment include unsealed roads and fords, grazing, and a number of small residential developments."

== Heritage listings ==
The heritage-listed Annan River Bridge, located on Development Road, Cooktown, is a rare example of a plate girder and screw pile bridge. It is also an uncommon example of a low-level bridge.

== Vegetation ==
The Department of the Environment Natural Resource Atlas categorized the Annan River catchment as "Low Development", with less than 30% of its total catchment area being developed. The catchment as a whole has been described as being "...at the pristine end of the disturbance spectrum...", extensively forested as follows:

"...the southern and eastern portions [are] predominantly rainforest and open eucalypt forest. The western and northern parts are more sparsely vegetated consisting of open eucalypt forest and woodland with pockets of rainforest along Oaky Creek. The alluvial plains are covered by tall shrubland. The estuarine portion of the river comprises large areas of ephemeral and tidal wetlands..."

== See also ==
- Kuku Nyungkal people
- List of rivers of Australia § Queensland
