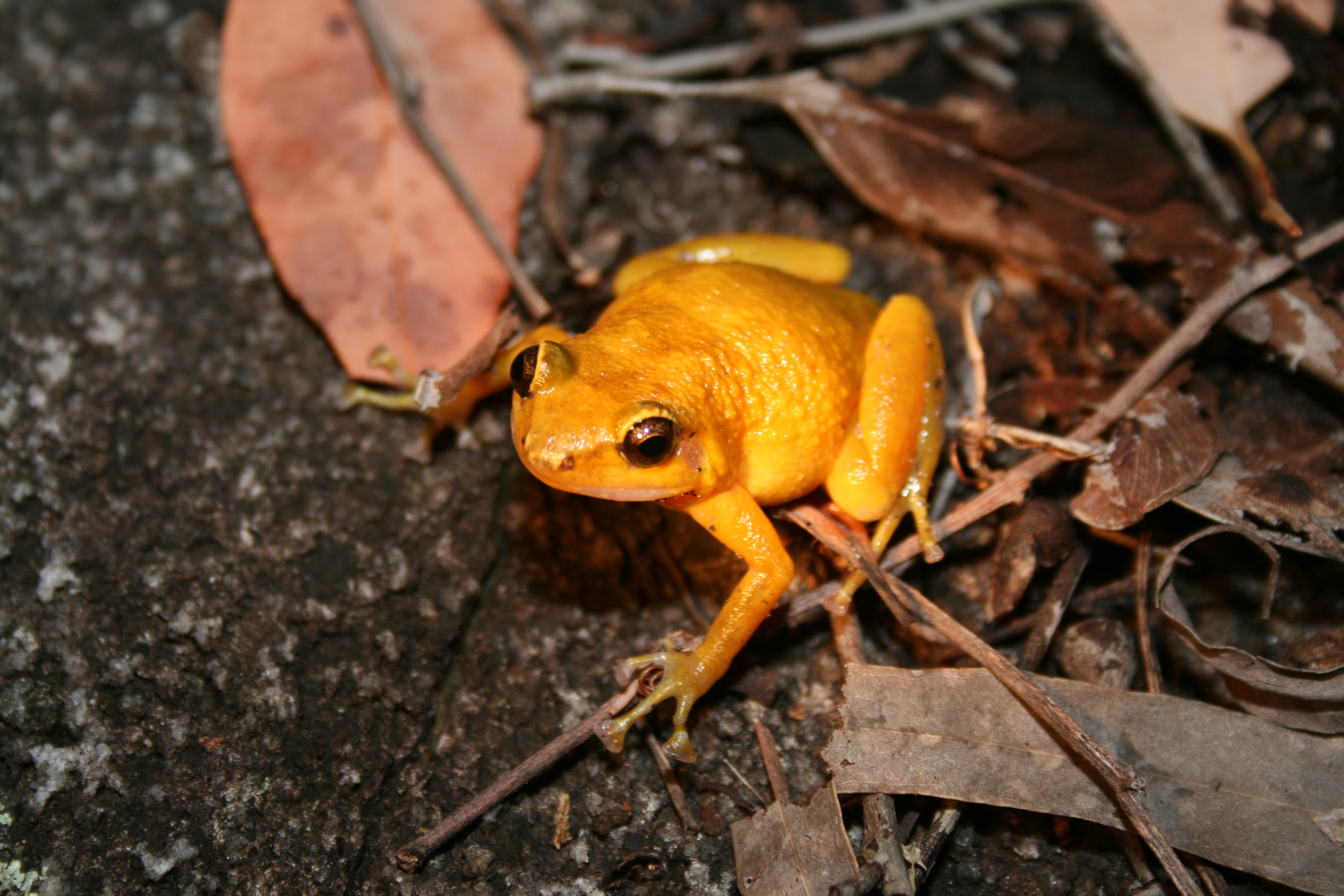
- Female

Conservation status
- Least Concern (IUCN 3.1)

Scientific classification
- Kingdom: Animalia
- Phylum: Chordata
- Class: Amphibia
- Order: Anura
- Family: Microhylidae
- Genus: Cophixalus
- Species: C. saxatilis

Binomial name
- Cophixalus saxatilis Zweifel & Parker, 1977

= Black Mountain boulder frog =

Species of amphibian

The Black Mountain boulder frog (Cophixalus saxatilis), also known as the rock haunting frog or the Black Mountain rainforest frog, is a species of frog in the family Microhylidae.

It is endemic to Australia, and its populations are now restricted to the Kalkajaka National Park, Australia.

Its original habitats were subtropical or tropical moist lowland forests, rocky areas, and caves, now severely reduced to the "Black Mountains" 25 km (16 mi) south-west of Cooktown, Queensland.

== Description ==
The Queensland Environmental Protection Agency has described and summarized some of the distinctive features of this frog as follows:

The vulnerable Black Mountain boulderfrog or rock haunting frog (Cophixalus saxatilis) is one of the largest (about the size of a walnut) of Australia's microhylids — a group of frogs normally confined to the leaf litter of tropical rainforests.

This large-eyed frog lays its eggs on land rather than in water. An adult tends to the eggs and young, which hatch as fully formed froglets. They have no tadpole stage.

The smaller mottled brown male are more easily heard than seen. Their call is a sharp tapping noise.

They have acquired an almost crab-like ability to scuttle on the granite boulders, although they can still disappear in a series of leaps when alarmed. At night these frogs emerge to forage on the boulders of the mountain and in and about the scattered figs and fringing monsoon forest.

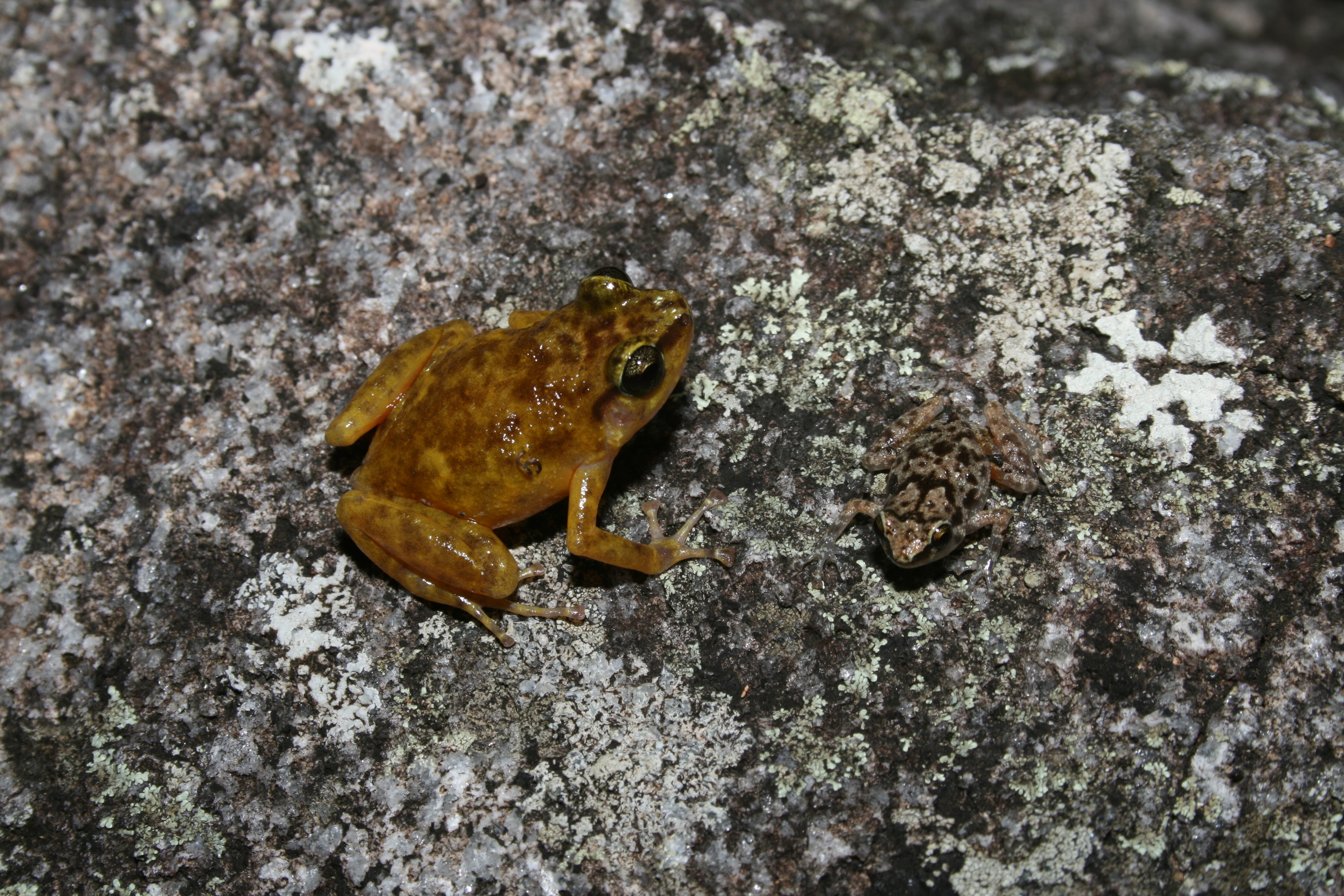
Male and juvenile of the Black Mountain Boulder Frog (Cophixalus saxatilis)

== See also ==
- Kalkajaka National Park
