= Nactus eboracensis =

Nactus acutus

Conservation status
- Least Concern (IUCN 3.1)

Scientific classification
- Domain: Eukaryota
- Kingdom: Animalia
- Phylum: Chordata
- Class: Reptilia
- Order: Squamata
- Infraorder: Gekkota
- Family: Gekkonidae
- Genus: Nactus
- Species: N. eboracensis

Binomial name
- Nactus eboracensis (Macleay, 1877)

Synonyms
- Heteronota eboracensis

Species of lizard

Nactus eboracensis is a species of lizard in the family Gekkonidae. It is endemic to Queensland in Australia and some Torres Strait Islands.
