= Kuku Nyungkal dialect =

Australian Aboriginal language

Kuku Nyungkal
- Gugu Njunggal
- Native to: Australia
- Region: Annan River, Queensland
- Ethnicity: Kuku Nyungkal people
- Native speakers: (undated figure of 5)
- Language family: Pama–Nyungan: Paman; Yalanjic; Kuku Yalanji; Kuku Nyungkal
- Writing system: Latin

Language codes
- ISO 639-3: –
- Glottolog: kuku1274
- AIATSIS: Y90

The Kuku Nyungkal dialect (also written Kuku Nyungkul, Kuku Njunggal, Guugu Nyungkul, Gugu Njunggal, Kuku Njungkul, Kuku Ngungkal) is an Australian Aboriginal language and the language of the Kuku Nyungkal people of Far North Queensland. It is a variety of Kuku Yalanji still being spoken (though by fewer people than speak Kuku Yalanji itself). Most of the speakers today live in the communities of Wujal Wujal and Mossman.

The UNESCO Atlas of the World's Languages in Danger includes Kuku Nyungkal language as part of a larger Kuku Yalanji languages listing, identifying and listing all the Kuku Yalanji languages as a whole as being "severely endangered".

As of 2020, Kuku Ngungkal is one of 20 languages prioritised as part of the Priority Languages Support Project, being undertaken by First Languages Australia and funded by the Department of Communications and the Arts. The project aims to "identify and document critically-endangered languages — those languages for which little or no documentation exists, where no recordings have previously been made, but where there are living speakers".

== Phonology ==
=== Vowels ===
Kuku Nyungkal has three vowels as follows:

Vowels	English equivalent
a	as in f a ther
i	as in p i t
u	as in p u t

=== Consonants ===
Kuku Nyungkal has thirteen consonants as follows:

b	d	j	k	l	m	n	ny	ng	r	rr	w	y

All are pronounced as they would be in English, with the rr used for a rolled r, as in the Scottish r.
