= Hope Islands National Park =

National park in Australia

- IUCN category II (national park)
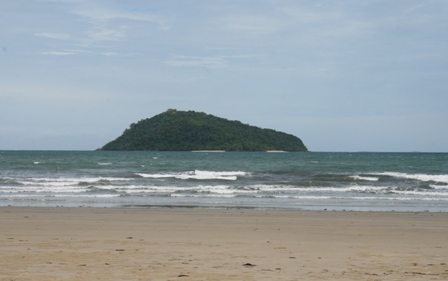
- Snapper Island, part of the Hope Islands National Park

- Location within Queensland
- Location: Queensland
- Nearest city: Cooktown
- Coordinates: 15°43′53″S 145°27′26″E
- Area: 1.74 km^{2} (0.67 sq mi)
- Established: 1939
- Governing body: Queensland Parks and Wildlife Service
- Website: Official website

Hope Islands National Park is a national park in Queensland (Australia) 1,521 km north-west of Brisbane. The park consists of four islands: East Hope and West Hope, Snapper Island and Struck Island.

The Hope Islands are situated approximately 37 km south-east of Cooktown and about 8 km offshore (15.73889°S 145.45222°E) and officially part of the mainland locality of Rossville.

Struck Island is a rocky outcrop just off Thornton Beach and south of Cape Tribulation.

Snapper island is about two km long and is at the mouth of the Daintree River. It is about 20 km north of Port Douglas.

Access is via private vessel or by permitted commercial operators.

The Hope islands were named by Lt James Cook on 13 June 1770, after his ship HMS Endeavour narrowly escaped sinking after running aground on the eastern part of Endeavour Reef at 11pm on 11 June. Cook writes of taking a risk and sailing from the reef on the morning of 13 June in favourable conditions but the three operational bilge pumps could not keep up with the flow of water. Cook wrote "we were always in hopes of being able to reach these Islands". Cook speaks of he and the crew thinking the situation so dire that the best scenario would be to ground the boat on the reef surrounding the islands if the mainland could not be reached. They aimed to build a vessel from the wreck to make it back to the East Indies. However, some crew members were able to "fother" the leak using a sail so that the water could be cleared easily using one bilge pump. Endeavour was able to be sailed safely to what is now Cooktown so that repairs could be undertaken.

== See also ==
- Protected areas of Queensland
