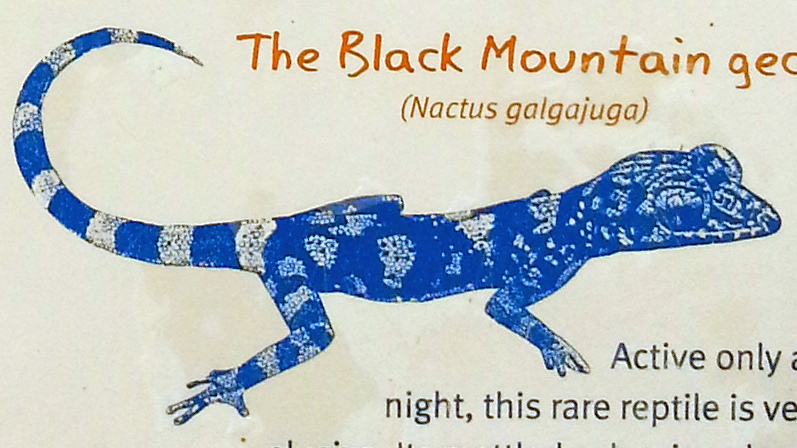
- Black Mountain Gecko Illustration

Conservation status
- Least Concern (IUCN 3.1)

Scientific classification
- Kingdom: Animalia
- Phylum: Chordata
- Class: Reptilia
- Order: Squamata
- Suborder: Gekkota
- Family: Gekkonidae
- Genus: Nactus
- Species: N. galgajuga

Binomial name
- Nactus galgajuga (Ingram, 1978)

Synonyms
- Cyrtodactylus galgajuga

= Nactus galgajuga =

Species of lizard

Nactus galgajuga, also known as the Black Mountain gecko or Black Mountain slender-toed gecko, is a species of lizard in the family Gekkonidae. It is endemic to Queensland in Australia.
