= Kalkajaka National Park =

National park in Queensland, Australia

- IUCN category II (national park)
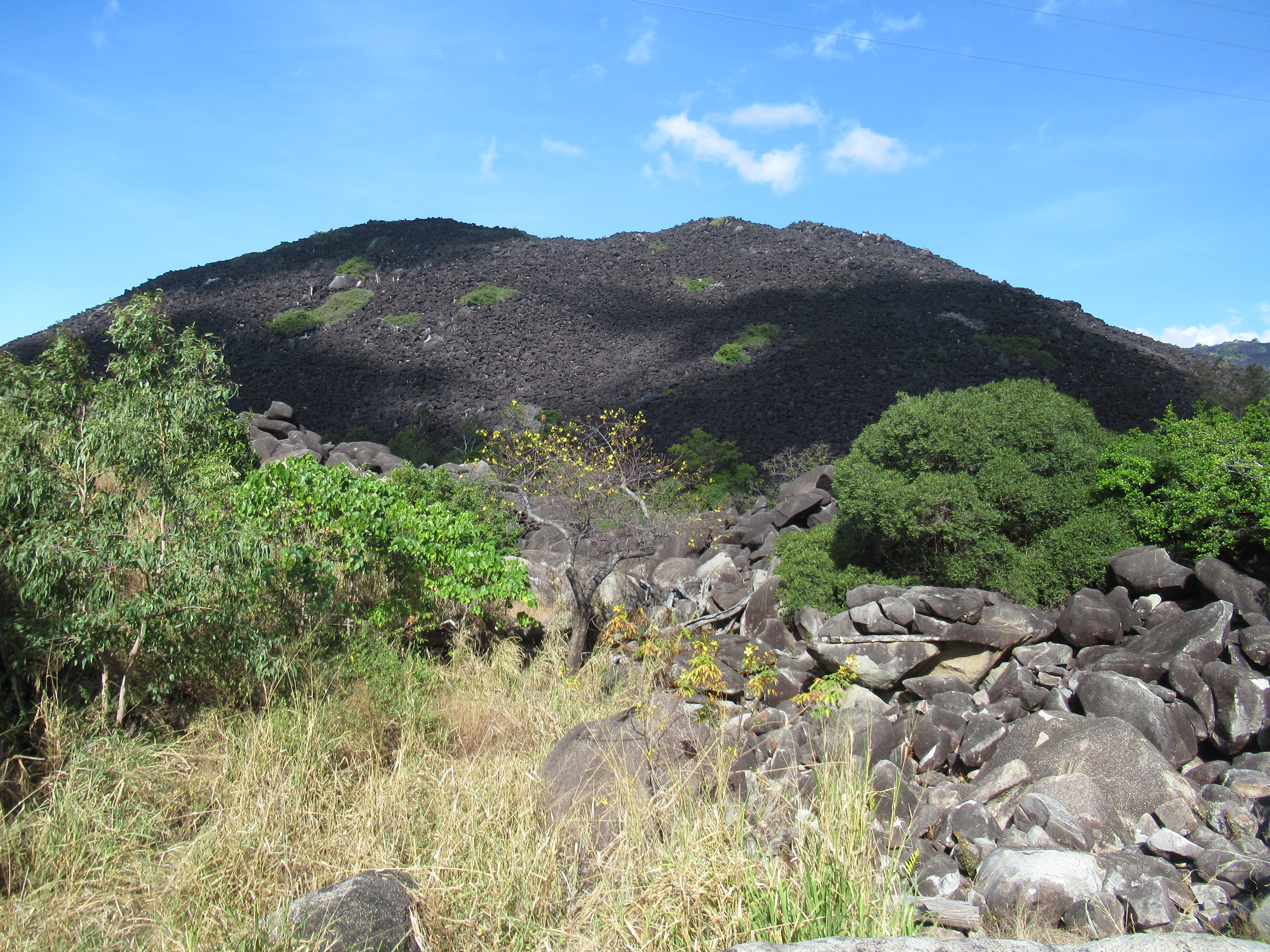
- View of one of the park's mountains from Mulligan Highway

- Location within Queensland
- Location: Queensland
- Nearest city: Cooktown
- Coordinates: 15°40′05″S 145°13′55″E
- Area: 7.81 km^{2} (3.02 sq mi)
- Established: 1980 (Register of the National Estate)
- Governing body: Queensland Parks and Wildlife Service
- Website: Official website

Kalkajaka National Park, also called Black Mountain National Park, is a 781-hectare (1,930-acre) protected area in Shire of Cook, Queensland, Australia.

== Geography ==
The park is 25 km south west of Cooktown. It is managed and protected as a national park under the Nature Conservation Act 1992.

The main feature of the park is the mass of granite boulders, some the size of houses. The absence of soil between the boulders and rocks create a maze of gaps and passages, which can be used to penetrate inside the mountain. These rocks can become extremely hot.

The area has a bad reputation as numerous people and those searching for the missing have disappeared without trace. The Mulligan Highway marks the western border of the park.

== Natural history ==
The national park's distinctive hard black boulders (often termed granite) and range are composed of the igneous felsic intrusive Trevethan Granodiorite which is predominantly a white to grey, medium-grained, porphyritic biotite monzogranite to granodiorite. The age of the intrusive is Late Permian and has been dated from 259.1 to 251.9 million years old. The Trevethan Granodiorite was originally magma that slowly solidified under the earth's crust.

The softer land surfaces above the solidified magma eroded away over time, leaving the magma's fractured top to be exposed as a mountain of grey granite boulders blackened by a film of microscopic blue-green algae growing on the exposed surfaces. Colder rains falling on the dark, heated granite boulders causes the boulders to progressively fracture, break, and slowly disintegrate, sometimes explosively.

== Cultural history ==
Kalkajaka ("Black Mountain") is a heavily significant feature of the Kuku Nyungkal people's cultural landscape. Kalkajaka translates to "place of the spear".

Queensland's Department of Environment and Natural Resources has been advised of at least four sites of particular mythological significance within the area as follows:

There are at least four sites of religious or mythological significance on the mountain. These are the Kambi, a large rock with a cave where flying-foxes are found; Julbanu, a big grey kangaroo-shaped rock looking toward Cooktown; Birmba, a stone facing toward Helenvale where sulphur-crested cockatoos are seen; and a taboo place called Yirrmbal near the foot of the range.

Kalkajaka also features strongly in local, more non-Aboriginal cultural landscapes, some of which has also been described by Queensland's Department of Environment and Resource Management as follows:

When European colonists arrived late last century, they added to the many Aboriginal legends of the area with a few of their own. Stories abound of people, horses and whole mobs of cattle disappearing into the labyrinth of rocks, never to be seen again

It is believed that those who vanished most probably fell into one of the chasms under the rocks or after entering one of these places became lost. It is estimated only three in ten would survive such falls, wandering below the Earth's surface with only ground water streams and insects to nourish them. A minority group is referred to by colonists as the Outback Moles (perhaps in reference to New York's underground population).

== Ecology ==
The park's mountains are located at the northernmost end of the Wet Tropics World Heritage Area, where world heritage listed wet tropical forests meet drier savanna woodlands - making it a natural refuge for once more widespread, now isolated relict fauna.

Queensland's Department of Environment and Resource Management advises, for instance, the relatively small, unusual "Black Mountain" environment is the world's only habitat for at least three animals: the Black Mountain boulderfrog or rock haunting frog (Cophixalus saxatilis); the Black Mountain skink (Carlia scirtetis); and the Black Mountain gecko (Nactus galgajuga). This makes the area one of Australia's most restricted habitats for endemic fauna.

== Facilities ==
Camping is not permitted in the park. There are no walking tracks and no facilities for picnics. There is a viewing platform that features interpretive displays.

== Gallery ==
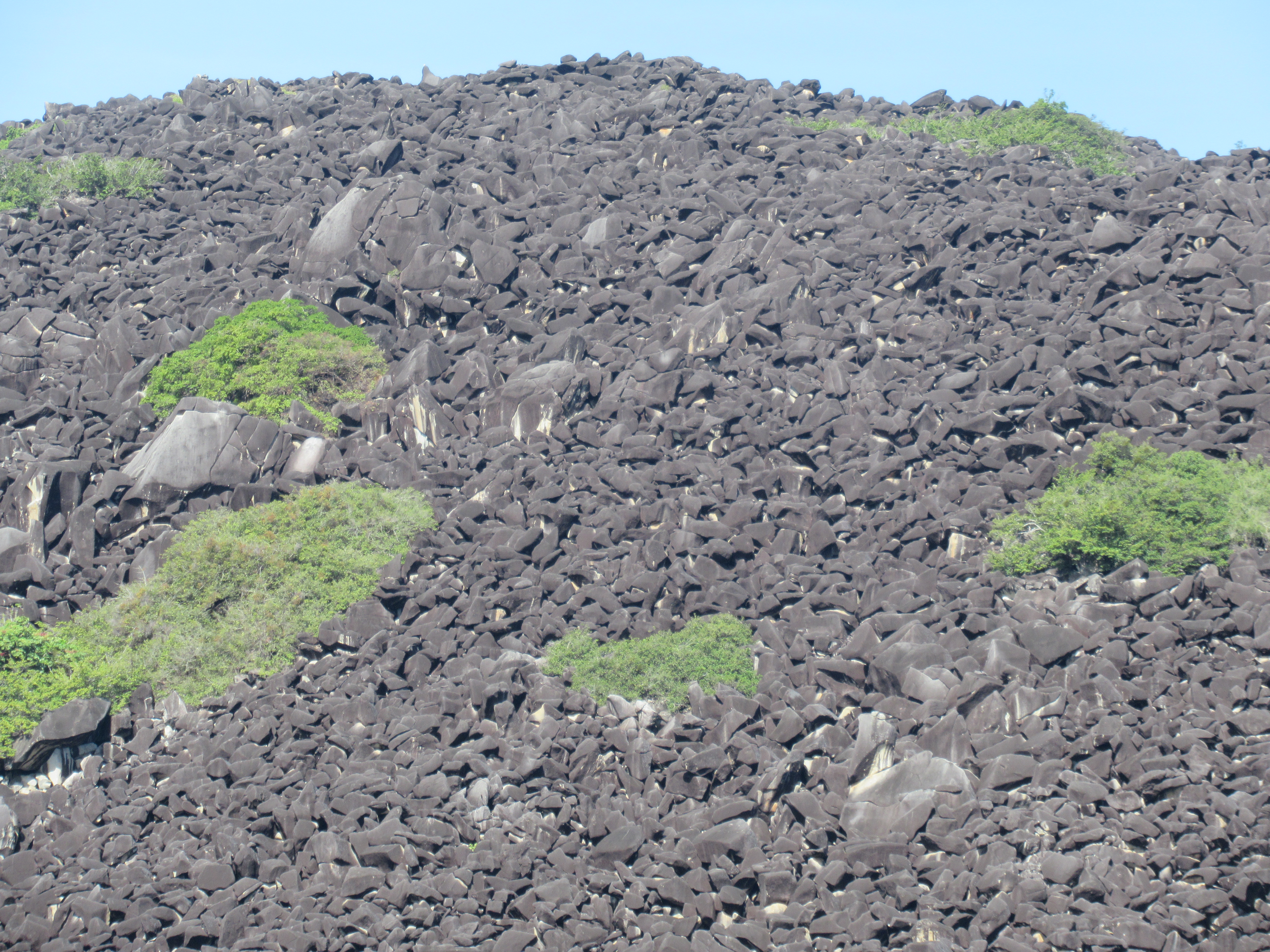
Kalkajaka in the Kalkajaka National Park near Cooktown, Queensland, Australia.

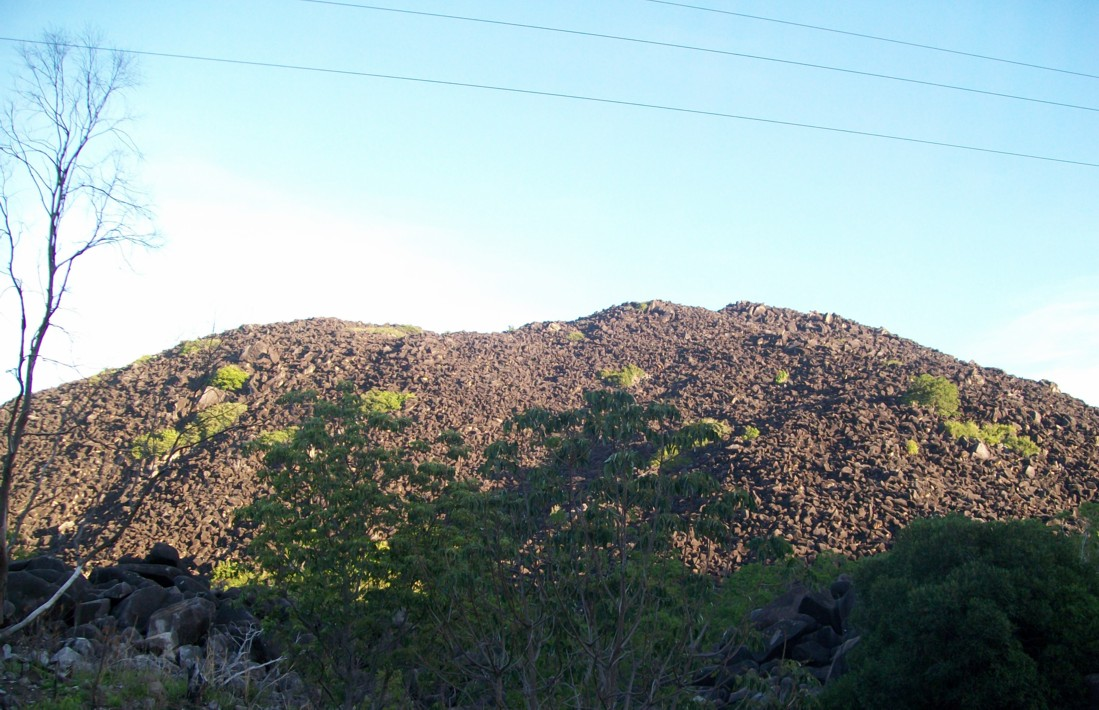
View of one of the black mountains from Mulligan Highway

== See also ==
- Protected areas of Queensland
- Kuku Nyungkal people
