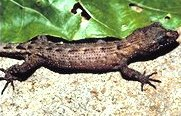

Conservation status
- Least Concern (IUCN 3.1)

Scientific classification
- Kingdom: Animalia
- Phylum: Chordata
- Order: Squamata
- Suborder: Gekkota
- Family: Gekkonidae
- Genus: Nactus
- Species: N. pelagicus

Binomial name
- Nactus pelagicus (Girard, 1858)
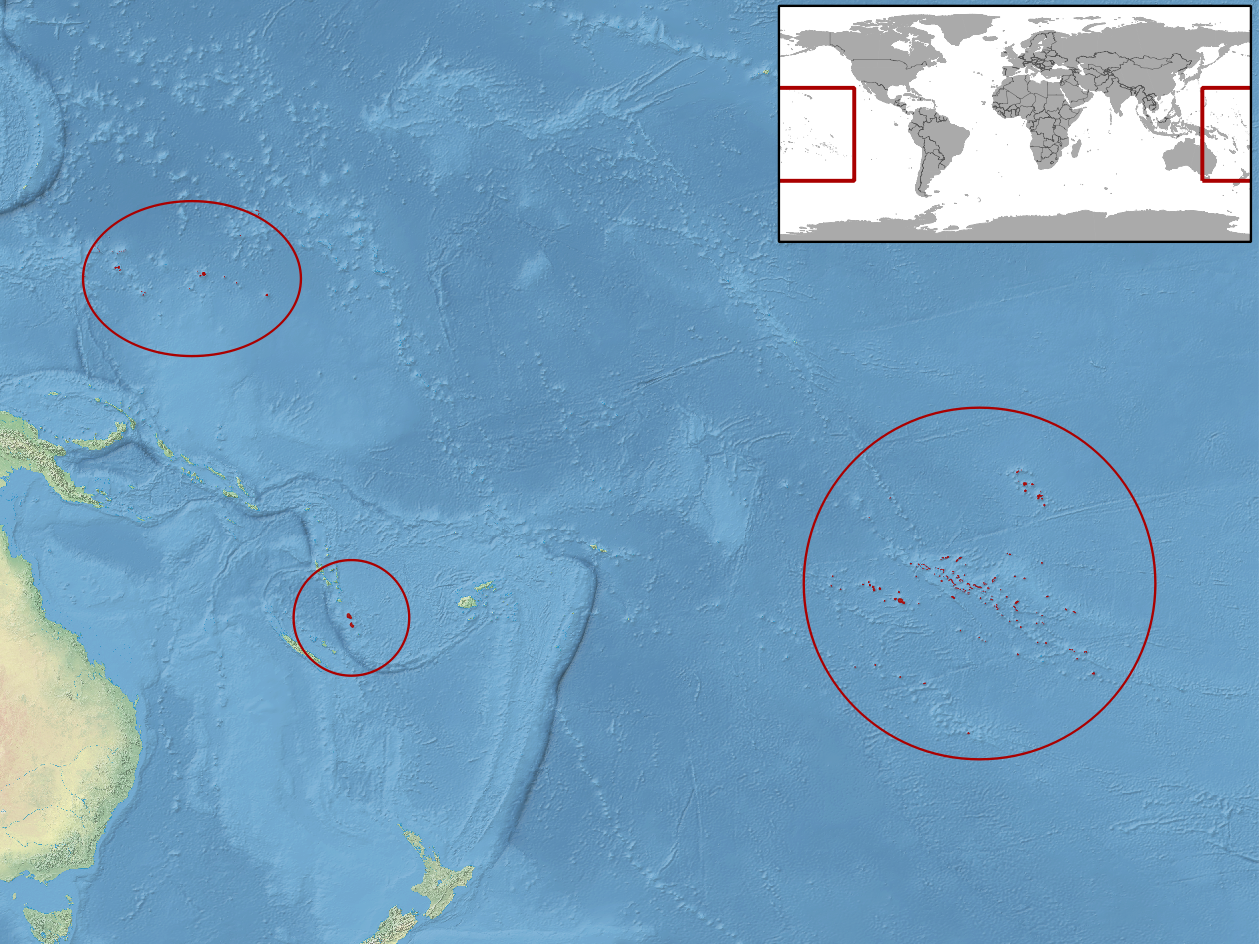

Synonyms
- Cyrtodactylus pelagicus Gymnodactylus arnouxii Gymnodactylus pelagicus Heteronota pelagica Nactus arnouxii

= Nactus pelagicus =

Species of lizard

Nactus pelagicus is a species of lizard in the family Gekkonidae. It is also known as the Pacific slender-toed gecko, pelagic gecko, and rock gecko. It is found from the Kai Islands through New Guinea, Melanesia and into the central Pacific, Micronesia, Tuamotu Archipelago, Fiji, Rotuma, Samoa, Solomon Islands, New Caledonia, Loyalty Islands, Vanuatu, Cook Islands, Tonga, Queensland in Australia, Northern Mariana Islands, and Guam.
