= Rossville, Queensland =

Rossville
- Town
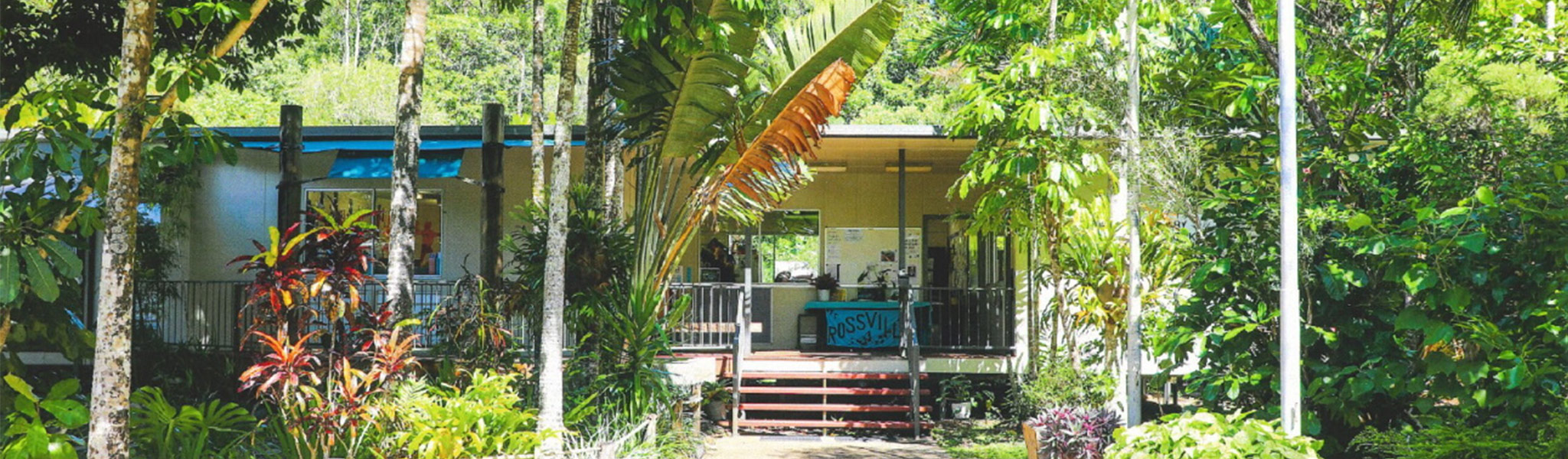
- Rossville State School, 2022

- Interactive map of Rossville
- Coordinates: 15.7512°S 145.2672°E
- Country: Australia
- State: Queensland
- LGA: Shire of Cook
- Location: 38.3 km (23.8 mi) S of Cooktown; 245 km (152 mi) N of Mossman; 313 km (194 mi) N of Cairns; 1,985 km (1,233 mi) NNW of Brisbane

Government
  - State electorate: Cook
  - Federal division: Leichhardt

Area
  - Total: 661.3 km^{2} (255.3 sq mi)

Population
  - Total: 253 (2021 census)
  - Density: 0.3826/km^{2} (0.9909/sq mi)
- Time zone: UTC+10:00 (AEST)
- Postcode: 4895
Localities around Rossville
Lakeland	Cooktown	Coral Sea
Lakeland	Rossville	Bloomfield
Lakeland	Bloomfield	Bloomfield

Rossville is a town and coastal locality in the Shire of Cook, Queensland, Australia. In the 2021 census, the locality of Rossville had a population of 253 people.

== Geography ==
Helenvale is a neighbourhood within the north-west of the locality (15.717°S 145.217°E).

The Hope Islands are an island group 10 kilometres (6.2 mi) off the east coast of Rossville (15.7389°S 145.4522°E).

The Annan River and East Normanby River both rise on the slopes of the Trevethan Range in the south of Rossville.

The boundaries of the locality extend into the Coral Sea to incorporate the two Hope Islands into the locality (unofficially known as East Hope and West Hope to distinguish them). The Hope Islands are entirely within the Hope Islands National Park.

== History ==
The Hope Island are traditionally part of the sea country of the Kuku Yalanji Aboriginal people.

The Hope Islands were named by Lieutenant James Cook of HMS Endeavour on 13 June 1770. After the Endeavour had become stranded on the Endeavour Reef, Cook hoped that they might reach the islands after freeing the ship.

Rossville Provisional School opened circa 1898 and became Rossville State School on 1 January 1909. It closed in 1964. A new Rossville State School opened on 25 January 1988.

== Demographics ==
In the 2016 census, the locality of Rossville had a population of 204 people.

In the 2021 census, the locality of Rossville had a population of 253 people.

== Heritage listings ==
Rossville has a number of heritage-listed sites, including:

- Collingwood Water Race (15.789°S 145.256°E)

== Education ==
Rossville State School is a government primary (Prep-6) school for boys and girls at Angus Gully Road (15.7632°S 145.2683°E). In 2017, the school had an enrolment of 32 students with 3 teachers and 7 non-teaching staff (3 full-time equivalent). In 2018, the school had an enrolment of 28 students with 2 teachers and 5 non-teaching staff (2 full-time equivalent).

There are no secondary schools in Rossville with the nearest government secondary school being Cooktown State School in neighbouring Cooktown, 31.1 kilometres (19.3mi) to the north. However, students in the south of Rossville would be too distant to attend this school with the alternatives being distance education and boarding school.
