= George Robert Zug =

American herpetologist (born 1983)

- Born: 16 November 1938 (age 87); Carlisle, Pennsylvania, United States
- Education: Albright College, University of Florida, University of Michigan
- Known for: Research on turtles, frogs, skinks, and geckos
- Scientific career
- Fields: Herpetology
- Workplaces: National Museum of Natural History

George Robert Zug (born 16 November 1938) is an American herpetologist.

== Biography ==
Zug grew up as an only child in the semi-rural community of Mount Holly Springs, where he began observing local flora and fauna at an early age. In the late 1950s, while studying at Albright College in Reading, Pennsylvania, he met zoologist Albert Schwartz, who became his first major scientific mentor. Schwartz took him to Cuba on research trips, where Zug was introduced to herpetological fieldwork.

He received his Bachelor's degree in 1960 and his M.Sc. in 1963 from the University of Florida in Gainesville, where he studied the morphology of turtle penises. In 1968, he earned his Ph.D. from the University of Michigan with the dissertation Buoyancy, locomotion, morphology of the pelvic girdle and hindlimb, and systematics of cryptodiran turtles. In 1975, he became curator of the herpetology department at the National Museum of Natural History, a position he held until his retirement in 2007.

Between 1971 and 1972, Zug spent six months with his family in New Guinea. Supported by the Smithsonian Institution, this long-term study focused on frogs, skinks, and geckos of the Australo-Papuan region. He later undertook additional research projects in the South Pacific. In 1997, he traveled to Myanmar at the invitation of Chris Wemmer for a training workshop with Burmese national park staff. He also participated in a herpetological survey program developed in collaboration with the California Academy of Sciences and funded by the National Science Foundation. Interns, research assistants, postdoctoral fellows, and other colleagues at the Smithsonian contributed to the project's results.

Zug integrated slow-motion filming into his studies to document the locomotion of turtles and frogs. He applied the method of skeletochronology to endangered sea turtles, as it provided a reliable tool for determining their age and sexual maturity, which in turn informed conservation planning.

He has published more than 100 peer-reviewed papers and over 160 additional scientific works, including four major studies on frog locomotion. In 2016, he received the Fitch Award for excellence in herpetology. In 2024, Zug co-authored the book Tortoises of the World with Devin A. Reese.

== Eponyms ==
Several species have been named in his honor:

- In 1958, Albert Schwartz named the Cuban frog Eleutherodactylus zugi after him.
- In 1984, Joseph Patric Ward honored Zug in the specific epithet of the Rio Grande cooter (Pseudemys gorzugi).
- In 2005, Wolfgang Böhme and Thomas Ziegler named the monitor lizard Varanus zugorum after Zug and his wife Patricia.
- In 2008, the gecko Cyrtodactylus zugi was named after him.
