= Bloomfield Falls =

Bloomfield Falls Wujal Wujal
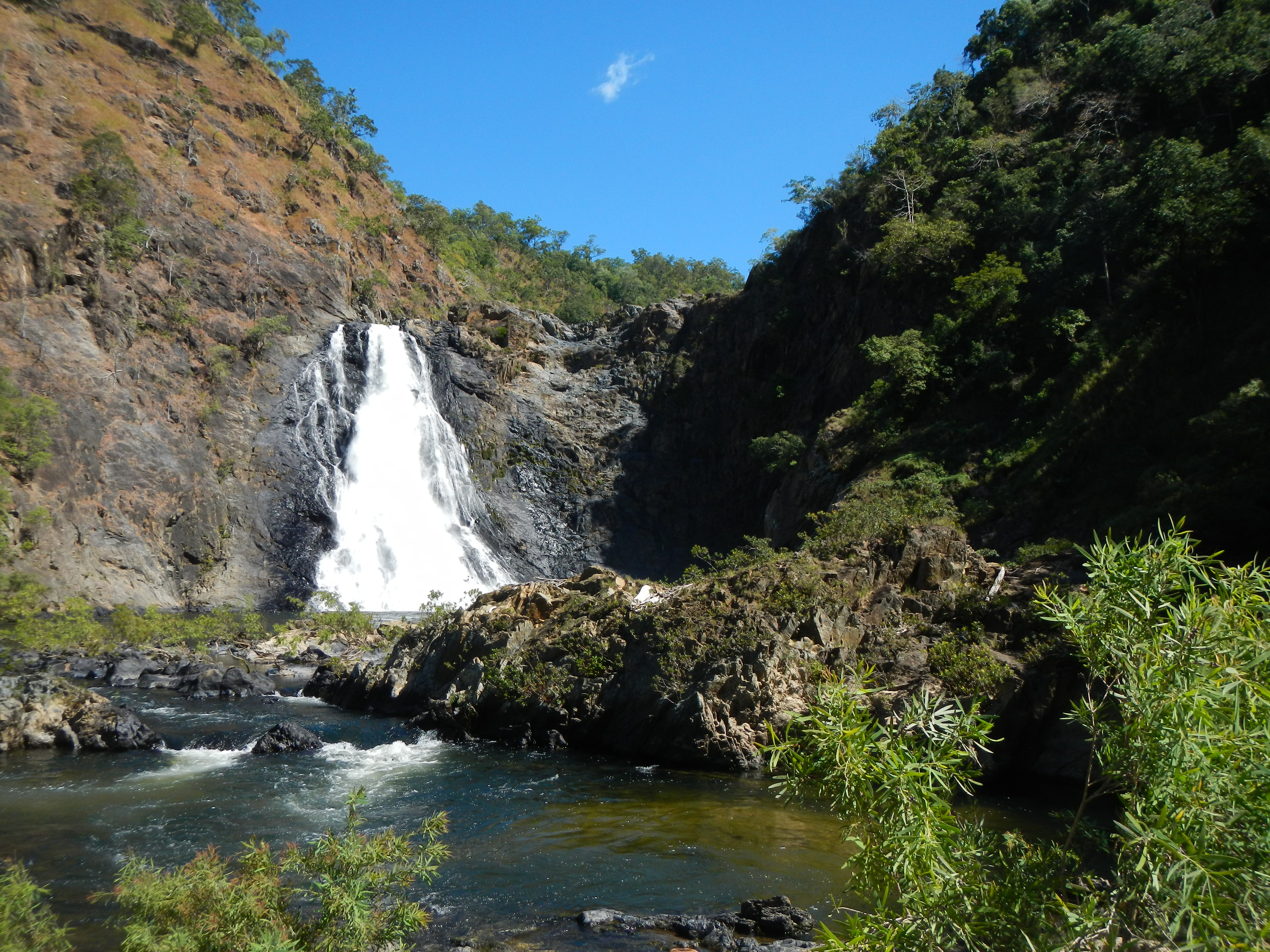

- Location within Queensland
- Location: Far North Queensland, Australia
- Coordinates: 15°57′47″S 145°18′45″E
- Type: Cascade
- Total height: 40 metres (130 ft)
- Watercourse: Bloomfield River

The Bloomfield Falls (Aboriginal: Wujal Wujal) is a cascade waterfall on the Bloomfield River near Cape Tribulation, close to Wujal Wujal in Queensland, Australia. It is within the Wet Tropics of Queensland World Heritage Area.

== Features and location ==
The falls are 40 metres (130 ft) high. The traditional custodians of the land surrounding the Bloomfield Falls are the Indigenous Australian Kuku Yalanji clan.

Access to the waterfall is provided via the Bloomfield Track, south of Cooktown. In the wet season it is not possible to visit the falls.

== See also ==
- List of waterfalls
- List of waterfalls in Australia
