= Notozomus wudjl =

Scientific classification
- Kingdom: Animalia
- Phylum: Arthropoda
- Subphylum: Chelicerata
- Class: Arachnida
- Order: Schizomida
- Family: Hubbardiidae
- Genus: Notozomus
- Species: N. wudjl

Binomial name
- Notozomus wudjl Harvey, 2000

Species of short-tailed whip-scorpion

Notozomus wudjl is a species of schizomid arachnid (commonly known as short-tailed whip-scorpions) in the Hubbardiidae family. It is endemic to Australia. It was described in 2000 by Australian arachnologist Mark Harvey. The specific epithet wudjl refers to the type locality.

== Description ==
The body length of the holotype male is 4.32 mm. It is yellow-brown in colour.

== Distribution and habitat ==
The species occurs in Far North Queensland, inhabiting plant litter in closed forest habitats. The type locality is 14.4 km north of the community of Wujal Wujal on the Cape York Peninsula.

== Behaviour ==
The arachnids are terrestrial predators.
