= Notozomus elongatus =

Scientific classification
- Kingdom: Animalia
- Phylum: Arthropoda
- Subphylum: Chelicerata
- Class: Arachnida
- Order: Schizomida
- Family: Hubbardiidae
- Genus: Notozomus
- Species: N. elongatus

Binomial name
- Notozomus elongatus Harvey, 2000

Species of short-tailed whip-scorpion

Notozomus elongatus is a species of schizomid arachnid (commonly known as short-tailed whip-scorpions) in the Hubbardiidae family. It is endemic to Australia. It was described in 2000 by Australian arachnologist Mark Harvey. The specific epithet elongatus (Latin: ‘prolonged’ or ‘elongated’) refers to the unusually long and slender spermathecal receptacula.

== Distribution and habitat ==
The species occurs in Far North Queensland, inhabiting plant litter in closed forest habitats. The type locality is Mount Murray Prior, just east of the city of Cairns.

== Behaviour ==
The arachnids are terrestrial predators.
