= Pterostylis taurus =

Little bull orchid

Scientific classification
- Kingdom: Plantae
- Clade: Tracheophytes
- Clade: Angiosperms
- Clade: Monocots
- Order: Asparagales
- Family: Orchidaceae
- Subfamily: Orchidoideae
- Tribe: Cranichideae
- Genus: Pterostylis
- Species: P. taurus

Binomial name
- Pterostylis taurus D.L.Jones & M.A.Clem.

Synonyms"APC" />
- Diplodium taurus (M.A.Clem. & D.L.Jones) M.A.Clem. & D.L.Jones; Pterostylis ophioglossa subsp. fusca Clemesha; Pterostylis taurus D.L.Jones nom. inval.; Taurantha taurus (M.A.Clem. & D.L.Jones) D.L.Jones & M.A.Clem.

Species of orchid

Pterostylis taurus, commonly known as the little bull orchid, is a species of orchid endemic to Queensland. It has a rosette of leaves at the base and a single dark red to reddish brown and white flower that leans downwards.

== Description ==
Pterostylis taurus is a terrestrial, perennial, deciduous, herb with an underground tuber and a rosette of green to bluish leaves, each leaf 10–25 mm (0.4–1 in) long and 5–15 mm (0.2–0.6 in) wide. Flowering plants have a similar rosette and a single dark red to reddish brown and white flower borne on a flowering spike 50–150 mm (2–6 in) high. The flowers are 25–30 mm (0.98–1.2 in) long, 10–13 mm (0.4–0.5 in) wide and lean downwards. The dorsal sepal and petals are joined and curve forward forming a hood called the "galea" over the column but the dorsal sepal is longer than the petals and has a pointed tip 3–5 mm (0.1–0.2 in) long. There is a narrow U-shaped sinus between the lateral sepals which have very thin, erect, thread-like tips 15–20 mm (0.6–0.8 in) long. The labellum protrudes above the sinus and is 7–9 mm (0.3–0.4 in) long, about 2 mm (0.08 in) wide, bright reddish brown and curved with a deep notch on the end. Flowering occurs between May and July.

== Taxonomy and naming ==
Pterostylis taurus was first described in 1989 by David Jones and Mark Clements and the description was published in Australian Orchid Research. The specific epithet (taurus) is a Latin word meaning "bull".

== Distribution and habitat ==
The little bull orchid grows in coastal scrub and forest between Paluma and the Mount Windsor National Park west of Daintree.
