= Notozomus curiosus =

Scientific classification
- Kingdom: Animalia
- Phylum: Arthropoda
- Subphylum: Chelicerata
- Class: Arachnida
- Order: Schizomida
- Family: Hubbardiidae
- Genus: Notozomus
- Species: N. curiosus

Binomial name
- Notozomus curiosus Harvey, 2000

Species of short-tailed whip-scorpion

Notozomus curiosus is a species of schizomid arachnid (commonly known as short-tailed whip-scorpions) in the Hubbardiidae family. It is endemic to Australia. It was described in 2000 by Australian arachnologist Mark Harvey. The specific epithet curiosus (Latin: ‘odd’ or ‘strange’) refers to the uncertain generic position of this unusual species.

== Distribution and habitat ==
The species occurs in Far North Queensland, inhabiting plant litter in open forest habitats. The type locality is Mission Beach in the Cassowary Coast Region.

== Behaviour ==
The arachnids are terrestrial predators.
