= Notozomus ker =

Scientific classification
- Kingdom: Animalia
- Phylum: Arthropoda
- Subphylum: Chelicerata
- Class: Arachnida
- Order: Schizomida
- Family: Hubbardiidae
- Genus: Notozomus
- Species: N. ker

Binomial name
- Notozomus ker Harvey, 1992

Species of short-tailed whip-scorpion

Notozomus ker is a species of schizomid arachnid (commonly known as short-tailed whip-scorpions) in the Hubbardiidae family. It is endemic to Australia. It was described in 1992 by Australian arachnologist Mark Harvey.

== Distribution and habitat ==
The species occurs in Far North Queensland, inhabiting plant litter in closed forest habitats. The type locality is Cableway Base Station in the Bellenden Ker Range.

== Behaviour ==
The arachnids are terrestrial predators.
