= Notozomus maurophila =

Scientific classification
- Kingdom: Animalia
- Phylum: Arthropoda
- Subphylum: Chelicerata
- Class: Arachnida
- Order: Schizomida
- Family: Hubbardiidae
- Genus: Notozomus
- Species: N. maurophila

Binomial name
- Notozomus maurophila Harvey, 2000

Species of short-tailed whip-scorpion

Notozomus maurophila is a species of schizomid arachnid (commonly known as short-tailed whip-scorpions) in the Hubbardiidae family. It is endemic to Australia. It was described in 2000 by Australian arachnologist Mark Harvey. The specific epithet maurophila, from Greek mauros (‘dark’) and phila (‘fondness’), refers to the proximity of the type locality to Black Mountain.

== Description ==
The body length of the holotype male is 3.58 mm. It is yellow-brown in colour.

== Distribution and habitat ==
The species occurs in Far North Queensland, inhabiting plant litter in closed forest habitats. The type locality is rainforest at an elevation of 1,200 m on Black Mountain Road, 5 km north of Kuranda.

== Behaviour ==
The arachnids are terrestrial predators.
