= Notozomus majesticus =

Scientific classification
- Kingdom: Animalia
- Phylum: Arthropoda
- Subphylum: Chelicerata
- Class: Arachnida
- Order: Schizomida
- Family: Hubbardiidae
- Genus: Notozomus
- Species: N. majesticus

Binomial name
- Notozomus majesticus Harvey, 2000

Species of short-tailed whip-scorpion

Notozomus majesticus is a species of schizomid arachnid (commonly known as short-tailed whip-scorpions) in the Hubbardiidae family. It is endemic to Australia. It was described in 2000 by Australian arachnologist Mark Harvey. The specific epithet majesticus refers to the size and appearance.

== Description ==
Body length of the holotype male is 4.35 mm; that of the paratype female is 4.25 mm. They are dark yellow-brown in colour.

== Distribution and habitat ==
The species occurs in Far North Queensland, inhabiting plant litter in closed forest habitats. The type locality is the south-east Windsor Tableland region.

== Behaviour ==
The arachnids are terrestrial predators.
