= Bloomfield Track =

Coordinates: 15°51′27.64″S 145°19′35.65″E

Bloomfield Track Queensland
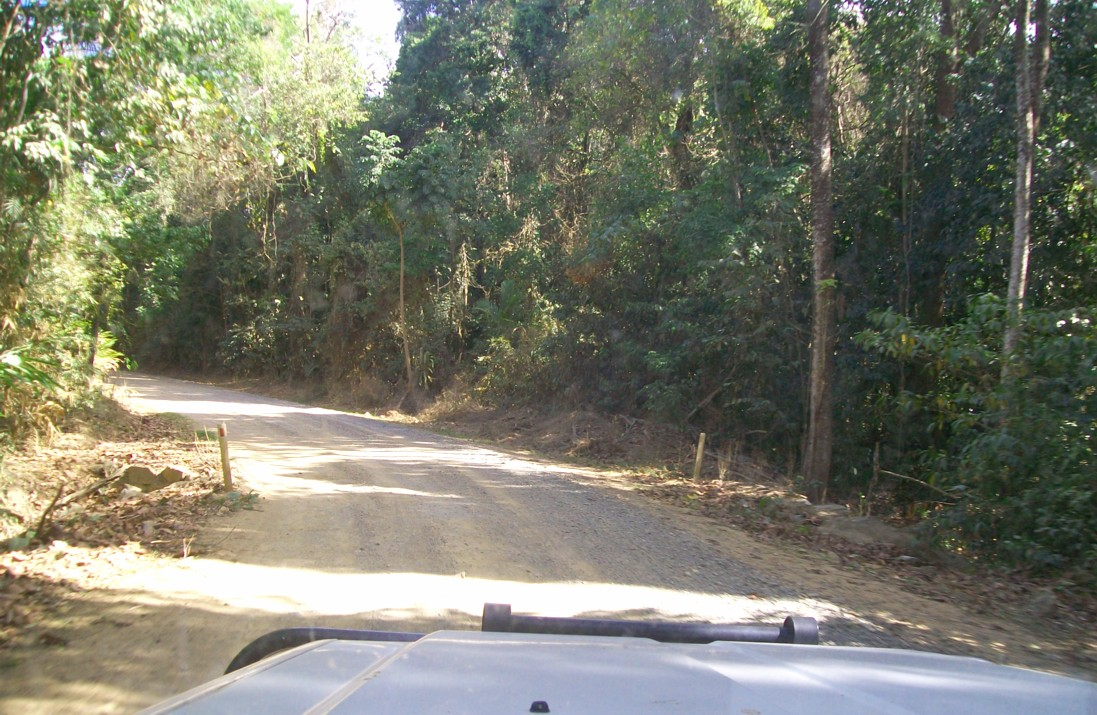
- Driving along the Bloomfield Track, September 2009

General information
- Type: Rural road
- Length: 30 km (19 mi)
- Opened: 1984

Major junctions
- North end: Wujal Wujal
- South end: Cape Tribulation

The Bloomfield Track, which is also known as the Coast Road or officially, the Cape Tribulation-Bloomfield Road, is a controversial four-wheel-drive road in Far North Queensland, Australia. The road's construction through untouched wilderness was the cause of protests and blockades in the early 1980s.

The road was completed in 1984, connecting Cape Tribulation to Cooktown. This route is an alternative to the Mulligan Highway further inland. It passes over the Donovan and Cowie Ranges. To reduce the environment impact the road was designed with few switchbacks and bends on the climbs resulting in patches of steep gradients over the ranges. The track itself is 30 km in length.

The road is only partially sealed and may be impassable after heavy rains. Access to Bloomfield Falls and the aboriginal community of Wujal Wujal is provided by the road which also crosses the Bloomfield River. Tourism along the Bloomfield Track has been popular. Visitors are drawn to the pristine rainforest, swimming holes, creeks and beaches.

== Access ==
The track begins at Cape Tribulation and winds its way north through the Daintree Rainforest, crossing many creeks in the process; then it ends at the aboriginal community Wujal Wujal. Many local authorities recommend that the journey should be undertaken in a four-wheel-drive vehicle, however recent upgrades have been undertaken (including the construction of bridges at the Bloomfield River and Woobooda Creek crossings in 2014/15, as well as paving works on the Cowie and Donovan Ranges) that make the road more suitable for some two-wheel-drive vehicles, provided that they are driven with care in dry weather only.

== Protests ==
Douglas Shire Council and the Government of Queensland supported the road's development. Environmentalists opposed the road on the basis that it would bring unwanted development to an area of high environmental significance. Blockades against bulldozers brought police and arrests were made. This resulted in national and international attention to the issue. The campaign to protect the Daintree Rainforest through which the road passed eventually resulted in the area being declared a World Heritage Site. The Queensland Government opposed the World Heritage listing. It took the issue to the High Court of Australia to stop it but was unsuccessful.

== See also ==
- Quaid Road
