= Notozomus faustus =

Scientific classification
- Kingdom: Animalia
- Phylum: Arthropoda
- Subphylum: Chelicerata
- Class: Arachnida
- Order: Schizomida
- Family: Hubbardiidae
- Genus: Notozomus
- Species: N. faustus

Binomial name
- Notozomus faustus Harvey, 2000

Species of short-tailed whip-scorpion

Notozomus faustus is a species of schizomid arachnid (commonly known as short-tailed whip-scorpions) in the Hubbardiidae family. It is endemic to Australia. It was described in 2000 by Australian arachnologist Mark Harvey. The specific epithet faustus (Latin: ‘fortunate’ or ‘lucky’) refers to the luck involved in collecting this small species.

== Distribution and habitat ==
The species occurs in North Queensland, inhabiting plant litter in closed forest habitats. The type locality is Conway National Park, some 900 km north-west of Brisbane.

== Behaviour ==
The arachnids are terrestrial predators.
