= Notozomus bronwenae =

Scientific classification
- Kingdom: Animalia
- Phylum: Arthropoda
- Subphylum: Chelicerata
- Class: Arachnida
- Order: Schizomida
- Family: Hubbardiidae
- Genus: Notozomus
- Species: N. bronwenae

Binomial name
- Notozomus bronwenae Harvey, 2000

Species of short-tailed whip-scorpion

Notozomus bronwenae is a species of schizomid arachnid (commonly known as short-tailed whip-scorpions) in the Hubbardiidae family. It is endemic to Australia. It was described in 2000 by Australian arachnologist Mark Harvey. The specific epithet bronwenae honours Bronwen Scott for her assistance with the collection of the type specimens.

== Distribution and habitat ==
The species occurs in North Queensland, inhabiting plant litter in closed forest habitats. The type locality is Wishing Pool in the Eungella National Park.

== Behaviour ==
The arachnids are terrestrial predators.
