= Wujal Wujal Aboriginal Shire =

- Local government area

- Interactive map of Wujal Wujal Aboriginal Shire
- Coordinates: 13.0188°S 143.2394°E
- Country: Australia
- State: Queensland
- Region: Far North Queensland
- Council seat: Wujal Wujal

Government
  - Mayor: Bradley Travis Shane Creek
  - State electorate: Cook
  - Federal division: Leichhardt

Area
  - Total: 12 km^{2} (4.6 sq mi)

Population
  - Total: 276 (2021 census)
  - Density: 23.0/km^{2} (59.6/sq mi)
- Website: Wujal Wujal Aboriginal Shire
LGAs around Wujal Wujal Aboriginal Shire
Douglas	Cook	Cook
Douglas	Wujal Wujal	Douglas
Douglas	Douglas	Douglas

The Wujal Wujal Aboriginal Shire is a local government area in Far North Queensland, Australia. It is managed as a Deed of Grant in Trust under the Local Government (Community Government Areas) Act 2004.

In the 2021 census, the Wujal Wujal Aboriginal Shire had a population of 276.

== Geography ==
It is on the east coast of the Cape York Peninsula excised from the Shire of Douglas and consists of a single locality, Wujal Wujal which is split into two disjoint areas separated by the Bloomfield River (the river itself remaining part of Shire of Douglas).

== History ==
Kuku Yalanji (also known as Gugu Yalanji, Kuku Yalaja, and Kuku Yelandji) is an Australian Aboriginal language of the Mossman and Daintree areas of North Queensland. The language region includes areas within the local government area of Shire of Douglas and Shire of Cook, particularly the localities of Mossman, Daintree, Bloomfield River, China Camp, Maytown, Palmer, Cape Tribulation and Wujal Wujal.

Yalanji (also known as Kuku Yalanji, Kuku Yalaja, Kuku Yelandji, and Gugu Yalanji) is an Australian Aboriginal language of Far North Queensland. The traditional language region is Mossman River in the south to the Annan River in the north, bordered by the Pacific Ocean in the east and extending inland to west of Mount Mulgrave. This includes the local government boundaries of the Shire of Douglas, the Shire of Cook and the Aboriginal Shire of Wujal Wujal and the towns and localities of Cooktown, Mossman, Daintree, Cape Tribulation and Wujal Wujal. It includes the head of the Palmer River, the Bloomfield River, China Camp, Maytown, and Palmerville.

== Demographics ==
In the 2021 census, the Wujal Wujal Aboriginal Shire had a population of 276.

In the 2016 census, the Wujal Wujal Aboriginal Shire had a population of 282.

In the 2011 census, the Wujal Wujal Aboriginal Shire had a population of 270.

In the 2006 census, the Wujal Wujal Aboriginal Shire had a population of 326.

== Amenities ==
The Wujal Wujal Aboriginal Shire Council operate the Wujal Wujal Indigenous Knowledge Centre at Wujal Wujal.

== List of mayors ==
- 2020–present: Bradley Travis Shane Creek
