= Upper Daintree, Queensland =

Upper Daintree
- Suburb
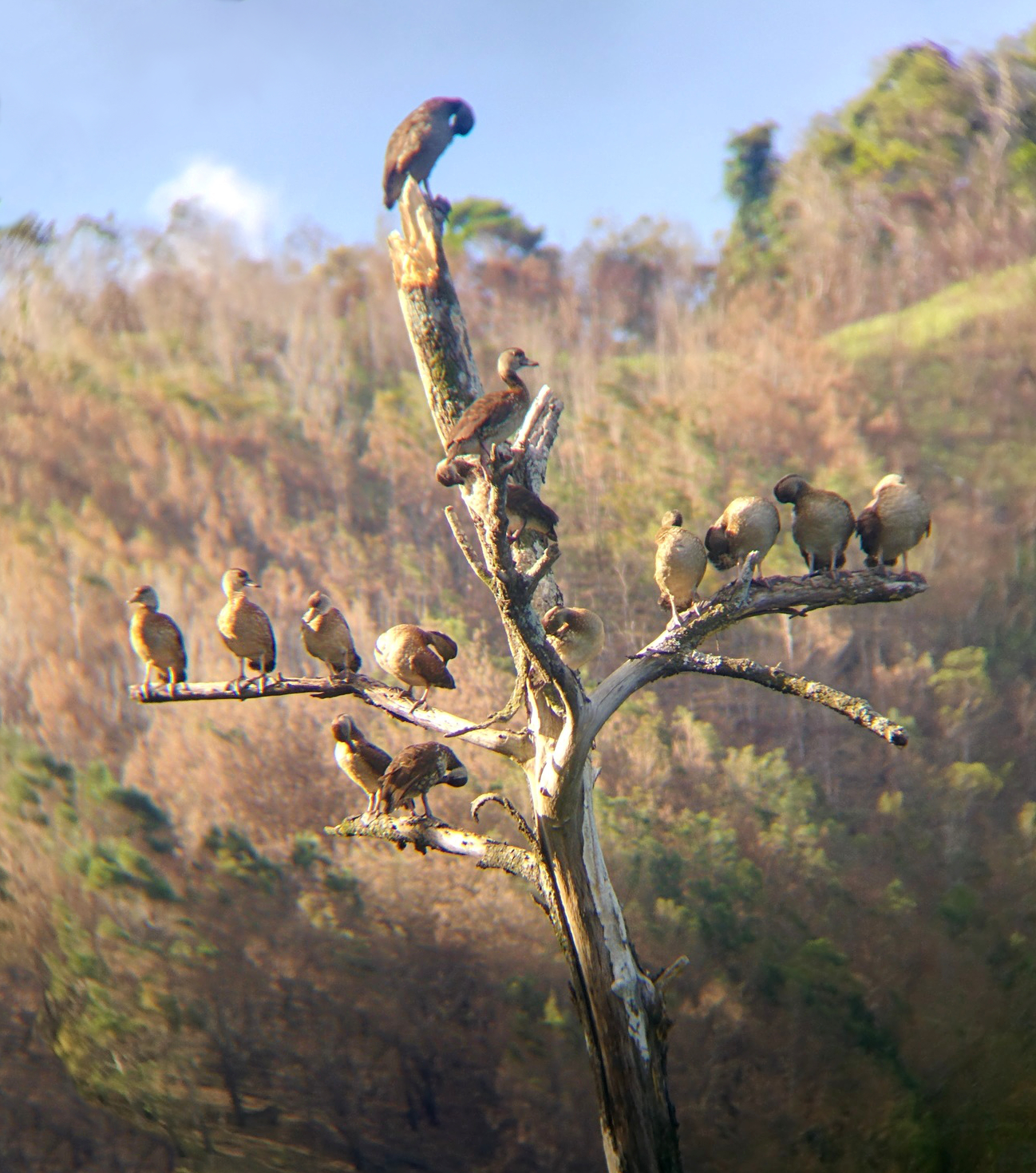
- Spotted Whistling Duck (Dendrocygna guttata) in Upper Daintree, 2016

- Interactive map of Upper Daintree
- Coordinates: 16.2163°S 145.3047°E
- Country: Australia
- State: Queensland
- LGA: Shire of Douglas
- Location: 10.1 km (6.3 mi) NNW of Daintree; 45.5 km (28.3 mi) N of Mossman; 121 km (75 mi) NNW of Cairns; 1,813 km (1,127 mi) NNW of Brisbane

Government
  - State electorate: Cook
  - Federal division: Leichhardt

Area
  - Total: 25.4 km^{2} (9.8 sq mi)

Population
  - Total: 21 (2021 census)
  - Density: 0.827/km^{2} (2.14/sq mi)
- Time zone: UTC+10:00 (AEST)
- Postcode: 4873
Suburbs around Upper Daintree
Dagmar	Noah	Noah
Dagmar	Upper Daintree	Forest Creek
Dagmar	Stewart Creek Valley	Daintree

Upper Daintree is a rural locality in the Shire of Douglas, Queensland, Australia. In the 2021 census, Upper Daintree had a population of 21 people.

== Geography ==
As the name suggests, the locality of Upper Daintree is upstream on the Daintree River from the town and locality of Daintree. The river enters the locality from the north-west (Dagmar / Noah) and then flows south-east, exiting the locality to the south (Daintree / Forest Creek).

Allanton is a pocket (surrounded by the Daintree River) on 3 sides in the south-east corner of the locality (16.2431°S 145.3116°E).

Upper Daintree Road enters the locality from the south (Stewart Creek Valley) and closely follows the course of the river on the southern/western side but does not reach the northern extent of the locality. It is the only road through the locality.

The land use is grazing on native vegetation.

== Demographics ==
In the 2016 census, Upper Daintree had a population of 9 people.

In the 2021 census, Upper Daintree had a population of 21 people.

== Education ==
There are no schools in Upper Daintree. The nearest government primary school is Daintree State School in Daintree to the south-east. The nearest government secondary school is Mossman State High School in Mossman to the south, but it would be too distant for students in some parts of Upper Daintree with the alternatives being distance education and boarding school.
