= Mossman River =

River in Far North Queensland, Australia

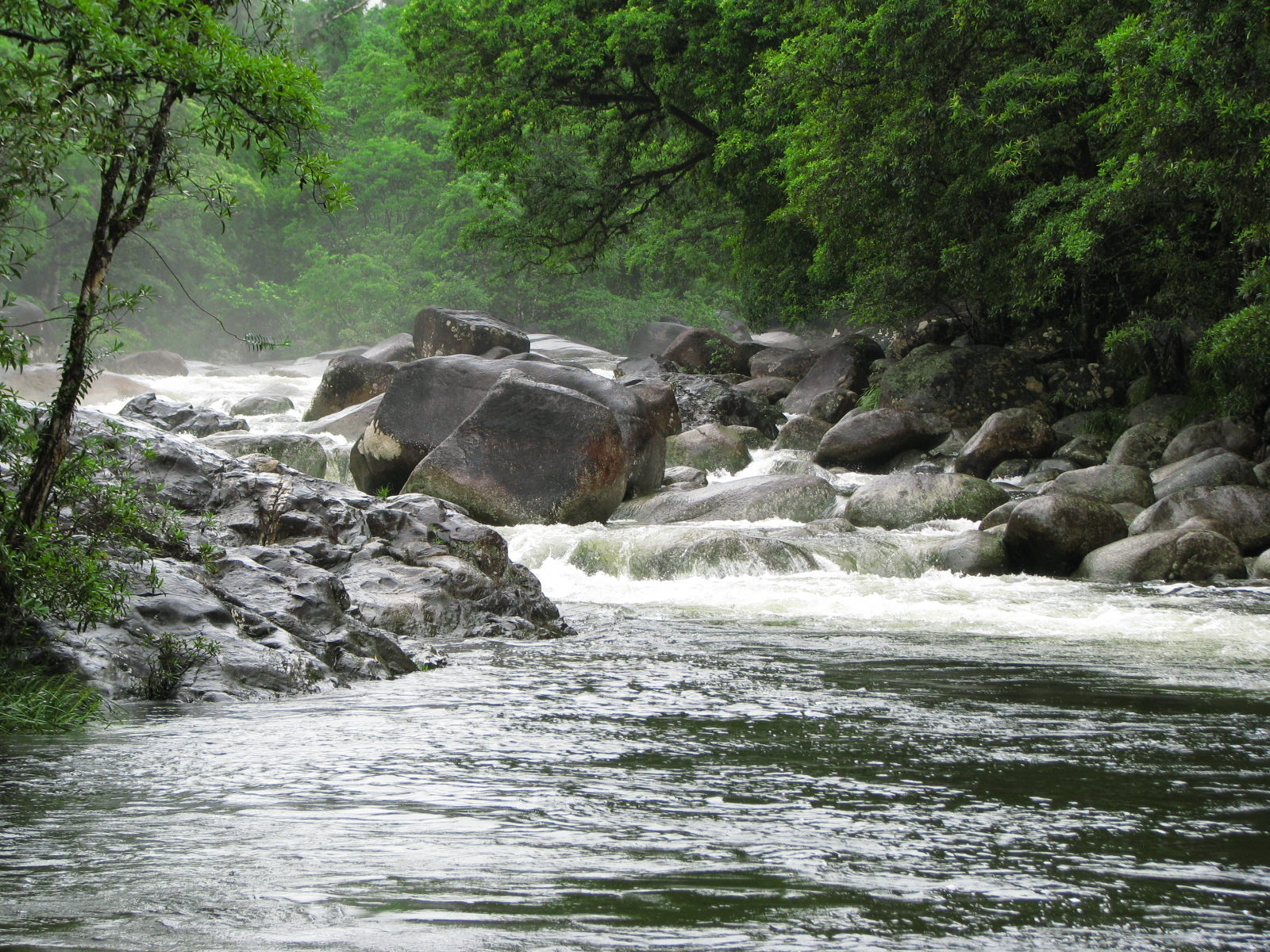
- The Mossman River during the wet season, 2010

- Location of Mossman River mouth in Queensland
- Etymology: In honour of Hugh Mosman
- Native name: Jinkalmu (Kuku-Yalanji)

Location
- Country: Australia
- State: Queensland
- Region: Far North Queensland, Cape York Peninsula
- City: Mossman

Physical characteristics
- Source: Great Dividing Range
  - location: below Devil's Thumb
  - coordinates: 16.42951°S 145.25384°E
  - elevation: 1,050 m (3,440 ft)
- Mouth: Trinity Bay, Coral Sea
  - location: between Newell and Cooya Beach
  - coordinates: 16.43474°S 145.40533°E
  - elevation: 0 m (0 ft)
- Length: 24 km (15 mi)
- Basin size: 218.2 km^{2} (84.2 sq mi)
- Discharge
  - location: Near mouth
  - average: 5.1 m^{3}/s (160 GL/a)

Basin features
- National park: Daintree National Park

The Mossman River (Kuku-Yalanji: Jinkalmu) is a river in lower Cape York Peninsula, Queensland, Australia.

== Geography ==
The headwaters of the river rise under Devils Thumb on the Mount Carbine Tableland in the Great Dividing Range. The river flows through a deeply incised valley in the Mount Lewis Forest Reserve in an easterly direction and then through the Mossman Gorge, part of the Daintree National Park, and onto the coastal plain past the township of Mossman, where the river is crossed by the Captain Cook Highway. The river eventually discharges into Trinity Bay and the Coral Sea between Newell and Cooya Beach. The river descends 1,050 metres (3,440 ft) over its 24-kilometre (15 mi) course.

The river has a catchment area of 472 square kilometres (182 sq mi) of which an area of 16 square kilometres (6 sq mi) is composed of estuarine wetlands.

== History ==
The traditional language area of Kuka-Dyangan (also known as Djangun, Gugu Djangun and Kuka Djangun) includes landscape within the local government boundaries of the Douglas Shire and Cook Shire.

Yalanji (also known as Kuku Yalanji, Kuku Yalaja, Kuku Yelandji, and Gugu Yalanji) is an Australian Aboriginal language of Far North Queensland. The traditional language region is Mossman River in the south to the Annan River in the north, bordered by the Pacific Ocean in the east and extending inland to west of Mount Mulgrave. This includes the local government boundaries of the Shire of Douglas, the Shire of Cook and the Aboriginal Shire of Wujal Wujal and the towns and localities of Cooktown, Mossman, Daintree, Cape Tribulation and Wujal Wujal. It includes the head of the Palmer River, the Bloomfield River, China Camp, Maytown, and Palmerville.

The river was named by the explorer George Dalrymple in 1873 after Hugh Mosman who discovered gold in Charters Towers. Dalrymple wrote "I named this river the Mossman River, after Mossman, an explorer and mining man, member of a very prominent mining family."

== See also ==
- List of rivers of Australia § Queensland
