= Notozomus =

Scientific classification
- Domain: Eukaryota
- Kingdom: Animalia
- Phylum: Arthropoda
- Subphylum: Chelicerata
- Class: Arachnida
- Order: Schizomida
- Family: Hubbardiidae
- Genus: Notozomus; Harvey, 1992

Type species
- Notozomus aterpes Harvey, 1992

Species
- 17, see text

Genus of short-tailed whip-scorpions

Notozomus is a genus of hubbardiid short-tailed whip-scorpions. It is endemic to Australia and was first described by Mark Harvey in 1992.

== Species ==
As of September 2023, the World Arachnida Catalog accepted the following seventeen species from Queensland:

- Notozomus aterpes Harvey, 1992
- Notozomus boonah Harvey, 2000
- Notozomus bronwenae Harvey, 2000
- Notozomus curiosus Harvey, 2000
- Notozomus daviesae Harvey, 1992
- Notozomus elongatus Harvey, 2000
- Notozomus faustus Harvey, 2000
- Notozomus ingham Harvey, 1992
- Notozomus jacquelinae Harvey, 2000
- Notozomus ker Harvey, 1992
- Notozomus majesticus Harvey, 2000
- Notozomus maurophila Harvey, 2000
- Notozomus monteithi Harvey, 1992
- Notozomus raveni Harvey, 1992
- Notozomus rentzi Harvey, 1992
- Notozomus spec (Harvey, 1992)
- Notozomus wudjl Harvey, 2000
