= Notozomus boonah =

Scientific classification
- Kingdom: Animalia
- Phylum: Arthropoda
- Subphylum: Chelicerata
- Class: Arachnida
- Order: Schizomida
- Family: Hubbardiidae
- Genus: Notozomus
- Species: N. boonah

Binomial name
- Notozomus boonah Harvey, 2000

Species of short-tailed whip-scorpion

Notozomus boonah is a species of schizomid arachnid, commonly known as a short-tailed whip-scorpions in the family Hubbardiidae. It is endemic to Australia and was described in 2000 by Australian arachnologist Mark Harvey. The specific epithet boonah refers to the type locality.

== Distribution and habitat ==
The species occurs in south-east Queensland, where it inhabits plant litter in closed forest habitats. The type locality is Boonah, in the Scenic Rim Region.

== Behaviour ==
The arachnids are terrestrial predators.
