= Palmer River =

River in Queensland, Australia

Palmer
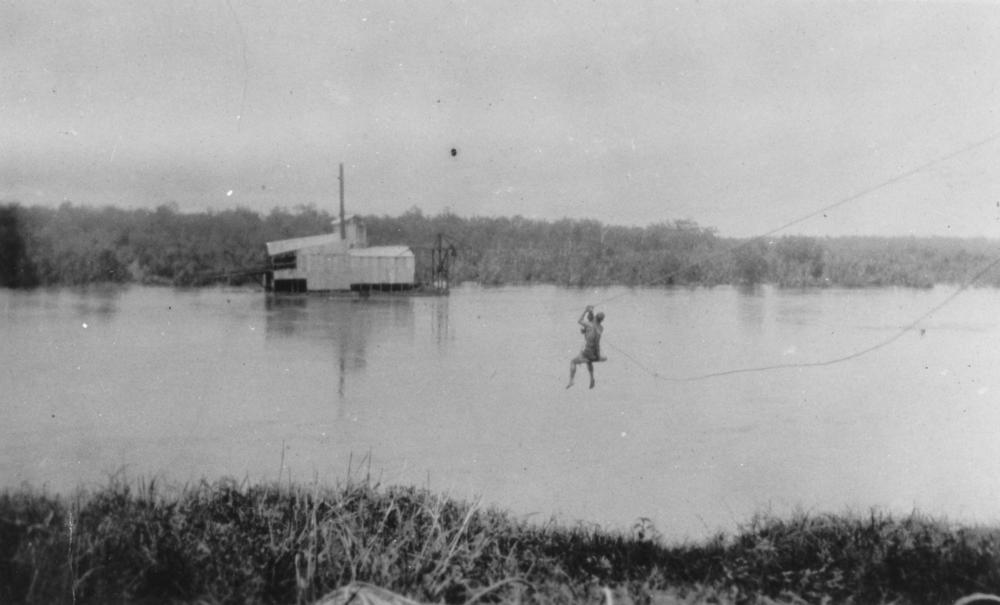
- A gold mining dredge on the Palmer River

- Location of Palmer River mouth in Queensland
- Etymology: In honour of Sir Arthur Hunter Palmer

Location
- Country: Australia
- State: Queensland
- Region: Far North Queensland

Physical characteristics
- Source: Sussex Range, Great Dividing Range
- Source confluence: Prospect Creek and Campbell Creek
  - location: near Palmer River Roadhouse
  - coordinates: 16°06′18″S 144°46′52″E
  - elevation: 429 m (1,407 ft)
- Mouth: confluence with the Mitchell River
  - location: northeast of Staaten River National Park
  - coordinates: 16°04′52″S 142°42′49″E
  - elevation: 64 m (210 ft)
- Length: 327 km (203 mi)
- Basin size: 8,335 km^{2} (3,218 sq mi)

Basin features
- River system: Mitchell River catchment
- Tributaries
  - left: South Palmer River
  - right: Little Palmer River, North Palmer River

The Palmer River is a river in Far North Queensland, Australia. The area surrounding the river was the site of a gold rush in the late 19th century which started in 1873.

== Course and features ==
The lands around the headwaters of the Palmer River were part of the territory of the Kuku Yalanji, Western Yalanji and Gugu Mini Aboriginal peoples of Far North Queensland. These headwaters rise in the Sussex Range, part of the Great Dividing Range southwest of Cooktown. The river is formed by the confluence of the Prospect Creek and Campbell Creek, near Palmer River Roadhouse, south of Lakeland. The Palmer River flows west across the Cape York Peninsula towards the Gulf of Carpentaria joined by 29 tributaries including the South Palmer River, Little Palmer River and North Palmer River, before reaching its confluence with the Mitchell River northeast of Staaten River National Park. The river descends 365 metres (1,198 ft) over its 327-kilometre (203 mi) course and has a catchment area of 8,335 square kilometres (3,218 sq mi).

== History ==
=== Aboriginal history ===
Yalanji (also known as Kuku Yalanji, Kuku Yalaja, Kuku Yelandji, and Gugu Yalanji) is an Australian Aboriginal language of Far North Queensland. The traditional language region is Mossman River in the south to the Annan River in the north, bordered by the Pacific Ocean in the east and extending inland to west of Mount Mulgrave. This includes the local government boundaries of the Shire of Douglas, the Shire of Cook and the Aboriginal Shire of Wujal Wujal and the towns and localities of Cooktown, Mossman, Daintree, Cape Tribulation and Wujal Wujal. It includes the head of the Palmer River, the Bloomfield River, China Camp, Maytown, and Palmerville.

=== Palmer River Goldfields ===
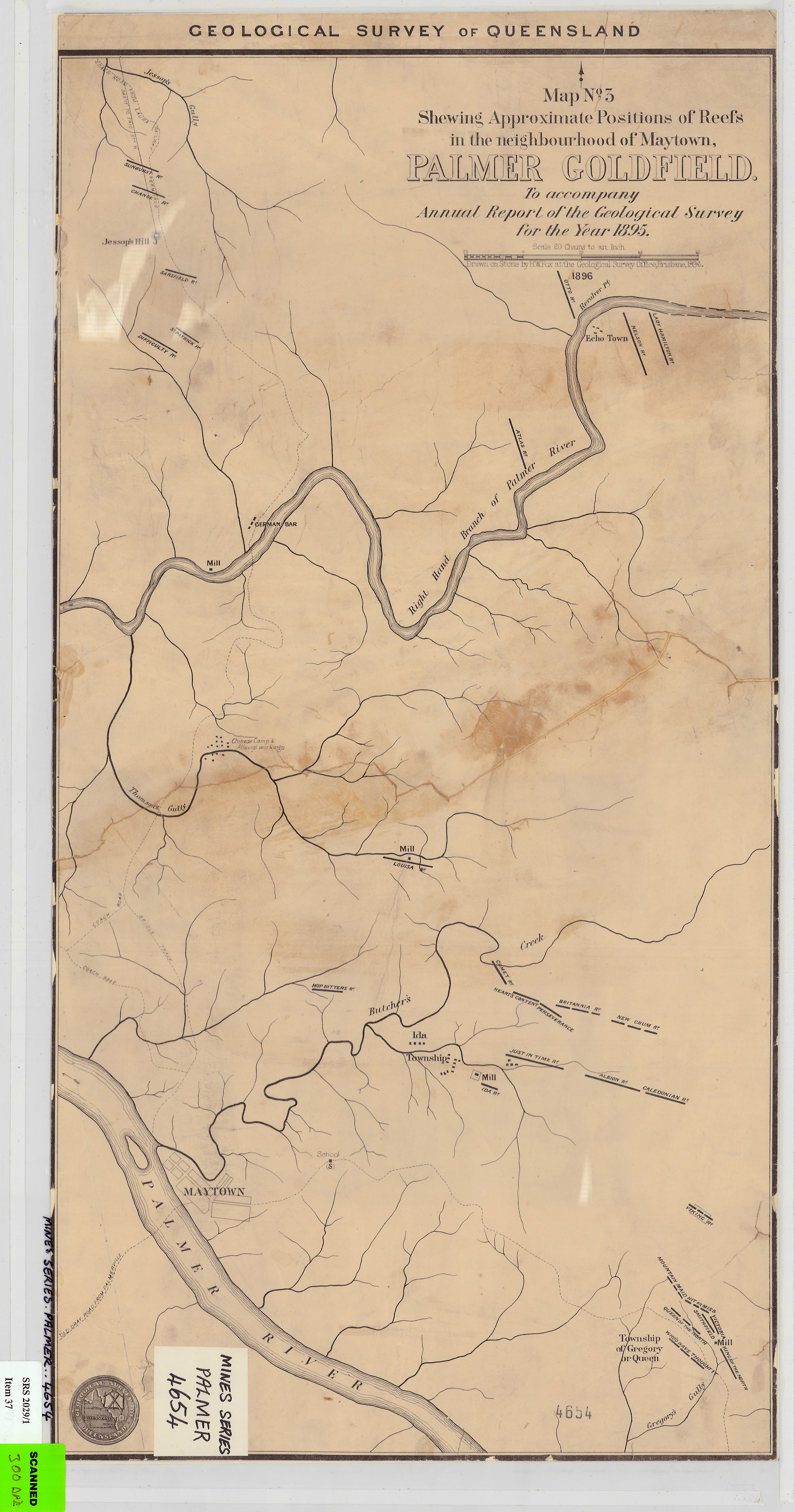
Map showing approximate positions of gold reefs in the neighbourhood of Maytown, 1896

Palmer River was one of Australia's major gold rush locations. William Hann and geologist Norman Taylor found gold in a sandy bed of the river in 1872. Hann named the river after Arthur Hunter Palmer the Premier of Queensland at that time.

In 1873, access to the goldfields was established by Archibald Campbell MacMillan who led an expedition of 110 diggers, police and officials which blazed a trail from the port of Cooktown to the Palmer River. They "shot a lot" and "hunted" Aboriginal people along the way at the Normanby River, Kennedy River, Kavanaugh Creek, St George River and at Battle Camp. At Battle Camp, a large group of Aboriginal men approached MacMillan's camp yelling a war cry, but were forced back by gunfire, some of whom fell. The expedition members then pursued them to a lagoon where many more were shot. Two Aboriginal women and three children were brought back to the camp by the diggers after one of the shootings, where they had in their possession a number of items from a digger who had supposedly been killed. A later government enquiry into the events found that the diggers acted in self defence and were justified in their actions.

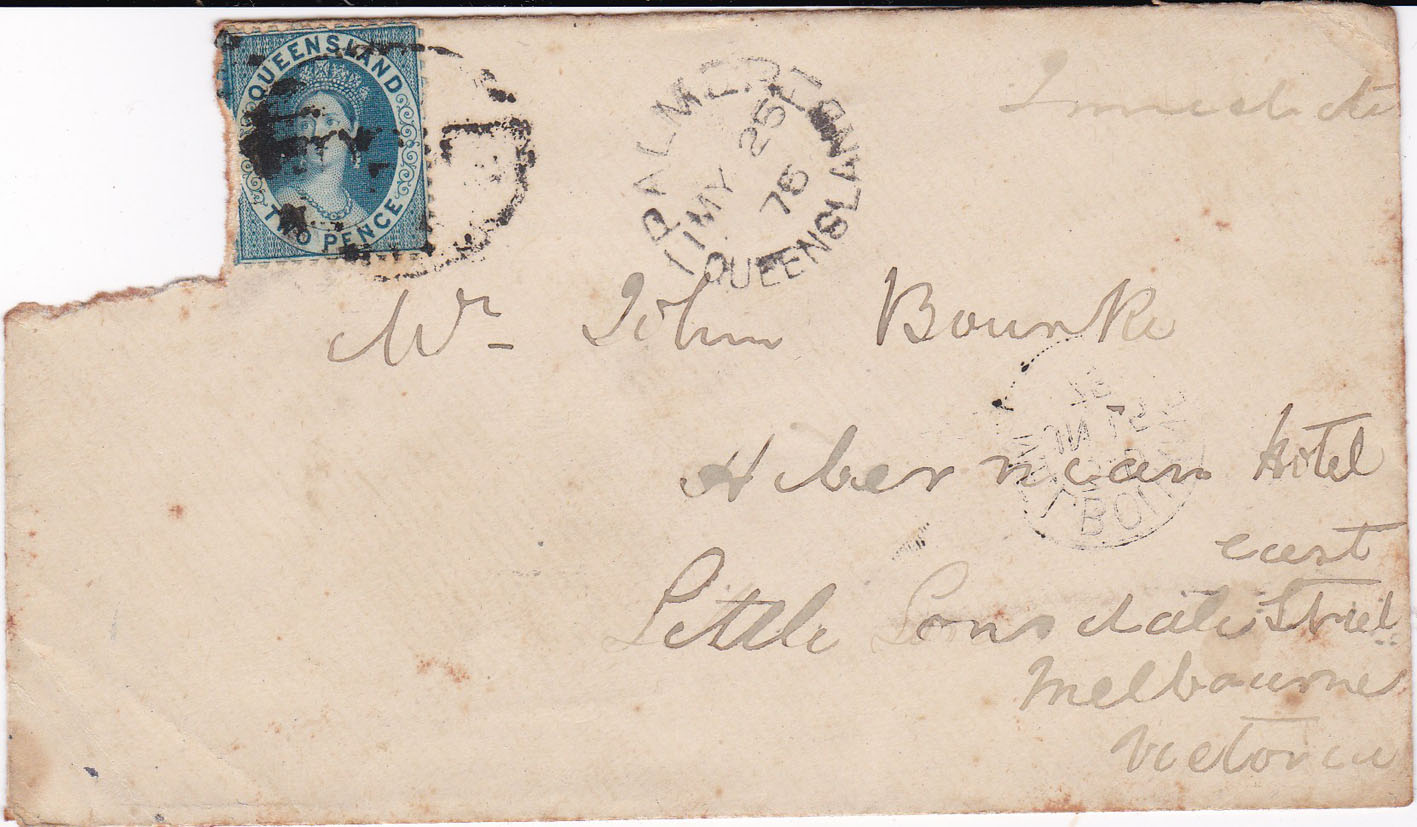
The earliest known letter from the goldfield

The main settlement of the gold field was Maytown replacing Palmerville after some months. The settlement began as a camp in 1873, then grew into a town which served as the administration centre for the former Hann Local Government Area. The settlements of Byerstown and Idatown were also established along the river.

Palmerville Post Office opened on 11 May 1874 (closed 1965); Maytown Post Office opened on 7 June 1874 (closed 1945); Byerstown Post Office opened on 1 April 1876 (closed around 1884).

There were many other confrontations between the Anglo-Australian diggers, Chinese miners and the Aborigines from the area after Battle Camp.

From 1874 until 1877 more than 20,000 Chinese immigrants arrived at the river. The miners in the Palmer River included Chinese, mostly from the Guangdong Province in southern China. The Chinese miners would re-work the diggings of Europeans as they moved on to find richer diggings. In 1876, with the rush to the Hodgkinson River, Chinese miners occupied most of the Palmer Gold Field. As gold reserves were extracted, anti-Chinese sentiment grew.

The Queensland government eventually responded to the influx with a poll tax of £10 according to the Chinese Immigration Regulation Act 1877.

Although most of the surface gold has long since been prospected, there remain a handful of deeper mine projects in the area.

== Tourism ==
Palmer River has various stops including:

- Palmer Roadhouse (including caravan park and small museum)
- Palmerville Station Campground

Tours to Palmer River and surroundings can be arranged as a day trip from Cooktown.

It may still be possible to prospect for gold in some areas.

== See also ==
- List of rivers of Australia § Queensland
- Butcher's Hill (cattle station)
