= Bloomfield, Queensland =

Bloomfield
- Town
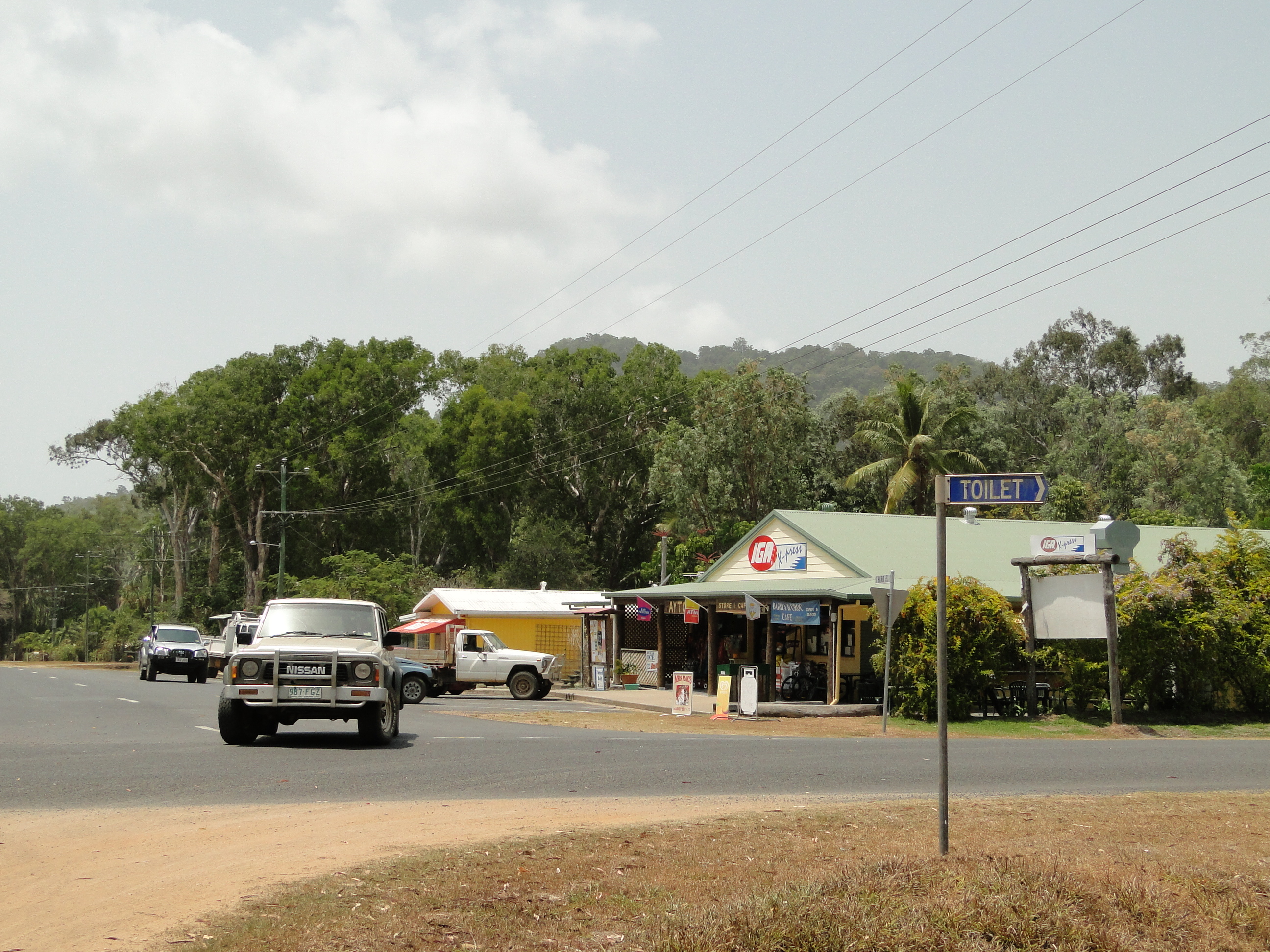
- Ayton general store, 2009

- Interactive map of Bloomfield
- Coordinates: 15.9333°S 145.3416°E
- Country: Australia
- State: Queensland
- LGAs: Shire of Cook; Shire of Douglas
- Location: 63.2 km (39.3 mi) S of Cooktown; 103 km (64 mi) N of Mossman; 179 km (111 mi) N of Cairns; 1,884 km (1,171 mi) NNW of Brisbane

Government
  - State electorate: Cook
  - Federal division: Leichhardt

Area
  - Total: 832.1 km^{2} (321.3 sq mi)

Population
  - Total: 228 (2021 census)
  - Density: 0.2740/km^{2} (0.7097/sq mi)
- Time zone: UTC+10:00 (AEST)
- Postcode: 4895
Localities around Bloomfield
Rossville	Rossville	Coral Sea
Lakeland	Bloomfield	Wujal Wujal; Degarra; Cape Tribulation
Dedin	Dagmar	Noah

Bloomfield is a rural town in the Shire of Cook and a coastal locality which is split between the Shire of Cook and the Shire of Douglas in Queensland, Australia. The neighbourhood of Ayton is within the locality (15°55′17″S 145°21′11″E). In the 2021 census, the locality of Bloomfield had a population of 228 people.

The neighbourhood of China Camp is an abandoned tin mining area within the locality (16.045°S 145.300°E).

== Geography ==
The locality of Bloomfield is geographically divided into a northern section in the Shire of Cook and a southern section in the Shire of Douglas. The narrow boundary between the two sections is about 1 kilometre (0.62 mi) in width and follows Granite Creek, a tributary of the Bloomfield River which passes through the locality to its mouth at the Coral Sea.

Much of the northern section of Bloomfield is within the Ngalba Bulal National Park. Much of the southern section of Bloomfield is within the Ngalba Bulal National Park and the Daintree National Park.

Although Bloomfield (15°56′00″S 145°20′30″E) is officially the population centre, in practice, there is little there apart from the school. Most of the development is in Ayton, on the northern bank of the Bloomfield River near its mouth.

== History ==
Yalanji (also known as Kuku Yalanji, Kuku Yalaja, Kuku Yelandji, and Gugu Yalanji) is an Australian Aboriginal language of Far North Queensland. The traditional language region is Mossman River in the south to the Annan River in the north, bordered by the Pacific Ocean in the east and extending inland to west of Mount Mulgrave. This includes the local government boundaries of the Shire of Douglas, the Shire of Cook and the Aboriginal Shire of Wujal Wujal and the towns and localities of Cooktown, Mossman, Daintree, Cape Tribulation and Wujal Wujal. It includes the head of the Palmer River, the Bloomfield River, China Camp, Maytown, and Palmerville.

The town and locality are named after the Bloomfield River.

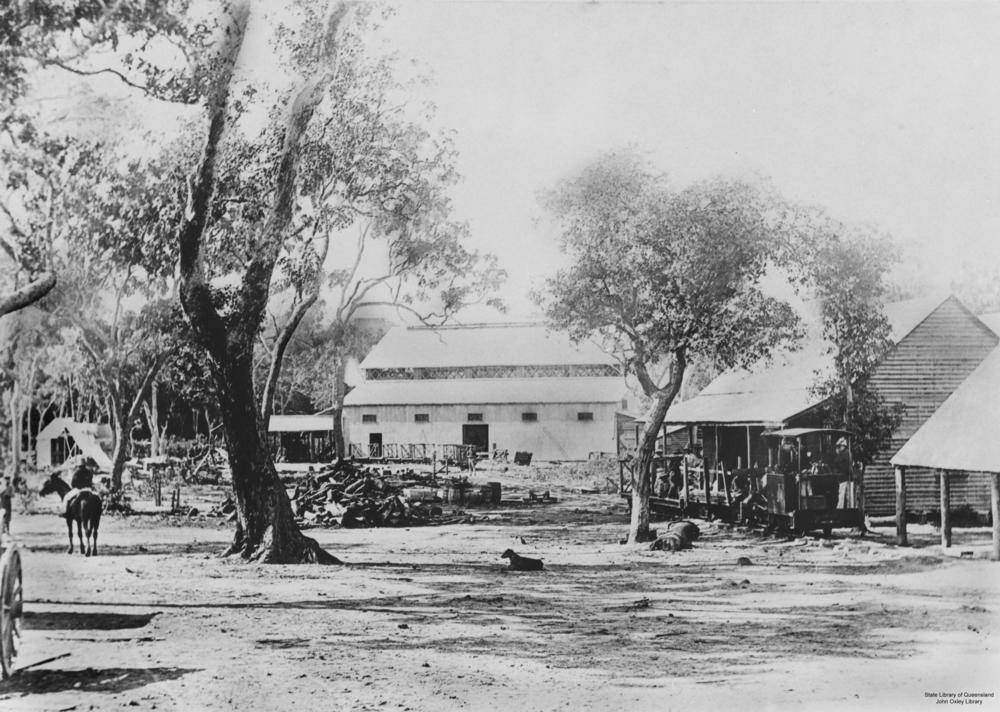
Bloomfield River Sugar Company Mill, circa 1887

The Bloomfield River Sugar Company was established in 1882 by Frederick Bauer and his two sons. They established a sugarcane plantation that they called Vilele. The sugar mill they constructed did its first full-scale crush in 1885. In 1886 they built a saw mill and had 10 miles (16 km) of tramway built from portable track. The sugar mill closed in 1890 as it proved to be not economic.

Ayton Provisional School opened on the road from Cape Tribulation to Cooktown circa 1897. On 1 January 1909 it became Ayton State School. It 1924 it was closed due to low student numbers.

Bloomfield River State School opened on 16 July 1952.

Prior to the deamalgamation of Shire of Douglas on 1 January 2014, Bloomfield was split between Shire of Cook and Cairns Region.

== Demographics ==
In the 2011 census, the locality of Bloomfield had a population of 403 people.

In the 2016 census, the locality of Bloomfield had a population of 204 people.

In the 2021 census, the locality of Bloomfield had a population of 228 people.

== Facilities ==
Cook Shire Council operates a public library in Ayton.

== Education ==
Bloomfield River State School is a government primary (Prep-6) school for boys and girls at 3202 Rossville-Bloomfield Road (15.9352°S 145.3413°E). In 2017, the school had an enrolment of 41 students with 6 teachers and 9 non-teaching staff (5 full-time equivalent). Students in the north of the locality are served by Rossville State School in Rossville to the north, but there are no primary schools serving the south-western parts of Bloomfield.

The nearest government secondary school is Cooktown State School (to Year 12) in Cooktown to the north; however, it is so distant that only students in the north of Bloomfield could attend.

Where schools are unavailable, distance education and boarding schools are the alternatives.

== See also ==
- List of tramways in Queensland
