= Daintree, Queensland =

Daintree Julaymba (Kuku-Yalanji)
- Town
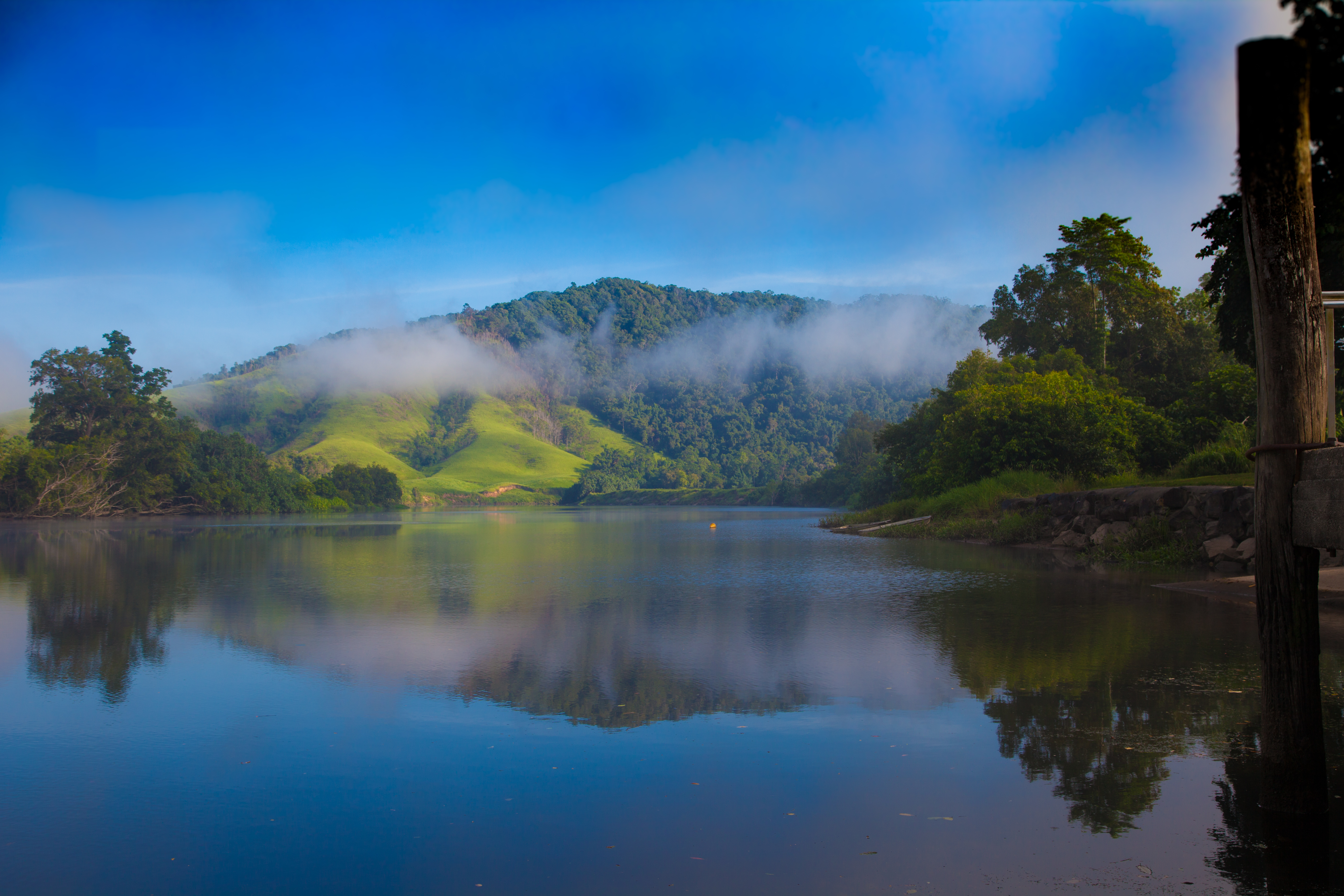
- Windy Reach, Daintree Village, 2016

- Interactive map of Daintree
- Coordinates: 16.2494°S 145.3213°E
- Country: Australia
- State: Queensland
- LGA: Shire of Douglas
- Location: 35.4 km (22.0 mi) N of Mossman; 55.3 km (34.4 mi) NNW of Port Douglas; 111 km (69 mi) NNW of Cairns; 1,812 km (1,126 mi) NNW of Brisbane

Government
  - State electorate: Cook
  - Federal division: Leichhardt

Area
  - Total: 6.3 km^{2} (2.4 sq mi)

Population
  - Total: 93 (2021 census)
  - Density: 14.76/km^{2} (38.2/sq mi)
- Time zone: AEST
- Postcode: 4873
Localities around Daintree
Upper Daintree	Forest Creek	Forest Creek
Stewart Creek Valley	Daintree	Lower Daintree
Stewart Creek Valley	Lower Daintree	Lower Daintree

Daintree (Kuku-Yalanji: Julaymba) is a rural town and locality in the Shire of Douglas, Queensland, Australia. In the 2021 census, the locality of Daintree had a population of 93 people.

== Geography ==
Daintree is a settlement in North Queensland 111 kilometres (69 mi) north of Cairns and 56 kilometres (35 mi) from Port Douglas, Queensland. The McDowell Ranges are near the town while the Daintree River flows nearby. It takes its name from Richard Daintree, a pioneering geologist of British origin in North Queensland in the 1860s. It is within the local government area of Shire of Douglas (between 2008 and 2013, it was within the Cairns Region). At the 2006 census, Daintree and the surrounding area had a population of 78.

== History ==
Kuku Yalanji (also known as Gugu Yalanji, Kuku Yalaja, and Kuku Yelandji) is an Australian Aboriginal language of the Mossman and Daintree areas of North Queensland. The language region includes areas within the local government area of Shire of Douglas and Shire of Cook, particularly the localities of Mossman, Daintree, Bloomfield River, China Camp, Maytown, Palmer, Cape Tribulation and Wujal Wujal.

Yalanji (also known as Kuku Yalanji, Kuku Yalaja, Kuku Yelandji, and Gugu Yalanji) is an Australian Aboriginal language of Far North Queensland. The traditional language region is Mossman River in the south to the Annan River in the north, bordered by the Pacific Ocean in the east and extending inland to west of Mount Mulgrave. This includes the local government boundaries of the Shire of Douglas, the Shire of Cook and the Aboriginal Shire of Wujal Wujal and the towns and localities of Cooktown, Mossman, Daintree, Cape Tribulation and Wujal Wujal. It includes the head of the Palmer River, the Bloomfield River, China Camp, Maytown, and Palmerville.

The town takes its name from the Daintree River, which was named on 6 December 1873 by explorer George Elphinstone Dalrymple, after geologist and photographer Richard Daintree (1832-1878).

Daintree Village was first settled in the late 1870s and early 1880s by timber workers seeking Toona Australis, commonly (if incorrectly) known as Red Cedar, in the nearby Daintree Rainforest. There were sizeable stocks of "Red Cedar" near the Daintree River. Loggers moved timber down the river to the coast using lashed rafts.

Dairy farms were later established, allowing a butter factory to be opened in 1924. Beef farming later became a significant local employer.

As elsewhere in Queensland, tourism has become an important employer. Daintree Village became famous for early morning tours on the Daintree River and has been popular with visiting birdwatchers. The dawn river trips became a catalyst for the many B&B's that sprang up, which are an important employer of local families.

Queensland's Wet Tropics became world heritage listed in 1986. Daintree is part of the wet tropics and the most famous national park close to the tourism hub of Port Douglas.

== Demographics ==
In the 2016 census, the locality of Daintree had a population of 129 people.

In the 2021 census, the locality of Daintree had a population of 93 people.

== Education ==
Daintree State School is a government primary (Prep–6) school for boys and girls at Osborne Street (16.2493°S 145.3202°E). In 2017, the school had an enrolment of 15 students with 2 teachers (1 full-time equivalent) and 5 non-teaching staff (2 full-time equivalent).

There are no secondary schools in Daintree. The nearest government secondary school is Mossman State High School in Mossman to the south.
