= Bloomfield River =

River in Far North Queensland, Australia

Bloomfield
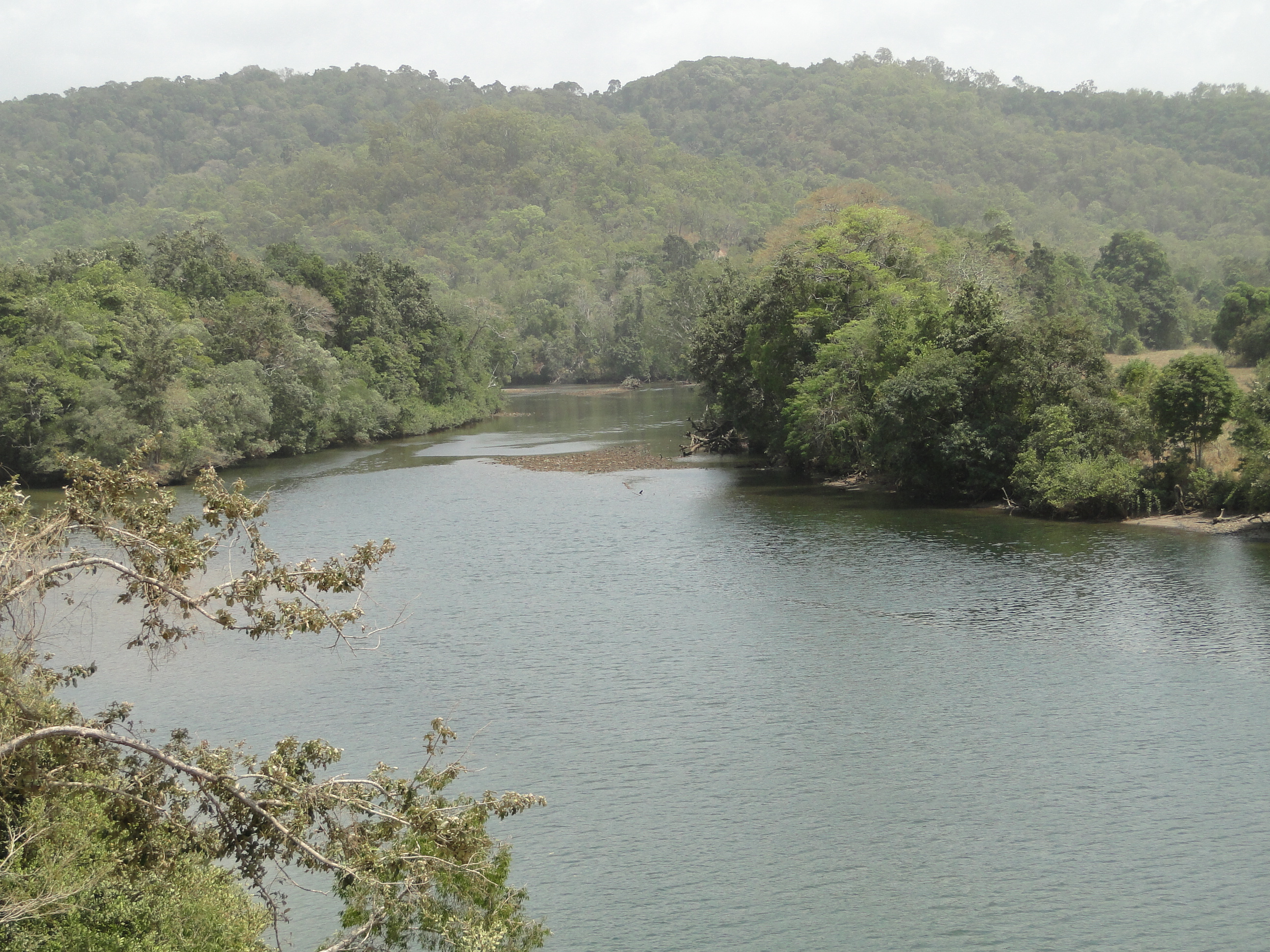
- The Bloomfield River

- Location of Bloomfield River river mouth in Queensland

Location
- Country: Australia
- State: Queensland
- Region: Far North Queensland, Wet Tropics of Queensland

Physical characteristics
- Source: Great Dividing Range
  - location: below Zig Zag
  - coordinates: 15°59′33″S 145°17′12″E
  - elevation: 174 m (571 ft)
- Mouth: Weary Bay, Coral Sea
  - location: near Ayton
  - coordinates: 15°55′07″S 145°22′01″E
  - elevation: 0 m (0 ft)
- Length: 18 km (11 mi)
- Basin size: 418.5 km^{2} (161.6 sq mi)
- Discharge
  - location: Near mouth
  - average: 13.8 m^{3}/s (440 GL/a)

Basin features
- Conservation park: Bloomfield River Regional Park

The Bloomfield River is a river in the Wet Tropics of Far North Queensland, Australia, noted for its Bloomfield River cod fish species, found only in the river.

== Course and features ==
The river rises in the Great Dividing Range below Zig Zag and southeast of Wujal Wujal. The river flows generally east by north before reaching its mouth and emptying into Weary Bay in the Coral Sea near the settlement of Ayton, north of Daintree. The river enters the Coral Sea north of Cape Tribulation. The river estuary is in near pristine conditions.

In 2014 the Australian and Queensland governments completed a A$21 million bridge across the river, called the Bobby and Jacky Ball Bloomfield River Bridge. The bridge was named after two respected Australian Aboriginal elders, brother Bobby and Jacky Ball. The land where the bridge was constructed and south to Degarra is their traditional country. The Ball brothers are the eldest remaining sons of their family. During the construction of the bridge, they visited the site daily. They walked from the Wujal Wujal Aboriginal Shire to Degarra each day to visit a river fishing spot.

== Etymology ==
The river was originally named Blomfield's Rivulet by Phillip Parker King on 26 June 1818.

== Fishery controls and environmental issues ==
It is prohibited to catch the Bloomfield river cod in Queensland.

The controversial Bloomfield Track which connects Cape Tribulation with Cooktown crosses the Bloomfield River. This crossing was closed in February 2011 by the Cairns Regional Council after flooding destroyed the causeway. A passenger-only ferry service was in place until a four-wheel drive only temporary crossing opened in May 2011. Construction of an all weather bridge began in October 2013 and was completed April 2014. A bridge over Woobada creek was completed late 2014. Douglas Shire Council maintains the Bloomfield Track.

== History ==
Kuku Yalanji (also known as Gugu Yalanji, Kuku Yalaja, and Kuku Yelandji) is an Australian Aboriginal language of the Mossman and Daintree areas of North Queensland. The language region includes areas within the local government area of Shire of Douglas and Shire of Cook, particularly the localities of Mossman, Daintree, Bloomfield River, China Camp, Maytown, Palmer, Cape Tribulation and Wujal Wujal.

Yalanji (also known as Kuku Yalanji, Kuku Yalaja, Kuku Yelandji, and Gugu Yalanji) is an Australian Aboriginal language of Far North Queensland. The traditional language region is Mossman River in the south to the Annan River in the north, bordered by the Pacific Ocean in the east and extending inland to west of Mount Mulgrave. This includes the local government boundaries of the Shire of Douglas, the Shire of Cook and the Aboriginal Shire of Wujal Wujal and the towns and localities of Cooktown, Mossman, Daintree, Cape Tribulation and Wujal Wujal. It includes the head of the Palmer River, the Bloomfield River, China Camp, Maytown, and Palmerville.

== See also ==
- List of rivers of Australia § Queensland
