= Wujal Wujal =

- Town
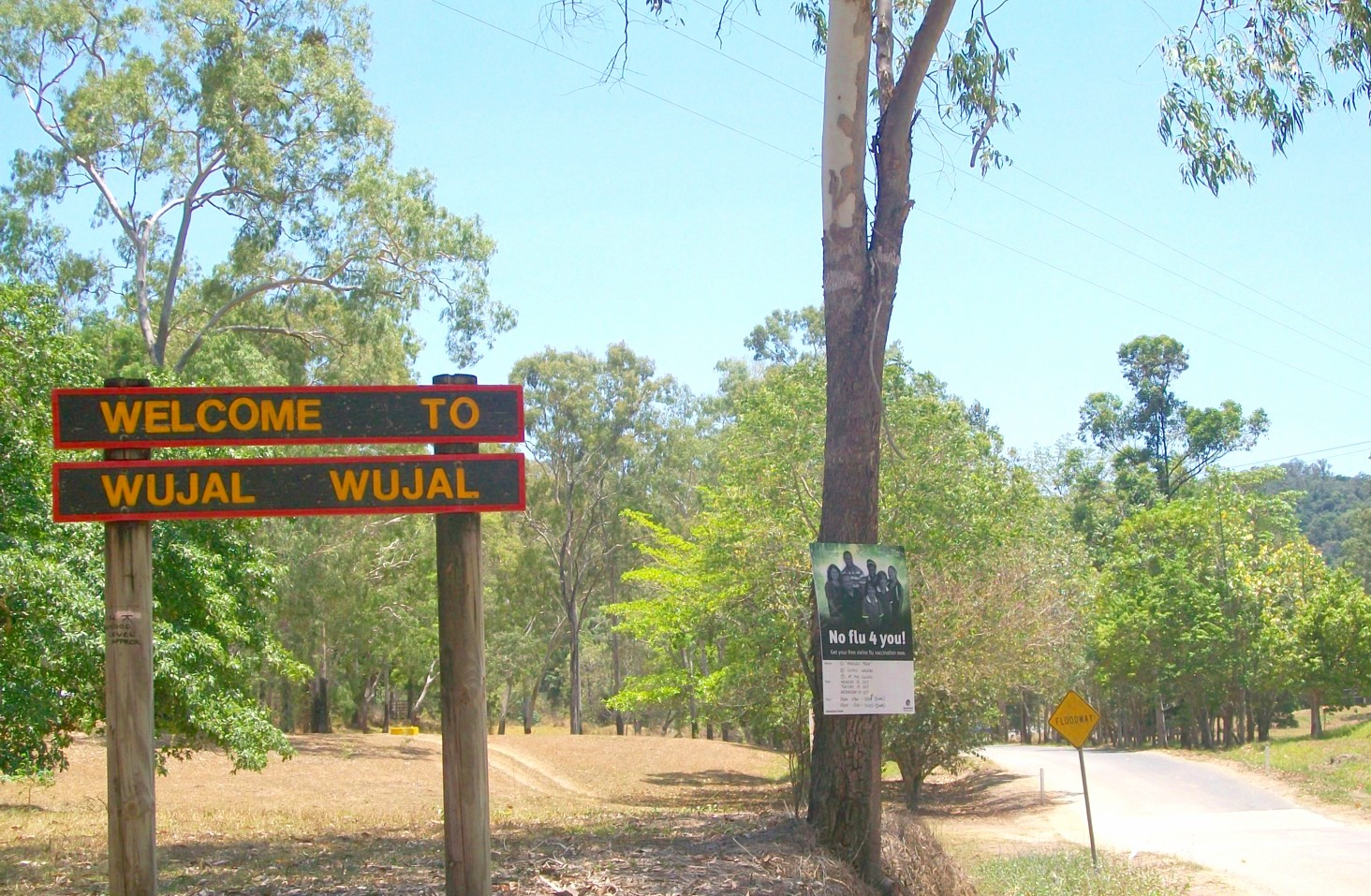
- Sign welcoming people to Wujal Wujal, having travelled from the south along the Bloomfield Track

- Interactive map of Wujal Wujal
- Coordinates: 15.9459°S 145.3186°E
- Country: Australia
- State: Queensland
- LGA: Aboriginal Shire of Wujal Wujal
- Location: 71.3 km (44.3 mi) S of Cooktown; 94.9 km (59.0 mi) N of Mossman; 341 km (212 mi) NNW of Cairns; 2,021 km (1,256 mi) NNW of Brisbane

Government
  - State electorate: Cook
  - Federal division: Leichhardt

Area
  - Total: 11.7 km^{2} (4.5 sq mi)

Population
  - Total: 276 (2021 census)
  - Density: 23.59/km^{2} (61.1/sq mi)
- Time zone: UTC+10:00 (AEST)
- Postcode: 4895
Localities around Wujal Wujal
Bloomfield	Bloomfield	Degarra
Bloomfield	Wujal Wujal	Bloomfield
Bloomfield	Bloomfield	Bloomfield

Wujal Wujal, sometimes spelt Wudjil Wudjil, is a rural town and locality in the Wujal Wujal Aboriginal Shire, Queensland, Australia. It is an Aboriginal community. In the 2021 census, the locality of Wujal Wujal had a population of 276 people.

The community of Wujal Wujal is located in the Cape York region with the surrounding environment and cultural tourism attracting many people to the region. Wujal Wujal is part of the traditional homelands of the Eastern Kuku (Goo-goo) Yalanji (Ya-lan-gee).

The name Wujal Wujal ('many falls') is derived from the local language. There are several Indigenous languages spoken within this community.

== Geography ==
Wujal Wujal is on the north and south sides of the Bloomfield River in northern Queensland, Australia.

It is located approximately 30 kilometres (19 mi) north of Cape Tribulation and 60 kilometres (37 mi) south of Cooktown. Access to the community is via sealed road from Cooktown, or by the Bloomfield Track, an unsealed road from Cape Tribulation which is only suitable for four wheel drive vehicles. This is due to the gradient of the terrain and the many streams and rivers that make up the Daintree drainage basin which cross the path at very regular intervals. During high waterflow the road from Cape Tribulation is impassable.

The rare Bloomfield River Cod (Guyu wujalwujalensis) is found only in the Bloomfield River and is named after this community.

== History ==
Kuku Yalanji (also known as Gugu Yalanji, Kuku Yalaja, and Kuku Yelandji) is an Australian Aboriginal language of the Mossman and Daintree areas of North Queensland. The language region includes areas within the local government area of Shire of Douglas and Shire of Cook, particularly the localities of Mossman, Daintree, Bloomfield River, China Camp, Maytown, Palmer, Cape Tribulation and Wujal Wujal.

Yalanji (also known as Kuku Yalanji, Kuku Yalaja, Kuku Yelandji, and Gugu Yalanji) is an Australian Aboriginal language of Far North Queensland. The traditional language region is Mossman River in the south to the Annan River in the north, bordered by the Pacific Ocean in the east and extending inland to west of Mount Mulgrave. This includes the local government boundaries of the Shire of Douglas, the Shire of Cook and the Aboriginal Shire of Wujal Wujal and the towns and localities of Cooktown, Mossman, Daintree, Cape Tribulation and Wujal Wujal. It includes the head of the Palmer River, the Bloomfield River, China Camp, Maytown, and Palmerville.

=== European contact ===
The Bloomfield River mission was established on land belonging to the Kuku-Yalanji people. The first recorded Europeans to visit the Bloomfield River were Royal Navy Lieutenant Commander Frederick Bedwell and Captain Phillip Parker King on board HMS Mermaid on a hydrological survey of the east coast of Australia. In June 1819, HMS Mermaid anchored in Weary Bay and:

"Mr. Bedwell was sent to examine the opening, which was called Blomfield's Rivulet …Near the entrance upon the bank of the inlet several huts were noticed, and near them Mr. Bedwell found a canoe; which, being hollowed out of the trunk of a tree, was of very different construction to any we had before seen; its length was twenty-one feet … an outrigger, projecting about two feet, was neatly attached to one side, which prevented its liability to overset, and at each end was a projection, from fifteen to twenty inches long, on which the natives carry their fire or sit"

The next Europeans to visit Bloomfield River were William Hann and his party. In 1872, William Hann was commissioned by the Queensland Government to explore Cape York Peninsula to assess its mineral and land resources. On their return, the party reached the coast at Weary Bay and then followed the Bloomfield River upstream. Hann was responsible for discovering and naming the Palmer, Tate and Daintree rivers.

One of Hann’s party discovered gold on the Palmer River. After hearing of the discovery, James Venture Mulligan led an expedition to the Palmer River in 1873. Mulligan reported that the sandbars of the river glittered with gold, which started a huge gold rush to the district. By late 1873, the first government officials and prospectors came ashore at the Endeavour River accompanied by a detachment of Native Police.

In 1874, Cooktown was established. Within four months, Cooktown and the Palmer River goldfield had a population of about 3,000 people, many of whom were Chinese immigrants. By 1880, the population of Cooktown had grown to about 7,000.

Conflict between the Europeans and local Aboriginal people began almost immediately. In October 1873, 93 miners (led by goldfields commissioner Howard St George and engineer A C MacMillan) set out from the Endeavour River to blaze a track to the Palmer River.

There were several skirmishes along the way, culminating in a pitched battle between about 150 Aboriginal warriors and the expedition members at their camp near the Normanby River. The site of this encounter was subsequently named "Battle Camp". A contemporary newspaper published the following account of the battle from one of the expedition members:

"Blacks surprised us at daybreak, about 150, all were armed; got close to the camp before anyone heard them; great consternation; shot several; they ran into large waterholes for shelter, where they were shot"

In 1874, the Native Police were sent to explore the country inland from Trinity Bay and Weary Bay to find another road to the Palmer River. They followed the Bloomfield River upstream, but were unable to penetrate the thick scrub. The Native Police officer reported that they had found the Aborigines "exceedingly daring, constantly appearing in most threatening attitudes" and "had to disperse them on three or four occasions".

In 1875, a prospecting party on the Bloomfield River was attacked and driven back to Cooktown by Aboriginal people. The Native Police also established a camp at Laura in 1875. A further detachment under the command of Sub-Inspector O’Connor arrived in January 1876. The first pastoralists in the Bloomfield River district were George Hislop and Frederick Bauer. Bauer established the Bloomfield River Sugar Company on the north side of the river with imported Malay labour. The town of Ayton was established around the sugar mill. The Kuku Yalanji people continued to resist the invasion of their lands by the miners, pastoralists and timber getters. Frontier violence in the region was a frequent occurrence during the 1870s, resulting in hundreds of casualties.

During the 1880s there was a gradual change in north Queensland in the government policy of taking the country by lethal force. Instead, Aboriginal people were removed off their country on to missions, where they would not trouble the settlers and provided a cheap source of labour. This policy change resulted in a decision to establish two Aboriginal reserves in the Cooktown district; one at Cape Bedford and one at Bloomfield River.

In 1885, Lutheran missionary Johann Flierl was travelling to New Guinea to establish a mission, when he was unexpectedly delayed in Cooktown. While there, he negotiated with the Queensland Government to establish a mission close to Cooktown at Cape Bedford on land which had been gazetted as an Aboriginal reserve in 1881. At the same time, he also negotiated the establishment of a mission at the Bloomfield River, on a 640-acre site reserved for the Aborigines in August 1886 by the Queensland Government, just east of the Bloomfield Falls. In addition to the 640 acres gazetted in 1886, 50 square miles of land was reserved as a hunting ground for Aboriginal people in March 1889.

Frederick Bauer was appointed the interim superintendent of the mission in 1886. In 1887, he was replaced by the Lutheran missionary Carl H Meyer, who had previously been at the Cape Bedford Mission. Meyer was dismissed in 1890 and replaced by Sebastian Hoerlein who arrived in 1891. Another missionary, Johann Bogner, arrived in 1892 and worked with Hoerlein until he and his wife left in 1895, due to her ill health.

From inception, the mission struggled to become firmly established. In 1887, the police magistrate from Cooktown visited the mission and reported that about 80 people were living there, consisting of mostly aged men, women and children. The average population of the mission from 1887 to 1900 was only 55. The population varied over time, as Aboriginal people would come and go from the mission as they pleased.

This feature of the mission has been explained by Christopher Anderson, who found that the mission was mostly used by the Wujalwujalwarra "mob" of the Bloomfield River area, on whose land the mission stood. They incorporated the resources available at the mission into their social and economic life. The mission provided a reliable source of food and tobacco, and material items, such as farm tools and blankets. The mission was also used as a "caring centre" where they could leave the elderly, ill and young.

Over time, the Kuku-Yalanji found other sites of more use. The mission superintendent Carl Meyer lamented that "it is painful and disappointing to be continually revealing the gospel message and find it meeting deaf ears everywhere".

In 1901, the Evangelical Lutheran Immanuel Synod made the decision to withdraw from the mission. In 1902, Northern Protector Walter Roth closed the mission. The reserve status of the land was revoked. The Aboriginal people who had been on the mission stayed in the area in a number of small camps.

In 1945, the Cooktown Protector of Aboriginals reported that there was a camp on the south side of the river, a camp on the north side of the river, and another one upstream. He reported that the people camped there seemed to be fairly well off, having an abundant supply of food. However, he raised concerns about the large number of children living there and not attending school.

In 1957, a newspaper article was published which reported that some of the white residents of the Bloomfield River area had complained to the Cook Shire Council about the cleanliness of the camps at the Bloomfield River. This complaint followed a test of the Bloomfield River State School children for hookworm, which found that some of the students were infected. Thirty of the 51 students at the school were Aboriginal. The council then demanded that the Department of Native Affairs take urgent action to clean up the camps. The department approached the Lutheran Church to re-establish the mission at Bloomfield River and provided them with a £2500 grant to fund housing, transportation and communications.

An area of 260 acres (which included part of the old reserve) was gazetted as an Aboriginal reserve in May 1958. In the 1960s, the mission comprised 3 main villages; Bottom Camp, Thompson’s Creek Camp and the Outpost, and a separate area where the superintendent lived. During the 1960s, a girls' hostel was built at the back of the superintendent’s house with the assistance of Aboriginal carpenters from the Hope Vale Mission.

In 1964, land about 6 kilometres (3.7 mi) upstream from the mission, where the old mission had been, was proclaimed an Aboriginal reserve. The land was cleared for growing crops. A manager’s house, a boy’s dormitory, a mess hut and saw bench were constructed on this site. Subsequently, all the camps were consolidated into this one.

In December 2023, the region was hit by the 2023 Cairns floods. 270 Wujal Wujal residents were evacuated by Chinook helicopters to Cooktown after the town was hit by flooding. A majority of homes in the town went underwater after the Bloomfield River broke it banks.

=== Local government and Deed of Grant in Trust community ===
On 16 February 1980, the Bloomfield River mission was officially renamed Wujal Wujal. On 29 October 1987, the Aboriginal reserve held by the Queensland Government was transferred to the trusteeship of the council under a Deed of Grant in Trust.

On 1 January 2005, under the Local Government (Community Government Areas) Act 2004, Wujal Wujal Aboriginal Council became the Wujal Wujal Aboriginal Shire Council.

== Demographics ==
In the 2006 census, the town of Wujal Wujal had a population of 326 people.

In the 2016 census, the locality of Wujal Wujal had a population of 282 people.

In the 2021 census, the locality of Wujal Wujal had a population of 276 people.

== Community ==
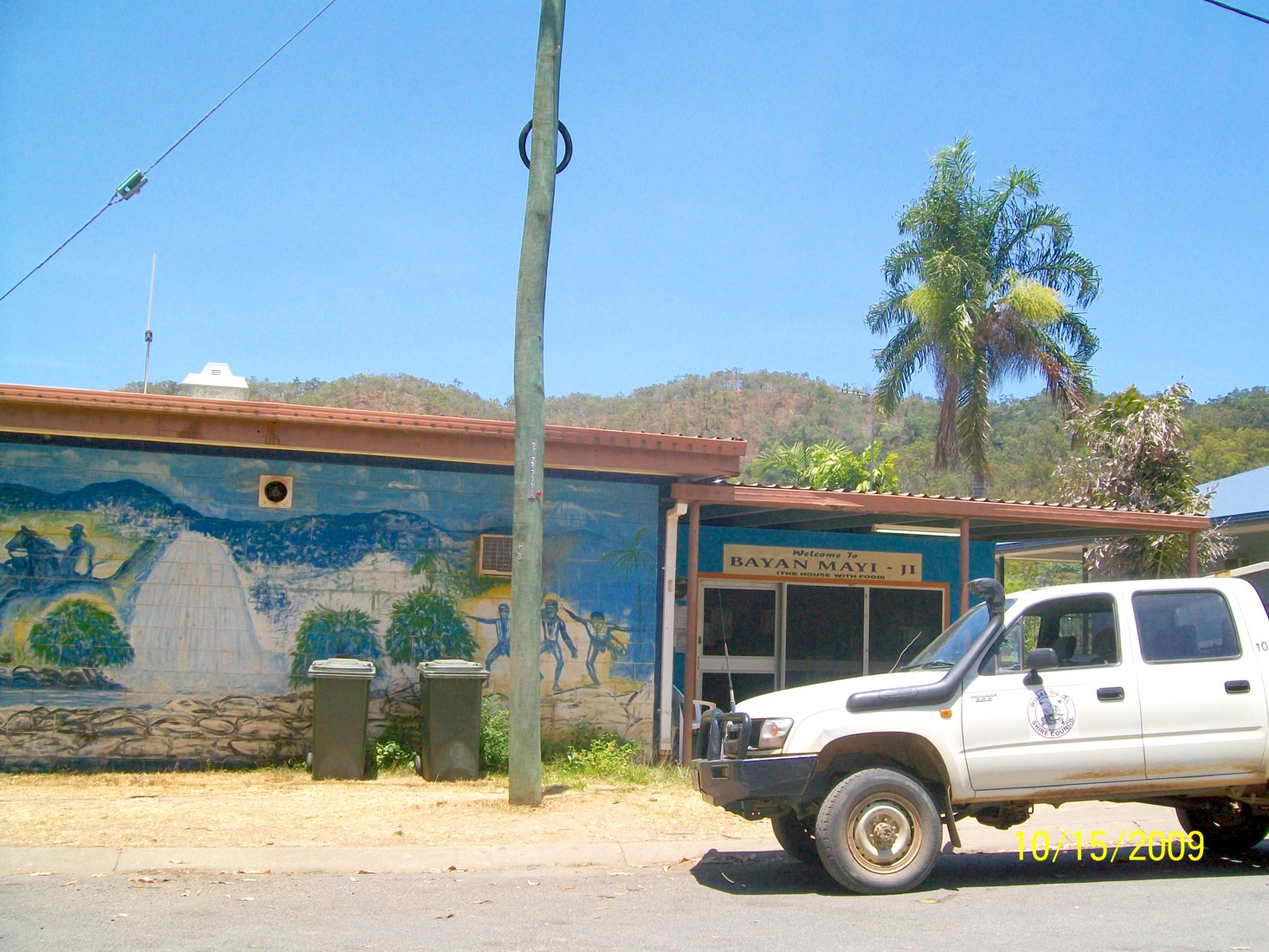
Wujal Wujal's one general store, in Wujal Wujal's main street, with mural including Wujal Wujal falls, and Wujal Wujal Council vehicle parked out front, October 2009

Wujal Wujal was formerly known as the Bloomfield River Mission and the people are Kuku Yalanji.

The community has a helicopter landing pad just beside the hospital. Emergency medical services are provided by the Primary Health Care Centre (Remote Area Nurses, Health Workers, and two or three visits per week from doctors based at the Cooktown Hospital.

In 1980, the Aboriginal Council came into being, with the area regaining its traditional name, Wujal Wujal. The community has an Indigenous Knowledge Centre, Binal Mangka Bayan, which means "house of knowing things". The centre provides access to books, magazines and other educational material, as well as running programs for children, adults and seniors. Paid internet access is available.

== Education ==
There are no schools in Wujal Wujal. The nearest government primary school is Bloomfield River State School in neighbouring Bloomfield to the north. There are no secondary schools serving the area; the alternatives are distance education and boarding school.

== Attractions ==
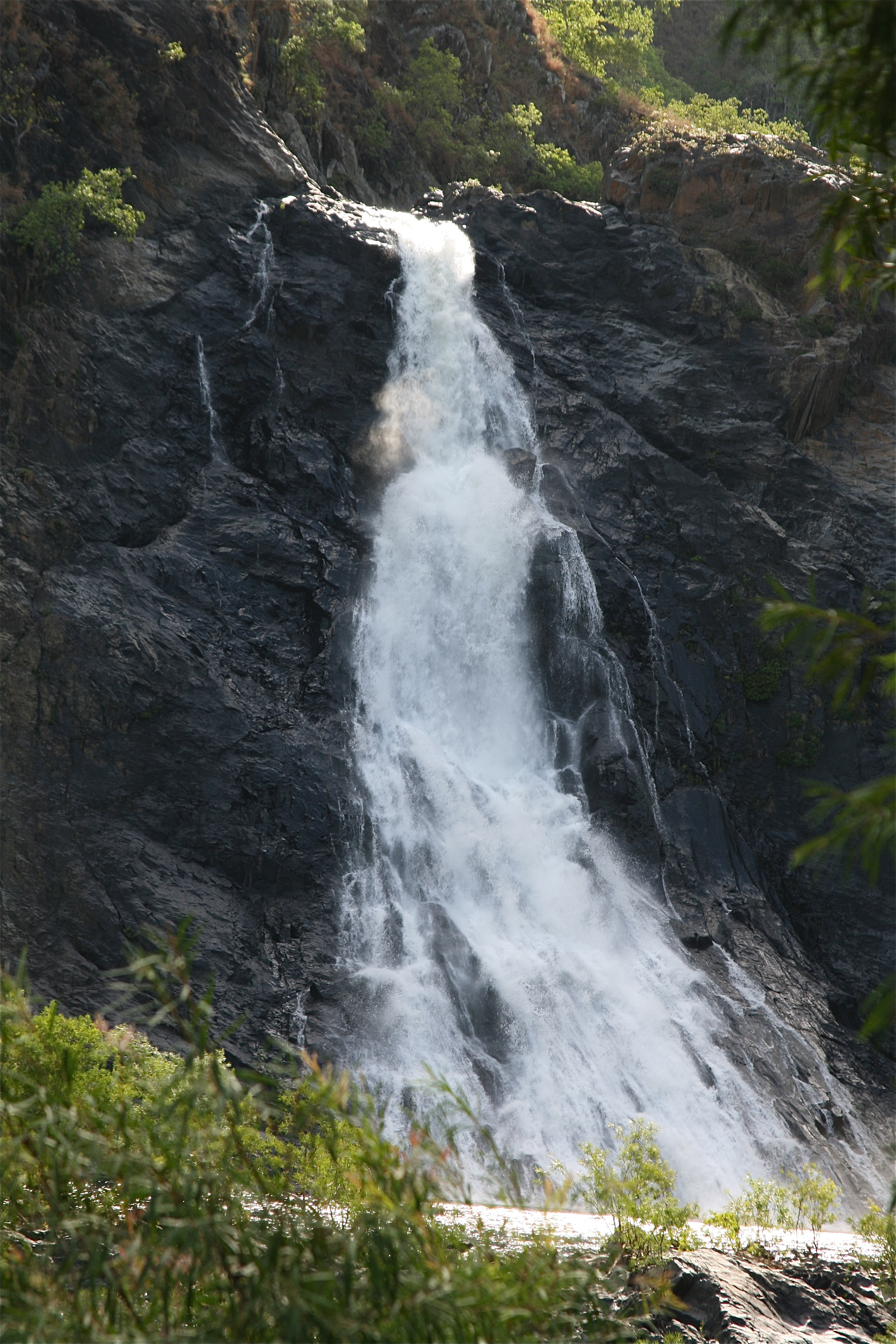
Wujal-Wujal Falls are seen here at a time of relatively low water

The waterfalls are very sacred to the community.

== See also ==
- List of reduplicated Australian place names
