= Cape Tribulation, Queensland =

Cape Tribulation Kulki (Kuku-Yalanji)
- Suburb
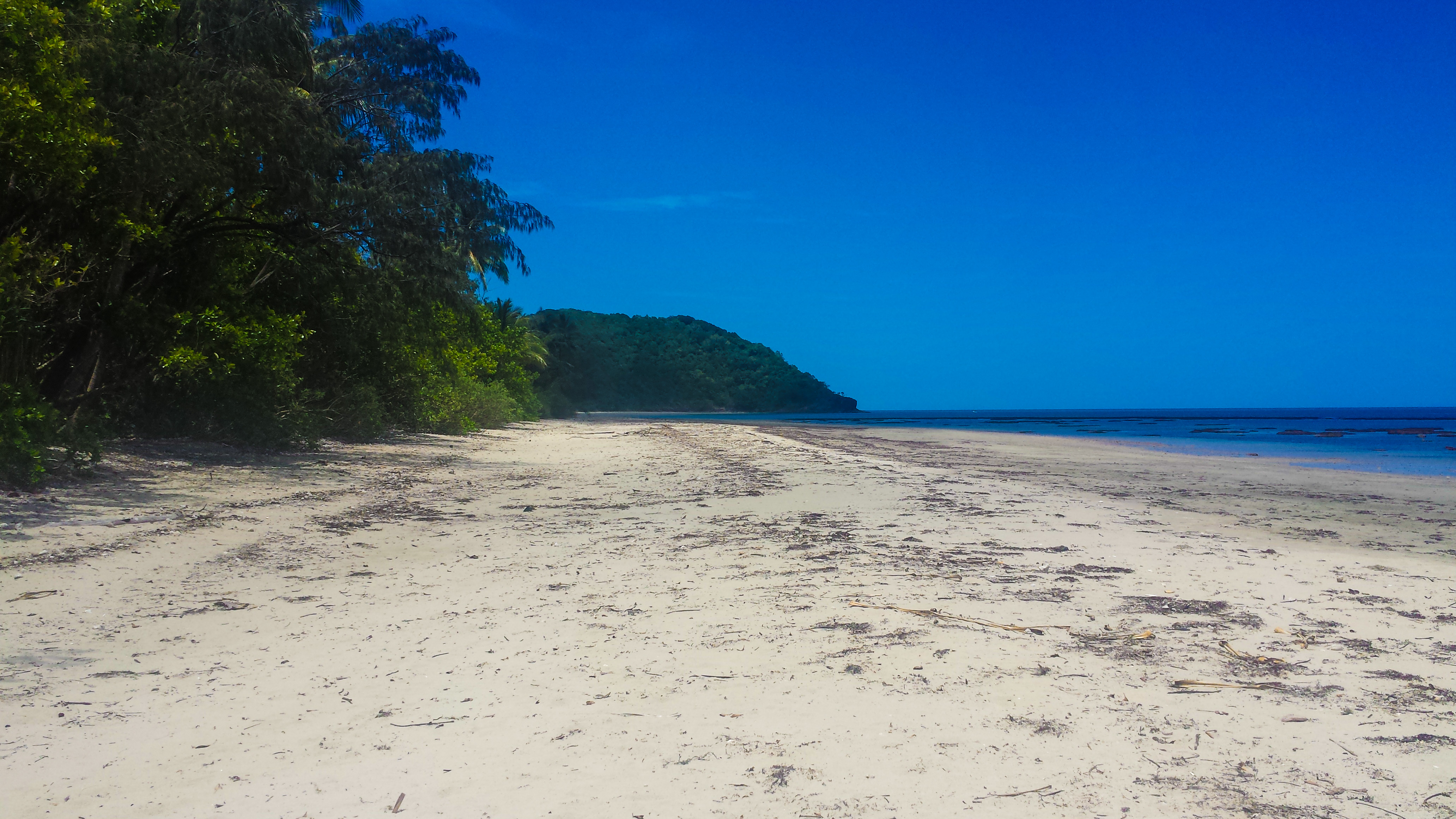
- Cape Tribulation

- Interactive map of Cape Tribulation
- Coordinates: 16.0347°S 145.4191°E
- Country: Australia
- State: Queensland
- LGA: Shire of Douglas
- Location: 64.2 km (39.9 mi) NNE of Mossman; 102 km (63 mi) S of Cooktown; 140 km (87 mi) N of Cairns; 1,847 km (1,148 mi) NNE of Brisbane
- Established: 1930s

Government
  - State electorate: Cook
  - Federal division: Leichhardt

Area
  - Total: 125.6 km^{2} (48.5 sq mi)

Population
  - Total: 123 (2021 census)
  - Density: 0.979/km^{2} (2.536/sq mi)
- Time zone: UTC+10:00 (AEST)
- Postcode: 4873
Suburbs around Cape Tribulation
Degarra	Bloomfield	Coral Sea
Bloomfield	Cape Tribulation	Coral Sea
Noah	Thornton Beach	Coral Sea

Cape Tribulation (Kuku-Yalanji: Kulki) is a headland and coastal locality in the Shire of Douglas in northern Queensland, Australia. In the 2021 census, Cape Tribulation had a population of 123 people.

== Geography ==
The locality is 110 km (68 mi) north of Cairns. It is within the Daintree National Park and the Wet Tropics World Heritage area. It is within the local government area of Shire of Douglas (between 2008 and 2013, it was within the Cairns Region).

Cape Tribulation Bloomfield Road enters the locality from the south (Thornton Beach) and exits to the north (Bloomfield).

The locality contains a small number of bed and breakfast eco lodges, tourism resorts and backpacker hostels. A few very rare plants can be found on Cape Tribulation.

== History ==
Kuku Yalanji (also known as Gugu Yalanji, Kuku Yalaja, and Kuku Yelandji) is an Australian Aboriginal language of the Mossman and Daintree areas of North Queensland. The language region includes areas within the local government area of Shire of Douglas and Shire of Cook, particularly the localities of Mossman, Daintree, Bloomfield River, China Camp, Maytown, Palmer, Cape Tribulation and Wujal Wujal.

Yalanji (also known as Kuku Yalanji, Kuku Yalaja, Kuku Yelandji, and Gugu Yalanji) is an Australian Aboriginal language of Far North Queensland. The traditional language region is Mossman River in the south to the Annan River in the north, bordered by the Pacific Ocean in the east and extending inland to west of Mount Mulgrave. This includes the local government boundaries of the Shire of Douglas, the Shire of Cook and the Aboriginal Shire of Wujal Wujal and the towns and localities of Cooktown, Mossman, Daintree, Cape Tribulation and Wujal Wujal. It includes the head of the Palmer River, the Bloomfield River, China Camp, Maytown, and Palmerville.

Cape Tribulation was named by British navigator Lieutenant James Cook on 10 June 1770 (log date) after his ship scraped a reef north-east of the cape at 6pm, whilst passing over it. Cook steered away from the coast into deeper water but, at 10.30pm, the ship ran aground on what is now named Endeavour Reef. The ship stuck fast and was badly damaged, desperate measures being needed to prevent it foundering until it was refloated the next day. Cook recorded "...the north point [was named] Cape Tribulation because "here begun all our troubles".

In the 1930s, some European settlers arrived in Cape Tribulation, but they found the rainforest environment an extremely challenging one within which to establish a settlement. Various ventures such as fruit and vegetable farming, fishing, cattle and timber cutting, were started and abandoned over the years, and having weekly barges as the only transport in and out was another limitation. In the 1960s, a rough track was bulldozed and the first vehicle access created, although the road remained a four-wheel drive track until the early 1990s. In 2002, the road was finally sealed all the way to Cape Tribulation and, in early 2011, the last bridge was built, creating year round all weather access to Cape Tribulation for the first time.

In 1983, Cape Tribulation became widely known because of the blockade on the Bloomfield Track. The local government had decided to bulldoze a road through the rainforest north of Cape Tribulation to complete the coastal road to Cooktown. Protesters tried to stop the bulldozers and occupied trees to prevent their destruction. While wild scenes, with a large police and media presence, ensued at the southern end, the road was completed in three short weeks because the road builders approached from northern end and flanked the protestors. By then, the state and federal governments had started to realise the value of the ancient rainforest and, despite protests from the local council, the forests surrounding Cape Tribulation were given World Heritage Listing in 1988.

== Demographics ==
In the 2016 census, Cape Tribulation had a population of 118 people.

In the 2021 census, Cape Tribulation had a population of 123 people.

== Education ==
There are no schools in Cape Tribulation. The nearest government primary schools are Bloomfield River State School in neighbouring Bloomfield to the north and Alexandra Bay State School in Diwan to the south. There are no government secondary schools nearby; the alternatives are distance education and boarding school.

== Climate ==
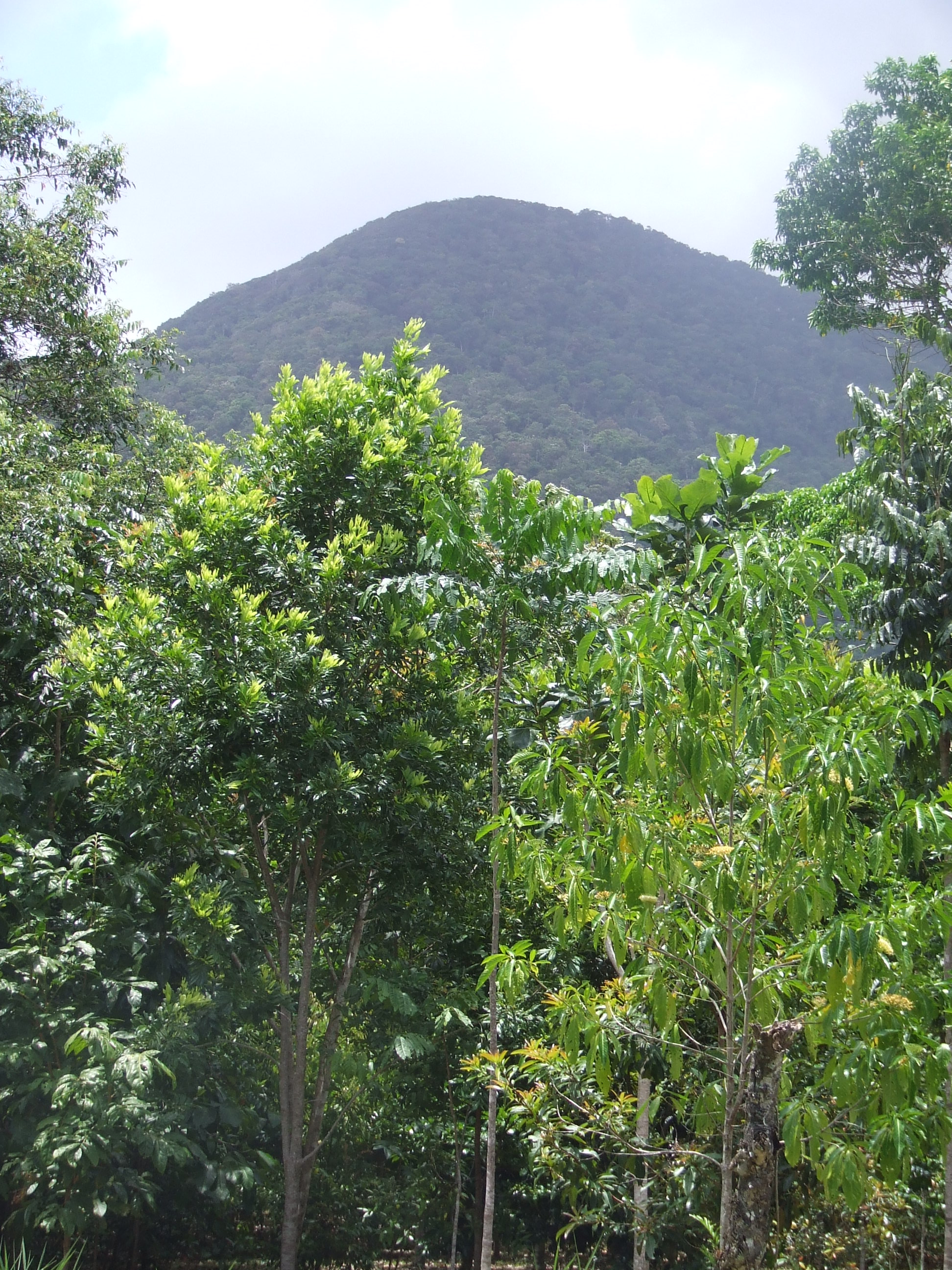
Mount Sorrow, viewed from the main highway.

The average annual rainfall for Cape Tribulation is 3,900 millimetres (150 in).

== Attractions ==
There are a number of lookouts in the locality, including:

- Mount Sorrow Ridge Trail Lookout (16.0766°S 145.4403°E)
- Kulki Boardwalk Lookout (16.0766°S 145.4722°E)
- Marrja Boardwalk Lookout (16.1406°S 145.4373°E)

== See also ==
- Tourism in Australia
