= Far North Queensland =

- Region
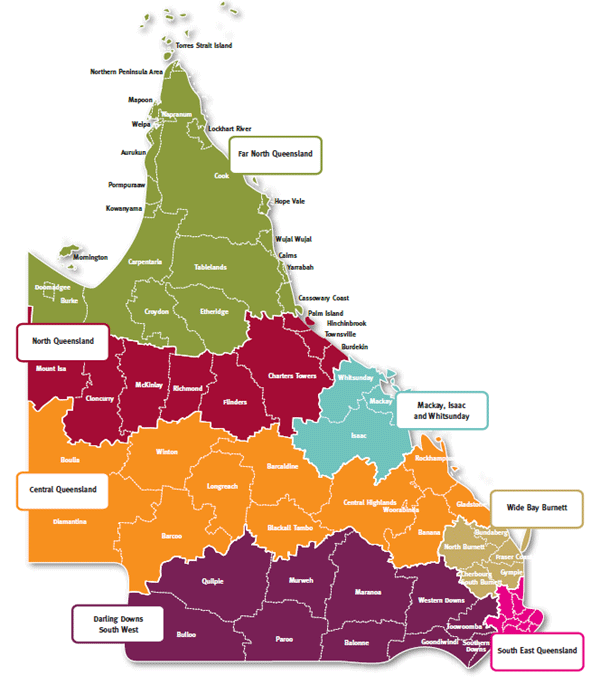
- Queensland regions
- Country: Australia
- State: Queensland
- LGA: Aurukun, Burke, Cairns, Carpentaria, Cassowary Coast, Cook, Croydon, Doomadgee, Douglas, Etheridge, Hope Vale, Kowanyama, Lockhart River, Mapoon, Mareeba, Mornington, Napranum, Northern Peninsula Area, Pormpuraaw, Tablelands, Torres, Torres Strait Island, Weipa, Wujal Wujal, Yarrabah

Government
  - State electorate: Electoral district of Barron River, Electoral district of Cairns, Electoral district of Cook, Electoral district of Dalrymple, Electoral district of Hinchinbrook, Electoral district of Mulgrave
  - Federal divisions: Kennedy; Leichhardt

Area
  - Total: 272,215 km^{2} (105,103 sq mi)

Population
  - Total: 303,102 (2024)
  - Density: 1.11/km^{2} (2.9/sq mi)
Regions around Far North Queensland
Gulf of Carpentaria	Torres Strait	Coral Sea
North West Queensland	Far North Queensland	Coral Sea
North West Queensland	North Queensland	North Queensland

Far North Queensland (FNQ) is the northernmost part of the Australian state of Queensland (QLD). Its largest city is Cairns and it is dominated geographically by Cape York Peninsula, which stretches north to the Torres Strait, and west to the Gulf Country. The waters of Torres Strait include the only international border in the area contiguous with the Australian mainland, between Australia and Papua New Guinea.

The region is home to three World Heritage Sites, the Great Barrier Reef, the Wet Tropics of Queensland and Riversleigh, Australia's largest fossil mammal site. Far North Queensland lays claim to over 70 national parks, including Mount Bartle Frere; with a peak of 1,622 metres (5,322 ft) it is the highest peak in both Northern Australia and Queensland.

Prior to European settlement, the Far North of Queensland was inhabited by numerous Aboriginal peoples, and today many local Indigenous languages and cultural practices have survived and are still maintained. New Native Title determinations for this area continue to be awarded. The Far North is the only region of Australia that is the indigenous country of both Aboriginal Australians and Torres Strait Islanders.

Far North Queensland supports a significant agricultural sector, a number of significant mines and is home to Queensland's largest wind farm, the Windy Hill Wind Farm.

== Extent ==
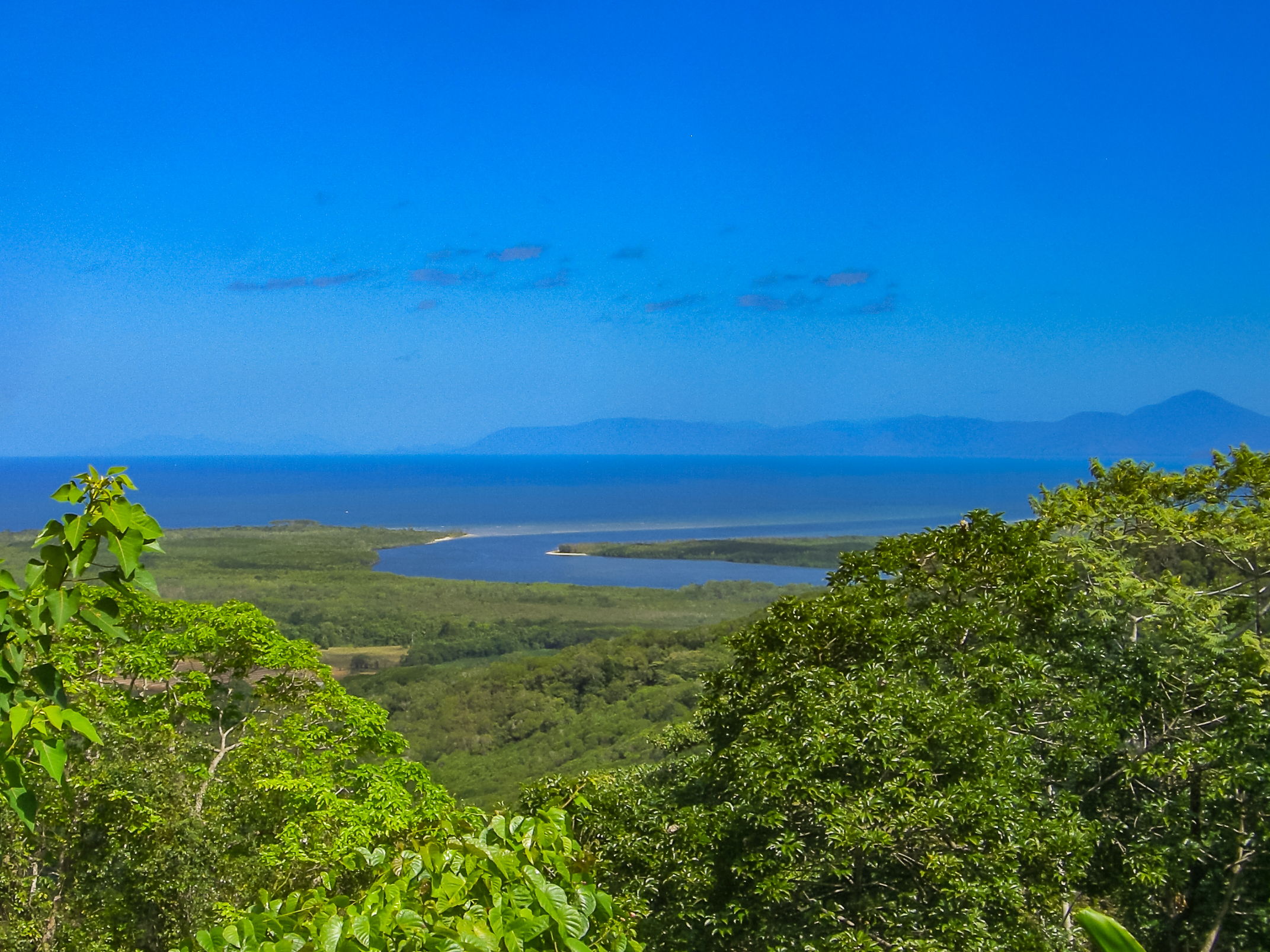
View from Daintree National Park, 2009

Various government departments and agencies have different definitions for the region. The Queensland Government department of Trade and Investment Queensland defines the region as an area comprising the following 25 local government areas; Aurukun, Burke, Cairns, Carpentaria, Cassowary Coast, Cook, Croydon, Doomadgee, Douglas, Etheridge, Hope Vale, Kowanyama, Lockhart River, Mapoon, Mareeba, Mornington, Napranum, Northern Peninsula Area, Pormpuraaw, Tablelands, Torres Strait Islands (not autonomous), Torres Strait Islands (autonomous), Weipa, Wujal Wujal, and Yarrabah.

== Settlements ==
The main population and administrative centre of the region is the city of Cairns. Other key population centres include Cooktown, the Atherton Tableland, Weipa, Innisfail and the Torres Strait Islands. The region also consists of many Aboriginal and farming groups.

The northeastern point of Highway 1 passes through the region in the city of Cairns and connects the southern-running Bruce Highway to the western-running Savannah Way. Highway 1 circumnavigates the continent at a length of approximately 14,500 kilometres (9,000 mi) and is the longest national highway in the world. Despite being Highway 1, not all sections of the Savannah Way are designated as a federally funded National Highway and certain sections remain unsealed.

Despite being in a housing crisis, the region has a very high unoccupied house rate. In the 2021 Australian census in Douglas Shire the rate of empty homes was 18%.

== Industry ==
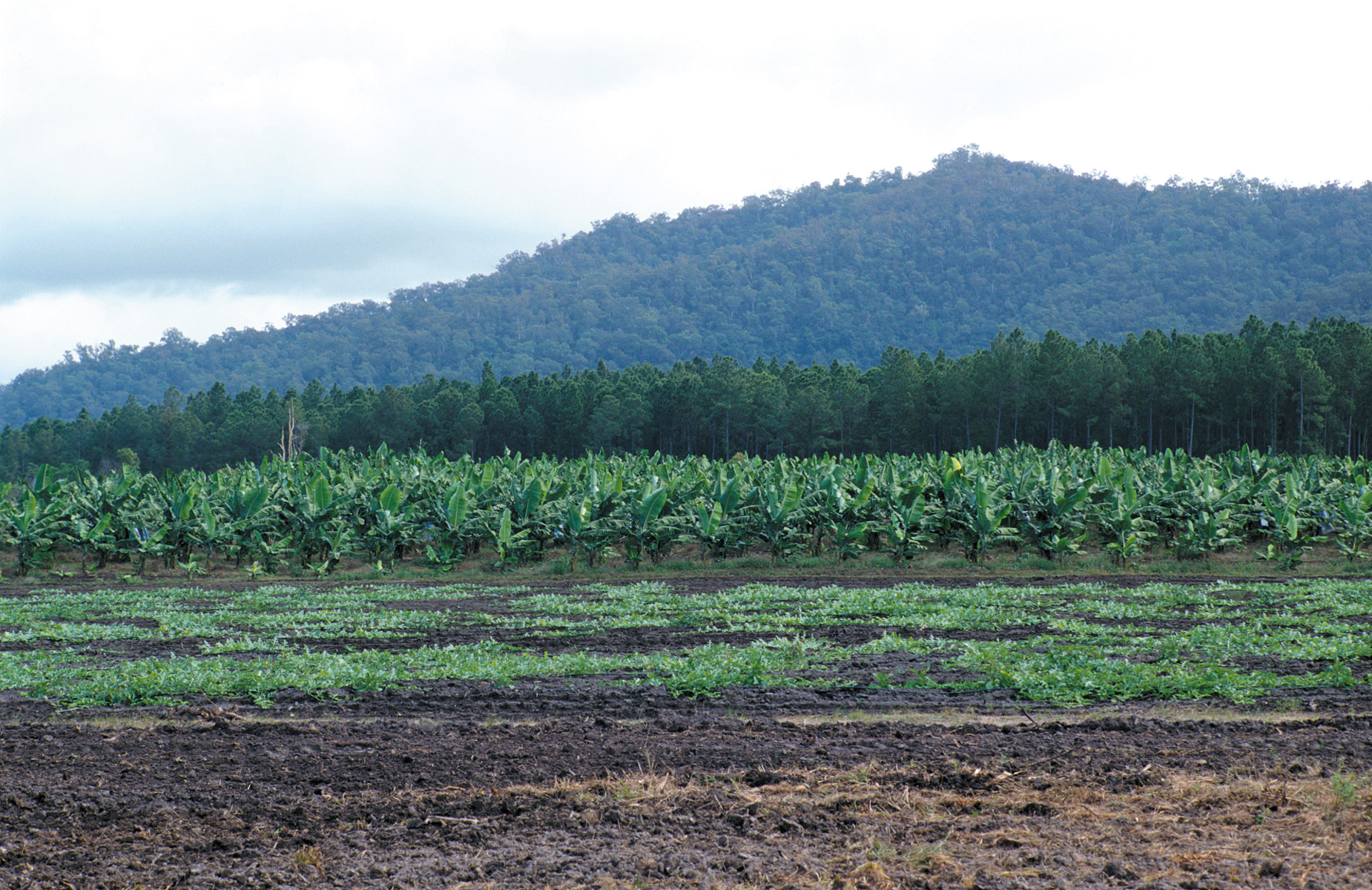
Crops near Cardwell, Far North Queensland

Significant industries include tourism, cattle grazing, agriculture and mining of both sand and bauxite. Agricultural products generate between $600 and $700 million a year. Sugar cane, tropical fruits including bananas, mangoes, papaya, lychees and coffee are grown in Far North Queensland.

The region is home to the world's biggest silica mine at Cape Flattery. The mine was established in 1967 and was severely damaged by Cyclone Ita in 2014. Rio Tinto Alcan operates a bauxite mine on the western coast of Cape York Peninsula near Weipa which contains one of the largest bauxite deposits in the world.

In recent years, Far North Queensland has become increasingly known for its artistic and creative offerings, with the Cairns Indigenous Art Fair, and Cairns Festival both held annually. Active arts organisation include the Tanks Arts Centre, Cairns Civic Theatre, and Cairns Art Gallery.

=== Tourism ===
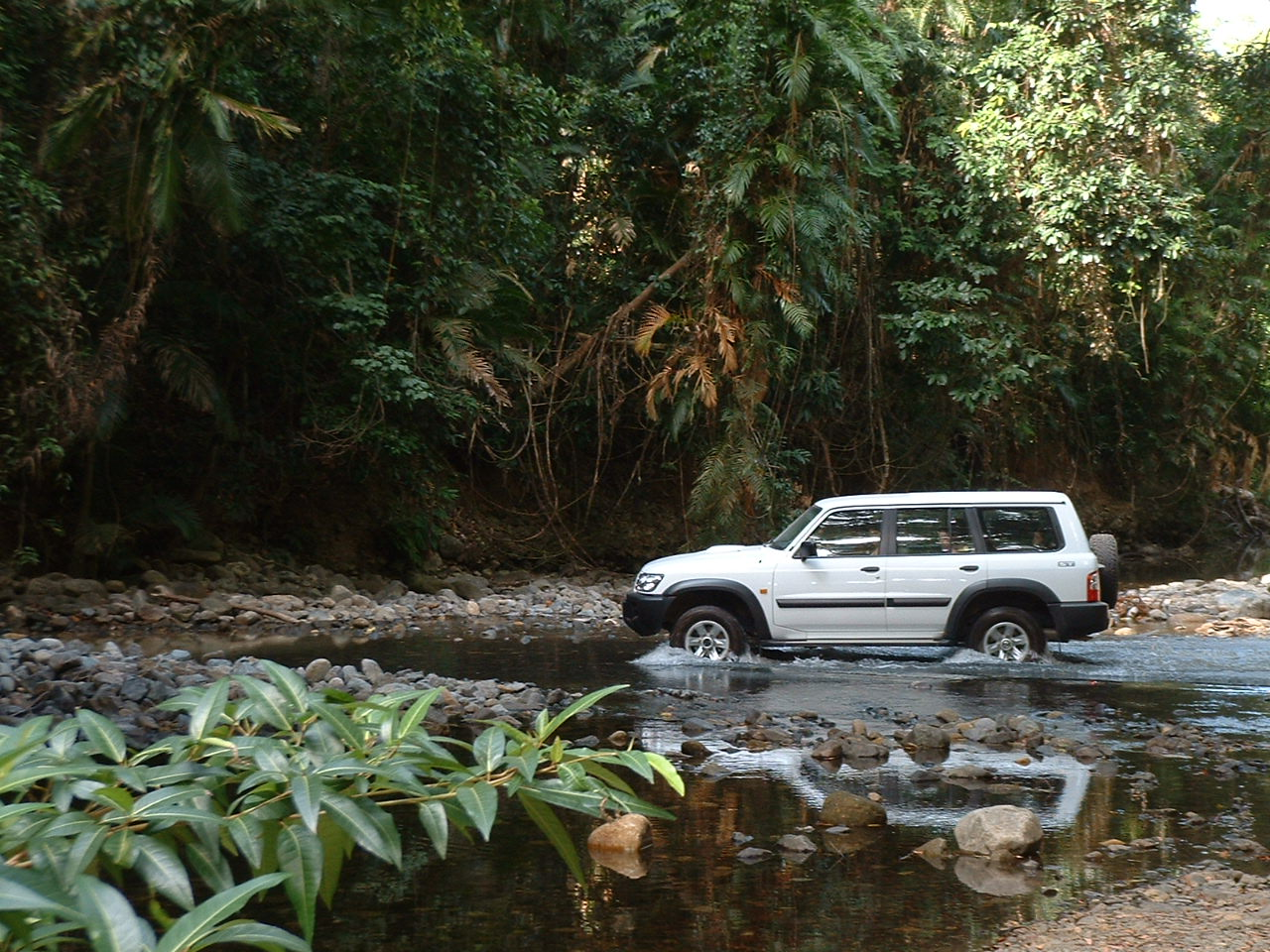
Bloomfield Track in the Daintree Rainforest

The region supports a large tourism industry and is considered a premier tourist destination in Australia. Nearly one third of international visitors to the state come to the region. Attractions include the Great Barrier Reef, Daintree Rainforest and other Queensland tropical rain forests within the Wet Tropics of Queensland heritage area, the Atherton Tableland, Hinchinbrook Island and other resort islands such as Dunk Island and Green Island. Major attractions around and in Cairns include Cairns Aquarium, Cairns Botanic Gardens, The Reef Hotel Casino, Kuranda Scenic Railway, Barron Falls and the Skyrail Rainforest Cableway. Towns and localities attracting large numbers of tourists include Cape Tribulation, Port Douglas, Mission Beach and Cardwell.

=== Airports ===
The region is served by Cairns Airport. The airport is the main international gateway to the region with direct services t. to other parts of Australia, Asia, Oceania and New Zealand.

== Demographics ==
Far North Queensland's population has grown rapidly. The Australian Bureau of Statistics estimated the region's population at 280,638 in 2010. In 2024, Far North Queensland is home to 303,102 residents, expected to increase to 378,000 residents by 2041.

In 2010 the region contained 25.6% of the state's Indigenous population, or 28,909 people, making up 11.8% of the region's population. This percentage seemingly declined by the 2021 census, although this reflects changes to the areas included in the calculation. ABS' 2021 census estimated FNQ's Indigenous population at 16,534, or 4.6% of Queensland's total number of people identifying as Indigenous. This apparent decline overlooks (a) the dramatic increase in numbers of non-Indigenous residents in the region, and (b) the high percentages of Indigenous people that remain in areas now designated the 'Outback North', and several other 'Tablelands', urban and coastal classification areas, that used to fall under the FNQ umbrella.

In addition to its large Indigenous community, there is also a large number of Melanesians in Far North Queensland, due to the region's close proximity to Melanesia. The majority of them are from Papua New Guinea or are South Sea Islanders, who descend from labourers who were blackbirded and brought to Queensland from Fiji, the Solomon Islands and Vanuatu. Cairns has the highest population of Papua New Guineans outside of Papua New Guinea itself.

== History ==
=== Aboriginal peoples ===
Yalanji (also known as Kuku Yalanji, Kuku Yalaja, Kuku Yelandji, and Gugu Yalanji) is an Australian Aboriginal language of Far North Queensland. The traditional language region is Mossman River in the south to the Annan River in the north, bordered by the Pacific Ocean in the east and extending inland to west of Mount Mulgrave. This includes the local government boundaries of the Shire of Douglas, the Shire of Cook and the Aboriginal Shire of Wujal Wujal and the towns and localities of Cooktown, Mossman, Daintree, Cape Tribulation and Wujal Wujal. It includes the head of the Palmer River, the Bloomfield River, China Camp, Maytown, and Palmerville.

Kuku Yalanji (also known as Gugu Yalanji, Kuku Yalaja, and Kuku Yelandji) is an Australian Aboriginal language of the Mossman and Daintree areas of North Queensland. The language region includes areas within the local government area of Shire of Douglas and Shire of Cook, particularly the localities of Mossman, Daintree, Bloomfield River, China Camp, Maytown, Palmer, Cape Tribulation and Wujal Wujal.

Warungu (also known as Warrungu, Warrongo, and Waroongoo.) is an Australian Aboriginal language in North Queensland. The language region includes areas from the Upper Herbert River to Mount Garnet.

Yir Yiront (also known as Yiront, Jirjoront, Yir-yiront, and Kokomindjan) is an Australian Aboriginal language. Its traditional language region is in Western Cape York within the local government areas of Aboriginal Shire of Kowanyama and Shire of Cook, in the catchments of the Coleman River and Mitchell River. Following the removal of Aboriginal people from their traditional lands, it is also spoken in Pormpuraaw and Kowanyama.

Yidinji (also known as Yidinj, Yidiny, and Idindji) is an Australian Aboriginal language of North Queensland. Its traditional language region is within the local government areas of Cairns Region and Tablelands Region, in such localities as Cairns, Gordonvale, the southern part of the Atherton Tableland including Atherton and Kairi.

=== Mining ===
Far North Queensland is the location of the first amber fossils to be found in Australia. The four-million-year-old fossils were found on a beach in Cape York Peninsula but were probably washed ashore after drifting with the currents for about 200 km. In the 1860s, Richard Daintree discovered gold and copper deposits along several rivers which led early prospectors to the area. Many mining towns have come and gone, going through a boom and bust cycle as mines were depleted.

The Mount Mulligan mine disaster occurred on 19 September 1921. Seventy-five workers were killed, making it the third-worst coal mining accident in Australia.

=== Cyclones ===
The region suffered Queensland's worst maritime disaster on 4 March 1899 when the Mahina Cyclone destroyed all 100 ships moored in Princess Charlotte Bay. The entire North Queensland pearling fleet was in the bay at the time of the cyclone. Approximately 100 Aboriginals assisting survivors and 307 men from the pearling fleet were drowned. Its pressure was measured at 914 hPa with a recorded tidal surge of 13 m, the highest ever in Australia. The 1918 Mackay cyclone hit the Queensland coast in January of that year, killing 30 people.

In March 1997, Cyclone Justin resulted in the deaths of seven people. In early 2000, Cyclone Steve caused major flooding between Cairns and Mareeba. Cyclone Larry crossed the Queensland coast near Innisfail in March 2006. The storm resulted in an estimated $1.5 billion worth of damage and damaged 10,000 homes. 80% of Australia's banana crop was destroyed. Cyclone Monica was the most intense cyclone on record in terms of wind speed to cross the Australian coast. It impacted the Northern Territory and Far North Queensland in April 2006. In January 2011, Cyclone Yasi passed over Tully and resulted in an estimated $3.6 billion worth of damage, making it the costliest cyclone ever to hit Australia.

In December 2023, Cyclone Jasper crossed the Far North Queensland coast south of Cooktown as a category two cyclone. It later stalled over the southern York Peninsula resulting in record rainfall along the eastern coast that lead to the 2023 Cairns floods. Port Douglas received more than a metre of rain in a few days.

== Fauna ==
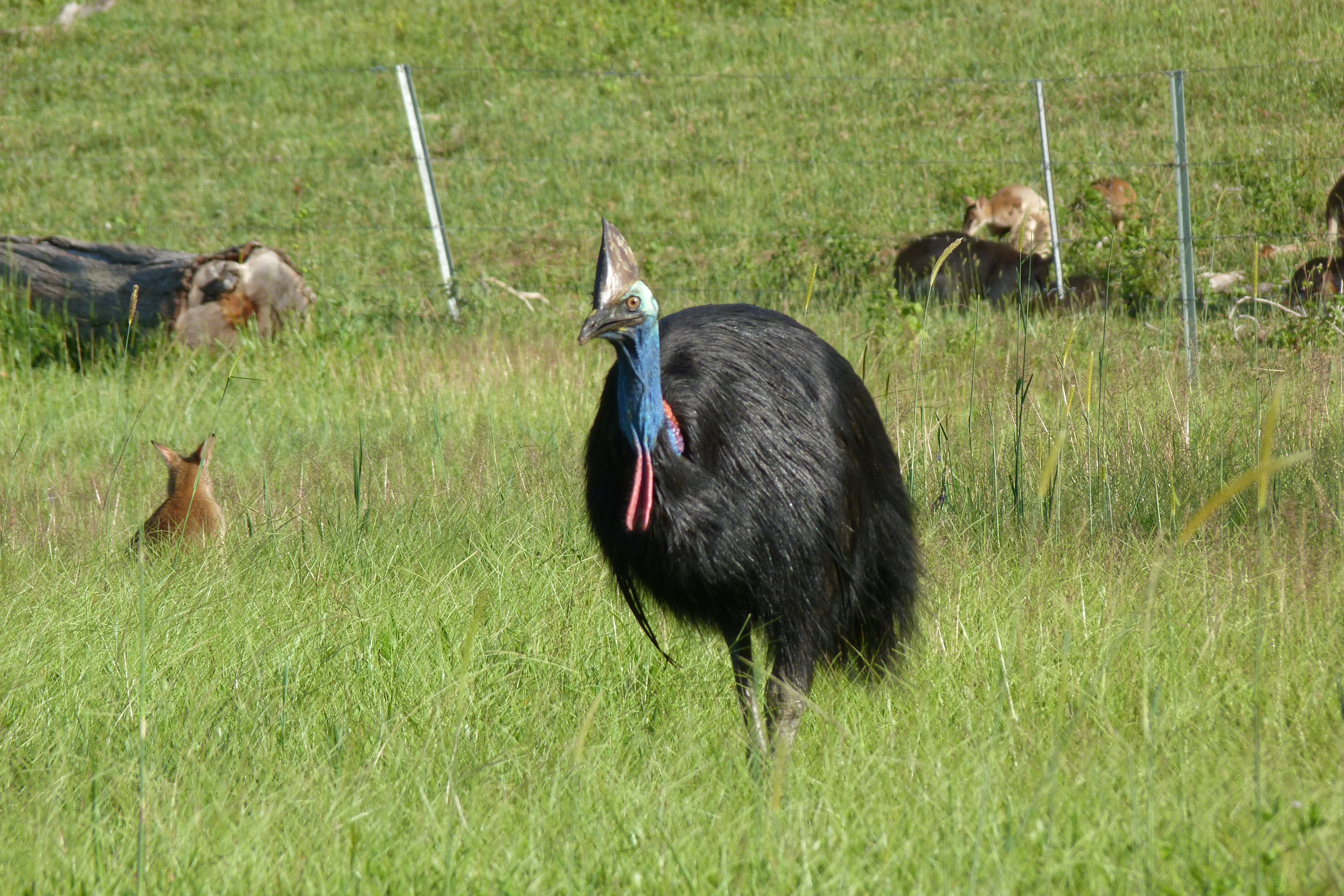
A Southern Cassowary, South Mission Beach, 2011

The region has many unique native animal species such as crocodile, endangered southern cassowary, koala, flying possum, python, water dragon, wallabie, flying fox, tree kangaroo, platypus, leaf-tailed gecko and bandicoot.

== Tropical North Queensland ==
Far North Queensland has a tropical climate and as such, the name Tropical North Queensland is also used as the name for the region, mostly due to the tourism industry. Tourism Tropical North Queensland (TTNQ) defines its area from Cardwell in the south up to the Torres Strait in the north and west to the Queensland border with the Northern Territory. However, the phrase Tropical North Queensland is ambiguous and may be used to name a wider area including parts of North Queensland, or even Mackay.

== See also ==
- Proposal for a new state of North Queensland
- List of regions in Australia
