= Leioproctus quinkanensis =

Scientific classification
- Kingdom: Animalia
- Phylum: Arthropoda
- Clade: Pancrustacea
- Class: Insecta
- Order: Hymenoptera
- Family: Colletidae
- Genus: Leioproctus
- Species: L. quinkanensis

Binomial name
- Leioproctus quinkanensis Leijs & Hogendoorn, 2021

Species of bee

Leioproctus quinkanensis, or Leioproctus (Protomorpha) quinkanensis, is a species of bee in the family Colletidae and subfamily Colletinae. It is endemic to Australia. It was described by entomologists Remko Leijs and Katja Hogendoorn in 2021.

== Distribution and habitat ==
The species occurs in the Quinkan Country of the Cape York Peninsula in Far North Queensland. The type locality is Laura.

== Behaviour ==
The adults are flying mellivores.
