= Palmer, Queensland =

Palmer
- Suburb
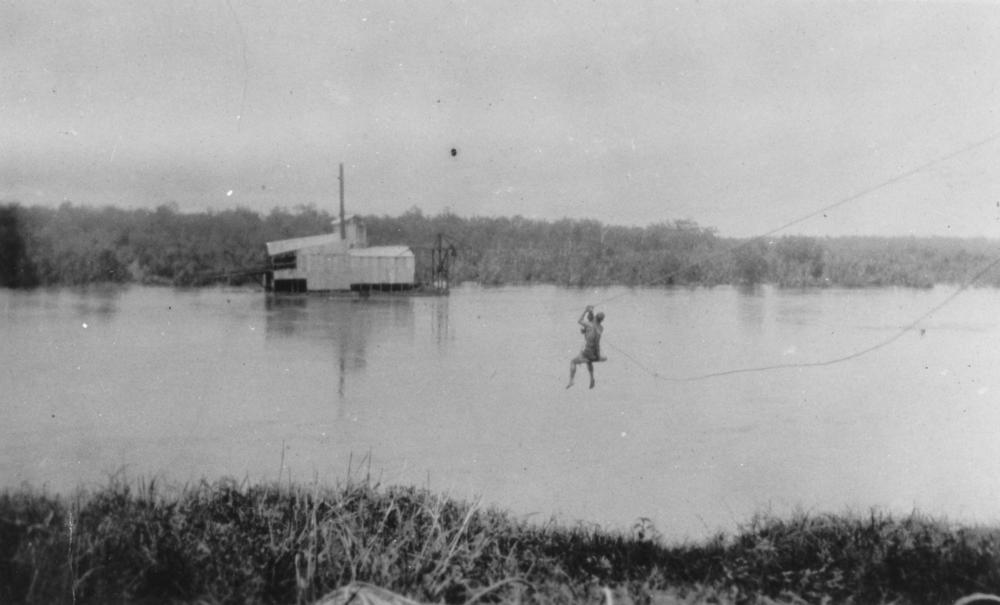
- Gold mining dredge on the Palmer River

- Interactive map of Palmer
- Coordinates: 15.9702°S 143.5386°E
- Country: Australia
- State: Queensland
- LGA: Shire of Cook
- Location: 99.2 km (61.6 mi) SW of Laura; 161 km (100 mi) W of Lakeland; 239 km (149 mi) WSW of Cooktown; 371 km (231 mi) NW of Cairns; 2,033 km (1,263 mi) NNW of Brisbane

Government
  - State electorate: Cook
  - Federal division: Leichhardt

Area
  - Total: 7,682.4 km^{2} (2,966.2 sq mi)
- Elevation: 204 m (669 ft)

Population
  - Total: 46 (2021 census)
  - Density: 0.00599/km^{2} (0.01551/sq mi)
- Time zone: UTC+10:00 (AEST)
- Postcode: 4892
- Mean max temp: 32.8 °C (91.0 °F)
- Mean min temp: 19.1 °C (66.4 °F)
- Annual rainfall: 1,036.4 mm (40.80 in)
Suburbs around Palmer
Maramie	Dixie	Laura
Maramie	Palmer	Lakeland
Groganville	Gamboola; Mount Mulgrave	Highbury

Palmer is a rural locality in the Shire of Cook, Queensland, Australia. In the 2021 census, Palmer had a population of 46 people.

The former towns (now neighbourhoods) of Byerstown, Lukinville, Maytown, Palmerville and Stonyville (or Stony Creek), all dating from the 1870s-1880s gold rushes around the Palmer River, are within the locality.

== Geography ==
The Great Dividing Range forms part of the northern boundary of the locality, entering from the north-east (Laura / Lakeland), passing through the north of the locality before exiting northward to Laura.

The Palmer River which flows through the locality from the east (Lakeland) to the west (Maramie). Being west of the Great Dividing Range, it is part of the Gulf of Carpentaria drainage basin.

The Palmer River Goldfields Resource Reserve is the eastern part of the locality to the north of the river. Apart from this protected area, the land use is grazing on native vegetation.

=== Climate ===
Palmer has a relatively dry tropical savanna climate (Köppen: Aw) with a short wet season from November to March and a long dry season from May to November. On average, the town experiences 103.9 clear days and 79.0 cloudy days per annum. The wettest recorded day was 1 April 1911 with 293.4 mm (11.55 in) of rainfall. Extreme temperatures ranged from 42.9 °C (109.2 °F) on 21 December 1935 to −0.1 °C (31.8 °F) on 12 June 1913.

Climate data for Palmer (16.00°S 144.08°E) (204 m (669 ft) AMSL) (1889-2025)
Month	Jan	Feb	Mar	Apr	May	Jun	Jul	Aug	Sep	Oct	Nov	Dec	Year
Record high °C (°F)	40.5 (104.9)	41.0 (105.8)	38.0 (100.4)	37.2 (99.0)	37.0 (98.6)	35.0 (95.0)	35.5 (95.9)	38.1 (100.6)	40.3 (104.5)	42.2 (108.0)	42.7 (108.9)	42.9 (109.2)	42.9 (109.2)
Mean daily maximum °C (°F)	33.4 (92.1)	32.6 (90.7)	32.3 (90.1)	32.2 (90.0)	31.2 (88.2)	30.0 (86.0)	30.0 (86.0)	31.4 (88.5)	33.7 (92.7)	35.6 (96.1)	36.2 (97.2)	35.4 (95.7)	32.8 (91.1)
Mean daily minimum °C (°F)	23.1 (73.6)	22.9 (73.2)	22.0 (71.6)	19.9 (67.8)	17.4 (63.3)	15.2 (59.4)	14.2 (57.6)	14.6 (58.3)	16.6 (61.9)	19.2 (66.6)	21.5 (70.7)	22.7 (72.9)	19.1 (66.4)
Record low °C (°F)	16.7 (62.1)	17.2 (63.0)	14.4 (57.9)	10.2 (50.4)	4.7 (40.5)	−0.1 (31.8)	0.5 (32.9)	3.9 (39.0)	5.0 (41.0)	8.6 (47.5)	11.6 (52.9)	13.9 (57.0)	−0.1 (31.8)
Average precipitation mm (inches)	266.2 (10.48)	259.9 (10.23)	176.7 (6.96)	48.3 (1.90)	15.4 (0.61)	11.4 (0.45)	5.2 (0.20)	3.2 (0.13)	8.0 (0.31)	20.7 (0.81)	60.9 (2.40)	158.5 (6.24)	1,036.4 (40.80)
Average precipitation days (≥ 0.2 mm)	17.8	17.6	14.7	6.4	2.9	1.9	1.1	0.8	1.1	2.6	5.9	11.5	84.3
Average afternoon relative humidity (%)	59	63	59	51	47	44	40	35	31	31	35	44	45
Average dew point °C (°F)	21.9 (71.4)	22.7 (72.9)	21.7 (71.1)	19.3 (66.7)	17.2 (63.0)	14.9 (58.8)	13.2 (55.8)	12.5 (54.5)	12.8 (55.0)	14.2 (57.6)	16.7 (62.1)	19.5 (67.1)	17.2 (63.0)
Source: Bureau of Meteorology (1889-2025)

== History ==
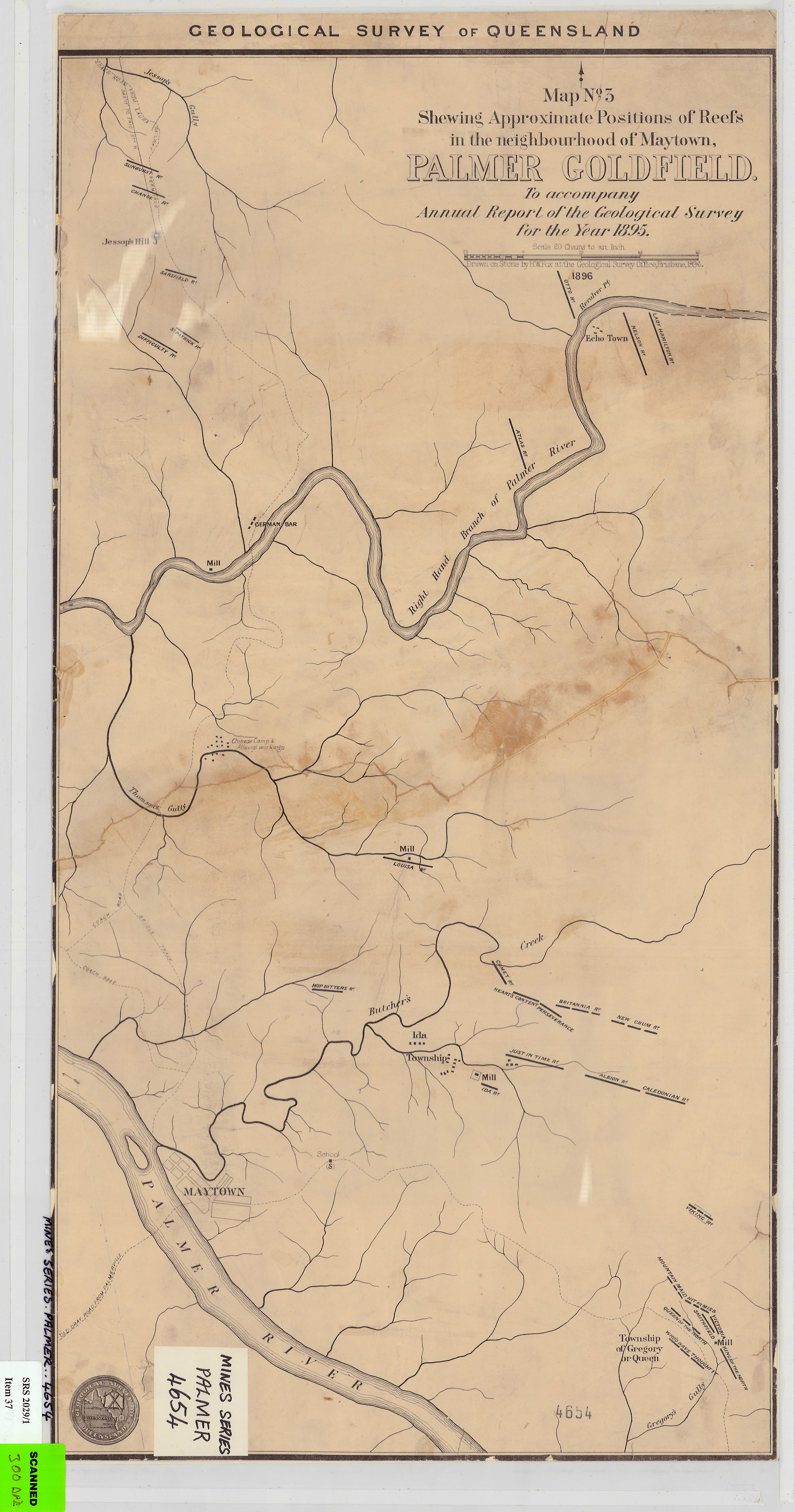
Map showing approximate positions of the gold reefs in the Palmer area, 1896

Kuku Yalanji (also known as Gugu Yalanji, Kuku Yalaja, and Kuku Yelandji) is an Australian Aboriginal language of the Mossman and Daintree areas of North Queensland. The language region includes areas within the local government area of Shire of Douglas and Shire of Cook, particularly the localities of Mossman, Daintree, Bloomfield River, China Camp, Maytown, Palmer, Cape Tribulation and Wujal Wujal.

Yalanji (also known as Kuku Yalanji, Kuku Yalaja, Kuku Yelandji, and Gugu Yalanji) is an Australian Aboriginal language of Far North Queensland. The traditional language region is Mossman River in the south to the Annan River in the north, bordered by the Pacific Ocean in the east and extending inland to west of Mount Mulgrave. This includes the local government boundaries of the Shire of Douglas, the Shire of Cook and the Aboriginal Shire of Wujal Wujal and the towns and localities of Cooktown, Mossman, Daintree, Cape Tribulation and Wujal Wujal. It includes the head of the Palmer River, the Bloomfield River, China Camp, Maytown, and Palmerville.

The locality takes its name from the Palmer River which flows through the locality from east to west and the Palmer goldfields around the river. The river was named on 5 August 1872 by William Hann after Arthur Hunter Palmer, then Premier of Queensland.

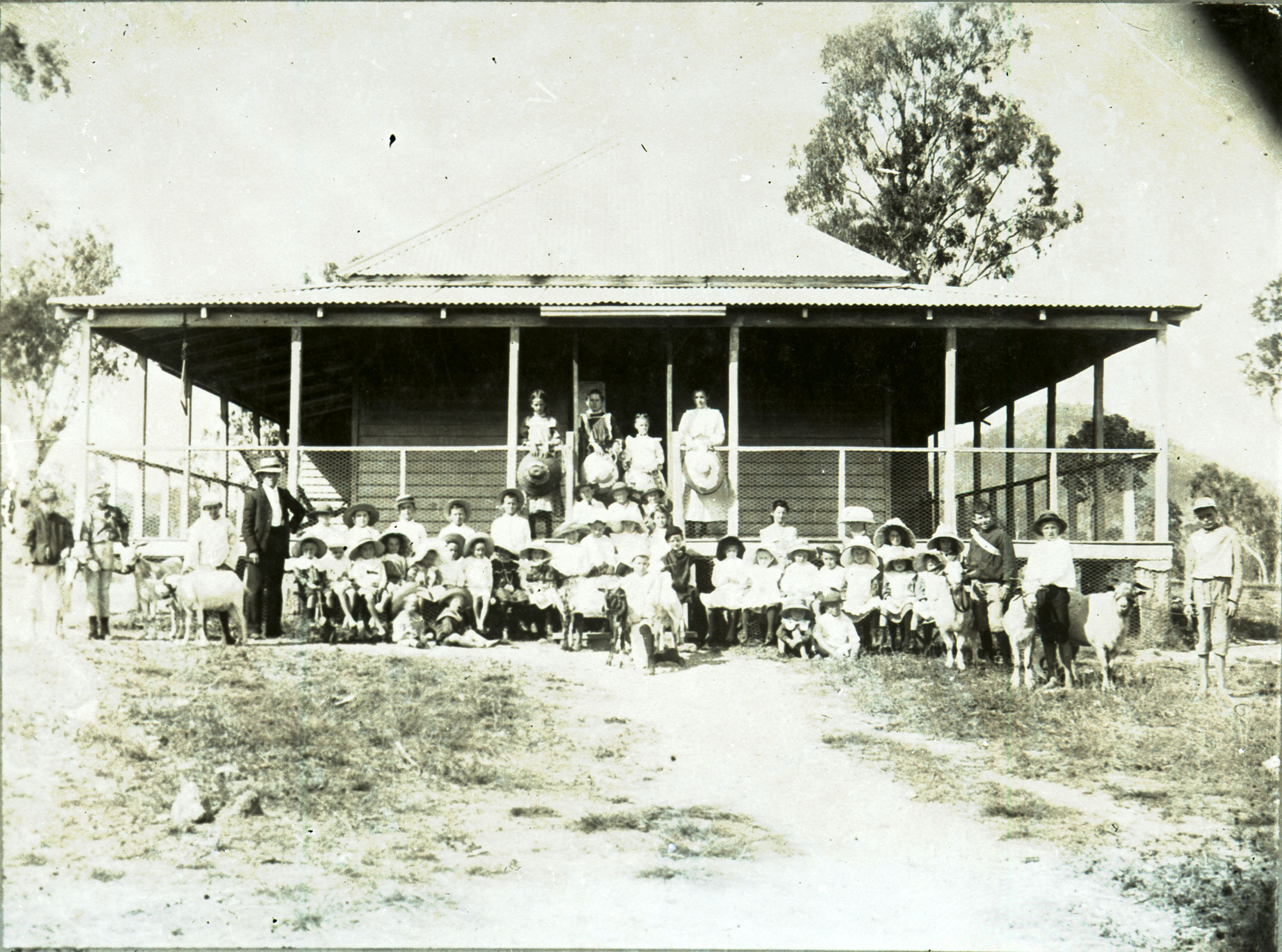
Group of children, adults and goats outside a building, thought to be Maytown School, circa 1900

Maytown State School opened circa 1877 in Maytown and closed in 1917. It reopened briefly in 1924, closing in 1925.

== Demographics ==
In the 2016 census, Palmer had "no people or a very low population".

In the 2021 census, Palmer had a population of 46 people.

== Heritage listings ==
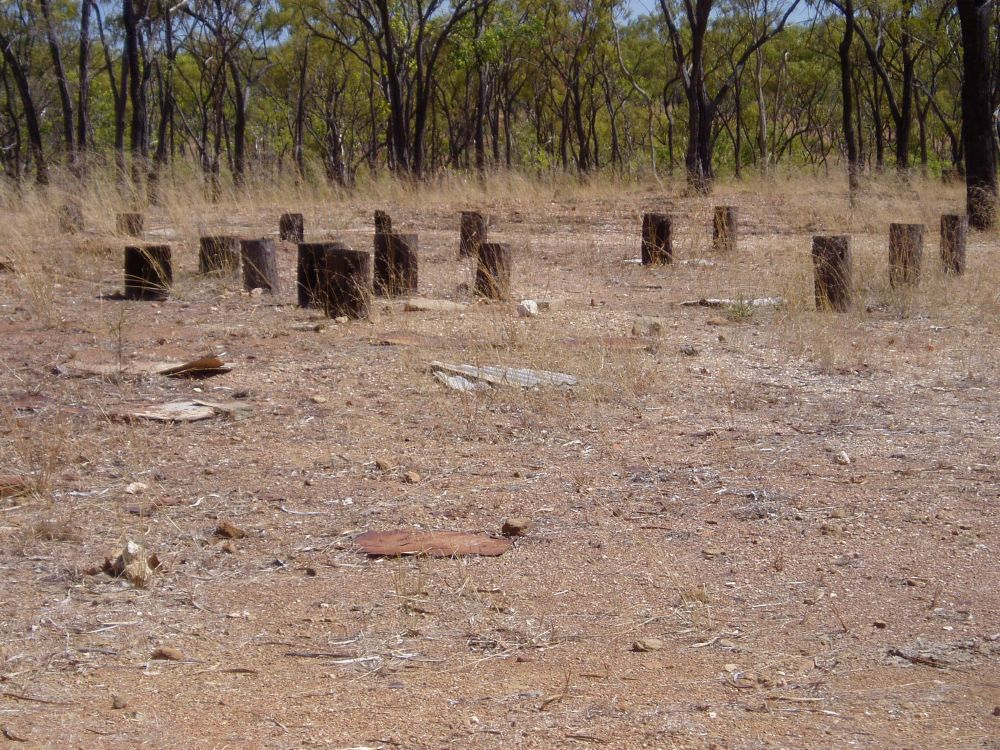
Thought to be the stumps of the Maytown School, 2003

Palmer has a number of heritage-listed sites, including:

- Wild Irish Girl Mine and Battery, Conglomerate Range
- Laura to Maytown Coach Road, Laura to Maytown
- Maytown Township, Maytown Town Reserve
- Alexandra Mine and Battery, Palmerville Station
- Stonyville Township, Stony Creek
- Palmer River Gold Company Dredge, Strathleven

== Education ==
There are no schools in Palmer nor nearby. The options are distance education and boarding school.

== Attractions ==
The Palmer River Goldfield Resource Reserve has old gold mines, rusting machinery, and some traces of the Maytown township for the visitor to explore.
