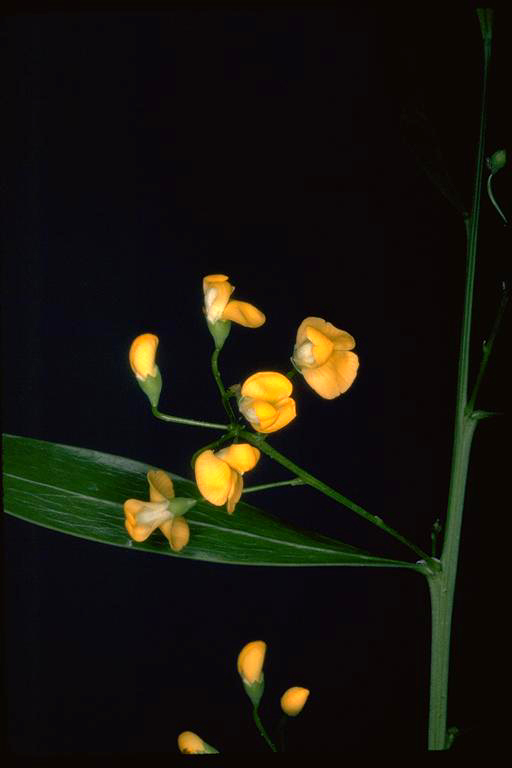
- In the Australian National Botanic Gardens

Scientific classification
- Kingdom: Plantae
- Clade: Tracheophytes
- Clade: Angiosperms
- Clade: Eudicots
- Clade: Rosids
- Order: Fabales
- Family: Fabaceae
- Subfamily: Faboideae
- Genus: Daviesia
- Species: D. flava

Binomial name
- Daviesia flava Pedley

= Daviesia flava =

Species of flowering plant

Daviesia flava is a species of flowering plant in the family Fabaceae and is endemic to Queensland. It is a glabrous shrub with linear or narrowly egg-shaped phyllodes, and uniformly yellow flowers.

== Description ==
Daviesia flava is a glabrous, compact to spreading shrub that typically grows to a height of up to 2 m (6 ft 7 in). Its leaves are reduced to linear to narrowly egg-shaped phyllodes 30–130 mm (1.2–5.1 in) long, 2–17 mm (0.079–0.669 in) wide with prominent veins on both sides. The flowers are arranged in one to several racemes of three to ten in leaf axils, the racemes on a peduncle 8–24 mm (0.31–0.94 in) long, the rachis 0.5–13 mm (0.020–0.512 in) long, each flower on a pedicel 4.5–11 mm (0.18–0.43 in) long with bracts about 1.5 mm (0.059 in) long at the base. The sepals are 3.0–3.5 mm (0.12–0.14 in) long and joined at the base, the two upper lobes joined for part of their length and the lower three triangular. The petals are uniformly yellow, the standard petal elliptic, 5.0–6.0 mm (0.20–0.24 in) long, 5–8 mm (0.20–0.31 in) wide, the wings 6–7 mm (0.24–0.28 in) long and the keel 5.0–5.5 mm (0.20–0.22 in) long. Flowering occurs from March to November and the fruit is a flattened, triangular pod 8–10 mm (0.31–0.39 in) long.

== Taxonomy and naming ==
Daviesia flava was first formally described in 1977 by Leslie Pedley in the journal Austrobaileya from specimens collected near the Kuranda-Mareeba road in 1962. The specific epithet (flava) means "yellow".

== Distribution and habitat ==
This species of pea grows in open forest and woodland on hillside and rocky slopes between Laura and Townsville in far north Queensland.

== Conservation status ==
Daviesia flava is listed as of "least concern" under the Queensland Government Nature Conservation Act 1992.
