= George Musgrave =

George Musgrave may refer to:

- George Musgrave (bush tracker), Australian bush tracker
- George Musgrave (MP), MP for Carlisle
- Sir George Musgrave, 10th Baronet, High Sheriff of Cumberland, of the Musgrave baronets
- George Musgrave (clergyman) (1798–1883), Church of England clergyman and travel writer (wikidata:Q18730350)
- George Musgrave (translator) (1855–1932), translator of Dante Alighieri's Divine Comedy
- George Musgrave (academic)
