= Kokomini =

Indigenous Australian people

The Kokomini (Gugumini) are reported to have been an indigenous Australian people of the state of Queensland, though some indications suggest the term may refer to a loose confederation of tribal groups. (Note: 'The second report considered by Sommer is that of the Koko-minni (Roth 1899), but has appended wordlists of four languages. The first is of the ‘Koko-minni Chief Camp: head of Annie Creek and King River’. Sommer calls Koko-Minni (literally 'speech-good' or 'speech intelligible') a 'loose . .confederation' of dialects (or even separate languages.)(1976:133). There is some information on some other members of the group, but none of it is substantial. Roth gives additional details on the territory, which leads Rigsby (pers.comm) to equate his Koko-Minni with Palmer’s (1884) Akoonkoon (or Akoonkol) and Koogobatha, although (as Rigsby also points out) Palmer seems to have regarded these as two different languages.')

== Name ==
The ethnonym Gugumini means good/intelligible speech.

== Country ==
The Gugumini are estimated by Norman Tindale to have had tribal grounds stretching over about 2,300 square miles (6,000 km^{2}) along the middle Palmer and Mitchell rivers, extending westwards to the area where the two meet. Their eastern limits were around Mount Mulgrave and Palmerville. Palmer reported their main camp to be at the head of Annie Creek and King River. Ursula McConnel wrote of the area between Wulbur and Yurgo as that of the Koko-mini and Kokowara.

== Customs ==
The Kokomini were said to have used a concoction drawn from Darwin stringybark leaves as a remedy for fever.

== History of contact ==
Kokomini territory was occupied by white settlers in 1874. Conflicts ensued as the Kokomini speared livestock introduced for grazing on their land, resulting in war between the two. The war was still ongoing a decade later, with the rule established that the indigenous Kokokmini had no right to be "let in" to their land, and a good many were shot down, putatively in "retaliation" for the loss of cattle and horses. The Queensland politician Edward Palmer ran a station in the area in the 1880s.

== Alternative names ==
- Koko-minni
- Koogominny, Kookaminnie, Koogaminny
- Koogobatha, Koogobathy
- Mirkin
- Akunkun, Akoon-koon
- Akoonkool
- Kookawarra. (Wakara exonym, with the pejorative sense of "poor speakers")

== Some words ==
- innar (kangaroo)
- oota (wild dog)
- athee. (father)
- among. (mother)

== Sources ==
- McConnel, Ursula (1898). "A Moon Legend from the Bloomfield River, North Queensland". Oceania. 2 (1): 9–25. doi:10.1002/j.1834-4461.1931.tb00020.x. JSTOR 40327351.
- Breen, Gavan (2016). "WE Roth and the Study of Aboriginal Languages in Queensland". In McDougall, Russell; Davidson, Iain (eds.). The Roth Family, Anthropology, and Colonial Administration. Routledge. pp. 133–155. ISBN 978-1-315-41728-8.
- Hale, H. M.; Tindale, Norman (1898). "Aborigines of Princess Charlotte Bay, North Queensland". Records of the South Australian Museum. 5 (1): 64–116.
- Mathews, R. H. (1898). "Australian divisional systems". Proceedings of the Royal Society of New South Wales. 32: 66–87. doi:10.5962/p.359289. S2CID 259614451.
- Mathews, R. H. (1899). "Division of tribes in the Northern Territory". Proceedings of the Royal Society of New South Wales. 33: 111–114.
- Mathews, R. H. (1907). "Notes on some aboriginal tribes". Proceedings of the Royal Society of New South Wales. 41: 67–87. doi:10.5962/p.359489. S2CID 259716576.
- McConnel, Ursula (September 1931). "A Moon Legend from the Bloomfield River, North Queensland". Oceania. 2 (1): 9–25. doi:10.1002/j.1834-4461.1931.tb00020.x. JSTOR 40327351.
- Palmer, Edward (1886). "Akoonkoon, Palmer River" (PDF). In Curr, Edward Micklethwaite (ed.). The Australian race: its origin, languages, customs, place of landing in Australia and the routes by which it spread itself over the continent. Vol. 2. Melbourne: J. Ferres. pp. 396–399.
- Richards, F. (1926). "Customs and language of the Western Hodgkinson aboriginals". Memoirs of the Queensland Museum. 8 (3): 249–265.
- Sharp, R. Lauriston (March 1939a). "Tribes and Totemism in North-East Australia". Oceania. 9 (3): 254–275. doi:10.1002/j.1834-4461.1939.tb00232.x. JSTOR 40327744.
- Sharp, R. Lauriston (June 1939b). "Tribes and Totemism in North-East Australia (Continued)". Oceania. 9 (4): 439–461. doi:10.1002/j.1834-4461.1939.tb00248.x. JSTOR 40327762.
- Tindale, Norman Barnett (1974). "Kokomini (QLD)". Aboriginal Tribes of Australia: Their Terrain, Environmental Controls, Distribution, Limits, and Proper Names. Australian National University Press.
