= George Musgrave (bush tracker) =

Dr George Musgrave (1921 – 9 February 2006) was an elder of the Kuku Thaypan clan and a famous Australian bush tracker. He was an Agu Alaya speaker.

.

He was born in his own country, near Rinyirru National Park. As children, he and Tommy George Senior were hidden in mailbags by the station owner, Fredrick Sheppard, to avoid removal by police and welfare officers.

As a result, they were able to grow up with their own people, and learn traditional law and language, management practices of their country and how to live off the land. Recently, they were able to successfully claim continuous ownership of traditional lands, and retain custody of some land at Gno-Coom (Saxby Waterhole).

George's senses were so sharp he could follow a week-old trail through dense scrub at night. He could identify tracks that were up to two months old. In August 2005 he was asked to track an off duty policeman who had become lost while pig hunting. Despite being 84 years old, he found the man in less than a day.

He also worked as a community policeman and musterer.

Together with Tommy George Senior, he founded the Ang-Gnarra Aboriginal Corporation at Laura, Queensland, the biennial Laura Festival of Traditional Dance and Culture, the Traditional Knowledge Recording Project and the Cape York Land Council.

They campaigned to protect the world-renowned Quinkan rock art near Laura, where they carried out custodial duties for special places, including the rock art galleries.

They shared their knowledge of the bush, their language and their customs with researchers and visitors. It would be difficult to find a piece of scholarly work on traditional language, culture or country in Cape York Peninsula that does not credit their expertise.

In 2005 he and Tommy George were each awarded an honorary Doctorate of Letters by James Cook University for their knowledge of traditional Aboriginal Law.

== Publications ==
- George, T., & G. Musgrave (1995). Our country, our art, our Quinkans. Laura, Queensland: Ang-Gnarra Aboriginal Corporation. ISBN 0-646-25392-1
