= Palmer River Gold Company Dredge =

Historical Australian dredge

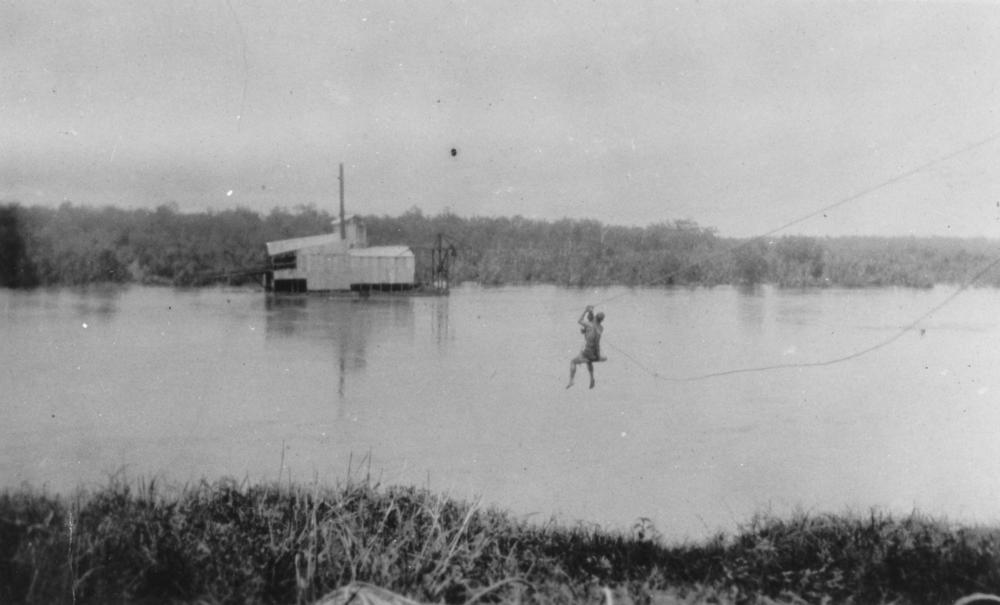
- Palmer River Gold Company Dredge

- Location within Queensland Location within Australia
- 15.8986°S 143.5312°E
- Location: King Junction, Palmer, Shire of Cook, Queensland, Australia

History
- Design period: 1919–1930s (interwar period)
- Built: 1930–c. 1935

Queensland Heritage Register
- Official name: Palmer River Gold Company Dredge
- Type: state heritage (built)
- Designated: 17 June 2003
- Reference no.: 601871
- Significant period: c. 1930 (fabric); 1930–c. 1935 (historical)
- Significant components: pontoon, machinery/plant/equipment – mining/mineral processing

Palmer River Gold Company Dredge is a heritage-listed dredge on the Palmer River at Strathleven, Palmer, Shire of Cook, Queensland, Australia. It was built from 1930 to c. 1935. It was added to the Queensland Heritage Register on 17 June 2003.

== History ==
The Palmer River Gold Company N.L., a Cairns company, took up ground along the Palmer River between Frome and Strathleven and carried out dredging operations between 1926 and 1935. The company originally estimated that 2.6 million cubic metres of auriferous material (rocks bearing gold) was available but after four years work it was found that the yields were less than 25% of the anticipated values. A total of 3,584 ounces (101,600 g) of gold was won during this period. The all-steel bucket dredge and pontoon was built by Messrs Chas. Ruwolt Pty Ltd of Richmond, Victoria and shipped to Cooktown then railed to Laura in mid 1930. From there, the dredging plant weighing in total 350 long tons (360 t) was carted by six-wheeled trucks (Morris and Thornycroft) over the Great Dividing Range to Strathleven, a distance of 133 kilometres (83 mi). The largest portion of the road was made by the company.

The dredge was erected under the supervision of Mr William Condron, consulting engineer for Ruwolt Pty Ltd, and Mr Walter Baker, the dredging company's General Manager. The dredge was capable of treating 50,000 cubic yards per month and had 31 buckets of 5 cubic feet of capacity. Dredging operations commenced at the end of December 1930 and were carried on into the wet season. However a photograph in 1932 (John Oxley Library: neg. 31/31) shows the dredge partly submerged and damaged by floodwaters. The date that the dredge ceased operation and was finally abandoned has not been confirmed.

== Description ==
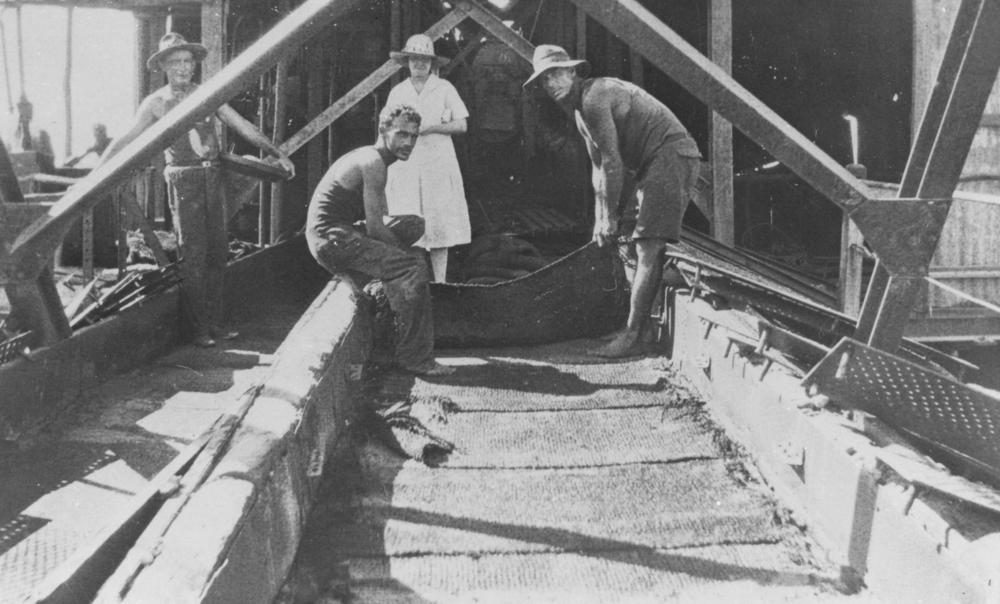
Mats on the deck of the dredge are used to collect gold from the river

The place contains the pontoon and partly intact superstructure and plant of a steam powered bucket dredge. The dredge which is partly buried under a high sand bar is situated in the middle of the river which is over 400 metres (1,300 ft) wide at the site. The pontoon measures 19 by 10 metres (62 by 33 ft). The total length from the head of the bucket ladder to the end of the stacker is 37 metres (121 ft). Ironwork throughout remains in good condition with the exception of the pontoon's rear plating which has corroded through at water level. All corrugated iron cladding has been removed but the iron frame and decking remains intact.

A twin cylinder horizontal steam engine has been removed and now lies alongside. The cog-train drive for the bucket chain remains but the chain now holds only two buckets. The washing trommel, jig mount and a large gravel pump remain in place. The boiler which was mounted on the starboard/right hand side may still be in place under the sand bar covering this area. Items of plant removed and left in the river bed and on the eastern bank include – the engine mount, camshaft, iron chimney section, a winch drum and 13 buckets. The company's campsite is located on the east bank, 500 metres (1,600 ft) north-east of the dredge.

The surviving plant includes:

- Steam gravel pump – W H Allen Son & Co Ld Bedford England Conqueror 14
- Two-cylinder horizontal steam engine (not in situ) – no brand
- Superstructure steel beams – Dorman Long & Co Mbro

== Heritage listing ==
Palmer River Gold Company Dredge was listed on the Queensland Heritage Register on 17 June 2003 having satisfied the following criteria.

The place is important in demonstrating the evolution or pattern of Queensland's history.

The dredge is significant as rare surviving evidence of contemporary technology for alluvial dredging and gold mining in Australia in the 1920s.

The place demonstrates rare, uncommon or endangered aspects of Queensland's cultural heritage.

The dredge is significant as rare surviving evidence of contemporary technology for alluvial dredging and gold mining in Australia in the 1920s. It is the earliest surviving steam dredge in Queensland, and possibly in Australia, and is a rare extant example of early dredge construction.

The place is important in demonstrating the principal characteristics of a particular class of cultural places.

It is the earliest surviving steam dredge in Queensland, and possibly in Australia, and is a rare extant example of early dredge construction. The dredge's survival despite more than 60 years annual exposure to the full force of wet season river flooding is a testament to its construction.

The place is important in demonstrating a high degree of creative or technical achievement at a particular period.

The dredge demonstrates achievements in overcoming considerable access, transport and operational constraints.
