= Stonyville Township =

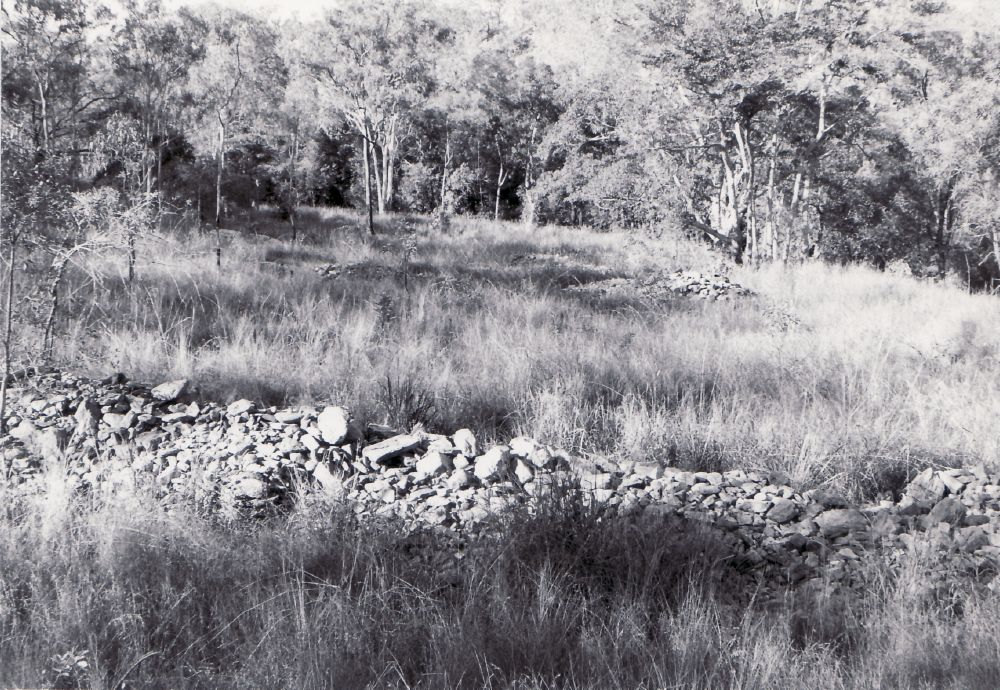
- Stonyville, 1994

- Location within Queensland Location within Australia
- 16.2539°S 144.3504°E
- Location: Mareeba Mining District, Palmer, Shire of Cook, Queensland, Australia

History
- Design period: 1870s–1890s (late 19th century)
- Built: 1870s–c. 1900

Queensland Heritage Register
- Official name: Stonyville Township, Water Race and Cemetery, Stony Creek Township
- Type: state heritage (archaeological)
- Designated: 21 October 1992
- Reference no.: 600433
- Significant period: 1870s–c. 1900 (historical)
- Significant components: other – mining/mineral processing: component, cemetery, trees/plantings, water race

Stonyville Township, Water Race and Cemetery is a heritage-listed mining camp at Mareeba Mining District, Palmer, Shire of Cook, Queensland, Australia. It was built from the 1870s to c. 1900. It is also known as Stony Creek Township, Stonyville Water Race, and Stonyville Cemetery. It was added to the Queensland Heritage Register on 21 October 1992.

== History ==
Stony Creek is one of a number of tributaries of Sandy Creek, in the Limestone district south of the Palmer River, that were subjected to a major rush and intensive alluvial mining by Chinese prospectors following James Venture Mulligan's discovery of gold in Sandy Creek in 1874. The alluvial gravels yielded fine gold for several years.

It is not recorded when prospecting first commenced in Stony Creek but presumably in the gold rush of 1874. A township developed on the southern side of a wide bend in the creek and in 1882 Len Yue had the hotel, John McLean and Sam Marris had butcher shops, and there were several Chinese stores. By September 1896 when the Government Geologist, Robert Logan Jack, passed through "Stony Creek Township" on his way from Groganville to the Palmer, he noted:

"... there are now only four inhabited houses in the street, and a few huts around, all occupied by Chinese. The chief feature of Stony Creek is a huge outcrop of micaceous quartzite-schist....There is a remarkable water-race on the right bank of the creek, which must have cost, inparts at least £500 per mile. The quartzite-schist crosses the creek again and again".

The water race is evidence of Chinese alluvial mining in the area and of the construction skills that had been developed. Prior to the arrival of the Chinese on Stony Creek in large numbers, the European prospectors are reported to have obtained "fantastic amounts" of alluvial gold. Later, the Chinese were reported to be "particularly strong" on Stony Creek. Hence their continuing presence at the time of Jack's visit in 1896 and their cemetery. It is presumed the area was abandoned in the first decade of this century.

== Description ==
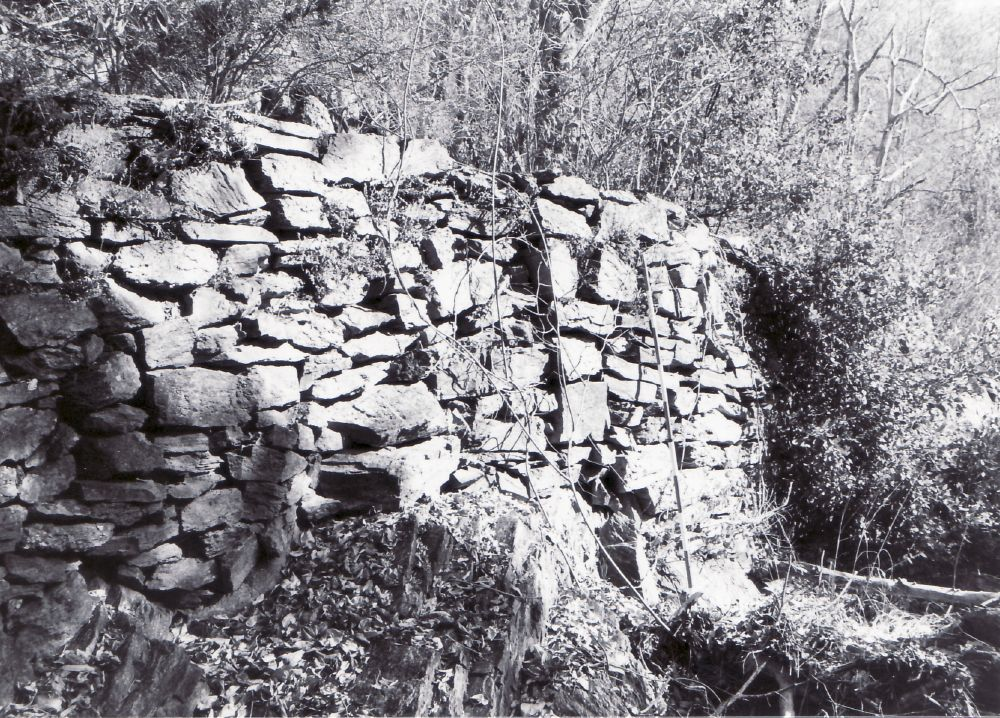
Stonyville Water Race, 1994

The township and cemetery occupy a cleared flat on a horseshoe bend of Stony Creek. A haulage road has recently been driven through the centre of the township to a large area of surface workings that scour the hillside to the north-west of the creek. Evidence of structures in Stony Creek township is now largely archaeological and includes stone surfaces, rock-lined borders and stone cooking places in scattered and disturbed condition. There are two small groups of mango trees.

The cemetery is situated immediately adjacent to the township on the north-west. Cemetery boundaries have recently been assumed with the erection of four corner posts. The area was covered with long grass at the time of survey and only two disturbed arrangements of stones, which may form the perimeter of the cemetery, were evident. The cemetery is reported to contain the foot stones of 15 graves. Two grave markers are reported to have been removed for "safe-keeping" by the Palmer River Historic Preservation Society.

The water race extends for about 1,000 metres (3,300 ft) along the northern and eastern banks of Stony Creek. For most of its length the race consists of a 1 to 2 metres (3 ft 3 in to 6 ft 7 in) wide channel partially cut into bed-rock and raised on a rubble and earth aqueduct up to 6 metres (20 ft) above the creekbed. Several short sections contain packed stone retaining walls 1 to 2.4 metres (3 ft 3 in to 7 ft 10 in) in height. The race is cut through bed rock for about 20 metres (66 ft) through a gorge. The race terminates at an area of past alluvial workings adjacent to Stonyville township.

== Heritage listing ==
Stonyville Township, Water Race and Cemetery was listed on the Queensland Heritage Register on 21 October 1992 having satisfied the following criteria.

The place is important in demonstrating the evolution or pattern of Queensland's history.

The place is significant in Queensland's history for illustrating the pattern of Chinese settlement and alluvial mining operations in a rugged and remote area of North Queensland.

The place demonstrates rare, uncommon or endangered aspects of Queensland's cultural heritage.

The archaeologically intact combination of water race, stone dams, creek alluvial workings, township site and cemetery is unique and the best surviving example of this type of place in Queensland.

The place has potential to yield information that will contribute to an understanding of Queensland's history.

The archaeologically intact combination of water race, stone dams, creek alluvial workings, township site and cemetery is unique and the best surviving example of this type of place in Queensland.

The place is important in demonstrating the principal characteristics of a particular class of cultural places.

The archaeologically intact combination of water race, stone dams, creek alluvial workings, township site and cemetery is unique and the best surviving example of this type of place in Queensland.

The place is important because of its aesthetic significance.

The place exhibits strong visual qualities.
