= Laura to Maytown Coach Road =

Historic road in Queensland, Australia

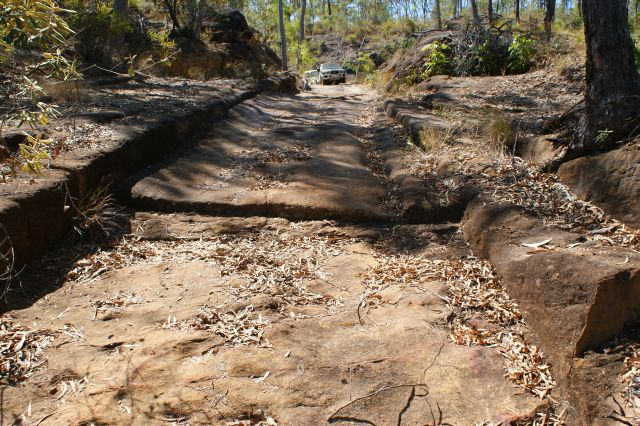
- 1895 descent & cutting

- Location within Queensland Location within Australia
- 15.9913°S 144.3065°E
- Location: Laura to Maytown, Shire of Cook, Queensland, Australia

History
- Design period: 1870s–1890s (late 19th century)
- Built: c. 1877–c. 1895

Queensland Heritage Register
- Official name: Laura to Maytown Coach Road
- Type: state heritage (built, archaeological)
- Designated: 21 October 1992
- Reference no.: 600427
- Significant period: c. 1877–c. 1895 (fabric, route formation)
- Significant components: cutting – road, drainage

Laura to Maytown Coach Road is a heritage-listed road between the towns of Laura and Maytown, Shire of Cook, Queensland, Australia. It was built from c. 1877 to c. 1895. It was added to the Queensland Heritage Register on 21 October 1992.

== History ==
The isolation of the Palmer Goldfield and the consequent high transport costs were a major obstacle to development that was never fully overcome. In February 1874 carriage from Cooktown over the track surveyed by Macmillian's party cost £200 per ton. Through increased competition, rates dropped to £70 per ton in 1875 when mining output was at its peak.

The main Palmer road from Cooktown followed a circuitous route north of the Conglomerate Range to Palmerville, but this was reduced over time. Maytown, centre of the reefing, did not have a road directly to it until 1877.

However erosion made road construction difficult and the hauling of machinery hazardous and slow. Wheeled traffic cut through the soft sandstone descent of the Conglomerate Range north of Maytown, making it particularly dangerous after rain. Archibald Campbell Macmillan attempted to prevent further erosion by easing gradients and constructing retaining walls on the most dangerous sections.

The Hann Divisional Board assisted with improvements so that by May 1880 a regular Cobb and Co coach service was inaugurated. The track eventually became the main route onto the Palmer from Laura and the historical section now traverse Reserve R16.

== Description ==
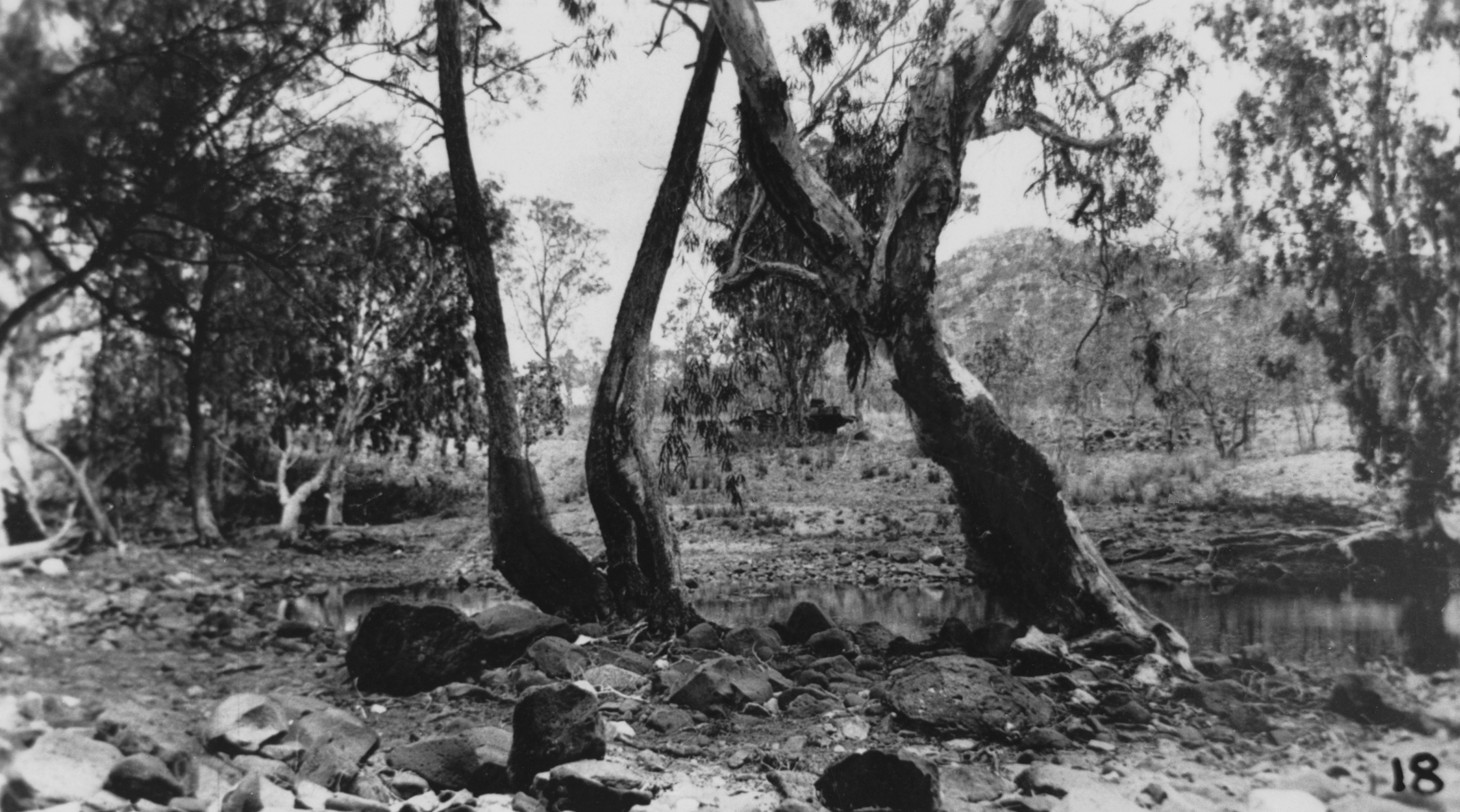
Laura to Maytown Road near the Palmer River, circa 1930

Originally the road represented the last leg of the long journey from Cooktown to the Palmer Goldfield. From Chalmers, 11 kilometres (6.8 mi) west of Laura, the road heads south on the eastern side of the Little Laura River to Patricks (1877). The road then takes an 1895 detour to Ripple Creek via a track to the west of the original track then heads south to the North Palmer River. Included in this section is a detour (c. 1895) to avoid the original track via Folders and Logan Jack Cairn. Both the original track and the detour are included in this listing. Before crossing the North Palmer River the track divides in two. These tracks are the result of the need for a reliable wet season track and both are included in this listing. The track heads south to Maytown via the original (1877) western track.

Places associated with the road include the Chalmers hotel site on the Little Laura River, Patricks hotel site, Ned's hotel site, Ripple Creek staging post site, Folders hotel and staging post site at the base of the Conglomerate Range, Larry Moore's shanty site, Jessops Creek and Jessops Gully alluvial and reef workings and the Gang Forward battery site near the North Palmer River. The three largest Chinese garden sites along the road are found at 14 Mile or Garden Creek, the Lone Star or Tommy Ah Toy's garden at Mossman Gorge, and a garden site between Jessops Hill and Jessops Creek.

Originally a hand-cut track connecting the Palmer River Goldfield with Cooktown via Laura. The track has since been partly re-formed as a graded road but contains some sections, particularly between Cradle Creek and the North Palmer River, which can demonstrate the original construction containing steep pinches, cuttings and stone drains.

== Heritage listing ==
Laura to Maytown Coach Road was listed on the Queensland Heritage Register on 21 October 1992 having satisfied the following criteria.

The place is important in demonstrating the evolution or pattern of Queensland's history.

The Laura to Maytown Coach road is significant in North Queensland history as the major arterial route to the Palmer Goldfield. The road is significant for its early association with the Cobb & Co coach line which began regular services in 1880. The road is of significance for its associated historical places including wayside house, staging posts, Chinese gardens and mine workings.

The place demonstrates rare, uncommon or endangered aspects of Queensland's cultural heritage.

It is one of the few remaining historic access routes on the Palmer which has not been subjected to extensive up-grading.

The place is important in demonstrating the principal characteristics of a particular class of cultural places.

It demonstrates notable engineering feats and road making techniques in steep rocky terrain in an isolated, high rainfall region of North Queensland.

The place is important because of its aesthetic significance.

The road continues in use and is recognised as a landmark feature by local residents and visitors.

The place is important in demonstrating a high degree of creative or technical achievement at a particular period.

It demonstrates notable engineering feats and road making techniques in steep rocky terrain in an isolated, high rainfall region of North Queensland.
