= Byerstown =

Byerstown Queensland
- Coordinates: 16.0333°S 144.7167°E
- Time zone: AEST (UTC+10:00)
- Location: 35.7 km (22 mi) SW of Lakeland (town); 114 km (71 mi) SW of Cooktown; 244 km (152 mi) NW of Cairns; 588 km (365 mi) NNW of Townsville; 1,922 km (1,194 mi) NNW of Brisbane
- LGA(s): Shire of Cook

Byerstown is a former gold rush town on the Palmer River, now within the locality of Lakeland in the Shire of Cook, Queensland, Australia. It was once a commercial hub for the surrounding goldfields and a stop on the road to the Hodgkinson goldfields further afield.

== History ==
Byerstown had been established by 1873, when it was home to merchants servicing those travelling to and from the Hodgkinson goldfields. It was named for John Byers, senior partner in the firm of Byers and Little, which had numerous business interests in the town.

A post office at Byerstown opened in April 1876. A Court of Petty Sessions at Byerstown was proclaimed on 21 July 1876. A mining warden was based at Byerstown from c. 1875 and a Warden's Court formally proclaimed on 16 November 1876.

A new road from Cooktown to Maytown opened through Byerstown c. 1876. In 1876, the town was reported to have "ten stores, three blacksmiths, one butcher, one Chinese doctor and a good garden".

In 1877, the Australian Handbook' described it as a "post and savings' bank town", containing "several stores and hotels, many of them owned by Chinamen, who are the dominant party here."

The Warden's Court ceased operation c. 1879; the exact date is not recorded.

The town also had a number of tin mines into the 1880s.

In 1881, the town was described as having "4 butchers; 6 stores; 3 hotels" and having a population of "about 30 Europeans and 300 Chinese, employed almost exclusively in alluvial mining". Another source says the population was 129 inhabitants in 1881.

By 1881, the postal service from Cooktown to Maytown had bypassed the town, and post had to be sent from Maytown. In 1882, Pugh's Queensland Almanac wrote that the route via Byerstown could "only be used by pack horses", whereas the newer alternative could be travelled by coach. It noted Byerstown as having three hotels, Burr's Hotel, the Canton Hotel, and Hang Mei. The post office was downgraded to a receiving office in January 1883 and closed c. 1884.

By 1883, it was described as "nearly deserted for the Normanby diggings, about eight miles distant" and in 1884 reportedly had only "three Europeans (police) and eight Chinese residents". The Court of Petty Sessions had closed by the end of 1889.

Despite the town's demise, in March 1890, the Queensland Government officially gazetted 640 acres (260 ha) for a township at Byerstown.
