= Wild Irish Girl Mine and Battery =

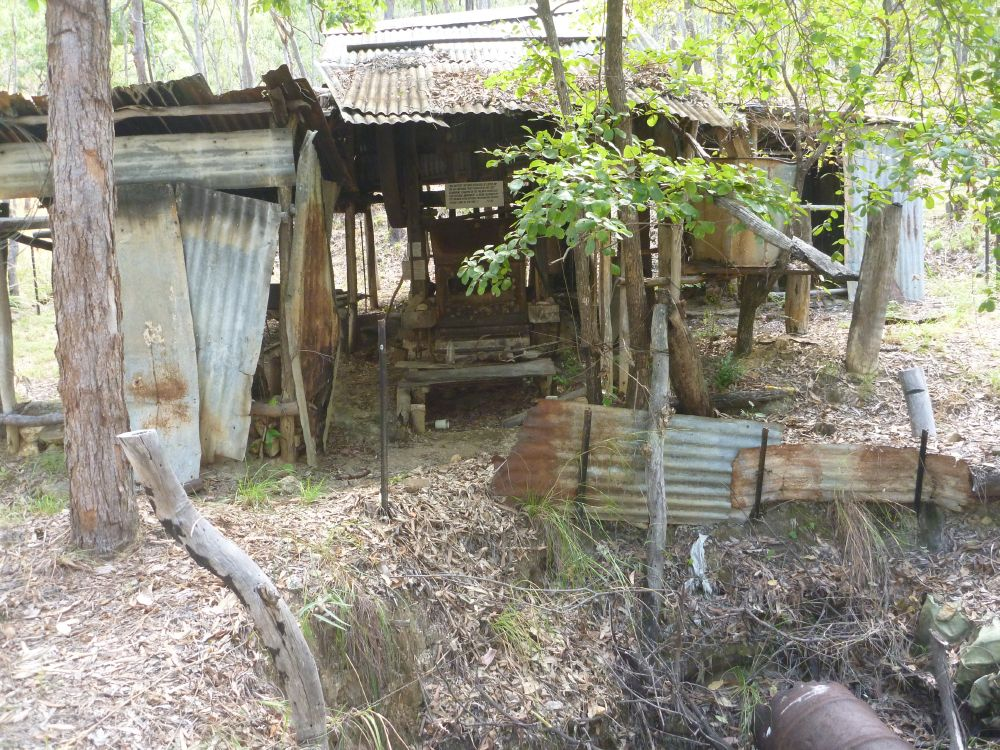
- Wild Irish Girl Mine and Battery, 2014

- Location within Queensland Location within Australia
- 15.9931°S 144.3057°E
- Location: Conglomerate Range, Maytown, Shire of Cook, Queensland, Australia

History
- Design period: 1870s–1890s (late 19th century)
- Built: c. 1894–1980s

Queensland Heritage Register
- Official name: Wild Irish Girl Mine and Battery, Emily Battery
- Type: state heritage (built, archaeological)
- Designated: 21 October 1992
- Reference no.: 600428
- Significant period: c. 1894 (fabric); 1894–1980s (historical)
- Significant components: grave marker, machinery/plant/equipment – mining/mineral processing, weir, well, residential accommodation – quarters, battery/crusher/stamper/jaw breaker, shaft, wall/s – retaining, tank – water, battery shed, pathway/walkway, mine – open cut, water race, track, adit, forge/blacksmithy

Wild Irish Girl Mine and Battery is a heritage-listed mine at Conglomerate Range, Maytown, Shire of Cook, Queensland, Australia. It was built from c. 1894 to 1980s. It is also known as Emily Battery. It was added to the Queensland Heritage Register on 21 October 1992.

== History ==
In the 1890s, long after the impetus of reef mining on the Palmer had waned, prospectors identified a system of thin quartz reefs immediately under the escarpment of the Conglomerate Range. The Best Friend, Bal Gammon and Wild Irish Girl reefs outcropped on a ridge and could be mined by adits. In 1894 John Trainor and James Burchall took over the Wild Irish Girl PC from its prospectors and after driving a 13 metres (43 ft) tunnel struck a rich formation, the Native Girl Reef.

Trainor and Burchell invested £300 in their own crushing plants to save on cartage costs. The mill, named the Emily, was operating by October 1894 and was the most compact plant conventional nineteenth century technology could provide: three head of gravity stamps powered by a light vertical engine. By 1897 the Emily had crushed 342 tons from the Native Girl reef, yielding 427 ounces, enough to pay for the machinery five times over. Interest in the area slowly declined, but in the early years of this century the mill was still crushing occasional parcels from the local reefs.

During World War I a small upturn occurred when the Kipling's Crossing reefs were discovered and ore was sent to the Emily for crushing. The mill was probably under the control of Sam Wonnacott, who lived in the ranges, worked the Wild Irish Girl and nearby mines, and crushed public stone whenever the demand arose. He owned the mill by the 1920s and changed its name to the Wild Irish Girl.

In 1930 Sam Elliott bought the mill from Wonnacott and continued working the Cradle Creek mines and crushing at the Wild Irish Girl battery for over thirty years. Sam Elliott was the last hard rock miner operating on the Palmer Goldfield. He died in 1986 and is buried in the Maytown cemetery.

== Description ==
The place, situated on the edge of the Conglomerate Range escarpment, comprises a closely associated group of components including mine workings, battery shed and quarters, earlier hut and camp site, alluvial workings and water races, and a Chinese grave. There are three groups of mine workings, the Native Girl comprising narrow open cut workings and underground workings with air shafts, the Friendly Girl comprising shallow open cut workings, and the Wild Irish Girl mine comprising an adit and underground workings.

The mines are connected by a skid path to a small battery shed and living quarters. The battery shed is constructed of bush timber clad with corrugated iron. The shed contains a vertical boiler and semi- portable engine, a light three-head prospecting battery, a workshop, a living area and fireplace, and a small water tank on a recently collapsed timber stand. A caved water shaft and a stone forge are located alongside the shed. A small watercourse which runs past the battery contains three stone overshot weirs.

An extensive area of early alluvial workings commences along the watercourse about 100 metres (330 ft) south of the battery. This area, which extends for over 400 metres (1,300 ft) contains diverted creek beds, stone walled channels, and a stone lined water race. A packhorse track follows the creek. The grave of Chinese prospector is located above the bridle track. The remains of Wonnacott's camp is located between the battery shed and alluvial workings. The site comprises flagstone and earth surfaces, timber uprights and a scatter of domestic items including two iron beds with bedsteads.

The surviving plant includes:

- Three-head stamp battery - Walkers Ltd Maryborough
- One-cylinder semi-portable vertical steam engine - Tangye Archer.
- Vertical boiler - Smellie & Company, Brisbane

== Heritage listing ==
Wild Irish Girl Mine and Battery was listed on the Queensland Heritage Register on 21 October 1992 having satisfied the following criteria.

The place is important in demonstrating the evolution or pattern of Queensland's history.

The Wild Irish Girl battery is significant in Queensland's history as the most intact early steam powered prospecting battery on the Palmer Goldfield and in North Queensland. It was also the last steam powered stamp battery to operate on the Palmer, having worked for approximately 90 years. It is a tangible link with nineteenth century mining on the Palmer Goldfield.

The place demonstrates rare, uncommon or endangered aspects of Queensland's cultural heritage.

The place is important in demonstrating the principal characteristics of a particular class of cultural places.

The close combination of an intact battery and plant, intact living quarters, mine workings and alluvial workings is rare in Queensland. The Wild Irish Girl battery has the only intact three-head battery and the only intact vertical engine (a Tangye Archer) recorded in association with an historic mining place in Queensland. The place is of national significance because of its intactness. It also has the only surviving battery shed, in North Queensland, which incorporates living quarters.
