= Gugu Rarmul =

Indigenous Australian people

The Gugu Rarmul were an indigenous Australian people of the state of Queensland, one of several whose speech was called Gugu Yawa ('Possum language').

== Country ==
According to Norman Tindale, the Kokojawa had 3,000 square miles (7,800 km^{2}) of territory. They lived southeast of the Morehead River down to Laura. Due south their boundary was on the south to North Palmer River and the Great Dividing Range. They were present at the upper Mossman and Kennedy rivers.

== Alternative names ==
- Djauan
- Kokorarmul
- Jouon
- AkuRarmul
- Bindaga (generic term for both the Kokojawa and several other tribes south of Princess Charlotte Bay)

== Sources ==
- "AIATSIS map of Indigenous Australia". AIATSIS. 14 May 2024.
- Hale, H. M.; Tindale, N.B. (1933). "Aborigines of Princess Charlotte Bay, North Queensland". Records of the South Australian Museum. 5 (1). Adelaide: 64–116.
- Roth, W. E. (1897). Ethnological Studies among the North-West-Central Queensland Aborigines (PDF). Brisbane: Edmund Gregory, Government Printer.
- Tindale, Norman Barnett (1974). "Kokojawa (QLD)". Aboriginal Tribes of Australia: Their Terrain, Environmental Controls, Distribution, Limits, and Proper Names. Australian National University Press. ISBN 978-0-708-10741-6.
