= Tommy George =

Australian Aboriginal elder

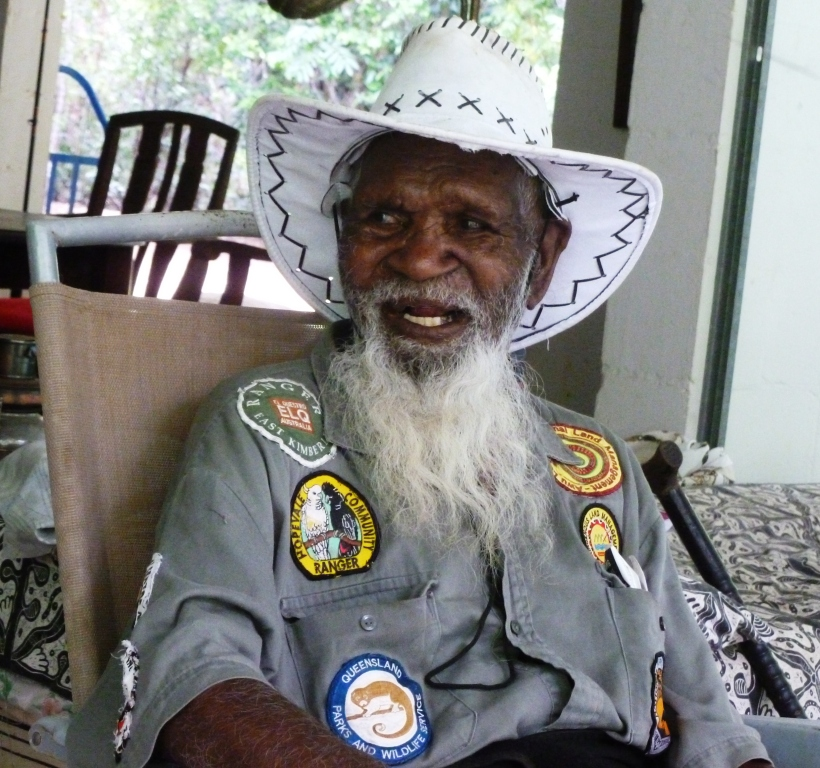
Dr. Tommy George in Cooktown, Queensland, 2011

Tommy George Sr. (c. 20 September 1928 – 29 July 2016) was an elder of the Kuku Thaypan clan on Cape York Peninsula, Queensland, Australia. He was the last fluent Awu Laya (Kuku Thaypan language) speaker.

== Biography ==
He was born in his own country, near Rinyirru National Park. As children, he and his elder brother, George Musgrave, were hidden in mailbags by the station owner, Fredrick Sheppard, to avoid removal by police and welfare officers.

As a result, they were able to grow up with their own people, and learn traditional law and language, management practices of their country and how to live off the land. Recently, they were able to successfully claim continuous ownership of traditional lands, and retain custody of some land at Gno-Coom (Saxby Waterhole).

Together they founded the Ang-Gnarra Aboriginal Corporation at Laura, Queensland, the biennial Laura Festival of Traditional Dance and Culture, the Traditional Knowledge Recording Project (Mulong, with Victor Steffensen) and the Cape York Land Council.

They campaigned to protect the world-renowned Quinkan rock art near Laura, where they carried out custodial duties for special places, including the rock art galleries. They shared their knowledge of the bush, their language and their customs with researchers and visitors. An example of the strength of their sharing was the work they did to share ways of recording traditional knowledge with Sámi communities in Northern Finland. It would be difficult to find a piece of scholarly work on traditional language, culture or country in Cape York Peninsula that does not credit their expertise.

He spent many years working as a stockman on cattle properties on Cape York Peninsula which he loved but was only rarely paid for. He married Laura Gordon (née Banjo) in Laura and they had six children together. He later became a ranger and worked for many years caring for the rock art in the Laura region which was on his wife's country battling to protect it and helping to record and interpret the many stories and traditions about it and his own Kuku Thaypan country.

In 2005 he was awarded an honorary Doctorate of Letters by James Cook University for his ecological expertise along with his elder brother Dr. George Musgrave.

George died in the Cooktown, Queensland Hospital on 29 July 2016.

== Publications ==
- George, T., & G. Musgrave (1995). Our country, our art, our Quinkans. Laura, Queensland: Ang-Gnarra Aboriginal Corporation. ISBN 0-646-25392-1
- George, T., & M. Tresize (1995). Quinkan rock art - Images on rock from the Laura area: Ang-Gnarra Aboriginal Corporation.

== Films ==
- Tommy George is in the documentary The Last Trackers of the Outback which features his brother, George Musgrave.
- He is also in the short film, "The Sugar Bag Project".
