= Gugu Thaypan language =

Australian Aboriginal language

Kuku-Thaypan
- Awu Alaya
- Native to: Australia
- Region: Cape York Peninsula, Queensland
- Ethnicity: Kuku Thaypan, Gugu Rarmul
- Extinct: 29 July 2016, with the death of Tommy George
- Language family: Pama–Nyungan: Paman; Thaypan; Kuku-Thaypan
- Dialects: Koko-Rarmul

Language codes
- ISO 639-3: typ
- Glottolog: thay1248
- AIATSIS: Y84 Kuku Thaypan, Y71 Gugu Rarmul
- ELP: Awu Laya

Kuku-Thaypan is an extinct Paman language spoken on the southwestern part of the Cape York Peninsula, Queensland in Australia, by the Kuku-Thaypan people. The language was sometimes called Alaya or Awu Alaya. Koko-Rarmul may have been a dialect, though Bowern (2012) lists Gugu-Rarmul and Kuku-Thaypan as separate languages. The last native speaker, Tommy George, died on 29 July 2016 in Cooktown Hospital.

== Phonology ==
=== Vowels ===
Kuku-Thaypan has six vowels and two marginal vowels possibly only in loan words.

	Front	Central	Back
Close	i	ɨ	u
Mid	e		o
Mid			(ɔ)
Open	(æ)	a	

- Sounds /æ/ and /ɔ/ are only marginal, as phonemes.
- /e/ is heard as [ɛ] when after palatals and /j/.

=== Consonants ===
Kuku-Thaypan has 23 consonants.

		Peripheral		Laminal		Apical	
		Labial	Velar	Dental	Palatal	Alveolar	Retroflex
Plosive	voiceless	p	k	t̪	c	t	
Plosive	prenasal	ᵐb	ᵑɡ	ⁿ̪d̪	ᶮɟ	ⁿd	
Fricative		β	ɣ	ð			
Nasal		m	ŋ	n̪	ɲ	n	
Rhotic						r	
Lateral						l	
Approximant		w			j		ɻ

- /r/ may be heard as a voiceless trill [r̥] when in initial position.
- /r/ may freely be heard as a tap [ɾ] or trill [r].
