= Quinkan rock art =

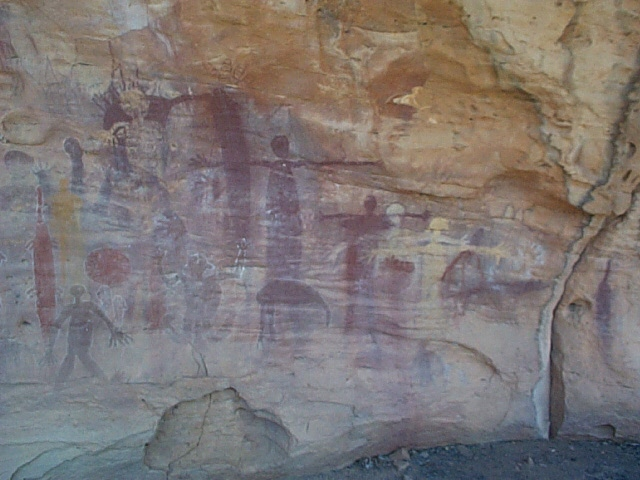
- Example of Quinkan rock art 2002

- Location within Queensland
- 15°49′00″S 144°25′00″E
- Location: near Laura, Queensland, Australia

Australian National Heritage List
- Official name: Quinkan Country
- Type: Listed place
- Designated: 10 November 2018
- Reference no.: 106262

Quinkan rock art refers to a large body of locally, nationally and internationally significant Aboriginal rock art in Australia of a style characterised by their unique representations of "Quinkans" (an Aboriginal mythological being, often spelt "Quinkin"), found among the sandstone escarpments around the small town of Laura, Queensland (aka Quinkan region or Quinkan country). Quinkan Country was inscribed on the Australian National Heritage List on 10 November 2018.

== Location ==
The Australian Heritage Commission's 1980 entry on the register of the national estate describes the Quinkan rock art as being located across 230,000 hectares of rugged sandstone plateaux and escarpments 4 km south east of Laura and 50 km west of Cooktown.

Selected sites are open for visits by the public, through guided tours with local Aboriginal guides organised by the Quinkan Regional Cultural Centre. Split Rock, approximately 15 km south of Laura, is currently open to self-guided visitors for a small fee. The Quinkan Reserves, owned by Aboriginal Trustees, are closed to public access.

== Significance ==
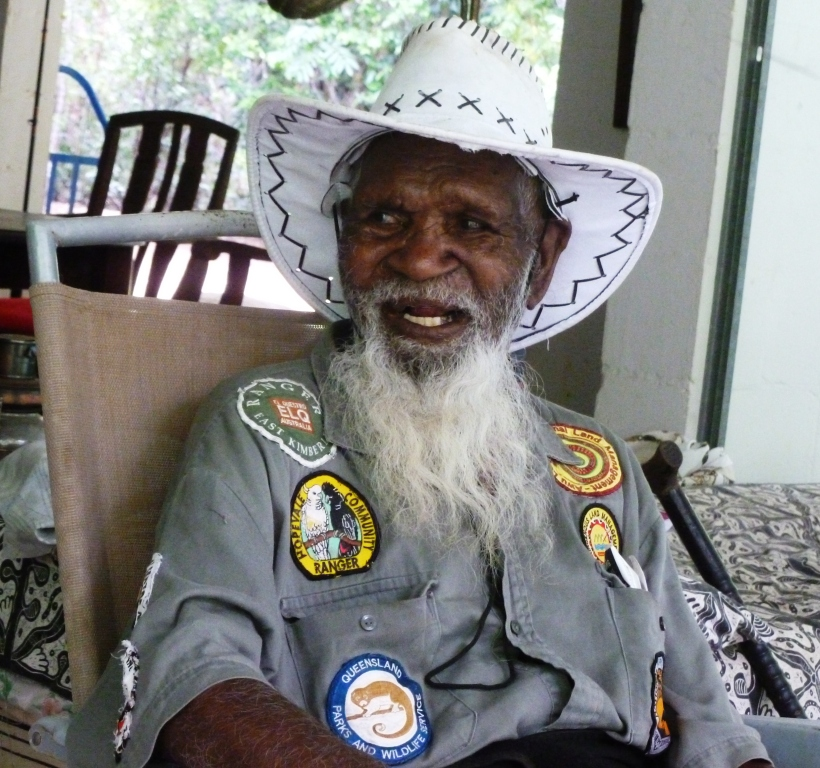
Tommy George in Cooktown, Queensland 2011

The Australian Heritage Commission's 1980 national estate entry describes the Quinkan rock art as constituting "some of the largest bodies of prehistoric art in the world. The paintings are generally large and well preserved, and engravings of great antiquity occur. The Quinkan art is outstanding both in variety, quantity and quality."

The two brothers, George Musgrave and Tommy George dedicated their lives to protecting the rock art and teaching a number of younger Aboriginal Traditional Owners about the history and stories relating to their connection to the land and rock art of the Quinkan region.

== Description ==
Rock art types include painting, stencil and engravings. Painting is generally in a figurative style, with people, animals and their tracks and mythical beings are depicted, usually in one or two colours. Red ochre dominates although white, yellow, black and a rare blue pigment also exist. Engravings of both figurative and abstract styles are found throughout Quinkan country.

Cultural heritage of the Quinkan region also includes story places, campsites and other evidence of Aboriginal people's long occupation history. In the 1870s the Palmer River Gold Rush brought a large influx of European and Chinese miners into Quinkan country, with thousands of miners traversing through here between the goldfields and the port of Cooktown. Despite the violent clashes that took place between miners and Aboriginal people, and the subsequent attempts at control of Aboriginal people by government policy, a highly significant connection to country and culture by Aboriginal people remains.

== See also ==
- Australian Aboriginal religion and mythology

== Gallery ==
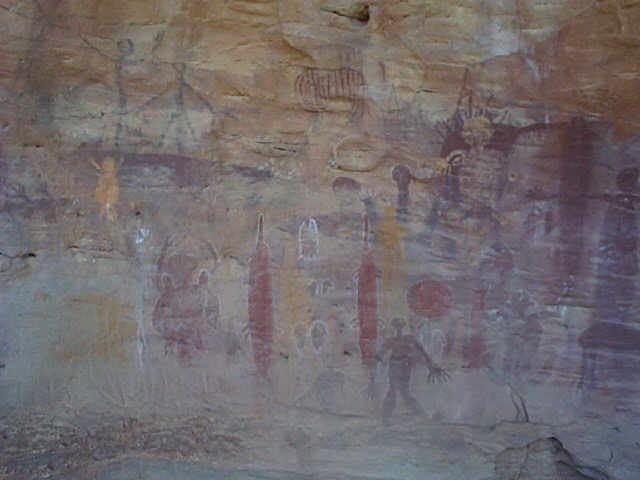

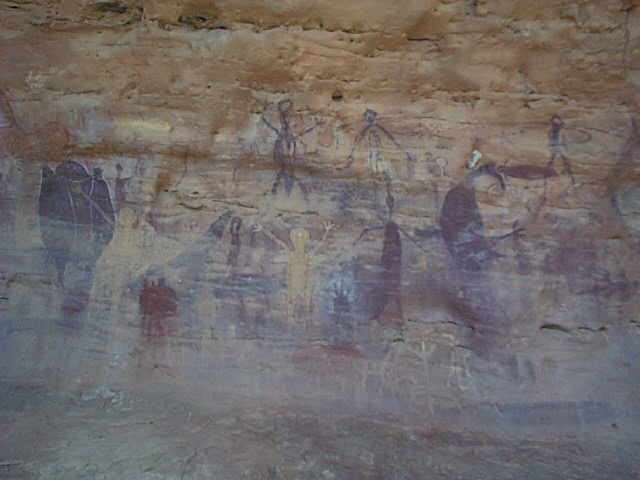

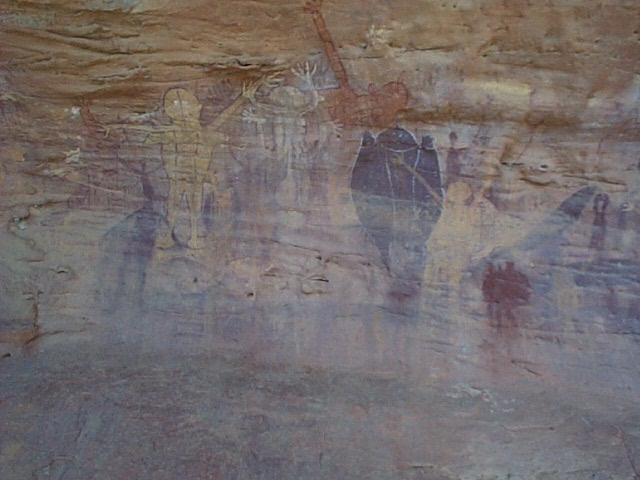

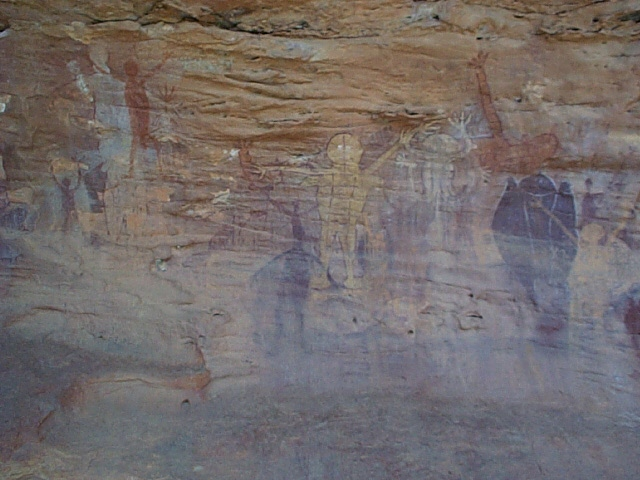
