= Alexandra Mine and Battery =

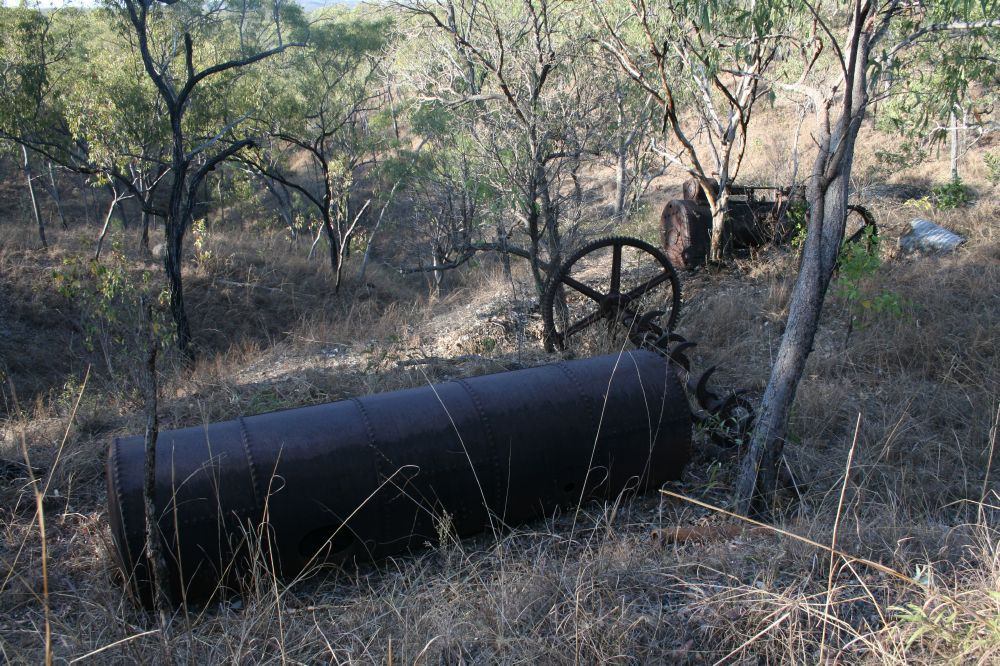
- Boiler and equipment, 2009

- Location within Queensland Location within Australia
- 16.0987°S 144.3182°E
- Location: Palmerville Station, Maytown, Shire of Cook, Queensland, Australia

History
- Design period: 1870s–1890s (late 19th century)
- Built: c. 1878–1898

Queensland Heritage Register
- Official name: Alexandra Mine and Battery, Alexandra PC
- Type: state heritage (built, archaeological)
- Designated: 21 October 1992
- Reference no.: 600429
- Significant period: c. 1878–1898 (fabric, historical)
- Significant components: terracing, chimney/chimney stack, flue, shaft, mullock heap, battery/crusher/stamper/jaw breaker, adit, road/roadway, machinery/plant/equipment – mining/mineral processing

Alexandra Mine and Battery is a heritage-listed mine at Palmerville Station, Maytown, Shire of Cook, Queensland, Australia. It was built from c. 1878 to 1898. It is also known as Alexandra PC.It was added to the Queensland Heritage Register on 21 October 1992.

== History ==
Mining began in the Palmer River area in 1876 and production commenced from the "Alexander PC" (one of the earliest prospecting claims) in 1878. Crushings of selected ore enabled the mine to average a spectacular eight ounces of gold per ton during the 1870s. By 1880, the Alexandra had crushed a mere 183 long tons (186 t) of stone for a yield of 1,262 ounces (35,800 g) of gold, grossing well over £5,000. However cartage and crushing costs were high as the ore had to be taken 16 kilometres (9.9 mi) to the battery. Therefore, a gold yield of two-three ounces per ton was required before a profit could be considered.

Small scale production went on intermittently until 1895 when Edwin Field installed a steam pump and winding gear, taken from the Louisa and Queen mines in 1895 and erected a battery at the Alexandra. He undertook development work, pumping out the mine and retimbering and began crushing in 1897. But, although operations continued on a small scale for nearly two years, the reef yielded just over one ounce to the ton.

At the end of 1898 the mine closed. In twenty years 499 long tons (507 t) of ore had been raised for a total of 1,810 ounces (51,000 g) of gold, an average of 3.6 ounces (100 g) to the ton. The mine was never worked again and the battery frame was removed in 1940.

== Description ==
The place is situated on a ridge at the head of a gully, about 500 metres (1,600 ft) south of the Palmer River, at co-ordinates 16.06.01S - 144.19.00E. The mine workings and battery are closely confined on a terraced bench. The site of the managers house is evident alongside the road on top of the ridge and comprises a broken cement surface. A grinding pan has been removed to the house site.

The mine workings are aligned along the strike of the reef and include, on the terrace level, a caved main shaft and an earlier shaft. An adit has been driven in from the gully to meet the main shaft. A single cylinder portable steam engine is located alongside the main shaft. (Since a survey of the site in 1982 a pump arm has been placed alongside the main shaft). Mullock has been dumped into the gully to form a dam. The watercourse now bypasses the dump. Another group of workings comprising a shaft and mullock dumps is located about 100 metres (330 ft) south-east on a spur of the ridge.

The battery plant includes a Cornish boiler in a brick mount with a flue leading to an intact nine metre high metal chimney. Immediately alongside the boiler is the body of a single cylinder horizontal engine. Alongside the engine are two mortar boxes which appear to have remained in situ although the stamper frame has been removed. Seven of the ten stamper rods are still standing in the mortar boxes. The camshaft is nearby.

The surviving plant includes:

- Cornish boiler - J.W.Sutton & Co Brisbane
- One-cylinder portable steam engine - no brand (Clayton & Shuttleworth ?)
- One-cylinder horizontal steam engine - no brand.
- Boiler casing (converted to a water tank) - no brand.
- Pump arm (not in situ)
- 2 Five-stamp mortar boxes - no brands
- Grinding pan (at manager's house site, not part of battery)
- Langlands Foundry

== Heritage listing ==
Alexandra Mine and Battery was listed on the Queensland Heritage Register on 21 October 1992 having satisfied the following criteria.

The place is important in demonstrating the evolution or pattern of Queensland's history.

The Alexandra mine and battery are significant in the evolution and pattern of reef mining in North Queensland from 1876 to 1898. The existence of a tin battery on a gold mining site illustrates the ad hoc and practical development of mining on the Palmer goldfield.

The place demonstrates rare, uncommon or endangered aspects of Queensland's cultural heritage.

The survival of the mine and battery site, complete with a Cornish boiler still in its brick bed and with an intact steel chimney, is rare, both in Queensland and in Australia. The single cylinder horizontal steam engine is also very early and rare.

The place has potential to yield information that will contribute to an understanding of Queensland's history.

The place demonstrates unusual technology in the use of a three outlet mortar box, usually associated with tin mining, and the site has the potential to yield more information about nineteenth century milling techniques.

The place is important in demonstrating the principal characteristics of a particular class of cultural places.

The Alexandra battery is situated on a narrow hillside terrace directly adjacent to the mine workings. The tightly grouped plant and machinery and nine metre high chimney form a compact and easily interpreted site. The place is one of the best preserved and most intact mining sites on the Palmer goldfield.
