= Kuku-Warra =

Aboriginal Australian people

The Kokowara were an indigenous Australian people of the state of Queensland.

== Name ==
The ethnonym, applied to them by other tribes, namely Kokowara, means 'rough speech'. Their autonym, or word for themselves, had not been ascertained as of 1974.

== Country ==
According to Norman Tindale, the Kokowara had some 1,800 square miles (4,700 km^{2}) of tribal land on the Normanby River, extending south from Lakefield to Laura and the Laura River. Their central camping area was at a place called Daidan on the Deighton River.

== Alternative names ==
- Kookawarra
- Coo-oo-warra
- Gugu-Warra
- Laura-Deighton tribe

== Sources ==
- "AIATSIS map of Indigenous Australia". AIATSIS. 14 May 2024.
- Cole, Noelene (2004). "Battle Camp to Boralga: a local study of colonial war on Cape York Peninsula, 1873-1894" (PDF). Aboriginal History. 28: 156–189.
- Dutton, H. S. (22 January 1901). Carroll, A. (ed.). "Goa. Miorli. Coo-coowarra". Science of Man and Journal of the Royal Anthropological Society of Australasia. 3 (12). Sydney: 208–209 – via Trove.
- Hale, H. M.; Tindale, N.B. (1933). "Aborigines of Princess Charlotte Bay, North Queensland". Records of the South Australian Museum. 5 (1). Adelaide: 64–116.
- Tindale, Norman Barnett (1974). "Kokowara (QLD)". Aboriginal Tribes of Australia: Their Terrain, Environmental Controls, Distribution, Limits, and Proper Names. Australian National University Press. ISBN 978-0-708-10741-6.
