= Maytown, Queensland =

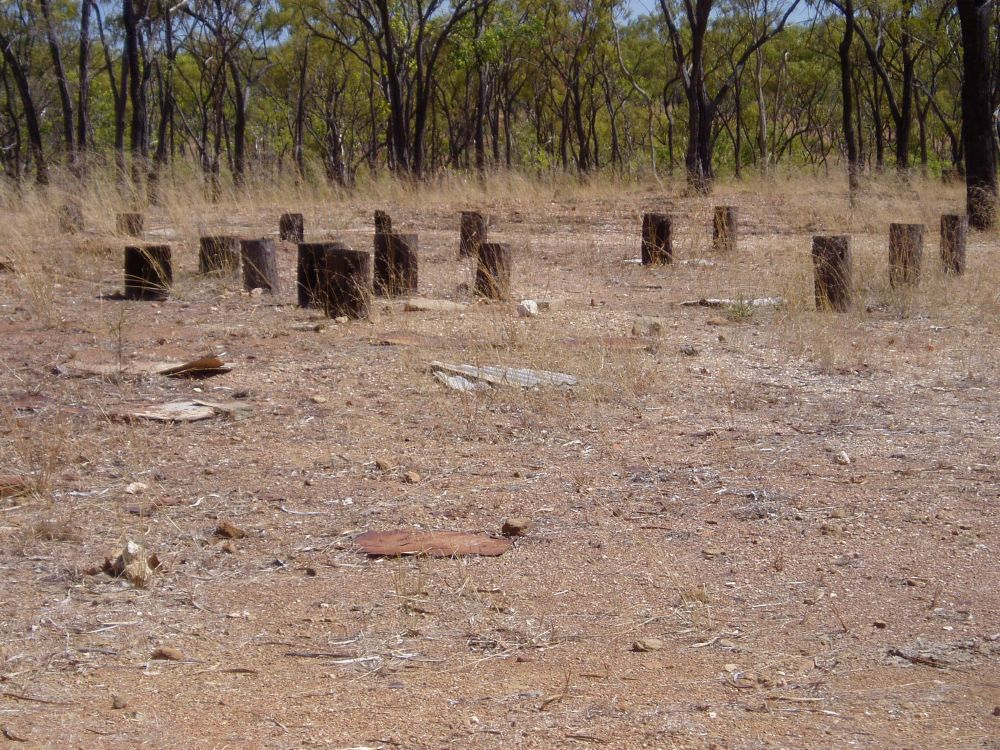
- Maytown ruins, possibly stumps of the former school, 2003

- Location within Queensland
- 16.0497°S 144.2878°E
- Location: Maytown Town Reserve, Palmer, Shire of Cook, Queensland, Australia

History
- Design period: 1870s–1890s (late 19th century)
- Built: c. 1874–1920s

Queensland Heritage Register
- Official name: Maytown Township
- Type: state heritage (archaeological, built)
- Designated: 1 June 2004
- Reference no.: 602255
- Significant period: c. 1874–1920s (fabric); 1874–1945 (historical)
- Significant components: oven, cemetery, fence/wall – perimeter, pole/s – telegraph, memorial – rock/stone/boulder, kerbing and channelling, hut/shack, signage – interpretative

Maytown was the main township on the Palmer River Goldfields in Far North Queensland, Australia. It is now a ghost town within locality of Palmer in the Shire of Cook, having been active from c. 1874 to the 1920s. It was added to the Queensland Heritage Register on 1 June 2004.

== History ==
Kuku Yalanji (also known as Gugu Yalanji, Kuku Yalaja, and Kuku Yelandji) is an Australian Aboriginal language of the Mossman and Daintree areas of North Queensland. The language region includes areas within the local government area of Shire of Douglas and Shire of Cook, particularly the localities of Mossman, Daintree, Bloomfield River, China Camp, Maytown, Palmer, Cape Tribulation and Wujal Wujal.

Yalanji (also known as Kuku Yalanji, Kuku Yalaja, Kuku Yelandji, and Gugu Yalanji) is an Australian Aboriginal language of Far North Queensland. The traditional language region is Mossman River in the south to the Annan River in the north, bordered by the Pacific Ocean in the east and extending inland to west of Mount Mulgrave. This includes the local government boundaries of the Shire of Douglas, the Shire of Cook and the Aboriginal Shire of Wujal Wujal and the towns and localities of Cooktown, Mossman, Daintree, Cape Tribulation and Wujal Wujal. It includes the head of the Palmer River, the Bloomfield River, China Camp, Maytown, and Palmerville.

After James Venture Mulligan's discovery of gold on the Palmer River in August 1873, a rush followed and was sustained for several years by further alluvial finds. An estimated twenty to thirty thousand people made their way to the field or Cooktown in the early years. It was regarded as an ideal "small man's field" for diggers without capital and experience had the opportunity to get rich quickly.

The alluvial mining communities tended to concentrate in ephemeral canvas camps. The most substantial were Palmerville, on the eastern edges of Kokomini territory, Maytown and Byerstown, whose establishment reflected an eastward movement of the mining population along the river. In May 1875 Maytown became the administrative and business centre of the field.

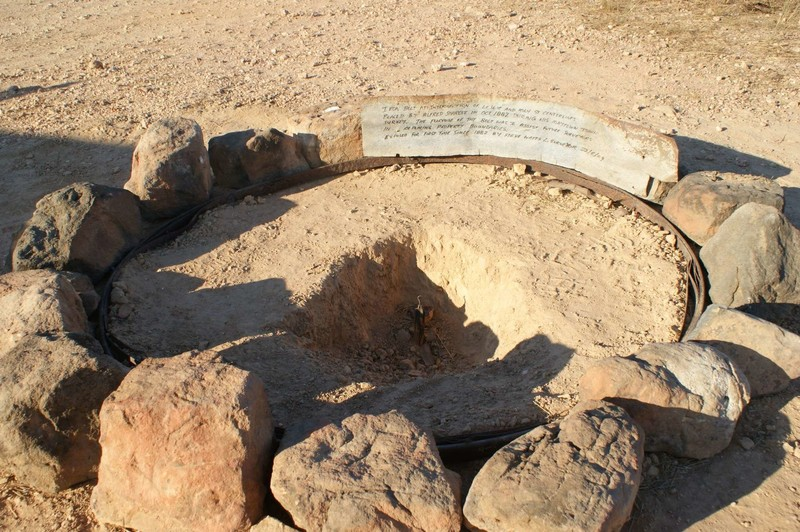
Surveyor's bolt in the centre of Maytown, 2009

Originally called Edwardstown after the local butcher, John (Jack) Edwards, the town was surveyed in 1875 by Archibald Campbell MacMillan. It has been claimed that MacMillan named it Maytown after his daughter; however, his only daughter Mary Eleanor (but known as May) was not born until 3 July 1880 and the name Maytown had been in use since at least 1874. In 1876 there were 12 hotels, 6 stores, 3 bakers, 3 tobacconists and stationers, Edwards the butcher, lemonade factory and a surgeon. The sheer size of the population, estimated in May 1877 at 19,500 for the field, kept money circulating among commercial houses for essentials and luxury goods, but at the same time, there was little financial investment in the permanent manifestations of settlement.

By 1882 the number of hotels had declined to six, and there were two European Stores, 10 Chinese stores, two banks, two butchers, baker, blacksmith, saddler, chemist, lemonade factory and printer. A post office existed from 1876 to 1945. By 1877, the Golden Age newspaper was printed followed by the Palmer Chronicle in 1883.

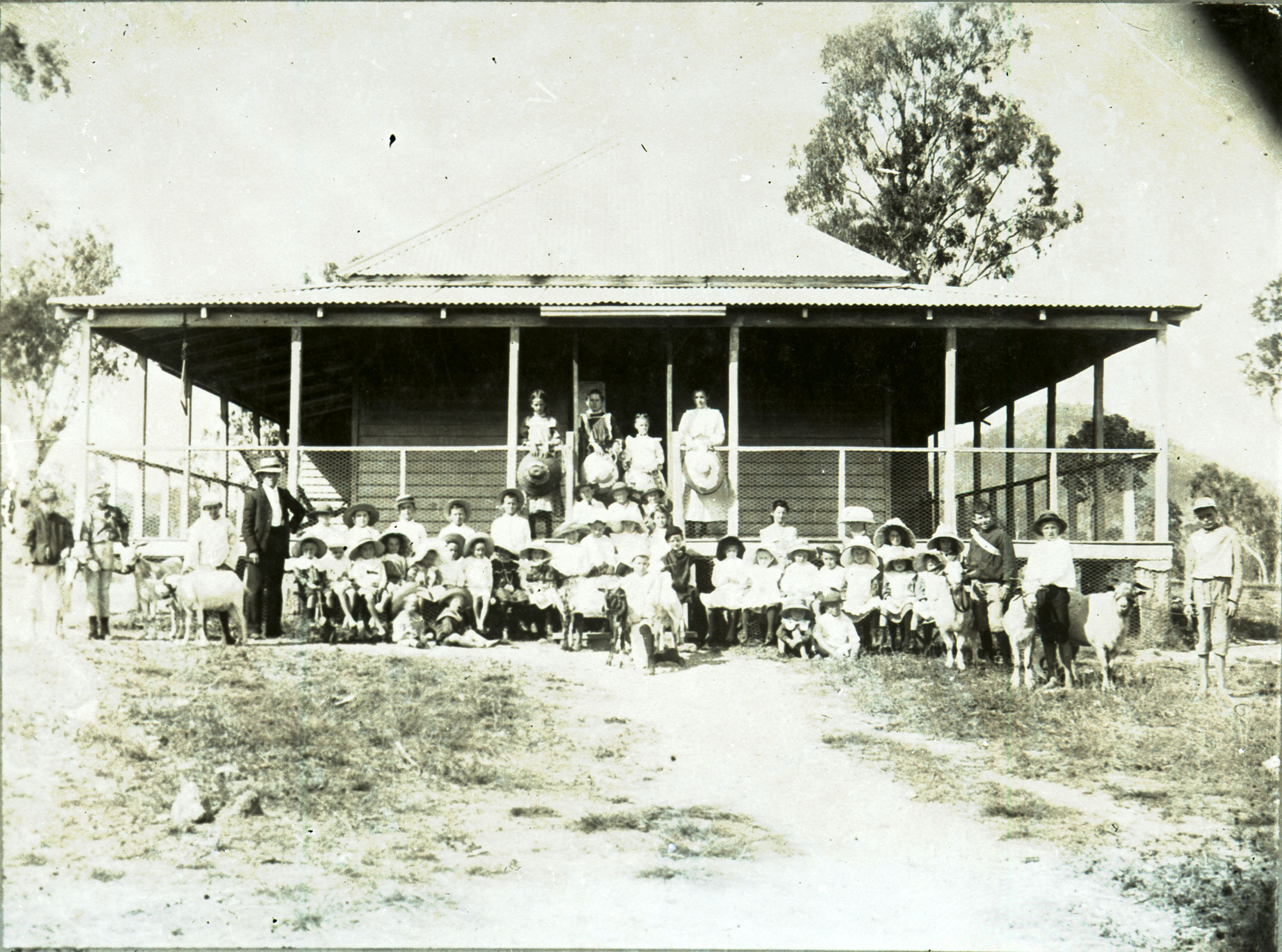
Group of children, adults and goats outside a building, thought to be Maytown School, circa 1900.jpg

Mining Warden Philip Frederic Sellheim, an educated family man residing at Maytown, bemoaned the lack of social institutions and initiated the establishment of a hospital, school and Miners' Institute Library, although these did not eventuate until the 1880s when most of Maytown's population had departed. In 1886 the population was 154 Europeans and 450 Chinese. There was no Christian church, but there was a Chinese temple.

Maytown State School opened circa 1877 and closed in 1917. It reopened briefly in 1924, closing in 1925.

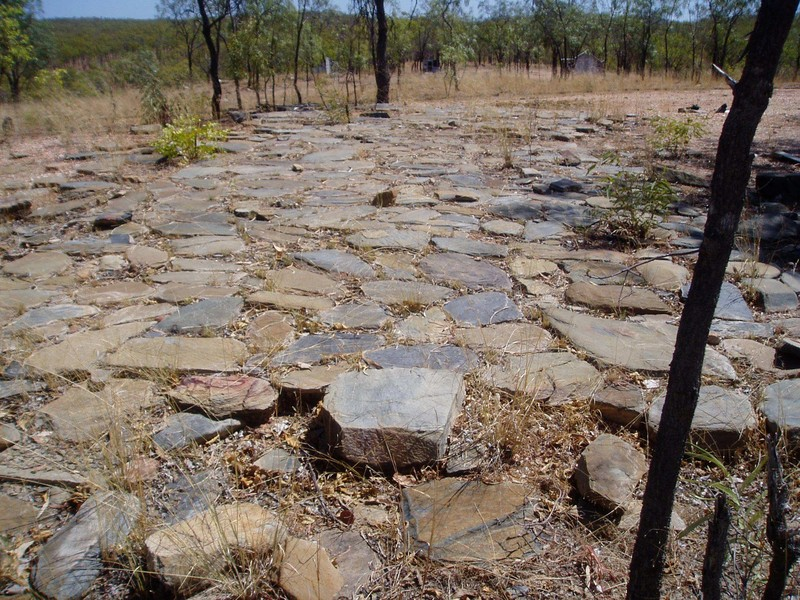
Flagstone flooring, 2003

By the turn of the century the town had a branch of the Queensland Government Savings Bank, a state school, courthouse, school of arts, hospital, police barracks, one hotel, eight stores - four of which were Chinese, a baker, saddler and Miners Institute. In 1900, the town had a population of 674 (252 Europeans and 422 Chinese).

Maytown State School opened circa 1877 in Maytown and closed in 1917. It reopened briefly in 1924, closing in 1925.

By 1924 only Wah Chong and Company's store remained operating. Buildings like the school, which closed in 1925, remained abandoned until World War II in the hope of a mining revival. The town was largely abandoned by 1945.

Today there are only the remains of the baker's oven, stone kerb and channeling along the former Leslie Street, telegraph poles, floor paving, a cemetery with 16 headstones from 1875 to 1986 remaining and in Duff Street a replica hut built by the Palmer River Historical Preservation Society.

== Description ==
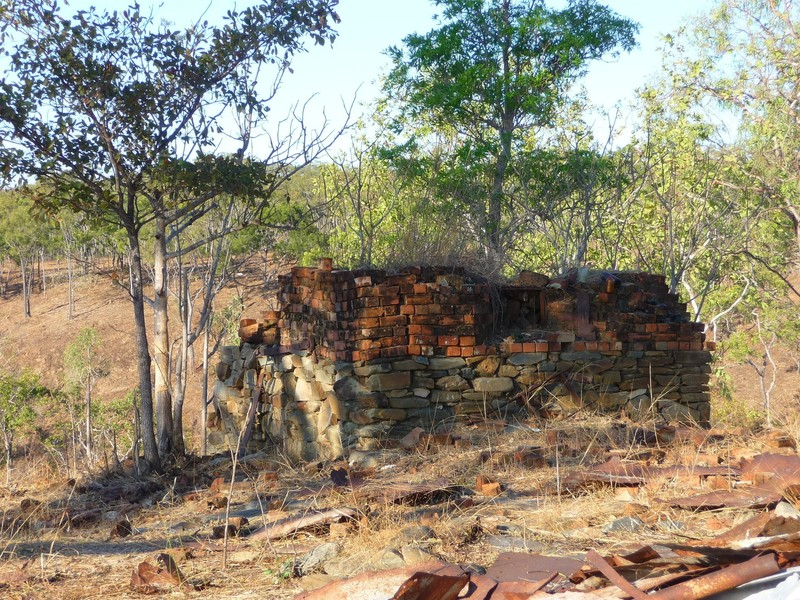
Brick baker's oven, Leslie Street, 2009

The township is located on the north bank of the Palmer River near the junction of Butcher's Creek. The area contains a high concentration of building surfaces and footings. Some street alignments are discernible and one street contains carefully laid stone kerbing and gutters. Dominant structural remains include a brick baker's oven, timber uprights for the school, a Chinese temple site, and burnt timber stumps and corrugated iron sheets of the police station. A stone commemorative cairn and an (inaccurate) replica of a miner's hut have recently been constructed in the centre of the town site. The cemetery contains about 40 identifiable graves including 16 with headstones.

The earliest headstone is dated 1875. The latest headstone is dated 1986 marking Sam Elliott's grave. There is no surviving plant.

== Heritage listing ==
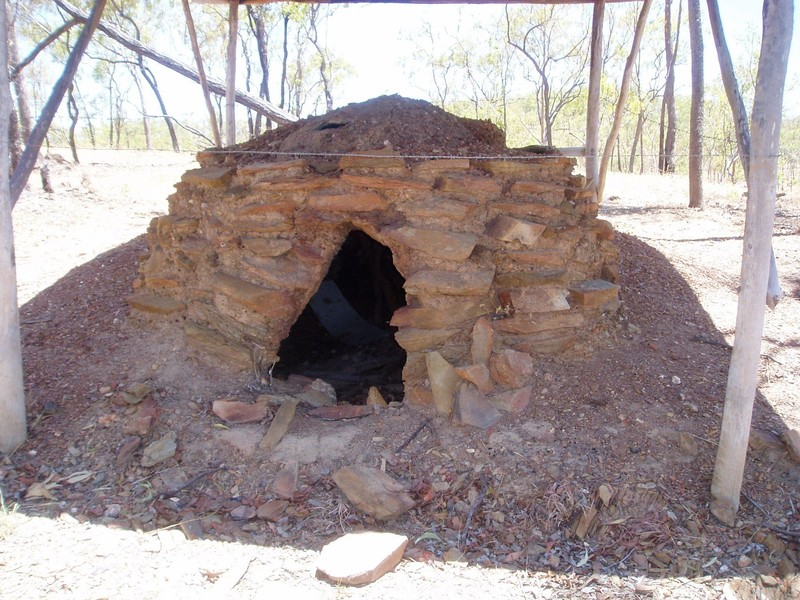
Butcher's Creek oven, 2003

Maytown Township was listed on the Queensland Heritage Register on 1 June 2004 having satisfied the following criteria.

The place is important in demonstrating the evolution or pattern of Queensland's history.

Maytown Township is significant as the major settlement on the Palmer goldfield. Founded beyond the frontier of pastoral occupation, it became an important centre for administration, communications and cultural contact with local Aboriginal people and Chinese miners. The town site contains building footings associated with administration and commerce.

The place demonstrates rare, uncommon or endangered aspects of Queensland's cultural heritage.

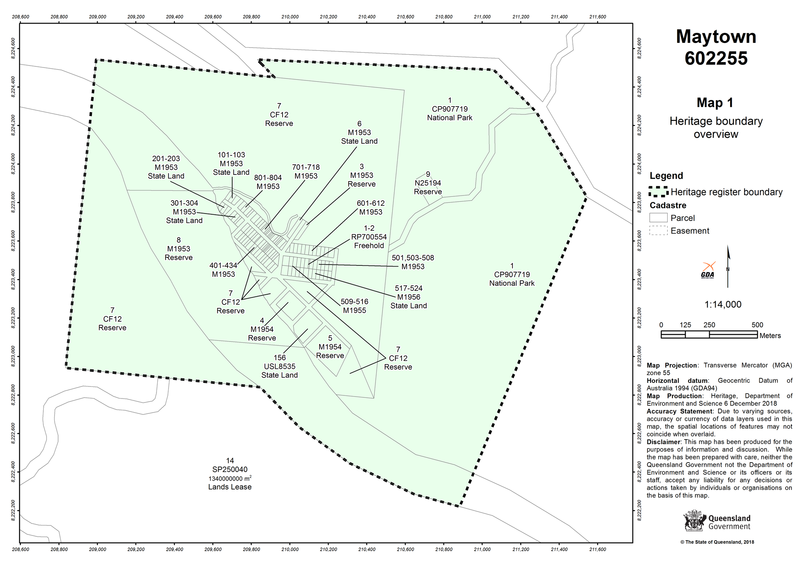
Map of Maytown, showing the extent of the heritage listing

The presence of stone kerb and channelling is rare on far northern goldfields and survives as testimony to the desire for a permanent settlement in the region. Other structural remains are well represented and better documented than at other abandoned mining centres in north Queensland.

The place has potential to yield information that will contribute to an understanding of Queensland's history.

Maytown cemetery is a significant cultural heritage component of the place and contains important historical documentation for the interpretation and understanding of those who lived in the area whilst gold mining operations were thriving along the Palmer River.

The place is important in demonstrating the principal characteristics of a particular class of cultural places.

As the commercial centre for the Palmer River goldfield, Maytown Town Reserve still demonstrates an extensive coverage of historical archaeological remains including campsites, graves, pig ovens and charcoal kilns. The township site and associated places are central to understanding and interpretation of the entire Palmer River goldfield.

== Associated heritage listings ==
In addition, Maytown is associated with other heritage-listed sites from the Palmer goldfields era, including:

- Wild Irish Girl Mine and Battery, Conglomerate Range
- Laura to Maytown Coach Road, Laura to Maytown
- Alexandra Mine and Battery, Palmerville Station

== See also ==
- List of ghost towns
