= Laura, Queensland =

Laura
- Town
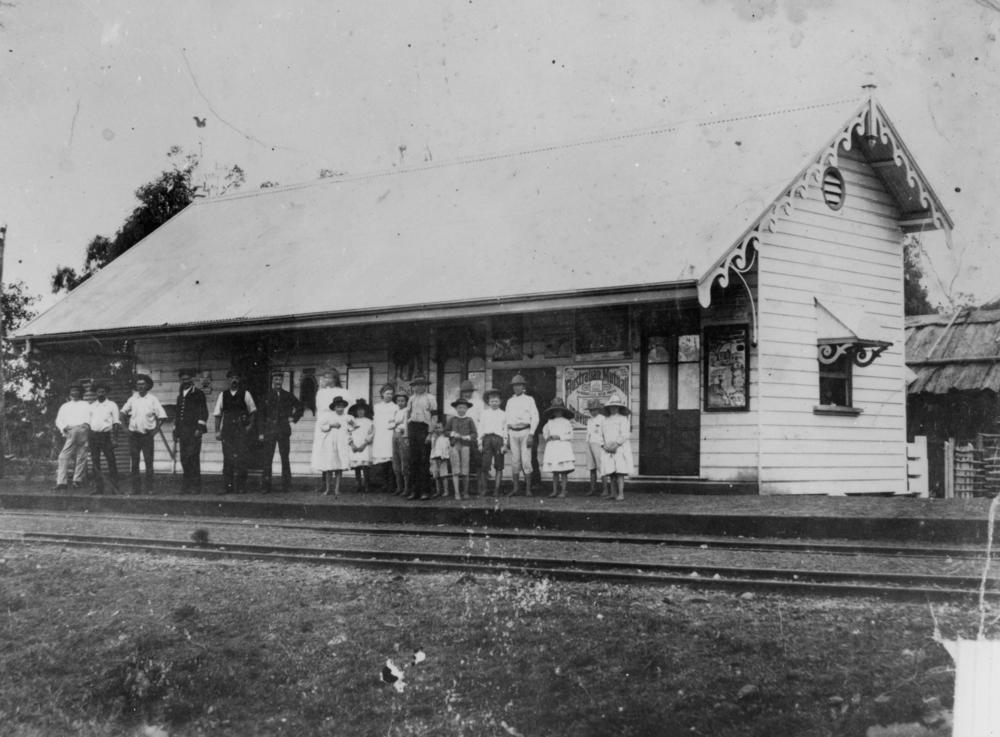
- Laura Railway Station, 1896

- Interactive map of Laura
- Coordinates: 15.5576°S 144.4463°E
- Country: Australia
- State: Queensland
- LGA: Shire of Cook
- Location: 140 km (87 mi) W of Cooktown; 249 km (155 mi) NNW of Mareeba; 310 km (190 mi) NW of Cairns; 1,967 km (1,222 mi) W of Brisbane

Government
  - State electorate: Cook
  - Federal division: Leichhardt

Area
  - Total: 7,757.7 km^{2} (2,995.3 sq mi)

Population
  - Total: 133 (2021 census)
  - Density: 0.01714/km^{2} (0.04440/sq mi)
- Time zone: UTC+10:00 (AEST)
- Postcode: 4871
Localities around Laura
Yarraden	Lakefield	Cooktown
Dixie	Laura	Lakeland
Palmer	Palmer	Lakeland

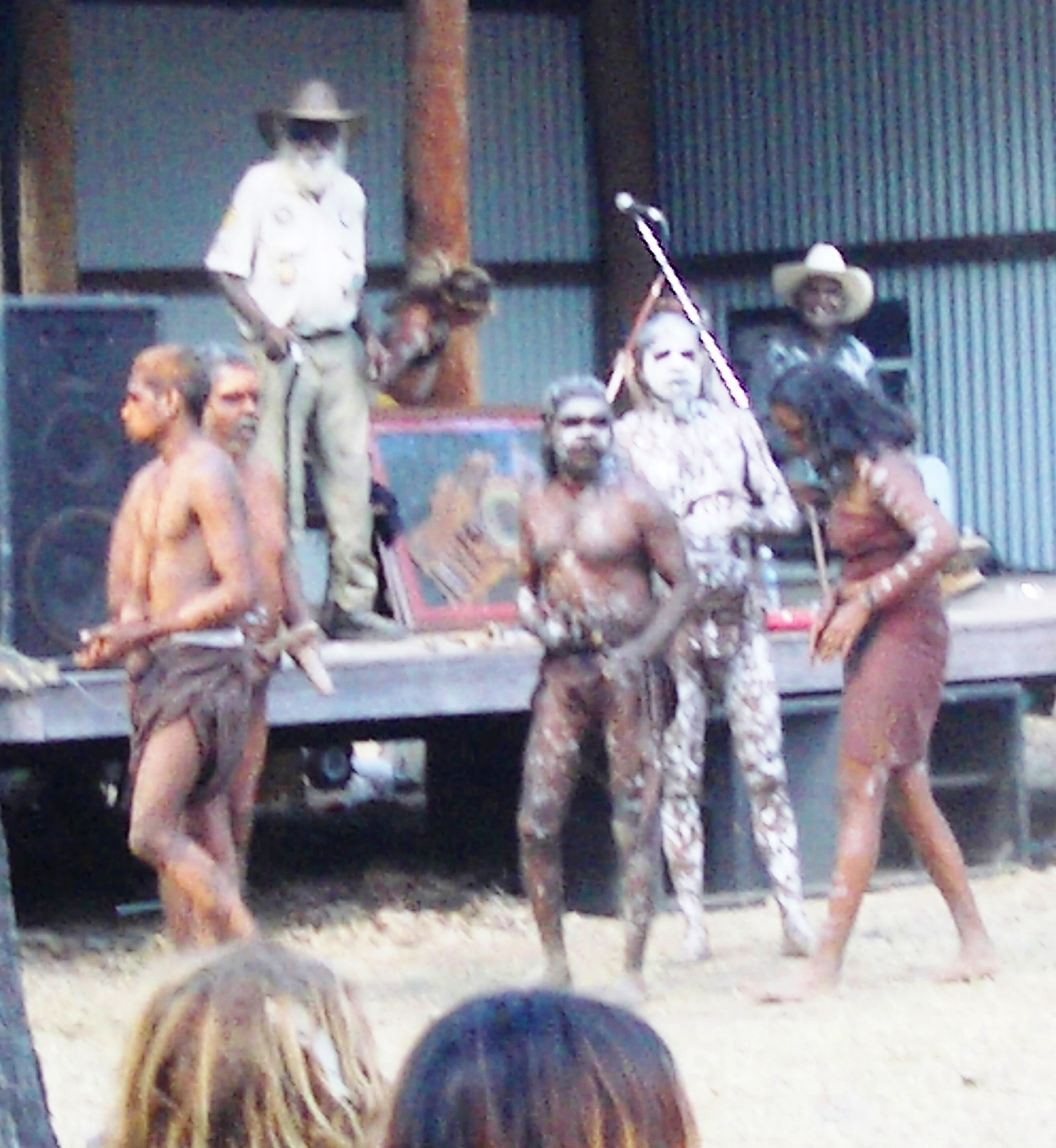
Judges' stand. 1st Laura Dance Festival, June, 2009

Laura is a rural town and locality in the Shire of Cook, Queensland, Australia. It is the centre for the largest collection of prehistoric rock art in the world, including Quinkan Country which is on the Australian National Heritage List. In the 2021 census, the locality of Laura had a population of 133 people.

== Geography ==
The locality of Laura is on Cape York Peninsula in Far North Queensland. The town of Laura is on the Peninsula Developmental Road, the only road that extends towards the north of the peninsula, terminating at Weipa.

Laura is only a few kilometres from the southern entrance to Rinyirru National Park (in neighbouring Lakefield).

Quinkan Reserve 1 (also known as East Quinkan Reserve) is a protected area for the rock art in the south of the locality (15.8166°S 144.4166°E). Quinkan Reserve 2 (also known as West Quinkan Reserve) is a protected area for the rock art in the east of the locality (15.6166°S 144.7166°E).

Apart from the rock art reserves, the land use is predominantly grazing on native vegetation.

== History ==
Aboriginal people have made their home in the Laura River valley for at least 50,000 years. In the wet season, they would camp under rock shelters on the high ground. This is where their rock art can be found. The area was on the borders of Kokowara and Kokojawa lands.

Guugu Yimithirr (also known as Koko Yindjir, Gugu Yimidhirr, Guguyimidjir) is an Australian Aboriginal language of Hope Vale and the Cooktown area. The language region includes the local government area of the Aboriginal Shire of Hope Vale and the Shire of Cook, particularly the localities of Cape Bedford, Battle Camp (in Laura) and sections of the Normanby River and Annan River.

Kuku-Thaypan (also known as Gugu Dhayban, Kuku Taipan, Thaypan) is an Australian Aboriginal language spoken in Hann River, Laura and Musgrave River and on Mornington Island, within the local government boundaries of the Cook Shire.

Some of the earliest pastoral leases on Cape York Peninsula were taken up in the Laura district. However, the town of Laura did not develop until the discovery of gold on the Palmer River.

The town takes its name from the Laura River, which in turn was named in 1873 by explorer and surveyor Archibald Campbell Macmillan after his wife Laura Bower (née Poingdestre).

In 1873 gold was discovered on the Palmer River. Travellers coming from Cooktown to the Palmer Goldfields would cross the Laura River at Laura. This was a very violent period, as local aboriginal clans waged a war of resistance against encroachment on and usurpation of their lands. A Native Mounted Police camp was established near the Lower Laura crossing to protect travellers.

Maytown State School opened circa 1877 and closed in 1917. It reopened in 1924 and closed in 1925.

During the gold boom a railway line was planned between Cooktown and the Palmer gold fields. By 1888 the Cooktown to Laura Railway had been built as far as Laura.

Laura Post Office opened on 8 October 1888.

Laura Provisional School opened on 19 March 1889 and closed in 1903.

The railway was extended towards the Palmer gold fields with an impressive bridge over the Laura River opened, to great fanfare, in 1891. However, since the Palmer gold fields were in decline, a new Queensland Government decided to abandon the project. Only one train ever crossed the bridge - the train that ran on the day that it opened. In 1903 the Queensland Government closed the railway line, but the Cook Shire Council leased it and operated it until 1904 when the Queensland Government decided to continue its operation of the line.

Following the relocation of the Endeavour River No 1 Provisional School building to the town, it reopened on 28 February 1919 as Laura Provisional School, which operated on a part-time basis with Endeavour River No 2 Provisional School and Endeavour River No 3 Provisional School (meaning one teacher was being shared by three schools). However it did not attract any enrolments and so closed on 31 March 1919. The school building was moved again and reopened as Flaggy Provisional School in conjunction with Endeavour River No 2 and No 3 schools.

The rail line contributed to the growth of Laura. It was used by miners and by peninsula cattle properties. The railway finally closed in 1961.

It was during the 1960s that Quinkan rock art galleries were reported by Percy Trezise, an airline pilot who surveyed the area from the air for likely sites and later walked in to rediscover them.

The current Laura State School opened on 31 January 1968.

This Laura Quinkan Dance Festival began in the early 1980s.

In January 2026, the Laura River experienced significant flooding following intense monsoonal rainfall and saturated catchments. The low-level crossing was submerged, forcing authorities to close the road to all traffic. Rising floodwaters swept away at least one vehicle. The occupants escaped unharmed, his pets remained trapped in the car.

== Demographics ==
In the 2006 census, the locality of Laura and the surrounding area had a population of 225 people.

In the 2011 census, the locality of Laura had a population of 80 people.

In the 2016 census, the locality of Laura had a population of 228 people.

In the 2021 census, the locality of Laura had a population of 133 people.

== Heritage listings ==
Laura has a number of heritage-listed sites, including:

- Laura to Maytown Coach Road, Laura to Maytown
- Quinkan Country, Peninsula Developmental Road

== Education ==
Laura State School is a government primary (Early Childhood to Year 6) school for boys and girls in Terminus Street (15.5575°S 144.4469°E). In 2018, the school had an enrolment of 7 students with 2 teachers and 6 non-teaching staff (2 full-time equivalent). In 2023, the school had an enrolment of 24 students.

There are no secondary schools in Laura. The nearest government secondary school is Cooktown State School (to Year 12) in neighbouring Cooktown to the east. However, only some parts of the locality are sufficiently close to enable students to commute to school in Cooktown; distance education and boarding schools are the alternatives.

== Attractions ==
Some of the world's most extensive and ancient rock painting galleries surround the town of Laura, some of which are available for public viewing. Laura has an Interpretive Centre from which information on the rock art and local Aboriginal culture is available and tours can be arranged.

It also forms the northern apex of the "Scenic Triangle" between Cooktown, Lakeland, and Laura.

== Events ==
The Ang-Gnarra Aboriginal Corporation is the trustee of the traditional land situated in and around the township of Laura on Cape York Peninsula, who host the Laura Quinkan Dance Festival. A biennial, three day event for communities gathering to celebrate traditional Indigenous music, dance, crafts and stories. It is known as one of the longest running Aboriginal cultural festival in Australia. In 2009, Tom George, an elder of the Kuku Thaypan clan, presented his history and role in establishing the Laura Dance Festival, the traditional weaving exchange occurred at the Laura festival by the Erub Island and Hope Vale communities.
