= Kimberley, Queensland =

Kimberley
- Suburb
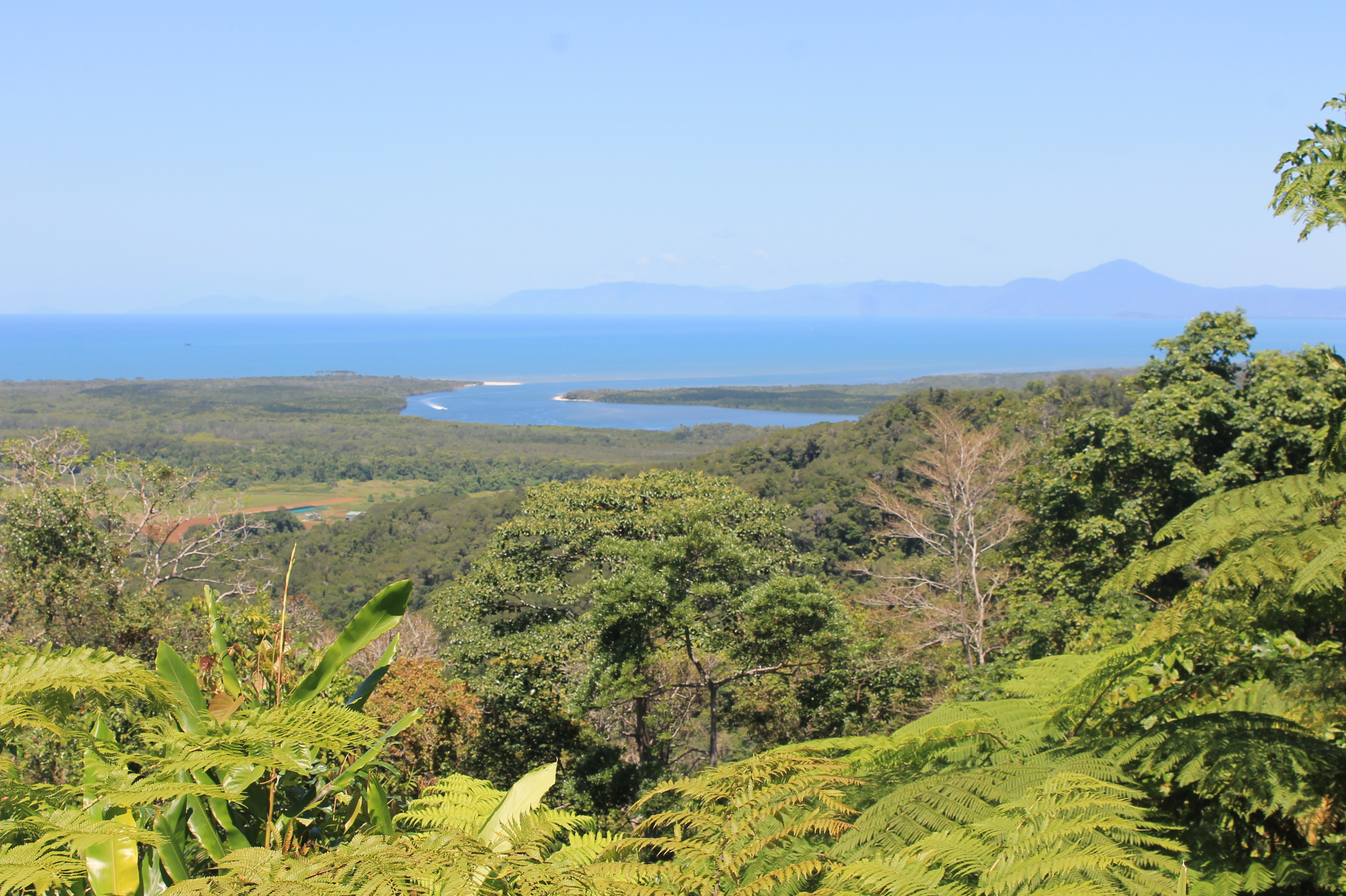
- View from the Walu Wugirriga Lookout to the mouth of the Daintree River

- Interactive map of Kimberley
- Coordinates: 16.2747°S 145.4575°E
- Country: Australia
- State: Queensland
- LGA: Shire of Douglas
- Location: 18.8 km (11.7 mi) E of Daintree; 34.5 km (21.4 mi) NNE of Mossman; 110 km (68 mi) NNW of Cairns; 1,898 km (1,179 mi) NNW of Brisbane

Government
  - State electorate: Cook
  - Federal division: Leichhardt

Area
  - Total: 58.3 km^{2} (22.5 sq mi)

Population
  - Total: 28 (2021 census)
  - Density: 0.480/km^{2} (1.244/sq mi)
- Time zone: UTC+10:00 (AEST)
- Postcode: 4873
Suburbs around Kimberley
Cow Bay	Cow Bay	Cow Bay
Forest Creek	Kimberley	Coral Sea
Lower Daintree	Lower Daintree	Coral Sea

Kimberley is a coastal locality in the Shire of Douglas, Queensland, Australia. In the 2021 census, Kimberley had a population of 28 people.

== Geography ==
The locality is bounded to the south by the Daintree River and to the south-east, east, and north-east by the Coral Sea.

Cape Tribulation Road enters the locality from the west (Forest Creek) and meanders through the centre of the locality and then exits to the north-west (Cow Bay).

Much of the locality is within the Daintree National Park. Other land uses includes grazing on native vegetation and horticulture.

The locality has a number of coastal and off-shore features (from north to south):

- Cow Bay, a side bay of Trinity Bay, named after the dugongs (also known as sea cows) which inhabit the bay (16.2360°S 145.4731°E)
- Cape Kimberley, named after the first Earl of Kimberley who was Secretary of State for the Colonies from 1870 to 1874 and from 1880 1882 (16.2773°S 145.4876°E)
- Penguin Channel, probably named after HMS Penguin which did Great Barrier Reef hydrographic surveys in the late 1800s (16.2843°S 145.4876°E)
- Halls Point (also known as Hells Point) (16.2895°S 145.4586°E)
- Snapper Island, a 59-hectare (150-acre) marine island (16.2974°S 145.4988°E)

== History ==
The locality takes its name from Cape Kimberley, which in turn was named on 24 October 1873 after John Wodehouse, First Earl of Kimberley (Secretary of State for the Colonies) by explorer George Elphinstone Dalrymple.

The town of Kimberley was surveyed in December 1886 and later renamed the town of Whitby, after the town in England from which James Cook set sail in HMS Endeavour. The town was abandoned in the late 1800s. It was located on the northern bank of the Daintree River (16.27306°S 145.44417°E).

== Demographics ==
In the 2016 census, Kimberley had a population of 33 people.

In the 2021 census, Kimberley had a population of 28 people.

== Education ==
There are no schools in Kimberley. The nearest government primary school is Alexandra Bay State School in Diwan to the north. The nearest government secondary school is Mossman State High School in Mossman to the south. There is also a Catholic primary school in Mossman.

== Attractions ==
Walu Wugirriga Lookout (also known as Mount Alexandra Lookout) is on Cape Tribulation Road (16.2458°S 145.4362°E). It provides views across the mouth of the Daintree River and beyond to Snapper Island and the Low Isles.
