= Bamboo, Queensland =

Bamboo
- Suburb
- Interactive map of Bamboo
- Coordinates: 16.3547°S 145.3916°E
- Country: Australia
- State: Queensland
- LGA: Shire of Douglas
- Location: 11.5 km (7.1 mi) N of Mossman; 90.9 km (56.5 mi) NW of Cairns; 1,682 km (1,045 mi) NNW of Brisbane

Government
  - State electorate: Cook
  - Federal division: Leichhardt

Area
  - Total: 20.5 km^{2} (7.9 sq mi)

Population
  - Total: 139 (2021 census)
  - Density: 6.78/km^{2} (17.56/sq mi)
- Time zone: UTC+10:00 (AEST)
- Postcode: 4873
Suburbs around Bamboo
Whyanbeel	Whyanbeel	Wonga Beach
Whyanbeel	Bamboo	Wonga Beach
Whyanbeel	Miallo	Rocky Point

Bamboo is a rural locality in the Shire of Douglas, Queensland, Australia. In the 2021 census, Bamboo had a population of 139 people.

== Geography ==
The southern boundary of the locality loosely follows Whyanbeel Creek and then Saltwater Creek, while ultimately flows into the Coral Sea at Rocky Point / Newell.

The Mossman Daintree Road forms part of south-east boundary of the locality and is the only road access to the locality. Bamboo Creek Road commences at the Mossman Daintree Road and is the main road route through the locality, terminating in the centre north of the locality.

The north and east of the locality are within the Daintree National Park, part of the Wet Tropics of Queensland world heritage site. Apart from this protected area, the land use is predominantly crop growing (mostly sugarcane) with some grazing on native vegetation and rural residential housing.

== Demographics ==
In the 2016 census, Bamboo had a population of 129 people.

In the 2021 census, Bamboo had a population of 139 people.

== Education ==
There are no schools in Bamboo. The nearest government primary schools are Miallo State School in neighbouring Miallo to the south and Wonga Beach State School in neighbouring Wonga Beach to the east. The nearest government secondary school is Mossman State High School in Mossman to the south.
