= Forest Creek, Queensland =

Forest Creek
- Suburb
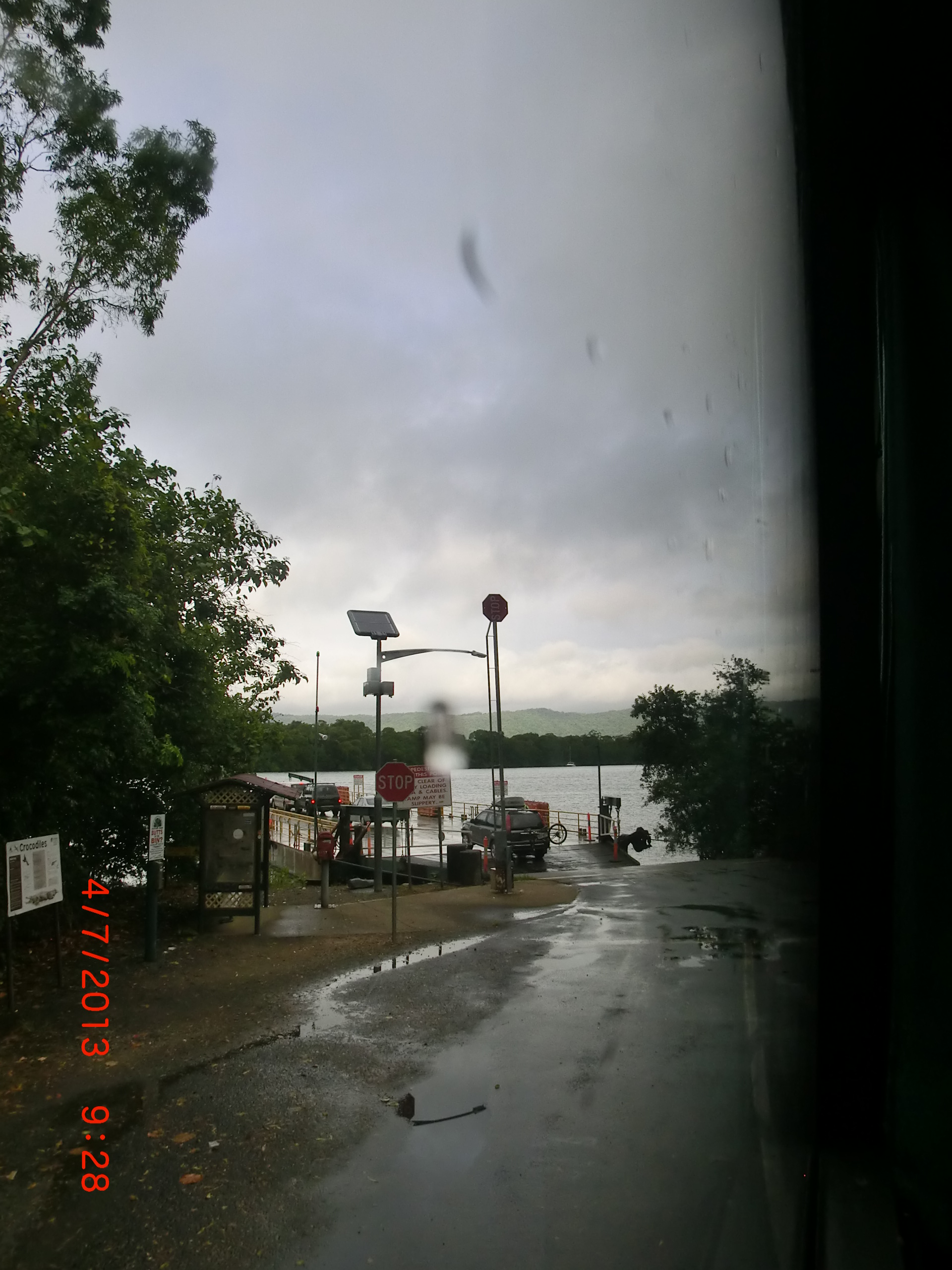
- Approaching the Daintree River Ferry

- Interactive map of Forest Creek
- Coordinates: 16.2411°S 145.3666°E
- Country: Australia
- State: Queensland
- LGA: Shire of Douglas
- Location: 31.9 km (19.8 mi) N of Mossman; 107 km (66 mi) NNW of Cairns; 138 km (86 mi) S of Cooktown (4WD); 1,805 km (1,122 mi) NNW of Brisbane

Government
  - State electorate: Cook
  - Federal division: Leichhardt

Area
  - Total: 22.9 km^{2} (8.8 sq mi)
- Elevation: 0–170 m (0–558 ft)

Population
  - Total: 136 (2021 census)
  - Density: 5.94/km^{2} (15.38/sq mi)
- Time zone: UTC+10:00 (AEST)
- Postcode: 4873
Suburbs around Forest Creek
Noah	Noah	Cow Bay
Upper Daintree	Forest Creek	Kimberley
Daintree	Lower Daintree	Lower Daintree

Forest Creek is a locality in the Shire of Douglas, Queensland, Australia. In the 2021 census, Forest Creek had a population of 136 people.

== Geography ==
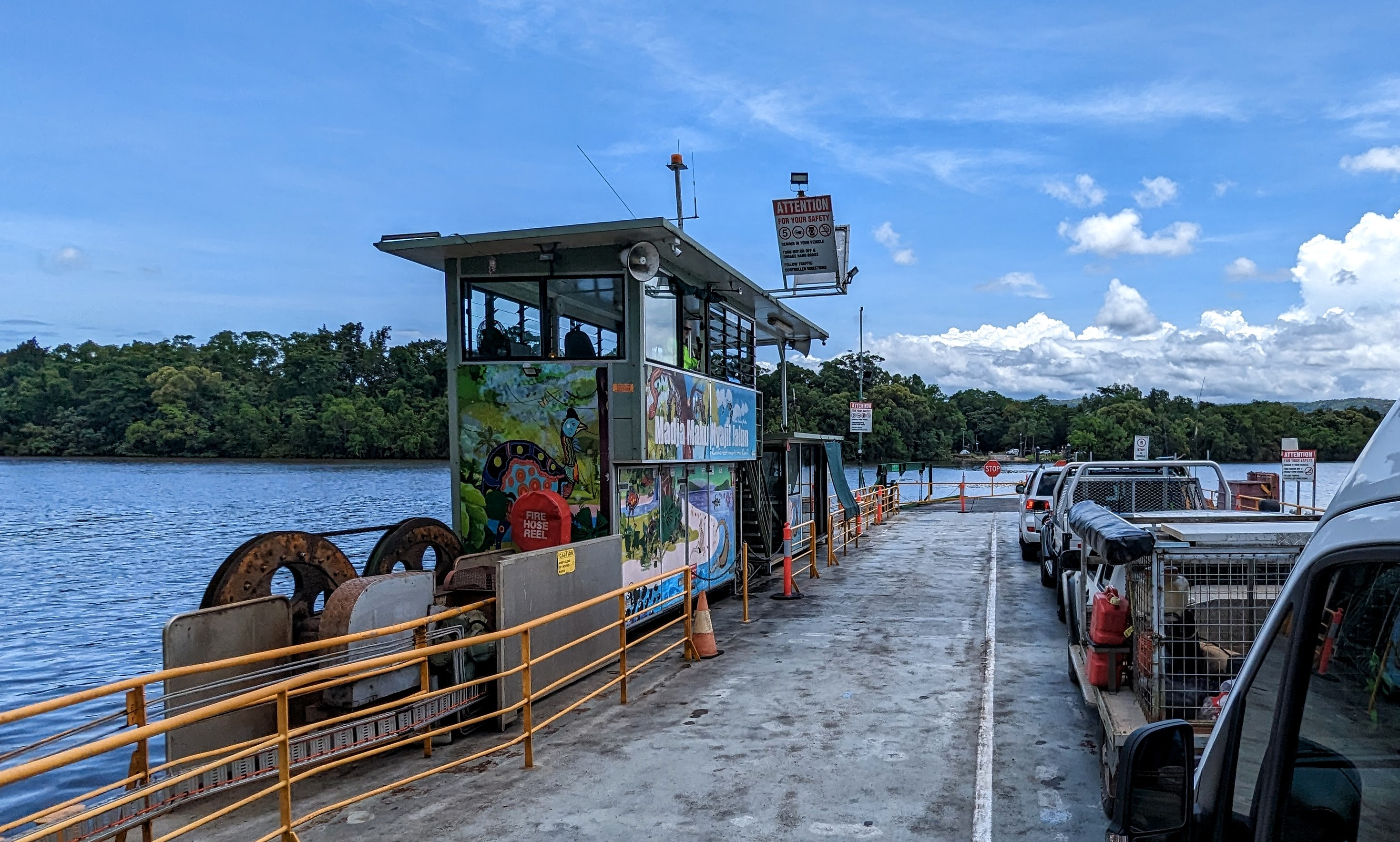
Daintree River Ferry on the Forest Creek side

The Daintree River forms the southern boundary of the locality. The watercourse Forest Creek flows through the locality, becoming a tributary of the Daintree River (16.2581°S 145.3977°E).

The Daintree River Ferry carries vehicles from Cape Tribulation Road in Lower Daintree across the Daintree River to Cape Tribulation Road in Forest Creek (16.25856°S 145.39885°E).

The locality contains two section of the Daintree National Park in the south-east of the locality and in the east.

Virgil Island 35.2999-hectare (87.228-acre) island in the Daintree River in the south of the locality (16.2517°S 145.3649°E). It is separated from the mainland by the narrow Brandy and Water Creek (16.25°S 145.3666°E).

Apart from the protected areas, the eastern part of the locality are predominantly used for rural residential purposes, while the western part of the locality are predominantly used for grazing on native vegetation.

== History ==
The locality was named on 17 March 1984; it takes its name from the creek.

== Demographics ==
In the 2016 census, Forest Creek had a population of 103 people.

In the 2021 census, Forest Creek had a population of 136 people.

== Education ==
There are no schools in Forest Creek. The nearest government primary schools are Alexandra Bay State School in Diwan to the north-east and Daintree State School in neighbouring Daintree to the south-west (the latter requiring a ferry crossing). The nearest government secondary school is Mossman State High School in Mossman to the south (requiring a ferry crossing).
