= Rocky Point, Queensland =

Rocky Point, Queensland may refer to:

- Rocky Point, Queensland (Douglas Shire)
- Rocky Point, Queensland (Weipa Town)
