= Whyanbeel =

- Suburb
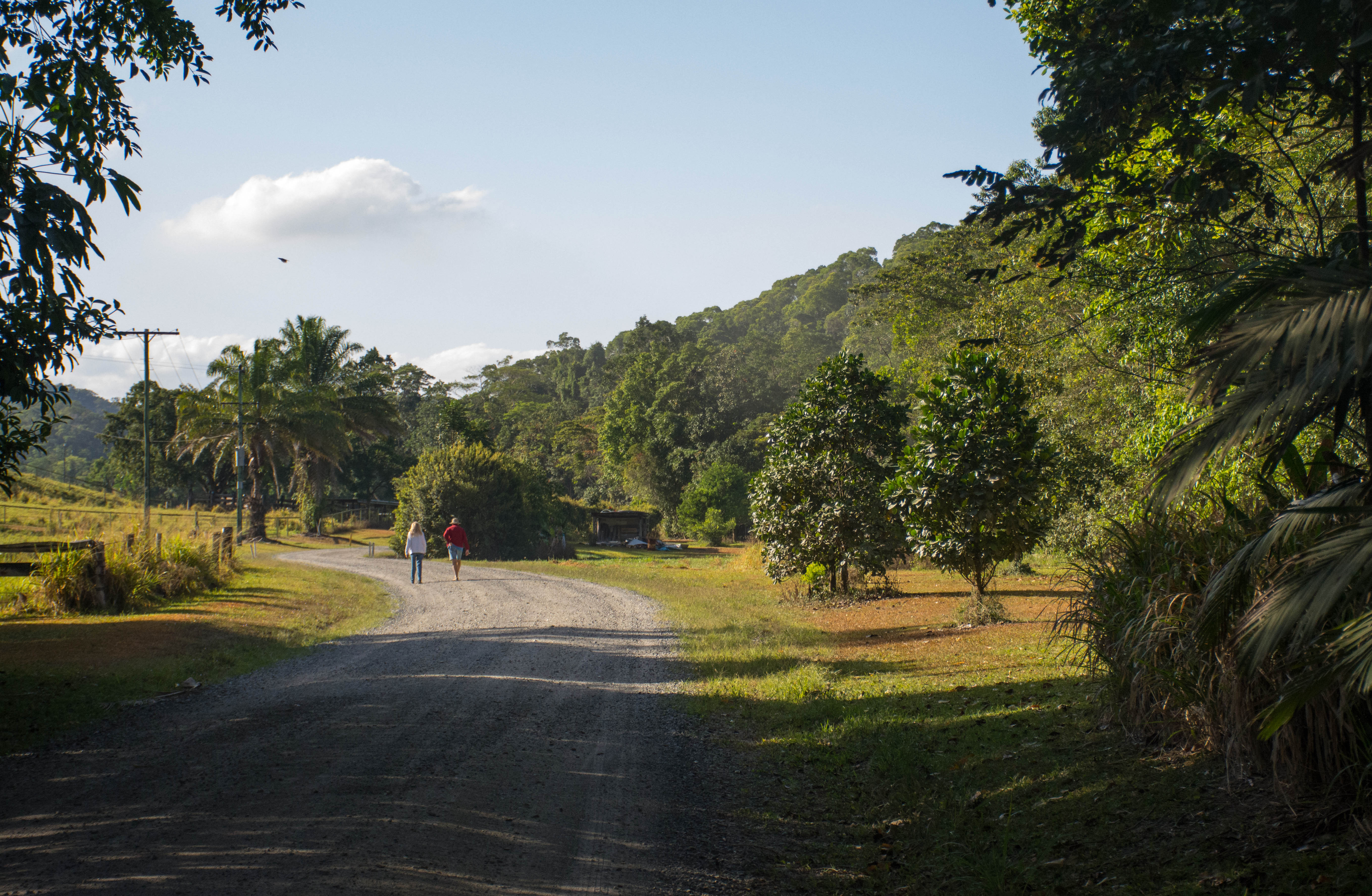
- Whyanbeel Road

- Interactive map of Whyanbeel
- Coordinates: 16.35°S 145.3544°E
- Country: Australia
- State: Queensland
- LGA: Shire of Douglas
- Location: 14.9 km (9.3 mi) NNW of Mossman; 34.8 km (21.6 mi) NW of Port Douglas; 92.0 km (57.2 mi) NW of Cairns; 1,793 km (1,114 mi) NW of Brisbane

Government
  - State electorate: Cook
  - Federal division: Leichhardt

Area
  - Total: 55.1 km^{2} (21.3 sq mi)

Population
  - Total: 172 (2021 census)
  - Density: 3.122/km^{2} (8.085/sq mi)
- Time zone: UTC+10:00 (AEST)
- Postcode: 4873
Suburbs around Whyanbeel
Stewart Creek Valley	Lower Daintree	Wonga Beach
Dedin	Whyanbeel	Bamboo
Syndicate	Miallo	Miallo

Whyanbeel is a rural locality in the Shire of Douglas, Queensland, Australia. In the 2021 census, Whyanbeel had a population of 172 people.

== Geography ==
The terrain varies from 10 to 337 metres (33 to 1,106 ft) above sea level. Most of the locality (particularly in the north) is undeveloped heavily forested mountainous land with elevations of typically 200 metres (660 ft) above sea level with the highest peak, the Pinnacle at 337 metres (1,106 ft) at 16.3263°S 145.3565°E.

All of the north of the locality and most of the centre is within the Daintree National Park. The remaining land is low-lying at approximately 20 metres (66 ft) and the predominant land use is farming sugarcane and tropical fruit. The southern areas are watered by Whyanbeel Creek and its tributary Chinaman Creek. In the farming land there are cane tramways to transport the harvested sugarcane to the Mossman Sugar Mill.

== History ==
The name Whyanbeel means canoe in an Aboriginal language (possibly Yindinyji) and was recorded on 6 December 1873 by explorer George Elphinstone Dalrymple.

== Demographics ==
In the 2016 census, Whyanbeel had a population of 160 people.

In the 2021 census, Whyanbeel had a population of 172 people.

== Education ==
There are no schools in Whyanbeel. The nearest government primary school is Miallo State School in neighbouring Miallo to the south. The nearest government secondary school is Mossman State High School in Mossman to the south.
