= Lower Daintree, Queensland =

Lower Daintree
- Suburb
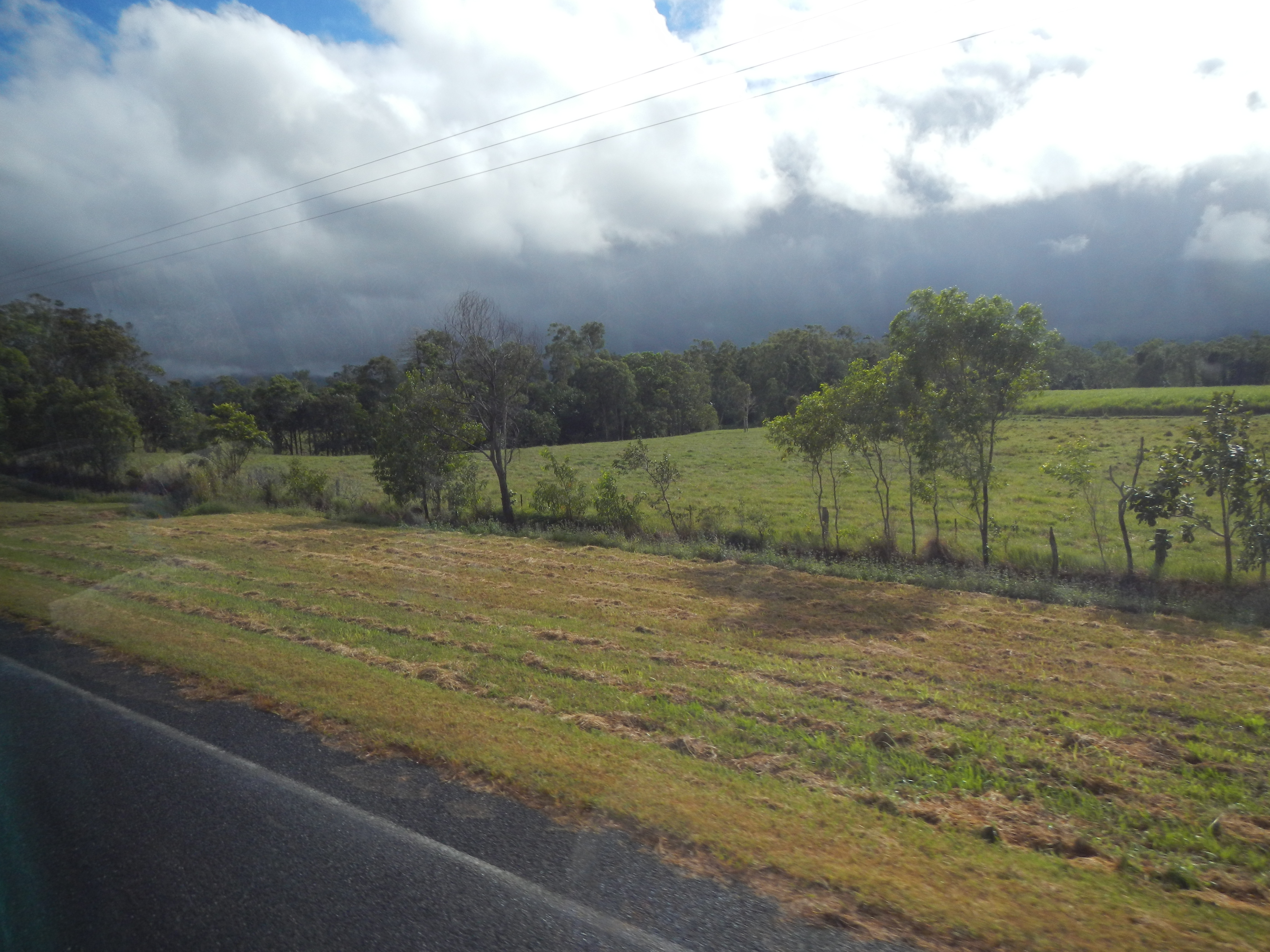
- Lower Daintree landscape

- Interactive map of Lower Daintree
- Coordinates: 16.28°S 145.3911°E
- Country: Australia
- State: Queensland
- LGA: Shire of Douglas
- Location: 25.6 km (15.9 mi) N of Mossman; 101 km (63 mi) NW of Cairns; 141 km (88 mi) S of Cooktown (4WD); 1,798 km (1,117 mi) NNW of Brisbane

Government
  - State electorate: Cook
  - Federal division: Leichhardt

Area
  - Total: 66.6 km^{2} (25.7 sq mi)

Population
  - Total: 83 (2021 census)
  - Density: 1.246/km^{2} (3.228/sq mi)
- Time zone: UTC+10:00 (AEST)
- Postcode: 4873
Suburbs around Lower Daintree
Daintree	Forest Creek	Kimberley
Stewart Creek Valley	Lower Daintree	Coral Sea
Whyanbeel	Whyanbeel	Wonga Beach

Lower Daintree is a coastal rural locality in the Shire of Douglas, Queensland, Australia. In the 2021 census, Lower Daintree had a population of 83 people.

== Geography ==
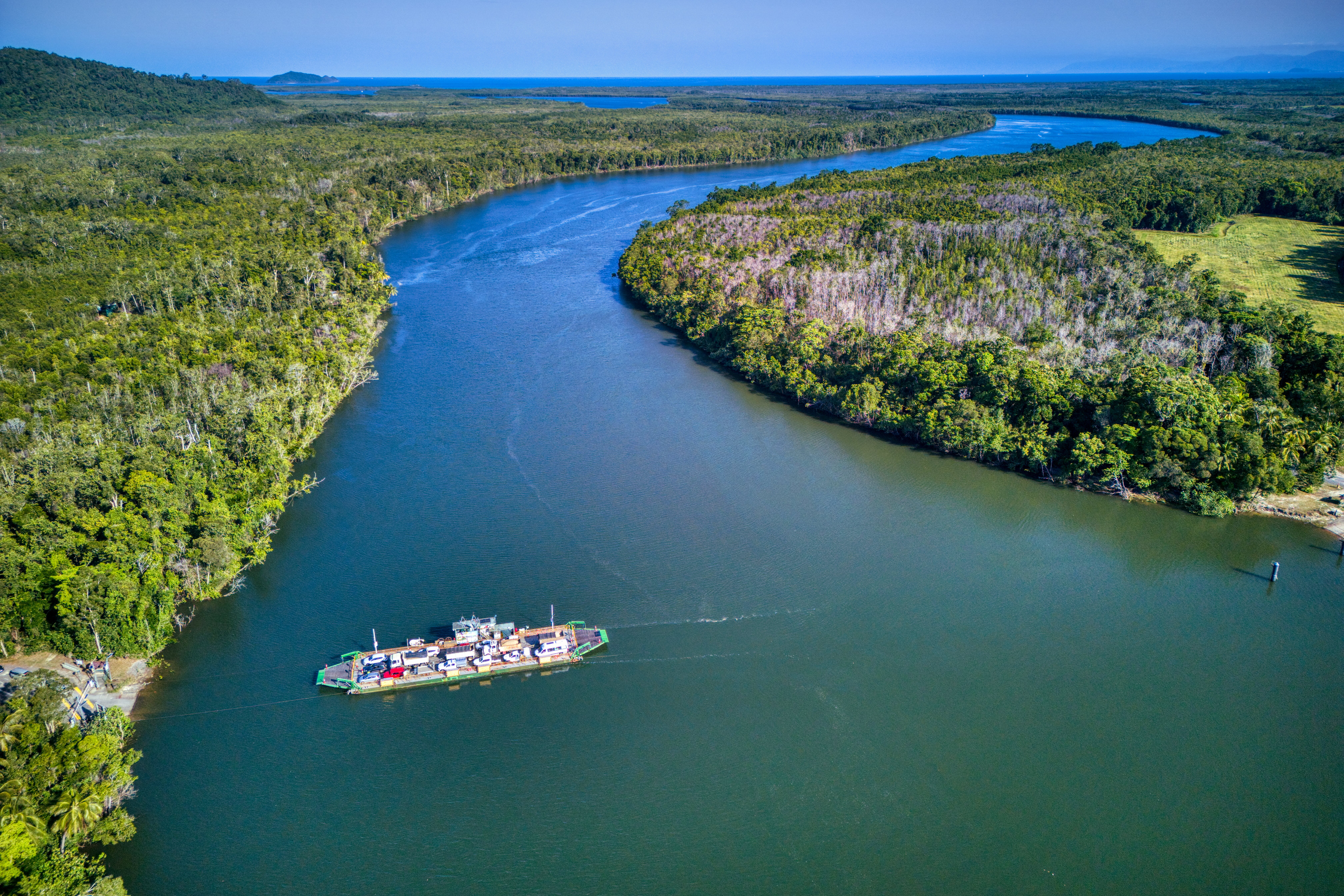
Daintree River Ferry on the Daintree River

The Daintree River (16.2890°S 145.4524°E) forms the northern boundary, and Trinity Bay in the Coral Sea the eastern.

The western part of the locality is within the Daintree National Park (16.2828°S 145.3502°E), while the eastern part is a nationally important wetland (16.2949°S 145.4194°E). The land in between is used for crop growing, predominately sugarcane.

The Mossman Daintree Road runs through from south to north-west.

The Daintree River Ferry carries vehicles from Cape Tribulation Road in Lower Daintree (16.26087°S 145.39761°E) across the Daintree River to Cape Tribulation Road in Forest Creek.

== History ==
The Daintree River was named by explorer George Elphinstone Dalrymple after geologist Richard Daintree. T

The locality was named and bounded on 8 September 2000. The locality's name reflects its proximity to the lower reaches of the river.

== Demographics ==
In the 2016 census, Lower Daintree had a population of 98 people.

In the 2021 census, Lower Daintree had a population of 83 people.

== Education ==
There are no schools in Lower Daintree. The nearest government primary schools are Daintree State School in neighbouring Daintree to the north-west and Wonga Beach State School in neighbouring Wonga Beach to the south-east. The nearest government secondary school is Mossman State High School in Mossman to the south.

== Amenities ==
There is a boat ramp with pontoon and floating walkway at Cape Tribulation Road on the south bank of Daintree River (16.2616°S 145.3933°E). It is managed by the Douglas Shire Council.

== Attractions ==
The Daintree River Cruise Centre is at 2914 Mossman Daintree Road (16.2548°S 145.3609°E). It offers eco-cruises through the mangroves of the river where birds, fish, and crocodiles can be spotted.
