= Thornton Beach, Queensland =

Thornton Beach
- Town
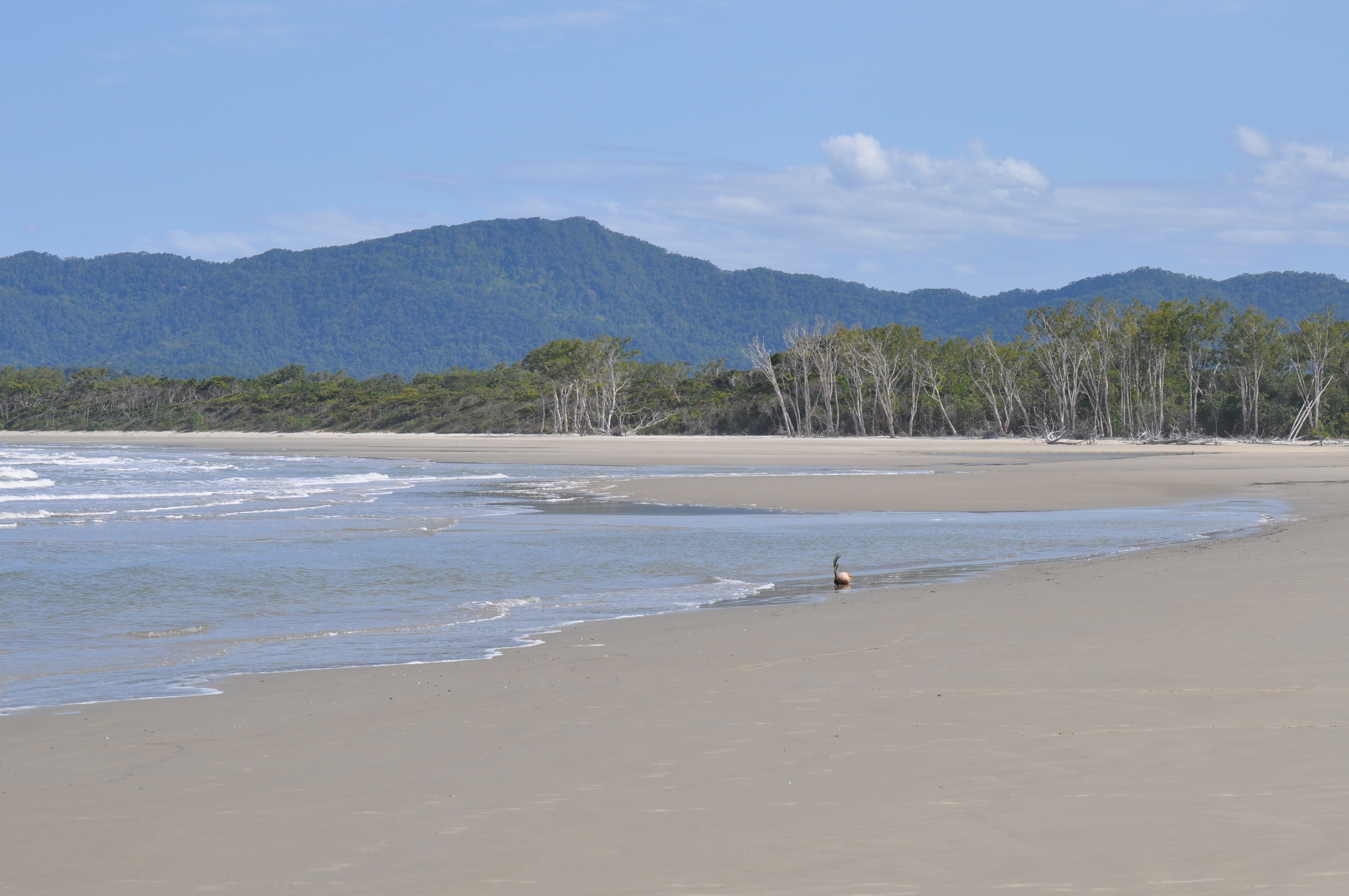
- Thornton Beach, 2011

- Interactive map of Thornton Beach
- Coordinates: 16.1723°S 145.4405°E
- Country: Australia
- State: Queensland
- LGA: Shire of Douglas
- Location: 35.5 km (22.1 mi) NW of Daintree; 51.2 km (31.8 mi) N of Mossman; 126 km (78 mi) NNW of Cairns; 1,824 km (1,133 mi) NNW of Brisbane

Government
  - State electorate: Cook
  - Federal division: Leichhardt

Area
  - Total: 14.2 km^{2} (5.5 sq mi)

Population
  - Total: 8 (2021 census)
  - Density: 0.56/km^{2} (1.46/sq mi)
- Time zone: UTC+10:00 (AEST)
- Postcode: 4873
Localities around Thornton Beach
Cape Tribulation	Cape Tribulation	Cape Tribulation
Noah	Thornton Beach	Coral Sea
Diwan	Diwan	Coral Sea

Thornton Beach is a coastal town and locality in the Shire of Douglas, Queensland, Australia. In the 2021 census, the locality of Thornton Beach had a population of 8 people.

== Geography ==
Thornton Beach is bounded to the south by the Cape Tribulation Road and to the east by the Coral Sea. The wide, flat beach has a tide which, at its highest point, almost reached the trees. Most of the southern and western parts of the locality are within the Daintree National Park. Cape Tribulation Road connects from Diwan to the south through to Cape Tribulation to the north and passes through the town.

== History ==
Thornton Beach was named as a town on 1 February 1972.

On 29 May 2016, a 46-year-old woman visiting from New South Wales was attacked by a crocodile while swimming at the beach with her friend, who attempted unsuccessfully to rescue her before she was taken. Police conducted a search of the coastline and surrounding estuaries, and the woman was later confirmed to be dead. The attack sparked conversations of crocodile population culling in the area, initiated by federal MP Bob Katter.

In the 2016 census, the locality of Thornton Beach had a population of 5 people.

In the 2021 census, the locality of Thornton Beach had a population of 8 people.

== Education ==
There are no schools in Thornton Beach. The nearest government primary school is Alexandra Bay State School in neighbouring Diwan to the south. The nearest government secondary school is Mossman State High School in Mossman to the south.
