= Wonga Beach, Queensland =

Wonga Beach
- Suburb
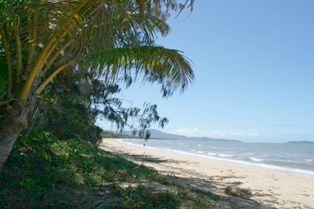

- Interactive map of Wonga Beach
- Coordinates: 16.3338°S 145.4161°E
- Country: Australia
- State: Queensland
- LGA: Shire of Douglas
- Location: 16.8 km (10.4 mi) SE of Daintree; 18.7 km (11.6 mi) NNE of Mossman; 93.9 km (58.3 mi) NNW of Cairns; 1,786 km (1,110 mi) NNW of Brisbane

Government
  - State electorate: Cook
  - Federal division: Leichhardt

Area
  - Total: 21.4 km^{2} (8.3 sq mi)

Population
  - Total: 1,042 (2021 census)
  - Density: 48.69/km^{2} (126.1/sq mi)
- Time zone: UTC+10:00 (AEST)
- Postcode: 4873
Suburbs around Wonga Beach
Whyanbeel	Lower Daintree	Lower Daintree
Bamboo	Wonga Beach	Coral Sea
Bamboo	Rocky Point	Coral Sea

Wonga Beach is a coastal locality in the Shire of Douglas, Queensland, Australia. The town of Wonga is within the locality. In the 2021 census, Wonga Beach had a population of 1,042 people.

== Geography ==
Wonga Beach is a beachside locality situated between the small residential towns of Rocky Point and the Daintree township. It is approximately 17 kilometres (11 mi) north of the town of Mossman. In 1985, a large volcanic eruption beneath the Coral Sea released thousands of pumice stones to the ocean surface which were then blown along north Queensland's shore by the trade winds.

== History ==
Rocky Point State School opened on 23 February 1939, about 4 kilometres (2.5 mi) south of the current school at Rocky Point. In 1999, the school was relocated to Wonga Beach and renamed Wonga Beach State School. Most of the Rocky Point school buildings were sold for housing, but one was relocated to Wonga Beach.

== Demographics ==
In the 2011 census, Wonga Beach had a population of 746 people.

In the 2016 census, Wonga Beach had a population of 975 people.

In the 2021 census, Wonga Beach had a population of 1,042 people.

== Fauna ==
Birdwatchers visit Wonga Beach to see three uncommon bird species: Gould's bronze cuckoo, double-eyed fig-parrot and the beach stone-curlew. The last species is easily confused with the ubiquitous bush stone-curlew noted for its wailing calls at night.

== Services ==
A service station is the only fuel outlet in the Daintree Valley and opens early (5:30am) and closes at 8:30pm. In addition to automotive fuels, the service station incorporates a small convenience store with an ATM.

== Education ==
Wonga Beach State School is a government primary (Prep-6) school for boys and girls at 48-74 Snapper Island Drive (16.3419°S 145.4129°E). In 2017, the school had an enrolment of 90 students with 10 teachers (6 full-time equivalent) and 7 non-teaching staff (4 full-time equivalent).

There are no secondary schools in Wonga Beach. The nearest government secondary school is Mossman State High School in Mossman to the south-west.
