= Daintree River Ferry =

Cable ferry across the Daintree River

Coordinates: 16.259854°S 145.398195°E

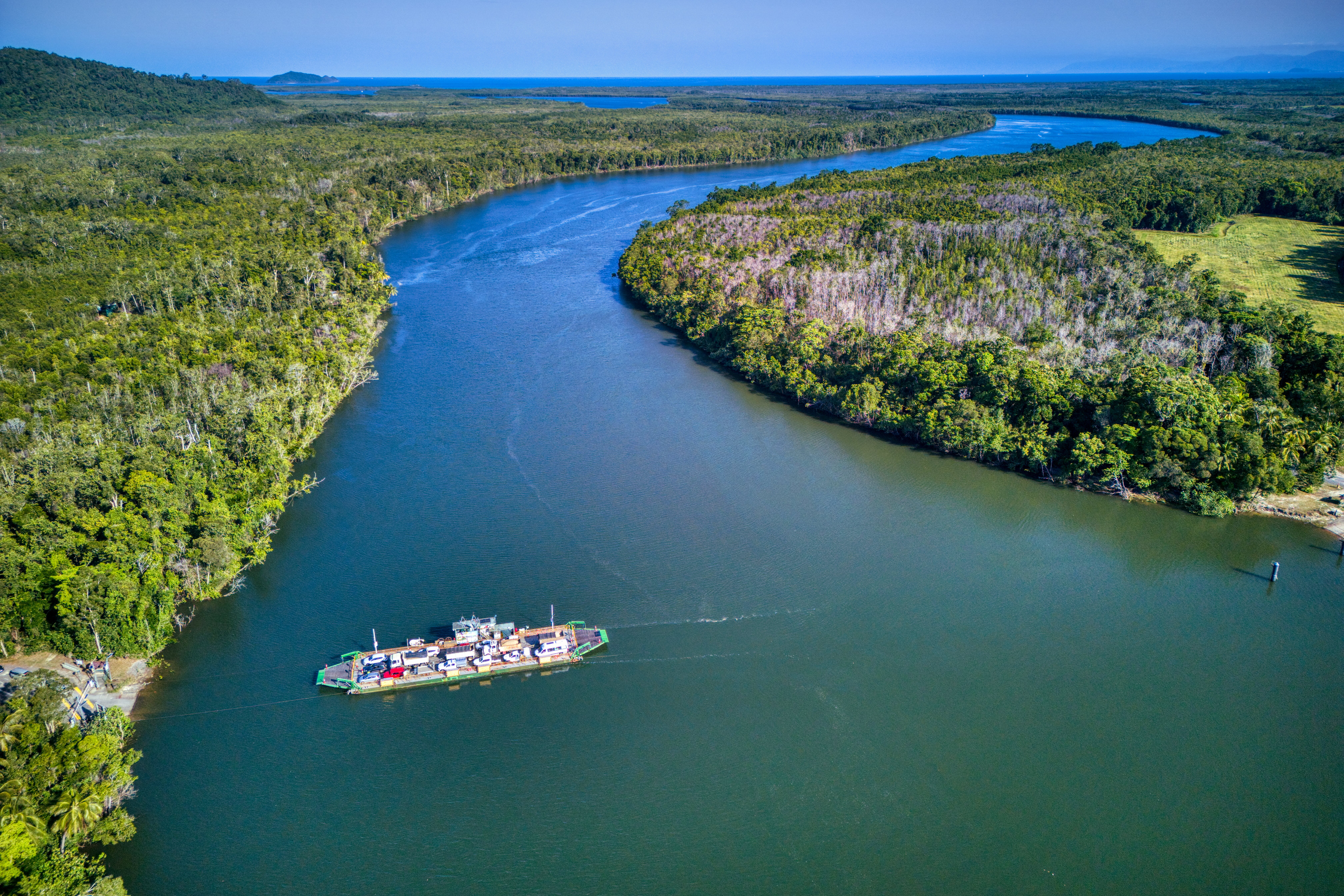
Daintree River Ferry on the Daintree River

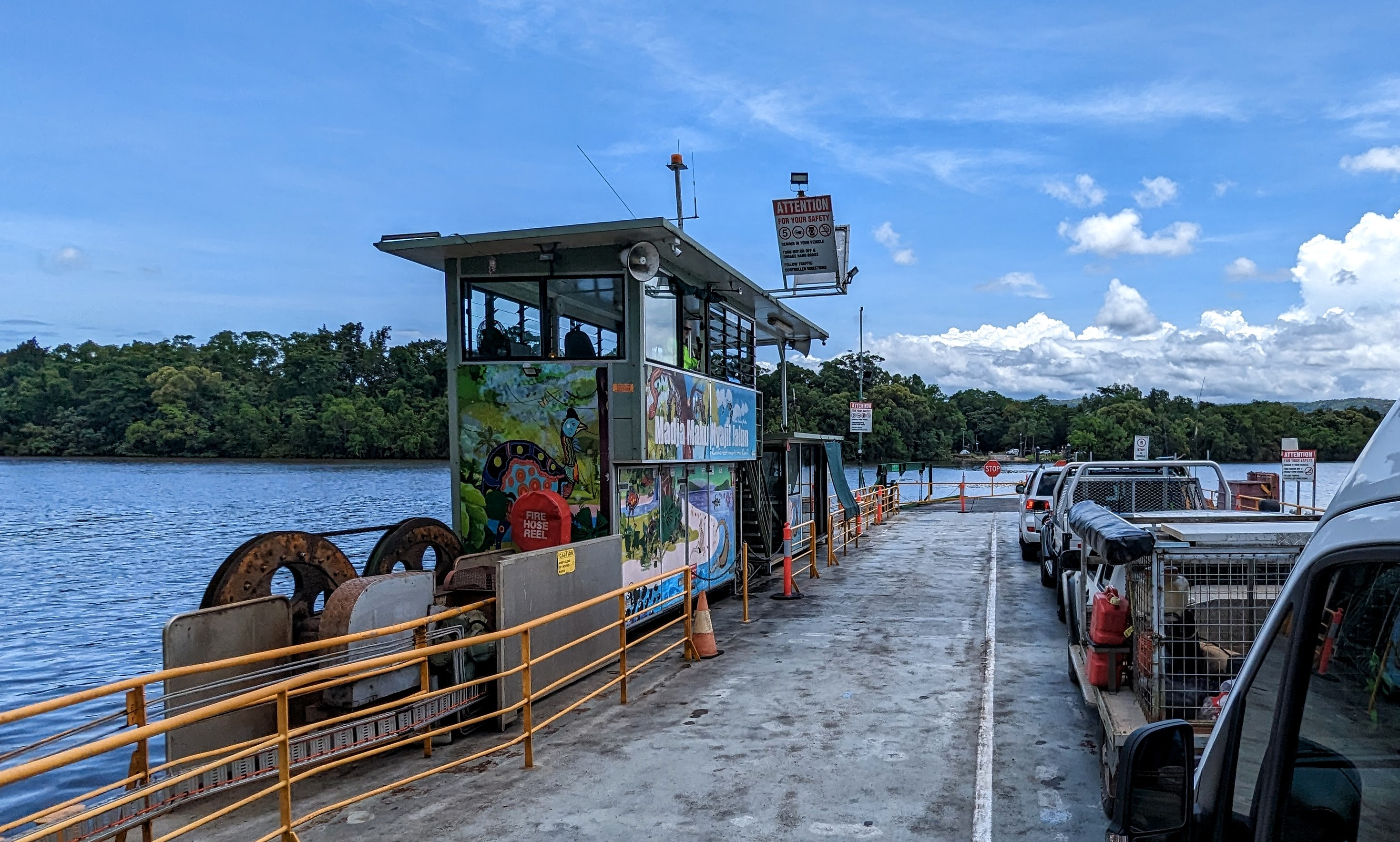
Daintree River Ferry from van on board

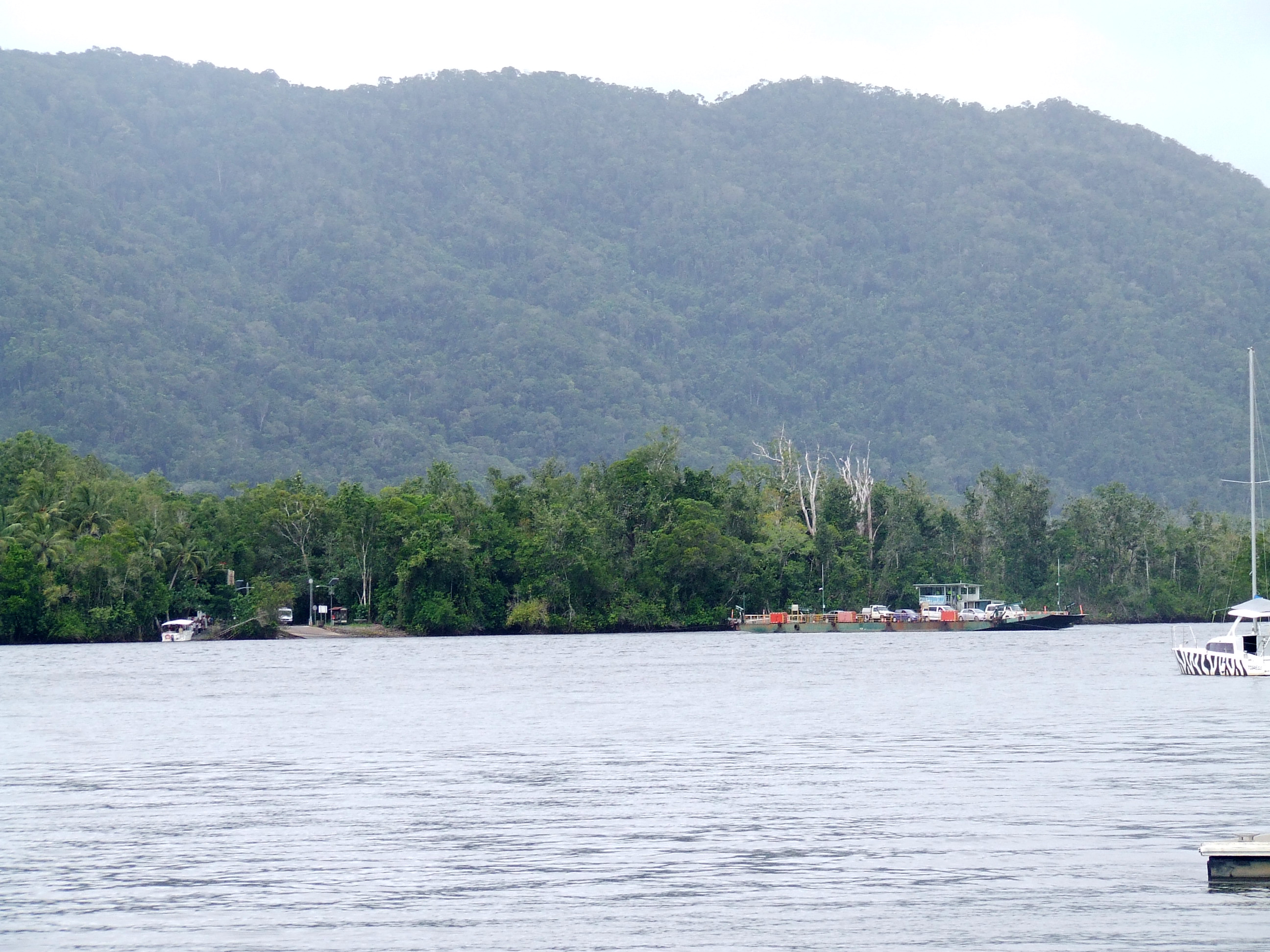
View of the ferry landing point on the northern bank of the Daintree River from the commercial pontoon pier where trips of the river depart.

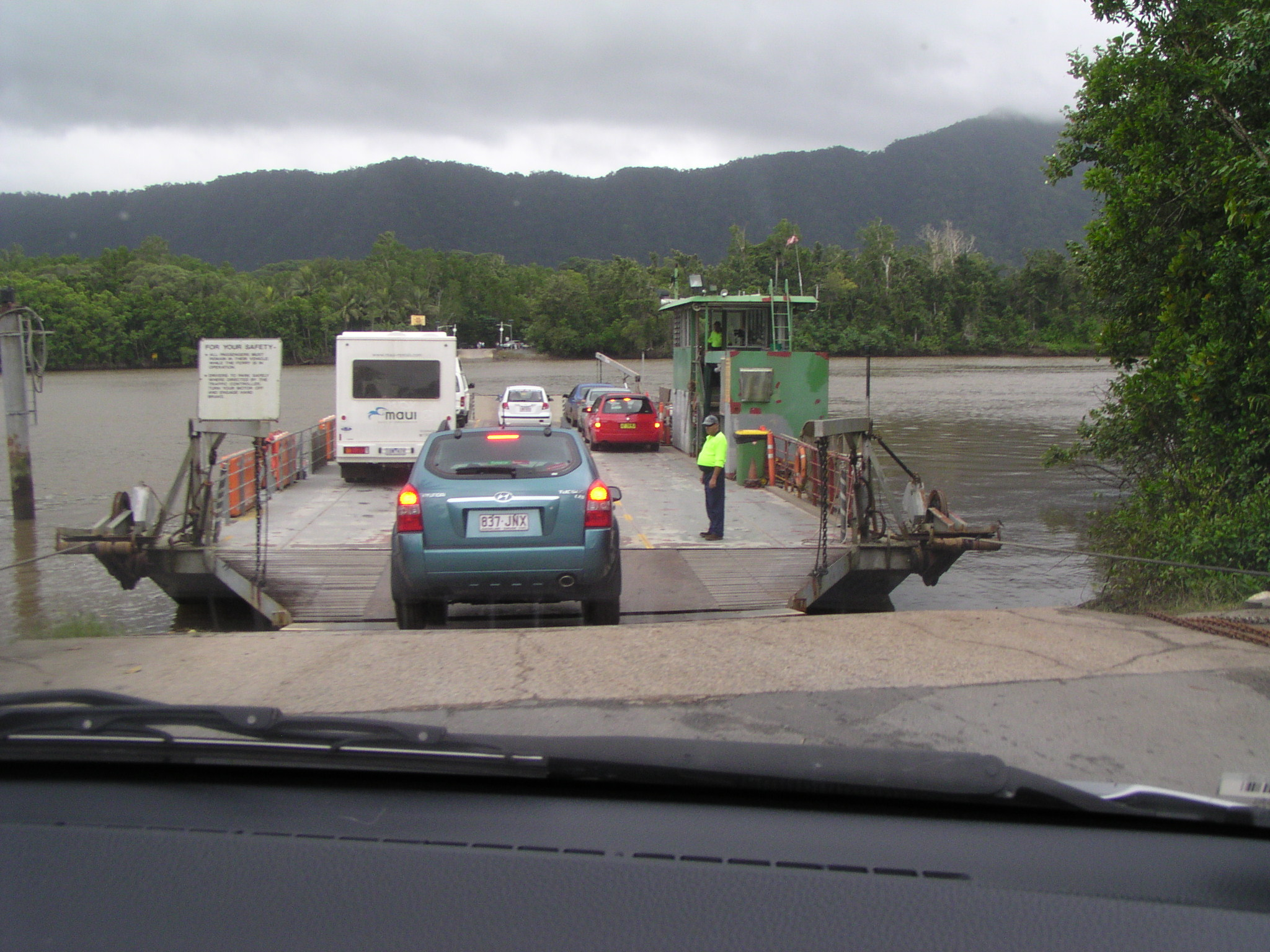
The Old Daintree Ferry

The Daintree River Ferry (or Daintree Ferry) is a cable ferry across the Daintree River between the localities of Forest Creek and Lower Daintree in the Shire of Douglas, Queensland, Australia. The ferry is situated some 50 kilometres (31 mi) north of Port Douglas, and gives access to the northern section of the Daintree National Park and to Cape Tribulation. The ferry provides the only sealed road access to this area.

The 43.2m ferry carries a maximum of 27 vehicles, and takes about 5 minutes to cross the river. It operates from early morning until midnight, seven days a week, with limited hours on Christmas Day. The ferry is operated by Birdon, on behalf of the Douglas Shire Council. A toll is charged for the crossing and is managed through the local council's Ferry Fund.

At busy times, for example during school holidays, some delays can occur when waiting to cross the ferry. The construction of a bridge has been discussed, but has been rejected by Queensland State Government. The ferry was replaced in 2006, replacing the previous ferry which carried a maximum of 16 vehicles. This has substantially reduced any delays in making the crossing.

== Design ==
The ferry travels along a steel cable 38 mm in diameter, which is connected to one point on each of the two sides of the river crossing point. The ferry is pulled along the cable by an onboard hydraulic winch. The cable is replaced annually.
