= Cow Bay, Queensland =

Cow Bay
- Suburb
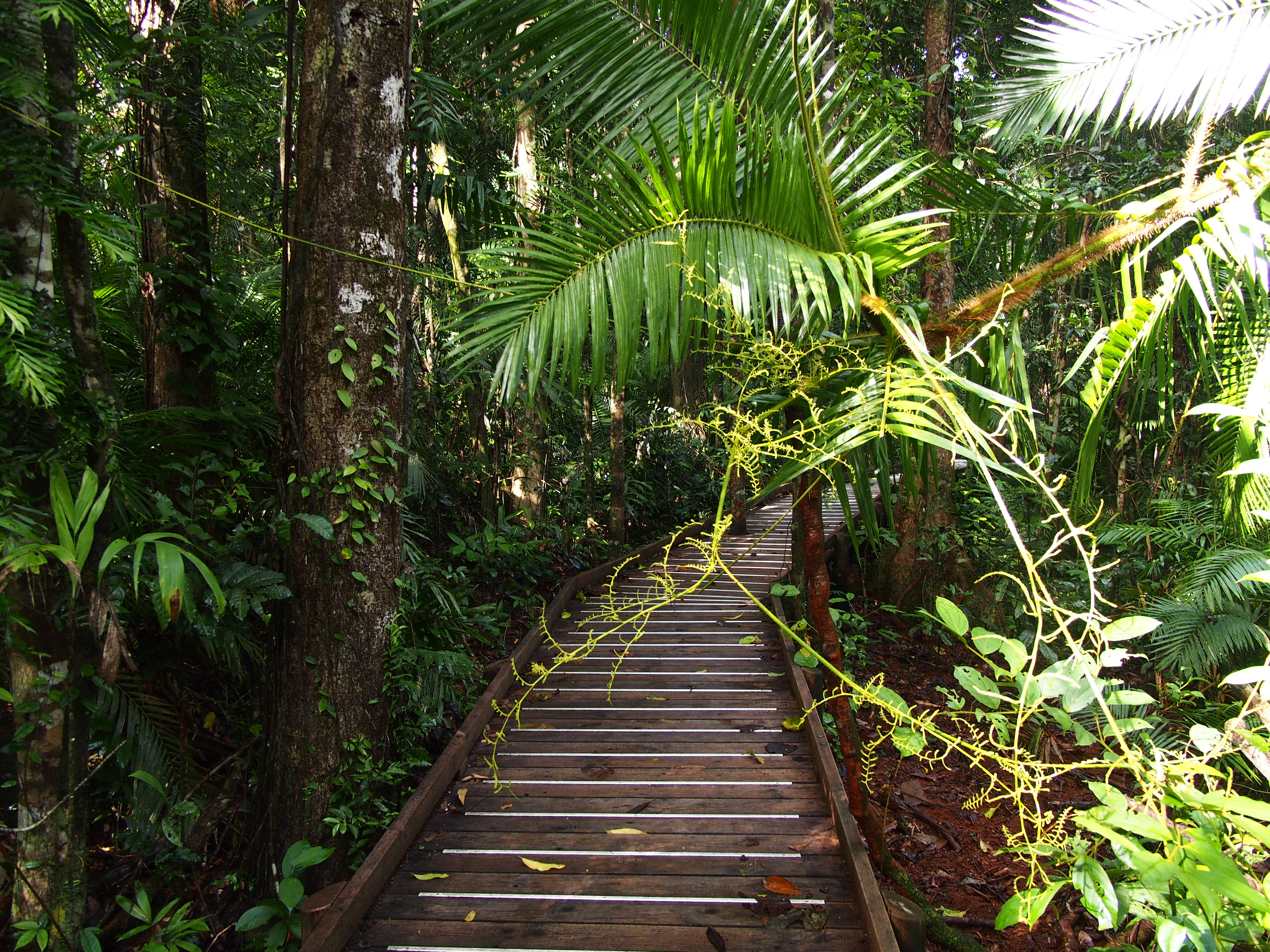
- Jindalba Boardwalk, 2013

- Interactive map of Cow Bay
- Coordinates: 16.2219°S 145.4327°E
- Country: Australia
- State: Queensland
- LGA: Shire of Douglas
- Location: 29.2 km (18.1 mi) ENE of Daintree; 44.8 km (27.8 mi) NNE of Mossman; 120 km (75 mi) NNW of Cairns; 1,818 km (1,130 mi) NNW of Brisbane

Government
  - State electorate: Cook
  - Federal division: Leichhardt

Area
  - Total: 29.3 km^{2} (11.3 sq mi)

Population
  - Total: 220 (2021 census)
  - Density: 7.51/km^{2} (19.4/sq mi)
- Time zone: UTC+10:00 (AEST)
- Postcode: 4873
Suburbs around Cow Bay
Noah	Diwan	Coral Sea
Noah	Cow Bay	Coral Sea
Forest Creek	Kimberley	Kimberley

Cow Bay is a coastal locality in the Shire of Douglas, Queensland, Australia. In the 2021 census, Cow Bay had a population of 220 people.

== Geography ==
Hutchinson Creek forms most of the northern boundary. The waters of the Coral Sea form the north-eastern boundary and most of the eastern.

Cape Tribulation Road enters the locality from the south (Kimberley) and exits to the north (Diwan).

There are many sections of the Daintree National Park within the locality, particularly in the north-east, south and west of the locality.

Bailey Point is a headline half-way along the Cow Bay coastline (16.2166°S 145.4666°E). It was named by Commander John Lort Stokes of HMS Beagle on 30 July 1841, but the origin of the name is unknown.

Offshore from the southern part of the locality's coastal is the waterbody Cow Bay, part of the Coral Sea (16.2333°S 145.4733°E) from which the locality presumably takes its name. Although the bay was not officially named until 1984, the name was in common use locally for many years, referring to the many dugongs (also known as sea cows) in the waters of the bay.

Alexandra Bay is offshore from the locality's northern coast (16.1896°S 145.4459°E).

Just inland from Bailey Point is Bailey Hill (16.2148°S 145.4623°E) at 277 metres (909 ft) above sea level, while Flat Peak is in the south of the locality (16.2438°S 145.4183°E) at 443 metres (1,453 ft).

Daintree Airstrip was at 1506 Cape Tribulation Road in the flatter northern part of the locality. It was repurposed for a plant nursery in 2022.

== History ==
The area was named Cow Bay on 17 March 1984, becoming an official locality on 8 September 2000.

== Demographics ==
In the 2016 census, Cow Bay had a population of 202 people.

In the 2021 census, Cow Bay had a population of 220 people.

== Education ==
There are no schools in Cow Bay. The nearest government primary school is Alexandra Bay State School in neighbouring Diwan to the north. The nearest government secondary school is Mossman State High School in Mossman to the south.

== Attractions ==
The Daintree Discovery Centre is on Cape Tribulation Road (16.23705°S 145.42537°E). Jindalba Boardwalk is nearby on Tulip Oak Road (16.2397°S 145.4344°E).

A number of walking tracks commence at the abandoned Daintree Airstrip.
