= Miallo, Queensland =

Miallo
- Suburb
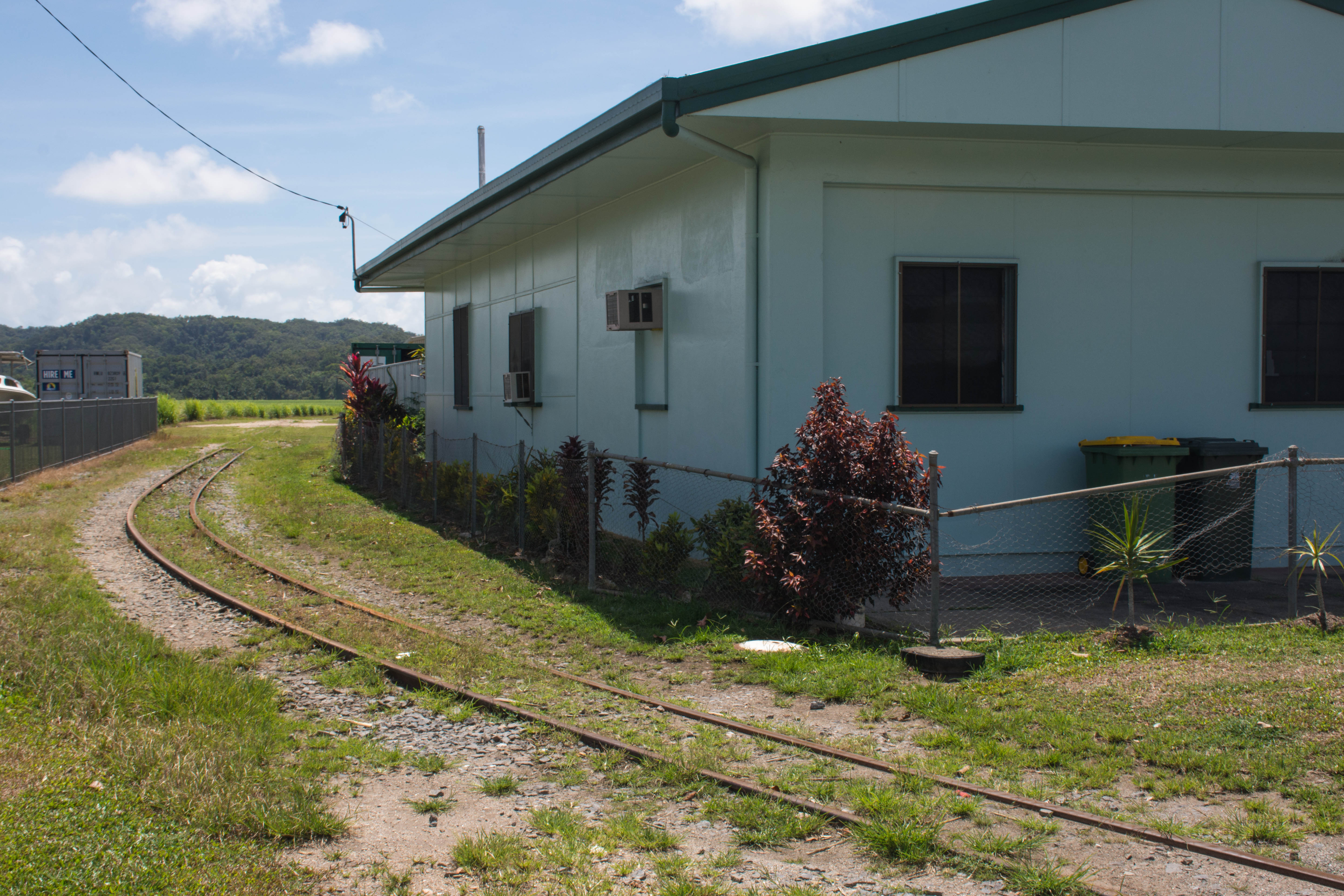
- A farm house in Miallo next to the cane railway

- Interactive map of Miallo
- Coordinates: 16.4055°S 145.3683°E
- Country: Australia
- State: Queensland
- LGA: Shire of Douglas
- Location: 5.9 km (3.7 mi) N of Mossman; 25.8 km (16.0 mi) NW of Port Douglas; 81.2 km (50.5 mi) NW of Cairns; 1,758 km (1,092 mi) NNW of Brisbane

Government
  - State electorate: Cook
  - Federal division: Leichhardt

Area
  - Total: 28.0 km^{2} (10.8 sq mi)

Population
  - Total: 406 (2021 census)
  - Density: 14.50/km^{2} (37.55/sq mi)
- Time zone: UTC+10:00 (AEST)
- Postcode: 4873
Suburbs around Miallo
| Whyanbeel | Whyanbeel | Bamboo |
| Syndicate | Miallo | Rocky Point |
| Syndicate | Mossman | Newell |

Miallo is a rural locality in the Shire of Douglas, Queensland, Australia. In the 2021 census, Miallo had a population of 406 people.

== Geography ==
Miallo consists of flat land (about 10 metres above sea level) which is used for farming surrounding a mountainous area rising to Mount Somerset (16.4217°S 145.3668°E), a peak 221 metres (725 ft) above sea level. The crops grown are sugarcane and tropical fruit.

There is a cane tramway system through Miallo to deliver sugarcane to the sugar mill at Mossman.

Thooleer is a neighbourhood in the locality (16.4166°S 145.3833°E).

== History ==
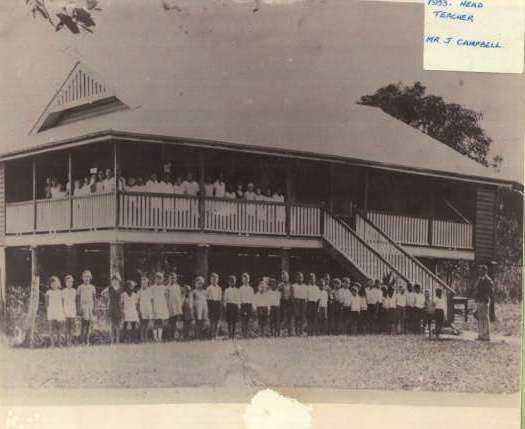
Old school building, Miallo State School

The name Miallo is an Aboriginal word, meaning wild country.

Mialloa Provisional School opened on 2 October 1911. It became Miallo State School on 30 July 1923.

On Sunday 20 December, St Anthony's Catholic Church was officially opened and dedicated by Bishop Thomas Cahill. It was a reconstruction of a building bought from Lawrence Butler Rutherford. Prior to the construction of the church, Mass had been held in private homes.

== Demographics ==
In the 2016 census, Miallo had a population of 376 people.

In the 2021 census, Miallo had a population of 406 people.

== Education ==
Miallo State School is a government primary (Prep-6) school for boys and girls on Miallo Bamboo Creek Road (16.3888°S 145.3761°E). In 2017, the school had an enrolment of 179 students with 16 teachers (11 full-time equivalent) and 13 non-teaching staff (6 full-time equivalent). In 2018, the school had an enrolment of 190 students with 16 teachers (11 full-time equivalent) and 12 non-teaching staff (6 full-time equivalent).

There is no secondary school in Miallo. The nearest government secondary school is Mossman State High School in neighbouring Mossman to the south.
