= Degarra, Queensland =

Degarra
- Suburb
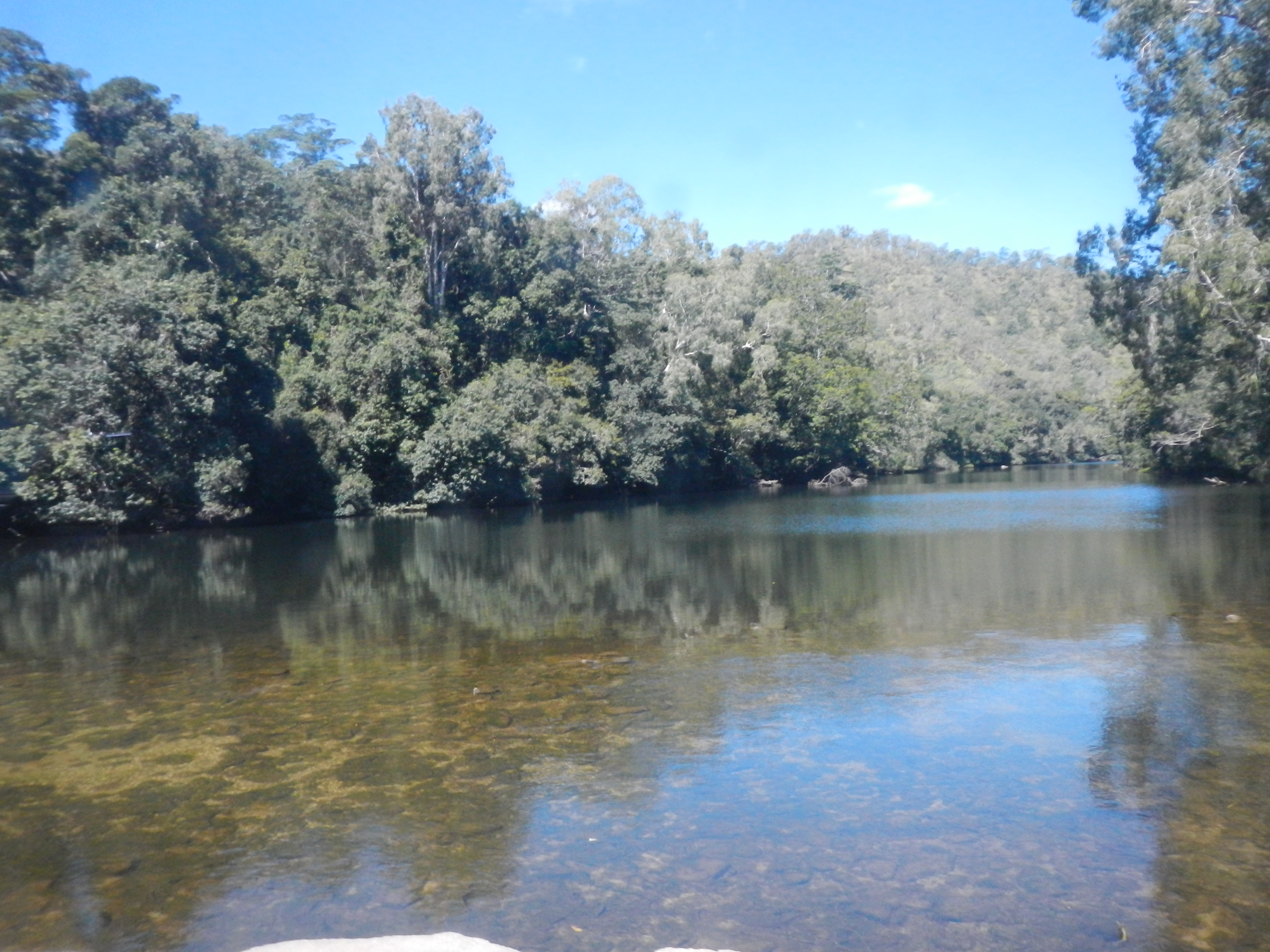
- Crossing the Bloomfield River at Degarra

- Interactive map of Degarra
- Coordinates: 16.0277°S 145.2469°E
- Country: Australia
- State: Queensland
- LGA: Shire of Douglas
- Location: 12.4 km (7.7 mi) S of Bloomfield; 92.3 km (57.4 mi) N of Mossman; 168 km (104 mi) N of Cairns; 2,022 km (1,256 mi) NNW of Brisbane

Government
  - State electorate: Cook
  - Federal division: Leichhardt

Area
  - Total: 6.8 km^{2} (2.6 sq mi)

Population
  - Total: 80 (2021 census)
  - Density: 11.8/km^{2} (30.5/sq mi)
- Time zone: UTC+10:00 (AEST)
- Postcode: 4895
Suburbs around Degarra
Bloomfield	Bloomfield	Cape Tribulation
Wujal Wujal	Degarra	Bloomfield
Wujal Wujal	Bloomfield	Bloomfield

Degarra is a rural coastal locality in the Shire of Douglas, Queensland, Australia. In the 2021 census, Degarra had a population of 80 people.

== Geography ==
The locality is bounded to the north by the Bloomfield River.

There are a number of islands in the Bloomfield River. One of the named islands is Spit Island (15.9456°S 145.3369°E). It is 6.4928 hectares (16.044 acres). Scrub Island is an island in the Woobadda River, a tributary of the Bloomfield River. The island is just prior to their confluence (15.9498°S 145.3405°E). It is 3.0387-hectare (7.509-acre) island. There are a number of other unnamed islands in the Bloomfield River.

The locality is shaped like a dumbbell with two discontiguous areas of land connected by a short section of the Bloomfield River, creating a distinct east and west separation within the locality.

The land use in the west of the locality is predominantly grazing on native vegetation with some residential housing near the river. The land use in the east of the locality is relatively undeveloped with some pockets of housing along the rivers. The easternmost point of the locality is at the mouth of Bloomfield River where it flows into the Coral Sea, giving the locality a small coastal boundary.

== Demographics ==
In the 2016 census, Degarra had a population of 110 people.

In the 2021 census, Degarra had a population of 80 people.

== Education ==
There are no schools in Degarra. The nearest government primary school is Bloomfield River State School in neighbouring Bloomfield to the north. There are no secondary schools nearby; the alternatives are distance education and boarding school.
