= Newell, Queensland =

Newell
- Town
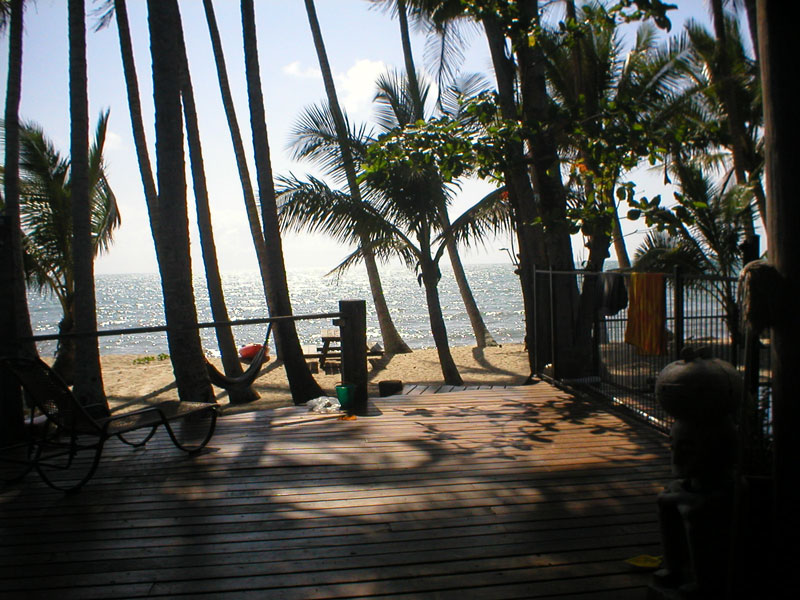
- View from beach house, Newell, 2004

- Interactive map of Newell
- Coordinates: 16.4273°S 145.4058°E
- Country: Australia
- State: Queensland
- LGA: Shire of Douglas
- Location: 7.1 km (4.4 mi) NE of Mossman; 26.7 km (16.6 mi) NW of Port Douglas; 82.3 km (51.1 mi) NNW of Cairns; 1,776 km (1,104 mi) NNW of Brisbane

Government
  - State electorate: Cook
  - Federal division: Leichhardt

Area
  - Total: 15.0 km^{2} (5.8 sq mi)

Population
  - Total: 327 (2021 census)
  - Density: 21.80/km^{2} (56.46/sq mi)
- Time zone: UTC+10:00 (AEST)
- Postcode: 4873
Localities around Newell
Miallo	Rocky Point	Coral Sea
Miallo	Newell	Coral Sea
Mossman	Bonnie Doon	Cooya Beach

Newell is a coastal town and rural locality in the Shire of Douglas, Queensland, Australia. It is a sugarcane growing district.

In the 2021 census, the locality of Newell had a population of 327 people.

== Geography ==
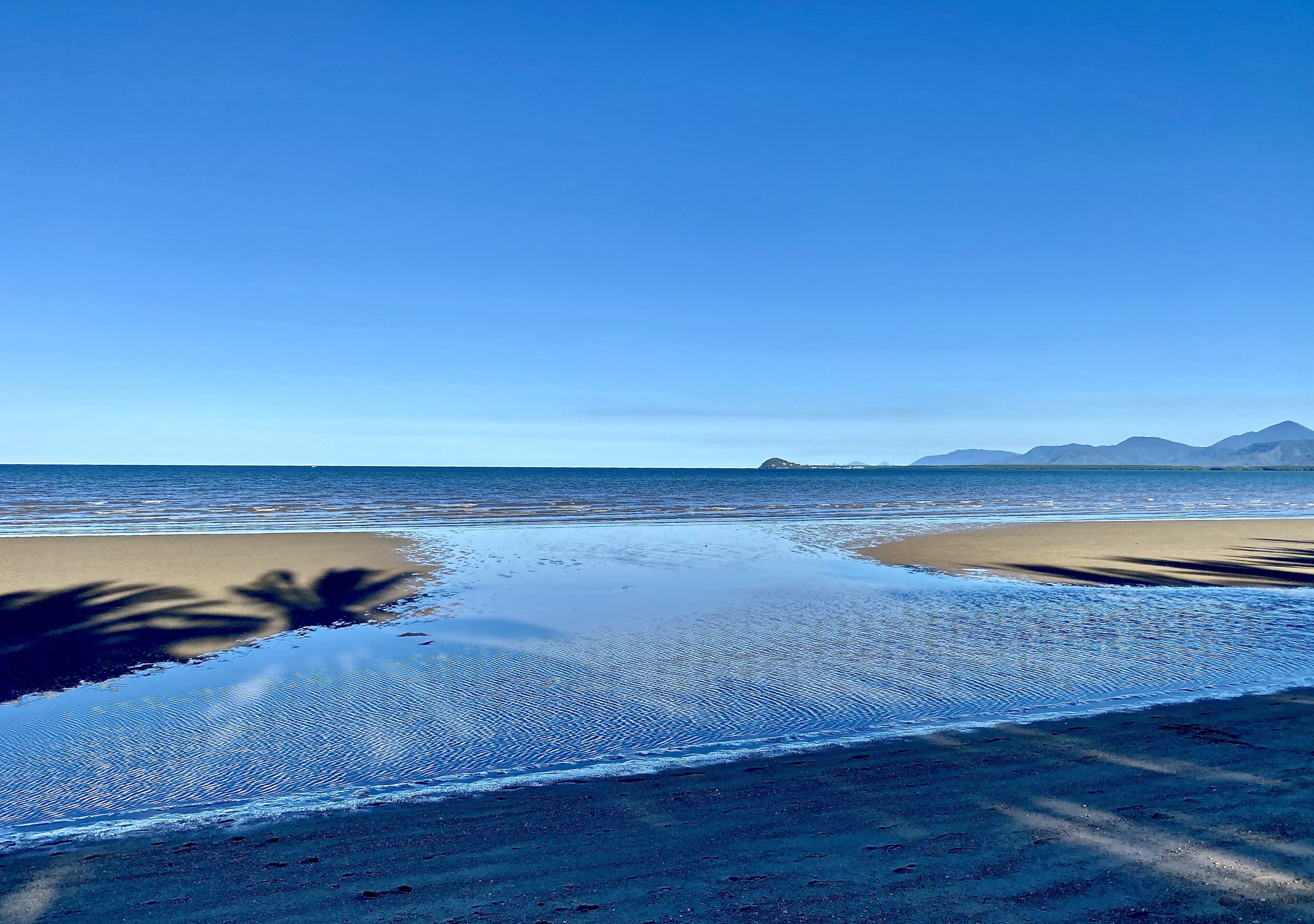
Saltwater Creek, Newell, looking towards Port Douglas, 2020

The locality is bounded to the west by the Mossman Daintree Road and a cane tramway line to the Mossman Sugar Mill and to the east by the Coral Sea. It is partly bounded to the north by Coop Creek and Saltwater Creek and to the south by the Mossman River, which enters the Coral Sea at the south-eastern point of the locality. The town is spread along on the coastline with most houses only two streets from the beach. The remainder of the land, all of which is low-lying, is predominantly used for agriculture, mostly sugarcane.

== History ==
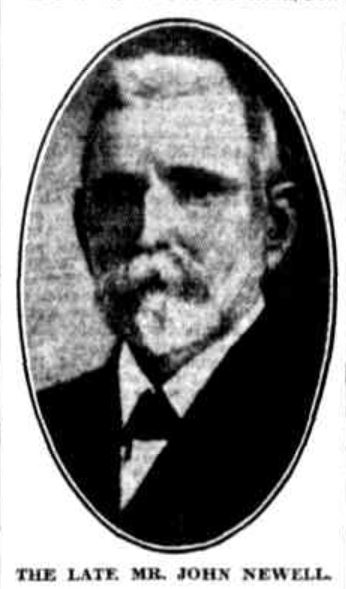
John Newell, circa 1932

The town is named after prominent local business man and politician John Newell.

== Demographics ==
In the 2016 census, the locality of Newell had a population of 336 people.

In the 2021 census, the locality of Newell had a population of 327 people.

== Education ==
There are no schools in Newell. The nearest government primary and secondary schools are Mossman State School and Mossman State High School, both in neighbouring Mossman to the south-west.

== Amenities ==
Despite its name, the Mossman Golf Course is located in Newell on the north-east corner of the Mossman Daintree Road and Newell Road (16.4317°S 145.3927°E).

There is a boat ramp and jetty at the southern end of Rankin Street on the north bank of Mossman River Heads (16.4338°S 145.4042°E). It is managed by the Douglas Shire Council.
