= Diwan, Queensland =

Diwan
- Suburb
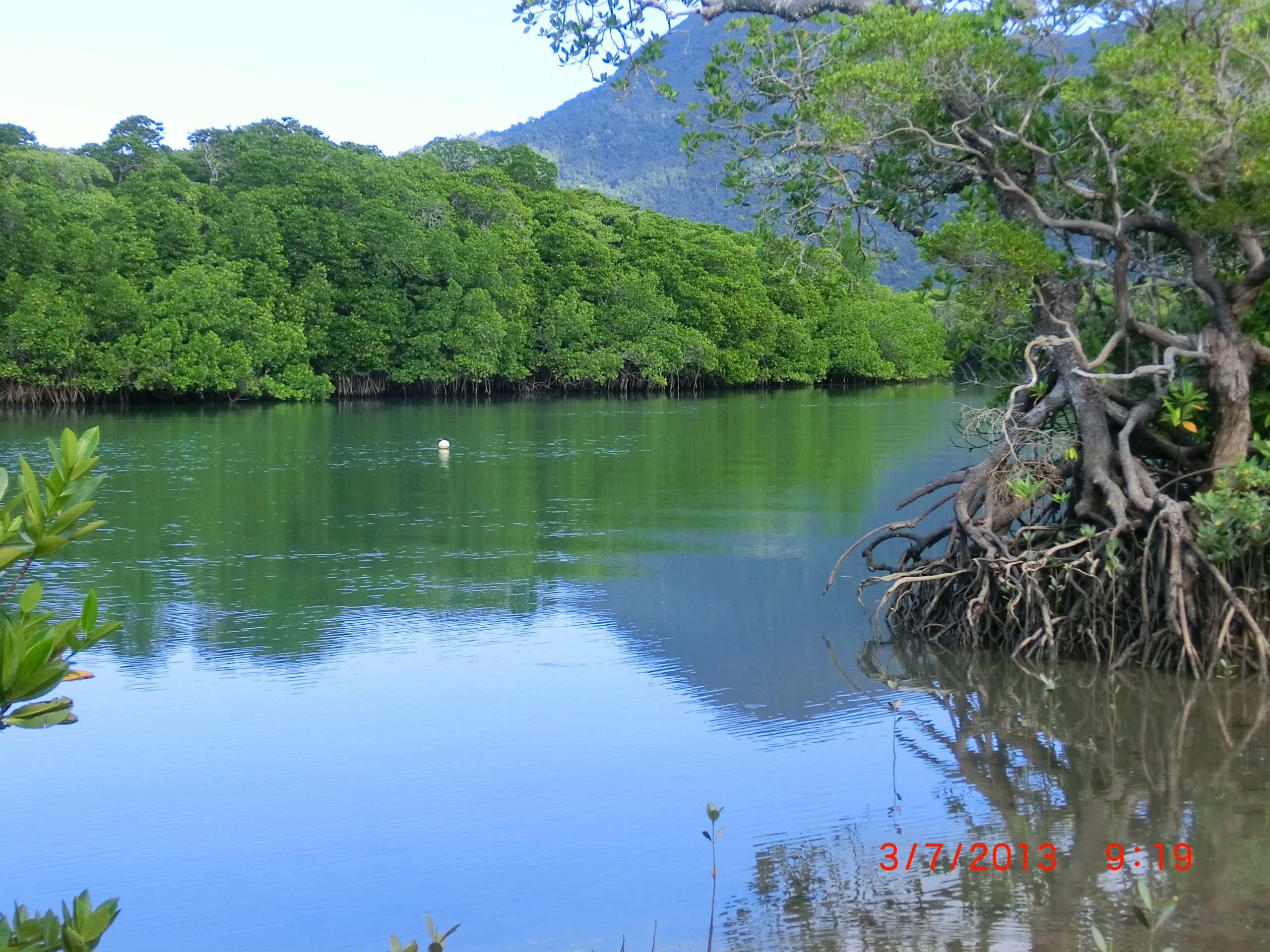
- Diwan landscape, 2013

- Interactive map of Diwan
- Coordinates: 16.1861°S 145.4233°E
- Country: Australia
- State: Queensland
- LGA: Shire of Douglas
- Location: 28.9 km (18.0 mi) NE of Daintree; 44.5 km (27.7 mi) N of Mossman; 120 km (75 mi) NNW of Cairns; 1,817 km (1,129 mi) NNW of Brisbane

Government
  - State electorate: Cook
  - Federal division: Leichhardt

Area
  - Total: 23.4 km^{2} (9.0 sq mi)

Population
  - Total: 169 (2021 census)
  - Density: 7.22/km^{2} (18.71/sq mi)
- Time zone: UTC+10:00 (AEST)
- Postcode: 4873
Suburbs around Diwan
Noah	Thornton Beach	Coral Sea
Noah	Diwan	Coral Sea
Cow Bay	Cow Bay	Cow Bay

Diwan is a coastal locality in the Shire of Douglas, Queensland, Australia. In the 2021 census, Diwan had a population of 169 people.

== Geography ==
The locality is partly bounded by Cape Tribulation Road to the north, by Alexandra Bay (within the Coral Sea, 16.1863°S 145.4472°E) to the east, and by Hutchinson Creek to the south.

Most of Diwan is within the Daintree National Park.

== History ==
Alexandra Bay State School opened on 1 June 1986.

The locality was named and bounded on 8 September 2000.

== Demographics ==
In the 2016 census, Diwan had a population of 153 people.

In the 2021 census, Diwan had a population of 169 people.

== Education ==
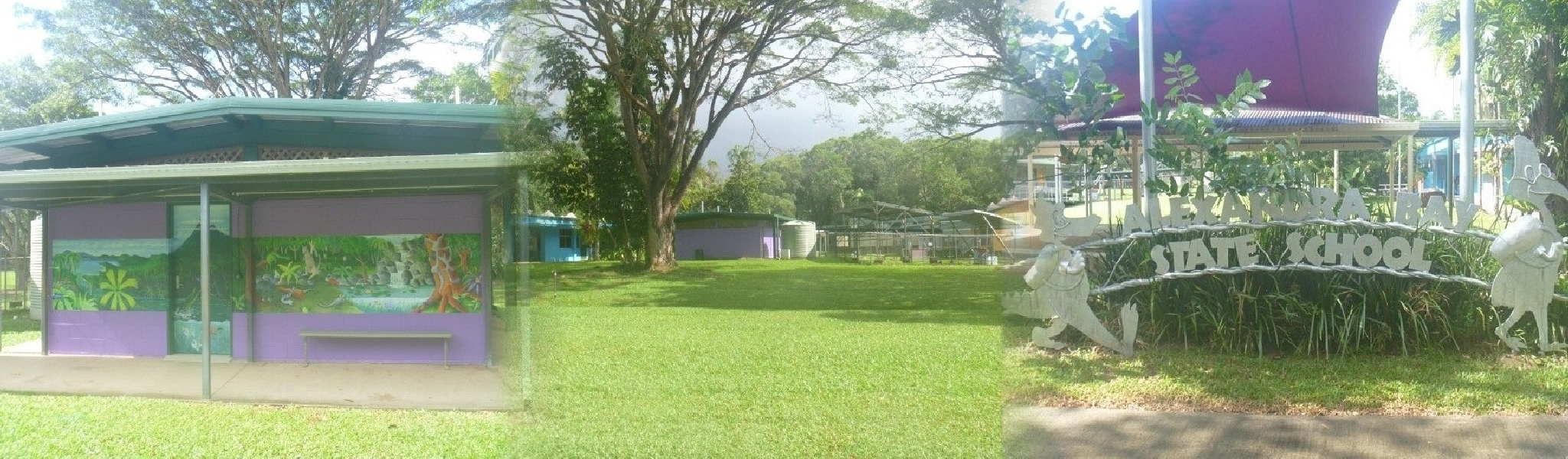
Alexandra Bay State School

Alexandra Bay State School is a government primary (Early Childhood-6) school for boys and girls at Lot 1 Cape Tribulation Road (16.2138°S 145.4222°E). In 2017, the school had an enrolment of 31 students with 3 teachers and 6 non-teaching staff (3 full-time equivalent). In 2018, the school had an enrolment of 27 students with 3 teachers and 6 non-teaching staff (3 full-time equivalent).

There is no secondary school in Diwan. The nearest government secondary school is Mossman State High School in Mossman to the south.
