= Rocky Point, Queensland (Douglas Shire) =

Rocky Point
- Suburb
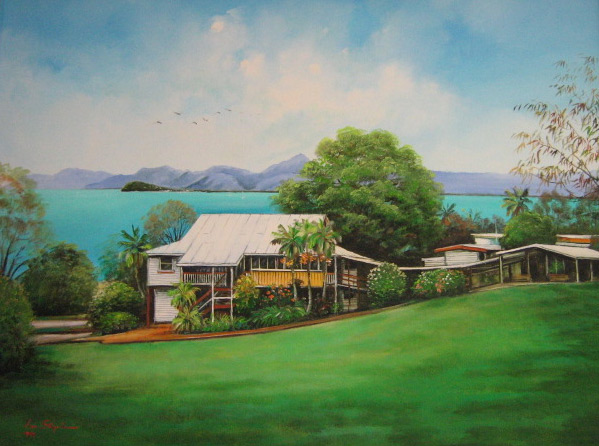
- Rocky Point State School (at original site)

- Interactive map of Rocky Point
- Coordinates: 16.39°S 145.4122°E
- Country: Australia
- State: Queensland
- LGA: Shire of Douglas
- Location: 10.8 km (6.7 mi) NE of Mossman; 30.6 km (19.0 mi) NNW of Port Douglas; 86.0 km (53.4 mi) NNW of Cairns; 1,762 km (1,095 mi) NNW of Brisbane

Government
  - State electorate: Cook
  - Federal division: Leichhardt

Area
  - Total: 20.2 km^{2} (7.8 sq mi)

Population
  - Total: 145 (2021 census)
  - Density: 7.18/km^{2} (18.59/sq mi)
- Time zone: UTC+10:00 (AEST)
Suburbs around Rocky Point
Bamboo	Wonga Beach	Coral Sea
Bamboo	Rocky Point	Coral Sea
Miallo	Newell	Coral Sea

Rocky Point is a coastal rural locality in the Shire of Douglas, Queensland, Australia. In the 2021 census, Rocky Point had a population of 145 people.

== Geography ==
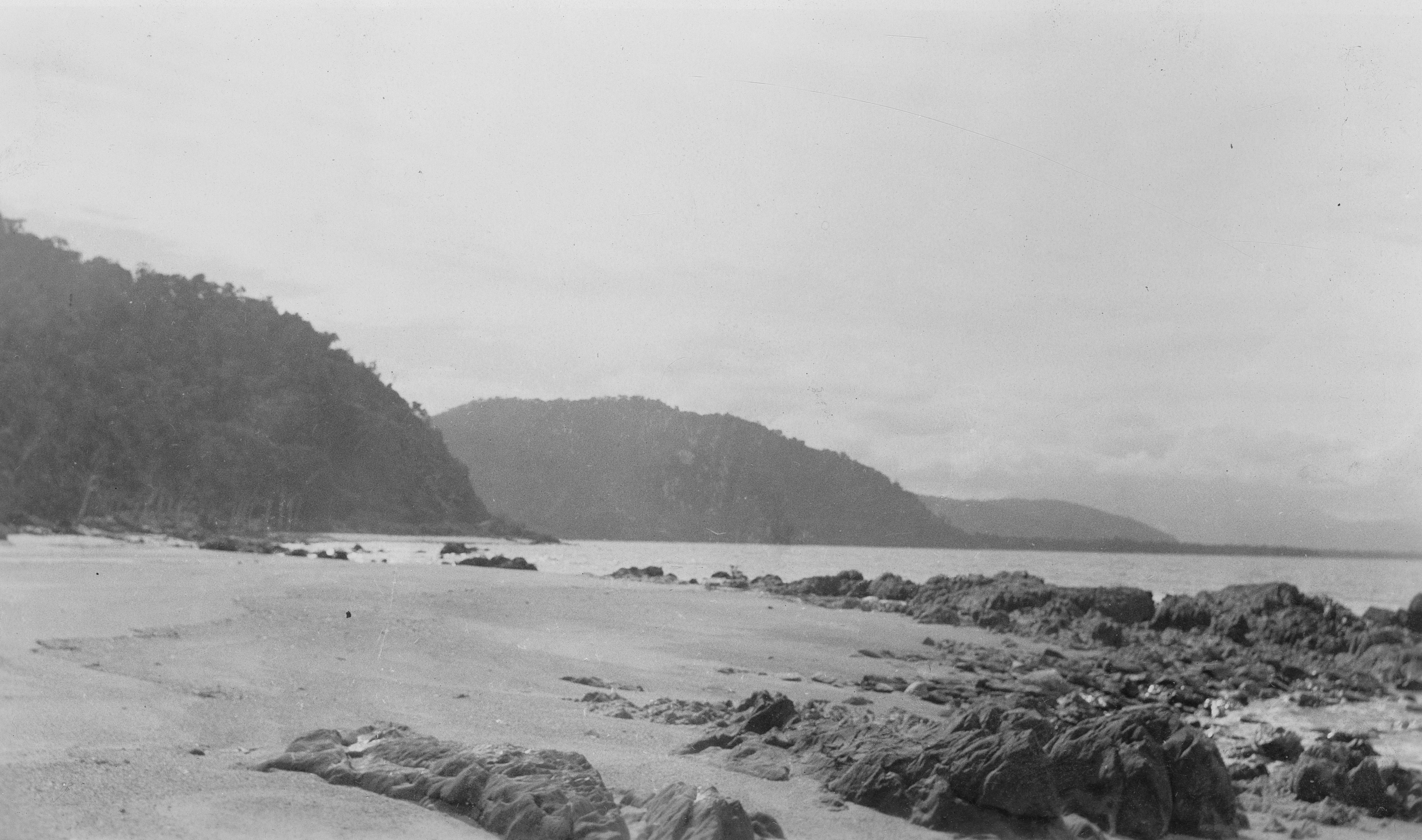
Beach at Rocky Point, circa 1938

The Coral Sea forms the eastern boundary, and Saltwater Creek the southern.

Dayman Point (also known as Rocky Point) is a coastal headland and the easternmost part of the locality (16.3872°S 145.4190°E). It is named after Lieutenant Joseph Dayman of the Royal Navy who served on the survey ship HMS Rattlesnake from 1847 to 1848 during its exploration of northern Australia.

== History ==
Rocky Point State School opened on 23 February 1939. The school was at 14 Rocky Point School Road (16.3874°S 145.4176°E). In 1999, the school was relocated to Wonga Beach, about 4 kilometres (2.5 mi) north of the original school, and renamed Wonga Beach State School. Most of the Rocky Point school buildings were sold for housing, but one was relocated to Wonga Beach.

== Demographics ==
In the 2016 census, Rocky Point had a population of 129 people.

In the 2021 census, Rocky Point had a population of 145 people.

== Education ==
There are no schools in Rocky Point. The nearest government primary schools are Miallo State School in neighbouring Miallo to the west and Wonga Beach State School in neighbouring Wonga Beach to the north. The nearest government secondary school is Mossman State High School in Mossman to the south-west.

== Amenities ==
There is a breakwater and boat ramp on Mossman Daintree Road (16.3869°S 145.4191°E). They are managed by the Douglas Shire Council.
