= Daintree National Park =

National park in Australia

- IUCN category II (national park)
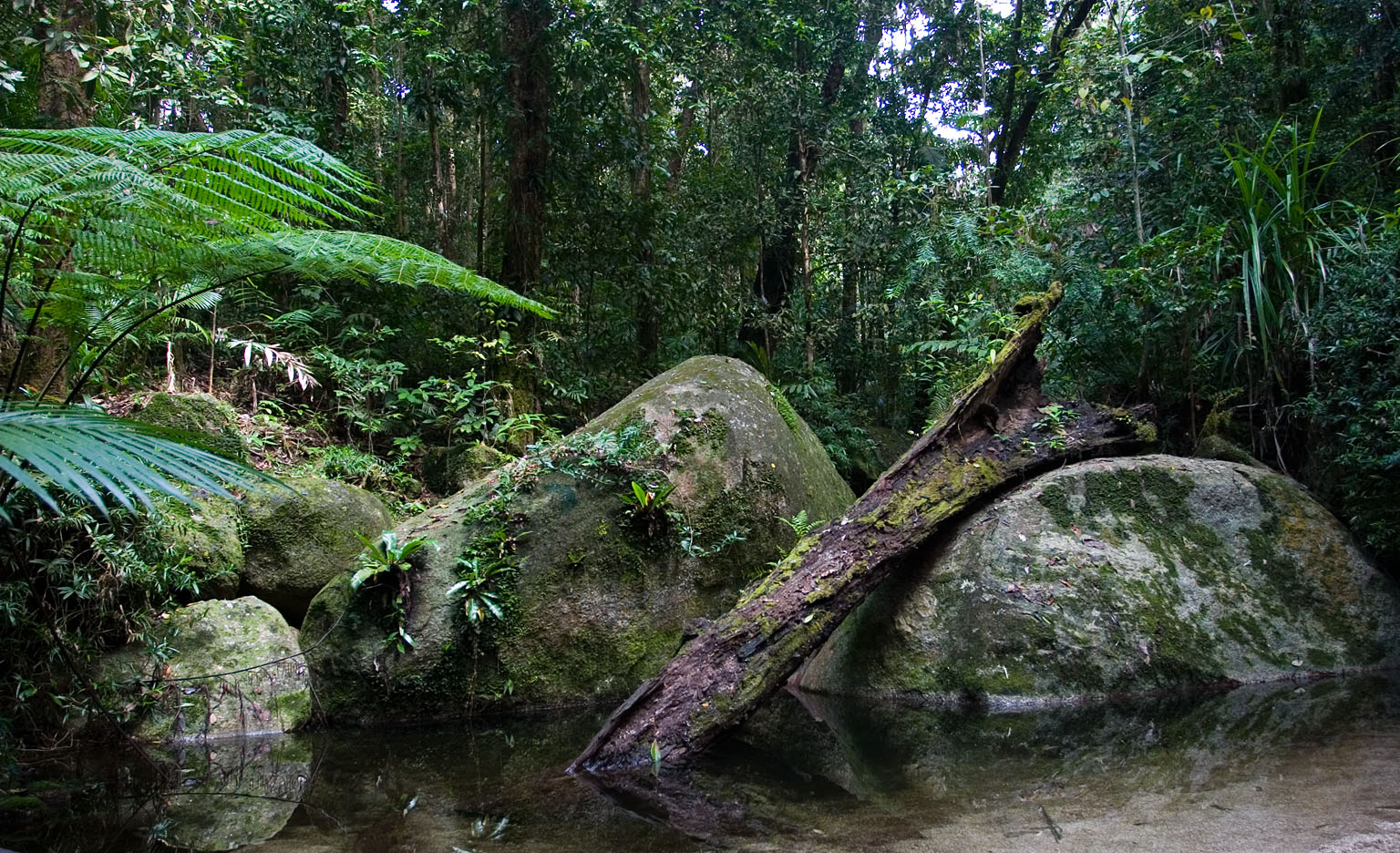
- A typical rainforest scene in Daintree National Park

- Location within Queensland
- Location: Queensland
- Nearest city: Daintree
- Coordinates: 16°18′S 145°12′E
- Area: 1,200 km^{2} (460 sq mi)
- Established: 1988
- Visitors: 753,000 (domestic visitors only) (in 2012)
- Governing body: Queensland Parks and Wildlife Service
- Website: https://parks.des.qld.gov.au/parks/daintree

Daintree National Park is located in Far North Queensland, Australia, about 100 km (62 mi) northwest of Cairns. It was founded in 1981 and is part of the Wet Tropics of Queensland. In 1988, it became a World Heritage Site. The park consists of two sections—Mossman Gorge and Cape Tribulation, with a settled agricultural area between them which includes the towns of Mossman and Daintree Village.

One entrance to Daintree National Park is located south of the Daintree River at Mossman Gorge where a visitor centre has been built from where tourists take a shuttle bus to the gorge, where they can take a walk or a refreshing swim.

Daintree National Park is valued because of its exceptional biodiversity. It contains significant habitat for rare species and prolific birdlife. The name is derived from the Daintree River, which was named by George Elphinstone Dalrymple, an early explorer of the area, after his friend Richard Daintree.

In 2021, a historic deal made with the Queensland government has led to the eastern Kuku Yalanji people taking formal ownership of Daintree National Park.

== Mossman Gorge section ==
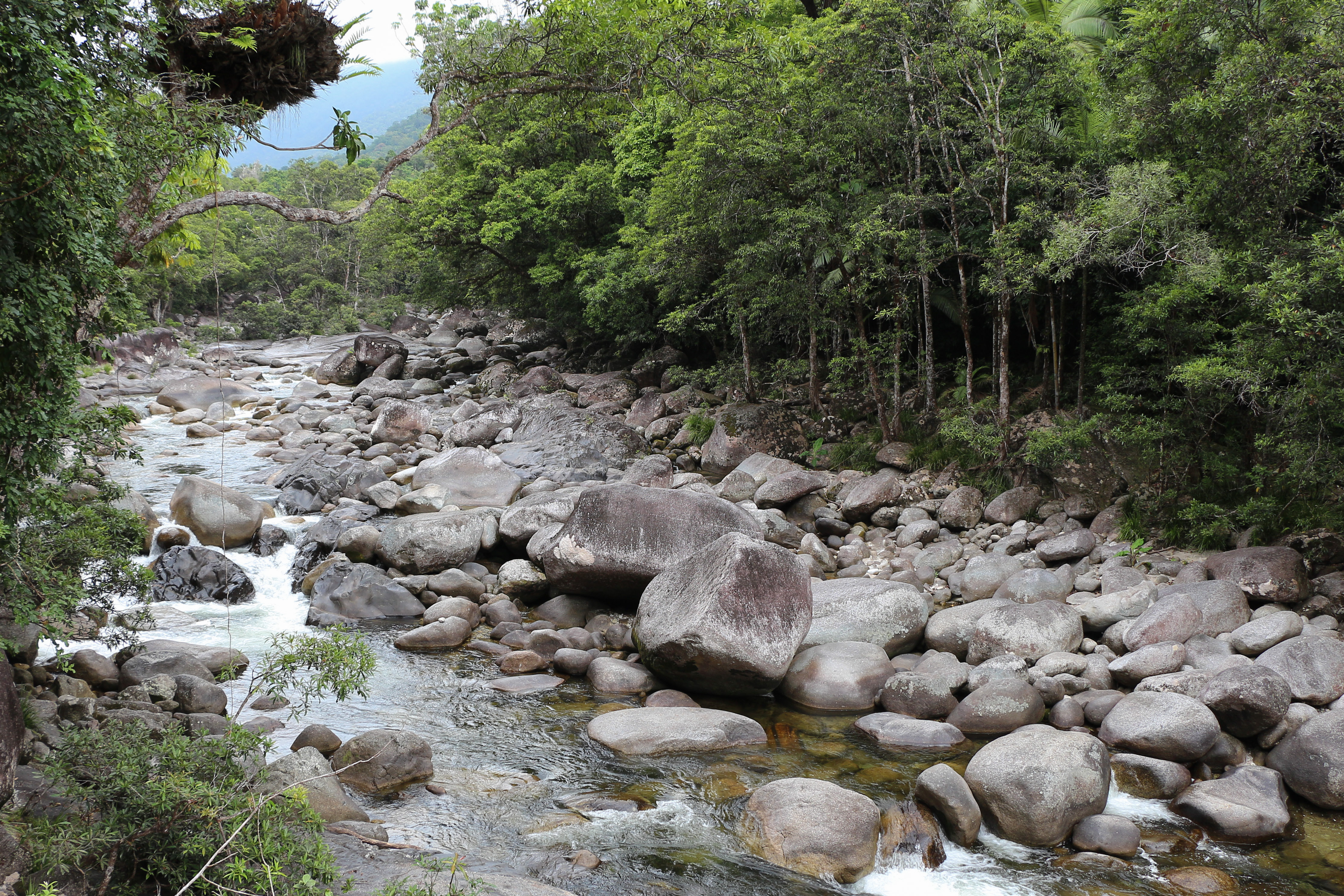
Mossman Gorge

The Great Dividing Range is close to the coast in this region. This section covers 56,500 ha (140,000 acres) of mostly inaccessible rainforests and mountain woodlands. The popular Mossman Gorge is located in the southern part of the park. Located 75 km (47 mi) north of Cairns via the Captain Cook Highway and Mossman, the gorge offers many scenic exploration walks including Baral Marrjanga, Lower river track, Rex Creek bridge, and the Rainforest circuit track. It is inhabited by noteworthy flora and fauna including Boyd's forest dragon and Victoria's riflebird.

== Cape Tribulation section ==
Cape Tribulation also lies in the park. Originally the cape belonged to Cape Tribulation National Park from 1981 but was amalgamated into Daintree National Park in 1983. This section covers 17,000 ha (42,000 acres) including the coastal range (Thornton Peak, Mt Hemmant, and Mt Sorrow, going north from the Daintree river) and contains Australia's last extensive stands of lowland rainforest. It has extensive (and relatively) unspoiled beaches from Thornton Beach to Cape Tribulation beach – fringed with the increasingly rare littoral (beachside) rainforest. The Daintree river is the southern boundary for the region - reinforced by the need to take a cable ferry across the Daintree river. Much of the coastal flatlands, especially to the south of the Alexandra range, and in Cow Bay, were cleared for agriculture in the late 1800s with a major clearing push in the 1970s. A lot of this has since recovered or has been settled.

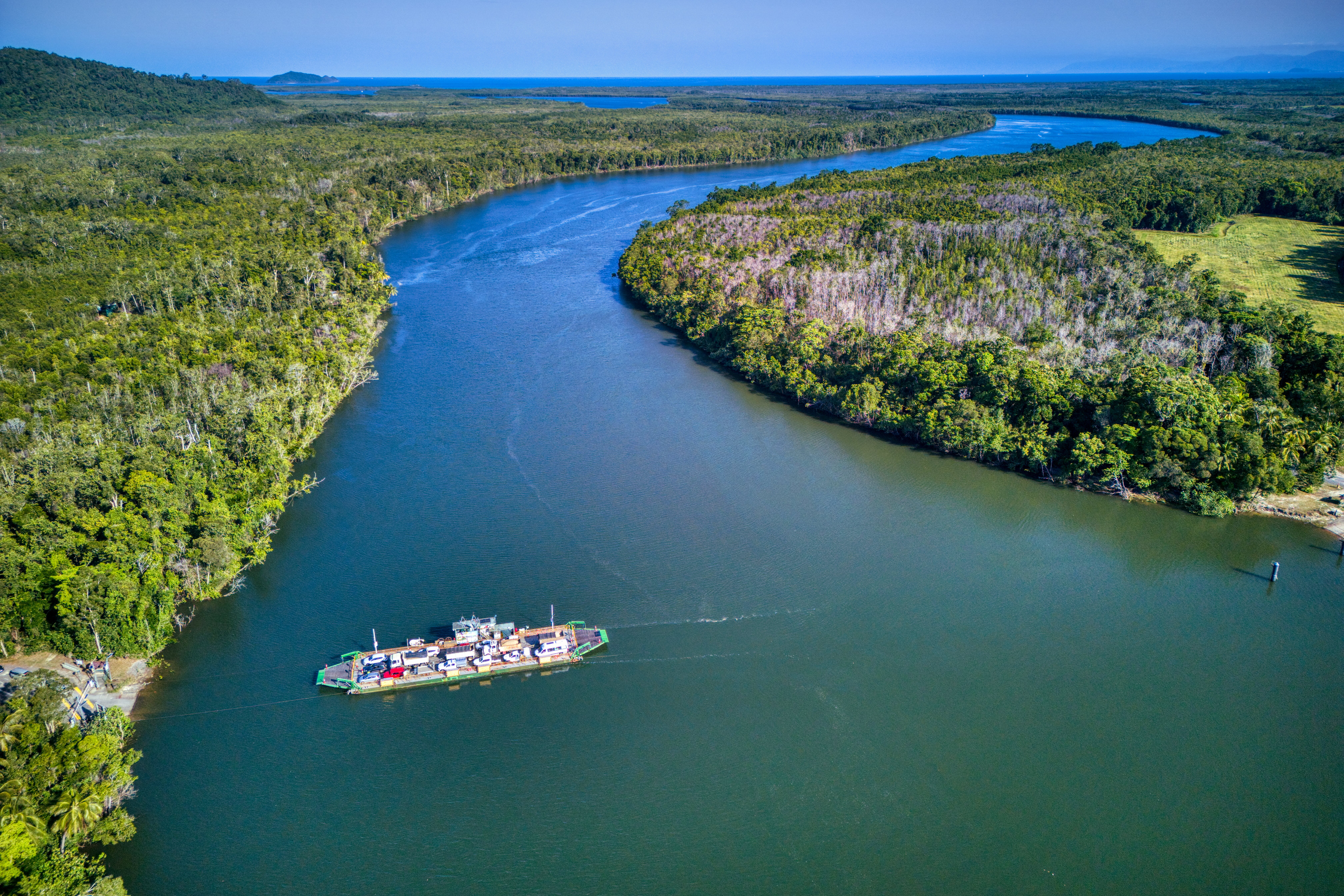
Daintree River Ferry and Daintree River

The Daintree National Park's traditional owners are the Eastern Kuku Yalanji Aboriginal people. Many of the natural features of the landscape hold spiritual significance for the traditional owners. One of these features is the location of the bouncing stones at Thornton Beach. The rocks here are hornfels, metamorphic rocks resulting from the effects of a major intrusion of granite that produced the coastal mountains. They are very elastic, when bounced on the local rock pavement; The park contains the Mossman River to the south, the Daintree River and the Bloomfield River to the north.

=== Geography ===
This section of the park includes the entirety of the Dagmar locality, in the Shire of Douglas, Queensland. The section also includes the northern and eastern parts of the adjacent Noah locality.

==== Dagmar ====
Dagmar
- Location within Queensland
- Location: Queensland
- Coordinates: 16.1747°S 145.2213°E
- Area: 199.7 km^{2} (77.1 sq mi)

The Daintree River forms the locality of Dagmar's north-eastern, northern, and north-western boundaries, while the Daintree Range loosely forms its southern boundary.

The locality takes its name from the Heights of Dagmar (now the Dagmar Range), which was named by explorer George Elphinstone Dalrymple in his 1873 exploration of the North East Coast of Queensland. In his report to the Queensland Parliament, Dalrymyple described the range as "jungle-clad hills" but he provided no explanation as to the choice of name. Others have claimed he so named it because of a resemblance to the Dagmar Cross. Dalyrmple described the land from the range down to the Daintree River as "luxuriant jungles, filling all the broad valley, and giving evidence of many thousands of acres of the same rich agricultural lands ... soon to be the gem of Australia", prophesying that agriculture rather than mining would be the longterm feature of the Queensland economy.

Another of the expedition members, Robert Johnstone (a sub-inspector in the Queensland Police Force) climbed to the top of the Heights of Dagmar, describing the range as "fine open grassy hills of good soil; the extent of rich jungle land is very extensive". Another expedition member Walter Hill (a botanist) described the soil "first class" and identified a new species of coconut palm. Hill also expressed the view that the land around the upper Daintree River would be able to support a large population, noting it would be suitable for the cultivation of sugarcane and other tropical crops as well as for grazing land. He also believed the Daintree River would be an effective transport route to the Palmer goldfields to the west.

In April 1886 Queensland Government offered land for sale in Dagmar, 4 parcels of 160 acres (65 ha) each, followed by further land sales and pastoral leases. By 1894, a number of blocks of land had been sold along the Daintree River in the south-east of the present boundaries of the locality.

In 1942 the Queensland Government set aside land in Dagmar to create a reserve as a source of timber (later known as the Dagmar State Forest). The timber reserve appears on a 1950 map.

=== Noah ===
Noah
- Location within Queensland
- Location: Queensland
- Coordinates: 16.1877°S 145.3402°E
- Area: 116.5 km^{2} (45.0 sq mi)

The northern and eastern parts of the locality of Noah are within the Daintree National Park.

The south-western part is undeveloped land.

== Flora ==
Much of the national park is covered by tropical rainforest. The Greater Daintree Rainforest has existed continuously for more than 110 million years, making it possibly the oldest existing rainforest. The persistence of this rainforest is believed to be a product of a fortuitous continental drift; after the breakup of its parent supercontinent a portion drifted toward the pole to become Antarctica, disturbing ocean currents and becoming quite chilly, while other portions were moved to hotter and drier locations. The rainforests of the parent continent preserved its climate, and so also its original trees. Tree species, once thought to be long extinct, have only relatively recently been discovered here.

== Fauna ==
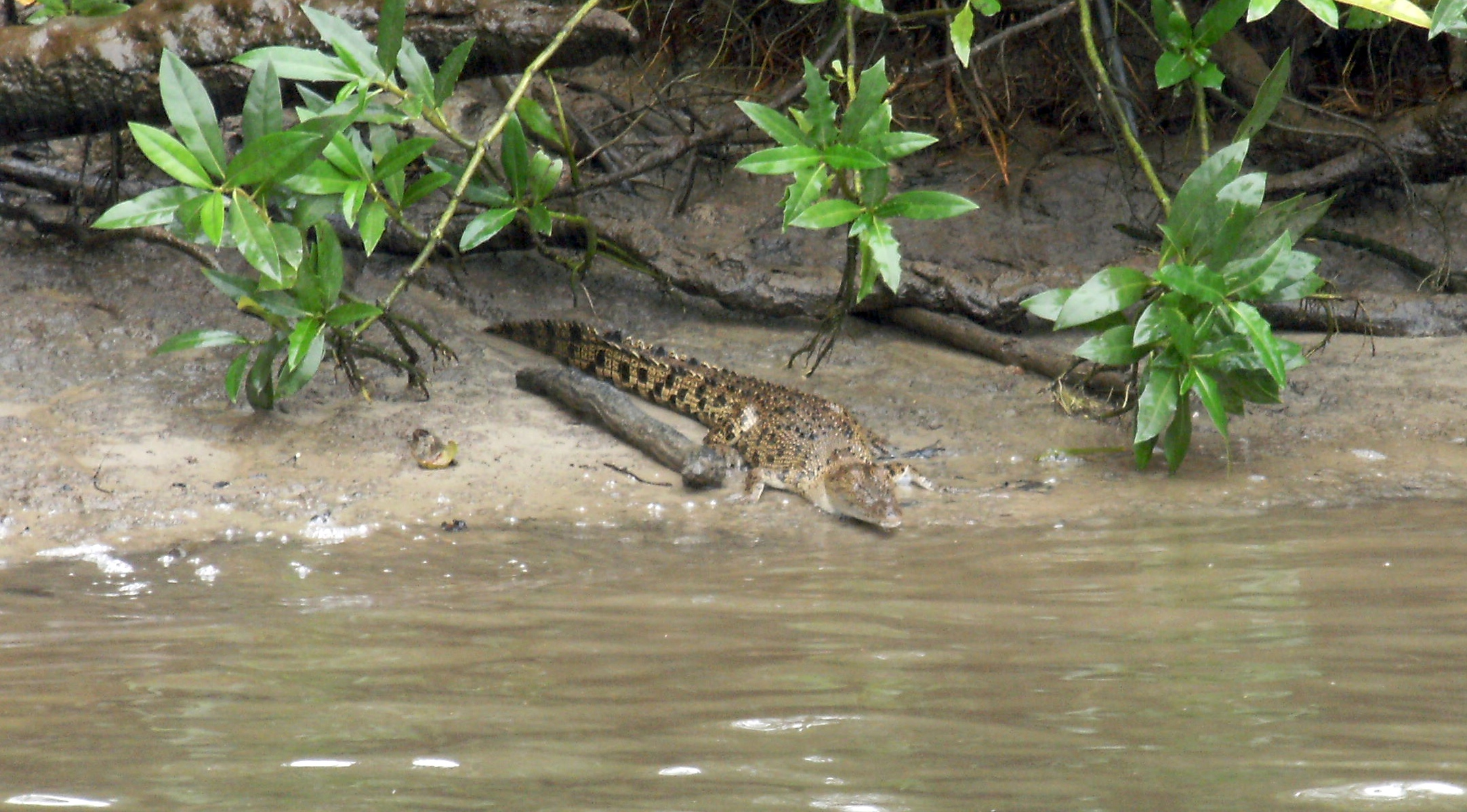
Juvenile crocodile

The park supports more than 430 bird species. The wompoo fruit-dove is one of six species of pigeon that live in the park as well as significant populations of the endangered cassowary, a flightless bird of substantial size. The buff-breasted paradise kingfisher is a seasonal visitor. Mammals include the striped possum, Daintree River ringtail possum, northern brown bandicoot, long-nosed bandicoot, musky rat-kangaroo, Bennett's tree-kangaroo, swamp wallaby, platypus and short-beaked echidna. At least 23 species of reptile and 13 species of amphibian can be found in the park. Among the reptiles present are Boyd's forest dragon, eastern water dragon, chameleon gecko, northern leaf-tailed gecko, the Australian scrub python, keelback, and the green and northern tree snakes. Frogs found in the park include the Australian lacelid, white-lipped treefrog, dainty tree frog and common mist frog. The introduced cane toad is also present in the park.

== See also ==
- Protected areas of Queensland
