= List of lighthouses in Australia =

This is a list of lighthouses and lightvessels in Australia.

Australia has a coastline of 25,760 kilometres (16,010 mi), with over 350 lighthouses and navigational aids around the Australian coastline, and a single inland lighthouse, the Point Malcolm Lighthouse.

The first lighthouse was Macquarie Lighthouse, which was lit in 1793 as a tripod mounted wood and coal fired beacon. The last staffed lighthouse was Maatsuyker Island Lighthouse, off the south coast of Tasmania, which was automated in 1996.

== Listing ==
The lighthouses and lightvessels of Australia are listed in the National Geospatial-Intelligence Agency List of Lights publication 111. They are listed by the United Kingdom Hydrographic Office on volume K of the Admiralty List of Lights & Fog Signals. The ARLHS World List of Lights lists them with the prefix "AUS".

On The Lighthouse Directory, the lighthouses of Australia are listed according to their location:

- Coral Sea Islands Territory
- New South Wales, including Cape St George Lighthouse which is in Jervis Bay Territory.
- Northern Territory
- Queensland's East Coast, from Townsville southwards
- Far North Queensland
- South Australia
- Tasmania
- Victoria
- Western Australia

Another listing is held by Lighthouses of Australia Inc., which lists lighthouses by state.

- Western Australia
- Northern Territory
- South Australia
- Queensland
- New South Wales
- Victoria
- Tasmania

Another list exists at Australian Lighthouses, a website which includes both an A-Z list and a list by state.

A list also exists at SeaSide Lights, which lists lighthouses by state.

- Western Australia
- Northern Territory
- South Australia
- Queensland
- New South Wales
- Victoria
- Tasmania

In order to be listed below, an active lighthouse has to appear at least in one of The Lighthouse Directory, Lighthouses of Australia Inc. or SeaSide Lights. Other lists mentioned above include many lights which are hard to describe as "lighthouses". Historical lighthouses were sometimes included when they are mentioned in other reliable sources.

== Management ==
Most of the lighthouses and lightvessels in Australia are managed by the Australian Maritime Safety Authority (AMSA), though the AMSA usually only manages the lighting equipment, with local authorities managing the lighthouses and parklands. In New South Wales the lighthouses and parklands are mostly managed by the Department of Environment, Climate Change & Water. In the Northern Territory some of the lighthouses are managed by the Darwin Port Corporation. In South Australia some of the stations are managed by the Department for Environment & Water. In Tasmania, many lighthouses are managed by the Tasmania Parks and Wildlife Service. In Victoria, harbour aids are maintained by the Port of Melbourne Corporation in the Melbourne area and by the Victorian Regional Channels Authority elsewhere, while parklands are mostly managed by Parks Victoria. In Western Australia some of the stations are managed by the Department of Parks and Wildlife.

== Lighthouses by state or territory ==
=== Jervis Bay Territory ===
Location	Name	Image	Coordinates	Established	Automated	Deactivated	Remarks
Jervis Bay Village	Cape St George Lighthouse		35°09′07″S 150°45′42″E	1860		1889	Destroyed to avoid confusion with Point Perpendicular Light.

=== New South Wales ===
There are several lighthouse siblings in the vicinity – lighthouses that were designed by the same architect around the same time, which are very similar by design. These include:

- Wollongong Breakwater Lighthouse and Warden Head Light, built 1872–1873, initiated by Edward Orpen Moriarty MA MInstCE
- Crowdy Head Light, Fingal Head Light, Clarence River Light (the original, now demolished), Tacking Point Lighthouse and Richmond River Light, designed by James Barnet in 1878
- Point Perpendicular Light (1899), Cape Byron Light (1901) and Norah Head Light (1903), designed by Charles Assinder Harding
- Bradleys Head Light (1905) and Robertson Point Light (1910)
- The "Disney Castles", Grotto Point Light, Parriwi Head Light, Vaucluse Bay Range Front Light and Vaucluse Bay Range Rear Light, built 1910–1911 by Maurice Festu
- The "Wedding Cakes", Eastern Channel Pile Light and Western Channel Pile Light built in 1924

Location	Name	Image	Coordinates	Year established	Year automated	Status	Remarks
Balgowlah Heights	Grotto Point Light		33.8177°S 151.2615°E	1911		active	
Ballina	Richmond River Light		28.8670°S 153.5918°E	1866	1920	active	
Bradleys Head	Bradleys Head Light		33.8536°S 151.2467°E	1905		active	
Burrewarra Point	Burrewarra Point Light		35.8339°S 150.2336°E	1974	1974	active	Solar powered
Cape Byron	Cape Byron Light		28.63854°S 153.6364°E	1901		active	
Cremorne Point	Robertson Point Light		33.8487°S 151.2330°E	1910		active	
Crowdy Head	Crowdy Head Light		31.84344°S 152.7536°E	1878	1928	active	
Culburra Beach	Crookhaven Heads Light		34.89914°S 150.77024°E	1882		Inactive	Solar powered
Fingal Head	Fingal Head Light		28.200°S 153.5708°E	1872	1920	active	
Fort Denison	Fort Denison Light		33.8546°S 151.2260°E	1913		active	
Green Cape	Green Cape Lighthouse		37.2614°S 150.0493°E	1883	1983	1997	replaced with solar powered light tower
Kiama	Kiama Light		34.6718°S 150.8626°E	1887	1920	active	
Kurnell	Cape Bailey Light		34.0352°S 151.2222°E	1950		active	
Montague Island	Montague Island Light		36.2520°S 150.2264°E	1881	1986	active	Solar powered
Mosman	Parriwi Head Light		33.8121°S 151.2463°E	1911		active	
Nelson Bay	Nelson Head Light		32.7104°S 152.1614°E	1872	1984	2003	
Newcastle	Nobbys Head Light		32.9185°S 151.7984°E	1854	1935	active	
Norah Head	Norah Head Light		33.2816°S 151.5764°E	1903	1995	active	
North Solitary Island	North Solitary Island Light		29.9246°S 153.3897°E	1975		active	Fibreglass structure; solar powered
Palm Beach	Barrenjoey Head Lighthouse		33.5801°S 151.3298°E	1855	1932	active	
Point Perpendicular	Point Perpendicular Light		35.0939°S 150.8044°E	1899		1993	replaced with solar powered light tower
Point Stephens	Point Stephens Light		32.7470°S 152.2014°E	1862	1989	active	Solar powered
Port Jackson	Eastern Channel Pile Light		33.8418°S 151.2718°E	1924		active	
Port Jackson	Western Channel Pile Light		33.8379°S 151.2629°E	1924		active	
Port Macquarie	Tacking Point Lighthouse		31.4754°S 152.9372°E	1879	1919	active	
Shark Island	Shark Island Light		33.8565°S 151.2572°E	1913		active	
Smoky Cape	Smoky Cape Lighthouse		30.9230°S 153.0877°E	1891	1988	active	
Seal Rocks	Sugarloaf Point Light		32.4409°S 152.5392°E	1875	1987	active	External stairs
South Solitary Island	South Solitary Island Light		30.2067°S 153.2674°E	1880	1975	active	Solar powered
Ulladulla	Warden Head Light		35.3655°S 150.4909°E	1873	1920	active	Battery powered, relocated
Vaucluse	Macquarie Lighthouse		33.8539°S 151.2851°E	1793	1976	active	Australia's first lighthouse
Vaucluse	Vaucluse Bay Range Front Light		33.8495°S 151.2739°E	1884		active	
Vaucluse	Vaucluse Bay Range Rear Light		33.8582°S 151.2729°E	1884		active	
Watsons Bay	Hornby Lighthouse		33.8335°S 151.2809°E	1858	1933	active	
Wollongong	Wollongong Breakwater Lighthouse		34.4196°S 150.9067°E	c.1870		1974	
Wollongong	Wollongong Head Lighthouse		34.4219°S 150.9097°E	1936	1936	active	
Yamba	Clarence River Light		29.4324°S 153.3639°E	1866	1920	active	Battery powered

=== Northern Territory ===
Most of the lighthouses in the Northern Territory were constructed by the Commonwealth Lighthouse Service during the "Golden Age of Australian Lighthouses", between 1913 and 1920. These include Cape Don Light, East Vernon Light, Emery Point Light, Cape Hotham Light and Cape Fourcroy.

Of these five, three can be considered "siblings", Cape Hotham Light, Emery Point Light and Cape Fourcroy Light. They are almost identical white square skeletal towers, and they also share a similar light characteristic, three flashes every 15 second (Fl.(3) 15s).

Location	Name	Image	Coordinates	Year established	Year automated	Status	Remarks
Cobourg Peninsula	Cape Don Light		11.30786°S 131.76515°E	1917	1983	active	solar powered
Cape Fourcroy	Cape Fourcroy Light		11.79747°S 130.02434°E			active	
Clarence Strait	Cape Hotham Light		12.04644°S 131.28946°E	1928		active	
East Vernon Island	East Vernon Light		12.07722°S 131.09531°E	1928		active	
Larrakeyah Barracks	Emery Point Light		12.45382°S 130.81555°E	1900		active	
Cox Peninsula	Point Charles Light		12.38929°S 130.63068°E	1893	1933	active	survived cyclone Tracy; solar powered

=== Queensland ===
Most lighthouses in Queensland were constructed in well established groups:

- Two lighthouses constructed using bolted prefabricated segments of cast iron: Sandy Cape Light and Bustard Head Light.
- Eight lighthouses made of hardwood frame clad with corrugated iron: Little Sea Hill Light, Grassy Hill Light, Goods Island Light, Bay Rock Light, Old Caloundra Light, North Point Hummock Light (demolished), Gatcombe Head Light (demolished) and Bulwer Island Light.
- Seven concrete towers erected between 1964 and 1979: Cape Capricorn Light, New Caloundra Light, Point Danger Light, New Burnett Heads Light, Fitzroy Island Light, Point Cartwright Light and Archer Point Light.

Location	Name	Image	Coordinates	Year established	Year automated	Status	Remarks
Big Woody Island	Middle Bluff Lighthouse		25.2989629°S 152.972167°E	1866	1959	1987	Gas, from 1985 solar power
Big Woody Island	North Bluff Lighthouse		25.2756738°S 152.9491617°E	1867	1959	1987	Gas, from 1985 solar power
Booby Island	Booby Island Light		10.6042°S 141.9100°E	1890	1991	active	generator powered
Bulwer Island	Bulwer Island Light		27.4815°S 153.0266°E	1912		1983	not original site
Burnett Heads	New Burnett Heads Light		24.7582°S 152.4126°E	1971	1971	active	
Burnett Heads	Old Burnett Heads Light		24.7637°S 152.4091°E	1873	1932	1971	
Bustard Head	Bustard Head Light		24.0223°S 151.7644°E	1869	1985	active	
Caloundra	New Caloundra Light		26.8015°S 153.1374°E	1968	1969	1997	
Caloundra	Old Caloundra Light		26.8016°S 153.1374°E	1896	1942	1968	
Cape Bowling Green	Cape Bowling Green Light		19.3262°S 147.4256°E	1874	1920	active	original moved
Cape Capricorn	Cape Capricorn Light		23.4863°S 151.2361°E	1875		active	
Cape Cleveland	Cape Cleveland Light		19.1829°S 147.0154°E	1879		active	
Cape Moreton	Cape Moreton Light		27.0319°S 153.4659°E	1857		active	
Cleveland	New Cleveland Point Light		27.51018°S 153.28909°E	1976		active	
Cleveland	Old Cleveland Point Light		27.5102°S 153.2890°E	1847		1976	experimented with laser lighthouse in 1969
Cooktown	Archer Point Light		15.5936°S 145.3285°E	1883	1979	active	
Cooktown	Grassy Hill Light		15.4606°S 145.2553°E	1886	1927	active	
Comboyuro Point	Comboyuro Point Light		27.06164°S 153.36263°E	1874	1954	1960	Collapsed
Cowan Cowan Point	Cowan Cowan Point Light		27.13655°S 153.36282°E	1873	1950		Demolished
Creal Reef	Creal Reef Light		20.533973°S 150.38051°E	1985		active	
Curtis Island	Sea Hill Light		23.490931°S 150.980414°E	1876		2006	First lighthouse now at Gladstone Maritime Museum
Dent Island	Dent Island Light		20.3692°S 148.9289°E	1879	1987	active	
Double Island Point	Double Island Point Light		25.9362°S 153.1907°E	1884	1992	active	
Eborac Island	Eborac Island Light		10.682116°S 142.533649°E			active	
Fitzroy Island	Fitzroy Island Light		16.9261°S 146.0020°E	1943		1992	
Flat Top Island	Flat Top Island Light		21.1615°S 149.2464°E	1879	1920	2007	
Goods Island	Goods Island Light		10.5654°S 142.1494°E	1886		active	
Gulf of Carpentaria	CLS-4 Carpentaria		27.481317°S 153.026867°E	1918		1985	Lightship; not in service
Lady Elliot Island	Lady Elliot Island Light		24.1146°S 152.7116°E	1873		active	
Low Island	Low Isles Light		16.3840°S 145.5598°E	1878	1993	active	
Mooloolaba	Point Cartwright Light		26.6797°S 153.1384°E	1978	1978	active	
Moreton Bay	Moreton Bay Pile Light		27.3109°S 153.2104°E	1884	1952	1966–1967	Structure destroyed in 1949
North Reef	North Reef Light		23.1855°S 151.9037°E	1878	1978	active	
Pine Islet	Pine Islet Light		21.6575°S 150.2166°E	1885		1985	relocated; last working kerosene lighthouse in the world
Point Danger	Captain Cook Memorial Light		28.1650°S 153.5507°E	1971	1971	active	experimented with laser lighthouse in 1971
Point Lookout	Point Lookout Light		27.4316°S 153.5404°E	1932		active	
Sandy Cape	Sandy Cape Light		24.7299°S 153.2086°E	1870	1991	active	
Townsville	Bay Rock Light		19.1168°S 146.7529°E	1886	1930	c.1992	
Townsville	Wharton Reef Light		19.2599°S 146.8217°E	1915	1915	1990	not original site
Wyborn Reef	Wyborn Reef Light		10.819185°S 142.77493°E		1938	active	

=== South Australia ===
Location	Name	Image	Coordinates	Established	Automated	Deactivated	Remarks
Althorpe Islands	Althorpe Island Lighthouse		35.3715°S 136.8603°E	1879	1991	active	Diesel powered
Beachport	Cape Martin Lighthouse		37.4895°S 140.0125°E	1960		active	
Cape Banks	Cape Banks Lighthouse		37.8980°S 140.3763°E	1883	1928	active	
Cape Borda	Cape Borda Lighthouse		35.7528°S 136.5937°E	1858	1989	active	
Cape Donington	Cape Donington Lighthouse		34.7265°S 135.9939°E	1878		active	
Cape du Couedic	Cape du Couedic Lighthouse		36.0579°S 136.7049°E	1909	1957	active	
Cape Jaffa	Cape Jaffa Lighthouse		36.8359°S 139.8462°E	1872		1973	Screw pile; not original site
Cape Jervis	Cape Jervis Lighthouse		35.6037°S 138.0945°E	1871	1972	active	
Cape Spencer	Cape Spencer Lighthouse		35.2988°S 136.8827°E	1950	1975	active	
Cape St Albans	Cape St Albans Lighthouse		35.8036°S 138.1248°E	1908	1908	active	
Cape Willoughby	Cape Willoughby Lighthouse		35.8428°S 138.1327°E	1852	1974	2003	South Australia's first lighthouse
Corny Point	Corny Point Lighthouse		34.8965°S 137.0104°E	1882	1920	active	
Marino	Marino Rocks Lighthouse		35.0536°S 138.5117°E	1962	1962	active	
Penguin Island	Penguin Island Lighthouse		37.4979°S 140.0136°E	1878	1918	1960	Abandoned
Point Lowly	Point Lowly Lighthouse		32.9996°S 137.7853°E	1883	1973	1993	
Point Malcolm	Point Malcolm Lighthouse		35.5089°S 139.1909°E	1878		1931	Australia's only inland lighthouse; reactivated
Port Adelaide	Port Adelaide Lighthouse		34.8424°S 138.5042°E	1869		1901	Not original site; lit on Saturdays
Port Macdonnell	Cape Northumberland Lighthouse		38.0563°S 140.6674°E	1882	1990	active	
Cape Northumberland	Old Macdonnell Lighthouse		38.0563°S 140.6674°E	1859		1881	destroyed
Robe	Robe Lighthouse		37.164367°S 139.744417°E	1972	1972	active	
Semaphore	Semaphore Timeball		34.838583°S 138.480722°E	1875		active	
South Neptune Island	South Neptune Island Lighthouse		35.3375°S 136.1177°E	1901	c.1990	active	New tower
Tiparra Reef	Tipara Reef Screw Pile		33.9297°S 137.6263°E	1877		1995	Not original site
Troubridge Hill	Troubridge Hill Lighthouse		35.1663°S 137.6408°E	1980	1980	active	
Troubridge Island	Troubridge Island Lighthouse		35.1170°S 137.8276°E	1856	1981	2001	Under threat from erosion
West Cape	West Cape Lighthouse		35.2442°S 136.8241°E	1980	1980	active	Built of stainless steel
Wonga Shoal	Wonga Shoal Lighthouse		34.8233°S 138.4376°E	1901		1912	Destroyed

=== Tasmania ===
Location	Name	Image	Coordinates	Established	Automated	Deactivated	Remarks
Bluff Hill			41.0090°S 144.6101°E	1982	1982	active	
Cape Bruny	Cape Bruny Lighthouse		43.4910°S 147.1424°E	1838		1996	
Cape Forrestier	Cape Forrestier Lighthouse		42.179944°S 148.356139°E			1971	Dismantled
Cape Sorell	Cape Sorell Lighthouse		42.1978°S 145.1693°E	1899		active	
Cape Tourville	Cape Tourville Lighthouse		42.1226°S 148.3427°E	1971	1971	active	
Cape Wickham	Cape Wickham Lighthouse		39.5885°S 143.9429°E	1861	1918	active	Tallest in Australia
Currie Harbour	Currie Lighthouse		39.9293°S 143.8422°E	1880		active	deactivated 1989–1995
Deal Island	Deal Island Lighthouse		39.4943°S 147.3225°E	1848	1921	1992	Australia's highest lighthouse
Eddystone Point			40.9931°S 148.3478°E	1889		active	
Goose Island	Goose Island Lighthouse		40.3116°S 147.8013°E	1846	1931	active	
Hells Gate	Bonnet Island Lighthouse		42.2232°S 145.2219°E	1892	1910	active	
Hells Gate	Entrance Island Lighthouse		42.2108°S 145.2154°E	1892	1910	active	
Highland Bluff (new)			40.7386°S 145.2901°E			active	
Highland Bluff (old)			40.7663°S 145.2985°E	1924			
Iron Pot	Iron Pot Lighthouse		43.0587°S 147.4172°E	1832		active	Tasmania's first lighthouse
Low Head	Low Head Lighthouse		41.0553°S 146.7889°E	1833	1995	active	Tasmania's second lighthouse
Low Head	Middle Channel Lighthouse		41.0797°S 146.8074°E	1882	1955	active	
Low Head	She Oak Point Lighthouse		41.0777°S 146.8040°E	1882	1955	active	
Maatsuyker Island	Maatsuyker Island Lighthouse		43.6570°S 146.2714°E	1891		1996	Last staffed lighthouse; Australia's most southern
Mersey Bluff			41.1587°S 146.3554°E	1889	1920	active	
Point Home Lookout	Point Home Lookout Lighthouse		42.5512°S 147.9537°E	1971	1971	active	
Rocky Cape			40.8545°S 145.5083°E	1968	1968	active	
Round Hill Point			41.0650°S 145.9618°E	1923	1980	active	
Sandy Cape			41.4217°S 144.7484°E	1953		active	
Swan Island			40.7277°S 148.1256°E	1845	1985	active	
Table Cape	Table Cape Lighthouse		40.9465°S 145.7290°E	1888	1920	active	
Tasman Island	Tasman Island Lighthouse		43.2395°S 148.0051°E	1906	1976	active	
West Point			40.9428°S 144.6139°E	1916		1982	Destroyed

=== Victoria ===
Location	Name	Image	Coordinates	Established	Automated	Deactivated	Remarks
Aireys Inlet	Split Point Lighthouse		38.4680°S 144.1044°E	1891	1919	active	
Cape Liptrap	Cape Liptrap Lighthouse		38.9021°S 145.9167°E	1913	1913	active	
Cape Nelson	Cape Nelson Lighthouse		38.4310°S 141.5423°E	1884	1995	active	
Cape Otway	Cape Otway Lighthouse		38.8568°S 143.5118°E	1848		1994	Replaced with a solar powered light tower
Cape Schanck	Cape Schanck Lighthouse		38.4927°S 144.8862°E	1859		active	
Citadel Island	Citadel Island Lighthouse		39.1143°S 146.2367°E	1913		1982	Solar powered
Cliffy Island	Cliffy Island Lighthouse		38.9506°S 146.7056°E	1884	1971	active	Solar powered
Gabo Island	Gabo Island Lighthouse		37.5687°S 149.9169°E	1853	1993	active	Solar powered
Gellibrand Shoal	Gellibrand Pile Light		37.8785°S 144.9147°E	1906		1976	Destroyed
Griffiths Island	Port Fairy Lighthouse		38.3909°S 142.2552°E	1859		active	Wind powered
Lady Bay Lower	Lady Bay Lower Lighthouse		38.3907°S 142.4854°E	1854		active	
Lady Bay Upper	Lady Bay Upper Lighthouse		38.3903°S 142.4854°E	1859		active	Not original site
McCrae	Eastern Lighthouse		38.3483°S 144.9279°E	1854		1994	
Point Hicks	Point Hicks Lighthouse		37.8018°S 149.2753°E	1890		active	
Point Lonsdale	Point Lonsdale Lighthouse		38.2919°S 144.6139°E	1863		active	
Portland	Whaler's Bluff Lighthouse		38.3373°S 141.6091°E	1889		active	
Portland	Portland Bay Lighthouse		38.3542°S 141.6198°E	1859		1889	
Port Melbourne	Port Melbourne Front Light		37.8417°S 144.9293°E	1924			
Port Melbourne	Port Melbourne Rear Light		37.8371°S 144.9294°E	1924		active	
Port Phillip	South Channel Pile Light		38.3386°S 144.8186°E	1874		1985	relocated and reactivated
Port Phillip	West Channel Pile Light		38.1927°S 144.7563°E	1881		active	
Queenscliff	Queenscliff High Light		38.2715°S 144.6618°E	1843		active	Built of bluestone
Queenscliff	Queenscliff Low Light		38.2737°S 144.6593°E	1854		active	Not original site
Warrnambool	Lady Bay Upper Lighthouse		38.38958°S 142.48578°E	1858		active	
Williamstown	Timeball Lighthouse		37.8668°S 144.9126°E	1840	1934	1987	Light deactivated; time ball active
Wilsons Promontory	Wilsons Promontory Lighthouse		39.1299°S 146.4242°E	1859	1975	active	Furthest south on mainland

=== Western Australia ===
Location	Name	Image	Coordinates	Established	Automated	Deactivated	Remarks
Adele Island			15.5101°S 123.1574°E	1951		active	
Arthur Head	Arthur Head Lighthouse		32.0566°S 115.7400°E	1851		1902	Demolished
	Bessieres Island Lighthouse		21.6362°S 115.1118°E	1913		active	
Breaksea Island	Breaksea Island Lighthouse		35.0642°S 118.0573°E	1858		active	
Bunbury	Casuarina Point Lighthouse		33.3191°S 115.6330°E	1870		active	
Caffarelli Island	Caffarelli Island Lighthouse		16.0461°S 123.2858°E	1967		active	
Cape Bossut	Cape Bossut Lighthouse		18.7137°S 121.6227°E	1913		c.1980	demolished
Cape Leeuwin	Cape Leeuwin Lighthouse		34.3750°S 115.1362°E	1896	1992	active	
Cape Leveque	Cape Leveque Lighthouse		16.3949°S 122.9282°E	1911		active	
Cape Naturaliste	Cape Naturaliste Lighthouse		33.53750°S 115.01889°E	1903	1978	active	struck by ball lightning in 1907
Carnarvon	Babbage Island Lighthouse		24.8760°S 113.6309°E	1965		active	
Cave Point	Cave Point Lighthouse		35.1202°S 117.8990°E	1976		1994	
Dirk Hartog Island	Cape Inscription Lighthouse		25.4818°S 112.9720°E	1910	1917	active	
East Island	East Island Lighthouse		16.9024°S 122.1979°E	1968		active	
Eclipse Island	Eclipse Island Lighthouse		35.1821°S 117.8847°E	1926	1976	active	replaced with beacon
Escape Island	Escape Island Lighthouse		30.3334°S 114.9864°E	1930		active	
Fremantle	North Mole Lighthouse		32.0538°S 115.7245°E	1906		active	
Fremantle	South Mole Lighthouse		32.0558°S 115.7325°E	1903		active	
Gantheaume Point	Gantheaume Point Lighthouse		17.9741°S 122.1775°E	1905	1922	active	
Geraldton	Point Moore Lighthouse		28.7827°S 114.5793°E	1878	1985	active	
Guilderton	Guilderton Lighthouse		31.3394°S 115.4921°E	1983	1983	active	
Hillarys			31.8235°S 115.7336°E	1986		active	
Jarman Island	Jarman Island Lighthouse		20.6585°S 117.2174°E	1888	1917	1985	
Legendre Island	Legendre Island Lighthouse		20.3584°S 116.8427°E	1927	1989	active	
Mosman Park	Buckland Hill Lighthouse		32.01708°S 115.76097°E	c.1970		active	
North West Cape	North West Cape Light		21.8156°S 114.1534°E	1967		active	on radio tower
Pelsart Island	Pelsart Island Lighthouse		28.9854°S 113.9623°E	1974		active	
Point Cloates	Point Cloates Lighthouse		22.7090°S 113.6808°E	1910	1933	1936	Ruins, heritage listed
Point King	Point King Lighthouse		35.0354°S 117.9189°E	1858		1911	Ruins, heritage listed
Quobba Point	Quobba Point Light		24.4797°S 113.4181°E	1950		active	
Rottnest Island	Bathurst Lighthouse		31.9893°S 115.5406°E	1900	1986	active	
Rottnest Island	Wadjemup Lighthouse		32.0072°S 115.5041°E	1851	1986	active	Australia's first rotating beam lighthouse
Woodman Point	Woodman Light		32.1309°S 115.7697°E	1902	1955	active	

== See also ==
- List of lighthouses in the Coral Sea Islands
- Lists of lighthouses
