= Escape Island Lighthouse =

Lighthouse on Escape Island on coast of Western Australia

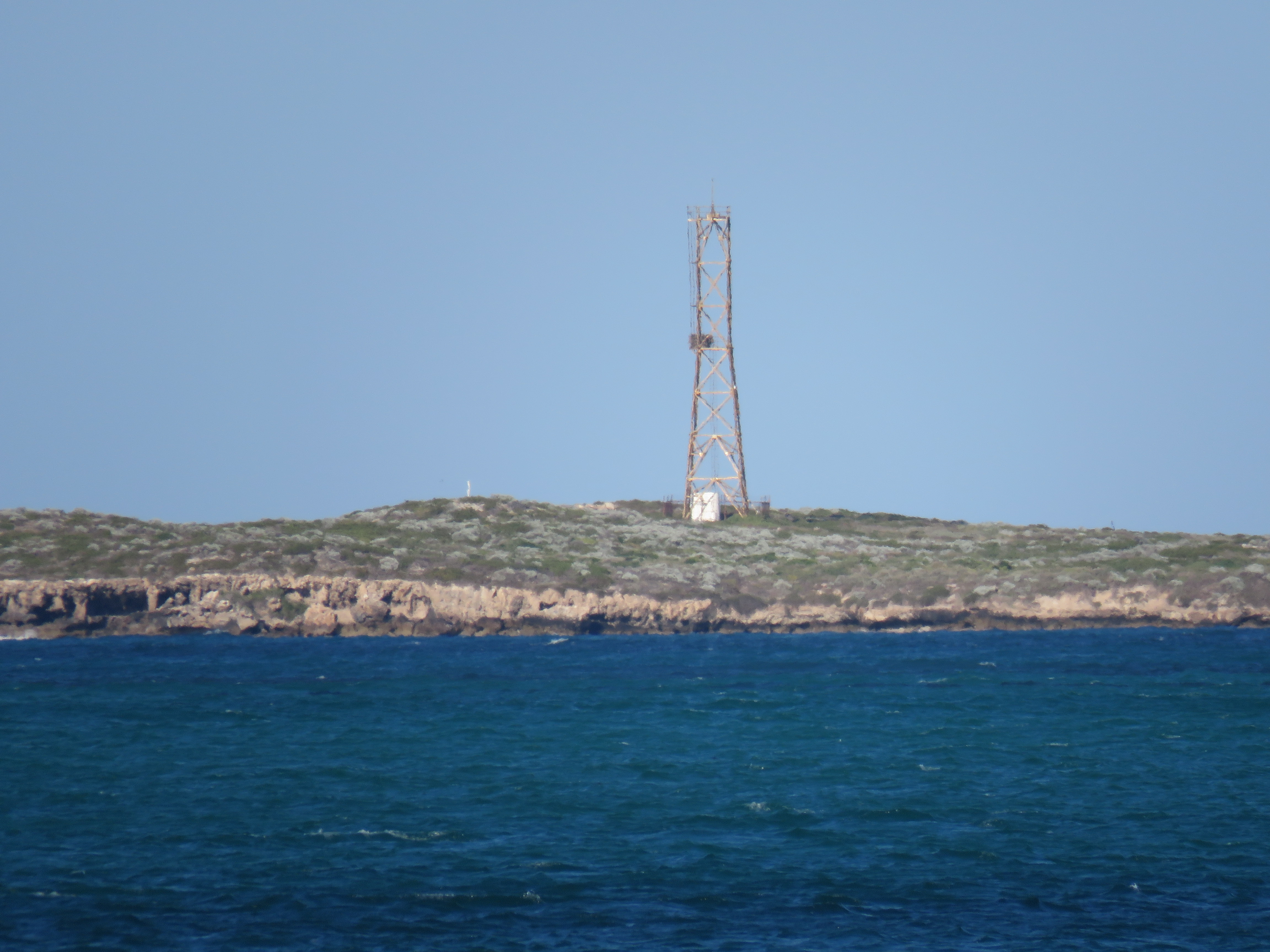
- Escape Island lighthouse seen from Jurien Bay
- Location: Escape Island, Western Australia, Australia
- Coordinates: 30°20′00″S 114°59′11″E

Tower
- Constructed: 1930 (first)
- Foundation: concrete
- Construction: metal skeletal tower
- Automated: 1980
- Height: 24 m (79 ft)
- Shape: square truncated tower with balcony
- Power source: solar power
- Operator: Australian Maritime Safety Authority

Light
- First lit: 1980 (current)
- Focal height: 30 m (98 ft)
- Range: 15 nmi (28 km; 17 mi)
- Characteristic: Fl(3) W 15s

Escape Island Lighthouse is a heritage listed 96-foot (29 m) lighthouse which was constructed in the centre of Escape Island, on the coast of Western Australia in 1930.

Initially the lighthouse had a brightness of 6000 candlepower and was visible for 15 miles (24 km). The light was a group flashing white light model, showing three flashes every fifteen seconds. Originally powered by butane gas, it was converted to solar power in 1986; it now consists of a solar powered unmanned light on top of a steel tower.

== See also ==
- List of lighthouses in Australia
