= Point Charles Light =

Lighthouse in Northern Territory, Australia

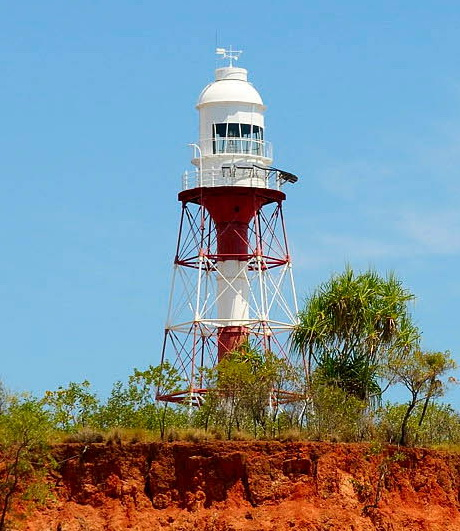
- Point Charles Light, view from sea
- Location: Cox Peninsula; Northern Territory; Australia
- Coordinates: 12°23′21.44″S 130°37′50.45″E

Tower
- Constructed: 1893
- Construction: cast wrought iron skeletal tower
- Automated: 1933
- Height: 105 feet (32 m)
- Shape: hexagonal tower with central cylinder, balcony and lantern
- Markings: red tower with a horizontal white band and white lantern
- Power source: solar power
- Operator: Australian Maritime Safety Authority

Light
- Deactivated: 1971–1974
- Focal height: 128 feet (39 m)
- Lens: 1st order Chance Brothers dioptric
- Intensity: 37,000 cd.
- Range: 17 nmi (31 km; 20 mi)
- Characteristic: Fl W 5s

Point Charles Light, known officially as the Charles Point Lighthouse, is an active lighthouse located on a headland at the northern end of the Cox Peninsula, 21 kilometres (13 mi) northwest of Port Darwin, Northern Territory, Australia. Established in 1893, it is the oldest lighthouse in the Northern Territory.

== History ==
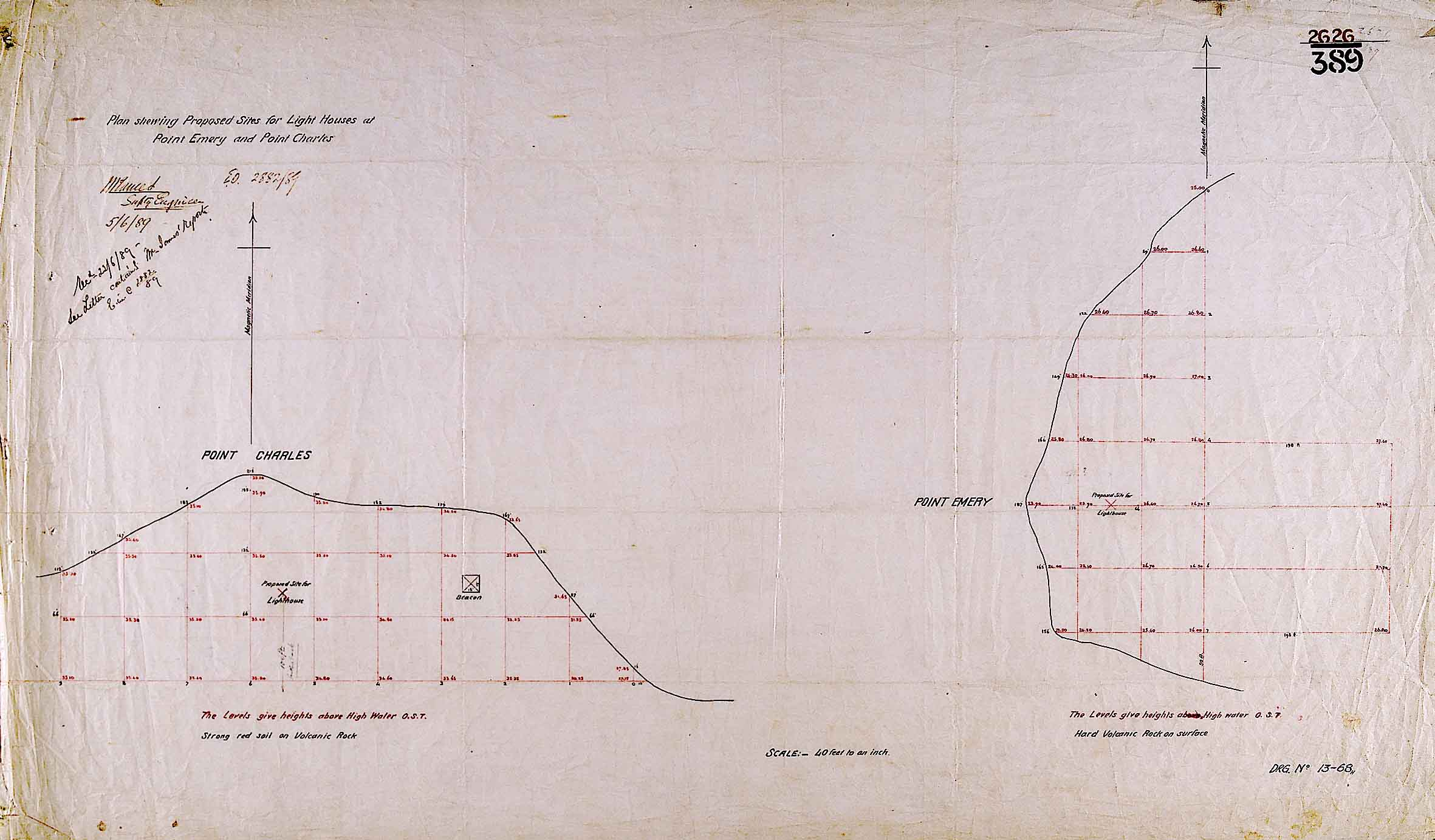
Plans from 1889 showing proposed sites for lighthouses at Point Charles and Point Emery.

Many ships were wrecked in the approach to Port Darwin in the 1880s, and the Marine Board recommended in 1888 that lights should be erected at Capes Fourcroy and Don and Points Emery and Charles. Funds for the Point Charles and Point Emery lights were raised by a loan, and the contract for the Point Charles light went to Chance Bros of Birmingham, England who packed the lighthouse in crates and shipped it to Adelaide in 1891. The contents were shipped aboard the SS Inaminka to Port Darwin, and after a short period by the SS Airie to Point Charles, where construction began in 1892. Though the construction was to be finished before 8 September 1892, the rusty condition of the lighthouse when it was unpacked caused a delay, and the lighthouse was officially opened on 1 February 1893 by Charles James Dashwood, the Government Resident of the Northern Territory of the day.

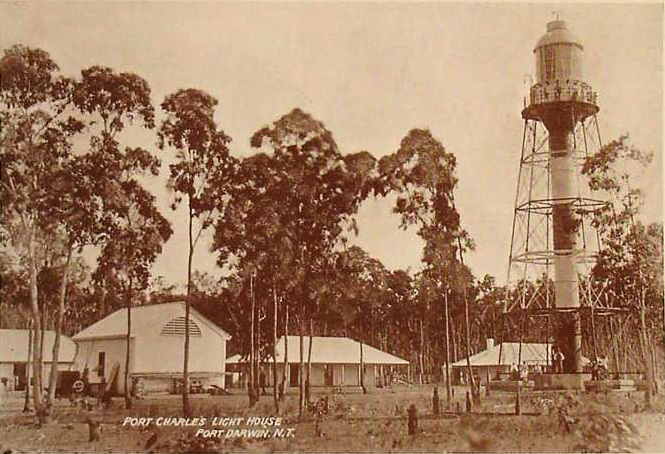
Historic view of Point Charles Light, circa 1910. Lighthouse keepers' cottages are also visible.

The 92 feet (28 m) tower was constructed of wrought iron, and consisted of a central tube almost 2 metres (6 ft 7 in) in diameter, with struts and braces. A spiral staircase inside the tube leads to the lantern room on top of the gallery. The lantern housed a revolving 1st order dioptric lens, and the original light source was a vapourised kerosene burner, producing a light intensity of 100,000 cd. The burners were replaced by "Trinity" burners in 1894 due to an insect problem. The light characteristic was one white flash every 30 seconds, with red and green sectors (Fl.W.R.G. 30s). The focal height was 36 metres (118 ft), and the light was visible for 17 nautical miles (31 km; 20 mi), including from Darwin.

Several galvanised iron lighthouse keepers' cottages were also constructed, with wooden floors and verandahs.

In 1932, a decision was made to change the light source to acetylene gas (carbide lamp) and automate the lighthouse. The lighthouse was automated and demanned in 1933, and continued to work automatically until 1971. In 1965, Radio Australia installed tall transmission masts at the area with powerful lamps atop them. These were visible for 22 nautical miles (41 km; 25 mi) and made the lighthouse obsolete. In 1971 the light was extinguished and the tower became a day marker. However, this was not to stay for long. On Christmas Eve 1974, Cyclone Tracy devastated the area, causing extensive damage to the Radio Australia masts. The Lighthouse survived almost intact, and within a month, a small low-powered lamp had been installed, operating on batteries.

In 1986, it was listed on the now-defunct Register of the National Estate.

In May 1982 standby diesel powered alternators were installed. In July 1982 the tower was finally fully electrified, and a powerful 1,000,000 cd lamp was installed. This was later replaced by a much lower power, but also lower cost, solar powered light.

The current light source is a solar powered 12 volt Halogen Lamp, with an intensity of 37,000 cd. The light characteristic shown is a white flash every five seconds (Fl.W. 5s). The light is visible for 17 nautical miles (31 km; 20 mi)

== Access and operation ==
The Radio Australia facility was closed in July 1997. After that, the facility was leased by the Department of Finance and Administration to the Christian Voice Broadcasting Service (CVC), which fenced the area in 2003 and prevented public access to the site. CVC's lease expired in June 2010, and as of November 2010, road access to the lighthouse is available via existing agreements with the indigenous land holders.

The light is operated by the Australian Maritime Safety Authority, which accesses the site by helicopter.

== See also ==
- List of lighthouses in Australia
