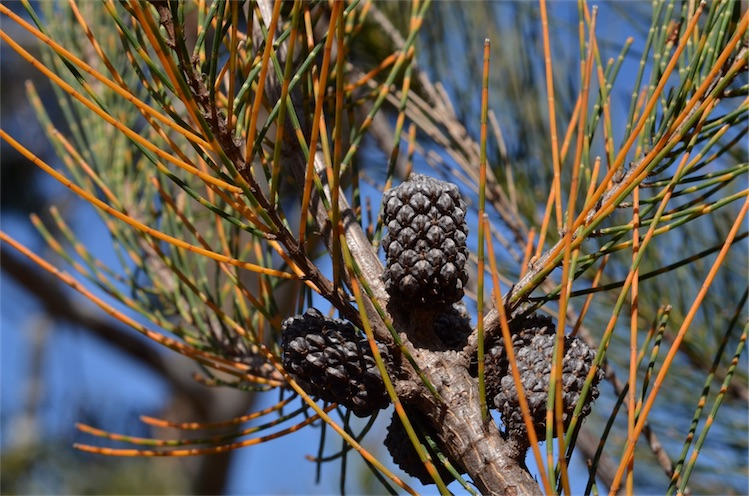
- In the Royal Tasmanian Botanical Gardens

Scientific classification
- Kingdom: Plantae
- Clade: Tracheophytes
- Clade: Angiosperms
- Clade: Eudicots
- Clade: Rosids
- Order: Fagales
- Family: Casuarinaceae
- Genus: Allocasuarina
- Species: A. duncanii

Binomial name
- Allocasuarina duncanii L.A.S.Johnson
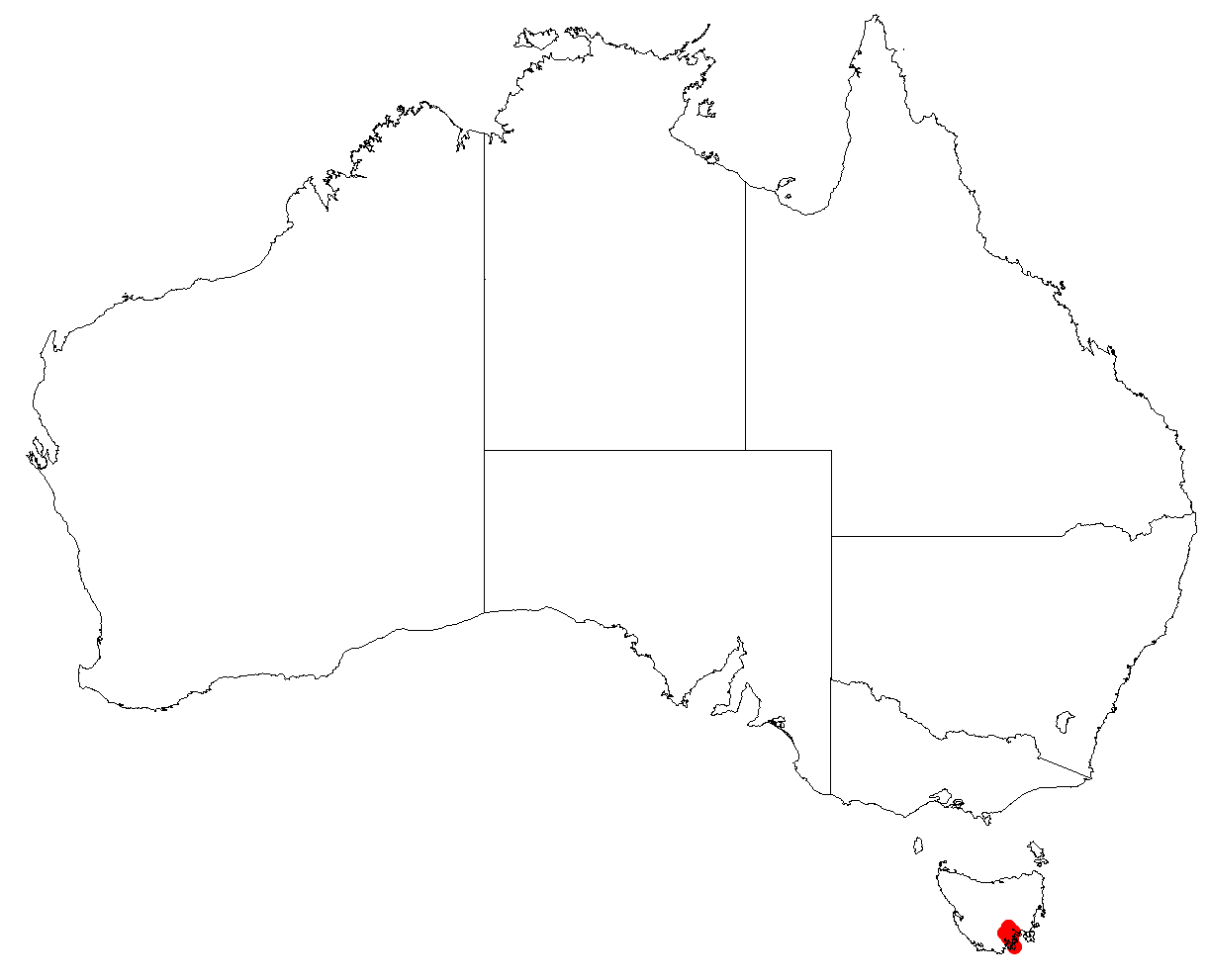
- Occurrence data from AVH

= Allocasuarina duncanii =

Species of flowering plant

Allocasuarina duncanii, commonly known as Duncan's sheoak, or conical sheoak, is a species of flowering plant in the family Casuarinaceae and is endemic to Tasmania. It is a small dioecious tree that has branchlets up to 200 mm (7.9 in) long, the leaves reduced to scales in whorls of seven to nine, and the fruiting cones 15–60 mm (0.59–2.36 in) long containing winged seeds (samaras) 6–10 mm (0.24–0.39 in) long.

== Description ==
Allocasuarina duncanii is a small, erect, dioecious tree that typically grows to a height of up to 8 m (26 ft). Its branchlets are up to 200 mm (7.9 in) long, the leaves reduced to scale-like teeth 0.8–1.5 mm (0.031–0.059 in) long, arranged in whorls of seven to nine around the branchlets. The sections of branchlet between the leaf whorls (the "articles") are 4–17 mm (0.16–0.67 in) long and 0.9–1.4 mm (0.035–0.055 in) wide. Male flowers are arranged in head-like spikes 7.5–13 mm (0.30–0.51 in) long, with six to eight whorls per centimetre (per 0.39 in.), the anthers about 1 mm (0.039 in) long. Female cones are cylindrical, on a peduncle 4–10 mm (0.16–0.39 in) long. Mature cones are 15–60 mm (0.59–2.36 in) long and 12–25 mm (0.47–0.98 in) in diameter, the samaras dark brown to black and 6–10 mm (0.24–0.39 in) long.

This sheoak is similar to A. monilifera that is mostly monoecious, and lacks the "conifer-like" habit of A duncanii.

== Taxonomy ==
Allocasuarina duncanii was first formally described in 1994 by Lawrie Johnson and Dennis Morris in the journal Telopea from specimens collected near the headwaters of the Nicholls Rivulet in 1993. The specific epithet, (duncanii) honours "Mr Fred Duncan", who brought the species to the attention of botanists.

== Distribution and habitat ==
Duncan's sheoak grows in shallow soil over dolerite, usually at altitudes above 500 m (1,600 ft), on Mount Dromedary, the Wellington Range, Snug Tiers and on South Bruny Island.

== Conservation status ==
Allocasuarina duncanii is listed as "rare" under the Tasmanian Government Threatened Species Protection Act 1995. The main threats to the species are inappropriate fire regimes, drought and climate change.
