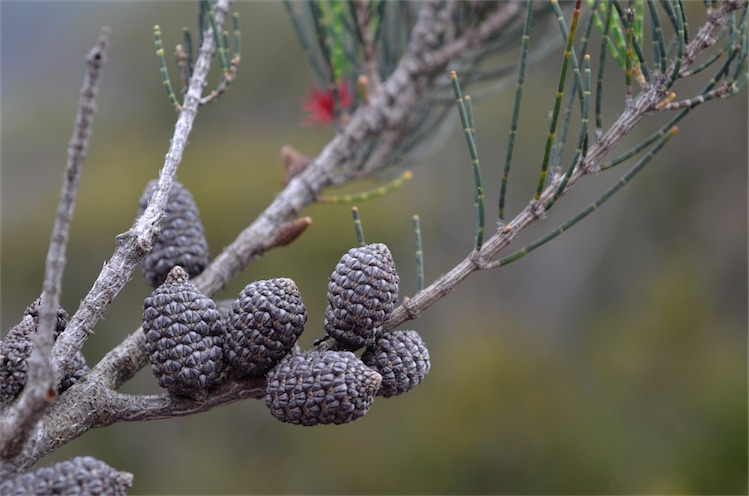

Scientific classification
- Kingdom: Plantae
- Clade: Tracheophytes
- Clade: Angiosperms
- Clade: Eudicots
- Clade: Rosids
- Order: Fagales
- Family: Casuarinaceae
- Genus: Allocasuarina
- Species: A. monilifera

Binomial name
- Allocasuarina monilifera (L.A.S.Johnson) L.A.S.Johnson
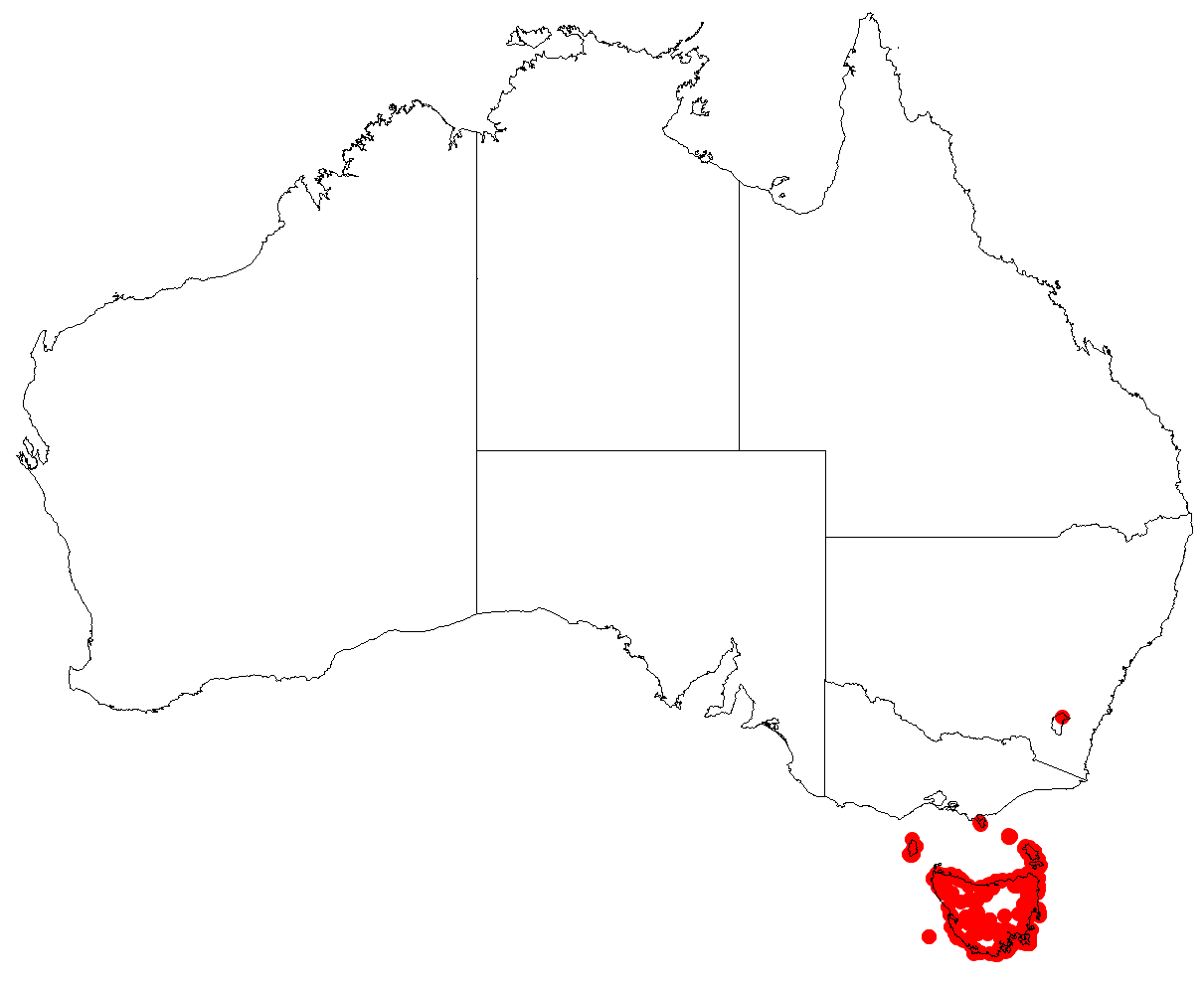
- Occurrence data from AVH

Synonyms
- Casuarina monilifera L.A.S.Johnson; Casuarina sp. 4 p.p.; Casuarina distyla auct. non Vent.: Rodway, L. (1903)

= Allocasuarina monilifera =

Species of flowering plant

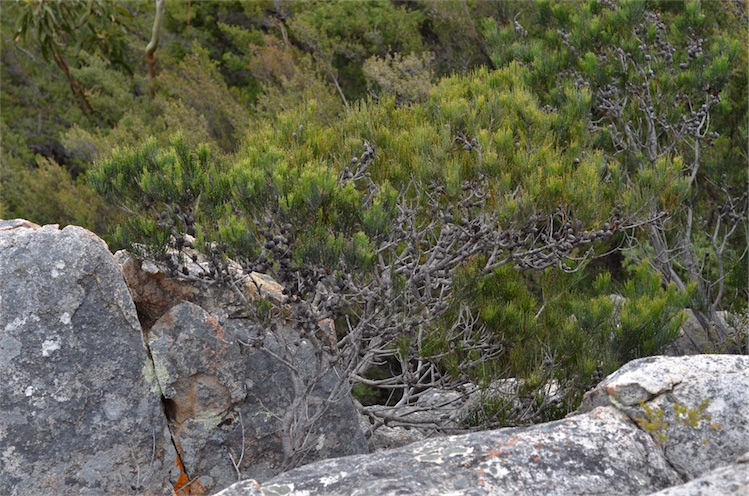
Habit near Cape Tourville Lighthouse

Allocasuarina monilifera, commonly known as necklace sheoak, is a species of flowering plant in the family Casuarinaceae and is endemic to Tasmania. It is usually a monoecious, low-growing shrub that has branchlets up to 150 mm (5.9 in) long, the leaves reduced to scales in whorls of six to nine, the fruiting cones 15–30 mm (0.59–1.18 in) long containing winged seeds 5–6 mm (0.20–0.24 in) long.

== Description ==
Allocasuarina monilifera is usually a monoecious shrub that typically grows to 0.5–4 m (1 ft 8 in – 13 ft 1 in) high and 1–4 m (3 ft 3 in – 13 ft 1 in) wide. Its branchlets are 150 mm (5.9 in) long, the leaves reduced to erect to slightly spreading, scale-like teeth 0.5–1 mm (0.020–0.039 in) long, arranged in whorls of six to nine around the branchlets. The sections of branchlet between the leaf whorls are 6–11 mm (0.24–0.43 in) long, 0.6–1.2 mm (0.024–0.047 in) wide and are slightly waxy. Male flowers are arranged in spikes 10–35 mm (0.39–1.38 in) long, the anthers 0.7–1.2 mm (0.028–0.047 in) long. Female cones are cylindrical, on a peduncle 2–10 mm (0.079–0.394 in) long. Mature cones are 15–30 mm (0.59–1.18 in) long and 8–14 mm (0.31–0.55 in) in diameter containing winged seeds 5–6 mm (0.20–0.24 in) long.

== Taxonomy ==
Necklace sheoak was first formally described in 1967 by Lawrie Johnson who gave it the name Casuarina monilifera The Student's Flora of Tasmamia from specimens he collected at Eaglehawk Neck in 1949. In 1982, Johnson transferred the species to Allocasuarina as A. monilifera in the Journal of the Adelaide Botanic Gardens. The specific epithet, (monilifera) means "necklace-bearing".

== Distribution and habitat ==
Allocasuarina monilifera grows in heath and woodland in dry coastal areas of northern and eastern Tasmania, on Flinders Island and the islands of the Kent Group in Bass Strait.
