= Point Malcolm Lighthouse =

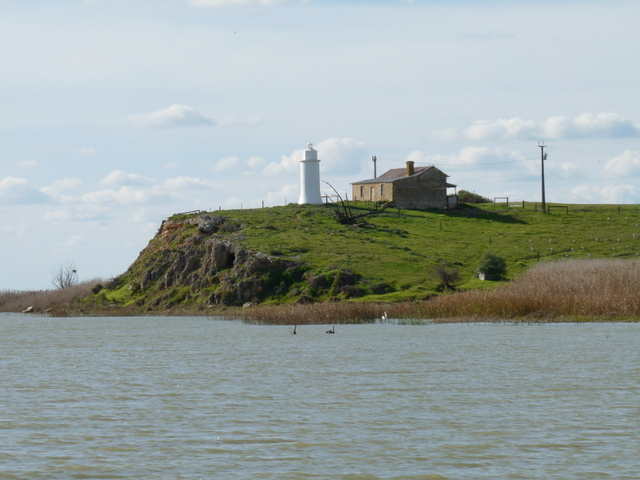
- Point Malcolm Lighthouse
- Location: Australia
- Coordinates: 35.5089°S 139.1909°E
- Constructed: 1878
- Construction: concrete
- Height: 23 feet (7.0 m)
- Shape: conical tower
- Markings: white tower and lantern

Light
- Deactivated: 1878; 1931
- Focal height: 82 feet (25 m)
- Range: 10 nautical miles (19 km; 12 mi)

Point Malcolm Lighthouse is located at the north end of the narrows connecting Lake Alexandria and Lake Albert in Southern Australia. It is situated on a cliff, 82 feet above sea level, on the east side of the narrows just north of Poltalloch Rd.

The site consists of the light and adjacent buildings, including the keepers' cottage. It is only lighthouse in the country that is inland.

== History ==
Point Malcolm Lighthouse was built in 1878 at a cost of £1,520 by Richard Trenouth. Its purpose was to assist ships going from Lake Alexandria to ports on the Murray River or to Lake Albert to deliver produce.

For 52 years it was in operation for this purpose, as well as well as being a navigation aid for boats on the lakes.

By 1931, river traffic had diminished. This was mainly due to a new bridge built for cars and trains to get across the Murray River at Edward’s Crossing. Also, the Narung ferry went into service in 1924, reducing the traffic of paddle steamers.

In 1887, the white light was changed from flashing a beam to a fixed light.

It was then turned off in September 1931. In place of the light, an automatic 'light on a pole' is now in use to guide recreational boats and any remaining commercial traffic.

Today, although intact and in fairly good condition, the keepers' cottage and other buildings are derelict and boarded up.

It is protected under the State Register of Heritage Places.

== Description ==
The tower is 7 metres tall, painted white, and is made of concrete. When still operational, the light was visible for 10 miles and revolved once every 10 seconds. At the time, it required required several gallons of mineral oil each month.

== See also ==
- List of lighthouses in Australia
