= Cape Fourcroy Light =

Lighthouse in Northern Territory, Australia

- Location: Cape Fourcroy; Northern Territory; Australia
- Coordinates: 11°47′50.81″S 130°1′27.57″E

Tower
- Constructed: 1910s
- Construction: metal skeletal tower
- Height: 49 feet (15 m)
- Shape: square pyramidal skeletal tower with balcony and lantern
- Markings: white tower and lantern
- Operator: Australian Maritime Safety Authority

Light
- Focal height: 98 feet (30 m)
- Range: 12 nautical miles (22 km; 14 mi)
- Characteristic: Fl (3) W 15s.

Cape Fourcroy Light is an active lighthouse located on Cape Fourcroy, on the southwestern tip of Bathurst Island, Northern Territory, Australia. The lighthouse marks the beginning of the route from the Timor Sea to Darwin.

The lighthouse was constructed by the Commonwealth Lighthouse Service during the "Golden Age of Australian Lighthouses", between 1913 and 1920.

The light characteristic shown is three white flashes, one every two seconds, repeating every 15 seconds (Fl.(3)W. 15s). It is visible for 12 nautical miles (22 km; 14 mi).

The site is open to the public, and tours are available from Darwin, but the tower is closed. It is operated by the Australian Maritime Safety Authority.

== See also ==
- List of lighthouses in Australia
