= Wyborn Reef Light =

Lighthouse in Queensland, Australia

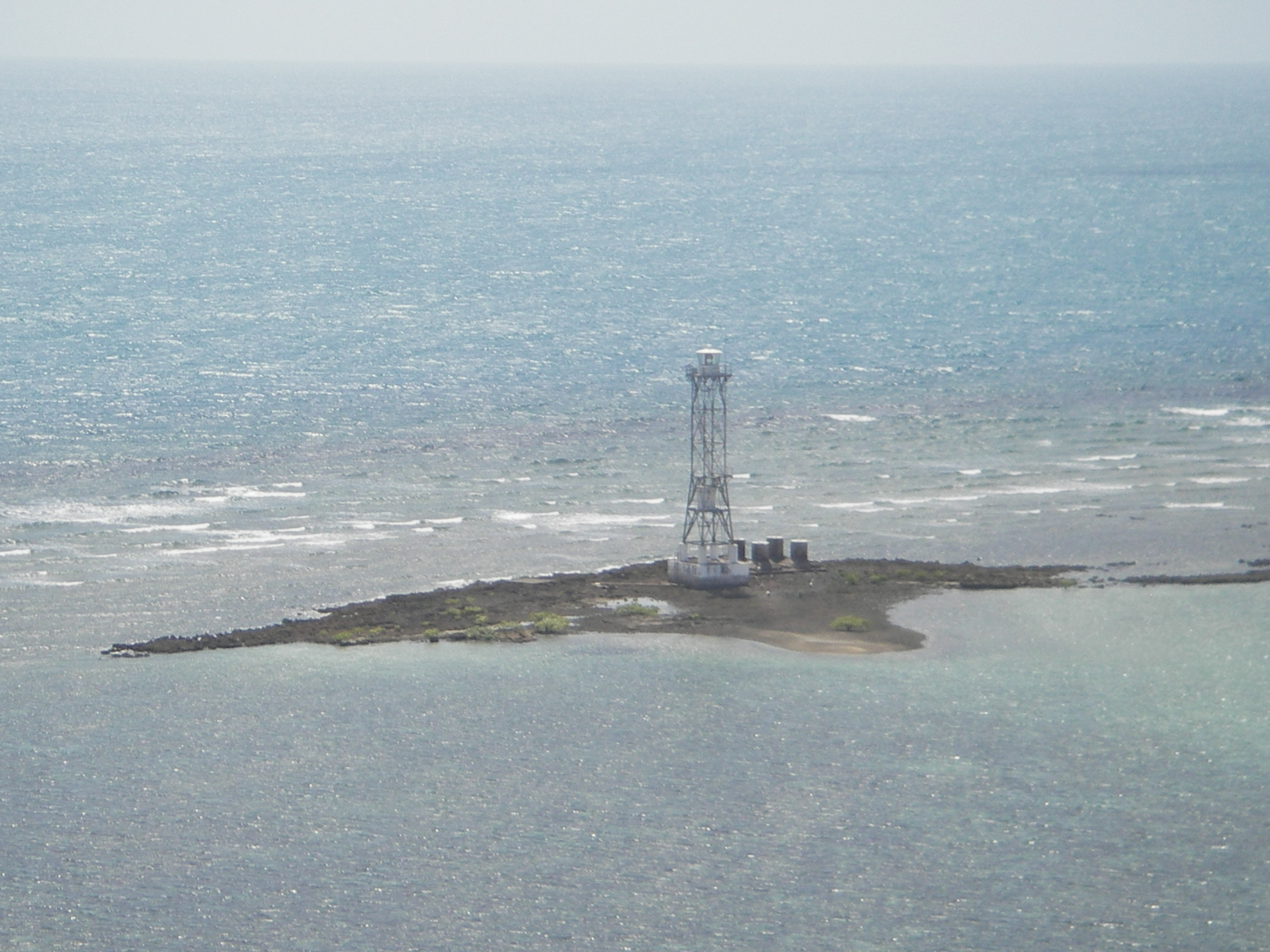
- Wyborn Reef Light aerial view
- Location: Albany Island; Queensland; Australia
- Coordinates: 10°49′08.88″S 142°46′30.02″E

Tower
- Constructed: 1938
- Foundation: concrete piles
- Construction: stainless steel skeletal tower
- Height: 69 feet (21 m)
- Shape: square tower with balcony and lantern
- Markings: white tower and lantern
- Operator: Australian Maritime Safety Authority

Light
- Focal height: 70 feet (21 m)
- Lens: Chance Brothers 375 mm catadioptric
- Intensity: white: 3,300 cd red: 660 cd
- Range: white: 11 nmi (20 km) red: 8 nmi (15 km)
- Characteristic: Fl (4) WR 20s.

Wyborn Reef Light is an active lighthouse located at Wyborn Reef, formerly known as Y Reef, about 16 kilometres (9.9 mi) southeast of Albany Island, east of the tip of Cape York Peninsula, Queensland, Australia. It marks the entrance to the Albany Passage. The lighthouse was constructed in 1938 and upgraded in 1991 and 1995. The structure is a stainless steel tower with a fiberglass hut within the framework, carrying a lantern.

== History ==
The construction of an automatic lighthouse on Y Reef was approved by the Commonwealth Lighthouse Advisory Committee on 18 August 1937. This caused some confusion since a light was already present at the similarly named Wye Reef, 120 kilometres (75 mi) to the south. The light was eventually constructed by the Public Works Department in late 1938, in difficult conditions. The 14 workers lived in tents on a 50 by 50 feet (15 m × 15 m) wooden platform, 4 feet 6 inches (1.37 m) above tiger shark infested water, with no shelter from the heat. The light was finally exhibited about 10 December of that year. It was automatic and unattended from its construction, and showed a group flashing white light characteristic.

The 1957 Admiralty List of Lights and Fog Signals lists an unmanned white light with a red sector, with a light characteristic of four flashes every twenty second (Fl.(4)W.R. 20s), identical to the current light characteristic. The intensity listed is 3,000 cd for the white light and 1,300 cd for the red one. The light was under the responsibility of the Commonwealth Lighthouse Service.

The light was converted to solar power in 1991 and upgraded in 1995. The remaining pilings from a previous lighthouse are still present next to the current one.

== Structure and display ==
The structure is a stainless steel tower skeletal tower, mounted on concrete piles, 17.5 metres (57 ft) high from the ground to the platform. The platform is topped by a gallery and a NAL-1 fibreglass white painted lantern, bringing the total height of the structure to 21 metres (69 ft). A white machinery fibreglass hut is located inside the tower framework.

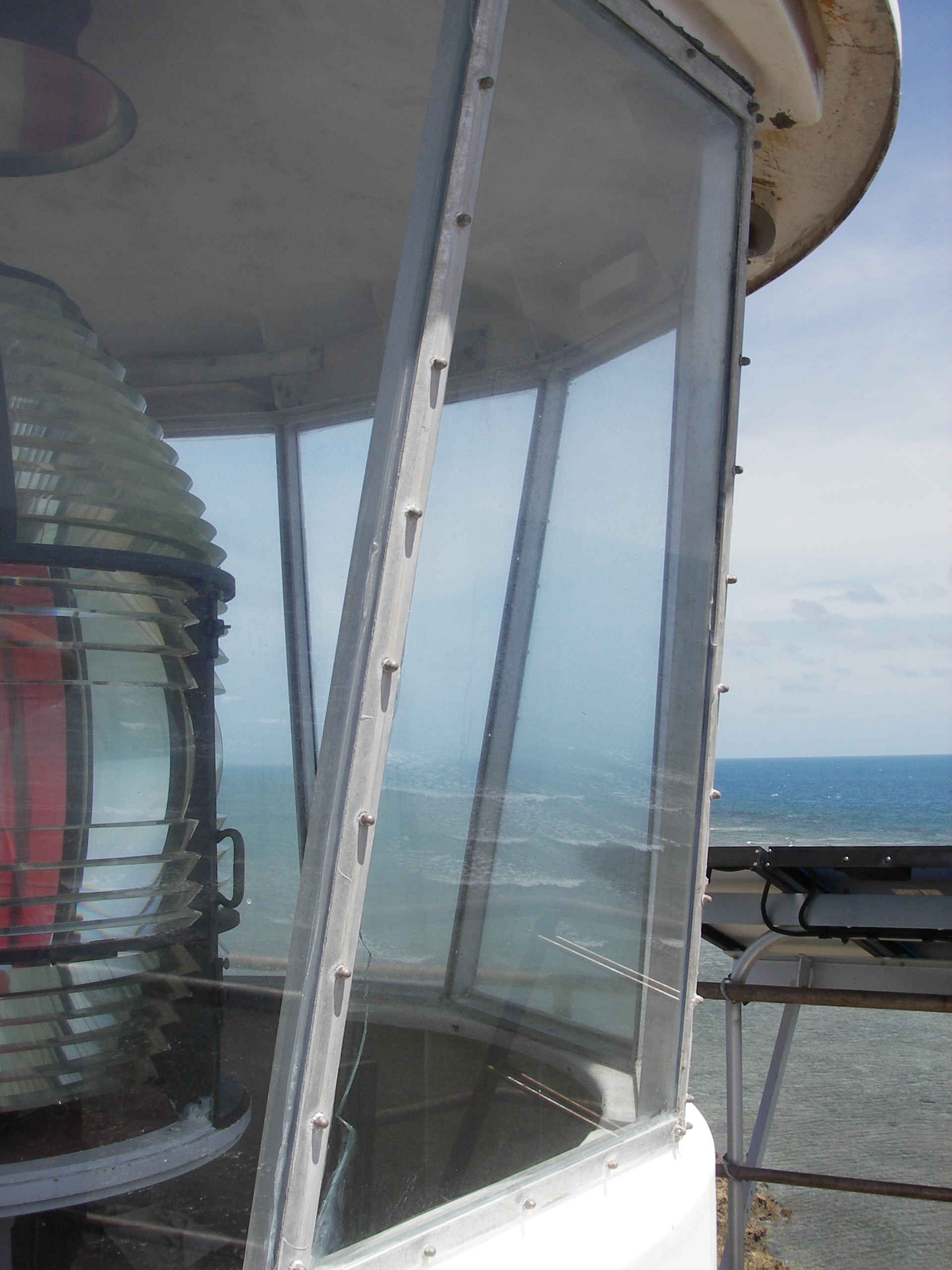
Lantern room at Wyborn Reef Light, showing the lens and the red sector

The lens inside the lantern room is a Chance Brothers 375 mm catadioptric Fresnel lens.

The current light characteristic is four flashes every twenty second, white with a red sector at 133°-143° (Fl.(4)W.R. 20s). The white flashes are visible for 11 nautical miles (20 km; 13 mi) and the red ones for 8 nautical miles (15 km; 9.2 mi). The light source is a solar powered 12 Volt 35 Watt Halogen lamp with an intensity of 3300 cd for the white light and 660 cd for the red one.

== Site operation and visiting ==
The site and the tower are operated by the Australian Maritime Safety Authority. The island is accessible only by boat, and both the site and the tower are closed to the public.

== See also ==
- List of lighthouses in Australia
