= Flat Top Island Light =

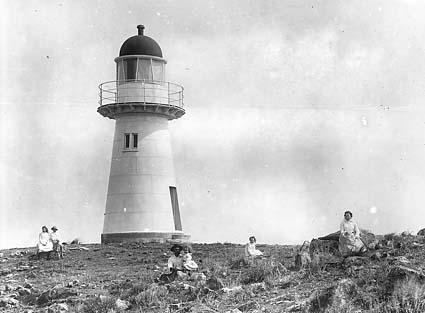
- Flat Top Island Light, 1917
- Location: Flat Top Island; Mackay; Queensland; Australia
- Coordinates: 21°09′41.4″S 149°14′48.17″E

Tower
- Constructed: 1878
- Foundation: stone and concrete tower
- Construction: timber frame clad with galvanized iron
- Automated: about 1920
- Height: 32 feet (9.8 m)
- Shape: conical tower
- Markings: white tower, red lantern dome

Light
- First lit: 1879
- Deactivated: 2007
- Focal height: 174 feet (53 m)
- Lens: 4th order
- Characteristic: Fl (4) WR 20s. (defunct)

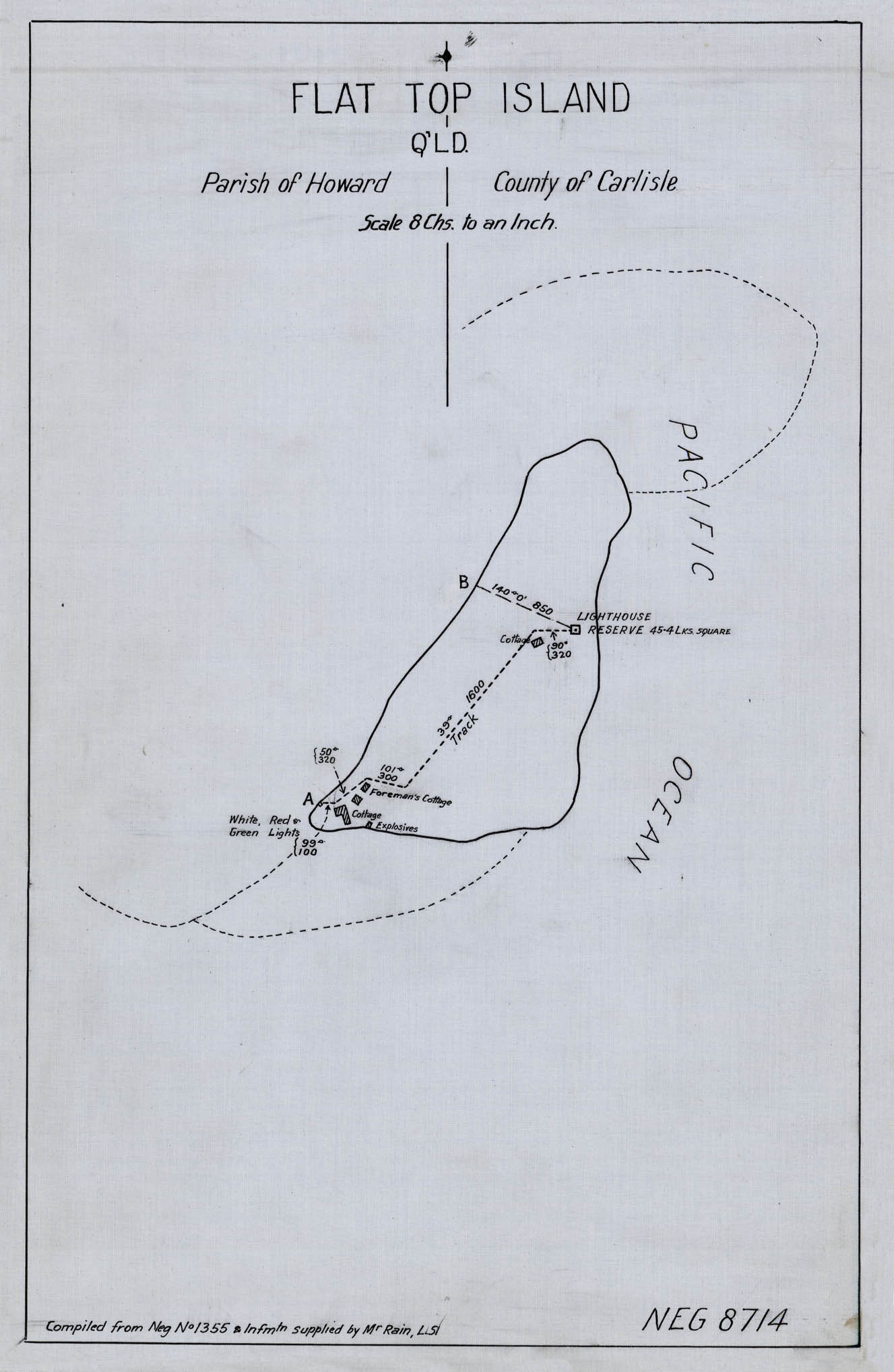
Plan of Flat Top Island, showing the location of the lighthous

Flat Top Island Light is an inactive lighthouse on Flat Top Island, a small island off the entrance to Mackay harbor at the mouth of Pioneer River, about 6.5 kilometres (4.0 mi) east of Mackay, Queensland, Australia. It used to mark the river entrance for shipping and the direction of the port, as well as highlighting close by shoals at Shoalwater Point and a reef off Hay Point. At 6 metres (20 ft) from the ground to the lantern floor, it is the shortest of Queensland's timber-framed iron clad lighthouses.

== History ==
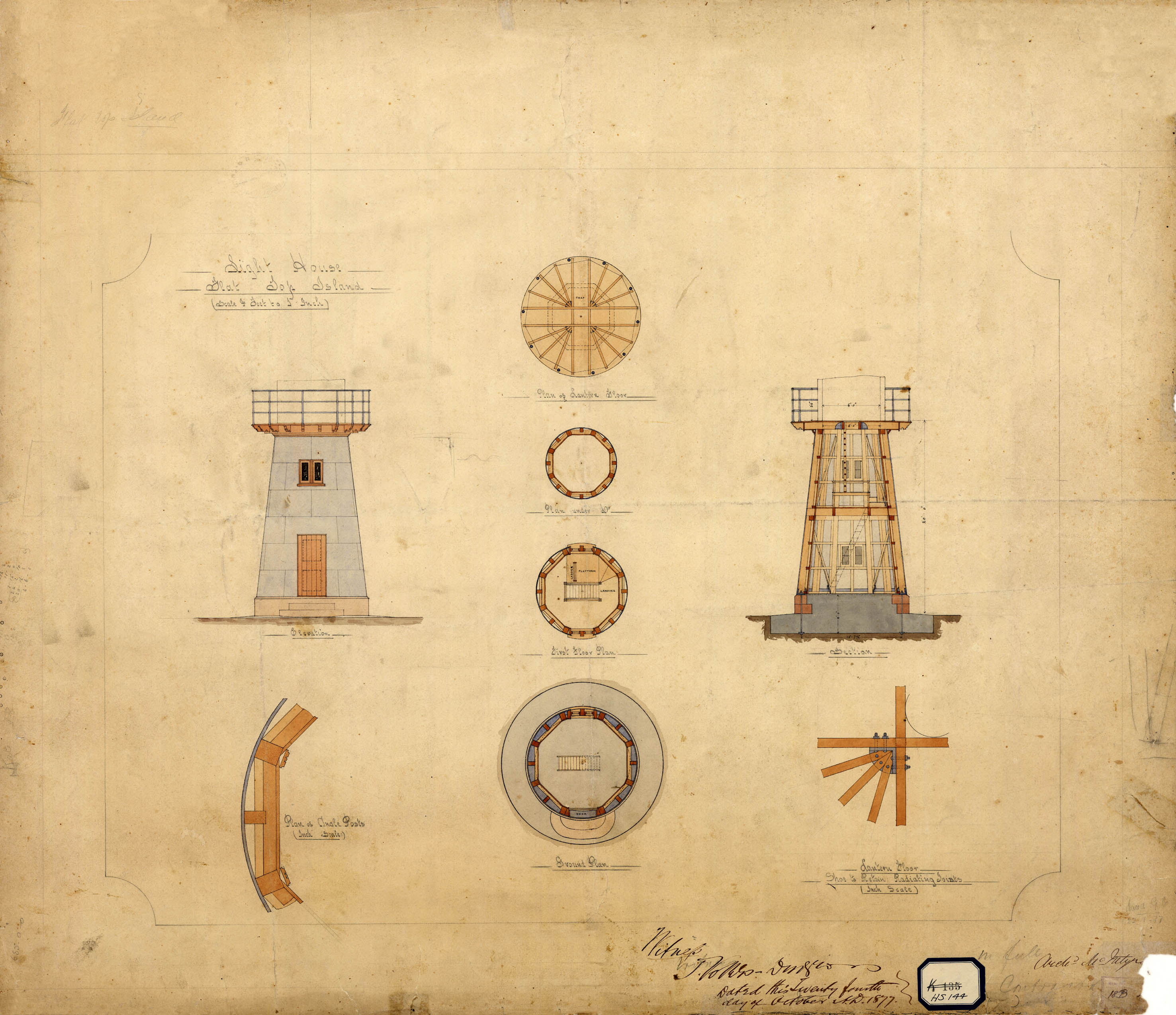
Plan of the lighthouse, 1877

Tenders for the construction of the lighthouse were called in February 1877, and the tender accepted on September of that year was by Archibald McIntyre. Construction commenced in December 1877 and complete in May 1878. However, the lighthouse was not officially lit, as the permanent apparatus was not available and a temporary one was used. The light was officially lit only on 27 December 1879 with the installation of the permanent apparatus. As typical for lighthouses of that period in Queensland, the tower is conical in shape, built of an internal timber frame, clad with galvanized iron plates. The foundation was 4 feet (1.2 m) deep and 17 feet (5.2 m) wide, made of stone and concrete. The lighthouse diameter is 11 feet 3 inches (3.43 m) at the bottom and 7 feet (2.1 m) at the top. The height of the tower is 20 feet (6 m) from the ground to the balcony, making it the shortest of the composite lighthouses ever built in Queensland. From the ground to the top the height reported on construction was 31 feet (9.4 m), with the light being shown at 23 feet (7 m). However, the height was no hindrance, as the focal height was 174 feet (53 m). The permanent light installed was a fixed fourth order dioptric and was visible for 19 nautical miles (35 km; 22 mi). It showed white light for directions clear of danger (except where obscured by the close by Round Top Island) and red over danger. An additional red sector was later installed to show further dangerous locations. The lighthouse is currently painted white with a red dome.

In January 1918 the lighthouse was the only structure on the island and the only aid to navigation to survive the 1918 Mackay cyclone. The lighthouse was automated around 1920. In 1991, the light source was still an open flame acetylene gas burner.

The light was discontinued in March 2007 and it is currently conserved on site. The last light characteristic displayed was four flashes every twenty seconds, red and white depending on the direction (Fl.(4)W.R. 20s).

== Site operation and visiting ==
The lighthouse is currently inactive. Before that, it was operated by the Australian Maritime Safety Authority. The island is accessible only by boat. It is unclear whether public access to the site and tower are available.

== See also ==
- List of lighthouses in Australia
