= Citadel Island =

Island in Australia

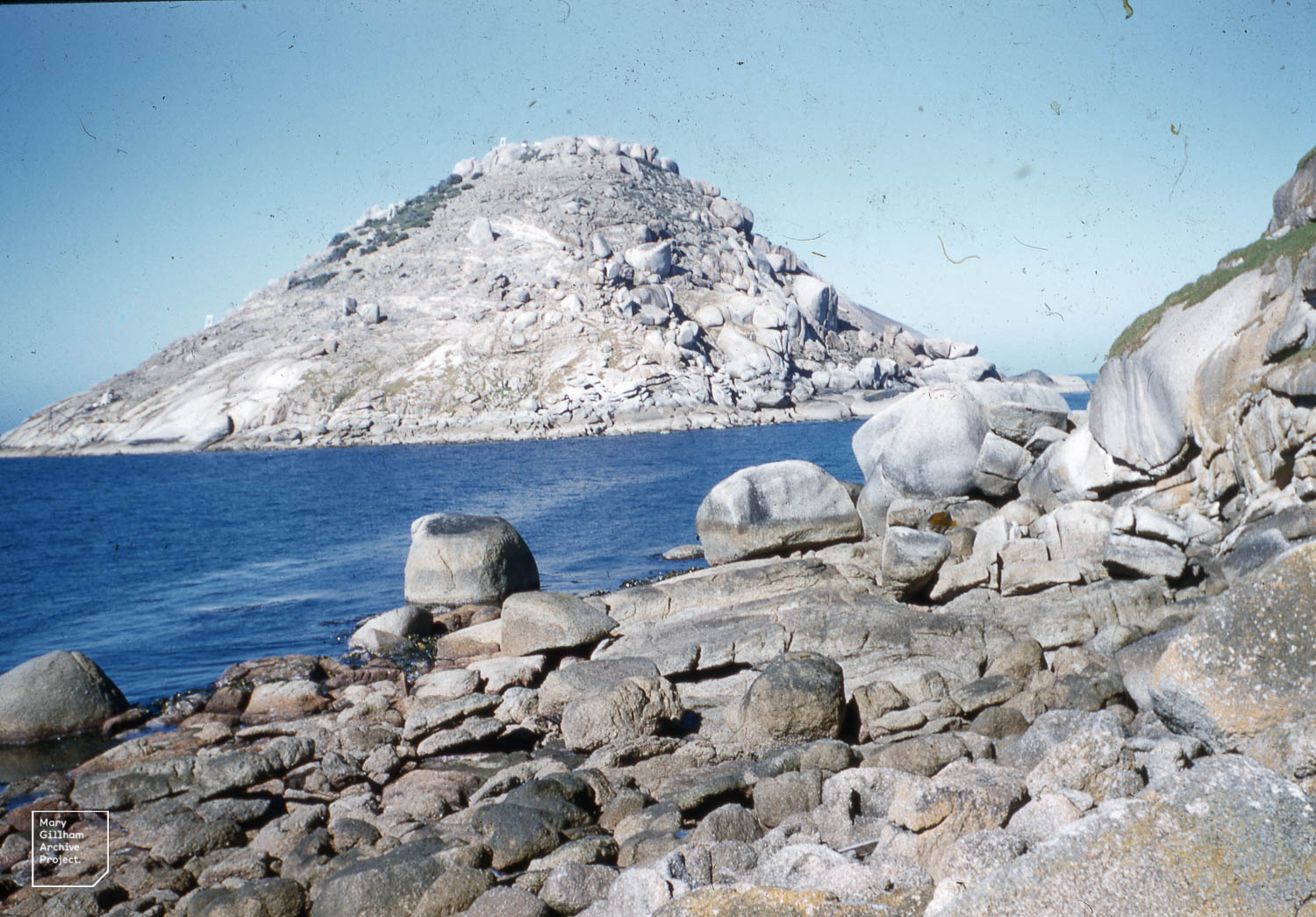
- Citadel Island, Glennies, South Victoria, off Wilsons Promontory

- Location within South Gippsland Shire

Geography
- Location: Bass Strait
- Coordinates: 39°06′53″S 146°14′17″E
- Area: 18 ha (44 acres)
- Length: 675 m (2215 ft)
- Width: 415 m (1362 ft)
- Highest elevation: 110 m (360 ft)

Administration
- Australia
- State: Victoria

Citadel Island is a small, rugged, granite island in the Glennie group of islands off the west coast of Wilsons Promontory, Victoria, Australia. It is the site of the first automatic acetylene powered lighthouse installed by Australia's Commonwealth Lighthouse Service. There is no public access. The island is part of the Wilsons Promontory Islands Important Bird Area, identified as such by BirdLife International because of its importance for breeding seabirds.
