= Deal Island Lighthouse =

Lighthouse in Tasmania, Australia

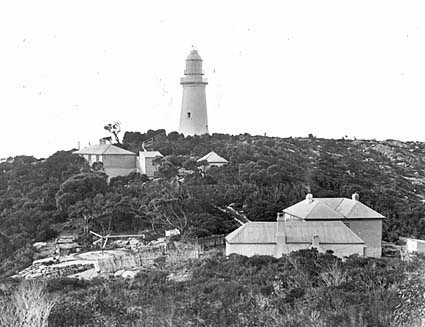
- Location: Deal Island; Tasmania; Australia
- Coordinates: 39°29′39.5″S 147°19′21.1″E

Tower
- Constructed: 1848
- Construction: granite tower
- Automated: 1921
- Height: 22 metres (72 ft)
- Shape: cylindrical tower with balcony and lantern
- Markings: white tower and lantern
- Operator: Tasmania Parks and Wildlife Service

Light
- Deactivated: 1992
- Focal height: 305 metres (1,001 ft)
- Lens: 1st order Fresnel lens
- Range: 24 nautical miles (44 km; 28 mi)
- Characteristic: Fl (3) W 20s.

The Deal Island Lighthouse is an inactive lighthouse located on Deal Island which makes part of the Kent Group National Park, Tasmania, Australia.

== History ==
Deal Island has the highest lighthouse in the Southern Hemisphere, standing 305 metres (1,001 ft) above sea level and was sometimes visible at night from Wilson's Promontory, 80 kilometres (50 mi) away. The lighthouse was built in 1848 and deactivated in 1992. While active, the height caused problems with visibility in low cloud conditions.

Management and conservation is under the control of the Tasmania Parks and Wildlife Service. On 26 April 1943, during World War II, a Royal Australian Air Force A25 Airspeed Oxford aircraft crashed, killing all four crewmen. The aircraft wreck and their graves are about 15 metres (49 ft) apart at the bottom of the cliff. The bodies have since been disinterred and buried at Springvale, Victoria. Eyewitness accounts say the plane flew low over a ship which was actually a wreck, and then failed to regain enough height before hitting the cliff.

== See also ==
- List of lighthouses in Australia
