= Cape Hotham Light =

Lighthouse in Northern Territory, Australia

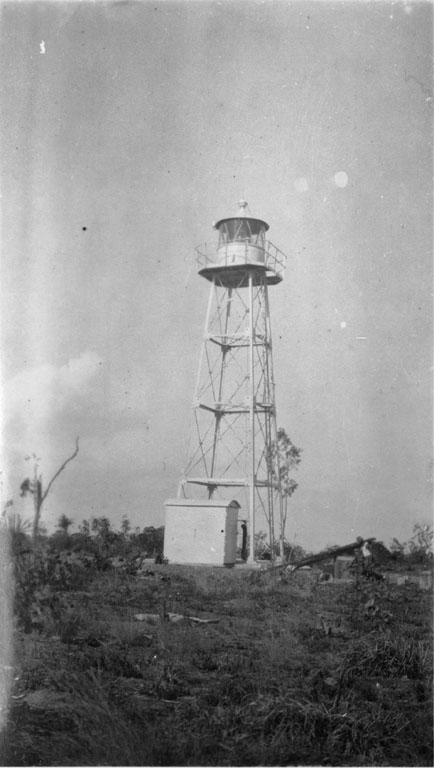
- Cape Hotham, 1928
- Location: Clarence Strait; Northern Territory; Australia
- Coordinates: 12°2′47″S 131°17′22.22″E

Tower
- Constructed: 1910s
- Foundation: concrete
- Construction: metal skeletal tower
- Automated: 1928
- Height: 54 feet (16 m)
- Shape: square pyramidal tower with balcony and lantern
- Markings: white tower and lantern
- Operator: Australian Maritime Safety Authority

Light
- First lit: 9 November 1928
- Focal height: 56 feet (17 m)
- Lens: Chance 400 mm fixed catadioptric
- Range: white: 12 nmi (22 km; 14 mi) red: 9 nmi (17 km; 10 mi)
- Characteristic: Fl (3) WR 15s.

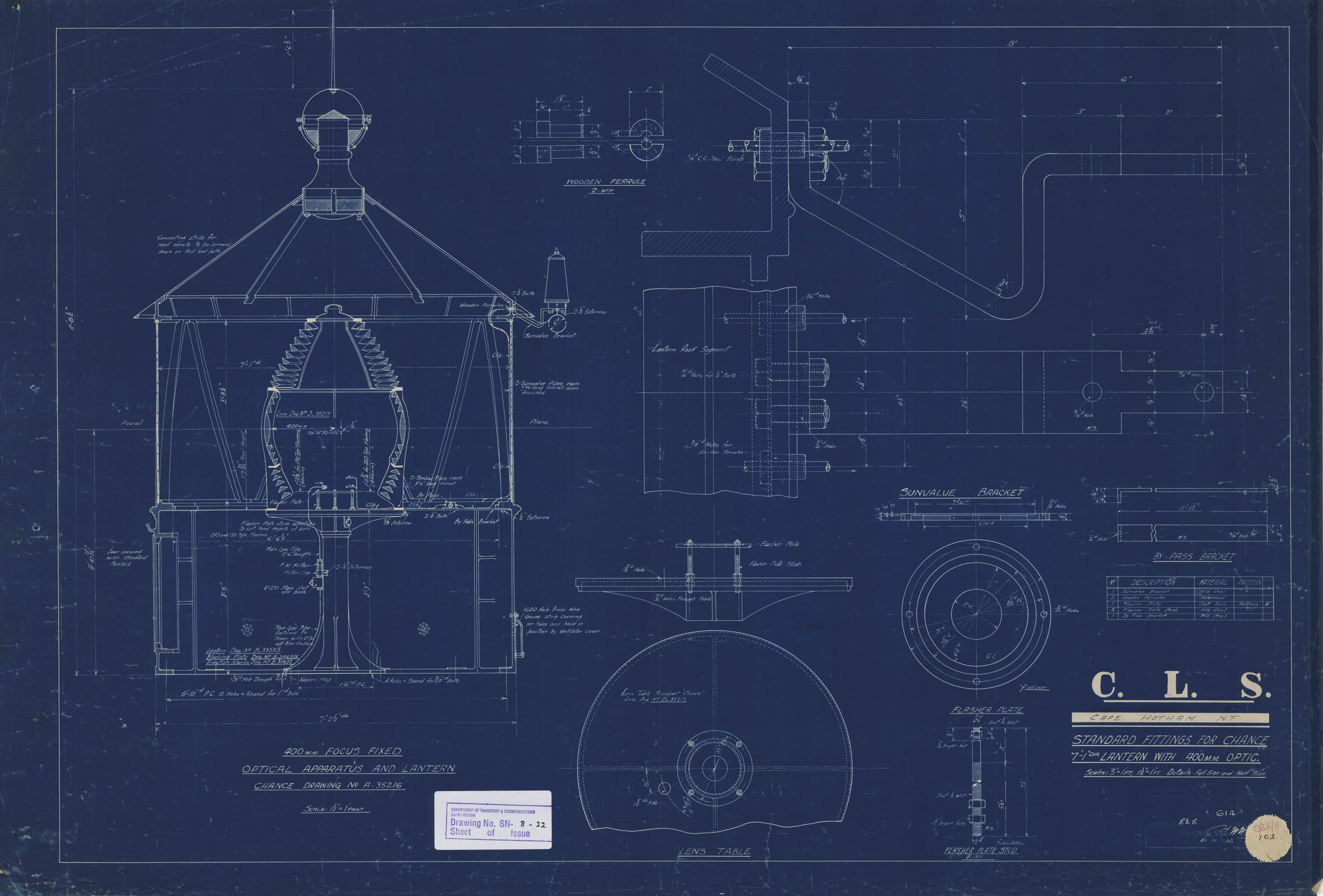
Plans for the optical apparatus installed in Cape Hotham Light, 1926

Cape Hotham Light is an active lighthouse in the Northern Territory of Australia located on Cape Hotham on the coastline of the Van Diemen Gulf about 80 kilometres (50 mi) northeast of the territory capital of Darwin, The lighthouse marks the entrance to Clarence Strait, the eastern approach to Darwin.

The lighthouse was constructed by the Commonwealth Lighthouse Service during the "Golden Age of Australian Lighthouses", between 1913 and 1920.

The light characteristic shown is three flashes, one every two seconds, repeating every 15 seconds (Fl.(3)W.R. 15s). The colour is red on 025°-070° and white elsewhere. The red light is visible for 9 nautical miles (17 km; 10 mi) while the white light is visible for 12 nautical miles (22 km; 14 mi).

The site is accessible by boat from Darwin, but the tower is closed to the public. The light is operated by the Australian Maritime Safety Authority.

== Cape Hotham ==
Cape Hotham was named by John Clements Wickham on 26 July 1839, honoring Admiral William Hotham, 1st Baron Hotham. It is listed in the Register of the National Estate as the "Cape Hotham Forest Reserve", listing "representative ecosystems of the Top End, including monsoon rainforest containing kentia palm (Gronophyllum ramsayi)".

== See also ==
- List of lighthouses in Australia
