= Wharton Reef Light =

Lighthouse in Queensland, Australia

Wharton Reef Light – Original light
- Location: Townsville, Queensland, Australia
- Coordinates: 19°16′S 146°49′E

Tower
- Constructed: 1915
- Construction: metal skeletal tower
- Height: 30 m (98 ft)
- Shape: square tower with balcony and lantern
- Markings: Red
- Power source: acetylene
- Operator: Commonwealth Lighthouse Service

Light
- Deactivated: 1990
- Focal height: 56 m (184 ft)
- Intensity: 1,500 candela
- Range: 13 nmi (24 km; 15 mi)
- Characteristic: Fl W 3s
- Current light
- Constructed: 1990
- Construction: stainless steel (tower), concrete (deep foundation), fiberglass (hut)
- Height: 6 m (20 ft)
- Power source: solar power
- Operator: Australian Maritime Safety Authority
- First lit: 26 March 1990
- Focal height: 14 m (46 ft)
- Intensity: 2,100 candela (white), 420 candela (red), 420 candela (green)
- Range: 10 nmi (19 km; 12 mi) (white), 7 nmi (13 km; 8.1 mi) (red), 7 nmi (13 km; 8.1 mi) (green)
- Characteristic: Fl WRG 5s

Wharton Reef Light is an inactive lighthouse which used to be located on Wharton Reef in Princess Charlotte Bay off the Cape York Peninsula, Queensland, Australia. When it was deactivated in 1990 it was donated to the Townsville Maritime Museum and it is now on display near the museum. It is the only survivor of a series of twenty automatic lighthouses installed in Queensland during the "Golden Age of Australian Lighthouses" from 1913 to the early 1920s.

== History ==
With the Federation of Australia in 1901, responsibility over coastal lighthouses was to be transferred to the commonwealth. In 1911, the Lighthouses Act was passed, giving the Commonwealth the power to take responsibility over navigational aids as required. The actual transfer of responsibility took place with the formation of the Commonwealth Lighthouse Service (CLS) on 1 July 1915, during a period that was termed "the Golden Age of Australian lighthouses", from 1913 to the early 1920s. The CLS took over a group of 104 staffed and 18 unstaffed lighthouses. Lighting the northern Inside Passage, the shipping route inside the Great Barrier Reef, was one of the urgent tasks taken by the CLS. At the time, only four lights were present between the Torres Strait and Cooktown, namely Grassy Hill Light, Pipon Island Light, Goods Island Light and Booby Island Light. The CLS tackled this task with the installation of twenty new fully automatic unattended lights, a decision motivated by the shortage of manpower, materials and funding caused by World War I.

The structures were almost identical, differing mainly in height. The structures were mostly installed on coral reefs or sandbars, with little natural support. The foundation was usually a flat concrete base with concrete piers supporting the structure. The structure was a simple four-legged steel frame, manufactured in Brisbane, topped with simple lantern with a small balcony. The apparatus was a fully automatic Dalén light consisting of a carbide lamp feeding on compressed acetylene gas, controlled by a sun valve.

Wharton Reef Light, established 1915, was one of the first such lights to be constructed. The lighthouse was located on Wharton Reef (then called Dhu Reef) in Princess Charlotte Bay, west of Pipon Island, about 350 kilometres (220 mi) north of Cairns, replacing an earlier beacon on the reef. It was originally about 50 feet (15 m) high. The construction of Wharton Reef Light was especially difficult due to bad weather. Instability of the surface required deep excavation of the foundations.

Wharton Reef Light was described in 1959 as showing a white flash every three seconds. The light had an intensity of 1,500 cd and was visible for 13 nautical miles (24 km; 15 mi). The light was displayed at an elevation of 56 feet (17 m).

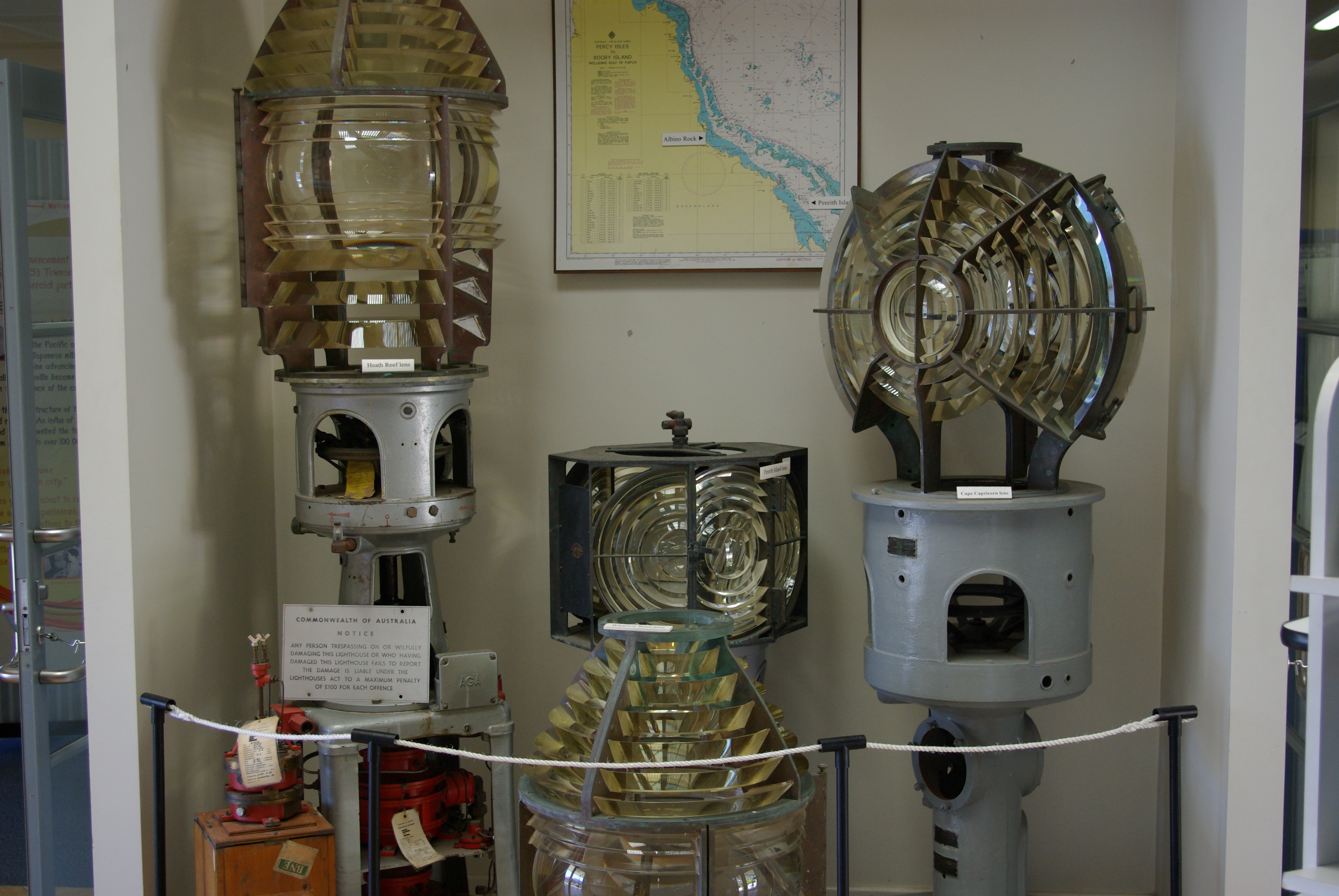
Fresnel lens from Wharton Reef Light on the bottom row, at Townsville Maritime Museum

The lighthouse operated until 1990, when the structure was replaced by a fibreglass hut and the light was replaced by an automatic ML-300 beacon. By then it was the last of its kind to remain operative. The tower was donated by the federal Department of Transport to the Townsville Maritime Museum. It was dismantled and shipped to Townsville. In 1996 it was erected in the middle of a traffic turnabout near the museum, where it stands on display as of 2011. The Fresnel lens from the light is on display inside the museum, along with other lenses used in the area. It is now the only survivor of the series of twenty lighthouses.

== Current light ==
The current structure, installed on 26 March 1990, is a white fibre glass hut, mounted on a small stainless steel structure, on concrete piles. It is 6 metres (20 ft) tall, from seabed to the deck, and the light is displayed at 14 metres (46 ft), with a daymark at 12 metres (39 ft). The current light characteristic is a flash every five seconds, white, red or green, depending on direction (Fl.W.R.G. 5s). Green is displayed at 84°-97°, visible for 7 nautical miles (13 km; 8.1 mi), white is displayed at 97°-126° and 229°-84°, visible for 10 nautical miles (19 km; 12 mi), and red is displayed at 126°-229°, visible for 7 nautical miles (13 km; 8.1 mi). The light source is a solar powered ML-300 beacon with a 12 Volt 35 Watt Halogen lamp, showing an intensity of 2,100 cd for the white light and 420 cd for the red and green ones. It is operated by the Australian Maritime Safety Authority.

== Site operation and visiting ==
The original tower is owned by the Townsville Maritime Museum. Both the site and lighthouse are managed by the Townsville City Council. Although the site is easily accessible, the tower itself is closed to the public.

== See also ==
- List of lighthouses in Australia
