= Creal Reef Light =

Lighthouse in Queensland, Australia

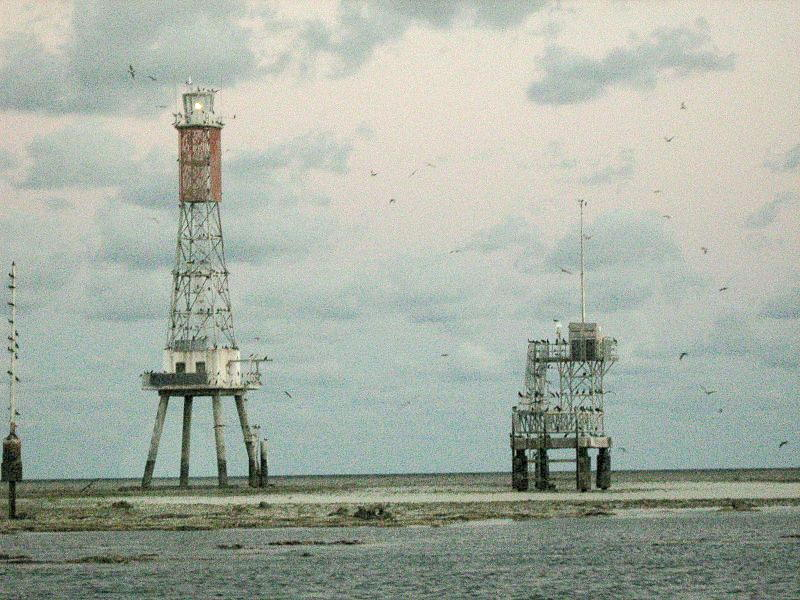
- The light is the tower on the left
- Location: Mackay; Queensland; Australia
- Coordinates: 20°32′02.3″S 150°22′49.84″E

Tower
- Constructed: 1985
- Foundation: reinforced concrete on four piles
- Construction: stainless steel skeletal tower
- Height: 34.5 metres (113 ft)
- Shape: square pyramidal tower with balcony and lantern
- Markings: white tower with an orange square daymark in the upper half
- Power source: solar power
- Operator: Australian Maritime Safety Authority
- Racon: M

Light
- Focal height: 32 metres (105 ft)
- Lens: VRB-25
- Intensity: 104,000 cd
- Characteristic: Fl W 7.5s

Creal Reef Light is an active lighthouse located at Creal Reef, a planar reef about 150 kilometres (93 mi) east of Mackay, Queensland, Australia. It guides ships outgoing from Mackay into Hydrographers Passage, a deep water channel east of Mackay. The structure is a stainless steel tower, which also serves as a daymark and carries a racon.

== Creal Reef ==
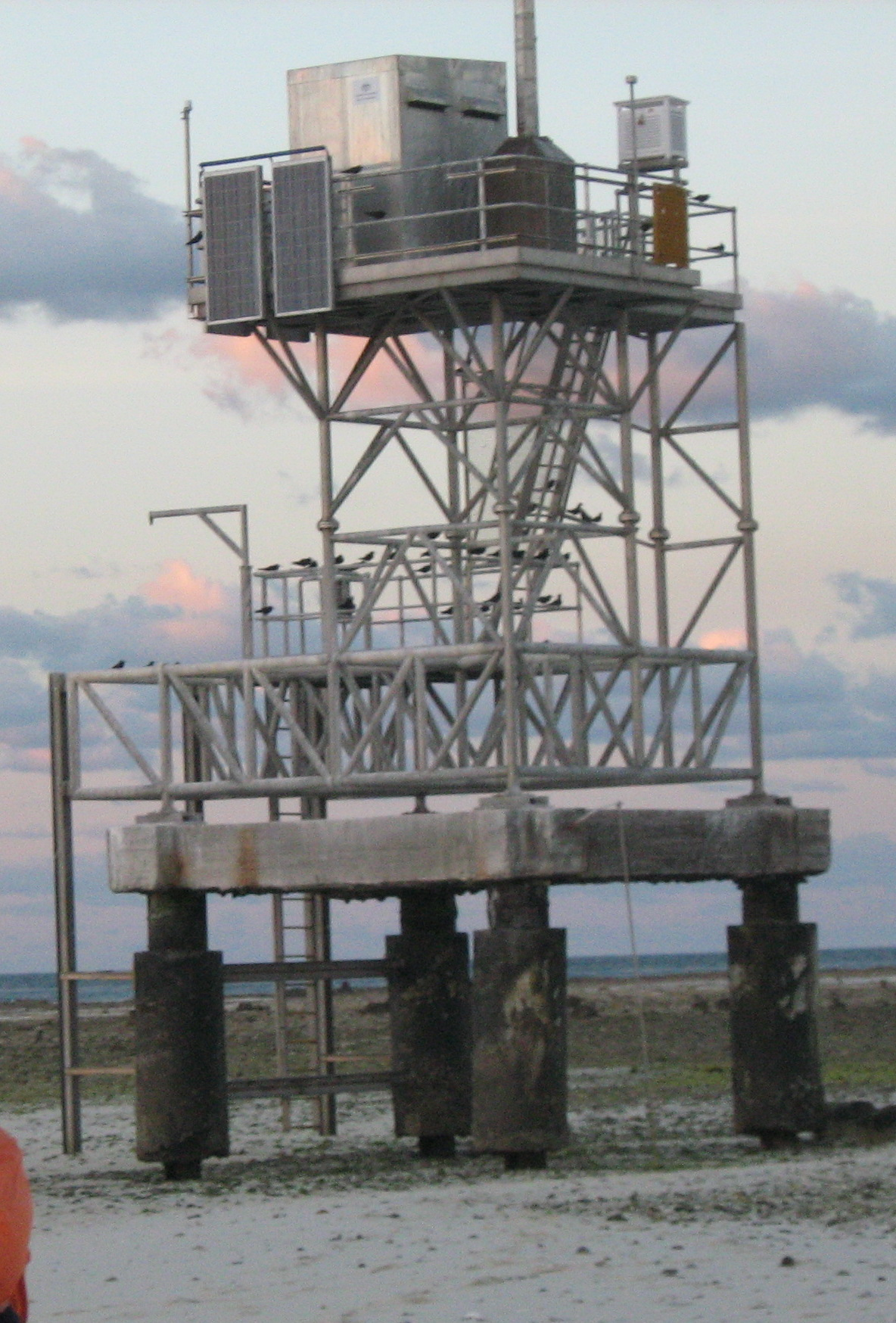
the weather station on Creal Reef

Creal Reef is a middle shelf planar reef with an area of 1.6 square kilometres (0.62 sq mi). It was named in the late 1920s by Captain John A. Edgell (RN) on the survey ship HMAS Moresby, during the Moresby survey of the Cumberland Channel inside the Great Barrier Reef. It was named after Denis A. J. Creal, a pilot with the No. 101 Flight RAAF who assisted the Moresby with her surveys.

== Structure and display ==
The structure, established in April 1985, is a 21 metres (69 ft) stainless steel skeletal tower with a white lantern, standing on a reinforced concrete hut, supported on four piles. The total height from the ground to the top platform is 34.5 metres (113 ft). The light shares the location with an automatic weather station.

The current light characteristic is a white flash every 7.5 seconds (Fl.W. 7.5s) visible for a distance of 19 nautical miles (35 km; 22 mi). The apparatus is a solar powered VRB-25 rotating at 1.33 rpm. The light source is a 12 Volt 75 Watt Halogen lamp with an intensity of 104,000 cd. The racon, mounted at an elevation of 34 metres (112 ft), transmits a morse code "M" (- -) for a distance of 16 nautical miles (30 km; 18 mi).

The daymark, displayed at 33 metres (108 ft) above MHWS, comprises two orange 3 by 7 metres (9.8 ft × 23.0 ft) slats on the northern and western faces.

== Site operation and visiting ==
The site and the tower are operated by the Australian Maritime Safety Authority. The island is accessible only by boat, and both the site and the tower are closed to the public.

== See also ==
- List of lighthouses in Australia
