= East Vernon Light =

Lighthouse in Northern Territory, Australia

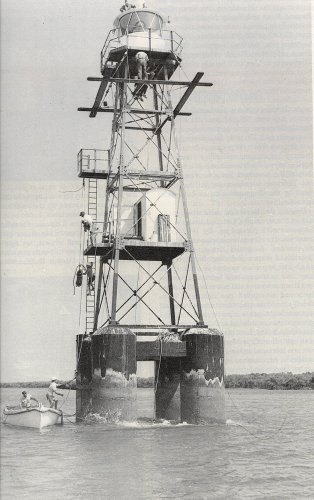
- Historical view of the original lighthouse
- Location: Clarence Strait; Northern Territory; Australia
- Coordinates: 12°4′37.99″S 131°5′43.12″E

Tower
- Constructed: 1910s (first)
- Foundation: four concrete piles and platform
- Construction: metal skeletal tower (first) fiberglass tower (current)
- Height: 36 feet (11 m)
- Shape: square pyramidal skeletal tower with balcony and lantern (first) cylindrical tower and no lantern (current)
- Markings: red

Light
- First lit: n/a (current)
- Focal height: 39 feet (12 m)
- Range: white: 11 nmi (20 km; 13 mi) red: 9 nmi (17 km; 10 mi) green: 9 nmi (17 km; 10 mi)
- Characteristic: Fl WRG 5s.

East Vernon Light is an active lighthouse in the Northern Territory of Australia located in the Clarence Strait on the southern coast of East Vernon Island. The lighthouse guards the northeastern approach to Darwin.

== History ==
The original lighthouse was constructed by the Commonwealth Lighthouse Service during the "Golden Age of Australian Lighthouses", between 1913 and 1920. It was a square skeletal tower with a lantern and a gallery, about 70 feet (21 m) high. The current red lighthouse was built on the same piles.

The light characteristic shown is a flash every five seconds, with a different colour depending on the direction: white on 250°-042° and -094°, red on -088° and green on -105°. The light is obscured elsewhere (Fl.W.R.G. 5s). The red and green lights are visible for 8 nautical miles (15 km; 9.2 mi) while the white light is visible for 11 nautical miles (20 km; 13 mi).

The site is accessible by boat and the tower is closed to the public. The light is operated by the Australian Maritime Safety Authority.

== See also ==
- List of lighthouses in Australia
