= Breaksea Island Lighthouse =

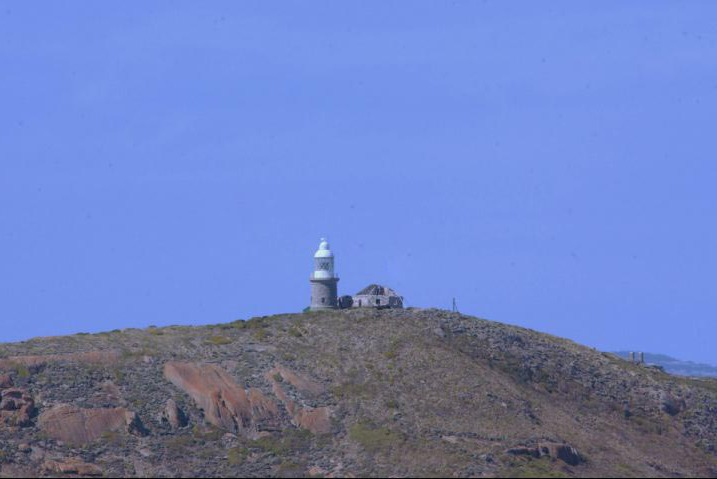
- Breaksea Island Lighthouse
- Location: Breaksea Island, Western Australia, Australia
- Coordinates: 35°03′48″S 118°03′16″E

Tower
- Constructed: 1858
- Construction: stone (tower)
- Height: 16 m (52 ft)
- Shape: cylinder (tower)
- Markings: Unpainted (tower), white (lantern)
- Power source: solar power
- Operator: Australian Maritime Safety Authority
- Heritage: State Registered Place

Light
- First lit: 1901
- Focal height: 119 m (390 ft)
- Range: 13 nmi (24 km; 15 mi)
- Characteristic: Fl(2) W 6s

Western Australia Heritage Register
- Type: State Registered Place
- Designated: 22 January 2002
- Reference no.: 3353

Breaksea Island Lighthouse is an active lighthouse located at Breaksea Island in King George Sound 12 kilometres (7.5 mi) from Albany.

The first lighthouse was built in 1858 by English convicts using pre-made cast iron sheeting rising it at the centre of an octagonal stone keeper's cottage; in 1889 two keeper's cottages were built. This lighthouse was replaced in 1901 by a cylindrical granite tower built on the rear still active and in good condition.

A major refurbishment taking 21 weeks was undertaken in early 2020, under a contract from the Australian Maritime Safety Authority (AMSA).

== Keepers ==
William Hill (1812–1864) was an Enrolled Pensioner Guard living in Albany. He was the lighthouse keeper from August 1860 until 23 March 1864 when he had a mental breakdown and is believed to have jumped into the sea.

Robert Wilkinson Howe (1862 – 1943) became the keeper in 1906 having previously been stationed at Cape Leeuwin. His wife Hannah and daughter Faye lived with him on the island and his wife died in 1914. His daughter then looked after her father and she left the island in 1916.

== See also ==
- List of lighthouses in Australia
