= Eborac Island Light =

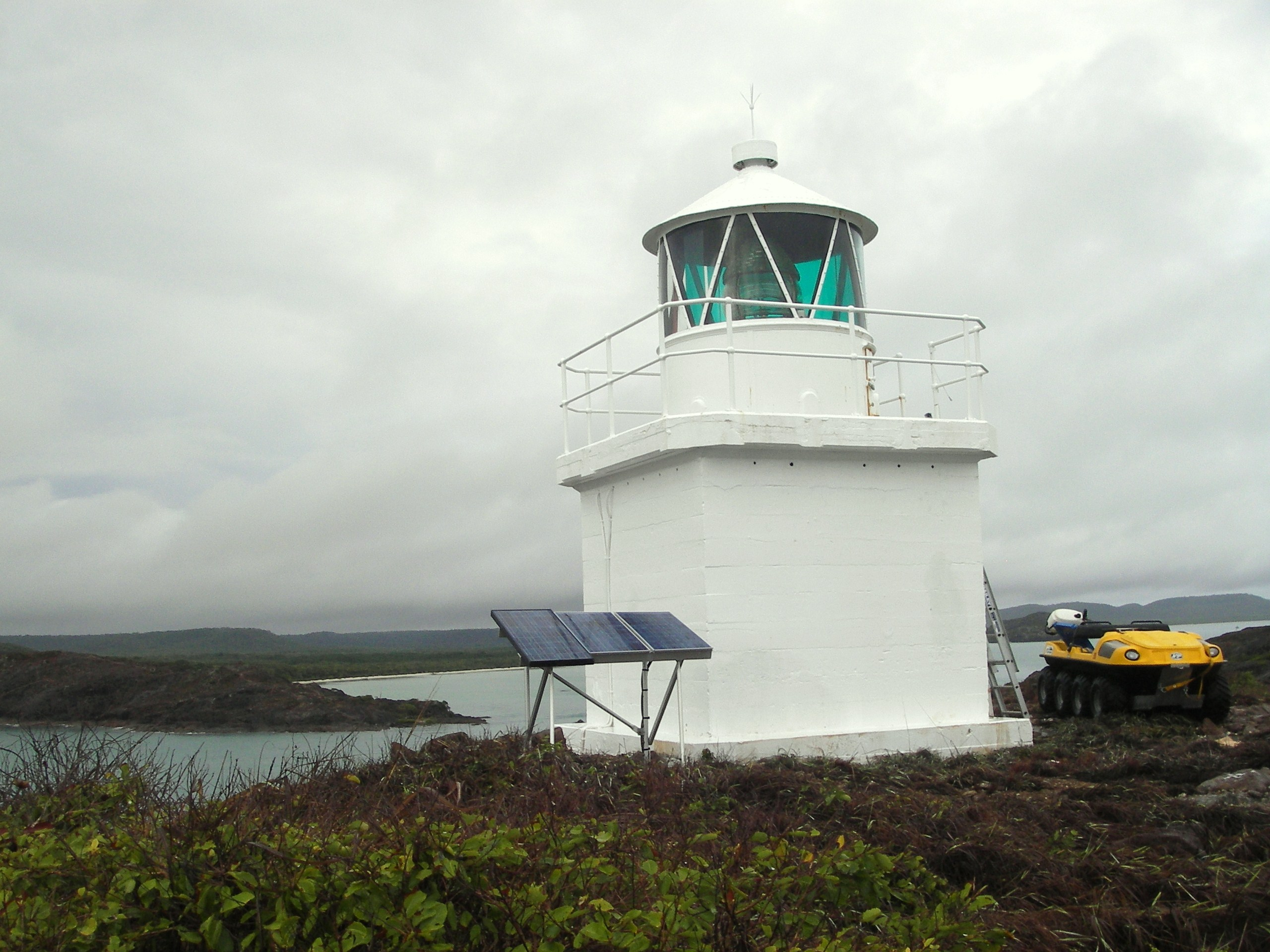
- Eborac Island Light, 2007
- Location: Eborac Island; Queensland; Australia
- Coordinates: 10°40′55.62″S 142°32′01.07″E

Tower
- Constructed: 1921
- Foundation: concrete
- Construction: fiberglass
- Automated: 1990
- Shape: hexagonal
- Markings: white tower and lantern
- Power source: solar power
- Operator: Australian Maritime Safety Authority

Light
- First lit: 1921
- Focal height: 115 feet (35 m)
- Lens: third and one-half order Fresnel lens
- Range: 16 nmi (30 km)
- Characteristic: Fl (2) W 10s.

Eborac Island Light is an active lighthouse on Eborac Island, a small rocky island in the Adolphus Channel just off Cape York, the northern tip of Cape York Peninsula, Far North Queensland, Australia. It guides ships into the coastal channel inside the Great Barrier Reef. A concrete structure was built in 1921 and converted to solar power in 1990. It was replaced with a fiberglass structure in 2012.

== Eborac Island ==
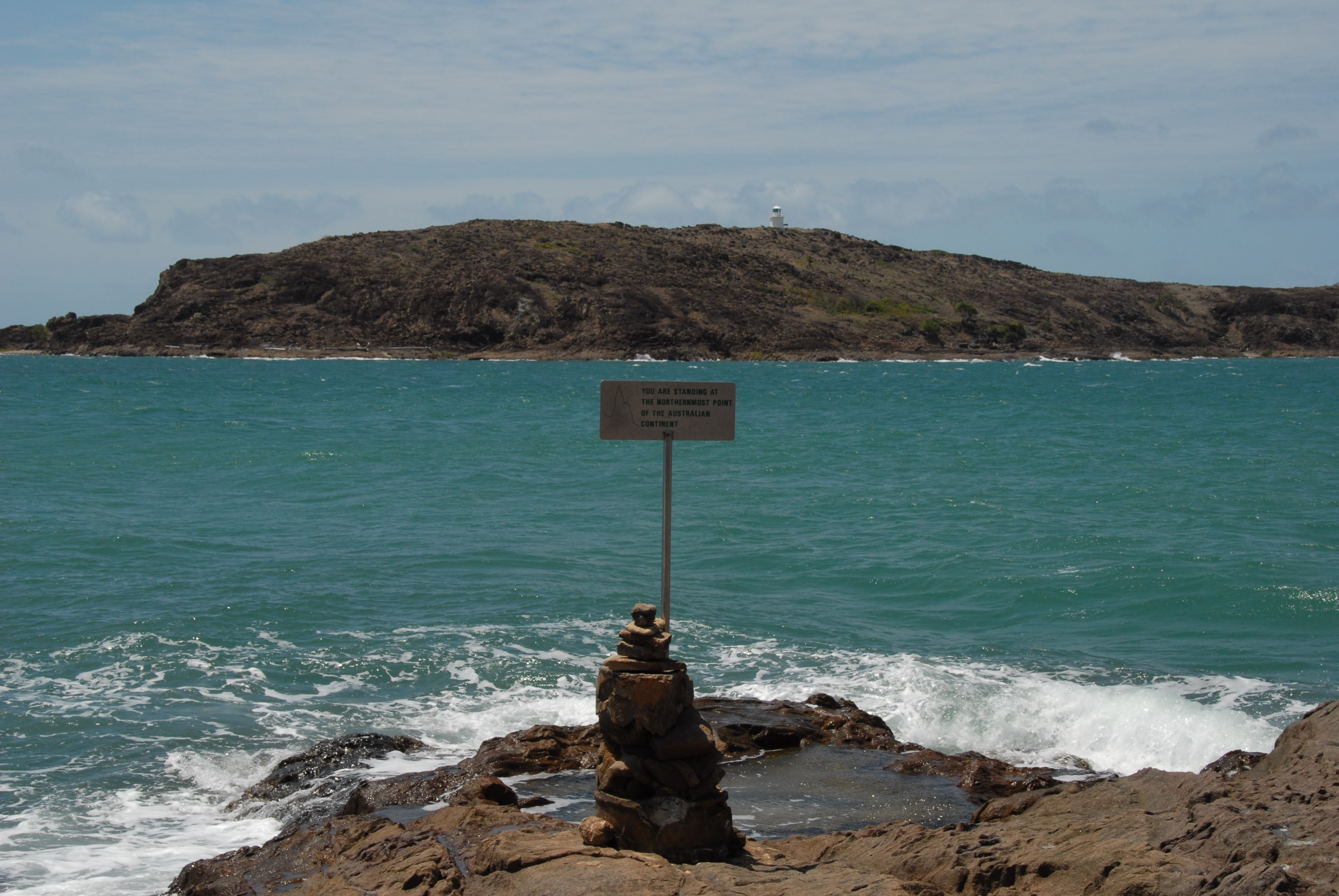
View of Eborac Island from Cape York

Eborac Island is located in the Adolphus Channel, a channel at the northeastern end of Cape York Peninsula and southeastern portion of the Torres Strait. The island is one of the Torres Strait Islands. It is visible just across from Cape York, the northernmost point on the Australian continent. Its native name is Dyāra.

== Structure and display ==
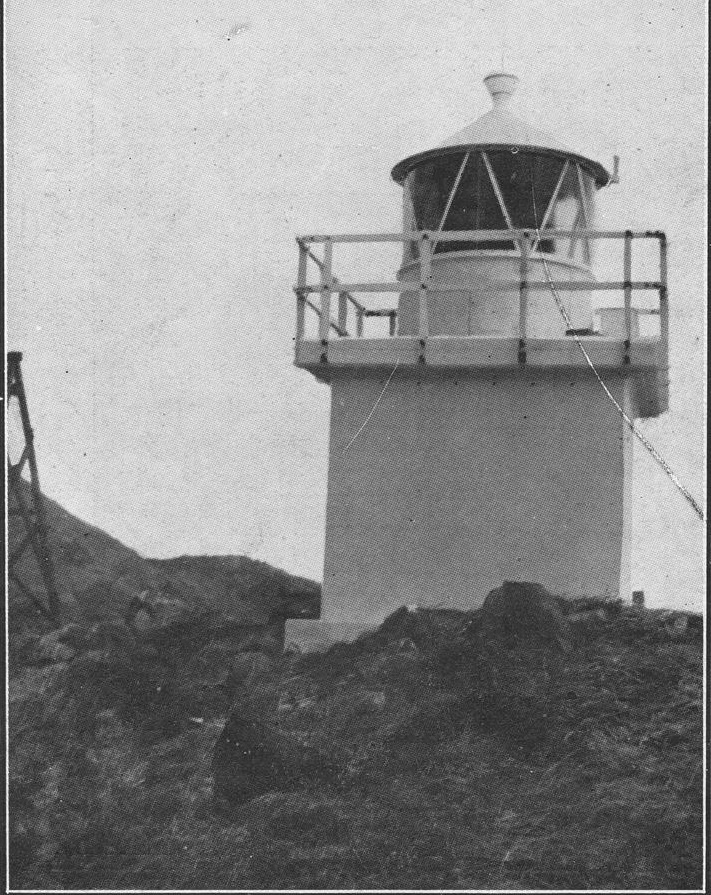
Eborac Island Light, 1931

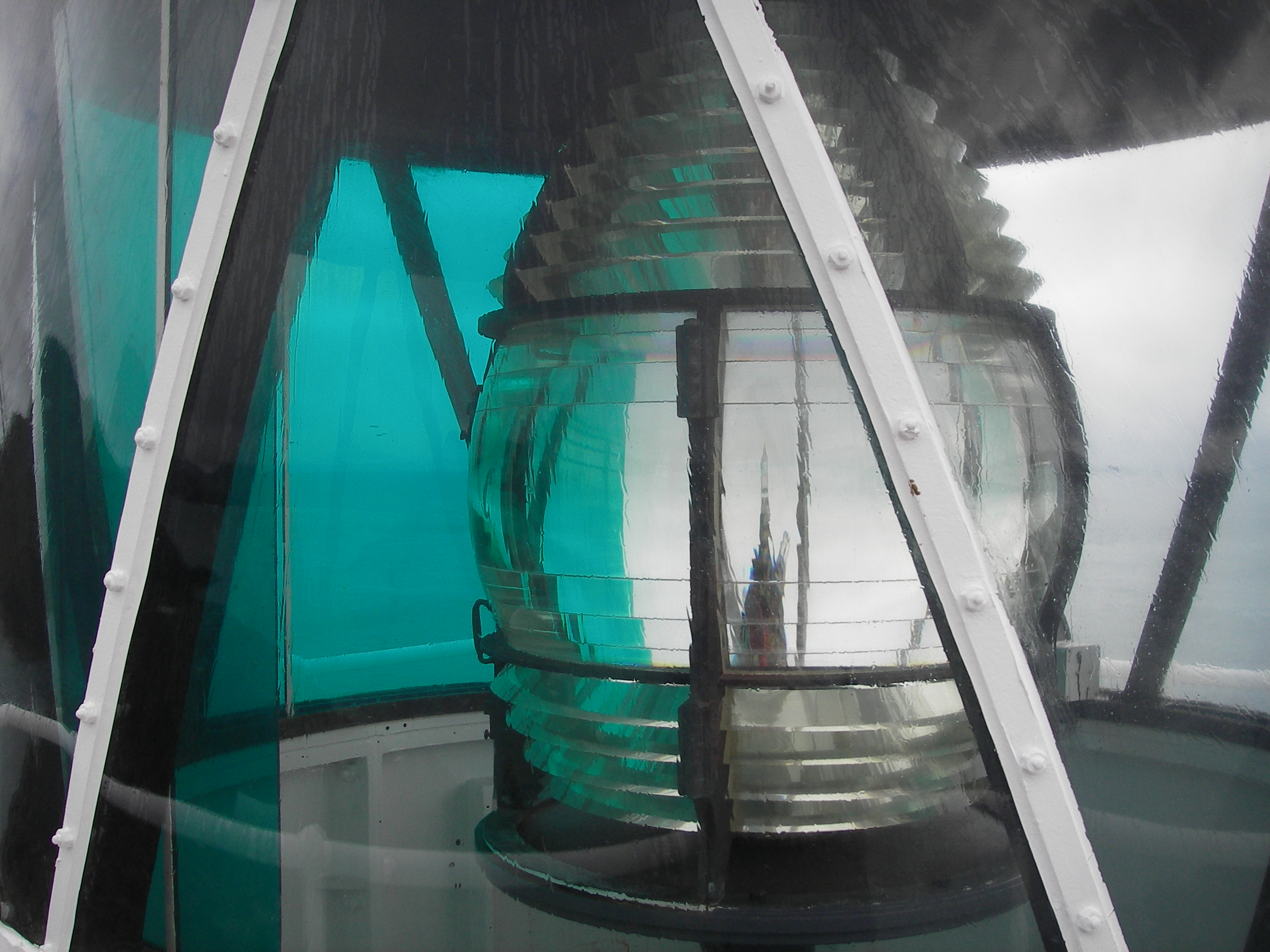
The lens at Eborac Island Light, showing a green sector

Eborac Island Light was established in 1921. It was converted to solar power on 8 August 1990. The structure was a square concrete hut, 3 metres (9.8 ft) from the base to the platform, topped by a Chance Brothers 7 feet 11 inches (2.41 m) diameter lantern room. Both were painted white, and the total height was 6 metres (20 ft). A Helipad is nearby. The apparatus was a Chance Brothers 400 mm focal length Fresnel lens. The light source was a solar powered 12 Volt 35 Watt Halogen lamp and the intensity was 3,700 cd for the white light and 700 cd for the red and green ones. The light characteristic was two flashes, separated by two seconds, every 10 seconds, colored white, red or green depending on direction (Fl.(2)W.R.G. 10s). White, visible for 11 nautical miles (20 km; 13 mi), was shown at 267°30′-281°, 288°30′-000° and 135°-252°. Green, visible for 8 nautical miles (15 km; 9.2 mi), was shown at 252°30′-267°30′ and 000°-135°. Red, visible for 8 nautical miles (15 km; 9.2 mi), was shown at the small middle sector, 281°-288°30′.

In 2012, after showing significant cracking and deterioration, the tower was completely demolished down to the concrete base and replaced with a fiberglass hexagonal tower. The current light characteristic is two white flashes, separated by two seconds, every 10 seconds.

== Site operation and visiting ==
The site and the tower are operated by the Australian Maritime Safety Authority. The island is accessible only by boat, and both the site and the tower are closed to the public. The lighthouse is, however, visible from the tip of Cape York, which can be reached by four wheel drive.

== See also ==
- List of lighthouses in Australia
