= Cape Fourcroy =

Point in Australia

Coordinates: 11°48′0.00″S 130°1′0.00″E

Cape Fourcroy is located at the western tip of Bathurst Island. Cyclone Tracy passed through here in December 1974. It is the location of Cape Fourcroy Light, an active lighthouse.

It is believed that the cape was named after Antoine François, comte de Fourcroy, on 26 July 1803 by Louis de Freycinet, on his journey on the Géographe, in Baudin's expedition to Australia.

On 31 December 1942, a 31 Squadron Bristol Beaufighter crashed near the Cape, but both crew members were able to bail out and were rescued.
