= Emery Point Light =

Lighthouse in Northern Territory, Australia

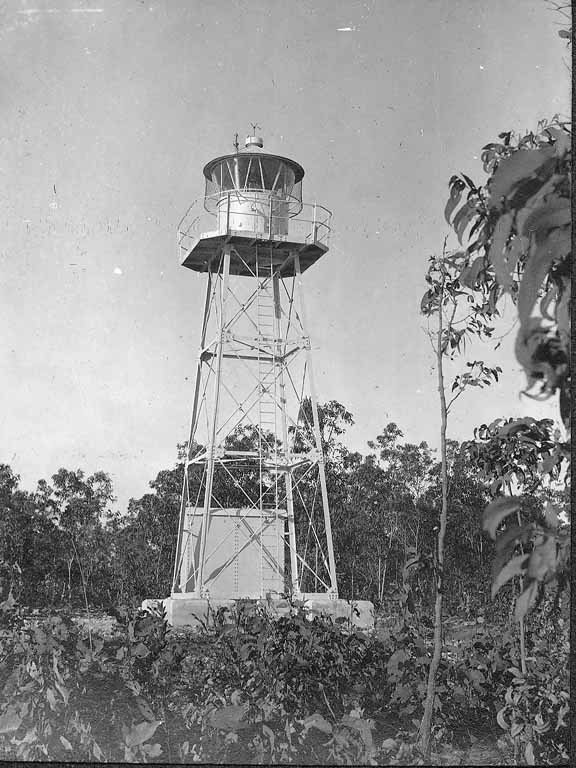
- Emery Point Light, 1915
- Location: Larrakeyah; Northern Territory; Australia
- Coordinates: 12°27′13.5″S 130°48′55.99″E

Tower
- Constructed: 1900
- Foundation: concrete base
- Construction: metal skeletal tower
- Height: 31 feet (9.4 m)
- Shape: square pyramidal tower with balcony and lantern
- Markings: white tower and lantern
- Operator: Larrakeyah Barracks

Light
- First lit: 1915
- Focal height: 60 feet (18 m)
- Range: white: 19 nmi (35 km; 22 mi) red: 14 nmi (26 km; 16 mi)
- Characteristic: Fl(3) WR 15s.

Emery Point Light is an active lighthouse located at Larrakeyah Barracks, the main base for the Australian Defence Force in Northern Territory, Australia, at the entrance to Port Darwin. It was the second lighthouse to be built in Port Darwin. It was the only navigational aid to remain functional in the path of Cyclone Tracy.

== History ==
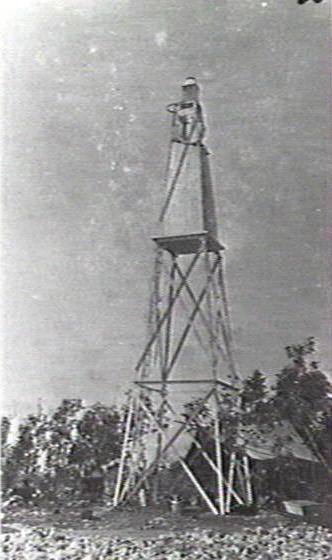
The lighthouse dismantled in 1915

The first light at Emery Point was established in 1900, and dismantled in May 1915, in preparation for the installation of the current lighthouse, which was installed later that year. Its construction was part of the "Golden Age of Australian Lighthouses", taking place between 1913 and 1920.

The original light source was a carbide lamp (acetylene gas lamp). It was converted to electric power on 23 March 1966, with an acetylene gas standby. The current light source is a 1,000 watt tungsten-halogen lamp.

In Christmas Eve of 1974, Cyclone Tracy hit the city of Darwin. Emery Point Light was the only navigational aid to remain functional in the path of the storm.

Over the years, the light characteristic shown was changed. The original characteristic was an occulting light, with an eclipse of 1.5 seconds every six seconds (Oc. 6s). It used to have a range of 17 nautical miles (31 km; 20 mi). The current light characteristic shown is three flashes, one every two seconds, repeating every 15 seconds (Fl.(3)W.R. 15s). The colour is red on -181° and white on 335°-139°. The red light is visible for 14 nautical miles (26 km; 16 mi) while the white light is visible for 19 nautical miles (35 km; 22 mi).

=== Emery Point ===
Emery Point was originally called Goondal. It was named after a Lieutenant Emery, who discovered fresh water at the base of the cliff.

== Structure ==
The current tower, dating from 1915, is a square metal skeletal tower, painted white, topped with a lantern. Its height is 31 feet (9.4 m) from the base to the lantern, and the focal height (height of the light above sea level) is 60 feet (18 m).

== Visiting and operation ==
The site and the tower are inside a military base and are closed to the public, though a sea view is possible. The light is operated by the Darwin Port Corporation.

== See also ==
- List of lighthouses in Australia
