= Caffarelli Island =

Island off the coast of Western Australia

Coordinates: 16°02′26″S 123°17′22″E

Caffarelli Island is located in the Buccaneer Archipelago, off the Kimberley coast of Western Australia. It is the northwestern-most of the islands in the archipelago. Nearby islands include Cleft Island and Bathurst Island.

Caffarelli Island Lighthouse is an unmanned light at the west end of the island. It was established in 1967, and is a 6-metre-tall (20 ft), white round metal tower, that sits on the 68-metre (223 ft) summit of the island.
