= Cape Tourville Lighthouse =

Lighthouse in Tasmania, Australia

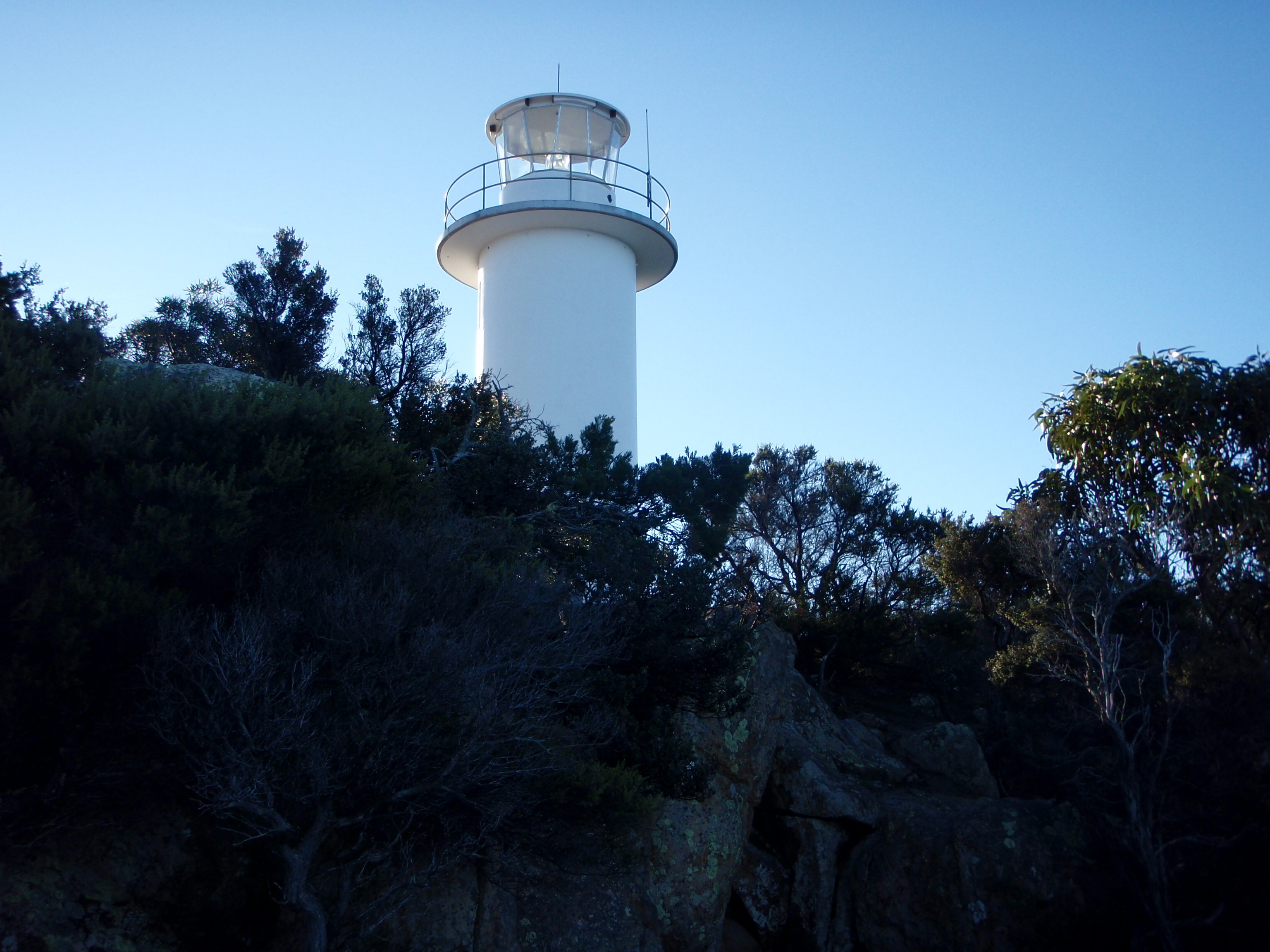
- Location: Freycinet Peninsula; Tasmania; Australia
- Coordinates: 42°07′21.6″S 148°20′34.8″E

Tower
- Constructed: 1971
- Construction: concrete tower
- Height: 11 feet (3.4 m)
- Shape: cylindrical tower with balcony and lantern
- Markings: white tower and lantern
- Operator: Australian Maritime Safety Authority

Light
- Focal height: 126 feet (38 m)
- Intensity: 160,000 cd
- Range: 28 nautical miles (52 km; 32 mi)
- Characteristic: Fl (3) W 10s.

The Cape Tourville Lighthouse is an unmanned, automatic lighthouse built in 1971 by private contractors (Hurburgh and Olbrich). The road was constructed through virgin eucalypt forest, along with the powerline, with minimal disruption to the National Park. The top of the granite headland was levelled by blasting to provide the base for the lighthouse and parking area.

This lighthouse was built at the same time as the new lighthouse at Point Home, near Triabunna, to provide better guidance for the bulk carriers carrying wood chips from the Triabunna wood chip mill.

It replaced the Cape Forestier Lighthouse which had been situated nearby on another headland jutting off the Freycinet Peninsula known as Lemon Rock.

== See also ==
- History of Tasmania
- List of lighthouses in Tasmania
