= Citadel Island Lighthouse =

Lighthouse in Australia

- Location: Bass Strait; 13 km SW of Tidal River, Wilsons Promontory; Australia
- Coordinates: 39°06′54″S 146°14′13″E

Tower
- Constructed: 1913 (first)
- Construction: fiberglass tower (current)
- Height: 2 metres (6.6 ft)

Light
- First lit: 1982 (current)
- Deactivated: 1982 (first)
- Focal height: 117 metres (384 ft)
- Range: 32 kilometres (20 mi)

Citadel Island Lighthouse was built in 1913. In 1982, it was replaced by a GRP cabinet while the light was converted to solar power. The old lantern was dismantled in 1992 and removed to Port Albert, where it was restored for display at the Port Albert Maritime Museum in 2004.

== See also ==
- List of lighthouses in Australia
