= Escape Island =

Island of Western Australia

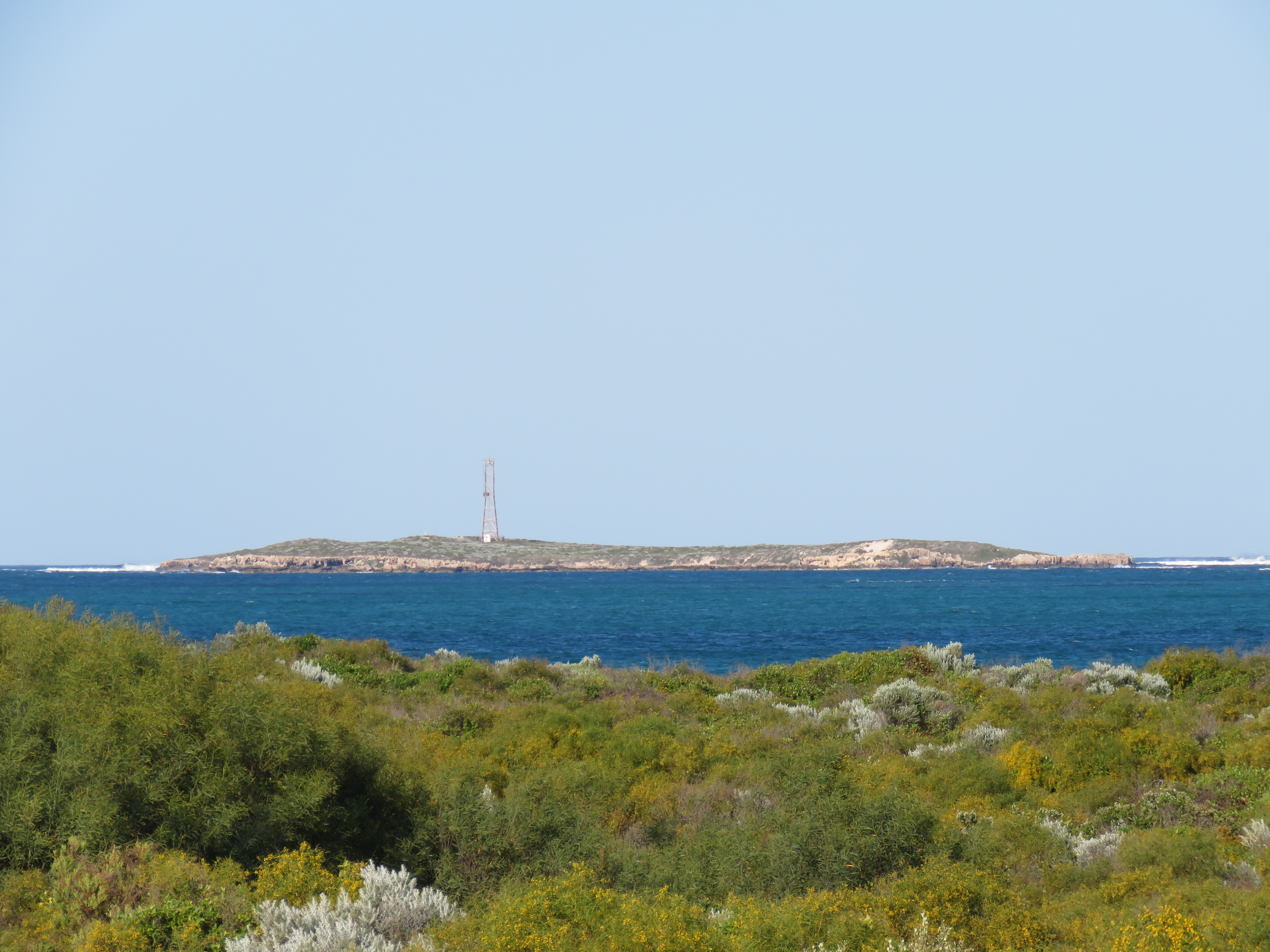
- Escape Island and lighthouse seen from Jurien Bay

Geography
- Location: Indian Ocean
- Coordinates: 30°20′03″S 114°59′05″E

Administration
- Australia
- State: Western Australia
- LGA: Shire of Dandaragan

Escape Island is an island near Jurien Bay in Western Australia. It is located within the Jurien Bay Marine Park and part of the Escape Island Nature Reserve.

== Description ==
The island has an area of 27.33 hectares (68 acres), is located 5.0 kilometres (3 mi) from the mainland, at the southern end of Jurien Bay, and has a maximum elevation of 12 metres (39 ft).

The island is part of the Turquoise Coast islands nature reserve group, a chain of 40 islands spread over a distance of 150 kilometres (93 mi).

== Geology ==
The islands were formed approximately 10,000 years ago after large fluctuations in sea levels caused erosion on large areas of the continental shelf during periods of glaciation. Large parallel sand dunes then formed and hardened into limestone, forming islands, most of which have been separated from the mainland for 6,500 years.

Well preserved Tamala limestone geological features can be found on the islands, including the fragile fossil root networks known as rhizoliths that are found on Escape Island.

== Fauna ==
The Jurien Bay skink is found on the island, inhabiting the crevices in the limestone rocks. The bull skink is also found but lives in shallow burrows in the sandy soil. King's skinks are also found on the island but tend to inhabit the petrel burrows that are also found on the island.

In 1999, 40 dibblers that were bred at Perth Zoo were released on the island under the wildlife recovery program Western Shield.

== See also ==
- List of islands of Western Australia
