= Fitzroy Island =

Fitzroy Island may refer to:

- Fitzroy Island (Antarctica)
- Fitzroy Island, Queensland
  - Fitzroy Island National Park
- Fitzroy Islands (Tasmania)
