= Comboyuro Point Light =

Lighthouse in Queensland, Australia

Comboyuro Point Lighthouse
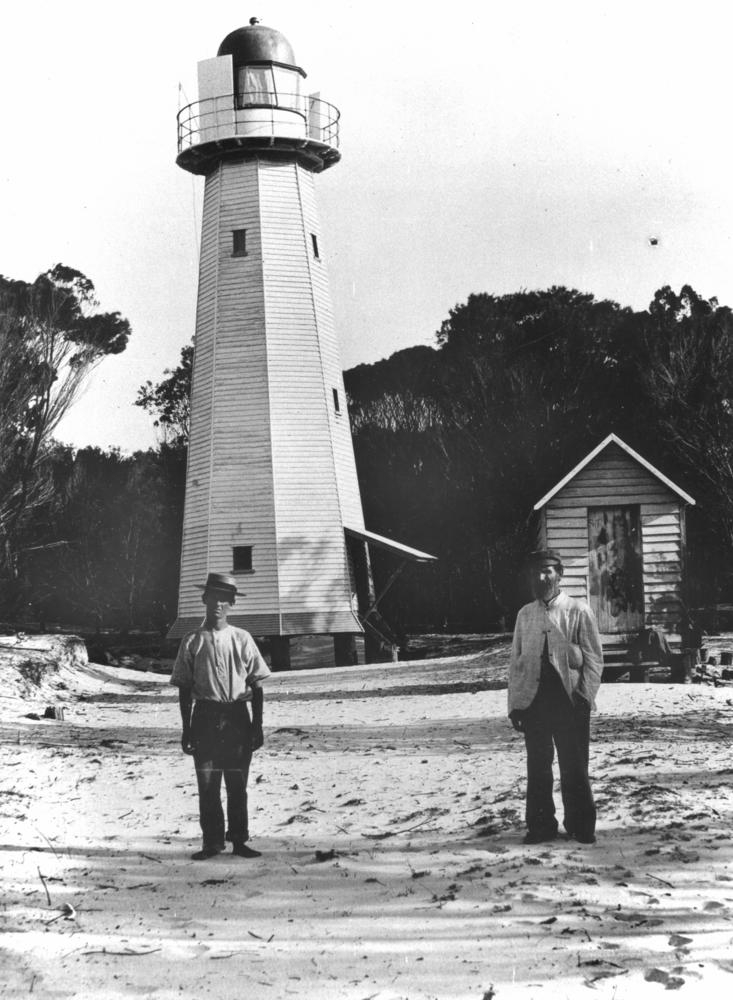
- Comboyuro Point Light in 1906
- Location: Moreton Island; Queensland; Australia
- Coordinates: 27°03′42″S 153°21′47″E

Tower
- Constructed: 1874
- Construction: wooden tower
- Automated: 1954
- Shape: octagonal tower with balcony and lantern
- Markings: white tower

Light
- Deactivated: 1960
- Light source: acetylene
- Range: 9 nautical miles (17 km; 10 mi)

Comboyuro Point Light, which was also known later as Comboyuro Light, was located on Comboyuro Point, at the northwestern tip of Moreton Island. It is one of the Moreton Island lighthouses.

== History ==
The first navigational aid at the point was a lightroom erected in 1863 with kerosene burners. In 1867 the lightroom was replaced with a wooden tower. A taller wooden tower was erected in 1874 or in 1877, and a condensing apparatus was installed. The old tower was moved to Burnett Heads together with the old apparatus from Cowan Cowan Point Light, and is now known as the Old Burnett Heads Light, while the old apparatus was refurbished and installed at Cleveland Point Light. A 1909 listing describes the tower as a wooden tower, carrying a fixed fourth order dioptric apparatus. The light was showing red and white sectors, and visible for 9 nautical miles (17 km; 10 mi). Due to coastal erosion the tower had to be moved inland twice, 200 feet (61 m) in 1890 and another 366 feet (112 m) in 1905. In 1906 the lighthouse keeper's cottage, a four bedroom weatherboard house with galvanized iron roof, had to be moved as well. In 1954 the light was converted to acetylene gas, automated, and demanned. In October 1960 the lighthouse was discontinued due to erosion, and later that year collapsed into the sea. The keeper's cottage was demolished in the 1960s. The 2010 List of Lights does not list a light at the location.

== See also ==
- List of lighthouses in Australia
