= Fitzroy Island Light =

- Location: Fitzroy Island, Queensland, Australia
- Coordinates: 16°55′34″S 146°00′07″E

Tower
- Constructed: 1973
- Construction: concrete tower, tile covered
- Height: 56 ft (17 m)
- Shape: octagonal tower
- Markings: white tower

Light
- First lit: 1973
- Deactivated: 1992
- Little Fitzroy Island Light
- Constructed: 1992
- Construction: fiberglass tower
- Height: 4 m (13 ft)
- Shape: cylinder
- Markings: white tower
- Operator: Australian Maritime Safety Authority
- Focal height: 33 m (108 ft)
- Characteristic: Fl(3) WRG 15s

Fitzroy Island Light is an inactive lighthouse on Fitzroy Island, a continental island 29 kilometres (18 mi) southeast of Cairns, Queensland, Australia. It was only active between 1973 and 1992 but, together with Little Fitzroy Island Light, there has been a light station in the area since 1929.

== History ==
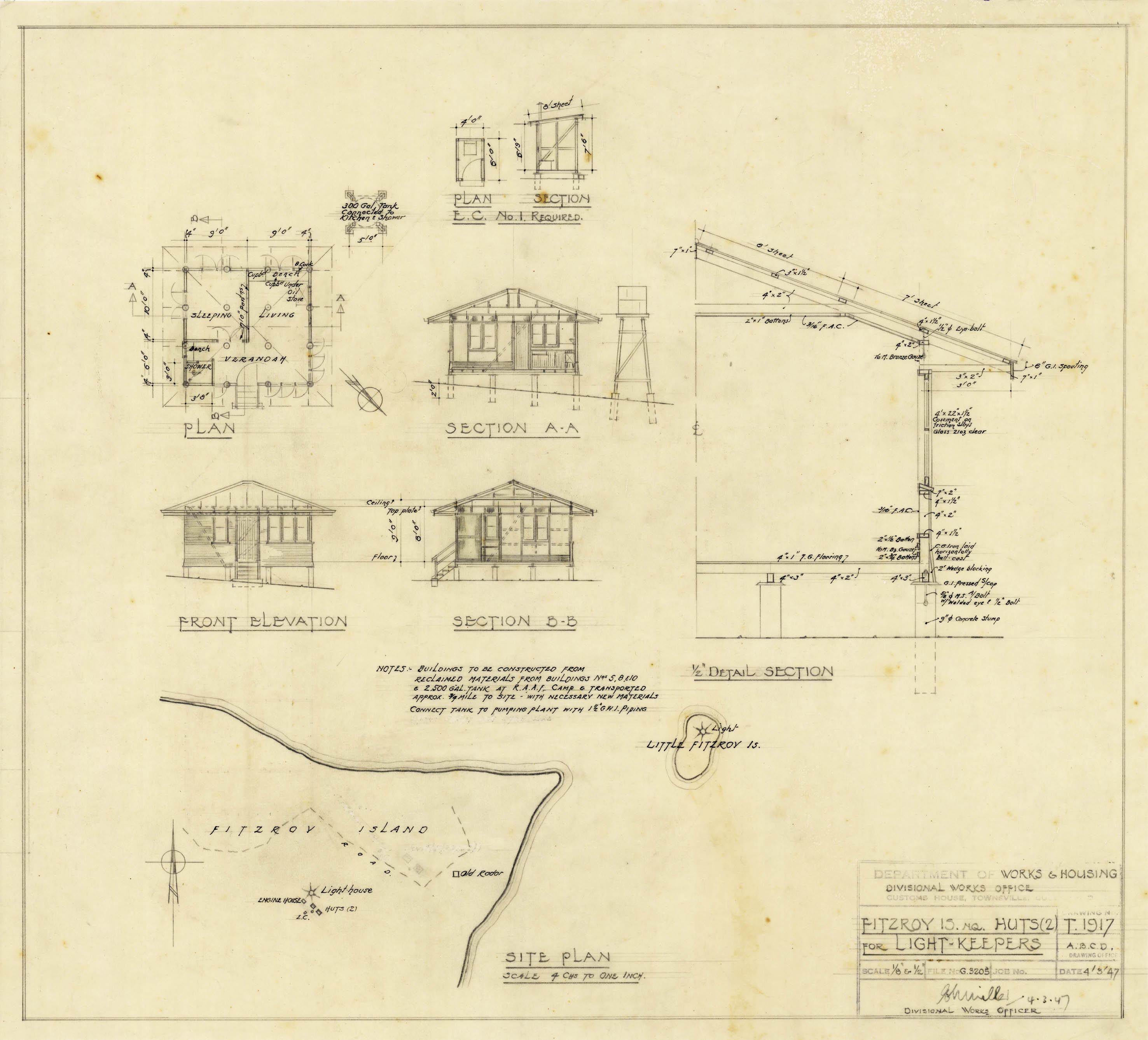
Plans for the Fitzroy Island lightstation housing, 1947

The first station in the area was established on nearby Little Fitzroy Island in 1929, to warn ships in the Grafton Passage of the reefs around the island. The station on Fitzroy Island was established in 1943, during World War II, to supplement the Little Fitzroy Island Light.

The light characteristic shown by the 1943 light was unique in Australia, and perhaps in the world, in that the characteristic seen (and not just the light colour) was dependent on the direction, corresponding to different Morse code signals. In the direction 217°, the middle of the channel, it showed a group of four flashes every 16 seconds. North of that direction, the first two flashes looked like a single long flash, resulting in one long flash followed by two short flashes, i.e. a Morse code "D" (go down). South of 217°, it would show two short flashes followed by a long flash, i.e. a Morse code "U" (go up). That was achieved by using two synchronised rotating bullseye lens panels, which had been taken from the first-order lens formerly at Cape Northumberland Lighthouse .

In 1973, the present Fitzroy Island lighthouse was constructed, being the fifth of a group of seven concrete towers erected in Queensland between 1964 and 1979. In order of construction, they were Cape Capricorn Light, New Caloundra Light, Point Danger Light, New Burnett Heads Light, Fitzroy Island Light, Point Cartwright Light and Archer Point Light. At that same time, the Little Fitzroy Island Light was deactivated. The light source was an array of sealed beam lamps.

In 1992, the Fitzroy Island lighthouse was deactivated, and Little Fitzroy Island Light made active again after a re-build. The lighthouse on Fitzroy Island served as a visitor centre for the Fitzroy Island National Park, however, is now closed to the public.

== Structures ==
The lighthouse is octagonal in form, topped with a lantern and a gallery. It is made of concrete and covered with tiles, much like Point Cartwright Light and New Burnett Heads Light.

The site also includes several preserved lighthouse keeper cottages and auxiliary buildings.

== Site operation and visiting ==
Fitzroy Island is accessible by ferry from Cairns, and the lighthouse is a 3.6 kilometres (2.2 mi) hike from the ferry landing. The site is open, although the tower is closed to the public. It is operated by the Queensland Parks and Wildlife Service as part of the Fitzroy Island National Park. The lamp from the last lighthouse is on display at the Cairns Historical Society Museum.

== See also ==
- List of lighthouses in Australia
