= Point Cartwright =

Coordinates: 26°40′46″S 153°08′19″E

Point Cartwright is a rocky headland at the mouth of the Mooloolah River in the Sunshine Coast Region, Queensland, Australia, known for its scenery and landmark lighthouse, Point Cartwright Light. It is located 14 km north of Caloundra.

== History ==
The headland was named Point Raper in 1861 by Lieutenant Heath of the Royal Navy. Circa 1885, the current name of Point Cartwright was bestowed on the point. It is not known who changed the name to Point Cartwright or why it was changed.

It is thought to have been named after Edmund Cartwright who developed weaving and combing equipment in the industrial revolution. Cartwright's invention was closely associated with Sir Richard Arkwright's machinery invented for cotton spinning factories. It is thought that at the same time that Point Cartwright was named, the headland known as Petrie Heads was also renamed to Point Arkwright.

The New Caloundra Light built in 1967 became ineffective towards the end of the 1970s and so in May 1978 construction started on Point Cartwright Light, being officially opened on 10 September 1979.
