= Cape Capricorn Light =

Lighthouse in Queensland, Australia

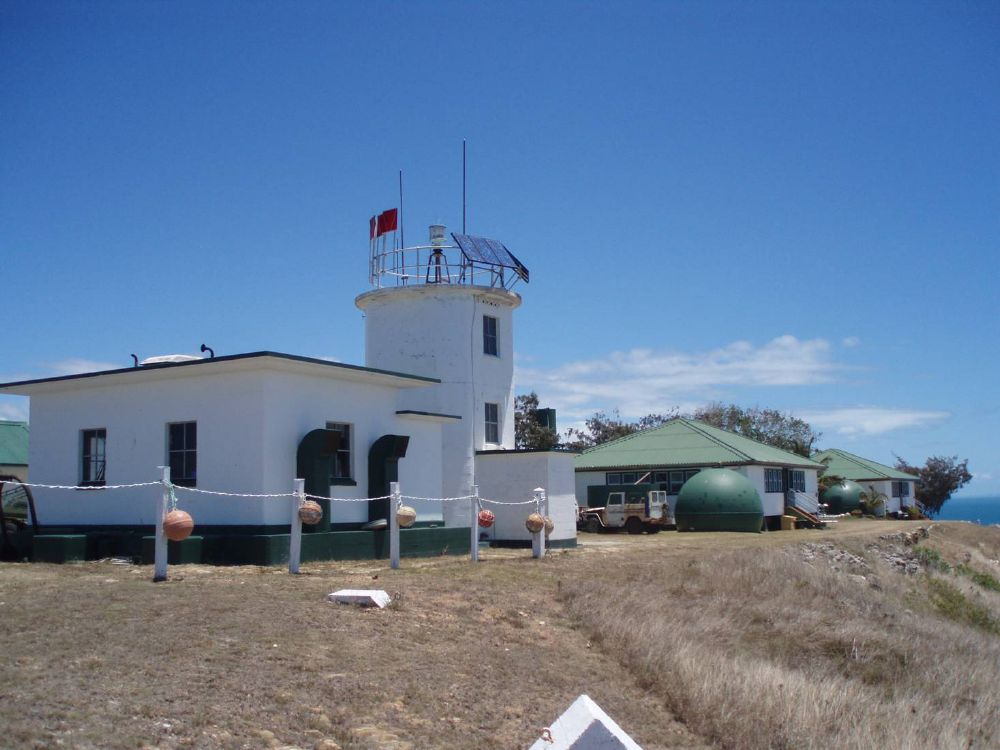
- Cape Capricorn Light, 2008
- Location: Cape Capricorn; Queensland; Australia
- Coordinates: 23.4872°S 151.2348°E

Tower
- Constructed: 1875 (first); 1936 (second)
- Construction: concrete blocks
- Height: 23 feet (7.0 m)
- Shape: square prism chamfered corners tower with balcony and no lantern
- Markings: white tower
- Power source: solar power
- Operator: Australian Maritime Safety Authority
- Heritage: listed on the Queensland Heritage Register

Light
- First lit: 1964 (current)
- Focal height: 305 feet (93 m)
- Range: white: 16 nmi (30 km; 18 mi) red: 12 nmi (22 km; 14 mi)
- Characteristic: Fl WR 5s

Cape Capricorn Light is an active heritage-listed lighthouse located on Cape Capricorn, a coastal headland on the northeast point of Curtis Island, in Gladstone Region, Central Queensland, Australia. The lighthouse, constructed in 1964, is the third at this site, following a timber frame lighthouse constructed in 1875 and a concrete lighthouse constructed around 1937. It was added to the Queensland Heritage Register on 31 August 2001.

== History ==
=== First lighthouse ===
The separation of the colony of Queensland from New South Wales took place with the signing of Letters Patent by Queen Victoria in 1859. The need for pilot assistance accessing the mouth of Fitzroy River and the Port of Rockhampton necessitates the construction of a pilot station on Curtis Island. The first permanent station was established on Cape Capricorn as early as 1861. Though it was moved to Grassy Hill three years later, the need for a lighthouse at Cape Capricorn remained a priority.

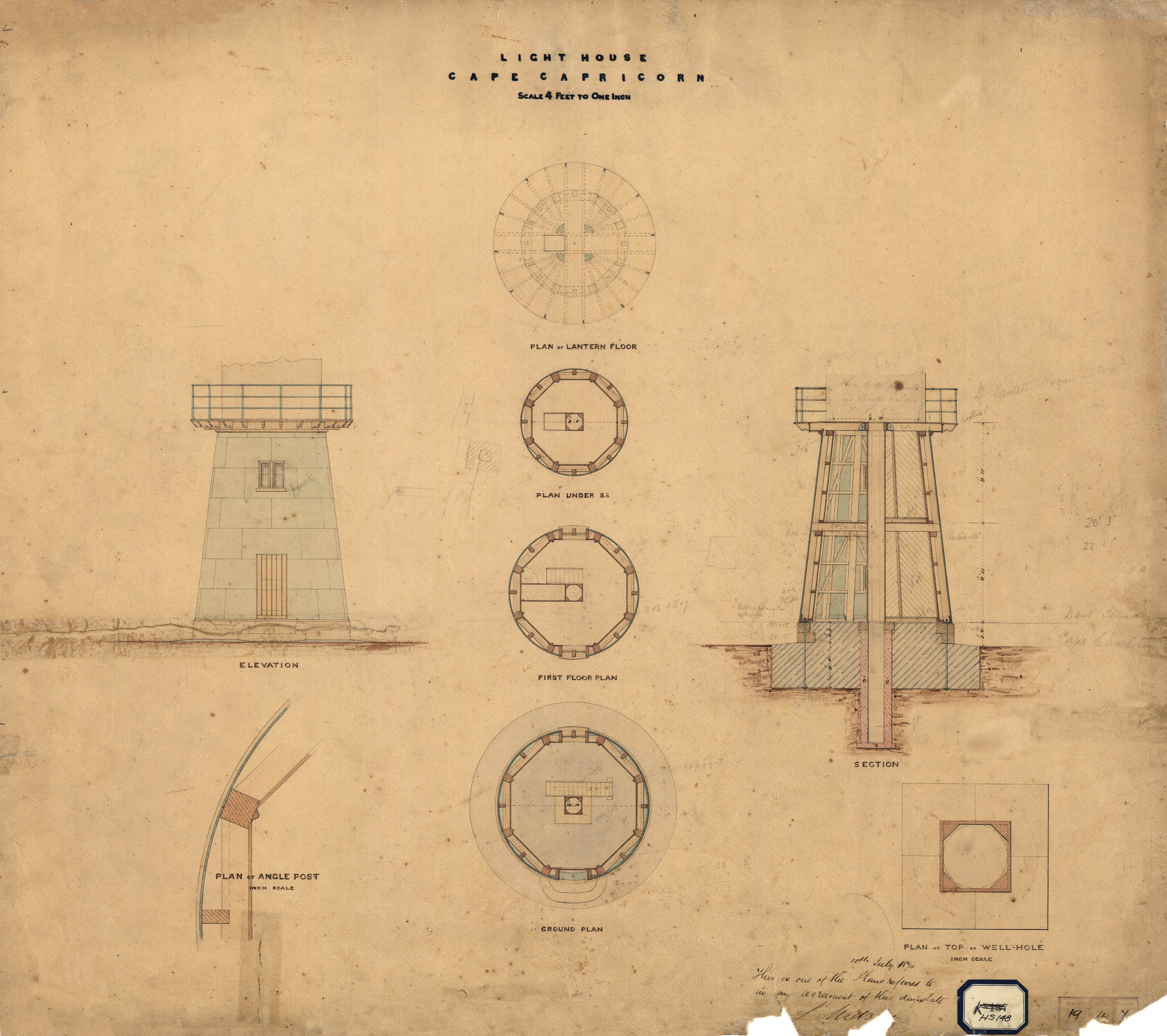
1874 plans for the first lighthouse

Plans for a lighthouse and cottages were prepared in early 1874 by the office of F. D. G. Stanley, Queensland Colonial Architect, with an estimated cost of £1460 for the lighthouse and cottages. The lighthouse, a typical Queensland timber-framed and iron clad structure, was to be prefabricated and built in Brisbane. However, the only response to the first tender was an overpriced offer of £2850. The second tender was more successful, the winning offer being by James Midson for £1046/10/-. The construction was completed sometime in October 1874, and an additional contract was granted to Midson for the erection of the structures on the site for the sum of £753. Quite remarkably, a last minute change in the order of the lantern from England meant that no lamp room was ordered. An urgent request for an additional £180 was made by Stanley for construction of a lamp room from timber framing with iron plating, instead of the planned cast iron one. The lighthouse was operational around late July 1875. The original light source was an oil wick burner. An 1895 survey also reports two additional auxiliary lights on Cape Capricorn, to the north and southeast of the main lighthouse.

Supplying the station was done from Rockhampton, and was quite a difficult task. Supplies were brought to the base of the hill by steamboat and then manually winched up over 91 metres (299 ft) on a tramway. An assessment made by Commander Brewis in 1912 recommended increasing the power of the light, adjusting the eastern auxiliary light, renovating the dwellings, repairing the tramway and supplying steam winches. However, this recommendation was to be followed very slowly and partially. However, in July 1915 the lighthouse was transferred to the control of the federal government, and it took eight more years until in 1923 the light source was finally replaced with a 55 millimetres (2.2 in) incandescent vapourised kerosene mantle. In January 1936 plans were prepared for electrification of the light. However, it is not clear if this change was made, as in the same year it was decided to replace the tower.

=== Second lighthouse ===
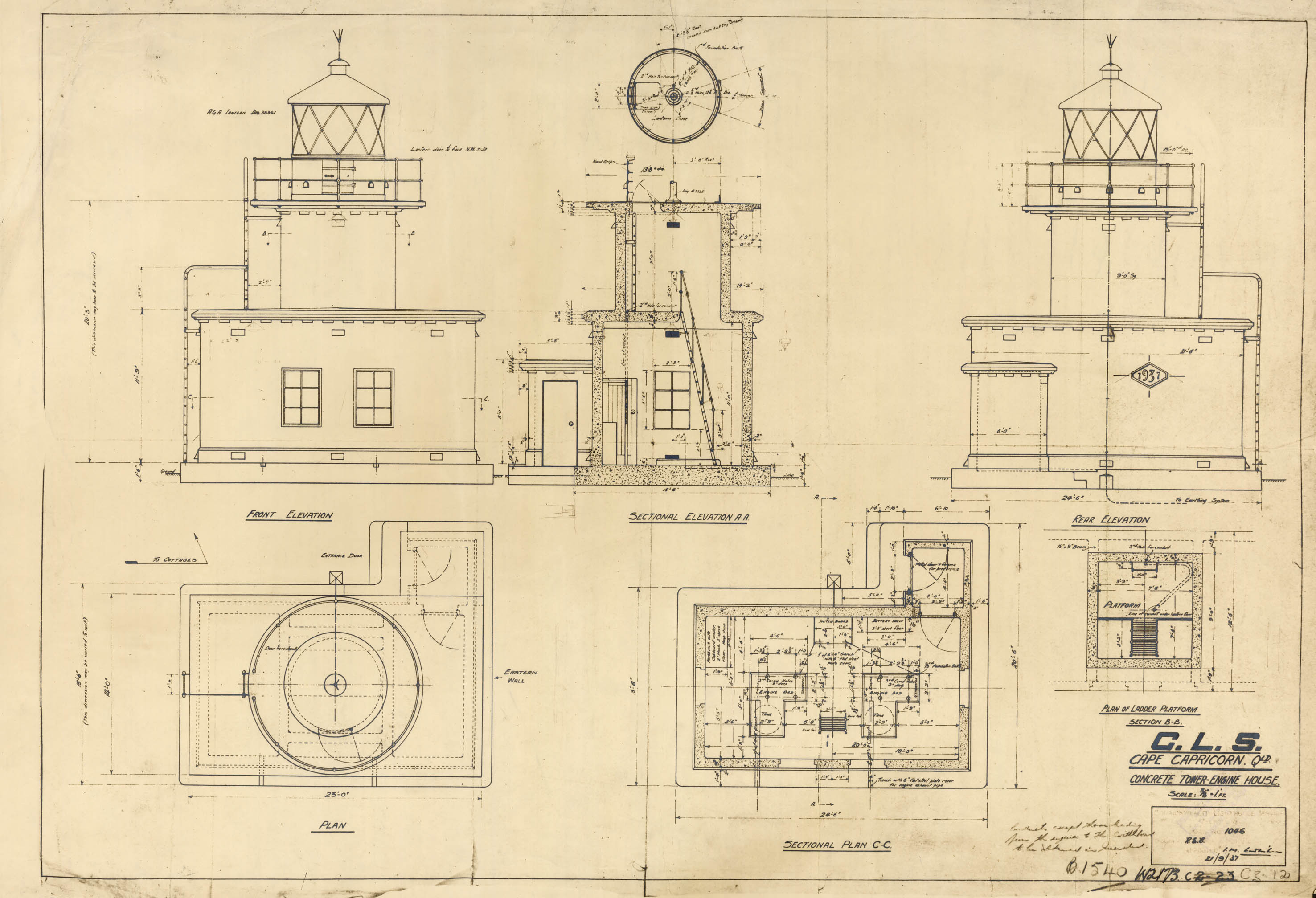
Plans for the second lighthouse, 1937

In 1936 the Commonwealth government decided to replace the tower with a new concrete block lighthouse, and plans were prepared in September 1937.

The new tower was a 6-metre-high (20 ft) square structure, with an adjoined powerhouse. The tower was topped by a cantilevered circular balcony and a small circular lantern. At the same time the residences and service buildings were also replaced with timber-framed asbestos clad structures. The new lighthouse was made operative with electric power in 1938. However, from undetermined reasons this lighthouse was to be short-lived, surviving only 26 years more to be replaced by a new structure in 1964.

=== Third lighthouse ===
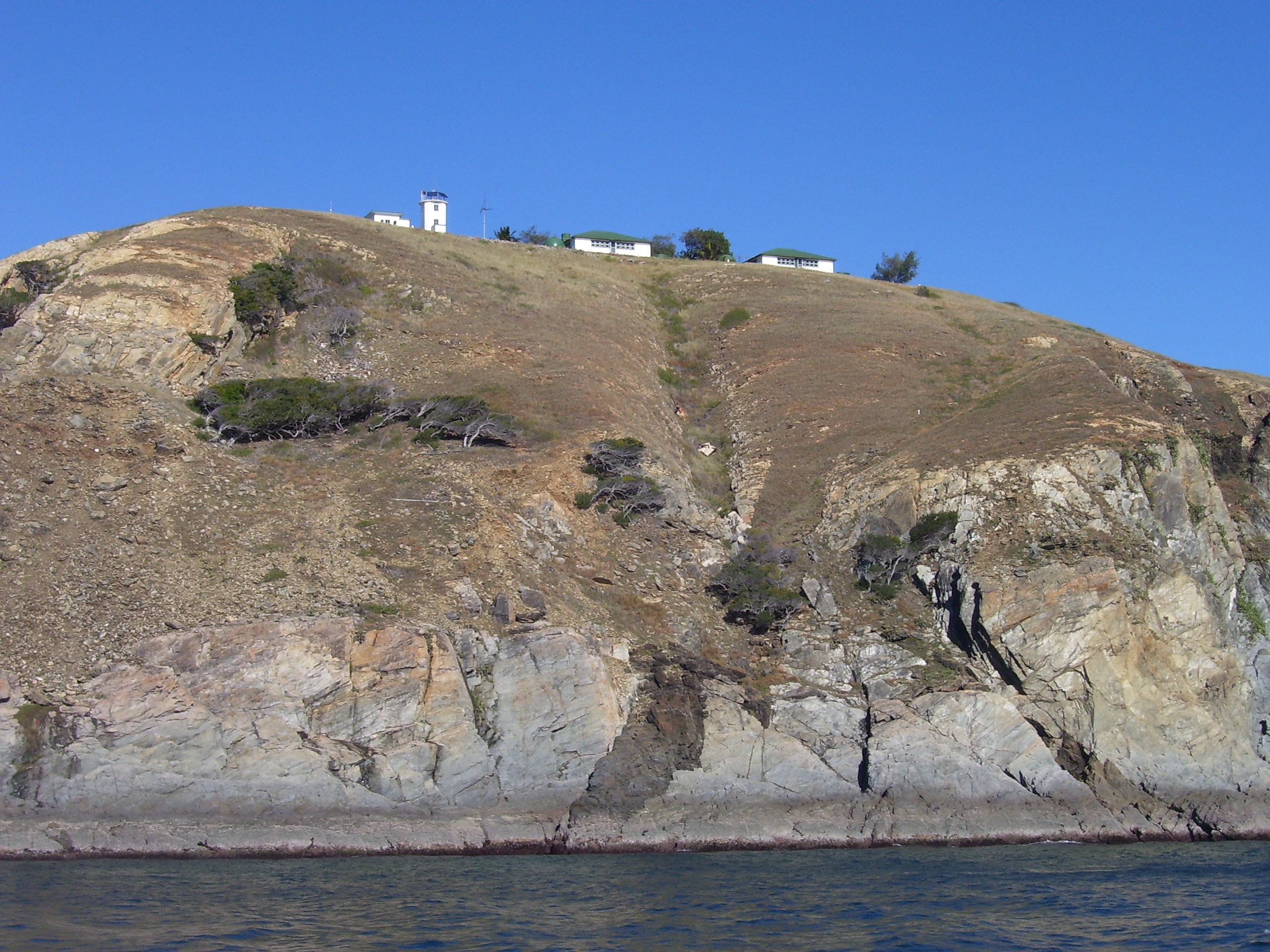
Cape Capricorn Light from the sea, 2007

Plans for a new powerhouse and lighthouse were made in January 1962 and July 1963 respectively. By 1964 construction was complete and the new light was operational. It was the first of a group of seven concrete towers erected between 1964 and 1979, followed by New Caloundra Light, Point Danger Light, New Burnett Heads Light, Fitzroy Island Light, Point Cartwright Light and Archer Point Light. In 1968 the light source was converted to 240 V AC operation.

Since its construction and until 1978, Cape Capricorn lightstation served as the base radio station for a network of lighthouses in the area including North Reef Light, Lady Elliot Island Light, Pine Islet Light and Dent Island Light. On 18 December 1978 this role was transferred to Bustard Head Light.

On 8 December 1983, the House Standing Committee on Expenditure tabled its report on the inquiry into lightstations entitled "Lighthouses: Do we keep the keepers?". The report recommended the demanning of 24 lightstation, including Cape Capricorn. In 1988 the station was finally converted to solar power (and presumably demanned). The lantern has been removed, and a self-contained beacon was installed. Ownership of the station was transferred to the Great Barrier Reef Marine Park Authority in 1991, back to the Australian Maritime Safety Authority in 1995 and then to the Queensland Government in July 1997, which employs a caretaker at one of the residences. The rest are privately leased.

== Current display ==
The light characteristic shown is one flash every five seconds, white/red depending on sector (Fl.W.R. 5s). White is shown 005°-307°, visible for 16 nautical miles (30 km; 18 mi). Red is shown 307°-005°, visible for 12 nautical miles (22 km; 14 mi). The light source is a 120 Volt tungsten-halogen lamp, fed from diesel alternators.

== Structures ==
The current tower is 6.4 metres (21 ft) high, constructed of concrete blocks in a square plan with chamfered corners, with a small porch at the base. A round gallery surrounded with a metal rail overhangs the tower. A self-contained beacon is installed on top of the gallery.

The keeper's residence includes two cottages, timber-framed, clad with asbestos cement sheets and timber battens, painted white. The gabled roofs are clad with corrugated iron, painted green. Other similarly constructed structures at the premises include a store, the old powerhouse and a winch house, all mounted on high concrete foundations. The new powerhouse, constructed in 1964, is constructed of concrete blocks, painted white. It includes a large main room and an adjoined porch, both with projecting flat concrete roofs. There are also other sheds of small to medium size on the site, mostly timber-framed with corrugated iron walls and roof.

Also notable is the still functional rail line, a cement pathway with steel rails going down to the beach. It includes a trolley of timber on a metal base, a metal rope, a winch and a motor. There is also a cement helipad close by.

There are also some remains in the area. These include two nonoperational auxiliary leading lights, the western light timber-framed clad with fibro and the eastern one made of concrete. The remains of the previous lighthouses are in a gully north of the station

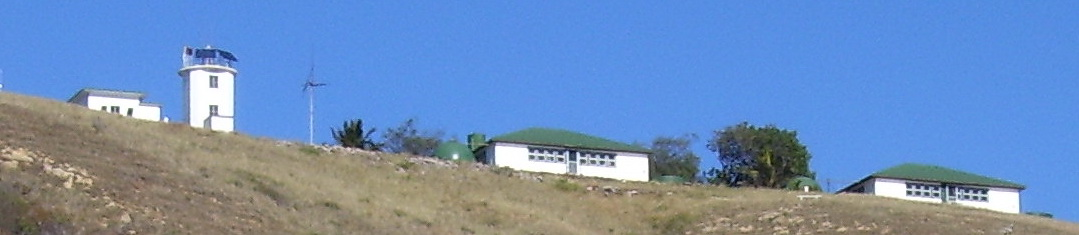
The lighthouse and the cottages

== Site operation and visiting ==
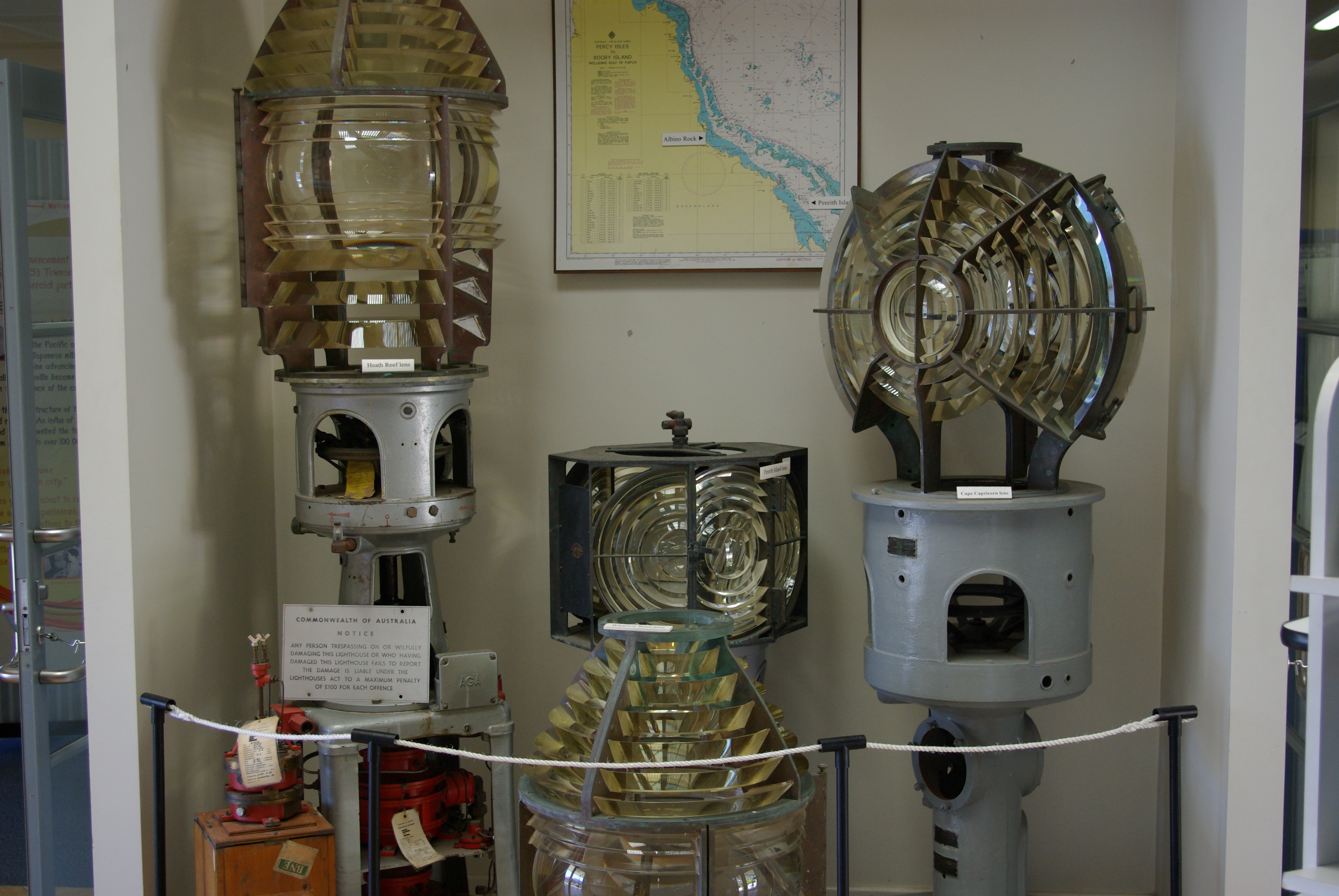
Lenses on display at Townsville Maritime Museum, Cape Capricorn's original lens on the top right

The light is operated by the Australian Maritime Safety Authority. The site manager is the Queensland Parks and Wildlife Service, as part of the Curtis Island National Park. The island is accessible only by boat or helicopter. The tower is closed to the public, but accommodations are available at the site, including two homesteads and two cabins. The original lens used is currently on display at the Townsville Maritime Museum.

== See also ==
- List of lighthouses in Australia
