= Point Cartwright Light =

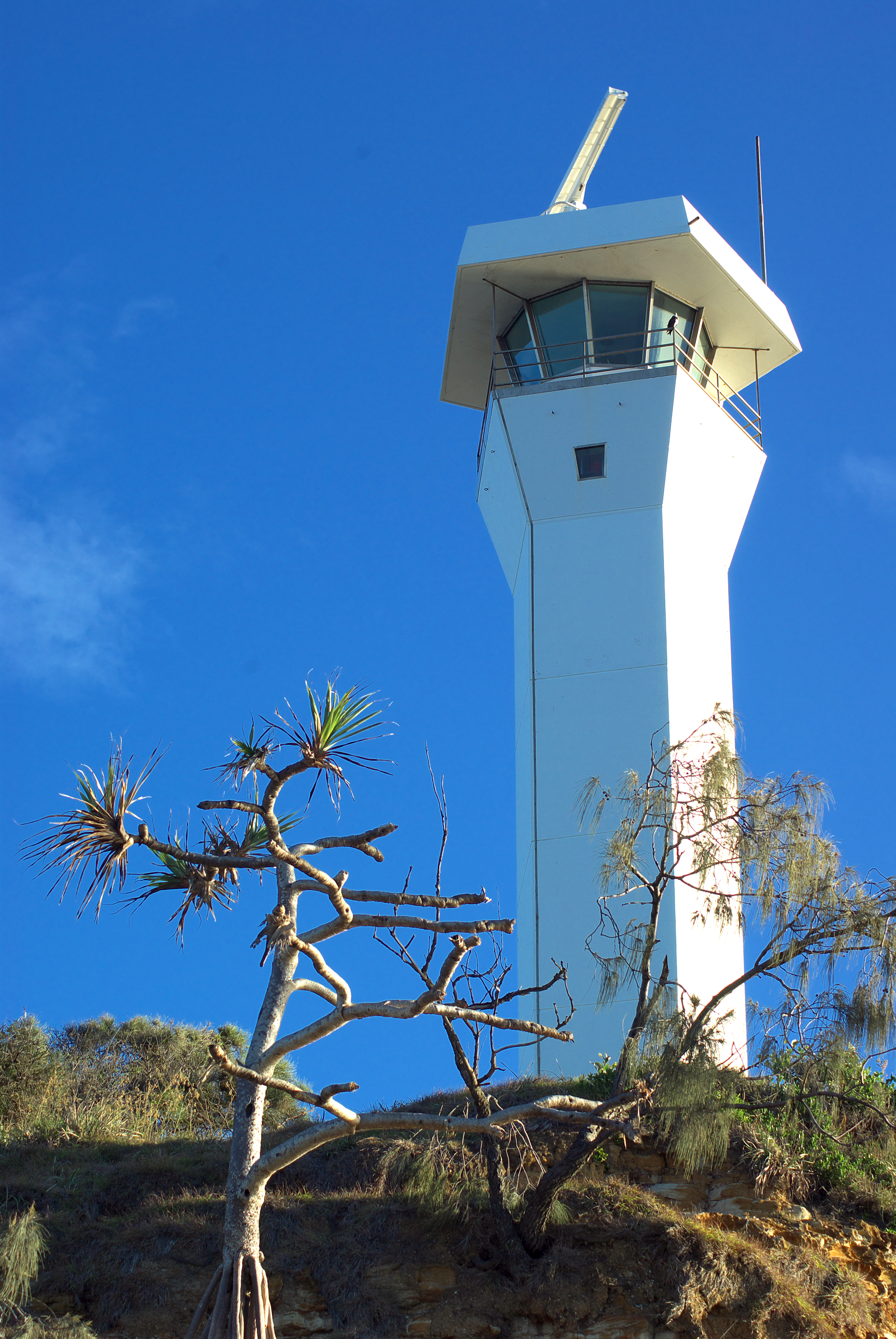
- Point Cartwright Light, 2007
- Location: Point Cartwright; Queensland; Australia
- Coordinates: 26°40′46.94″S 153°08′18.45″E

Tower
- Constructed: 1978
- Construction: reinforced concrete
- Automated: 1978
- Height: 105 feet (32 m)
- Shape: pentagonal tower
- Markings: white tower and lantern
- Power source: mains electricity
- Operator: Australian Maritime Safety Authority

Light
- Focal height: 174 feet (53 m)
- Intensity: white: 310,000 cd red: 2,100 cd
- Range: white: 23 nmi (43 km) red: 11 nmi (20 km)
- Characteristic: Fl (3) WR 15s.

Point Cartwright Light is an active lighthouse located on Point Cartwright, a point near the mouth of the Mooloolah River, in Mooloolaba, Queensland, Australia. It marks the entrance to the North West Channel, a deep water channel into Moreton Bay and the Port of Brisbane, and provides guidance into the Mooloolaba Harbour.

== History ==
Old Caloundra Light, construction in 1896, was the first to serve the purpose of marking the entrance to the North West Channel. Changes in the shipping industry in the 1960s necessitated the construction of a modern signal and radar station, and thus New Caloundra Light was erected in 1967. However, New Caloundra Light was to have a short lifespan as a coastal light. By 1978 the buildings in Caloundra had grown in height, obscuring it from some angles.

Point Cartwright Light was built in 1978. It was the sixth of a group of seven concrete towers erected by the Commonwealth between 1964 and 1979, by order of construction, Cape Capricorn Light, New Caloundra Light, Point Danger Light, New Burnett Heads Light, Fitzroy Island Light, itself and Archer Point Light. The light was automatic from its construction and was never staffed.

== Current display ==
The light characteristic shown is three flashes every fifteen seconds, Red at 088°-180°, visible for 11 nautical miles (20 km; 13 mi) and White at 180°-345°, visible for 23 nautical miles (43 km; 26 mi) The red sector provides guidance into the Mooloolaba Harbour, while the white sector serves the original purpose of marking the entrance to the North West Channel. The light source is a 200 Watt sealed beam array, fed from the mains electricity, with a diesel generator and batteries for backup. The intensity of the white flashes is 310,000 cd, while that of the red flashes is only 2,100 cd. This is achieved by a filter and a red plexiglas screen.

== Site operation and visiting ==
The site and the light are operated by the Australian Maritime Safety Authority. The site is open to the public, but the tower is closed.

== See also ==
- List of lighthouses in Australia
