= Old Burnett Heads Light =

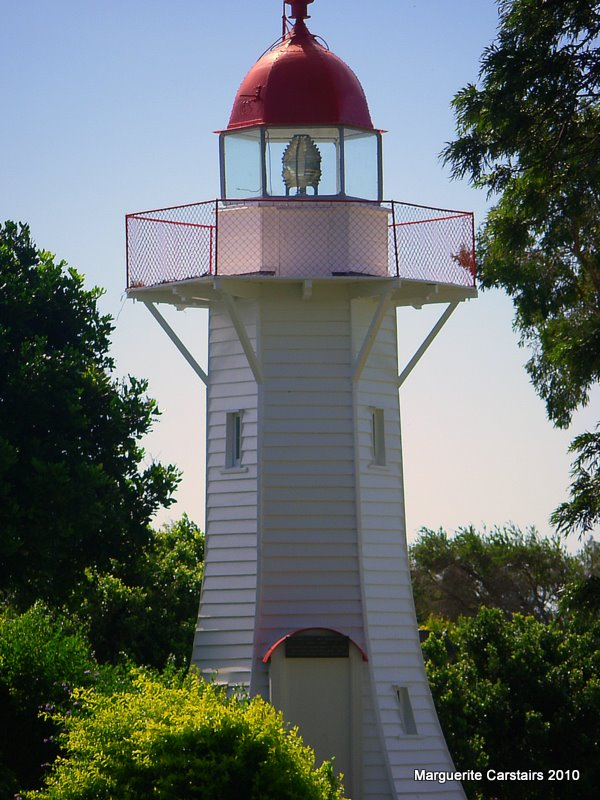
- Old Burnett Heads Light, 2010
- Location: Burnett Heads; Queensland; Australia
- Coordinates: 24°45′48.96″S 152°24′32.83″E

Tower
- Constructed: 1873
- Construction: timber frame clad with weatherboards
- Automated: 1932
- Height: 30 feet (9.1 m)
- Shape: tapered hexagonal tower with balcony and lantern
- Markings: white tower, red lantern dome

Light
- Deactivated: 1971
- Lens: fifth order Fresnel lens

The Old Burnett Heads Light is an inactive lighthouse which used to be located on the south side of the Burnett River entrance, in Burnett Heads, Queensland, Australia. It was relocated to the Burnett Heads Lighthouse Holiday Park. It is one of only two lighthouse surviving to be constructed of timber frame clad with weatherboards, the other being the original Cleveland Point Light.

== History ==
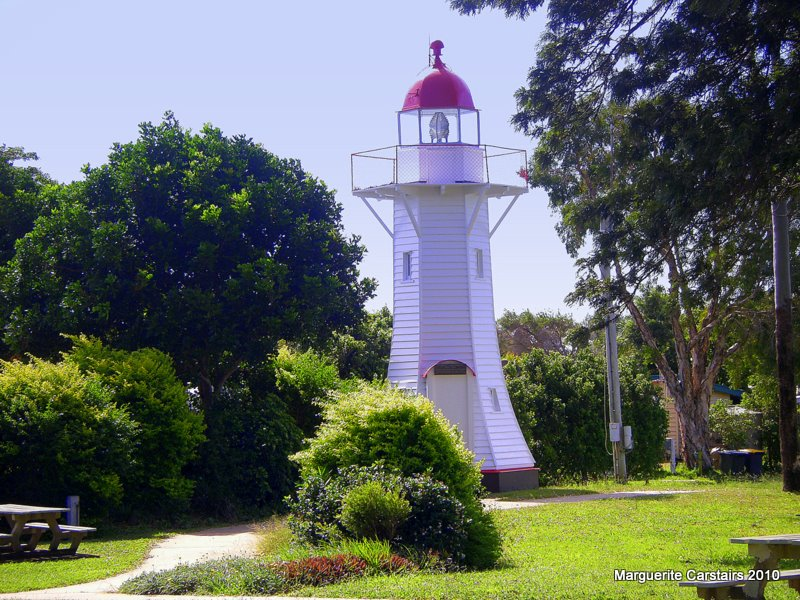
The Burnett Heads Lighthouse Holiday Park

In the early 1870s Comboyuro Point Light and Cowan Cowan Point Light, two of the lighthouses on Moreton Island were upgraded. A higher tower with a better apparatus was constructed for Comboyuro Point and an improved apparatus was constructed for Cowan Cowan Point. The old apparatus from Comboyuro Point was installed at Cleveland Point Light. The apparatus from Cowan Cowan Point was installed at the old tower from Comboyuro Point, and the tower was installed at the entrance to Burnett River. The date of this installation is given as either 1873 or 1874. Until 1932 it was occupied by a lighthouse keeper. In 1932 the light was converted to acetylene gas (carbide lamp), automated and demanned.

The lighthouse operated until 1971 when it was replaced by the New Burnett Heads Light. It was then relocated about 1 kilometre (0.62 mi) inland into Burnett River and restored. The concrete base and the steps of the lighthouse are still present next to the new tower. The original fifth-order Fresnel lens is still mounted in the tower.

== Site operation and visiting ==
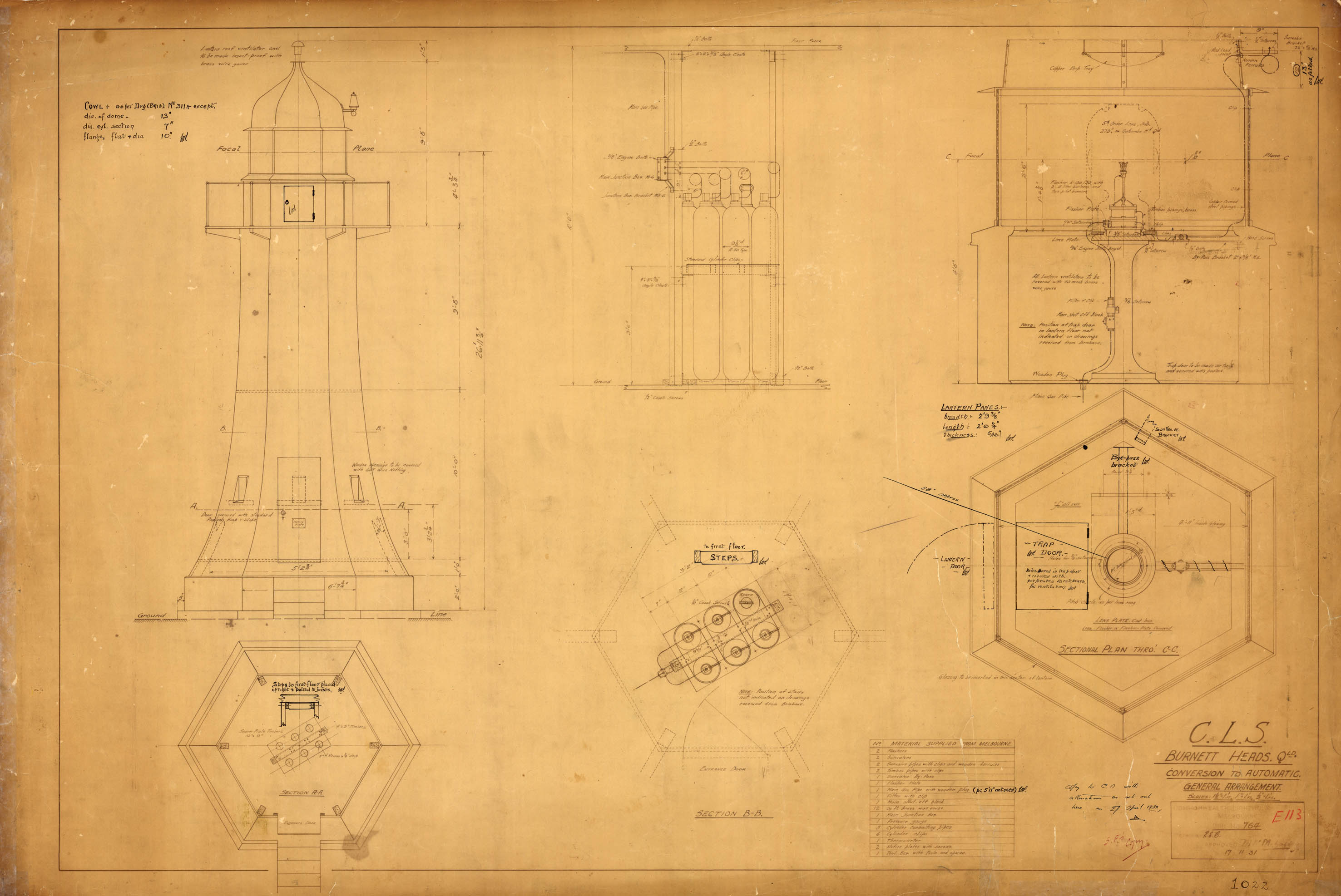
Plans for the conversion to automatic operation, 1920

The site and the lighthouse are managed by the Bundaberg Regional Council. The Burnett Heads Lighthouse Holiday Park is open, but the tower is closed to the public.

== See also ==
- List of lighthouses in Australia
