= Point Danger Light =

Lighthouse in New South Wales, Australia

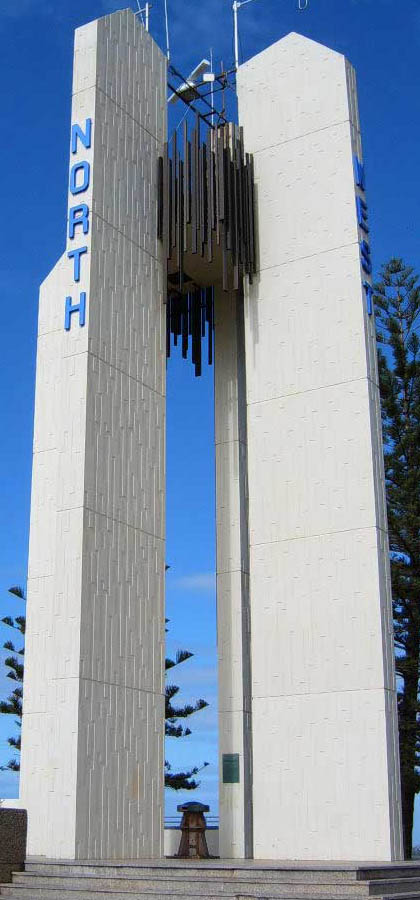
- Point Danger Light
- Location: Point Danger; Queensland; Australia
- Coordinates: 28°09′54.09″S 153°33′02.63″E

Tower
- Constructed: 1971
- Construction: concrete tower
- Automated: 1971
- Height: 67 feet (20 m)
- Shape: four rectangular pillars with a bronze sculpture suspended between them
- Markings: white columns, floodlit
- Power source: mains electricity
- Operator: Transport for NSW

Light
- Focal height: 146 feet (45 m)
- Range: 11 nautical miles (20 km; 13 mi)
- Characteristic: Fl (2) W 10s.

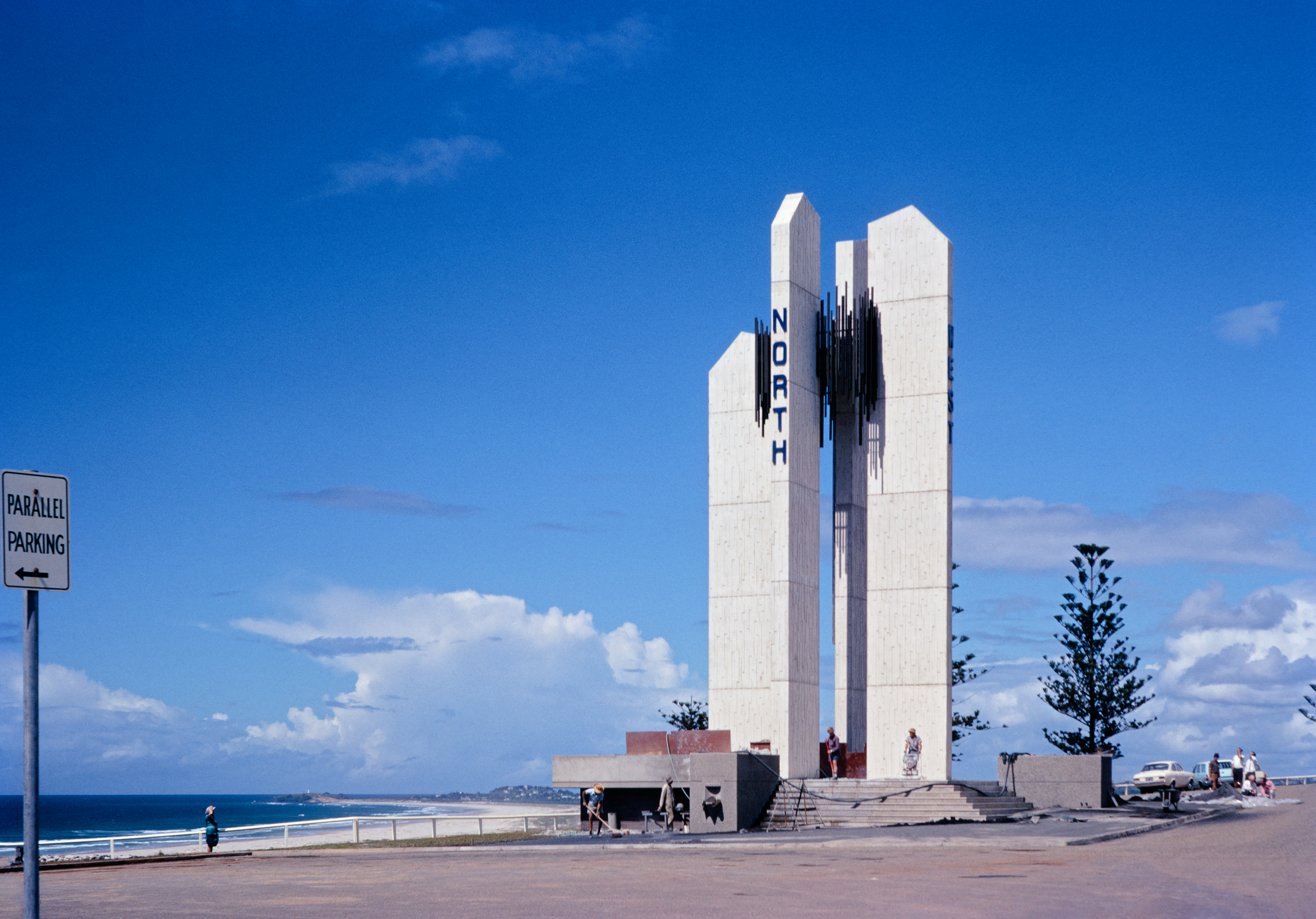
Building the Captain Cook Memorial Light, Point Danger, June 1971

Point Danger Light, also known as the Captain Cook Memorial Light, is an active lighthouse located on Point Danger, a headland between Coolangatta and Tweed Heads, marking the border between Queensland and New South Wales, Australia. It lays claim to be the first lighthouse in the world to experiment with laser as a light source.

== History ==
Point Danger Light was the third of a group of seven concrete towers erected between 1964 and 1979 in Queensland, in order of erection Cape Capricorn Light, New Caloundra Light, itself, New Burnett Heads Light, Fitzroy Island Light, Point Cartwright Light and Archer Point Light. Constructed in 1971, it commemorates the bicentennial of Captain Cook's first voyage, and specifically the voyage along the east coast of Australia in 1770. It was first exhibited on 18 April 1971.

The original light source was an experimental laser-based light, and the lighthouse may very well be the first in the world to experiment with this light source. However, the experiment failed. The laser was too narrow to be easily seen by ships. The light source was replaced in 1975 by a regular electric lamp.

== Current display ==
The light characteristic shown is two white flashes every ten seconds (Fl.(2)W. 10s), visible at 170°-330° for 11 nautical miles (20 km; 13 mi). The light source is an electric lamp, fed by a battery float charged from the mains electricity.

== Structures ==
The lighthouse is constructed of four concrete columns, marked with the four cardinal directions, and a bronze sculpture hung between the columns.

Also, near-by is a one-story building housing the Marine Rescue NSW Point Danger station.

== Site operation and visiting ==
The light is operated by Transport for NSW. The site is accessible, but the tower is closed to the public.

== See also ==
- List of lighthouses in Australia
