= Archer Point Light =

Lighthouse in Queensland, Australia

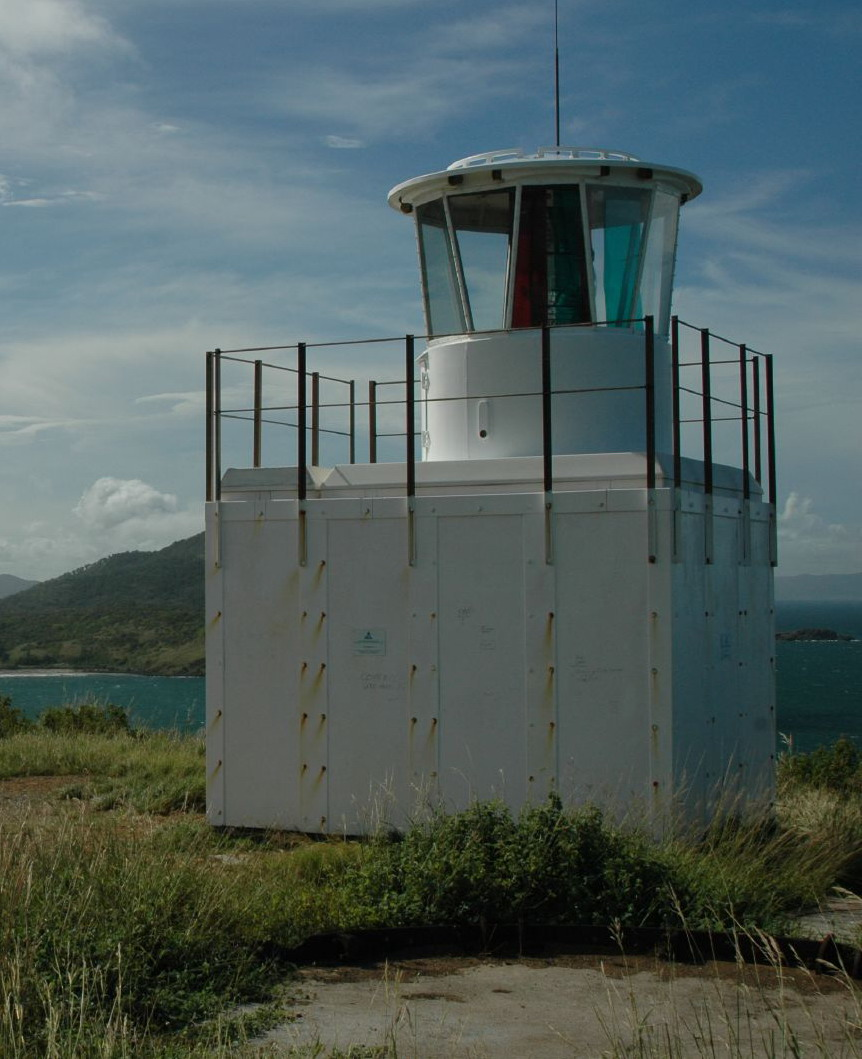
- Archer Point Light, 2005
- Location: Cooktown; Queensland; Australia
- Coordinates: 15°35′37.51″S 145°19′42.83″E

Tower
- Constructed: 1883 (first)
- Construction: concrete tower
- Automated: 1979
- Height: 19 feet (5.8 m)
- Shape: square prism equipment room with balcony and lantern
- Markings: white lantern
- Operator: Australian Maritime Safety Authority

Light
- First lit: 1979 (current)
- Focal height: 213 feet (65 m)
- Intensity: 35,000 cd
- Range: white: 17 nmi (31 km) green: 17 nmi (31 km) red: 13 nmi (24 km)
- Characteristic: Fl (4) WRG 20s.

Archer Point Light is an active lighthouse on Archer Point, a conical, 60-metre-high (200 ft) grassy headland about 29km southeast of Cooktown, Queensland, Australia. Originally an 1883 timber-framed lighthouse covered with galvanised iron, it was replaced in 1975 with a modern square concrete equipment room topped with a lantern.

== History ==
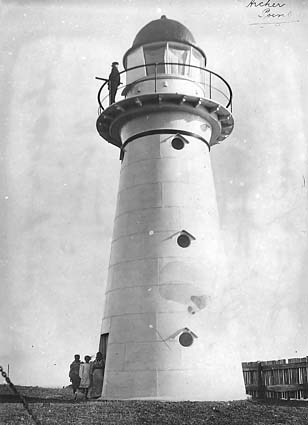
The original Archer Point Light, 1917

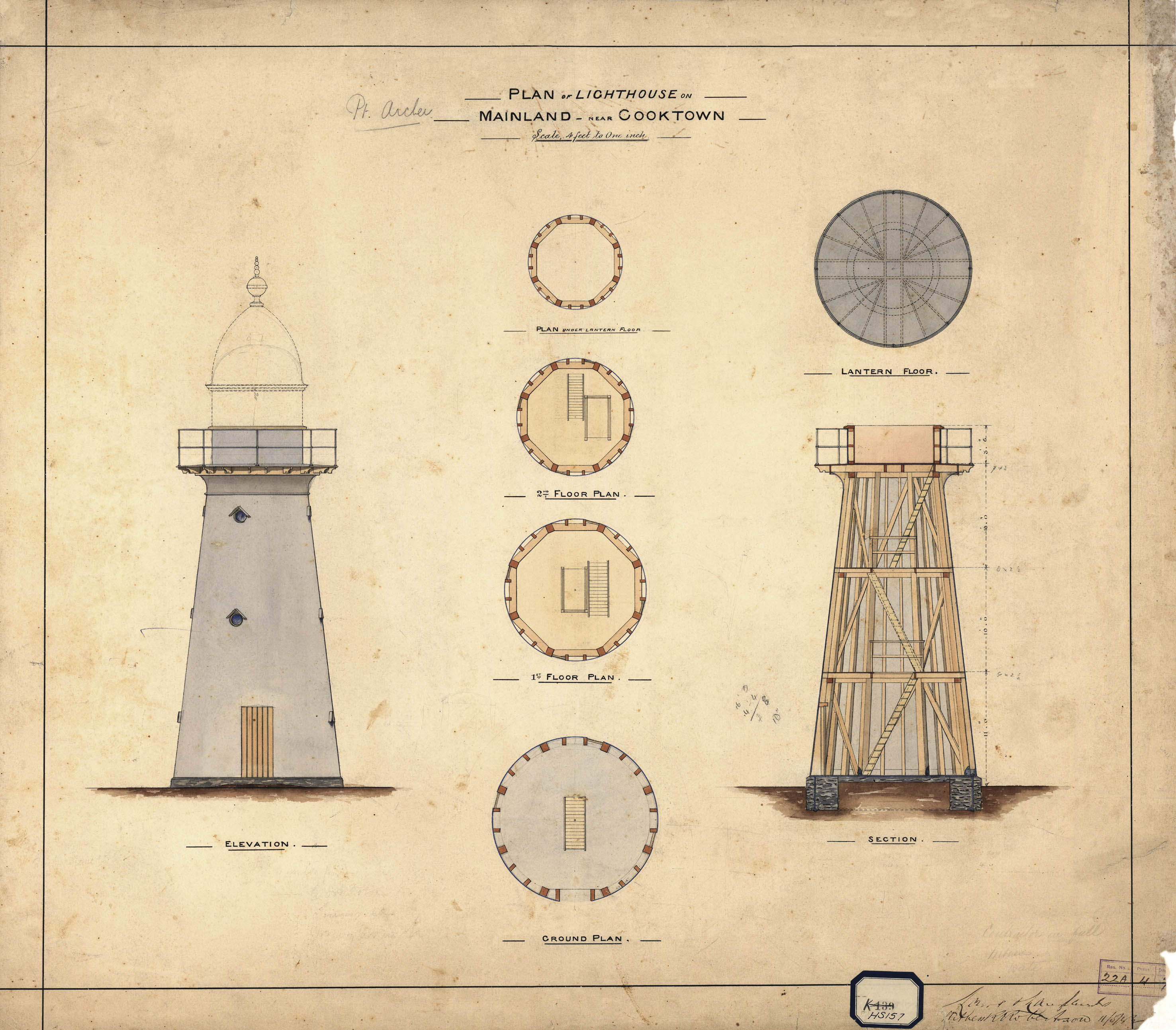
Plans for the original lighthouse, 1882

The station was established in 1883. The original lighthouse was a timber frame lighthouse covered in rolled galvanised iron sheeting, much like Low Isles Light and Flat Top Island Light. It had four floors including the gallery floor, with ladders leading from one floor to the next.

Together with a lighthouse on Rocky Island, now disused, the original light served as a lead light between Hope Islands and the mainland to the south, and between some reefs and the mainland to the north.

In 1975 the current lighthouse was built, and was automated and electrically operated to begin with. The base of the old lighthouse still exists at the location. The original lenses are now on display at the Queensland Maritime Museum.

== Current light ==
The current lighthouse is a square concrete equipment room topped with a lantern. It was the seventh and last of a group of seven concrete towers erected by the Commonwealth between 1964 and 1979. By order of construction the lights were Cape Capricorn Light, New Caloundra Light, Point Danger Light, New Burnett Heads Light, Fitzroy Island Light, Point Cartwright Light and itself.

The light characteristic shown is four flashes separated by two seconds, every twenty seconds, White at 153°-276°, 305°-313° and 334°-338°, Green at 276°-305° and 320°-334°, Red at 313°-320° and 338°-358° (Fl.(4)W.R.G. 20s). The white sector indicates the clear passage into the channel, while the red and green sectors indicate the ship is outside the channel.

The current light source is a 35,000 cd 120 Volt 1000 Watt Tungsten-halogen bulb, fed from the mains electricity, with a diesel generator for backup.

== Site operation and visiting ==
The site and the light are operated by the Australian Maritime Safety Authority. The site is open to the public, accessible by a gravel road, but the tower is closed.

== See also ==
- List of lighthouses in Australia
