= Curtis Island National Park =

National park in Australia

- IUCN category II (national park)
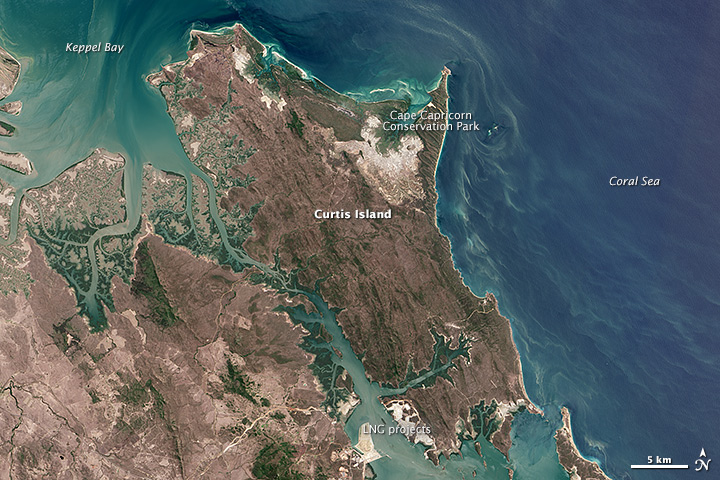
- Curtis Island

- Location within Queensland
- Location: Queensland
- Coordinates: 23.528°S 151.222°E
- Area: 15.5 km^{2} (6.0 sq mi)
- Established: 1909
- Governing body: Queensland Parks and Wildlife Service
- Website: https://parks.desi.qld.gov.au/parks/curtis-island

Curtis Island National Park is on Curtis Island, Queensland, Australia, in the Gladstone Region, 474 kilometres (295 mi) northwest of Brisbane and 40 kilometres (25 mi) southeast of Rockhampton.

The island features coastal heaths, littoral rainforest, sand dunes and beach ridges and salt flats. The national park encompasses the Cape Capricorn headland.

No facilities are provided for campers. Bush camping is permitted in three camp grounds.

The island is home to a variety of bird species.

The average elevation of the terrain is 16 metres.

== Heritage listings ==
Curtis Island has a number of heritage-listed sites, including:

- Sea Hill Light, Sea Hill Point (23.4912°S 150.9802°E)

== See also ==
- Port of Gladstone
- Protected areas of Queensland
- Yellow chat
