= Rocky Island (Queensland) =

Island in Queensland, Australia

- Interactive map of Rocky Island

Geography
- Location: Northern Australia
- Coordinates: 15.607°S 145.335°E
- Area: 0.06 km^{2} (0.023 sq mi)

Administration
- Australia
- State: Queensland

Rocky Island is an island in Walsh Bay just south of the Archer Point Light about 25 km south-east of Cooktown in the Australian state of Queensland. A lighthouse on the island, now disused, served as a lead, together with Archer Point Light, between Hope Islands and the mainland to the south, and between some reefs and the mainland to the north. It is around 6 hectares or 0.06 square km in size.
