= New Burnett Heads Light =

- Location: Burnett Heads; Queensland; Australia
- Coordinates: 24°45′29.5″S 152°24′45.7″E

Tower
- Constructed: 1971
- Construction: concrete tower
- Automated: 1971
- Height: 65 feet (20 m)
- Shape: octagonal tower with no balcony and no lantern
- Markings: white tower with a horizontal red band around the top
- Power source: mains electricity
- Operator: Australian Maritime Safety Authority

Light
- Focal height: 59 feet (18 m)
- Lens: fifth order Fresnel lens
- Intensity: 55,000 cd
- Range: 18 nautical miles (33 km; 21 mi)
- Characteristic: Fl (4) W 20s.

The New Burnett Heads Light, also known as South Head Light, is an active lighthouse standing on the south side of the Burnett River entrance, in Burnett Heads, Queensland, Australia. In 1971 it replaced the Old Burnett Heads Light, which was relocated inland.

== History ==
The Old Burnett Heads Light stood on the south side of the Burnett River entrance between 1873 and 1971, when it was replaced with this tower. The new lighthouse was the fourth of a group of seven concrete towers erected by the Commonwealth between 1964 and 1979, by order of construction, Cape Capricorn Light, New Caloundra Light, Point Danger Light, itself, Fitzroy Island Light, Point Cartwright Light and Archer Point Light. The tower is made of concrete and covered with tiles, in the "swimming pool" style, much like Point Cartwright Light and Fitzroy Island Light. The concrete base of the old lighthouse is still present next to the new tower. The lighthouse also carries a Cospas-Sarsat receiver, one of a pair in Australia, the second being at Cave Point Light, Western Australia.

== Light specifications ==
The light characteristic shown is four white flashes every twenty seconds Fl.(4)W. 20s, only visible in the sector 120°-320°. The light source is a 12 Volt 50 Watt tungsten-halogen lamp, fed from the Mains electricity, providing a light intensity of 55,000 cd, visible for 18 nautical miles (33 km; 21 mi).

== Site operation and visiting ==
The site and the lighthouse are managed by the Australian Maritime Safety Authority. The site is open, but the tower is closed to the public.

== See also ==
- List of lighthouses in Australia
