= New Caloundra Light =

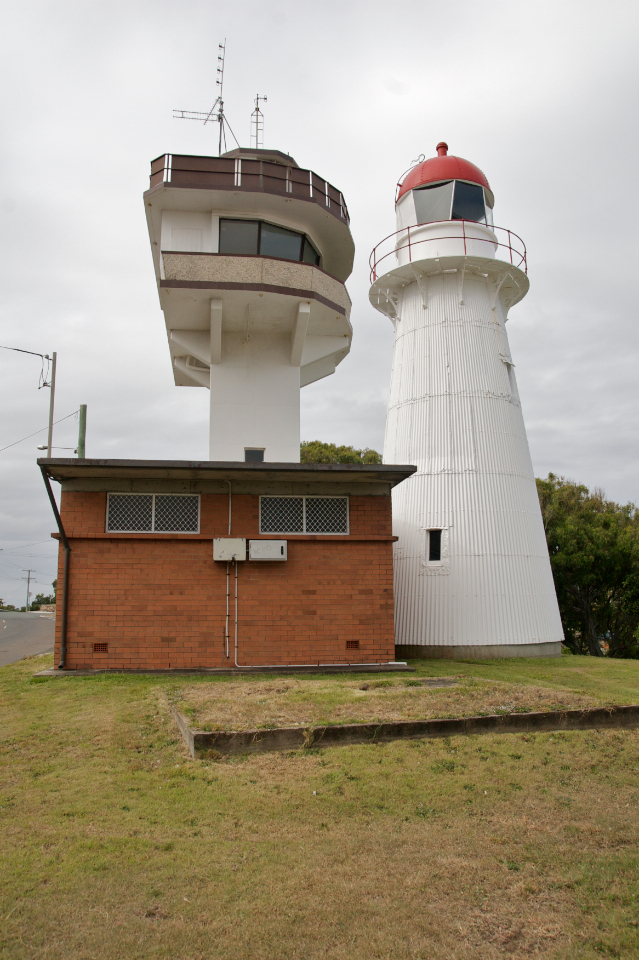
- Old Caloundra Light on the right, New Caloundra Light on the left, 2008
- Location: Caloundra; Queensland; Australia
- Coordinates: 26°48′05.63″S 153°08′14.67″E

Tower
- Constructed: 1967
- Construction: concrete tower
- Automated: 1968
- Height: 46 feet (14 m)
- Shape: square tower supporting D-shaped observation room, lantern on roof
- Markings: white tower
- Heritage: listed on the Queensland Heritage Register

Light
- First lit: 1968
- Deactivated: 1992
- Focal height: 52 metres (171 ft)
- Range: 24 nautical miles (44 km; 28 mi)
- Characteristic: Fl (2) W 10s.

New Caloundra Light, also known as New Caloundra Head Light, is an inactive lighthouse located in Caloundra on the Sunshine Coast in South East Queensland, Australia. It stands on Canberra Terrace near downtown Caloundra. The lighthouse was active from 1968 to 1992. It has a unique design resembling an airport control tower, the only surviving example of a lighthouse of this design in Australia.

== History ==
Old Caloundra Light had stood on Canberra Terrace since its construction in 1896, marking the entrance to the North West Channel, a deep water channel into Moreton Bay and the Port of Brisbane. Changes in the shipping industry in the 1960s caused an increase in large container ships, which made the channel even more important. In May 1966 permission was granted for the construction of a modern structure comprising a combined lighthouse, signal station and radar station.

The New Caloundra Light was erected in 1967, and was the second of a group of seven concrete towers erected between 1964 and 1979. By order of construction the lights were Cape Capricorn Light, New Caloundra Light, Point Danger Light, New Burnett Heads Light, Fitzroy Island Light, Point Cartwright Light and Archer Point Light.

The light source was two stacks of sealed beam lamps, installed on a revolving table. It had red and green sectors. While the light itself was fully automatic, the station was staffed due to the signal station. Four houses were constructed outside the station to accommodate the staff.

The tower was constructed right next to the old lighthouse. By 1968 it became fully operational and the old lighthouse was deactivated. In 1970 the old lighthouse was relocated to avoid demolition.

The lighthouse had a short lifespan as a coastal light. By 1978 the buildings in Caloundra had grown in height, obscuring it from some angles. In 1978 Point Cartwright Light was constructed, and the New Caloundra Light was downgraded to a harbour light. The harbour light remained there until 1992, when it was moved to Wickham Point, together with a radar/microwave link replacing the signal station, and the station was destaffed. New Caloundra Light remained as backup, until it was finally shut off in 1997.

The lighthouse's last display had a light characteristic of two white flashes every ten seconds (Fl.G(2).W. 10s). The light was a 1,000,000 cd, 200 Watt, sealed beam array fed from Mains electricity with a battery backup, visible for 24 nautical miles (44 km; 28 mi). It was displayed at a focal height of 52 metres (171 ft).

== Structure ==
The lighthouse structure, totaling 14 metres (46 ft) in height, is quite unique, resembling an airport control tower. It comprises a square tower carrying a semicircular D-shaped observation room, with the rounded side facing east, and a lantern room is mounted on the roof of the observation room. While a similar structure was constructed at Lytton Hill, in Lytton, Queensland, serving as an observation tower, it was demolished in the 1990s, leaving the New Caloundra Light as the only surviving example of this design.

The tower base measures 2.7 metres (8 ft 10 in). The entrance is from the western side, and a spiral concrete staircase leads to the observation room. The stairs have a steel tubular handrail, and circle a service duct. One rectangular window is set in each of the four sides of the base, aligned with the staircase. Cantilevered reinforced concrete beams angle from the base to support the floor of the observation room.

The observation room features windows on all sides. The eastern rounded side features a continuous band of windows, while the straight western side features four individual ones. The room includes an enclosed toilet in the northwest corner and central pillar with cavities linking to the roof level. A door in the southwest corner leads to a narrow balcony that wraps around the rounded part of the room. The balcony has a concrete floor and a balustrade covered in asbestos cement sheeting rendered with pebbledash on the exterior face. A steel ladder with safety grille on the northwest end leads to the flat roof.

The roof is surrounded with a balustrade with fibre cement panels. The concrete constructed lantern room is located at the centre of the roof. It is a circular room with a flat concrete roof, wider at the roof than at the base. Trapezoidal steel frame window panes are set on the eastern side, the side facing the sea. The lantern can be accessed via a door on the southwest. A ladder on the northwest allows access to the roof of the lantern room, where radar and radio equipment is mounted.

Another related structure is an orange brick generator shed just south of the lighthouse. It was built in 1967–1968 together with the lighthouse. Windows are set high on the wall, with a projecting brick window sill below. An overhanging concrete roof forms a narrow awning. Entrance to the structure is on the northern side. The inside is composed of two rooms, a larger generator room and a smaller room in the northwest with an internal door.

== Site operation and visiting ==
The site of the lighthouse is accessible, but the tower was originally closed to the public. In 2011, the Friends of the Caloundra Lighthouses applied for a license from the Sunshine Coast Regional Council to allow visits to the 1968 signal station and lighthouse. As of July 2012, the tower can be visited by contacting the Friends of the Caloundra Lighthouses.

== See also ==
- List of lighthouses in Australia
