= Fitzroy Island (Queensland) =

Island in Queensland, Australia

Native name: Koba or Gabar or Goong-Gan-Jee
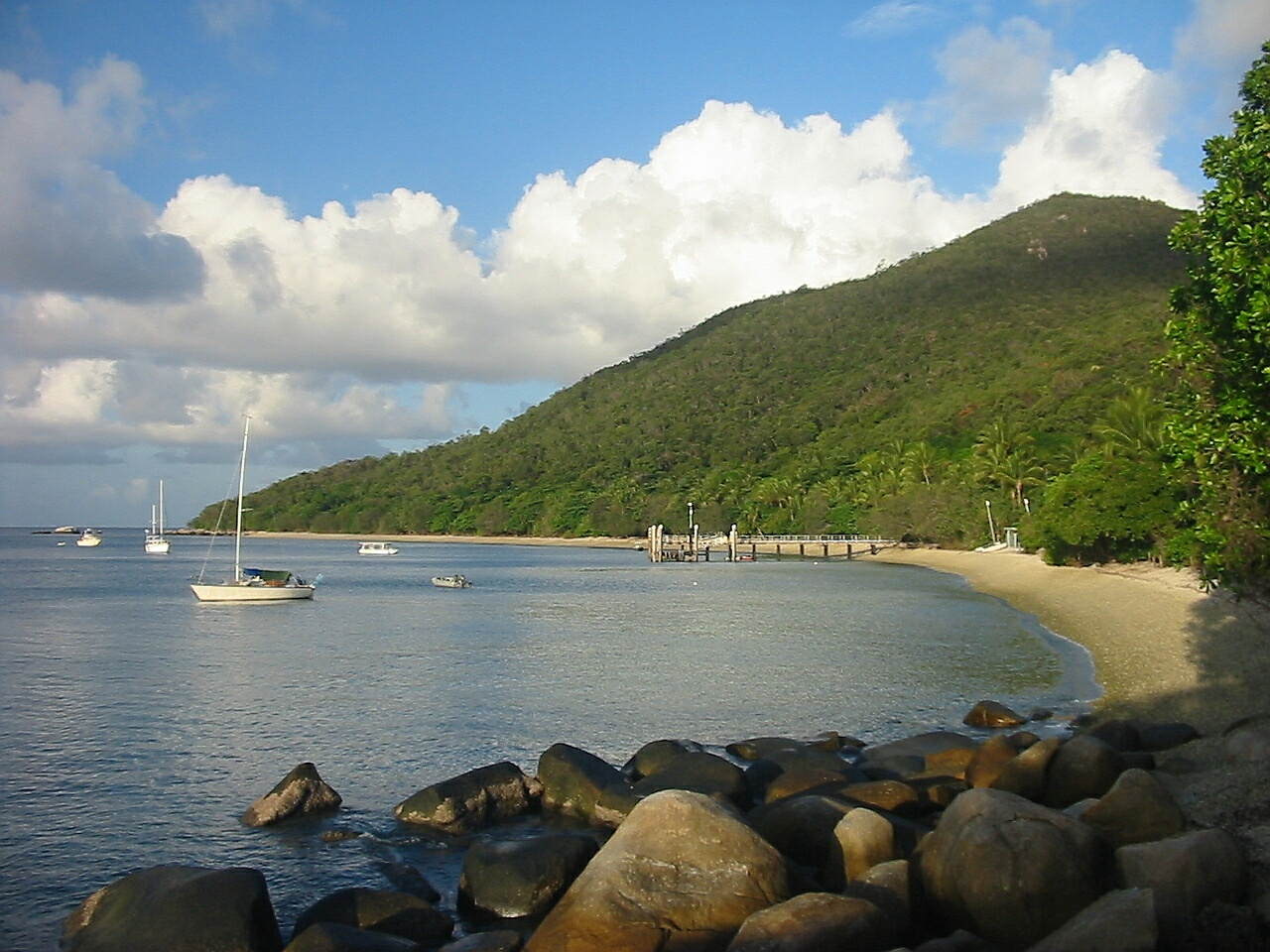
- Welcome Bay, Fitzroy Island
- Interactive map of Fitzroy Island

Geography
- Location: Coral Sea
- Coordinates: 16.9327°S 145.9947°E
- Area: 11.6 km^{2} (4.5 sq mi)
- Highest elevation: 240 m (790 ft)

Administration
- Australia
- State: Queensland
- LGA: Cairns Region

Demographics
- Population: 85 (2021)

Fitzroy Island Gabar or Goong-Gan-Jee Island
- Suburb
- Interactive map of Fitzroy Island
- Coordinates: 16.9302°S 145.9922°E
- Country: Australia
- State: Queensland
- City: Cairns
- LGA: Cairns Region

Government
  - State electorate: Mulgrave
  - Federal division: Kennedy

Area
  - Total: 11.6 km^{2} (4.5 sq mi)

Population
  - Total: 85 (2021 census)
  - Density: 7.33/km^{2} (18.98/sq mi)
- Time zone: UTC+10:00 (AEST)
- Postcode: 4871

Fitzroy Island (originally Koba or Gabar or Goong-Gan-Jee) is a continental island offshore from Cape Grafton, 29 km (18 miles) southeast of Cairns, Queensland, Australia. It is a locality in the Cairns Region. In the 2021 census, Fitzroy Island had a population of 85 people.

== Geography ==
Fitzroy Island is a large tropical island, with some rainforest covering and its own fringe coral reef system. The island has a total area of 11.6 square kilometres. The highest point of the island is 240 metres (790 feet) above sea level.

Fitzroy Island is a 45-minute ferry ride (about 30 km; 20 miles) from Cairns and is surrounded by a reef system that forms part of the Great Barrier Reef Marine Park. Nearly all of the continental island is protected within the Fitzroy Island National Park. Four walking tracks have been established to various parts of the island.

== Climate ==
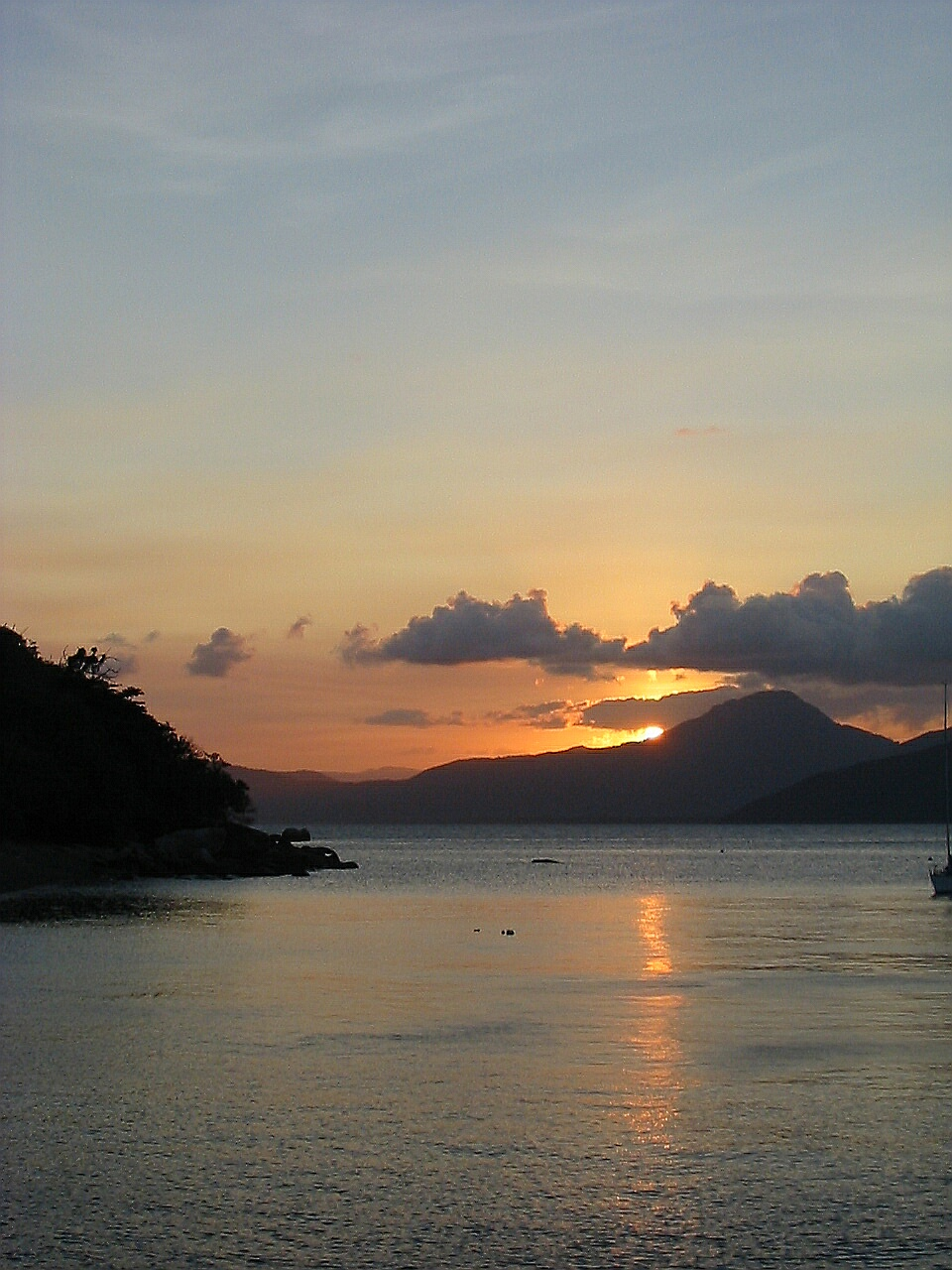
Sunset over Welcome Bay, Fitzroy Island

Fitzroy has a tropical monsoon climate (Köppen: Am) with a long, hot, wet season during the summer months, and a short, warm, relatively dry season during the winter months.

Climate data for Fitzroy Island Lighthouse (16º56'S, 146º00'E, 124 m AMSL) (1968-1991 normals and extremes)
Month	Jan	Feb	Mar	Apr	May	Jun	Jul	Aug	Sep	Oct	Nov	Dec	Year
Record high °C (°F)	36.1 (97.0)	35.6 (96.1)	35.9 (96.6)	33.3 (91.9)	30.0 (86.0)	28.9 (84.0)	30.0 (86.0)	29.6 (85.3)	31.6 (88.9)	32.9 (91.2)	34.0 (93.2)	39.9 (103.8)	39.9 (103.8)
Mean daily maximum °C (°F)	30.6 (87.1)	30.1 (86.2)	29.4 (84.9)	27.9 (82.2)	25.9 (78.6)	23.9 (75.0)	23.5 (74.3)	24.9 (76.8)	26.8 (80.2)	28.8 (83.8)	30.1 (86.2)	30.7 (87.3)	27.7 (81.9)
Mean daily minimum °C (°F)	24.5 (76.1)	24.1 (75.4)	23.8 (74.8)	22.7 (72.9)	21.3 (70.3)	19.4 (66.9)	19.0 (66.2)	19.4 (66.9)	20.7 (69.3)	22.3 (72.1)	23.6 (74.5)	24.4 (75.9)	22.1 (71.8)
Record low °C (°F)	20.0 (68.0)	19.4 (66.9)	20.0 (68.0)	18.5 (65.3)	13.9 (57.0)	13.9 (57.0)	13.6 (56.5)	13.3 (55.9)	15.0 (59.0)	19.0 (66.2)	19.7 (67.5)	20.6 (69.1)	13.3 (55.9)
Average precipitation mm (inches)	480.1 (18.90)	477.5 (18.80)	486.7 (19.16)	303.1 (11.93)	225.5 (8.88)	124.1 (4.89)	74.2 (2.92)	72.1 (2.84)	44.8 (1.76)	46.6 (1.83)	114.7 (4.52)	214.4 (8.44)	2,664.4 (104.90)
Average precipitation days (≥ 1.0 mm)	14.9	16.9	18.4	17.3	15.6	10.2	9.5	7.6	6.3	5.8	7.6	11.2	141.3
Average afternoon relative humidity (%)	75	78	78	79	80	77	77	73	69	68	69	72	75
Average dew point °C (°F)	24.2 (75.6)	24.4 (75.9)	23.8 (74.8)	22.4 (72.3)	20.7 (69.3)	18.1 (64.6)	17.9 (64.2)	18.2 (64.8)	19.1 (66.4)	20.7 (69.3)	22.1 (71.8)	23.5 (74.3)	21.3 (70.3)
Source: Bureau of Meteorology

== History ==
The island separated from the mainland about 8000 years ago, at the end of the last ice age. There were Aboriginal visits, mainly for visiting hunting trips and recreation. The Yidiny people named the island "Gabar", meaning "lower arm", because of how it was partially submerged.

Lieutenant James Cook named the island in 1770 after Augustus Henry Fitzroy. The island was used for a considerable time as a significant Chinese quarantine station for the Queensland goldfields. Subsequently, it was used as a mission school and, during World War II, as a coast watch station.

The island has also been a significant lighthouse base, with the last permanent lighthouse structure on the main island still being an important attraction. Since the lighthouse closed, the marine community has been served by an automatic lighthouse, based on the adjacent Little Fitzroy Island. There has been both a giant clam farm at Welcome Bay, and there is now a tourist resort and day visitor centre.

== Demographics ==
In the 2016 census, Fitzroy Island had a population of 44 people.

In the 2021 census, Fitzroy Island had a population of 85 people.

== Education ==
There are no schools on Fitzroy Island, nor nearby. The alternatives are distance education and boarding school.

== Attractions ==
The island is home to a 101-room resort with a restaurant, pool, swim up bar as well as a dive / activity centre. Originally opened in 1981, property developer Doug Gamble bought and renovated the resort in 2010. Island visitors can also spend time at Foxy's Bar and Cafe, a large Pacific Islands bar with a 70’s structural theming, situated right on the beach front, about 100 metres from the resort buildings. The resort manages the camping area.

== See also ==
- List of islands of Australia
