= Cape Capricorn =

Cape in Queensland, Australia

Coordinates: 23°28′53″S 151°13′53″E

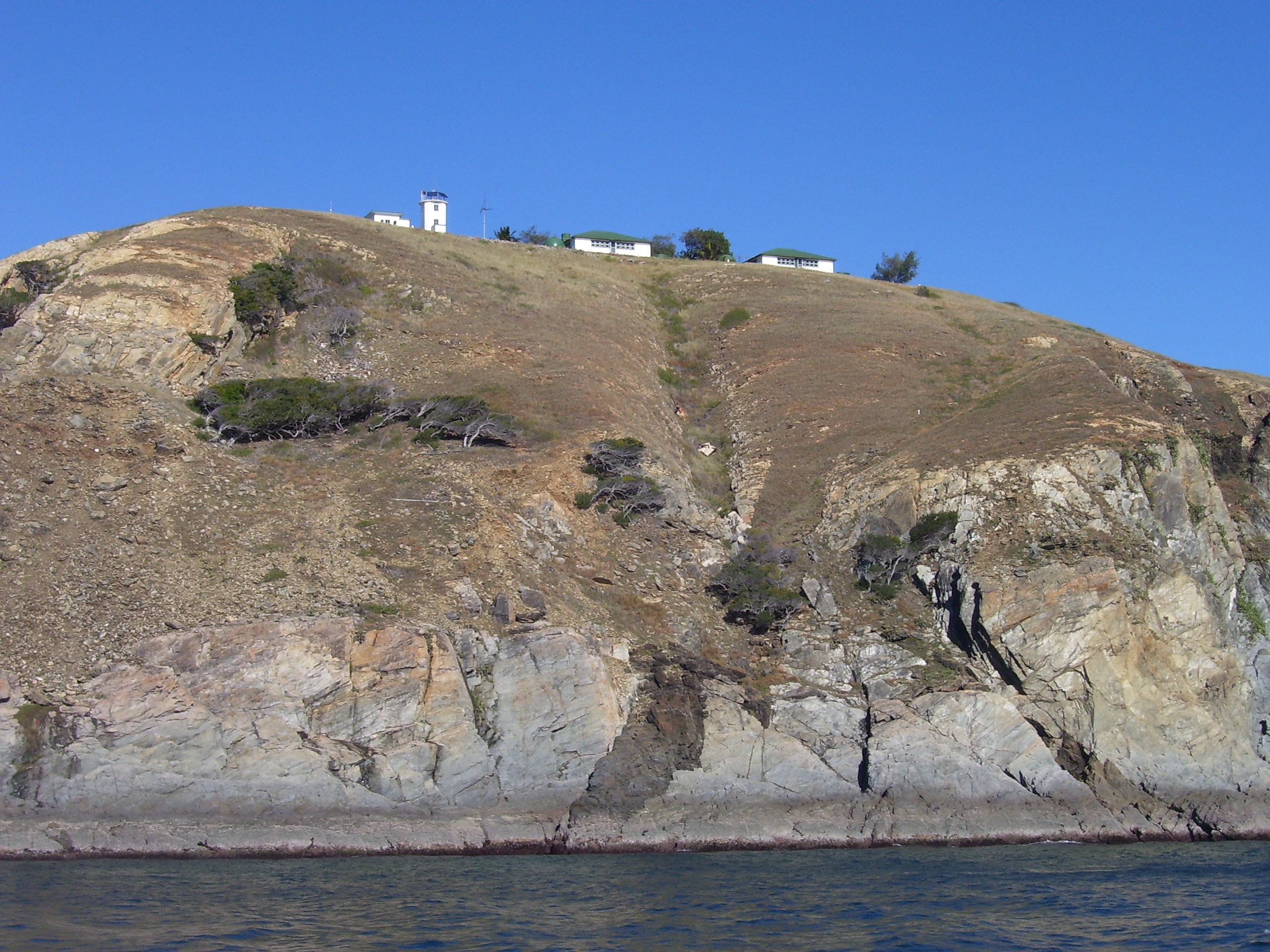
Cape Capricorn Light, 2007

Cape Capricorn is a coastal headland on Curtis Island, Gladstone Region, Queensland, Australia.

It was named by Captain Cook on 25 May 1770, since he found it to be located on the Tropic of Capricorn (which was located at 23°28′15″ in 1770). The modern surveyed location of its endpoint is just slightly south of the present tropic.

== Heritage listings ==
Cape Capricorn has a number of heritage-listed sites, including:

- Cape Capricorn Light, North eastern tip of Curtis Island

== Lighthouse ==
A lighthouse was first established on the Cape in 1875. The current lighthouse, dating from 1964, is the third built on the site. The lighthouse, like most along the Queensland coast, is automated.

== View ==
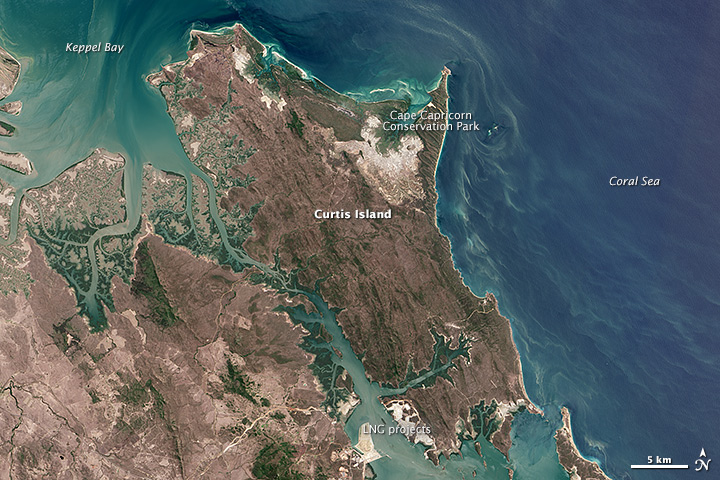
Curtis Island
