= Cleveland Point Light =

Lighthouse in Australia

Cleveland Point Light (original)
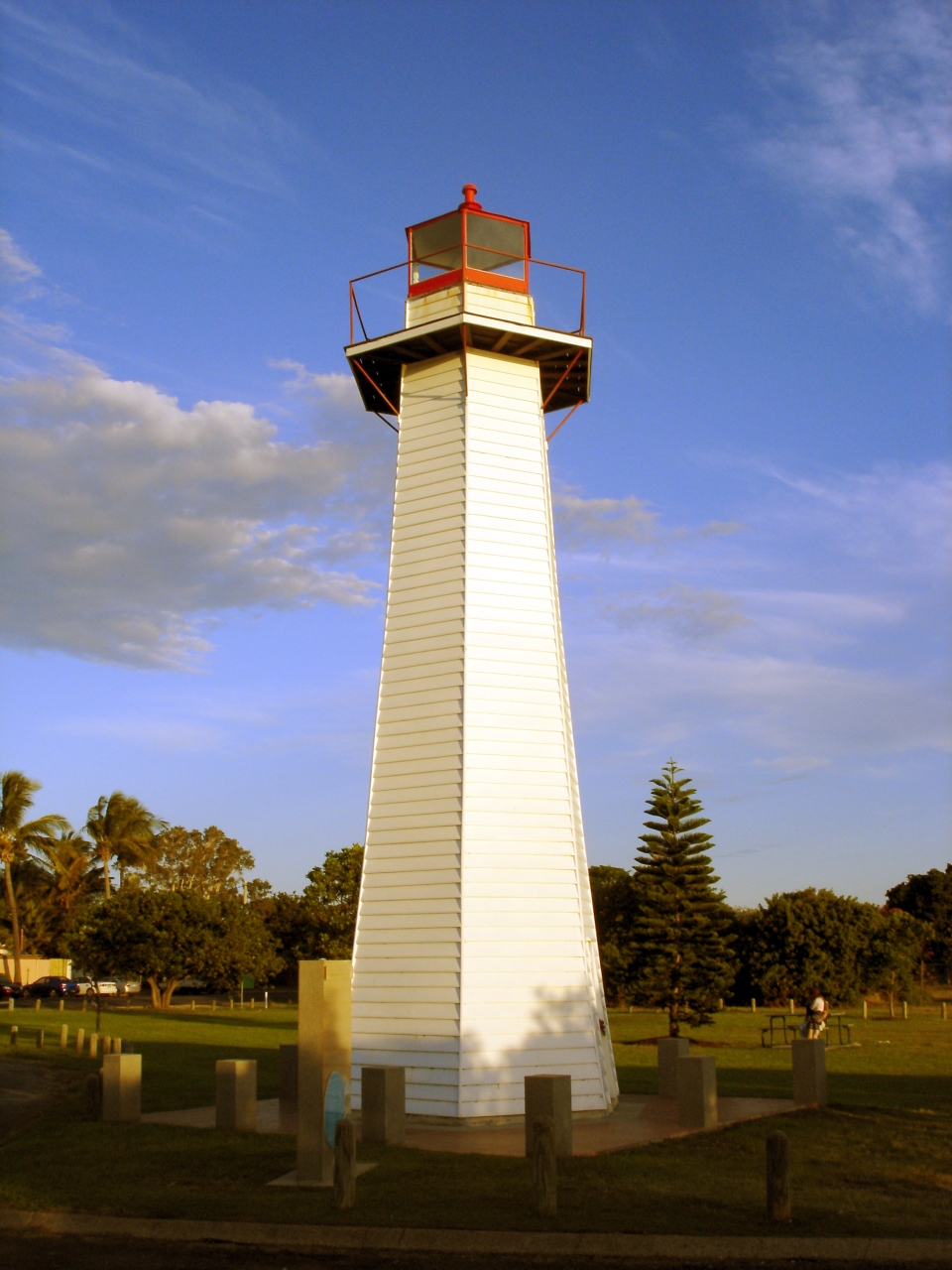
- The old Cleveland Point Light, 2006
- Location: Cleveland; Queensland; Australia
- Coordinates: 27°30′37″S 153°17′21″E

Tower
- Constructed: 1864-1865
- Construction: timber frame clad with weatherboards
- Height: 38 feet (12 m)
- Shape: tapered hexagonal tower with gallery and lantern
- Markings: white tower, red lantern
- Heritage: listed on the Queensland Heritage Register

Light
- First lit: 1865
- Deactivated: 1976

Cleveland Point Light, also known as Point Cleveland Light, is a lighthouse located on the north-eastern tip of Cleveland Point, at Cleveland, Redland City, Queensland, Australia. It overlooks Moreton Bay to the east and Raby Bay to the west. The old lighthouse was established in 1864–1865 as a wooden hexagonal tower. It is one of only two surviving lighthouses of this form, the other being Old Burnett Heads Light. A newer light, constructed of a concrete post, replaced it in 1976, and the old lighthouse was relocated a short distance away, where it stands today. The newer light was removed in 2009.

An early 1847 private beacon was replaced by a temporary government light in 1864, and then the permanent tower in 1865. The lens was upgraded twice, in 1874 and 1879. In 1934 the lighthouse was converted to electricity, and remained so until 1976 when it was deactivated and replaced by a concrete pile light constructed just 3 metres (9.8 ft) away. The original tower was moved away in 1979 and restored in 1987.

While timber frame and cladding construction is typical for the area and period, both the hexagonal form and the weatherboard cladding are unique. The tower is surmounted with a red painted lantern room and a hexagonal gallery. Both towers were easily accessible. The newer tower consisted of concrete posts supported by two vertical concrete bars. The old tower is easily accessible to the public as was the newer one, but entering is not allowed.

== Original lighthouse ==
=== History ===
The first navigation aid on Cleveland Point was a beacon established in 1847, by Francis Edward Bigge, Member of the Legislative Assembly of New South Wales, at his expense, as part of his lobbying of Cleveland as the port for Moreton Bay. In the middle of the 19th century, small coastal steamboats became a main means of transport for farmers in Moreton Bay, specifically in Cleveland, Victoria Point, Redland Bay and along the Logan River and Albert River. Several lights were established around that period to assist navigation in Moreton Bay, notorious for its rocks and moving mudflats and sandbanks. In some places where no official light was established, locals would install their own lights, as was the case in Cleveland Point. In the 1860s the Government of Queensland decided to replace these lights with a permanent light. The first temporary government light was displayed in April 1864. The permanent light was constructed in late 1864 to early 1865. The original light source was a fixed kerosene operated light, visible for 14.5 kilometres (7.8 nmi). In 1874 a refurbished Chance Brothers Fresnel lens from Comboyuro Point Light on Moreton Island replaced the original lens. The apparatus was upgraded to a more powerful Chance Brothers lens in 1879. Two red sectors, indicating close by shoals were installed in 1920. In 1934 the lighthouse was converted to electricity and the City Electric Light Company Limited became the responsible operator. The light source was a round concentrated filament lamp.

In 1969 the lighthouse took part in experiment in the use of laser beams as aid to navigation. In 1976 the lighthouse was deactivated and replaced by a concrete pile light which was constructed just 3 metres (9.8 ft) away. In March 1976 the original lighthouse was moved away about 30 metres (98 ft) away. The Redland Shire Council restored the lighthouse in 1987.

==== Notable light keepers ====
The first lighthouse keeper was Alfred Winship, who served from 1864 to 1877. The second keeper was James Troy, who served along with his family for 50 years until 1927, the longest-serving lightkeeper at one lighthouse in Australia. From 1927 to 1951 the keeper was Charles Klemm. Other keepers served for shorter periods after that.

=== Structure ===
The white painted tapering tower is timber framed, as typical for Queensland lighthouses of the late 19th century. However, it is quite unusual in that it is hexagonal in form, rather than round in form like most lighthouses of the period, and clad with weatherboards, rather than the typical metal. While several other lighthouses of the period were clad this way, the only other surviving example is Old Burnett Heads Light. The inside of the tower is unpainted. It comprises three levels connected by a ladder. A timber floor opens to the west of the first floor, while two windows are at the first and second levels, on the eastern face.

On top of the tower is a red painted iron alloy lantern room capped with an iron alloy dome. It holds six panels, five clear glazed and one of red perspex. A hatch under the sill on the western face opens to the gallery. The gallery is wooden, hexagonal in form, with a pipe handrail, supported on metal struts.

== New lighthouse ==
Cleveland Point Light (newer)
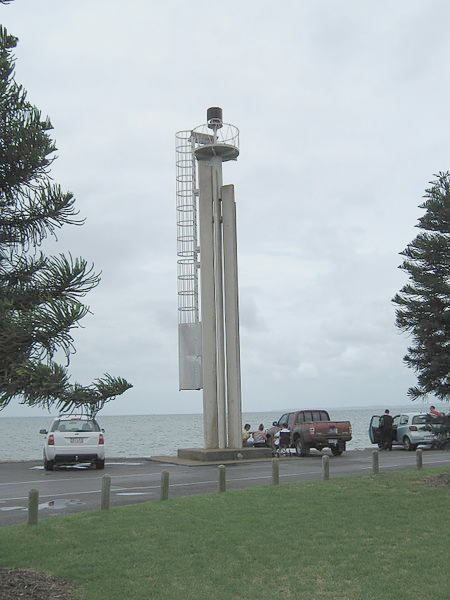
- The newer Cleveland Point Light, 2009
- Location: Cleveland, Queensland, Australia
- Coordinates: 27°30′34″S 153°17′20″E

Tower
- Constructed: 1976
- Foundation: concrete base
- Construction: concrete tower
- Height: 39 ft (12 m)
- Shape: post and two supporting vertical bars with balcony
- Markings: unpainted tower

Light
- Deactivated: 2009
- Focal height: 46 ft (14 m)
- Range: 13 nmi (24 km; 15 mi) (white), 13 nmi (24 km; 15 mi) (red)
- Characteristic: Fl WR 3s

The new lighthouse was established in 1976. It was an unpainted concrete post with a metal gallery, supported by two vertical concrete bars. It was located on the site of the original lighthouse. In 2009, the lighthouse was disassembled to fit a large prop boat for the filming of the 2010 film The Chronicles of Narnia: The Voyage of the Dawn Treader in its location. It was recommended for restoration in 2010, with ownership to transfer to Redland City Council as a tourist icon rather than for maritime safety purposes.

=== Display ===
The light characteristic of the newer light was a flash every three seconds, red or white depending on the sector (Fl.W.R. 3s). White flashes, visible for 13 nautical miles (24 km; 15 mi), are shown on 160°-225° and 285°-311°. Red flashes, visible for 8 nautical miles (15 km; 9.2 mi), are shown on 225°-285° and 311°-160°.

== Site operation and visiting ==
The site where the old lighthouse is located is managed by the Redland City Council and is accessible to the public, but its interior is closed. The 1879 Chance Brothers lens is on display at the Redland Shire Council chambers in Cleveland.

== See also ==
- List of lighthouses in Australia
