= Fitzroy Island National Park =

National park in Australia

- IUCN category II (national park)
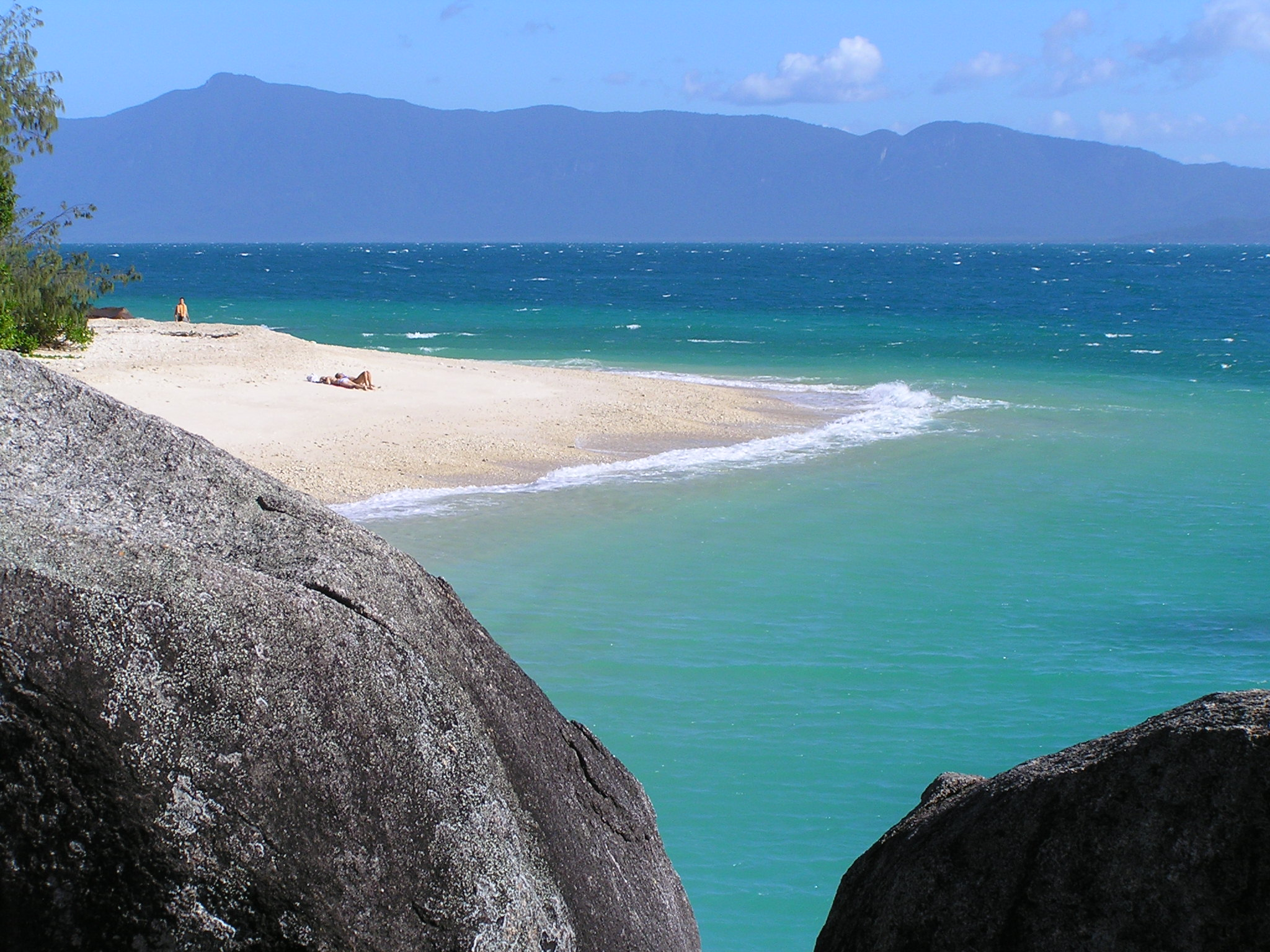
- Beach on Fitzroy Island

- Location within Queensland
- Location: Queensland
- Nearest city: Cairns
- Coordinates: 16°55′48″S 145°59′32″E
- Area: 3.24 km^{2} (1.25 sq mi)
- Established: 1939
- Governing body: Queensland Parks and Wildlife Service
- Website: Official website

Fitzroy Island National Park is a gazetted protected area covering Fitzroy Island, in Far North Queensland, Queensland, Australia. Fitzroy Island (also called Koba or Gabar) is a continental island located 22 kilometres (14 mi) east of Cairns on the mainland.

The Aboriginal people particularly connected to this Island are the Kobaburra (or alternatively Gaba:ra) from within the Gungganyji language group.

As a Queensland National Park the natural and cultural resources of the Island itself (down to high tide) are protected by the Nature Conservation Act 1992 and much of the island is therefore off-limits to visitors. Most visitors remain on the sheltered western side of the island, where the jetty, resort and best snorkeling can be found.

== Island ==
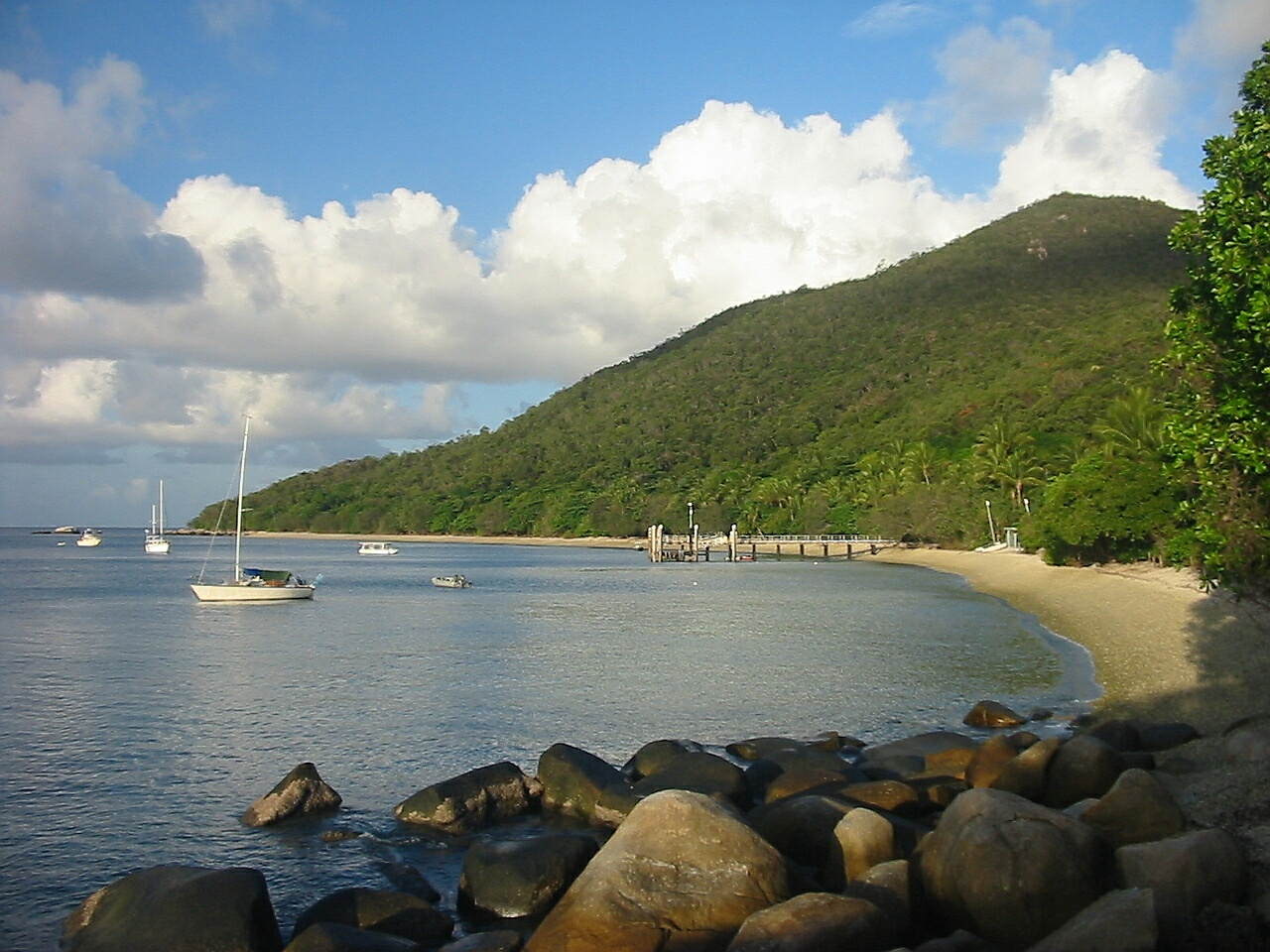
Welcome Bay, Fitzroy Island

Fitzroy Island is a continental island, not a coral cay. It became an island when sea levels rose at the end of the last ice age, flooding a plain between a hill that is now Fitzroy Island, and what is now Cape Grafton. Over the 10,000 years since that time, coral reefs have formed in the bay on the protected western side of the island, and lush rainforest on its shore.

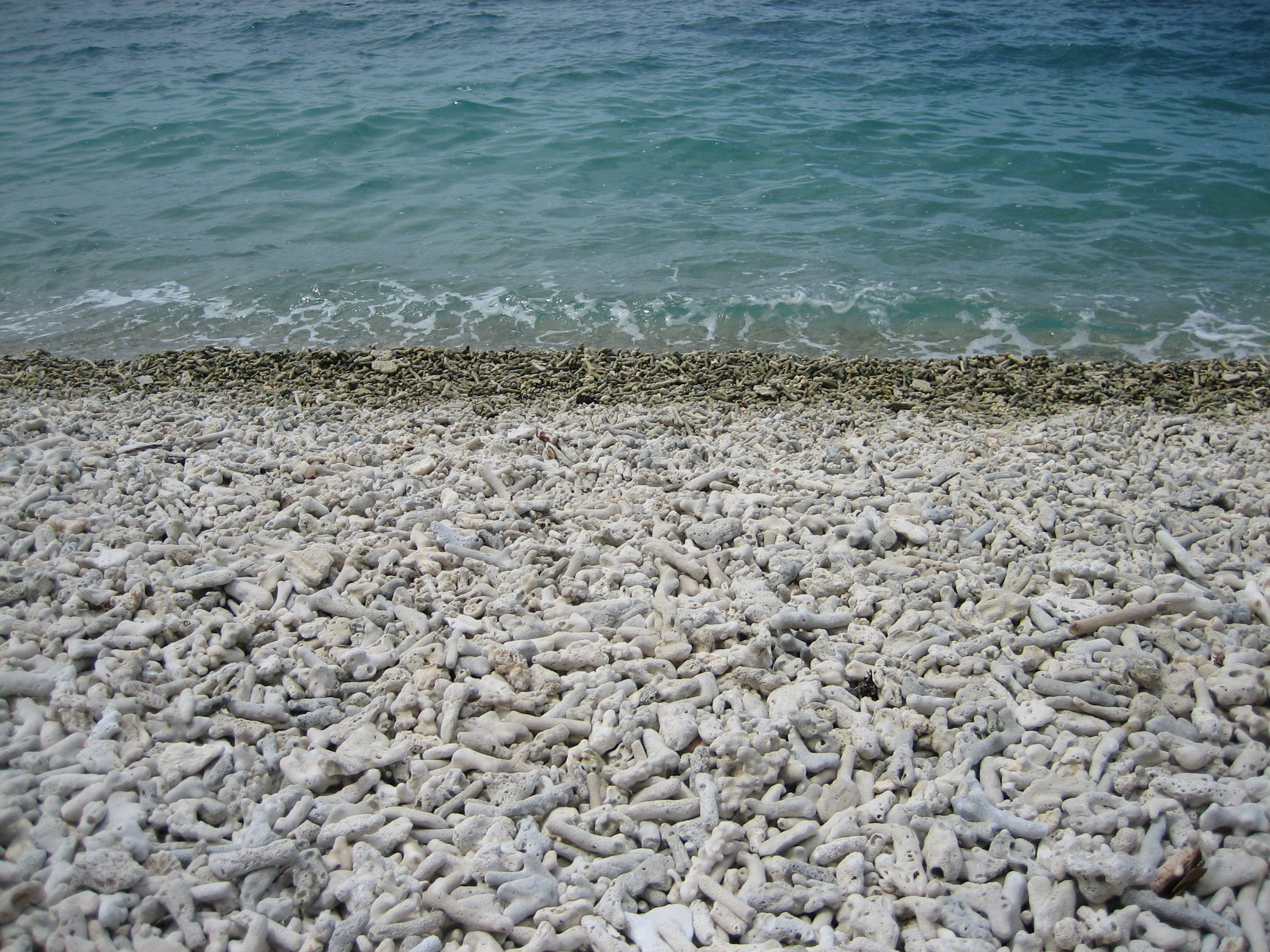
Coral Beach, Fitzroy Island

Fitzroy Island has been put to many uses by humankind. It is part of the traditional lands of the Gurabana Gungandji people, who recorded its formation in myth, and was used as a hunting and fishing ground. In 1778, Lieutenant James Cook named the island after the family name of the Duke of Grafton, who was the British Prime Minister when his ship, HMB Endeavour, had set sail. Through the 1800s, a pearling and beche-de-mer industry operated from the island. In 1876, a quarantine station was established on Fitzroy Island for Chinese "coolies" en route to the Palmer River Goldfields. A giant clam research station remains in operation on Welcome Bay. The Island has also served as part an aboriginal mission in the early 1900s, an artillery gun emplacement in World War II, and, more recently, a tourist resort.

The Island has also been home to lighthouses warning ships in the Grafton Passage of the reefs around the island, and a small automatic light on Little Fitzroy Island, just off the north-east point, still serves this purpose. An inactive lighthouse sits on the point above, and is part of the circuit trail that is open to tourists.

Fitzroy's isolation has resulted in a unique habitat, with few large mammals. The dominant predators on the island are reptiles; particularly pythons (brown and green), monitor lizards and the Major skink. The latter of these is particularly common and will be seen frequently as a tourist wanders around the trails. There are no venomous snakes on the island, though python bites can become infected.

== Recreation ==
=== Walking trails ===
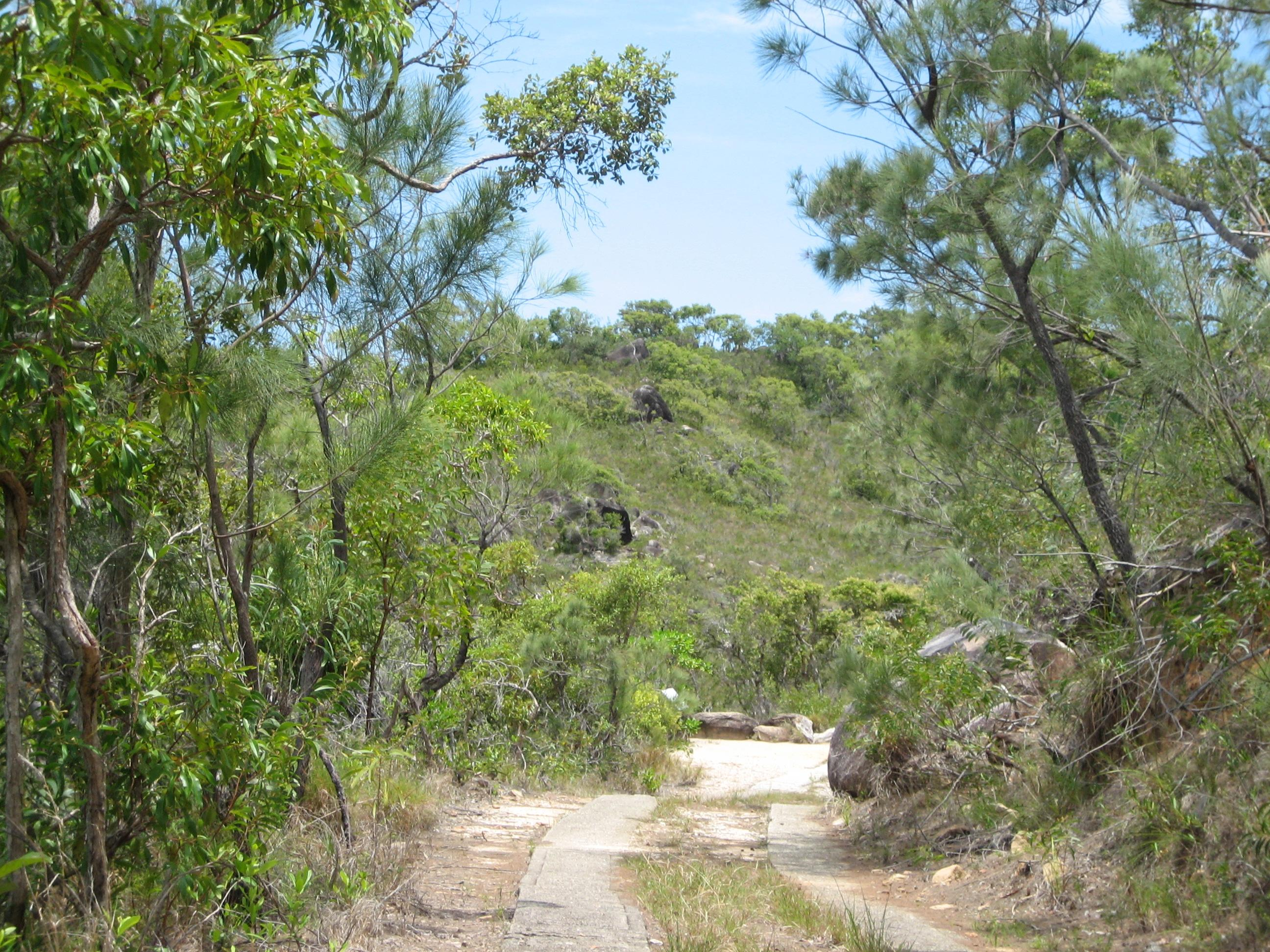
Walking Trail, Fitzroy Island

There is a walking track that takes in the northern end of the island, the lighthouse on the north-west point which overlooks Little Fitzroy Island, and the island's peak, which offers stunning 360 degree views over the surrounding reefs and Cape Grafton. From the top, on a clear day it is possible to make out the Frankland Islands to the south. The trail then drops back down to the resort.

Nudey Beach can be accessed by heading along the trail at the southern end of the resort, and leads along the edge of the island through rainforest, with occasional glimpses out to Cape Grafton, and then descends to Nudey Beach, which was once a nude bathing beach, with some coral available for snorkelers.

=== Snorkeling ===
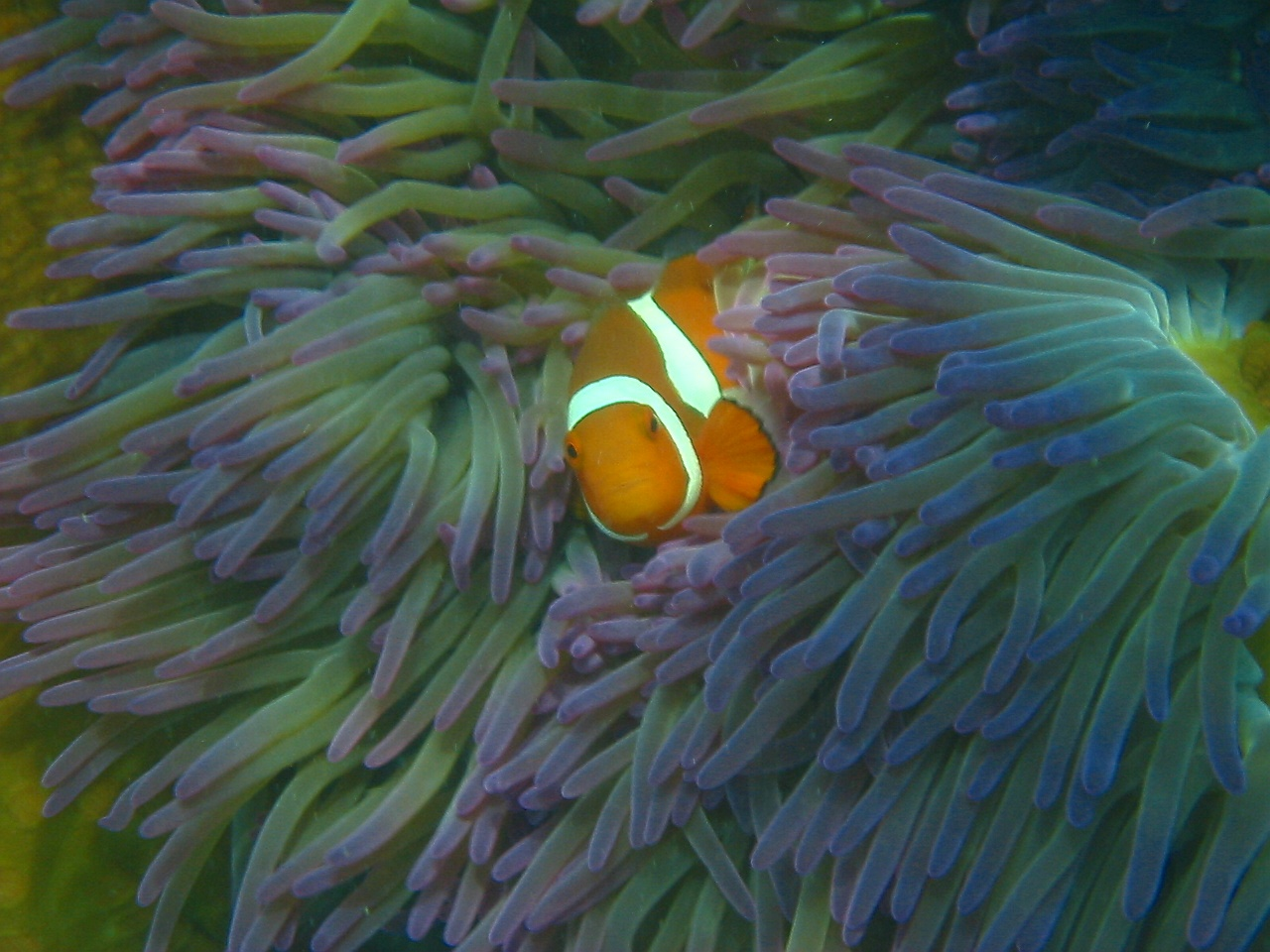
Clownfish at Welcome Bay, Fitzroy Island

The fringing reef is a fair distance from the shore at the northern end of Welcome Bay, where it starts at the quite prominent 'Bird Rock'. It runs almost all the way down to the jetty before there is a small gap where the boats come in. The reef starts again near the rocks at the southern end of the beach, and runs around the corner to Nudey Beach. Along this stretch it is extremely close to shore - literally just a few steps from the shore. The snorkelling at Fitzroy is greatly underrated. Visibility can be a bit low, especially after rough weather, but the coral is excellent and the variety of fish superb. The clownfish (Amphiprion percula) can be found, as well as other anemonefish. Parrotfish and wrasses are common, and green sea turtles regularly frequent the bay.

It is unlikely that box jellyfish would be encountered at Fitzroy Island due to the 4 km passage between the island and the mainland, but they have been found there occasionally, as well as other stinging jellyfish.

=== Resort ===
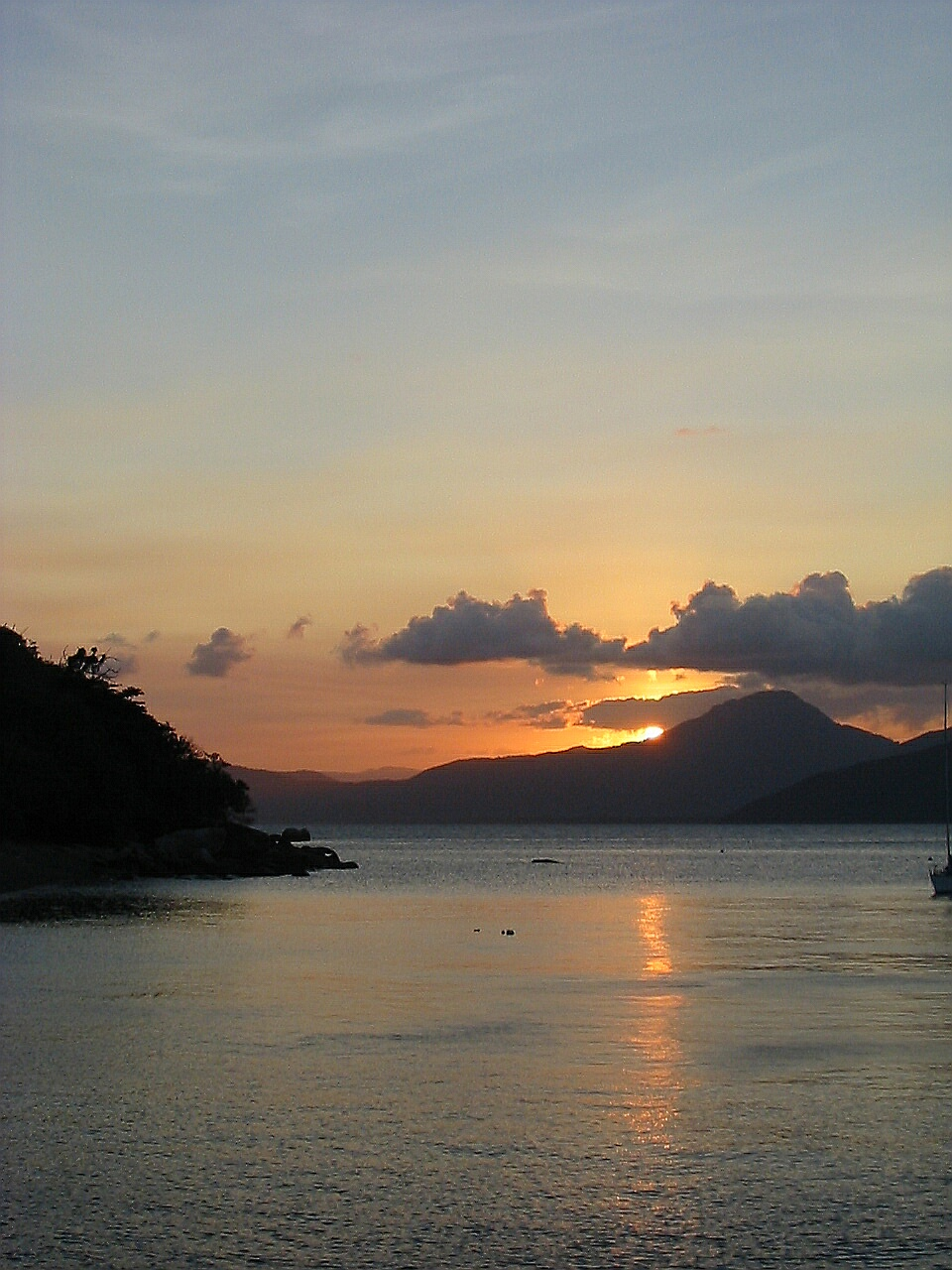
Sunset over Welcome Bay, Fitzroy Island

Fitzroy Island Resort can be found on Welcome Bay. Fitzroy Island Resort is a 60-minute ferry ride (about 30 km) from Cairns in Queensland and is surrounded by a reef system that forms part of the Great Barrier Reef Marine Park.

== See also ==
- Protected areas of Queensland
- Great Barrier Reef
