= Woody Island Lighthouses =

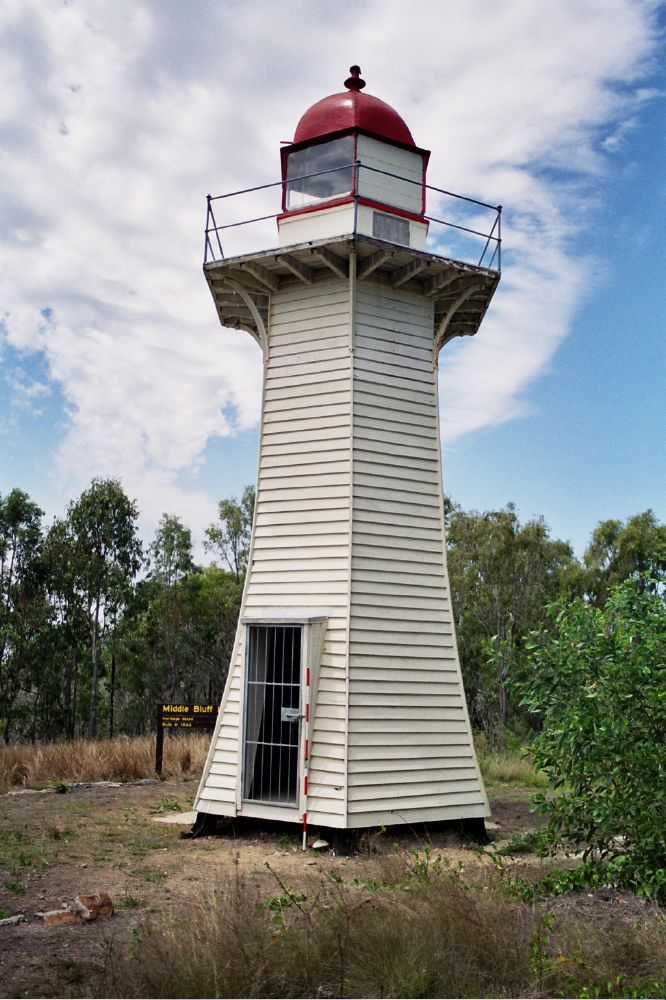
- Middle Bluff Lighthouse

- Location within Queensland Location within Australia
- 25.2991°S 152.9723°E
- Location: Big Woody Island in the Great Sandy Strait, Hervey Bay; Fraser Coast Region; Queensland; Australia

History
- Design period: 1840s–1860s (mid-19th century)
- Built: 1866–1870

Queensland Heritage Register
- Official name: Woody Island Lighthouses & Ancillary Building Site
- Type: state heritage (archaeological, built, landscape)
- Designated: 30 March 2001
- Reference no.: 602169
- Significant period: 1860s–1870s, 1930s, 1950s, 1980s (historical); 1866–ongoing (social)
- Significant components: lighthouse/light station, views to, burial/grave, headstone, views from, shed – storage

The Woody Island Lighthouses are a pair of heritage-listed lighthouses at Big Woody Island in the Great Sandy Strait, Hervey Bay, Fraser Coast Region, Queensland, Australia. They were built from 1866 to 1870. It was added to the Queensland Heritage Register on 30 March 2001.

== History ==
The twin timber lighthouses, and lightkeeper's residence at North Bluff, were constructed in 1866 to designs prepared by the Office of the Colonial Architect, Charles Tiffin. A second residence was constructed at Middle Bluff in 1868.

Up until 10 December 1859, the colony of New South Wales extended as far north as Cape York Peninsula. In 1859, the new colony of Queensland acquired over 5,000 kilometres (3,100 mi) of coastline which had few safety features in place, and became responsible for all navigation lights and harbours along this coastline. At the time the only lighthouse which existed was Cape Moreton Light at Cape Moreton by the New South Wales Government in 1857.

By 1859, Maryborough, first settled in 1847, was already operating as a port of some importance. The main export was wool from the inland areas. Migrant ships were also coming into Maryborough. Ships coming into Maryborough had to enter through Hervey Bay, an area full of sandbanks, on which ships could easily become stranded. A channel, with a minimum of over five metres of water at low tide, ran down the middle of the Bay, past the east of Woody Island, along Fraser Island and into the Mary River.

In 1862, the Queensland government had appointed a Portmaster, Commander George Poynter Heath and had passed the Marine Board Act 1862. GP Heath (1830–1921) was born at Hanworth, in Norfolk, England. Late in 1859 as a lieutenant, he applied for the government post of marine surveyor in the new colony of Queensland and was appointed. In his thirty-three tenure of office in what became the sub-department of harbours, lighthouses and pilots, Heath was responsible for supervising the opening of 13 new ports, establishing 33 lighthouses, 6 lightships and 150 small lights and marking the inner route of the Great Barrier Reef. In November 1887 he retired from public service because of ill health and later returned to England.

In the two years following the establishment of the Marine Board Act 1862, due to a lack of funds to spend on marine safety, activity concentrated on dealing with pilots and harbour lights, The issue of coastal lights was not taken up until 25 May 1864, when Members of the Queensland Legislative Assembly moved that a Select Committee be appointed to inquiry into and report upon the state of the harbours and rivers in the colony. The Committee consisted of Messrs Arthur Macalister, John Douglas, Gordon Sandeman, Robert Cribb, Henry Challinor and Joshua Peter Bell and convened for the first time on 27 May 1864. The Committee widened the terms of reference to include the question of the necessity of additional lighthouses on the coast of Australia, within the colony of Queensland.

In a "Notice to Mariners" in the Queensland Government Gazette, in 1865, mention was made of the Burrum River which formed part of Hervey Bay, and that, when property beaconed and buoyed, the river would be easy steamers and small craft to navigate. In the same year, orders were sent for two lights for Hervey's Bay, as Hervey Bay was then known. Towers for fourth order, fixed (non-flashing) lights on Woody Island were completed by contract in 1866 and the lanterns were placed and fixed by the pilot's boat crew in 1867. Bringing the lenses and holophotes down from Maryborough and getting them up into the lanterns and finally adjusting them, took around ten days.

A call for tenders for the construction of lighthouses and a lightkeeper's cottage on Woody Island was advertised in the Maryborough Chronicle on 26 May 1866. Plans and specifications for the buildings were available in the Harbor Office in Maryborough. It is likely that the design for the lighthouses and the original lightkeeper's cottage at North Bluff was prepared by the Office of the Colonial Architect, Charles Tiffin. The Office prepared the specifications for the cottage at Middle Bluff two years later (1868). The plans were likely to have been overseen by Robert Ferguson. Ferguson was employed by Tiffin as a temporary foreman of works from 1864 to 1870, where, in 1867, wrote specifications for and oversaw construction of the lighthouses at Bustard Head and Sandy Cape.

John Simpson was appointed as the first lightkeeper of Woody Island and the lighthouses became operational on 1 October 1867. The two lights were considered as one unit, twin lights that lined up with each other. In the Government Gazette in 1867, Portmaster, GP Heath described how the lights operated together in order to guide vessels through Hervey Bay:

When entering Hervey's Bay, steer so as to pass one or two miles of the Fairway Buoy, until the two lights on Woody Island are visible, and a brought into line. Steer with the lights in one ...until the two lights are almost on the same level ... keep a look-out for the red buoy ... On sighting the buoy, steer ... [directions given] ... for the red buoy off the Woody Island Spit ... When the lights are seen to become red at the same time, a vessel is about one-third of distance from the spit across the channel ... From thence, steer to pass ... as usual ... until the high light [Middle Bluff light] is obscured ... Steer SSW until the light again opens out as a bright light ... from which a course must be ... shaped for the river heads..

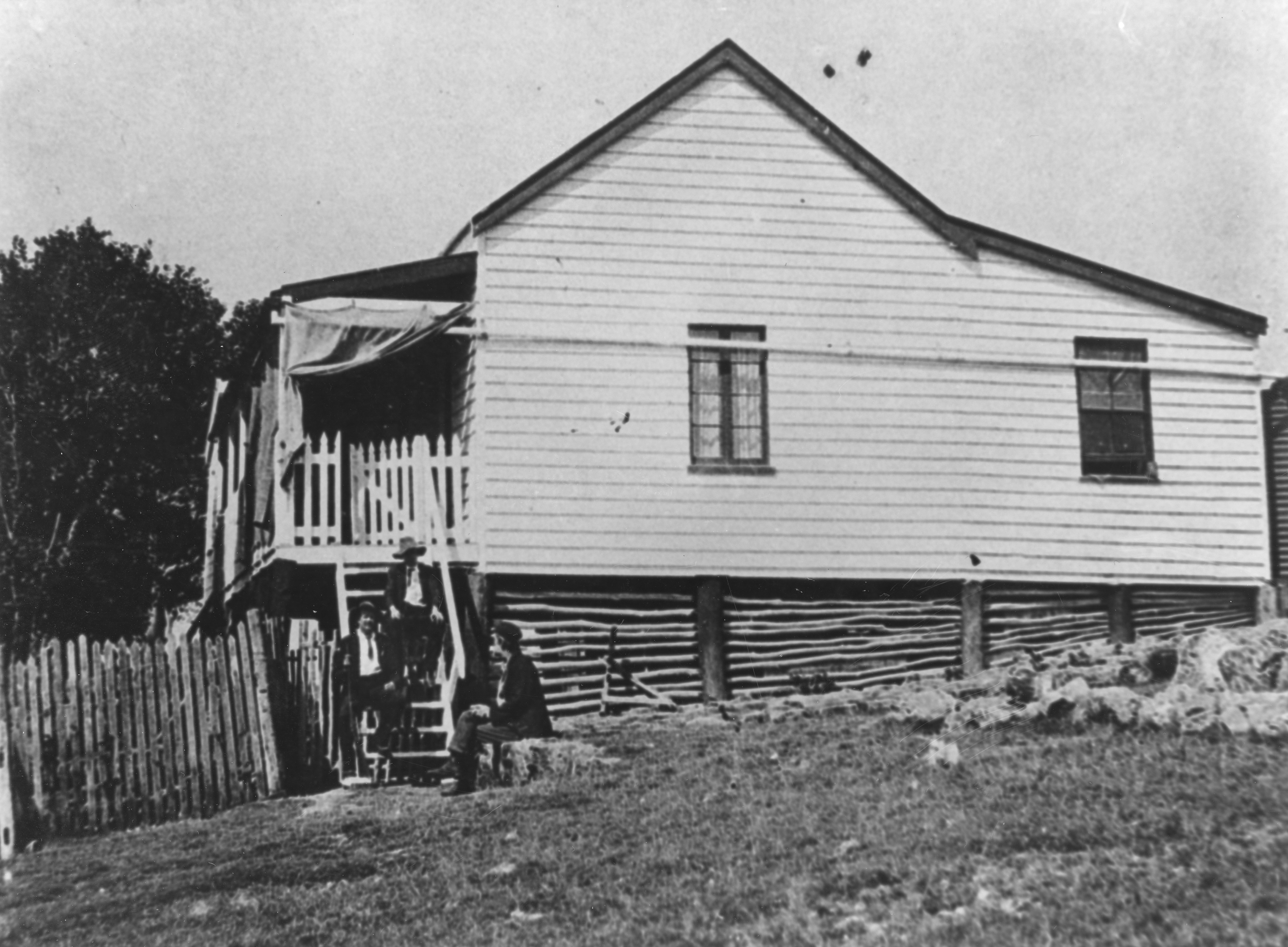
One of the lighthouse keepers' homes on Woody Island, circa 1906

Initially, a keeper's house was built at North Bluff. The main light was positioned south at Middle Bluff, however, keeper's quarters were not constructed at Middle Bluff until 1868. Both lights had signal masts and a storage shed was built on the beach at Middle Bluff, on the eastern side of the island, to store kerosene for the lighthouse along with other provisions.

The lamps and burners were the first of that size and description ever constructed for petroleum oil, and burnt with great certainty and less variation of flame than other petroleum burners. The Portmaster was concerned, however, as to whether he was justified in having only one lightkeeper on the island, considering its nearness to Fraser Island. The lights were two nautical miles apart, over a bad road, and the keeper, while at one light, left his family unprotected near the other lighthouse. Also, in the case of sudden illness, there was no person able to light the distant light, which might have led to very serious results.

The issue regarding the safety of the lightkeeper and his family was resolved in 1868, when an assistant lightkeeper was stationed at the upper lighthouse (North Bluff) and a house built nearby. The contract for the cottage for the assistant lightkeeper went to Messrs Pawson and Humberstone for £127, and was built from drawings and specifications prepared by the Office of the Colonial Architect, Charles Tiffin. The telegraph line was completed to Woody Island about 1870, thus allowing the lightkeeper at the lower lights to communicate the approach of vessels from the northward, and the assistant, the approach of those from the southward.

The Portmaster proposed a line of telegraph between Woody Island and Maryborough, not only on account of any accident which might happen to the lights or lightkeeper, and as an instalment of the line which must eventually be carried on to Sandy Cape when the lighthouse was established there, but as a consequence to vessels arriving in Hervey Bay, or passing through the Great Sandy Strait, and wishing to communicate with Maryborough or any other station without going the thirty miles up the river and back again unnecessarily.

In 1870, the telegraph line was established and Woody Island was connected to the mainland and Maryborough. The line crossed underwater from Urangan and was carried on iron poles imported from England up to the Middle Bluff lighthouse. In 1903, the telegraph line was connected to the Sandy Cape Lightstation from the Middle Bluff light. The line was carried on iron poles down to the eastern shore of the Island to a point known as Jefferies Beach, where the cable again went underwater to Fraser Island.

In 1871, Woody Island was listed as a reserve for the Queensland Acclimatisation Society. This reserve was in place until 1959. During their time of association on the Island, the Society introduced several pairs of rabbits in 1866. Rabbits remained on Woody Island until 1952 when myxomatosis was carried to the island via mosquitoes and the rabbit population was killed off. Also, in 1871, one of the lightkeepers, Mr Sheridan, introduced 200 coconut trees to Woody Island, of only one of which has survived.

The first lightkeeper, John Simpson, remained at Woody Island until 1870, when he was transferred to the Sandy Cape Lightstation. Simpson's replacement was Peter Hardie, lightkeeper, who remained on Woody Island until 1897. In 1883, Hardie's daughter, Sarah May Hardie, died of lung congestion and was buried south of North Bluff. It is thought that a number of other unmarked graves are located in the area.

During the period when the lighthouses were operational, Woody Island was predominantly cleared of vegetation, this enabled a clear view to the lights and the signal masts from the mainland. Today, regrowth covers much of Woody Island.

The North Bluff light was converted to an unwatched automatic light on 21 June 1937 running on gas. The keeper was no longer employed but remained in the house. The North Bluff Lighthouse was closed on 17 June 1959, at the same time, the Middle Bluff Lighthouse was automated, running on gas. In April 1960, Woody Island was gazetted as a national park. The gazettal of Little Woody Island as a national park followed in February 1977.

Following the automation of the Middle Bluff Lighthouse in 1959, the keepers' residences at Middle and North Bluff were demolished during the 1960s. In 1985, Middle Bluff Lighthouse was converted to solar power, only to be closed two years later in 1987.

Some maintenance and conservation work has been undertaken in the last few years by the Queensland Parks and Wildlife Service, particularly to the Middle Bluff Lighthouse. With reasonably easy access to Woody Island from nearby Hervey Bay, school and other tour groups are regular visitors to the island.

== Description ==
Woody Island Falls within the Great Sandy approximately five kilometres due east of Urangan, between Fraser Island and the mainland. The island has an area of about 660 hectares of undulating terrain and is approximately eleven kilometres long by three kilometres wide. The island is heavily timbered with hardwood species. A central ridge divides the island, rising to about 80 metres (260 ft) above sea level. The slope is easy on the landward or western side and falls steeply to seaward, culminating in an abrupt and discontinuous rocky escarpment towards the north which extends for about nine and a half kilometres. A small sandy beach is located towards the southern seaward point.

The ground cover consists of sparse native grasses on two old lighthouse clearings and dune flats, with very little cover through the higher and timbered areas. The two lighthouse clearings are located at Middle Bluff and North Bluff. The lighthouses are no longer operational.

=== Middle Bluff Lighthouse and surrounding area ===
The Middle Bluff lighthouse is relatively intact. It has a hardwood timber frame clad with timber weatherboards. The lamp and prisms have been removed and the lamp room glass has been replaced with plastic. The second landing window has been replaced with an aluminium one, while the lower landing window has been removed and built over. A steel mesh grill has been installed in the lighthouse.

Internally, a timber ladder leads from the lower section to the upper section, or lamp room, of the lighthouse. A smaller opening then leads to the deck of the lighthouse. The timber deck and iron railings are intact and in good condition. The position where the light was placed in the lamp room is also evident.

The remains of the lightkeeper's residence are located a few metres to the north of the lighthouse. The residence was removed in the 1960s and the remains are predominantly timber boards. Some of the stone paving surrounding the keeper's residence is discernible to the east of the lighthouse, however, it is not particularly clear at ground level and is better viewed from the deck of the lighthouse.

=== North Bluff Lighthouse and surrounding area ===
The North Bluff lighthouse is in a more dilapidated state than the Middle Bluff light. Similar to the Middle Bluff lighthouse, the North Bluff light has a frame of timber hardwood. Much of the timber weatherboard cladding is coming away from the frame. Nothing remains of the lamp room. Most of the timber deck and iron railings are evident, particularly on the northern side of the lighthouse, though some of the railings have fallen to the ground. The lighthouse is surrounded by timber posts which were once part of a fence, constructed in the 1950s.

The timber remains of the assistant lightkeeper's residence are located about four hundred metres to the south of the North Bluff light. Unlike the paving at the Middle Bluff light, the stone paving surrounding the position where the residence was located at North Bluff is very clear. The square position of the house is evident and the remains of a wood-fired stove remain. Glass, ceramic and other items found by the various tour groups, particularly school groups, have been placed in a large mound on the stone paving.

About twenty metres to the south of the residence is a large mature tree near a brick-lined depression which housed toilet facilities.

=== Site of Signal Mast, North Bluff ===
The site of the Signal Mast is located to about 100 metres (330 ft) up a slight incline to the west of the former residence site. The site is defined by a circular rock-lined area with the remains of the Signal Mast in the middle. The signal mast is no longer extant with only a circular metal base with the remains of a coat of black pitch in situ.

=== Rock-lined Track ===
The remains of the track are extant at Middle Bluff, the track, however, is not particularly clear. Following the path north the North Bluff lighthouse, the track becomes clearer. At one point, the track disappears and reappears further along. The rock-lined track runs for approximately four kilometres, apart from the section (of around one kilometre) where it disappears.

=== Telegraph Line ===
The remains of the telegraph line include the first line [1870] which ran along the western side of Woody Island to the mainland at Urangan and on to Maryborough and the second line [1903] which ran along the eastern side from Jeffries Beach across to Fraser Island and the Sandy Cape Lightstation. The remains include the cast iron poles, some with cross arms and glass insulators still intact.

=== Graves Site ===
The grave of Sarah May Hardie is located on the eastern side of Woody Island south of the North Bluff light. It is a concrete headstone with the words "SACRED TO THE MEMORY OF SARAH MAY HARDIE WHO DEPARTED THIS LIFE AUG. 8 1883 AGED 19 YEARS "KEPT"," engraved on it. It is surrounded by a recently constructed painted, timber, picket fence. The remains of the original fence are located near the grave. The original fence posts are timber with decorative, chamfered tops.

A number of other unmarked graves are thought to be located in the same area as Sarah Hardie's grave. The exact location of these, however, is not clear. There are reputedly nine graves on Woody Island.

=== Gas Shed and Gas Pipeline ===
The kerosene shed is a single storey, timber-framed shed, with a gable roof clad with recent corrugated, galvanised iron, with a skillion roof extension. At the rear [western] elevation, the building has a small, copper [painted white] piping. This piping was laid underground and extended up the ridge to the Middle Bluff lighthouse. The copper pipeline is still extant and visible is some places along the track leading to the Middle Bluff lighthouse. The pipeline is surrounded by square, fibro sheeting.

== Heritage listing ==
The Woody Island Lighthouses were listed on the Queensland Heritage Register on 30 March 2001 having satisfied the following criteria.

The place is important in demonstrating the evolution or pattern of Queensland's history.

Constructed in 1866, while not forming part of the major lighthouses constructed along the Queensland coast from the late 1860s to 1890, the Woody Island Lighthouses are significant in demonstrating Queensland's history, occupying an integral part in understanding the establishment of maritime navigational aids along the Queensland coast, and reflects the growth and development of Queensland after its separation from New South Wales. The site survives as an important illustration of the early industrial development of Queensland, and of the settlement of the Maryborough/Hervey Bay in particular, and the geographical importance of the area for maritime and communication purposes.

The Woody Island Lighthouses and Ancillary Buildings Site is associated with Commander George Poynter Heath, the first Portmaster of Queensland (1862–1890), a significant figure in the development of the Queensland lighthouse service. Heath was responsible for supervising the opening of 13 new ports, establishing 33 lighthouses, 6 lightships and 150 small lights and marking the inner route through the Barrier Reef.

The place demonstrates rare, uncommon or endangered aspects of Queensland's cultural heritage.

The Woody Island lighthouses are further significant as rare examples of twin lighthouses constructed along the Queensland coast.

The place has potential to yield information that will contribute to an understanding of Queensland's history.

With further archaeological and historical research and analysis, the place has the potential to reveal important information about Queensland's history and early maritime technology and to reveal further information about infrastructure and other grave sites associated with the lightstation and with the history of Woody Island.

The place is important in demonstrating the principal characteristics of a particular class of cultural places.

Constructed using an octagonal, timber-framed tower clad with weatherboards, the Woody Island lighthouses are significant as early examples of this type of construction, typically found in Queensland. The use of timber framing (usually clad with iron) was even more frequent following the construction of the Lady Elliot Island Lighthouse in 1873.

The place is important because of its aesthetic significance.

The ambience of the lighthouses, including the ruins and the overgrown vegetation, combined with their positions on the Island, overlooking Hervey Bay, the Great Sandy Strait and neighbouring Fraser Island and Little Woody Island, contribute to the site's aesthetic appeal, which has attracted public interest and encouraged exploration for many years.

The place has a strong or special association with a particular community or cultural group for social, cultural or spiritual reasons.

For the Hervey Bay and Maryborough communities, the place has a strong association with their heritage.

The Woody Island Lighthouses are especially significant for its strong association with the life of the lightkeepers, their families and maintenance and stores people, who contributed to the continuum of a system dedicated to the single aim of maintaining the navigational aids for a period of nearly 120 years.
