= Cowan Cowan Point Light =

Lighthouse in Queensland, Australia

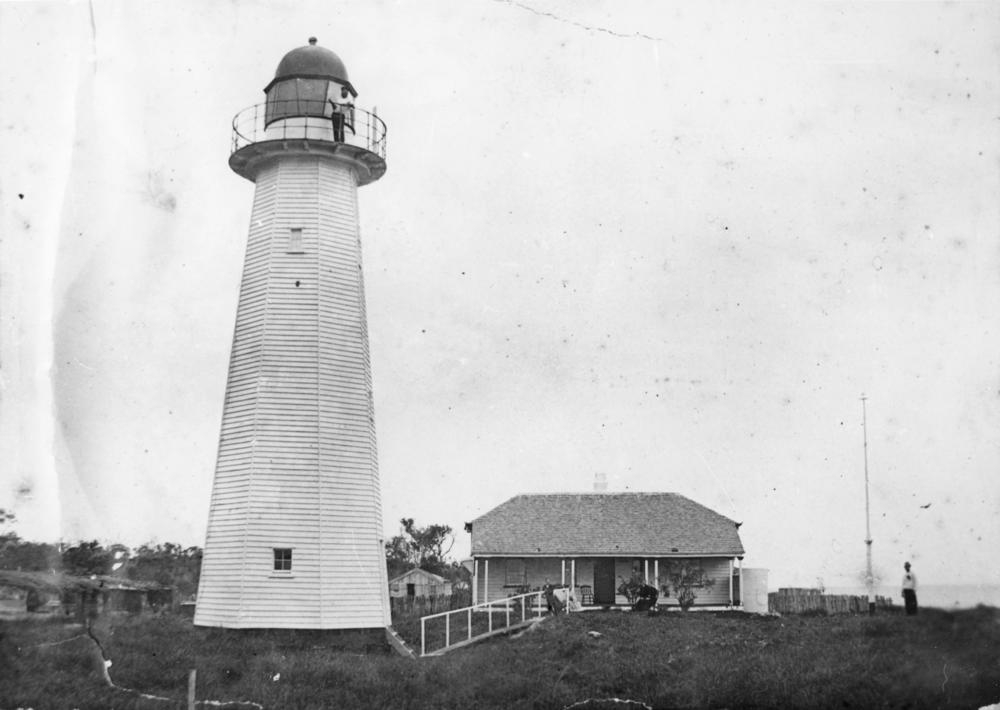
- Cowan Cowan Point Light in 1899
- Location: Moreton Island; Queensland; Australia
- Coordinates: 27.13655°S 153.36282°E

Tower
- Constructed: 1860s (first); 1874 (second)
- Construction: wooden tower
- Automated: 1950
- Height: 5.5 feet (1.7 m), from 1867 10 feet (3.0 m)
- Shape: hexagonal tower with balcony and lantern
- Markings: white tower and red lantern dome

Light
- Focal height: 9 m (30 ft)
- Light source: acetylene in 1950
- Range: 12 nautical miles (22 km; 14 mi)
- Characteristic: Fl WRG 2s

Cowan Cowan Point Light, also known as Cowan Cowan Light or Cowan Point Light, was located on Cowan Cowan Point, on the western shore of Moreton Island, Queensland, Australia.

== History ==
The first settlement at the point was a pilot station, moved from Amity Point in August 1848. The pilot station was later moved to Bulwer. The first lighthouse was constructed in the early 1860s, a 18 feet (5.5 m) wooden tower. It carried a large kerosene burner with a reflector and showed a fixed white light. In 1867, together with the construction of the Comboyuro Point Light tower, the tower was extended to 34 feet (10 m).

In 1873 it was decided that the tower should be upgraded again. The new lighthouse was constructed in 1874 by the brothers John and Jacob Rooney of Maryborough, who had already constructed Sandy Cape Light in 1870. The Rooney brothers also constructed Lady Elliot Island Light around the same time, and the same lantern plan was used for both lighthouses. They later constructed Cape Bowling Green Light in 1874, Cape Capricorn Light in 1875, and finally Booby Island Light in 1890. The apparatus was also upgraded and the old apparatus was installed on the old Comboyuro Point tower which was moved to Burnett Heads and is now known as the Old Burnett Heads Light. The light was intensified in 1883 by installed condensing prisms. Further construction is reported in 1899, though no details exist.

Coastal erosion problems were reported as early as 1898. In 1901 the tower and the cottage were moved 635 feet (194 m) inland to protect them from the aforementioned erosion. A 1909 listing describes the tower as a wooden tower, carrying a fixed fourth order dioptric apparatus. The light was showing red and white sectors and was visible for 12 nautical miles (22 km; 14 mi).

In 1909 the pilot station at Bulwer was closed except for a remaining signal station. In 1912 this signal station was moved to Cowan Cowan. For part of its lifetime, the signal station was operated by the Cowan Cowan light keeper. In 1950 the light was converted to acetylene gas, automated, and demanned.

The List of Lights lists an active light at the site, a square metal tower, which also serves as a daymark, with orange yellow squares on the northwest and southwest faces. The light, displayed at a focal height of 30 feet (9.1 m), is a flash every two seconds, white, red or green, depending on the direction (Fl.W.R.G. 2s), visible for 10 nautical miles (19 km; 12 mi). Green is shown on 345°−016°30′, red is shown on 016°30′−048°30′, 055°−132° and 141°−188° while white is displayed on 048°30′−055° and 132°−141°. The light is partially obscured by trees on 165°−188°.

== See also ==
- List of lighthouses in Australia
