= SS Marloo =

- Location within Queensland Location within Australia
- 24.9488°S 153.3035°E
- Location: Great Sandy National Park, Fraser Island, Fraser Coast Region, Queensland, Australia

Queensland Heritage Register
- Official name: Protected Area – SS Marloo
- Type: protected area (archaeological)
- Designated: 12 October 2002
- Delisted: 2015
- Reference no.: 800001

SS Marloo is a shipwreck at Great Sandy National Park, Fraser Island, Fraser Coast Region, Queensland, Australia. It was added to the Queensland Heritage Register on 12 October 2002 but delisted in 2015.

== History ==
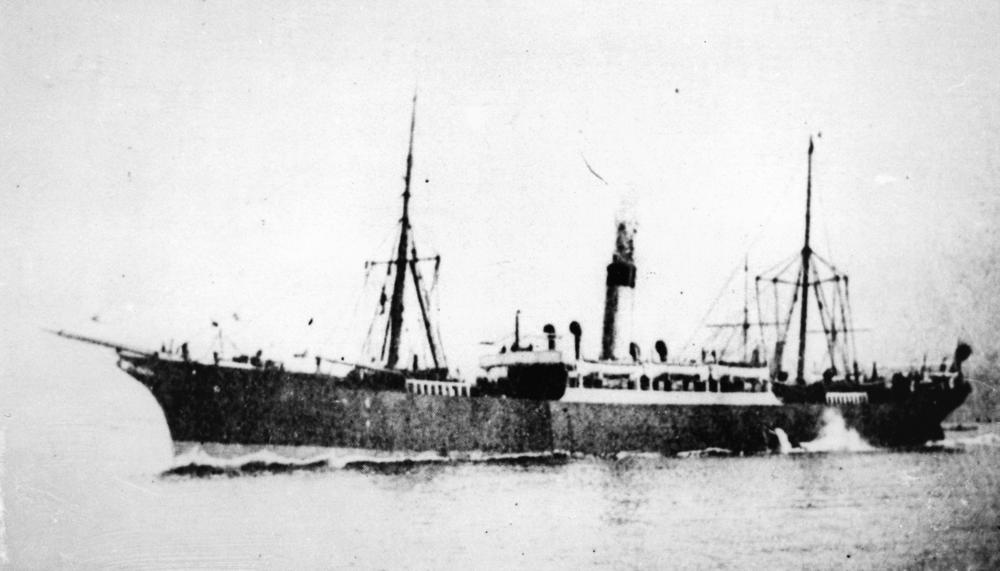
SS Marloo

SS Marloo was a steel steamer of 2628 tons owned by the Adelaide Steamship Company. Formerly the "Francesco Crispi", it was built at Newcastle upon Tyne, England in 1891.

In September 1914, SS Marloo was steaming from Mackay to Brisbane when she hit a submerged danger on Sandy Cape Shoal off Fraser Island. She was taking on water fast, so the captain steered the ship and deliberately beached it on Fraser Island about 3 miles (4.8 km) north of Waddy Point on 27 September 1914. The crew and all 38 passengers were rescued. A subsequent enquiry found the ship's captain was at fault for not exercising sufficient care and attention in navigation in an area of known dangers. Most of the steamer's cargo was salvaged before a north-easterly gale frustrated attempts to refloat her and she soon went to pieces. The remains of the Marloo have been blasted to recover brass.

Over the years, some of the wreckage became disassociated from the main wreck, which led to a listing on the Queensland Heritage Register in 2002 in an attempt to protect the disassociated wreckage. However, in 2015, it was delisted from the Queensland Heritage Register as the Australian Government's Shipwreck Act now provides adequate protection for the sites containing relics of shipwrecks.

== Description ==
The wreck of the SS Marloo are located on the beach about 4 kilometres (2.5 mi) northwest of Waddy Point on Fraser Island in about 8 to 9 metres (26 to 30 ft) of water. The remains are located below the surface and are sometimes exposed due to tidal events and erosion. The remains were exposed in October 2002. They were visible again in January 2021.

== Heritage listing ==
The SS Marloo was listed on the Queensland Heritage Register on 12 October 2002; it was declared by regulation of the Queensland Heritage Act 1992 (see Section 8 of the Queensland Heritage Regulation 2003) to be a protected area.
