= Booby Island Light =

Lighthouse in Queensland, Australia

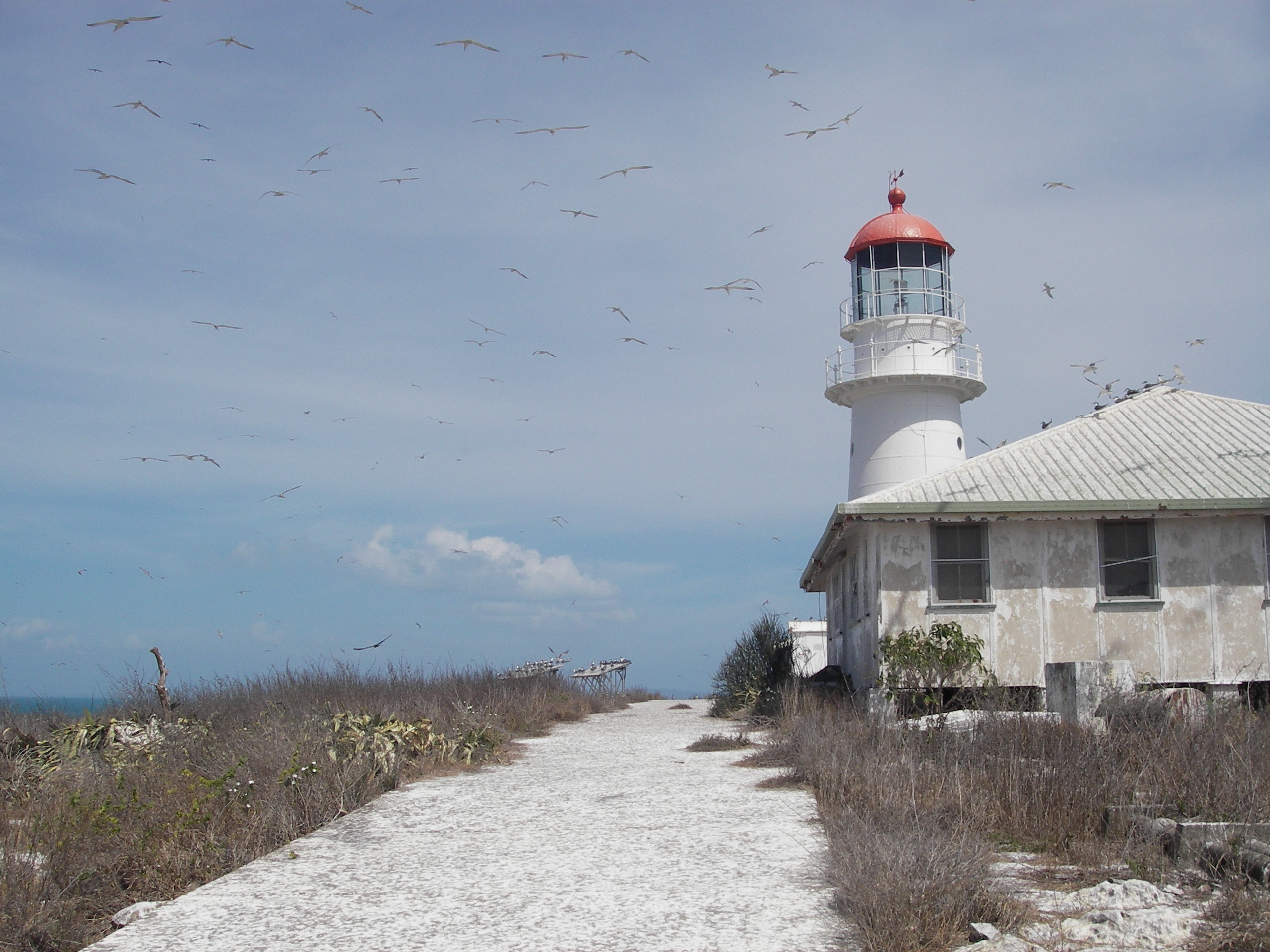
- Booby Island Lighthouse and one of the deteriorated cottages
- Location: Booby Island, Queensland, Australia
- Coordinates: 10°36′15″S 141°54′40″E

Tower
- Constructed: 1890
- Construction: timber frame clad with galvanised iron
- Automated: 1992
- Height: 59 feet (18 m)
- Shape: conical tower with balcony and lantern
- Markings: White (tower), red (dome)
- Heritage: listed on the Queensland Heritage Register, listed on the Register of the National Estate

Light
- Focal height: 121 feet (37 m)
- Lens: second order Fresnel lens
- Range: 20 nmi (37 km; 23 mi)
- Characteristic: Fl W 10s.

Booby Island Light is an active heritage-listed lighthouse located on Booby Island in the Shire of Torres, near the tip of Cape York Peninsula, west of Prince of Wales Island, within the Endeavour Strait, Queensland, Australia. It marks the western entrance to the navigation channel through the Torres Strait. It was the last of the major lights to be constructed along the Queensland coast.

== History ==
The colony of Queensland was formed in 1859. In 1862, the Queensland government appointed the first Portmaster, Commander George Poynter Heath. During the following years, several committees were held, but none of them recommended the erection of a lighthouse on Booby Island. It was Heath who first recommended the construction of such a lighthouse, at the Intercolonial Conference of Marine Departments in 1873, where a first order light was finally recommended by the delegates. However, this recommendation was not followed through, and it was only in August 1885 that Heath referred to the lighthouse again, as trade through the Torres Strait increased, and a traffic channel west of the Prince of Wales Island was established. Formal approval took four more years, and tenders for the lighthouse were called in April 1899. The accepted tender of £3329 was by the brothers John and Jacob Rooney of Maryborough, which also constructed Sandy Cape Light, Cape Bowling Green Light, Cowan Cowan Point Light, Cape Capricorn Light and Lady Elliot Island Light. The light was first exhibited on 24 June 1890, and the total cost of construction was £6,500. Residences for the lighthouse keepers were also constructed in 1890.

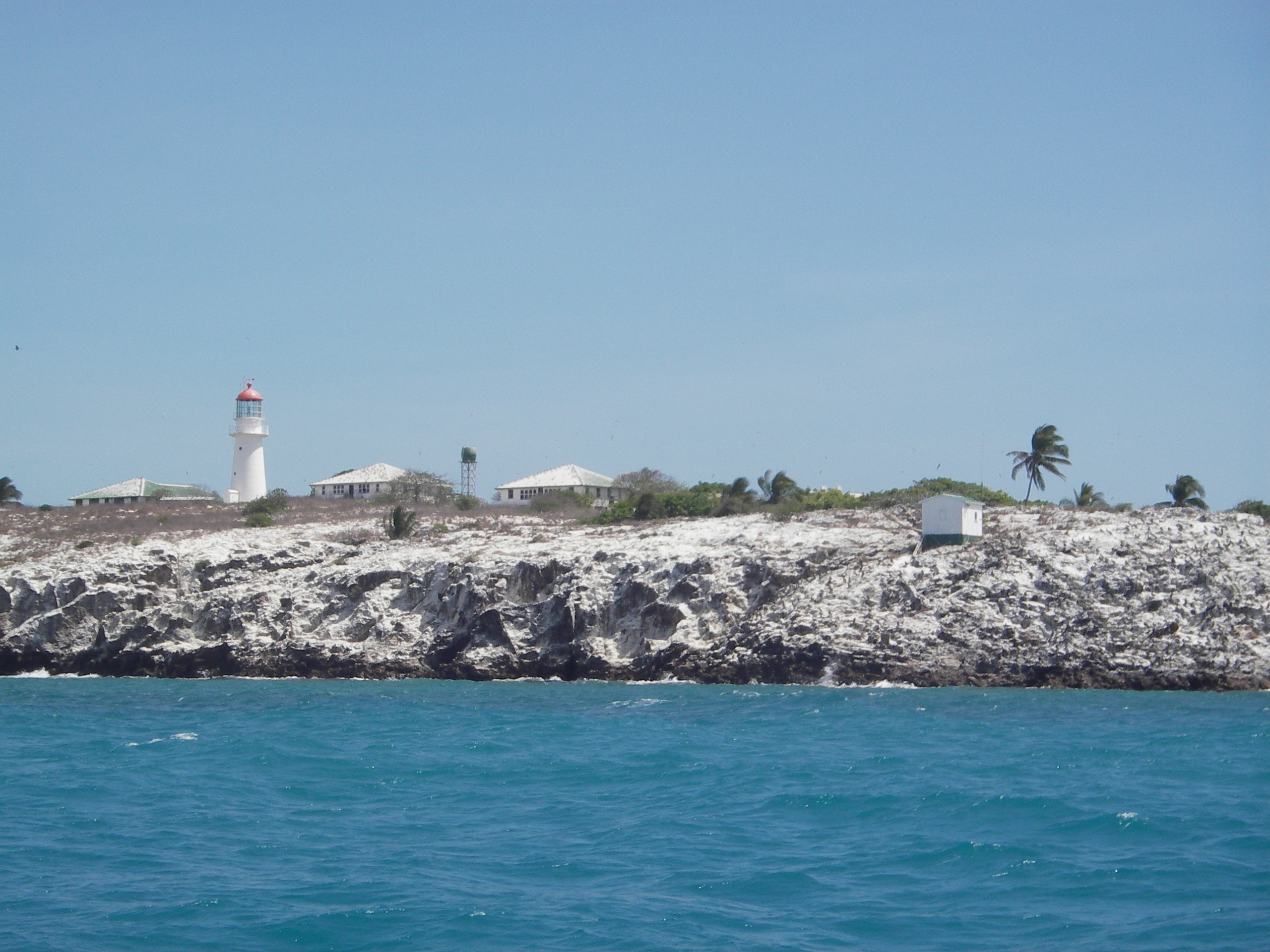
Booby Island Lightstation from the sea

The original lens was a second order Chance Brothers Fresnel lens, with a focal radius of 800 millimetres (31 in), mounted on a rotating pedestal with mercury bearings. The light source was an oil wick burner with an intensity of 20,000 cd. In 1917 the light source was upgraded to an 85 millimetres (3.3 in) vaporised kerosene mantle, with an intensity of 120,000 cd.

In 1961 a radio beacon was installed. In 1963 the lighthouse was converted to electricity. The light source at that time was a 120 Volt 1,000 Watt tungsten-halogen lamp providing 1,000,000 cd and visible for 26 nautical miles (48 km; 30 mi). The light characteristic was one flash every four seconds (Fl.W. 4s). A tide gauge was installed in 1970.

In November 1991 the power source was converted to solar power. The original lens and the pedestal were removed, the mercury drained, and the entire apparatus replaced with a modern rotating mechanism. The original apparatus now resides in the Thursday Island Museum. The battery banks were installed in the ground floor of the tower. The light characteristic was changed to the current, one white flash every ten seconds (Fl.W. 10s), and it is visible for 20 nautical miles (37 km; 23 mi). The light was fully automated and demanned in 1992.

== Structures ==
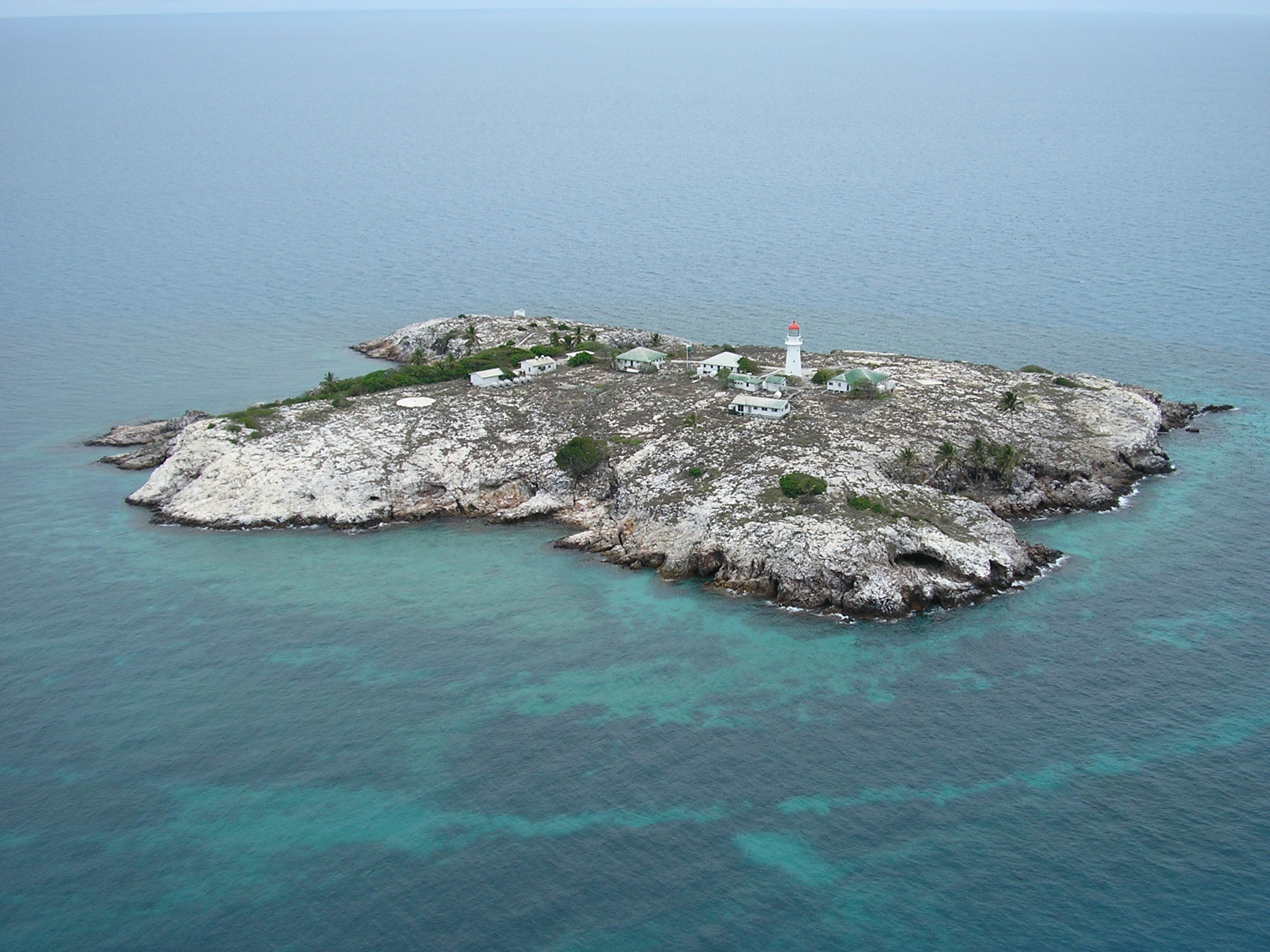
An aerial view of the island, showing the lighthouse and other structures.

The lighthouse is conical, 18 metres (59 ft) high, made of timber frame clad with galvanised iron. The tower is topped by the original 10 feet 1 inch (3.07 m) diameter Chance Brothers lantern. It is painted white, with red dome of sheet copper. The dome is topped by a rounded knob and a weather vane.

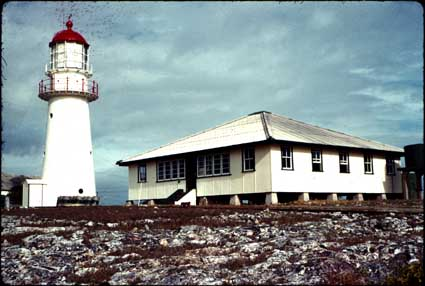
The lighthouse and one of the quarters, 1957

The residences include four cottages, three for the resident lighthouse keepers and an additional relief quarters. The resident keeper residences were built in 1890, and then renovated twice, in the 1920s and 1960s. They are timber-framed, clad with weatherboards and fibre cement. Also associated with these quarters is a glasshouse, timber-framed with external concrete block walls and a corrugated asbestos cement roof. The relief quarters, built in the late 1960s or early 1970s, are timber-framed with external walls of asbestos sheeting and a roof of corrugated asbestos cement.

Other buildings in the station include a radio equipment building that doubles as an office, a powerhouse with a fuel store, the tide gauge hut, the radio beacon transmitter building and a workshop. The radio equipment building is timber-framed with external painted concrete block walls and corrugated asbestos cement roof. The powerhouse and the fuel store are constructed of concrete blocks with a corrugated zinc sheeted roof. The powerhouse houses three diesel alternators which provide power to the station. The tide gauge hut, constructed in 1970, is timber-framed with fibre cement sheeting, a galvanised metal deck and an aluminium louvre mechanism. The radio beacon transmitter building, constructed in 1961, is built of concrete blocks with timber framed doors and aluminium hopper windows. Finally, the workshop is timber-framed with fibre cement walls and corrugated asbestos cement roof.

== Site operation and visiting ==
The light is operated by the Australian Maritime Safety Authority. The site is managed by the Queensland Parks and Wildlife Service. The location is accessible only by boat, and a special permit is required for landing. Both the tower and the location are closed to the public.

== Heritage listing ==
The lighthouse was listed on the Queensland Heritage Register in 1998.

== See also ==
- List of lighthouses in Australia
