= Cape Bowling Green Light =

Lighthouse in Queensland, Australia

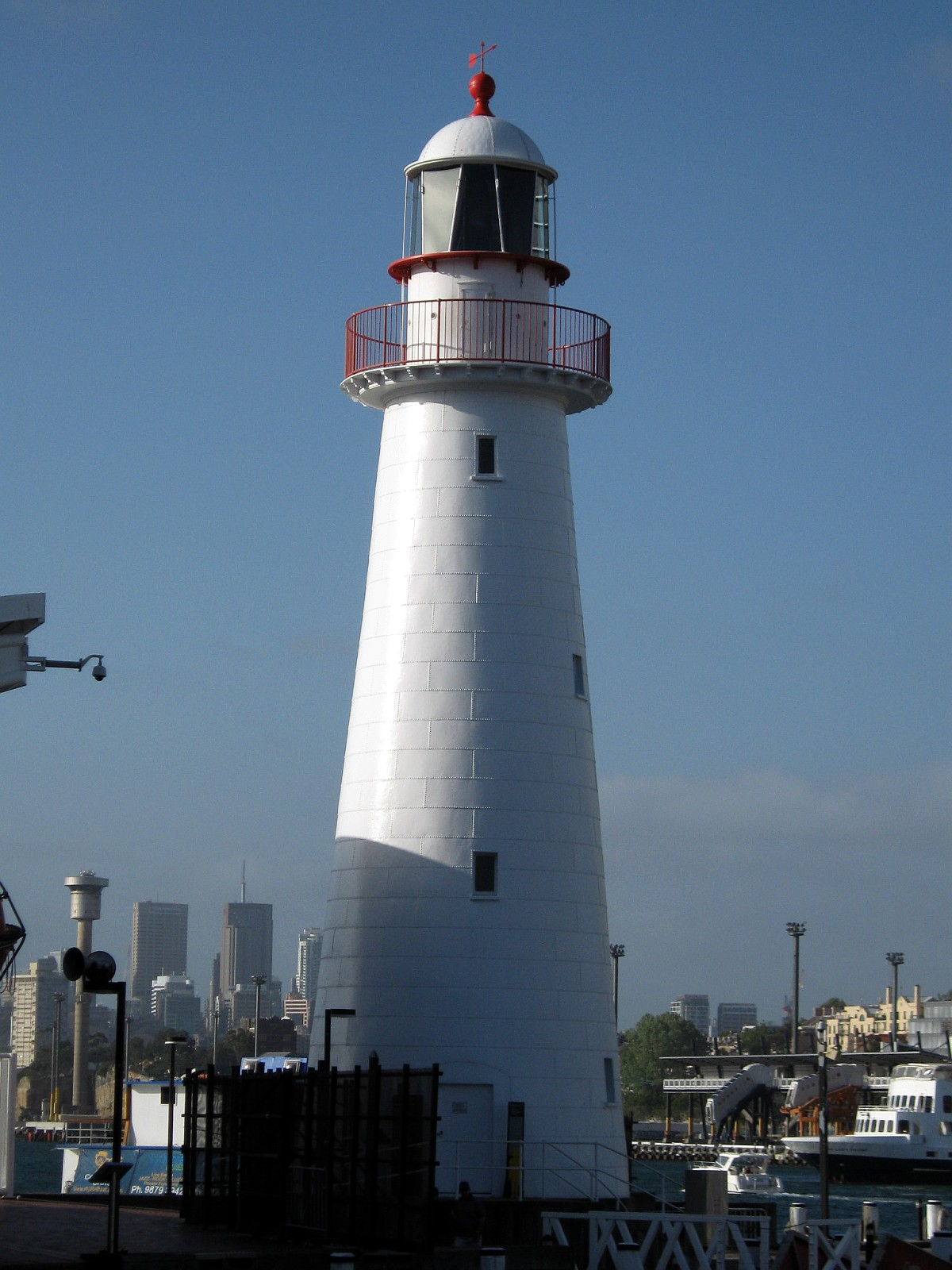
- Cape Bowling Green Lighthouse at the Australian National Maritime Museum, 2008
- Location: Sydney, New South Wales, Australia
- Coordinates: 33°52′07″S 151°11′57″E

Tower
- Constructed: 1874
- Construction: hardwood timber frame clad with galvanized iron plates
- Automated: 1920
- Height: 22 metres (72 ft)
- Shape: conical tower with balcony and lantern
- Markings: white tower and lantern, red rail

Light
- Deactivated: 1987
- Focal height: 19 m (62 ft)
- Lens: 3rd order Chance Brothers
- Characteristic: Fl(4) W 20s
- Current light
- Constructed: 1987
- Construction: metal skeletal tower
- Height: 105 ft (32 m)
- Shape: square pyramidal tower with balcony and lantern
- Markings: white tower with red upper band
- Operator: Australian Maritime Safety Authority
- Focal height: 118 ft (36 m)
- Range: 11 nmi (20 km; 13 mi)
- Characteristic: Fl(4) W 20s

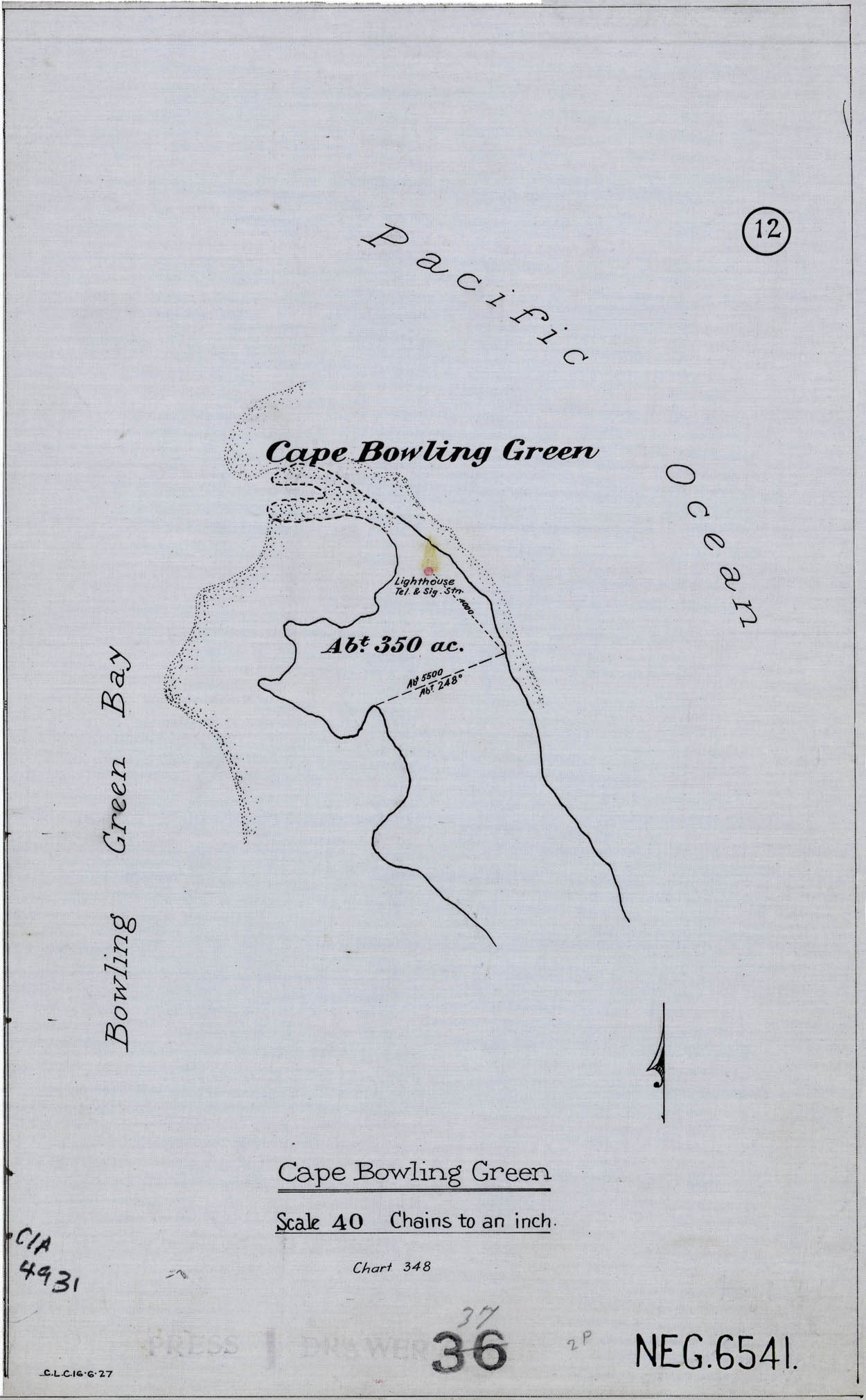
Map showing the position of the lighthouse on Cape Bowling Green, 1927

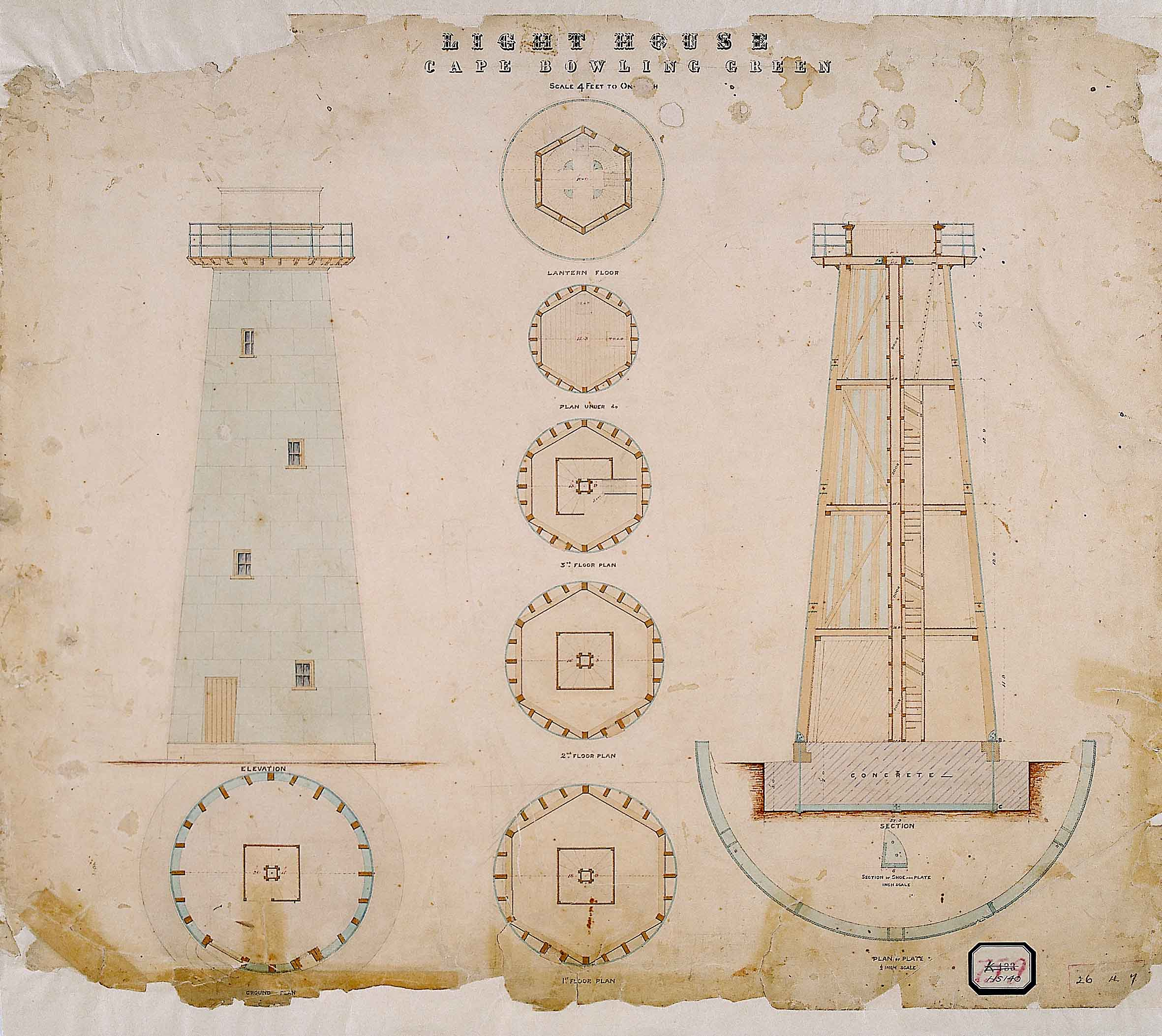
Plans of the first lighthouse

Cape Bowling Green Light is an active lighthouse on Cape Bowling Green, a long headland ending in a long low sandspit, about 30 kilometres (19 mi) from Ayr, Queensland, Australia. The lighthouse is at the end of the headland, near the base of the sandspit. The first lighthouse at the location, established in 1874, was moved multiple times. It was prefabricated in Brisbane, shipped to the location, moved twice due to coastal erosion and finally transferred for display at the Australian National Maritime Museum at Darling Harbour in Sydney.

== History ==
Cape Bowling Green was named by James Cook on his 1770 exploration of the Australian east coast.

Many ships wrecking at Cape Bowling Green necessitated the construction of a lighthouse at the cape. The first Cape Bowling Green Light was constructed in 1874, one of 22 lighthouses of a similar design constructed in Queensland around that time. It was a round conical tower, constructed of local hardwood timber frame clad with galvanized iron plates imported from Britain. The lighthouse was prefabricated in Brisbane, then dismantled and shipped to the location to be erected again. The construction was done by the brothers John and Jacob Rooney of Maryborough, which also constructed Sandy Cape Light, Cowan Cowan Point Light, Cape Capricorn Light, Lady Elliot Island Light and Booby Island Light.

The original lens was a 3rd order Chance Brothers dioptric lens, and the light source was a kerosene wick lamp with an intensity of 13,000 cd, visible for 14 nautical miles (26 km; 16 mi). The apparatus was rotated with a clockwork mechanism and the station was operated by four lighthouse keepers, a chief and three assistants.

In 1878 beach erosion threatened the lighthouse for the first time and it was moved for the first time. In 1908 the tower had to be relocated further away for the same reason.

In 1913 an incandescent gas mantle operated by vaporised kerosene was installed, raising the power to 64,000 cd. In 1920 a fixed automatic acetylene gas lamp (carbide lamp) with a sun valve was installed. As a result, the lighthouse was demanned and all other buildings were demolished.

In 1985 a racon was installed. In 1987 the lighthouse was replaced by the current skeletal tower. With the sponsorship of the Australian Maritime Safety Authority, the lighthouse was dismantled, and sections were lifted by a Department of Transport helicopter to a site where they were numbered, crated, and shipped to Sydney. By 1994 the lighthouse was reassembled at the Australian National Maritime Museum where it is now on display. The lighthouse is still operational, using the original 3rd order lens and a typical 1913 clockwork mechanism, and it maintains its original light characteristic, four white flashes every twenty seconds (Fl.(4)W. 20s).

== Current structure and display ==
The current tower is a square steel skeletal tower. It is topped by a square lantern structure with a gallery. It is painted white with a red horizontal band at the top. The light characteristic shown is four white flashes every twenty seconds (Fl.(4)W. 20s), visible for 11 nautical miles (20 km; 13 mi).

== Site operation and visiting ==
The current lighthouse is operated by the AMSA. The visiting status is unclear. The original lighthouse is owned and operated by the Australian National Maritime Museum, and it is open for guided tours daily.

== See also ==
- List of lighthouses in Australia
