= Sandy Cape =

Cape in Australia

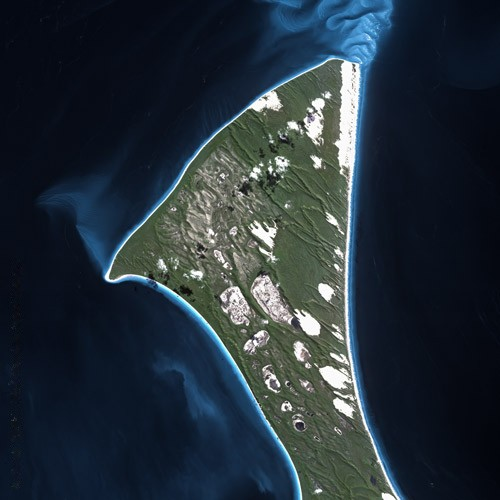
Sandy Cape is Fraser Island's most northerly point

Sandy Cape (also known by the Indigenous name of Woakoh) is the most northern point on Fraser Island (also known as K'gari and Gari) off the coast of Queensland, Australia. The place was named Sandy Cape for its appearance by James Cook during his 1770 voyage up the eastern coast of Australia aboard the Endeavour.

== Geography ==
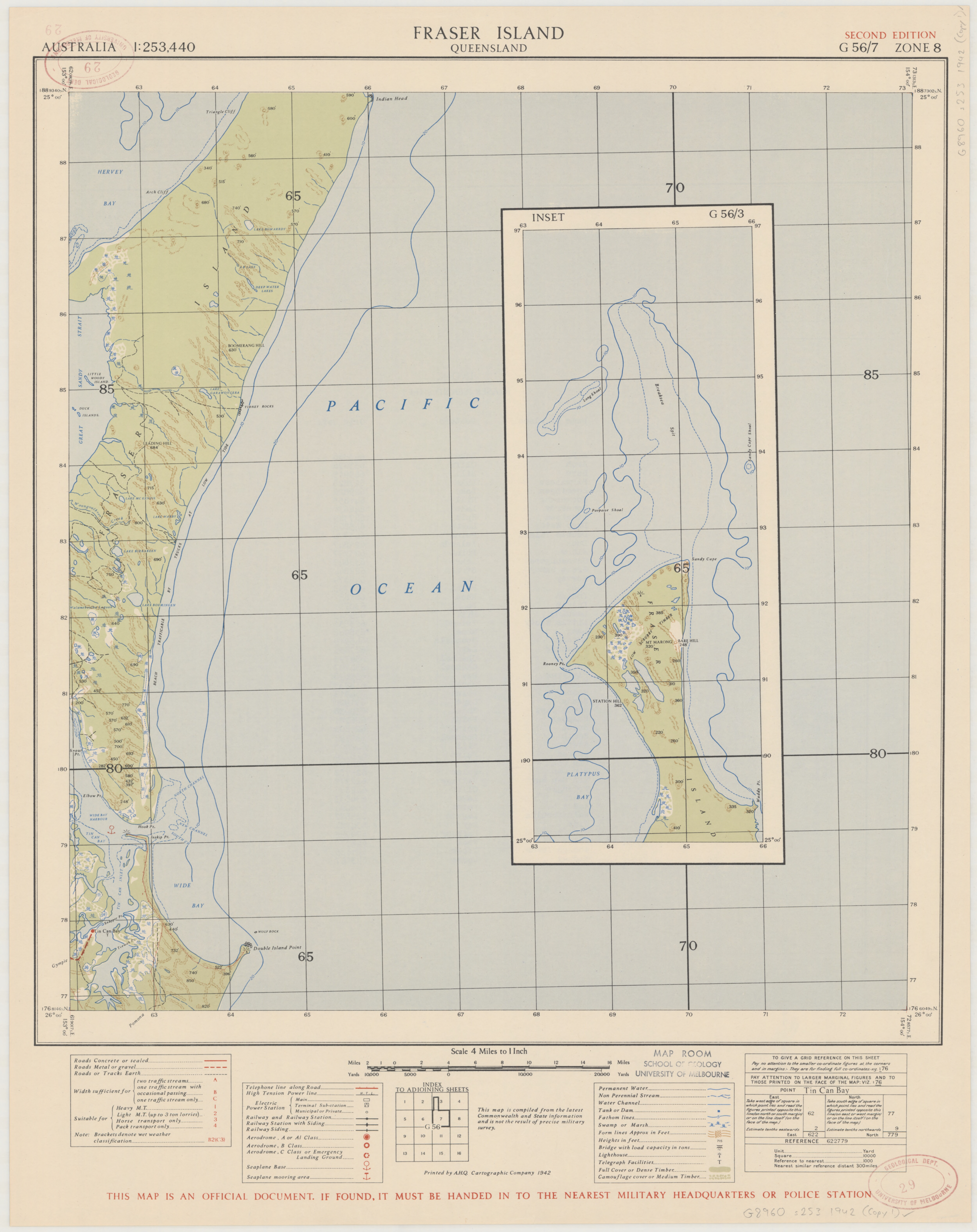
Sandy Cape on topo map sheet

To the south the next two ocean headlands are Waddy Point and Indian Head (the latter was also named by Cook noting "...on which a number of Natives were assembled..." and is also known as Tukkee in the Badtjala language, meaning stone or stone knife).

The cape is protected within the K'gari section of the Great Sandy National Park. BreakSea Spit extends about 30 kilometres (19 mi) north of Sandy Cape. Nesting loggerhead and green turtles use the remote, sandy location as a rookery. Nighttime driving along the beach at Sandy Cape is banned during the nesting season. The vegetation at the cape is stunted and windswept. The foredunes are lightly covered by spinifex grass.

=== Climate ===
Sandy Cape has a humid subtropical climate bordering on a tropical monsoon climate and a tropical savanna climate (Köppen: Cfa/Am/Aw) with hot, wet summers and very mild, drier winters. On average, the lighthouse recorded 77.7 clear days and 101.2 cloudy days per annum. The wettest recorded day was 27 February 1980 with 432.4 mm (17.02 in) of rainfall. Moderated by the warm East Australian Current, Sandy Cape's extreme temperatures ranged from 36.0 °C (96.8 °F) on 22 December 2019 to 5.2 °C (41.4 °F) on 2 July 2007.

Climate data for Sandy Cape Light (24.73°S 153.21°E) (99 m (325 ft) AMSL) (1871-2025)
Month	Jan	Feb	Mar	Apr	May	Jun	Jul	Aug	Sep	Oct	Nov	Dec	Year
Record high °C (°F)	34.2 (93.6)	35.8 (96.4)	34.7 (94.5)	31.9 (89.4)	28.7 (83.7)	27.8 (82.0)	26.5 (79.7)	27.2 (81.0)	29.3 (84.7)	31.8 (89.2)	33.8 (92.8)	36.0 (96.8)	36.0 (96.8)
Mean daily maximum °C (°F)	29.4 (84.9)	29.3 (84.7)	28.5 (83.3)	26.8 (80.2)	24.1 (75.4)	21.8 (71.2)	21.2 (70.2)	22.3 (72.1)	24.3 (75.7)	26.1 (79.0)	27.6 (81.7)	28.9 (84.0)	25.9 (78.5)
Mean daily minimum °C (°F)	22.4 (72.3)	22.4 (72.3)	21.7 (71.1)	19.9 (67.8)	17.5 (63.5)	15.3 (59.5)	14.3 (57.7)	15.1 (59.2)	16.9 (62.4)	18.7 (65.7)	20.3 (68.5)	21.6 (70.9)	18.8 (65.9)
Record low °C (°F)	16.7 (62.1)	16.1 (61.0)	14.6 (58.3)	13.3 (55.9)	9.6 (49.3)	6.7 (44.1)	5.2 (41.4)	5.6 (42.1)	9.4 (48.9)	11.2 (52.2)	13.9 (57.0)	16.0 (60.8)	5.2 (41.4)
Average precipitation mm (inches)	159.6 (6.28)	168.0 (6.61)	157.3 (6.19)	119.9 (4.72)	117.6 (4.63)	107.6 (4.24)	87.1 (3.43)	61.9 (2.44)	50.6 (1.99)	64.4 (2.54)	72.9 (2.87)	98.9 (3.89)	1,265.9 (49.84)
Average precipitation days (≥ 0.2 mm)	13.5	14.3	16.4	15.4	15.1	12.5	11.4	9.5	7.9	8.2	8.8	10.5	143.5
Average afternoon relative humidity (%)	69	71	70	68	67	67	64	62	62	65	66	68	67
Average dew point °C (°F)	20.9 (69.6)	21.2 (70.2)	20.1 (68.2)	18.1 (64.6)	15.7 (60.3)	13.6 (56.5)	12.0 (53.6)	12.5 (54.5)	14.3 (57.7)	16.4 (61.5)	18.2 (64.8)	20.0 (68.0)	16.9 (62.5)
Source: Bureau of Meteorology (1871-2025)

== History ==
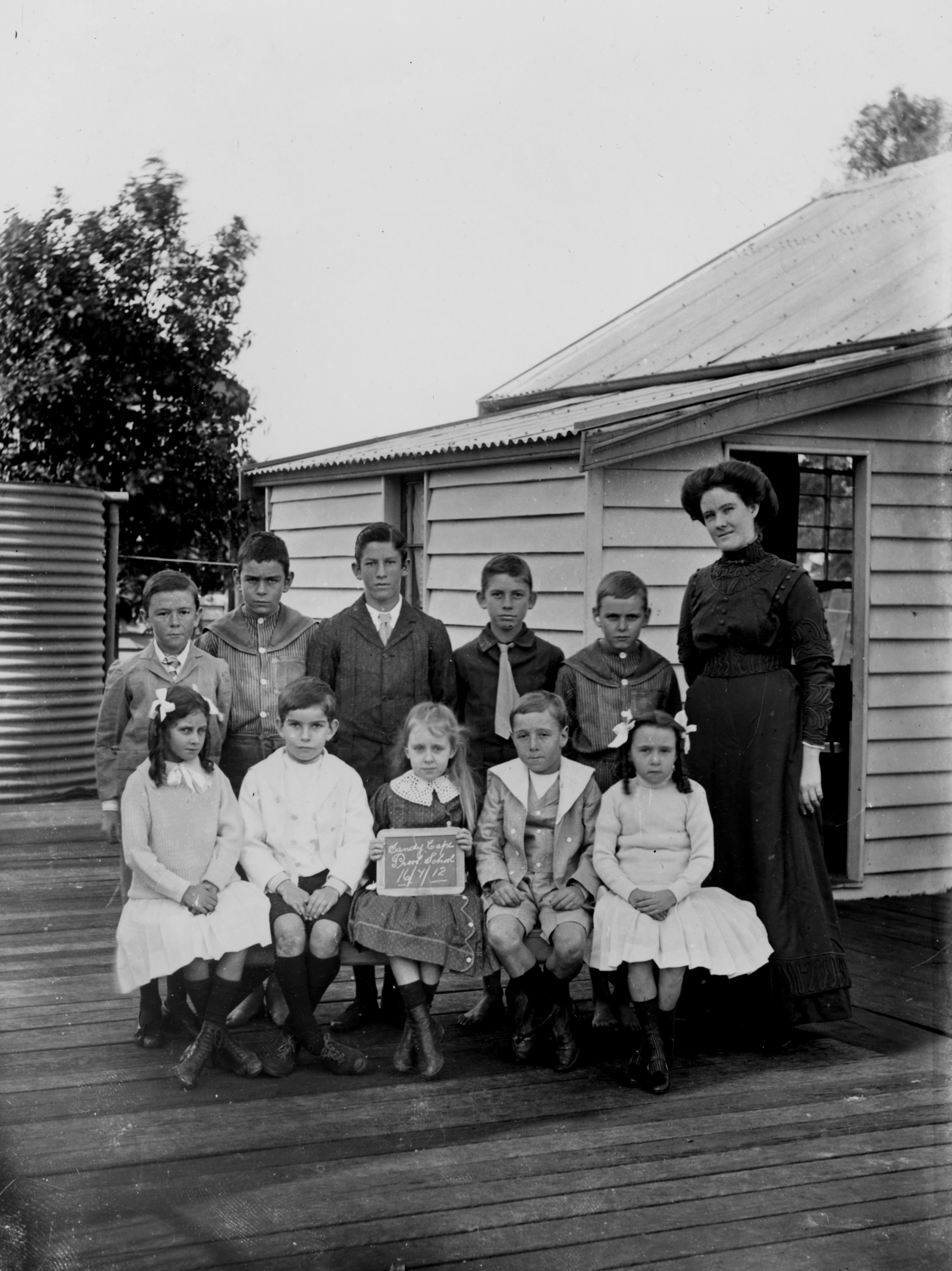
Students and teacher at the Sandy Cape Provisional School, 1912

Matthew Flinders, travelling aboard the Investigator, landed at Sandy Cape in 1802 and noted the desolate landscape. In August 1803, the ships Cato and Porpoise were both sunk off the cape in bad weather.

In late December 1842, HMS Fly anchored behind Sandy Cape where some crewmen and naturalists went ashore and commented on the poor sparse surroundings. The Fly returned in April 1845 and took water from an abundant supply behind the beach and about 7 miles within the Cape.

The Seabelle was wrecked in 1857, the American Bark "Panama" in 1864, and the Chang Chow in 1884 in waters closer to the cape which may contain hidden sandbars. Because of the number of shipwrecks in the vicinity the Sandy Cape Light was constructed in 1870. This marked the first permanent European settlement on Fraser Island.

Sandy Cape Provisional School opened in September 1870, initially to provide schooling for the children of the four lighthouse keepers. By 1878, there were "30 to 40" children in the area. The school closed circa 1918.

The SS Marloo was wrecked in September 1914 on a shoal off Sandy Cape and was beached north of Waddy Point.

Clement Lindley Wragge set up an extensive network of weather stations around Queensland, including one at Sandy Cape in 1891. The cape is still used as a reference point for weather observations; however from May 2015, it has been downgraded to a daily observation, compared with the half-hourly observations at some other weather stations.

== Tourism ==
Vehicle access to Sandy Cape is only available by the eastern beach at low tide. Camping is permitted in the area and it is a popular location with anglers.

== See also ==
- Double Island Point
- List of lighthouses in Australia
