= Lady Elliot Island Light =

Lighthouse in Queensland, Australia

Old Lady Elliot Island Light
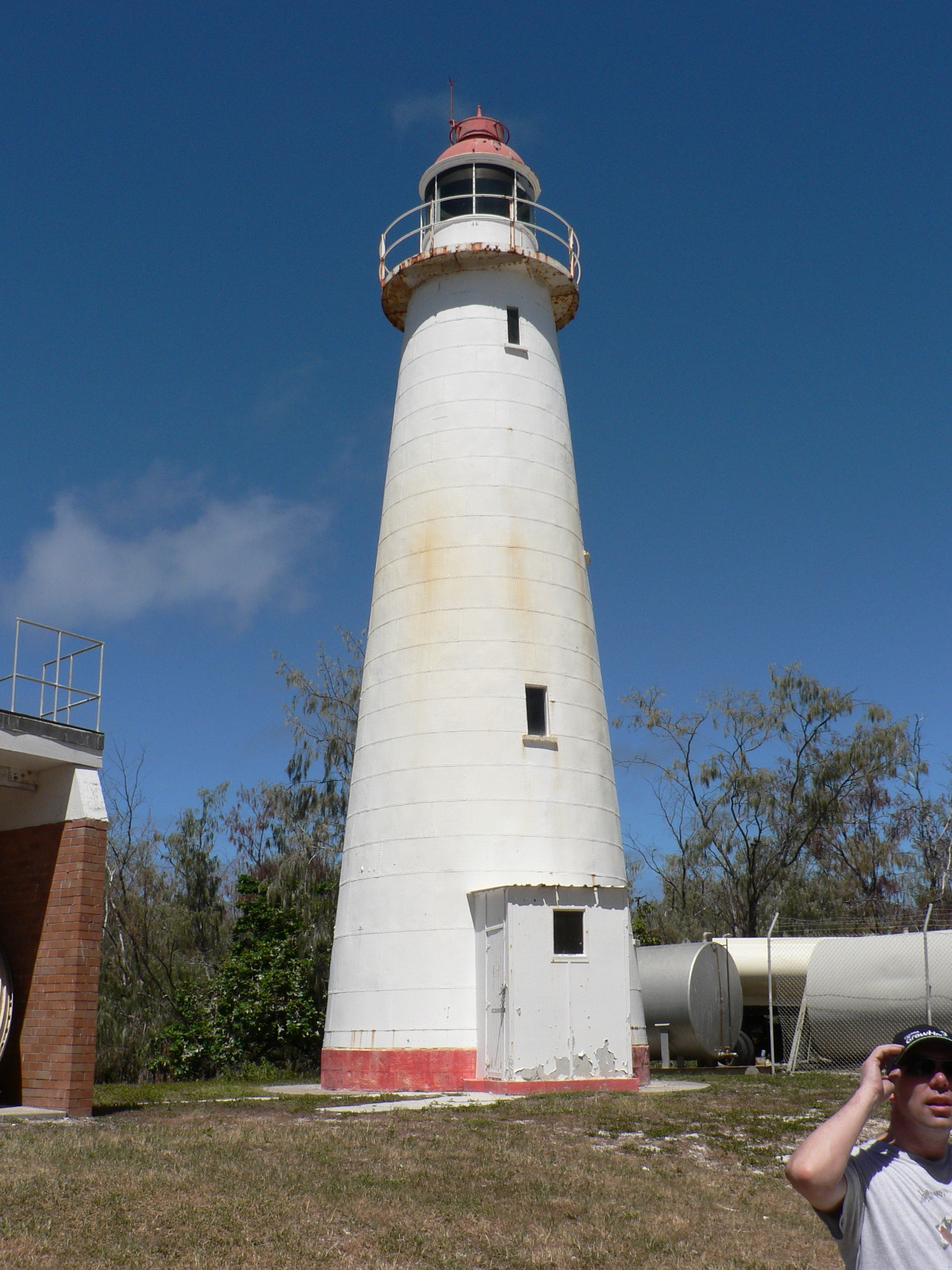
- The old Lady Elliot Island lighthouse
- Location: Lady Elliot Island; Queensland; Australia
- Coordinates: 24°06′53″S 152°42′42″E

Tower
- Constructed: 1866 (first); 1873 (second)
- Foundation: concrete tower
- Construction: timber frame clad with galvanised wrought iron plates
- Automated: 1982
- Height: 18 metres (59 ft)
- Shape: conical tower with balcony and lantern
- Markings: white tower and red dome
- Operator: Great Barrier Reef Marine Park
- Heritage: listed on the Commonwealth Heritage List

Light
- Deactivated: 1995
- Focal height: 24 metres (79 ft)

Lady Elliot Island Light is an active lighthouse located on Lady Elliot Island, the southernmost coral cay of the Great Barrier Reef, 46 nautical miles (85 km; 53 mi) north-east of Bundaberg, Queensland, Australia. The lighthouse is located on the western side of the island. It was the third lighthouse erected in Queensland after its formation in 1859 and the first in Australia to be constructed of a timber frame clad with iron plates. The original lighthouse was deactivated in 1995 and the light was replaced by a modern skeletal tower standing close to the original lighthouse.

== History ==
=== Establishment ===
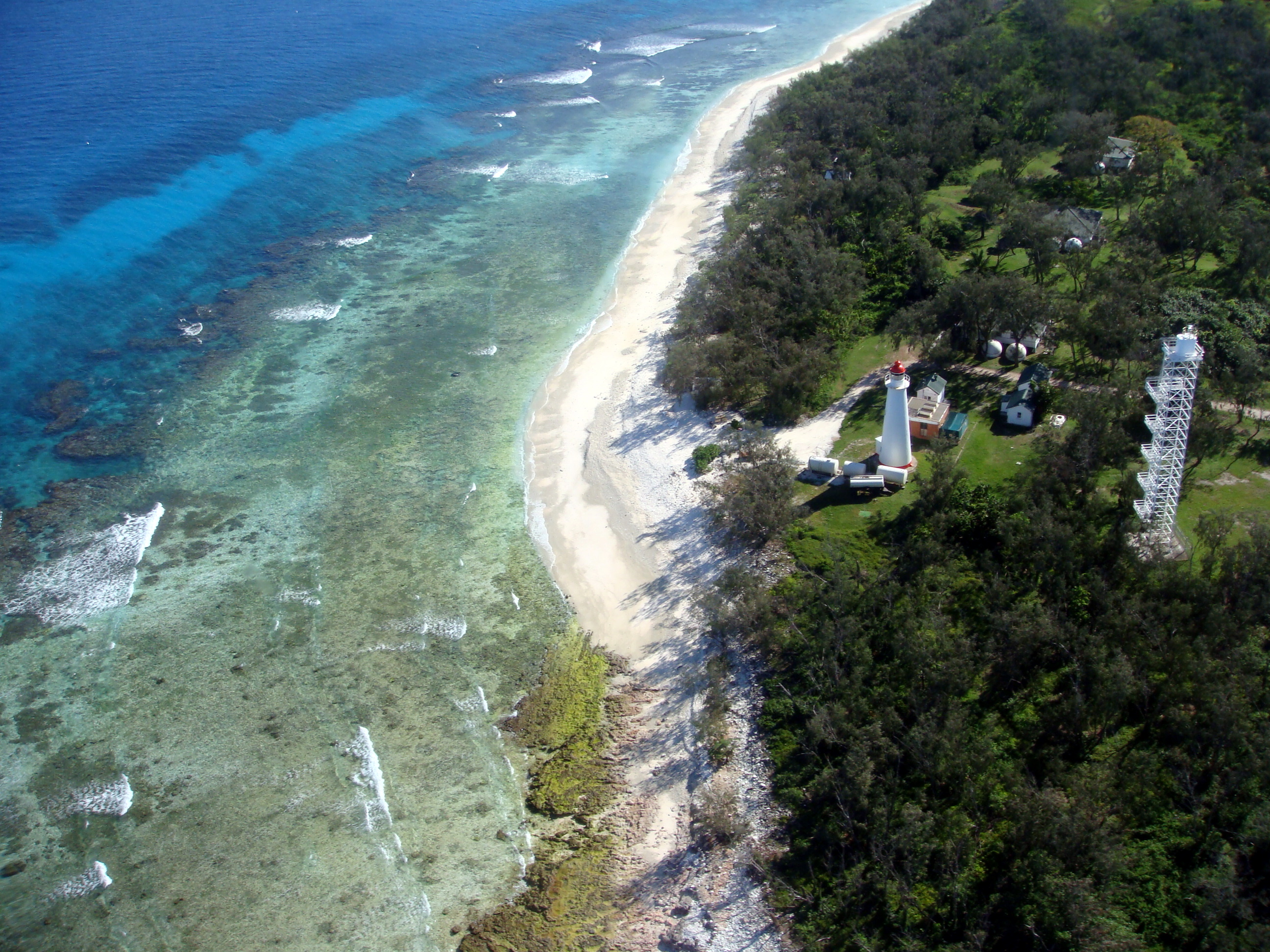
Aerial view of old and new lighthouses

The Government of Queensland was formed in 1859. In 1862, the Queensland government appointed the first Portmaster, Commander George Poynter Heath. However, it was not until 1864 that two committees were appointed to address the issue of coastal lighthouses. Lady Elliot Island was among the locations identified by the committees as a potentially suitable site for a lighthouse.

The first navigation light to actually be installed on Lady Elliot Island was installed two years later, in 1866, in connection with the guano mining company operating on the island which started in 1863. It was a temporary light installed on a tall mast, which survived until 1871 when it was destroyed by a gale and rebuilt.

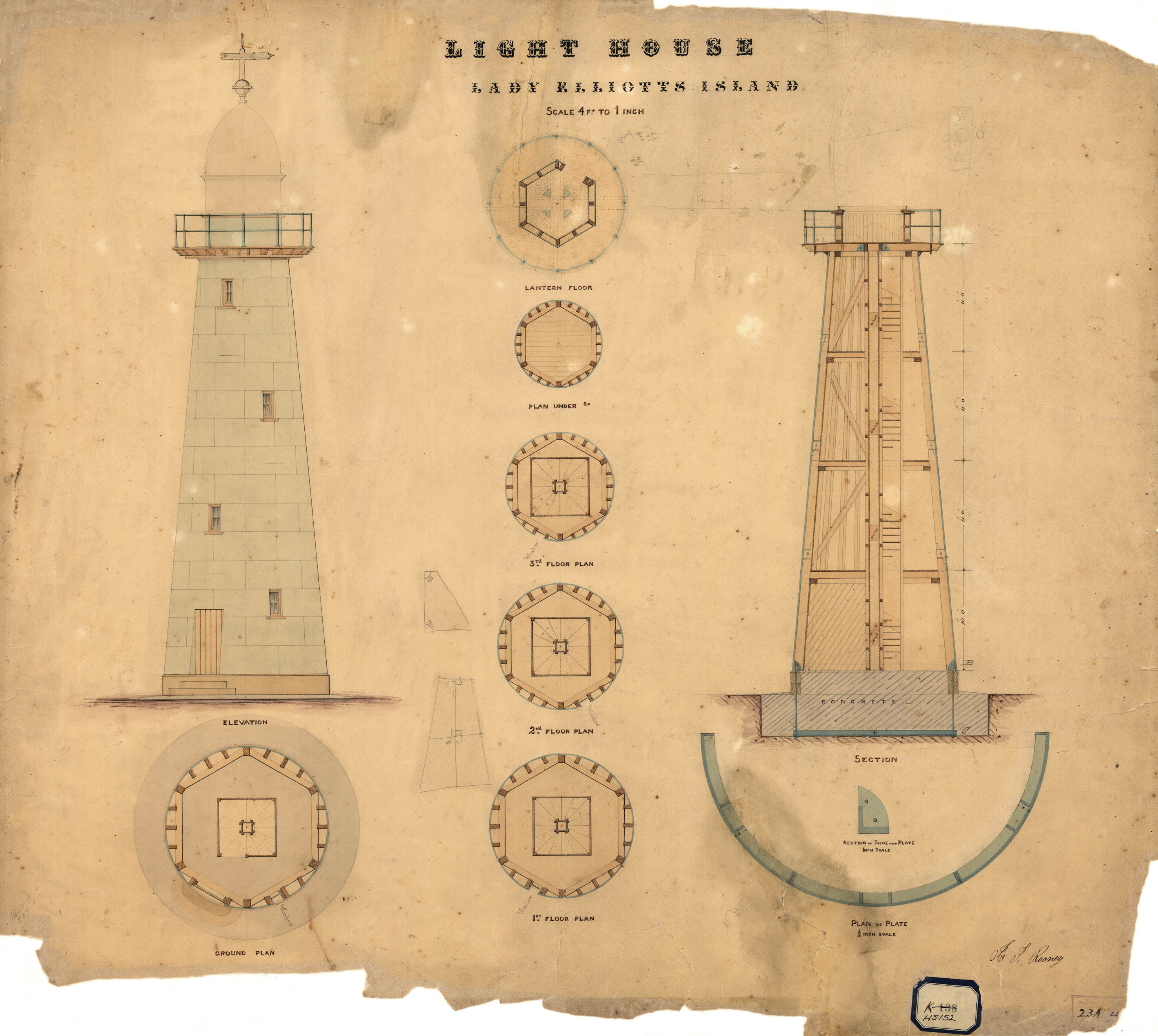
Lighthouse architectural plans, 1874

In 1872 plans were drawn for a new lighthouse, and tenders were called. The winning tender, for £749, was by the brothers John and Jacob Rooney of Maryborough, which also constructed Sandy Cape Light, Cowan Cowan Point Light, Cape Capricorn Light, Cape Bowling Green Light and Booby Island Light. The lighthouse was established in 1873, the third to be erected in Queensland since its formation in 1859, following Bustard Head Light in 1869 and Sandy Cape Light in 1870. By then, the guano mining operation has almost completely cleared the vegetation on the island. This was made worse by a herd of goats which were imported for meat and milk, which ate all growing vegetation. As the island had little topographical features to offer protection, to begin with, the station was completely unprotected from the powers of nature.

The lighthouse construction was the first of its kind in Australia. Unlike previous lighthouse using bolted segments of cast iron, the first of which were Troubridge Island Lighthouse constructed in 1856 in South Australia and the original Breaksea Island Light constructed in 1858 in Western Australia, as well as Sandy Cape Light and Bustard Head Light in Queensland, the tower used wrought iron plates mounted on a timber frame which supplied the structural strength, where the iron plates act as cladding. This was a cheaper method of construction, and following lighthouses in Queensland used this method predominantly. The iron cladding was prefabricated in England and shipped to the island in pieces, together with the imported lens, lantern and operating apparatus. The timber framing was prefabricated in Brisbane and shipped to the site. The light was originally a flashing 4,000 cd light.

The lighthouse was tended by a single lighthouse keeper, assisted by a member of the guano mining company when required, and only one cottage was constructed.

=== Development ===
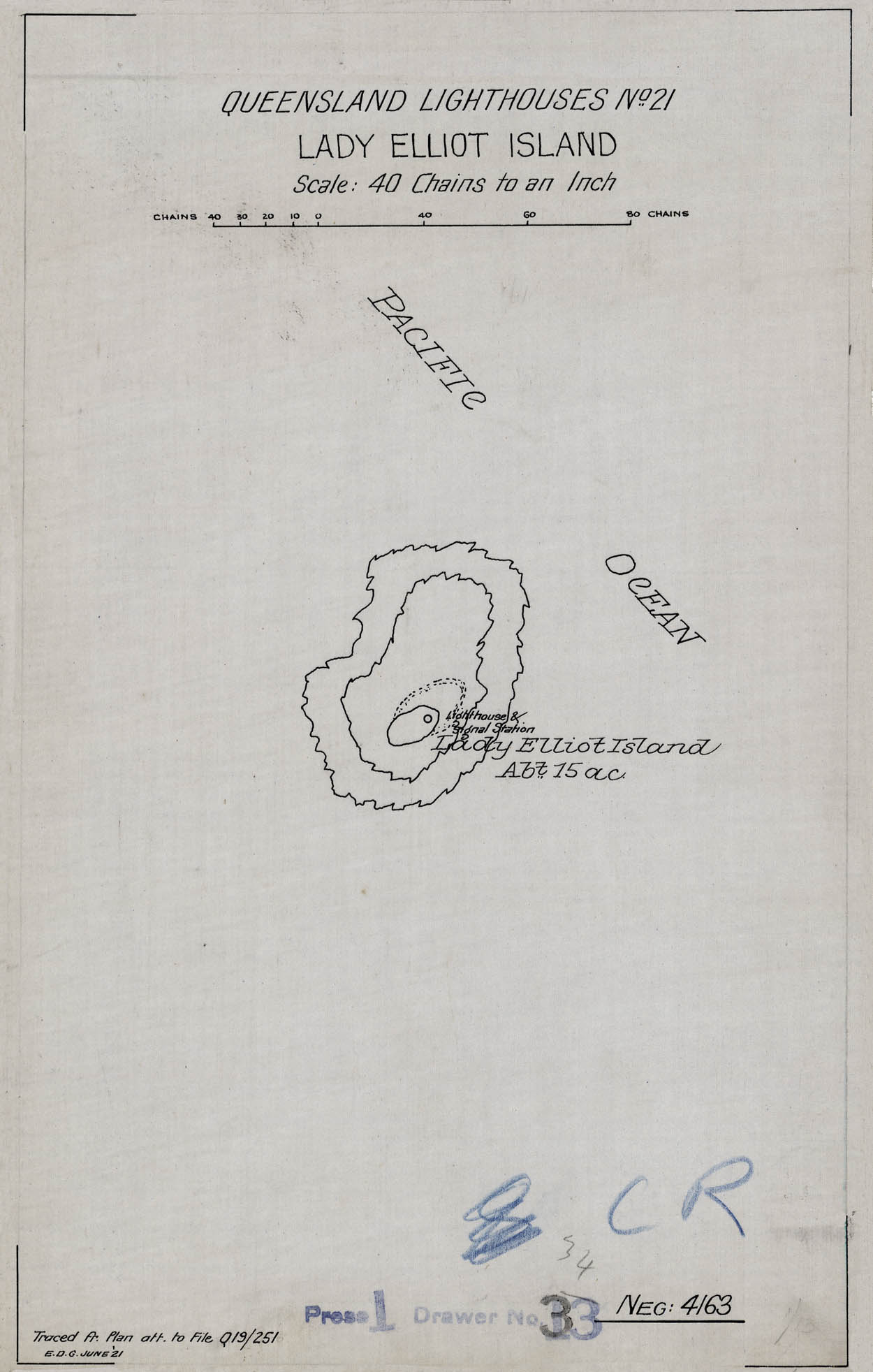
A 1921 plan showing the lighthouse location (traced from an earlier map)

By 1874 the guano mining on the island has ceased, and a second cottage was built soon after. The residences were to be rebuilt twice more. The first time was sometime in the 1900s. The second time was in 1925 when three new cottages were built as well as the boat shed and two more sheds for maintenance and storage.

In 1923 the light was upgraded from 4,000 cd to 23,000 cd. In 1928 it was upgraded again, to 85,000 cd, and the pedestal on which the lantern is positioned was modified. A weather station was established in 1939. In 1953 the lightstation was electrified and in 1982 it was automated. However, the station remained staffed due to the importance of the weather station. In 1988 the lighthouse was finally demanned. The mechanism was replaced by a solar powered light, and finally on 19 October 1988, the light keepers left.

=== Deactivation ===
The second half of the 20th century marked the re-vegetation of the island, which was to result in the final deactivation of the lighthouse. In 1966 lighthouse staff started the re-vegetation programme. The herd of goats was shot by the lighthouse staff in 1969. Casuarina trees which were planted by Don Adams in 1969 were allowed to grow over the years, and by 1995 the light was obscured. A new lighthouse was constructed by the Australian Maritime Safety Authority (AMSA), and the old lighthouse was shut down.

== Current structure and display ==
Lady Elliot Island Light (current)
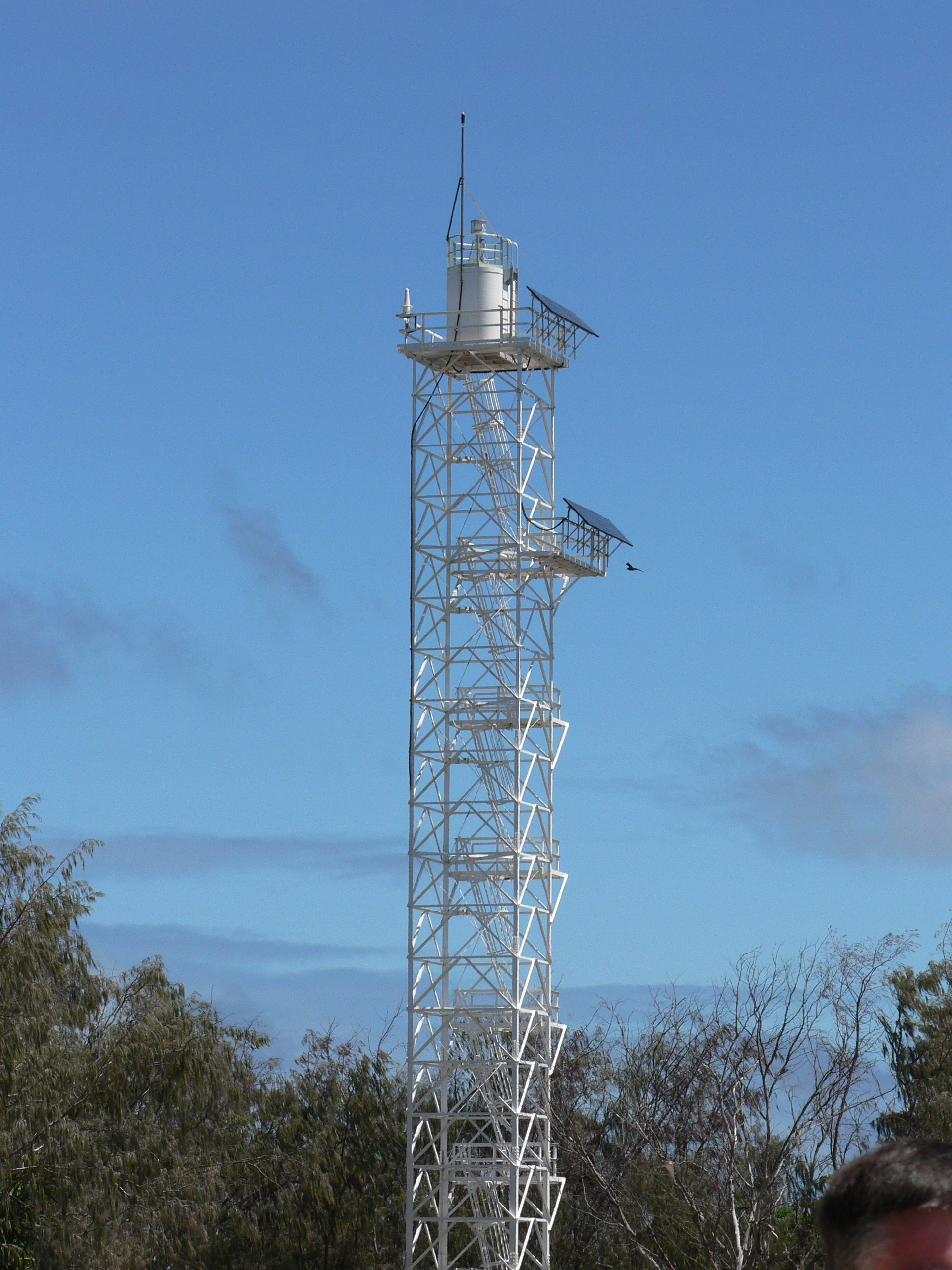
- The current Lady Elliot Island lighthouse
- Location: Lady Elliot Island, Burnett Heads, Queensland, Australia
- Coordinates: 24°06′53″S 152°42′43″E

Tower
- Constructed: 1995
- Construction: steel skeletal tower
- Automated: 1995
- Height: 105 ft (32 m)
- Shape: square prisml tower with balcony and lantern
- Markings: white tower and hut
- Power source: solar power
- Operator: Australian Maritime Safety Authority
- Racon: B

Light
- Focal height: 125 ft (38 m)
- Range: 20 nmi (37 km; 23 mi)
- Characteristic: Fl W 7.5s

The current active light is a square steel skeletal tower. It is topped by a white fiberglass hut with a gallery. The fully automated light consists of six beams and is solar powered, The light characteristic shown is a white flash every 7.5 seconds (Fl.W. 7.5s), visible for 20 nautical miles (37 km; 23 mi). A racon showing "B" is mounted at focal height of 17 feet (5.2 m).

== Structures ==
=== The lighthouse ===
The lighthouse is largely in its original form. It is round in form and conical in shape. The base of the tower is a massive concrete floor cast within a low stone wall, with a segmented cast iron ring bolted to it. The tower is made of a timber frame clad with galvanised wrought iron plates, about 2.5 millimetres (0.098 in) thick. The plates are riveted at the joints and screwed to the timber frame and the base ring. The tower is painted white. It is topped by a gallery and a lantern, both painted white, with the lantern dome painted red. One addition to the original plan was the addition of a skillion roofed entrance porch to the base of the tower.

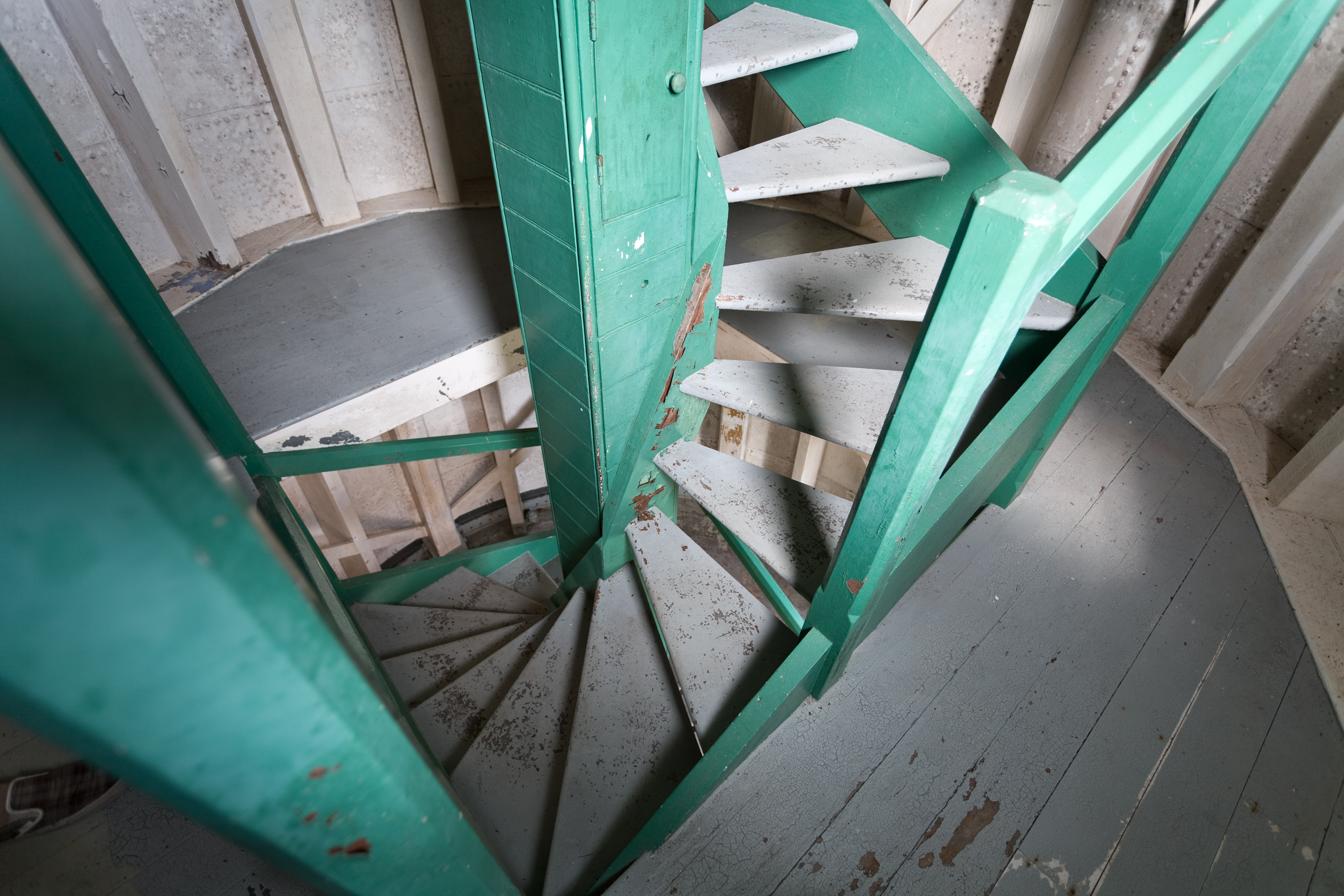
view of the stair from the first floor

The inside of the lighthouse is divided into four storeys with timber floors. A central weight tube provides support to a winding timber stair that goes up to the third level. Access to the fourth level, the gallery and the lantern is via a fixed ladder.

=== Other structures ===
The station also includes three fibro clad cottages and some associated structures. The cottages, set in a row, are located about 50 metres (160 ft) from the lighthouse, as was the practice at the time.

Other structures located around the lighthouse include an old powerhouse, a workshop (which was formerly used as a radio room) a fuel store and a newer powerhouse. These were all used to be in a fenced compound, but the fence was removed sometime in the late 1990s. Other structures in the compound include a boat shed, as well as solar panels and weather recording equipment.

== Site operation and visiting ==
The current lighthouse is operated by the Australian Maritime Safety Authority. The site is managed by the Queensland Parks and Wildlife Service as part of the Great Barrier Reef Marine Park. The island can be reached only by air.

== See also ==
- List of lighthouses in Australia
