= George Poynter Heath =

Royal Navy captain

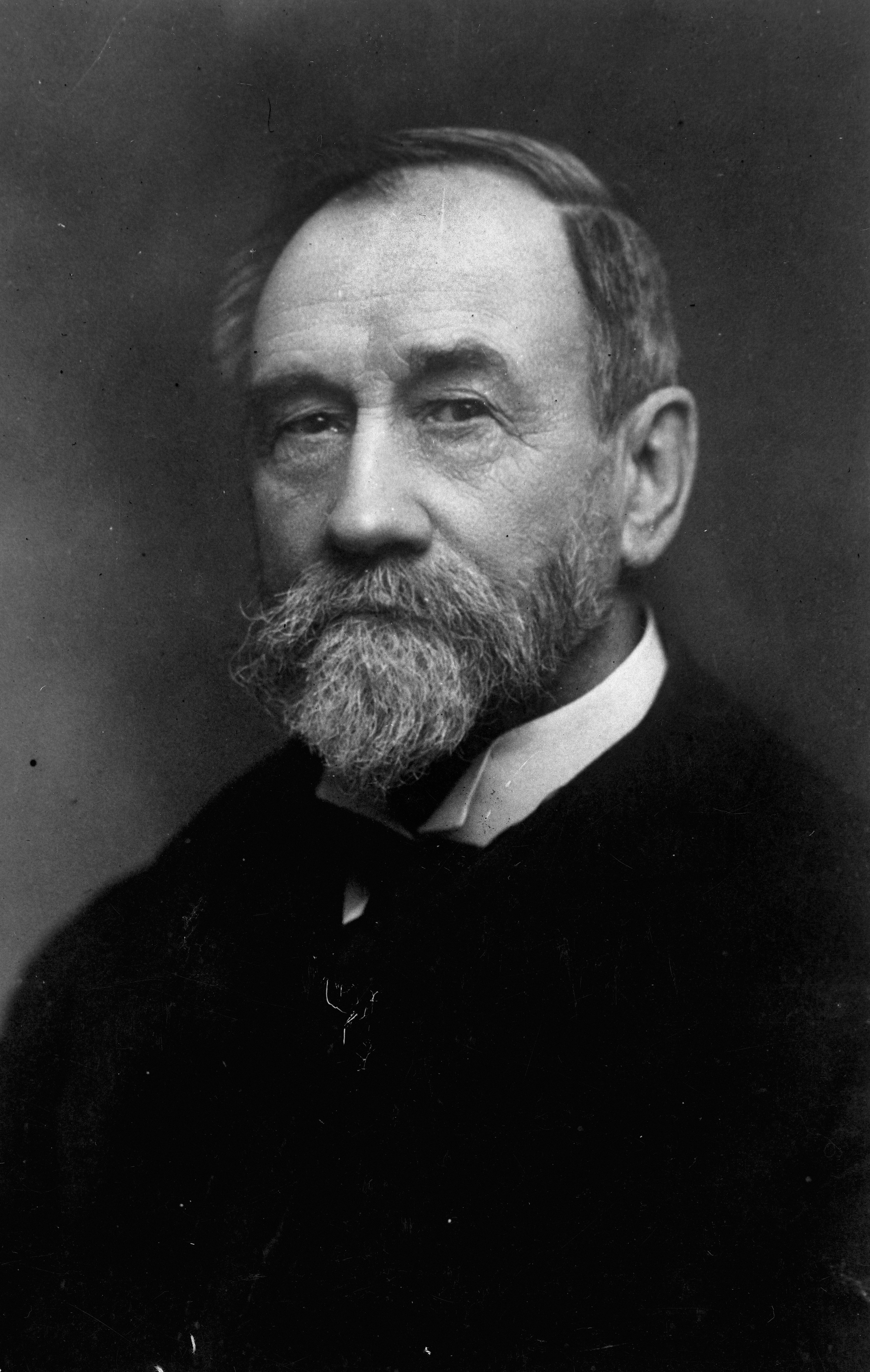
- Born: 19 June 1830; Hanworth, Norfolk, England
- Died: 26 March 1921 (aged 90); South Kensington, London, England
- Known for: first portmaster of Queensland

George Poynter Heath (19 June 1830 – 26 March 1921) was a Royal Navy captain and the first portmaster of Queensland, Australia. It was under his supervision and administration that the 2,086 miles (3,357 km) of coast of Queensland, and its numerous river and creeks, were marked for navigation purposes by means of buoys, beacons, and lights.

== Early life ==
George Poynter Heath was born at Hanworth, Norfolk, England, on 19 June 1830. He was the son of the Rev. Charles Heath, Vicar of Hanworth, and rector of Suffield, and Rural Dean and grandson of the Rev. G. Heath, D.D., headmaster of Eton and Canon of Windsor. He was educated at Cheltenham College. He entered the Royal Navy as a cadet in 1845, and served in the Channel Squadron and on the south coast of South America.

== Australian service ==
Heath first visited Australia while serving on HMS Rattlesnake, when she was engaged in surveying the south-east coast of Australia and of New Guinea from 1846 to 1850 under Owen Stanley. He also served on HMS Fantome, and HMS Calliope. He was also employed by the Sydney Hydrographic office in drawing up charts of the Pacific Ocean.

On his return to England, Heath was employed by the British Admiralty drawing charts of the areas surveyed by the Rattlesnake. In late 1859 he was appointed marine surveyor in the Colony of Queensland, which had just been established. On 23 February 1860, before sailing for Queensland, he married Elizabeth Jane Innes, and they arrived in Brisbane in August 1860.

In 1862, Heath was appointed the first portmaster of Queensland. It was under his supervision and administration that the 2,086 miles (3,357 km) of coast of Queensland were marked for navigation purposes by means of buoys, beacons, and lights. This included establishing 33 lighthouses, 6 lightships and 150 small lights and marking 724 kilometres (450 mi) of the inner route through the Great Barrier Reef.

Heath was an optical expert in the matter of lighthouse work. With the exception of the Cape Moreton lighthouse erected in 1857, Heath selected the sites, and prepared specifications of the appliances required for all lighthouses on the Queensland coast until 1890, when he retired. The last site selected by him was at Booby Island, where Booby Island Light was built, although he did not remain in Queensland to see the completion of this lighthouse.

In 1864 he was involved in surveying Cleveland Bay near Townsville.

In addition to holding the positions of portmaster, he was also a member of the Marine Board, of which he became chairman in 1869. For several years he was a member of the Immigration Board. He retired from the Queensland public service in 1890, being succeeded as portmaster by Captain Almond.

== Later life ==
Heath retired to England in April 1890. He died in South Kensington, London, on 26 March 1921.

== Legacy ==
Heath Point (17.47762°S 146.07639°E) in the Cassowary Coast Region was named after him by explorer George Elphinstone Dalrymple on 14 October 1873.

Heath Reef in the Shire of Cook was named after him.

Heathfield Estate in East Brisbane is named after him.

Heath Bay in the Western Province of Papua New Guinea was named after him by Sir William MacGregor on 2 March 1890.

A number of buildings associated with him are listed on the Queensland Heritage Register:

- Eskgrove, a house he lived in East Brisbane
- Hanworth, a house he built in East Brisbane
- Metro Arts Theatre, originally a warehouse he built
- Numerous lighthouses he commissioned:
  - Booby Island Light
  - Bustard Head Lightstation
  - Caloundra Lighthouses
  - Cape Capricorn Light
  - Cape Cleveland Light
  - Double Island Point Light
  - Grassy Hill Light
  - Sandy Cape Light
  - Woody Island Light
