= Sandy Cape Light =

Lighthouse in Queensland, Australia

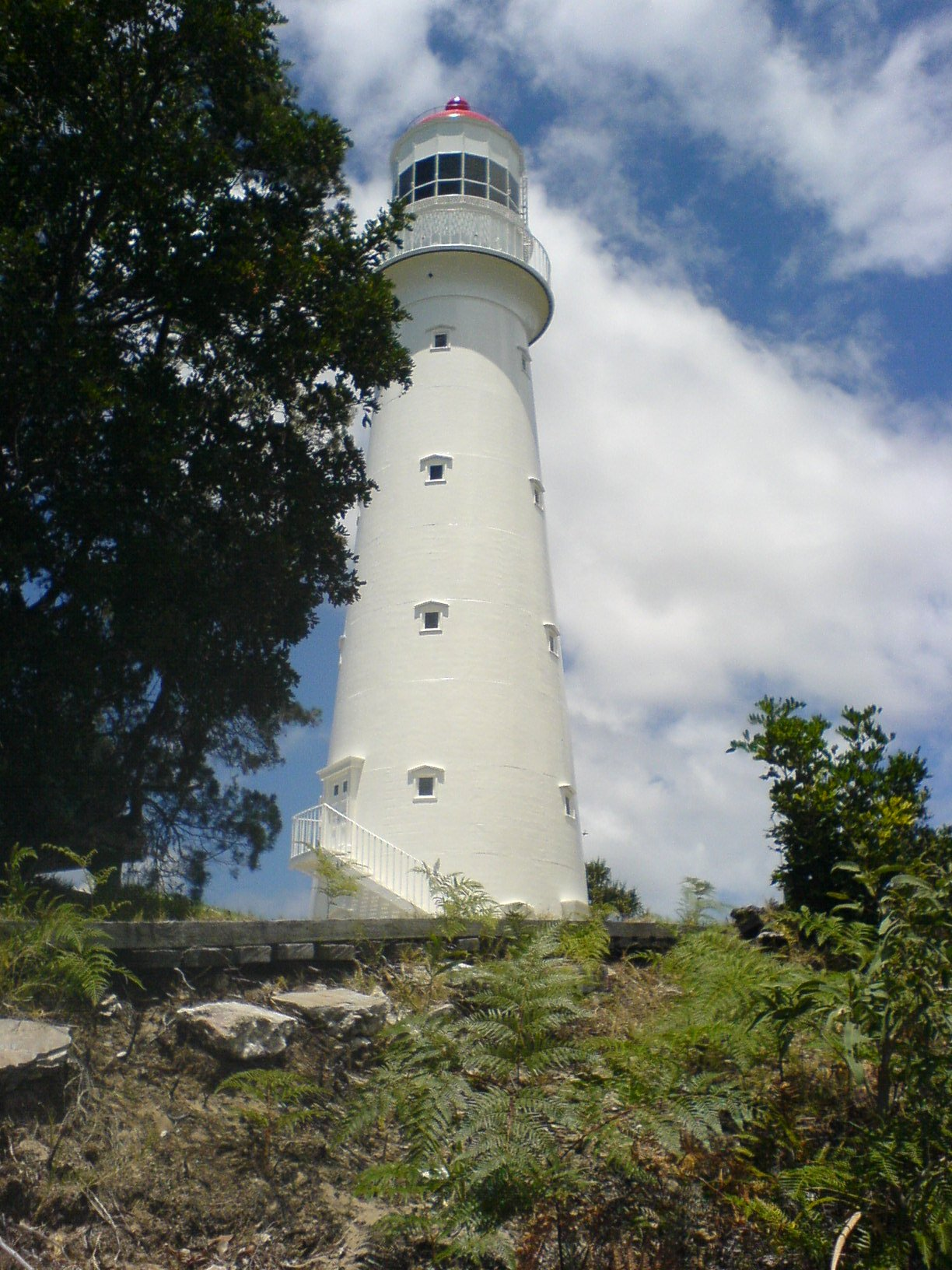
- Sandy Cape Light, 2007
- Location: Sandy Cape; Queensland; Australia
- Coordinates: 24°43′47.9″S 153°12′31.18″E

Tower
- Constructed: 1870
- Foundation: concrete
- Construction: cast iron
- Automated: 1995
- Height: 85 feet (26 m)
- Shape: conical tower with balcony and lantern
- Markings: white tower and lantern, red lantern dome
- Power source: solar power
- Operator: Australian Maritime Safety Authority
- Heritage: listed on the Queensland Heritage Register

Light
- Focal height: 421 feet (128 m)
- Lens: first order Chance Brothers (original), VRB-25 (current)
- Intensity: 160,000 cd
- Range: 21 nautical miles (39 km; 24 mi)
- Characteristic: Fl W 10s.

Sandy Cape Light is a heritage-listed active lighthouse located on Sandy Cape, the most northern point on K'gari, Queensland, Australia. It stands about 6 kilometres (3.7 mi) southwest of the northeastern tip of the island. It is the tallest lighthouse in Queensland. Built in 1870, it is the second major lighthouse to be built in Queensland after its formation in 1859. It is one of the first lighthouses in Australia to be constructed using bolted prefabricated segments of cast iron, and one of only two such lighthouses in Queensland, the other being its sibling, Bustard Head Light.

== History ==
The Government of Queensland was formed in 1859. In 1862, the Queensland government appointed the first Portmaster, Commander George Poynter Heath. However, it was only in 1864 that two committees were appointed to deal with the issue of coastal lighthouses. The only location for which both committees were in clear agreement about the need of a lighthouse was Sandy Cape. The site was also strongly recommended by Joseph Brady, Queensland Engineer for Harbours and Rivers of the time, on a tour of inspection he did in 1865. An order for the prefabricated tower was placed with Kitson & Co. of Leeds, England, the design being done by William Pole of Kitson & Co. The lantern and apparatus were ordered from Chance Brothers of Birmingham, England, and by 1867 all the materials have arrived at Brisbane. The winning tender for the construction of the tower was of £4524 by the brothers John and Jacob Rooney of Maryborough, Sandy Cape Light being the first of several lighthouses they constructed, to be followed by Cape Bowling Green Light, Cowan Cowan Point Light, Cape Capricorn Light, Lady Elliot Island Light and Booby Island Light.

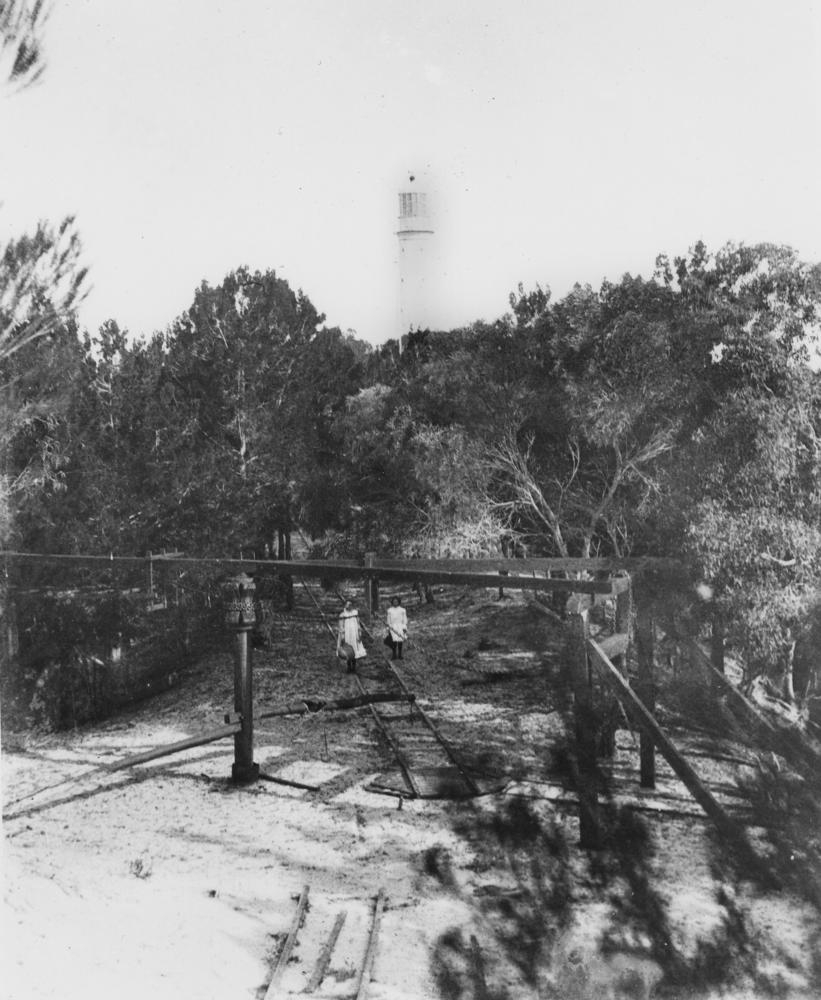
The whim used for pulling materials to the lighthouse, c. 1903

The materials from Brisbane and cement from Sydney were brought by ship, unloaded into barges, and then pulled by horses in trolleys on a 1.2 kilometres (0.75 mi) wooden rail, rising 50 metres (160 ft). Materials were then raised the final 50 metres (160 ft) by a horse-powered whim. It was originally planned that the light will be the first to be constructed by the new Queensland government. However, it was beaten by Bustard Head Light, constructed in 1868. Sandy Cape light was finally officially lit in May 1870.

The original apparatus was a revolving first order Chance Brothers apparatus which showed a light characteristic of one white flash every two minutes, visible for 20 nautical miles (37 km; 23 mi). The light source was an Argand lamp fueled by Colza oil or Rapeseed oil. Rotation was achieved by a clockwork mechanism that had to be wound regularly. Also built in the station were quarters for the head keeper and three assistant keepers, and their families, built of timber-framed weather board and iron roofs.

In 1875, the light source was changed to Kerosene. In 1915, the station was transferred to the Commonwealth. The light was upgraded in 1917 and again in 1923. In one of these upgrades when the light source was converted to an incandescent mantle using vaporised kerosene.

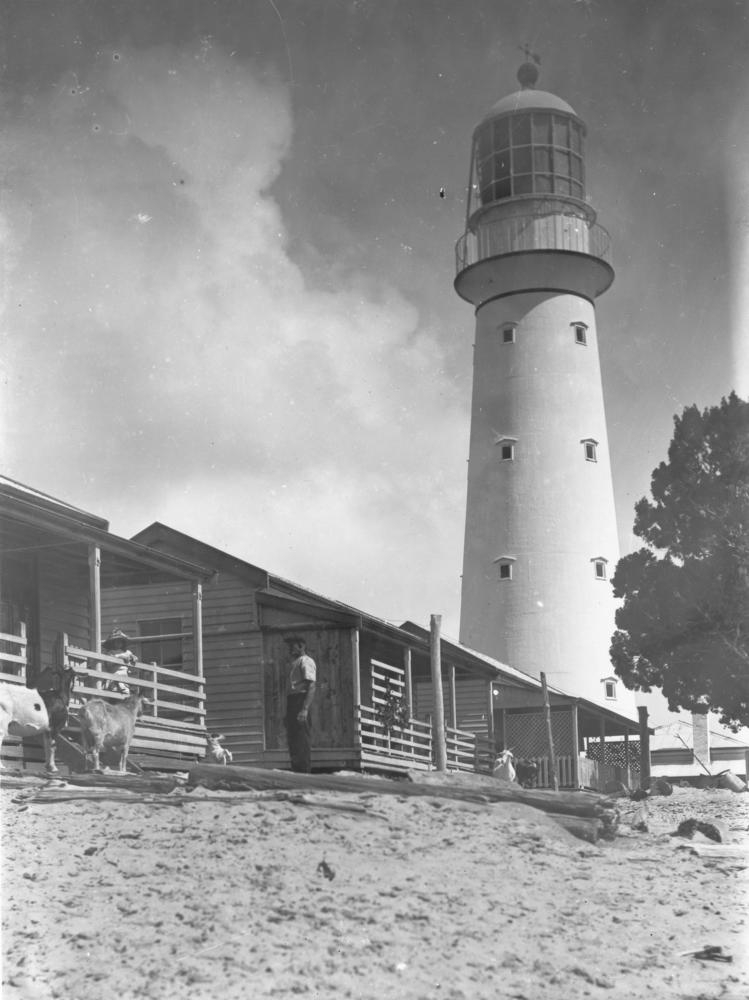
The lighthouse and the original keepers' cottages.

In the 1930s the lens was replaced with a 4th order Chance Brothers lens and the lighthouse was converted to electrical operation. Around that time The keepers' cottages were rebuilt and most of the other buildings at the premises were constructed. Septic tanks were only installed in the 1960s. A boarded roadway was constructed in the 1970s and a brick engine room was built in 1974. The kitchens were renovated in the 1980s.

In 1995, the lighthouse was converted to solar power and automated, and the 4th order lens was replaced with a VRB-25 apparatus. In 1997, the station was finally demanned, and was transferred back to the Queensland Government, to be administered by the Queensland Parks and Wildlife Service, which employs a ranger in the premises. A remote area power supply (RAPS) for powering the quarters was installed in 2001, with both solar and wind power sources and a diesel generator for backup, though the wind turbine is unused since October 2002.

== Current display ==
The current characteristic is one white flash every ten seconds (Fl.W. 10 s), visible for 21 nautical miles (39 km; 24 mi). The light source is a 100 Watt 10 Volt VRB-25 lantern, with an intensity of 160,000 cd. The power source is a photovoltaic system (a battery charged by solar power).

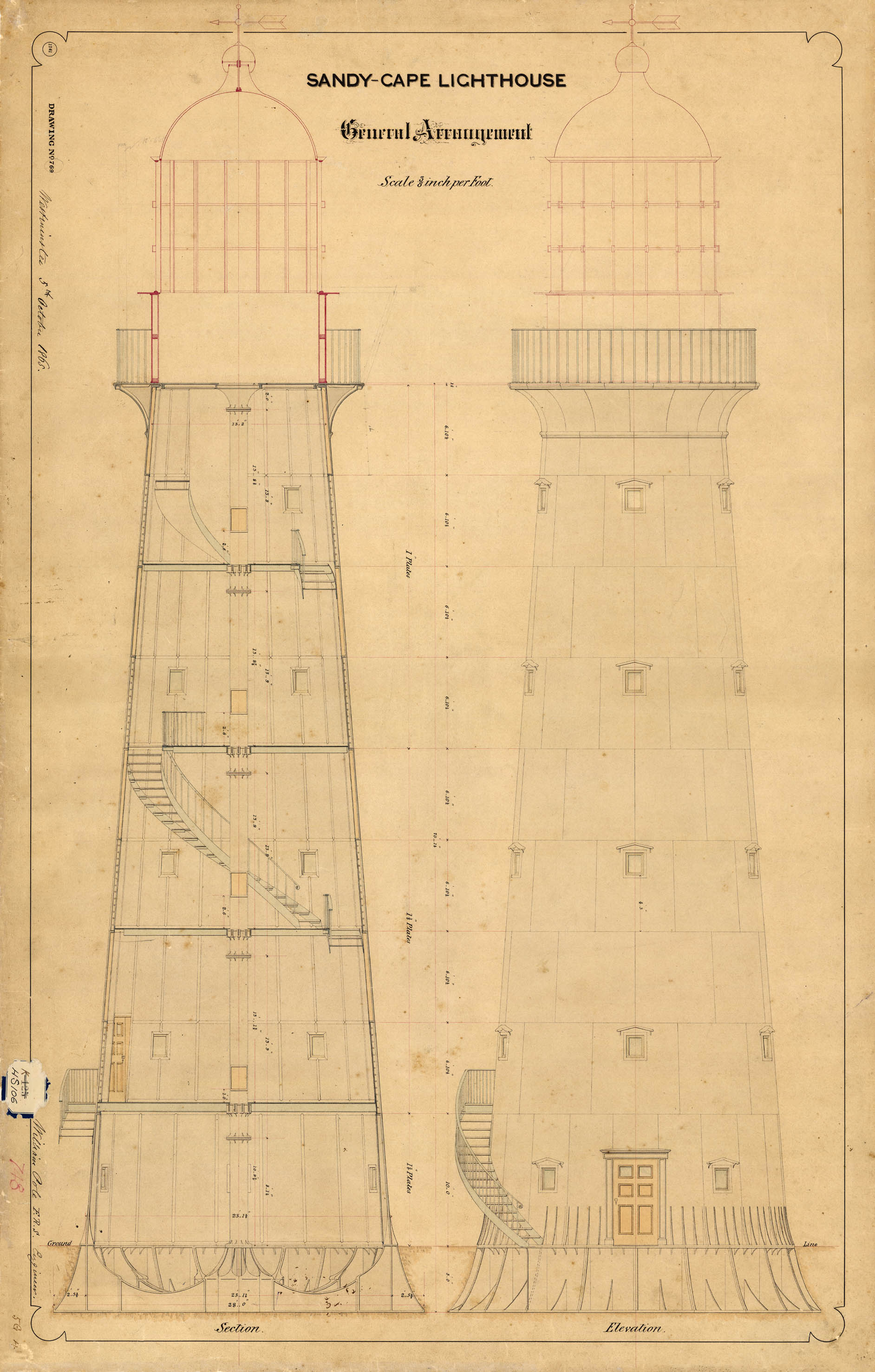
General arrangement of the tower, 1865

== Structures ==
=== The tower ===
The lighthouse is round conical in form, standing 26 metres (85 ft) high. It is constructed of prefabricated cast iron plates, and painted white, with splayed flanges at the base standing on a 4 metres (13 ft) concrete base foundation. The diameter at the base is approximately 7 metres (23 ft), tapering to about 4 metres (13 ft) at the top, below the lantern. Internally it has five floors, connected by a spiral iron staircase with cast iron steps, adjoined to the internal walls. The lighthouse has two entrances, one at the bottom and one about 3 metres (9.8 ft) above the ground, accessible by an outside staircase supported on brackets. The bottom entrance provides access to the ground floor, where a display of various maritime artefacts resides, including the 4th order Chance Brothers lens. The top entrance leads to the main tower. The words ""Kitson & Co LEEDS 1866" are cast above the doorway.

The tower is topped by a cantilevered iron balcony with a simple iron balustrade. On top of the balcony is the lantern room, with a cast iron catwalk supported on ornate iron brackets. The lantern room is constructed of cast iron, topped by a domed roof clad with copper sheeting and painted bright red.

=== Other buildings ===
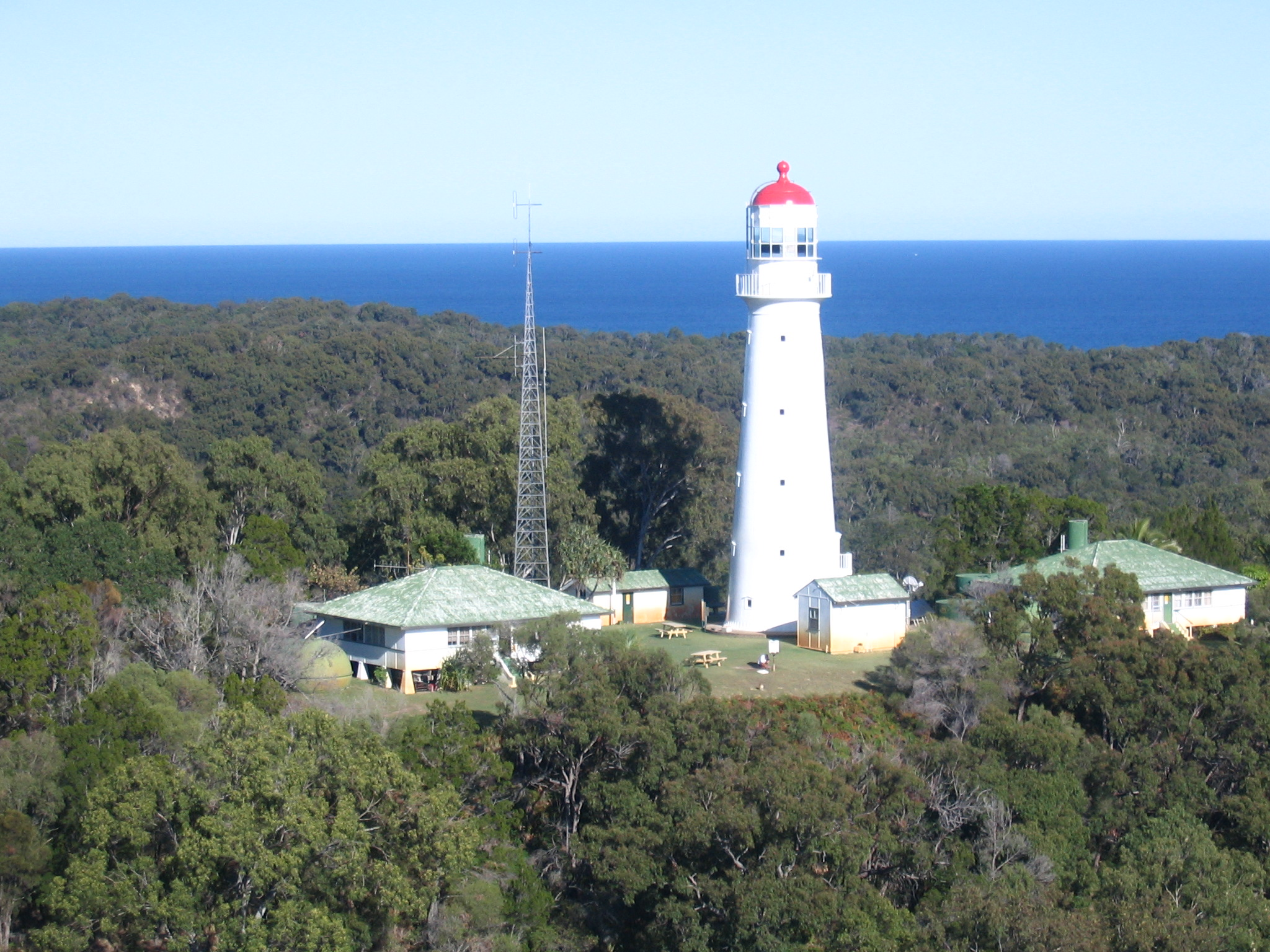
The Sandy Cape Lightstation

A workshop and some other associated structures surround the lighthouse. The residences at the station consist of two one-story lighthouse keeper's houses flanking the lighthouse, one for the head keeper and one for the assistant keeper. They are timber-framed and fibro clad, with timber cover battens and timber door and window frames. Windows have a fixed upper pane with sliding sash below and louvers. Near the residences are a fowl yard and a shelter. A group of service buildings, including a powerhouse, a garage and bulk fuel store are located about 80 metres (260 ft) southeast of the lighthouse. The workshop, office and garage are timber-framed with painted fibre cement and cover battens, and were all built with the residences. The more recent powerhouse and inflammable liquid store are constructed of bricks and have a concrete foundation, a hipped stainless steel roof, with central vent and metal door and window frames.

Also on the premises is a small picket fenced cemetery to the south of the station, with several stone headstones.

== Site operation and visiting ==
The light is operated by the Australian Maritime Safety Authority, while the site is managed by the Queensland Parks and Wildlife Service as part of the Great Sandy National Park. The island can be reached by ferry from Hervey Bay or Inskip Point north of Rainbow Beach, or by chartered flight via Sunshine Coast Airport. The station is accessible either by four-wheel drive or by a long hike.

== Heritage listing ==
The light was listed on the Queensland Heritage Register in 1998.

== See also ==
- List of lighthouses in Australia
