= Pine Islet Light =

Lighthouse in Queensland, Australia

Pine Islet Light (original)
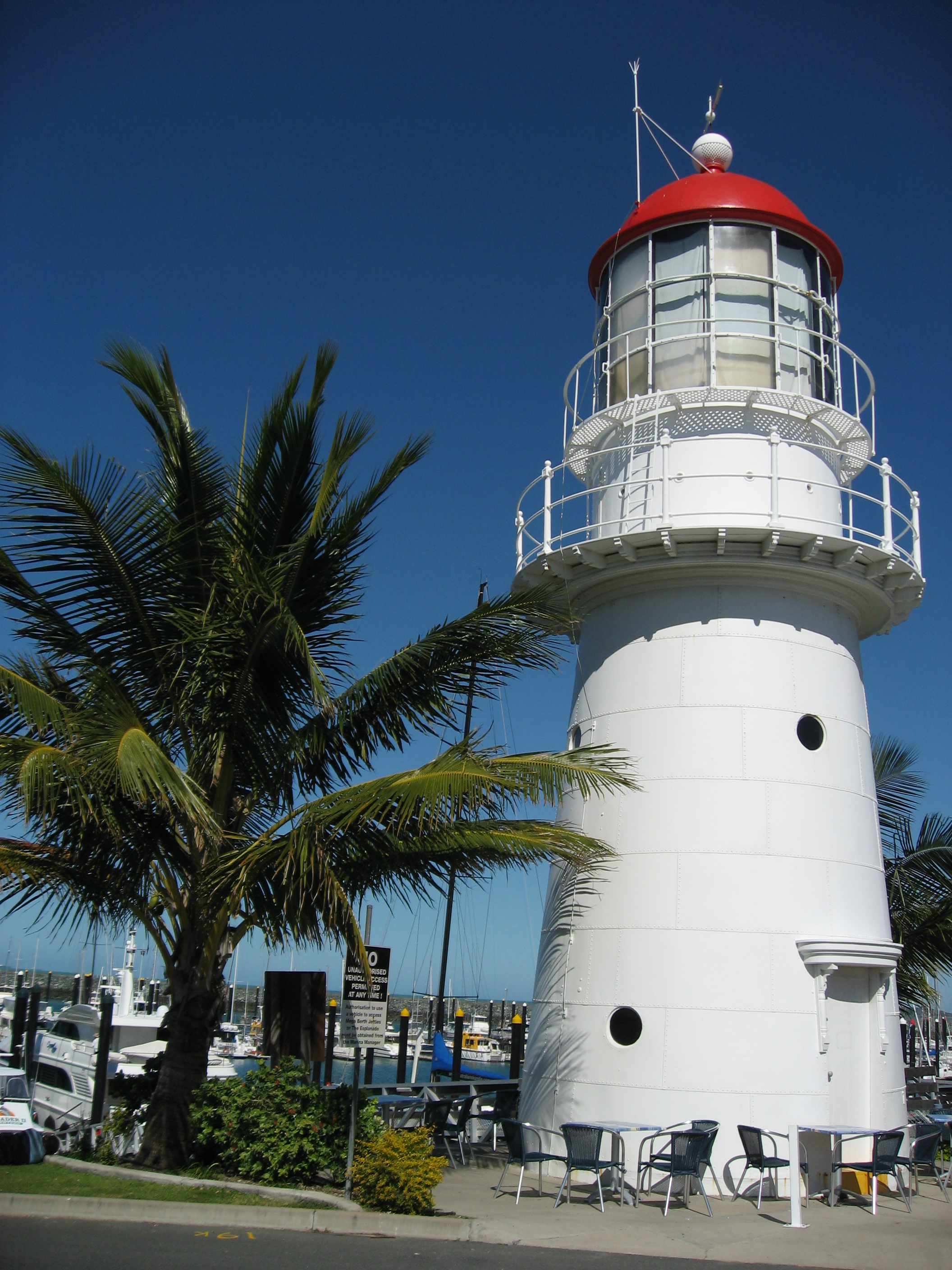
- The original Pine Islet lighthouse, now at Mackay Marina
- Location: Mackay; Queensland; Australia
- Coordinates: 21°06′37.8″S 149°13′29.7″E

Tower
- Constructed: 1885
- Construction: timber frame clad with galvanized iron
- Height: 35 feet (11 m)
- Shape: conical tower with double balcony and lantern
- Markings: white tower, red lantern dome

Light
- Deactivated: 1985
- Range: 20 nautical miles (37 km; 23 mi)

Pine Islet Light, also known as Percy Isles Light, is an active lighthouse located at Pine Islet, a small islet belonging to the Percy Isles group of the Northumberland Islands, about 130 kilometres (81 mi) southeast of Mackay, Queensland, Australia.

The original lighthouse, established 1885, was active for a hundred years, until it was deactivated in 1985, by then the last kerosene powered lighthouse in Australia. It was relocated to the Mackay Marina in 1985 and restored to full working condition, making it the last fully functional kerosene operated lighthouse in the world. At the original location now stands a modern fiberglass tower.

The original light was first proposed in 1881 and again in 1882. Tenders were called in 1883, and the lighthouse was constructed by W. P. Clark in 1885, a typical Queensland lighthouse built of a hardwood frame clad with galvanized iron plates. The light source and the apparatus were upgraded in 1923 and in 1934 respectively. The cottages on Pine Islet were replaced in 1927. The Pine Islet station received electricity in 1950, but the original light remained kerosene operated until it was decommissioned in 1985. Reconstruction of the lighthouse at Mackay, where it stands today, took from 1989 to 1995.

The current lighthouse at Pine Islet is a 20 feet (6.1 m) high fiberglass tower without a lamp, which also serves as a daymark. The light source is a solar powered VRB-25 lamp. The site is not accessible to the public.

== History ==
A lighthouse at Pine Islet was first proposed in a report to the Queensland Parliament on 26 July 1881, by Commander George Poynter Heath, the first Portmaster of Queensland. A second proposal was made by Heath in a report on 18 August 1882. Tenders were called at the end of June 1883 tenders were called, for the construction of lighthouse and lighthouse keeper cottages, for both Pine Islet Light and Double Island Point Light. The contract for both lightstations, for the cost of £6900, was awarded to W. P. Clark, who already constructed Queensland's first lighthouse since Queensland's formation, Bustard Head Light (in 1868), and who was also awarded the contract for Low Isles Light in 1877 and for Cape Cleveland Light and Dent Island Light in 1878.

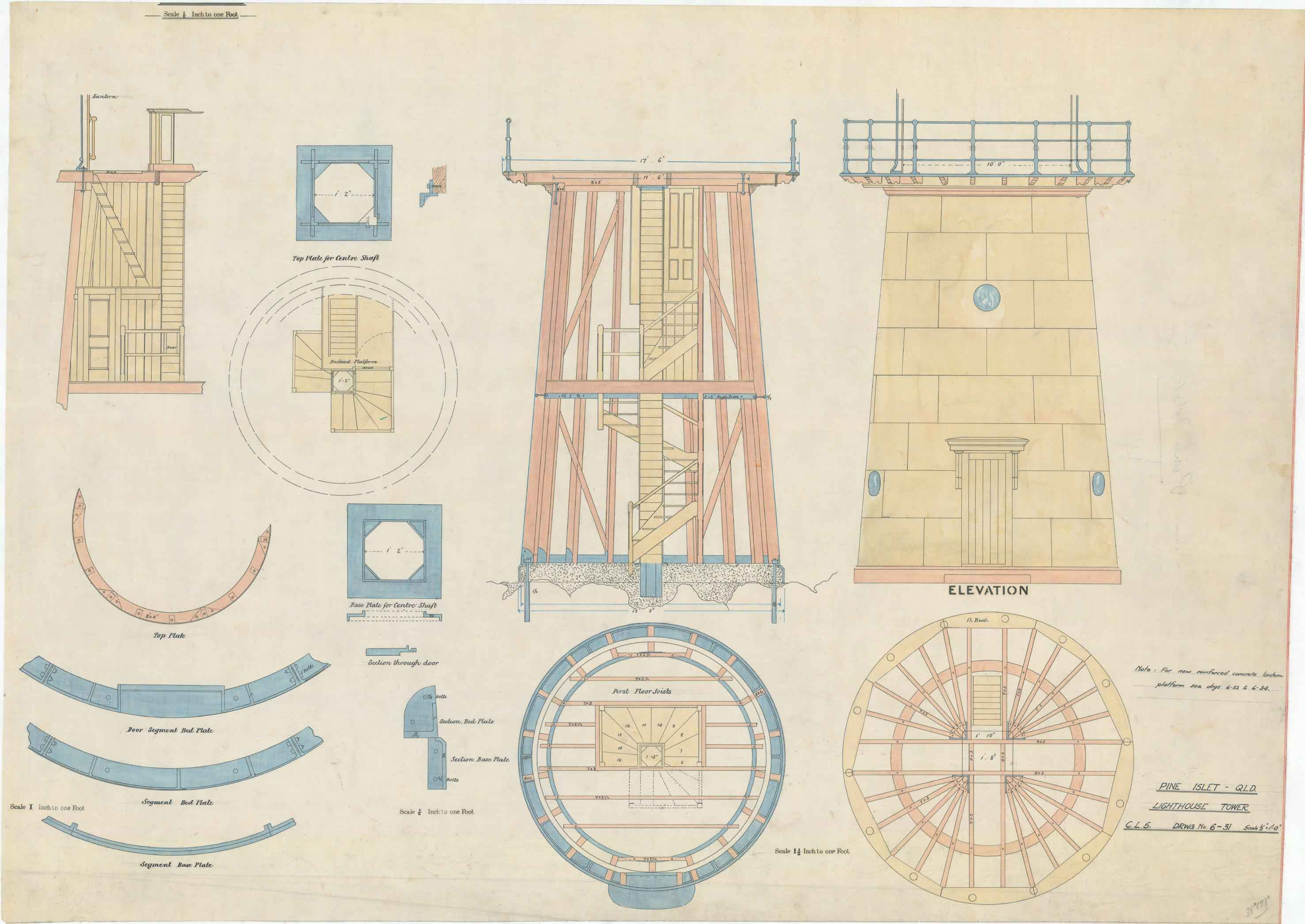
Plans of the lighthouse, drawn 1915

Construction was completed and the lighthouse was exhibited on 18 July 1885. The building was prefabricated and constructed on the islet, built of an internal hardwood frame, clad with riveted galvanized iron plates imported from Britain. It originally had a timber balcony floor. The original apparatus was a second-order revolving lens, having a focal length of 70 millimetres (2.8 in) focal length, with four fixed panels and four flash panels. Its optics were either catadioptric or dioptric. The original lamp was an oil wick burner running on whale or vegetable oil. A red shade was used to mark Normanby Rock, about 1.6 kilometres (0.86 nmi) to the southwest. A 1909 listing lists a visibility range of 20 nautical miles (37 km; 23 mi).

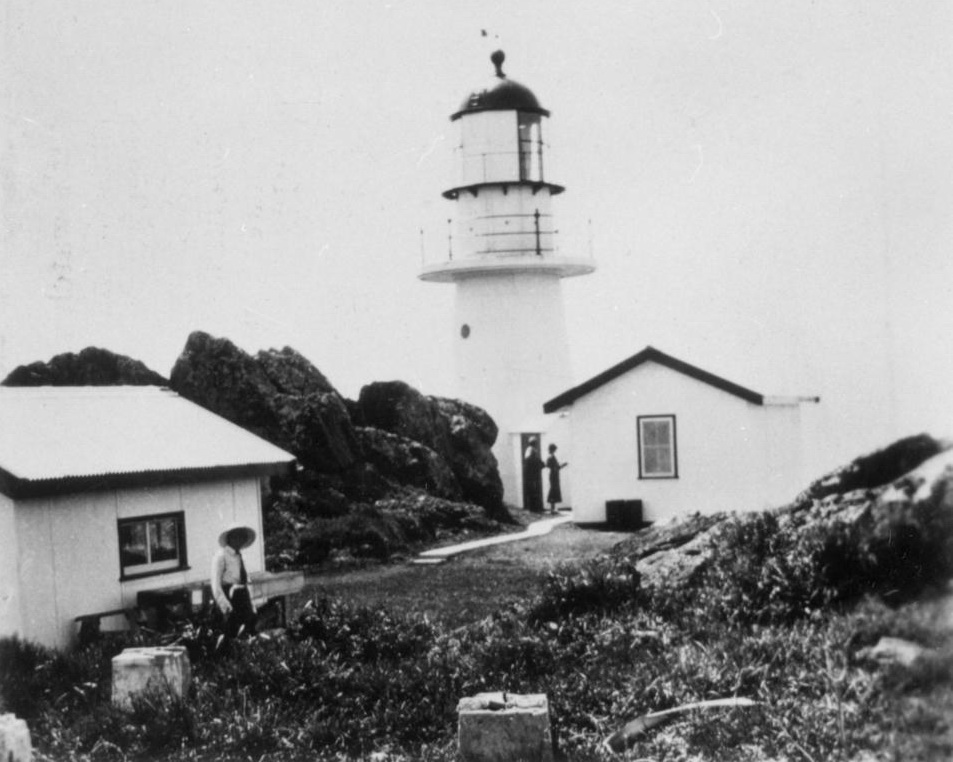
Pine Islet Lightstation, ca. 1935

In 1923, the light was converted to a Chance Brothers 55 millimetres (2.2 in) incandescent gas mantle fuelled by vapourised kerosene. In 1927 the original keepers' cottages were demolished and three timber-framed and fibro clad cottages were constructed. At the same year the tower's floor was replaced with concrete. In 1934 the light was again upgraded, replacing the apparatus with a clockwork driven apparatus from North Reef Light. The height of the lighthouse meant this mechanism had to be wound every two hours. The light was visible for a distance of 21 nautical miles (39 km; 24 mi). In 1950 110 V electricity was installed at the islet and the cottages were electrified, but the light was not converted to electricity. A 240 V system was installed in 1965, again without converting the light.

On 27 August 1985 the lighthouse was decommissioned, to be replaced by a modern fiberglass tower. By then it was the last kerosene power lighthouse in Australia.

The original light and tower was dismantled by the Department of Transport and Communications from 2 October to 12 November 1986. In 1989, after much lobbying, the lighthouse and apparatus were loaned to the Pine Islet Lighthouse Preservation Society for reconstruction at Mackay, mainly by volunteers. Reconstruction started on 18 August 1989 and the lighthouse was restored to fully functional status in late 1995, making it the last operational kerosene light in the world.

In 2004 it was repainted by the Mackay Port Authority.

== Current Lighthouse ==
Pine Islet Light (current)
- Location: Percy Isles, Queensland, Australia
- Coordinates: 21°39′26″S 150°13′03″E

Tower
- Constructed: 1985
- Construction: fiberglass
- Height: 20 ft (6.1 m)
- Shape: cylinder
- Markings: White
- Power source: solar power
- Operator: Australian Maritime Safety Authority

Light
- Focal height: 220 m (720 ft)
- Lens: VRB-25
- Intensity: 63,155 candela
- Range: 18 nmi (33 km; 21 mi)
- Characteristic: Fl W 10s

The current tower is a 20 feet (6.1 m) high fiberglass structure without a lantern, which also acts as a daymark. The current light characteristic is a white flash every ten seconds (Fl.W. 10s) visible at 318°-218°, for a distance of 18 nautical miles (33 km; 21 mi). The apparatus is a solar powered VRB-25 rotating at 1 rpm. The light source is a 12 Volt 35 Watt Halogen lamp with an intensity of 63,155 cd.

Of the other buildings on the station, one keeper's cottage is extant, painted white with a green roof.

== Site Operation and Tours ==
The original lighthouse stands in the Mackay Marina on the waterfront of Mackay Harbor. The site is managed by the Pine Islet Lighthouse Preservation Society Inc (PILPS).

The current lighthouse at Pine Islet is operated by the Australian Maritime Safety Authority. The island is accessible only by boat, and both the site and the tower are closed to the public.

== See also ==
- List of Lighthouses in Australia
- Pine Islet Lighthouse Preservation Society Website
- Facebook Group for Past Keepers and Familes of Pine Islet
