= Bustard Head Light =

Lighthouse in Queensland, Australia

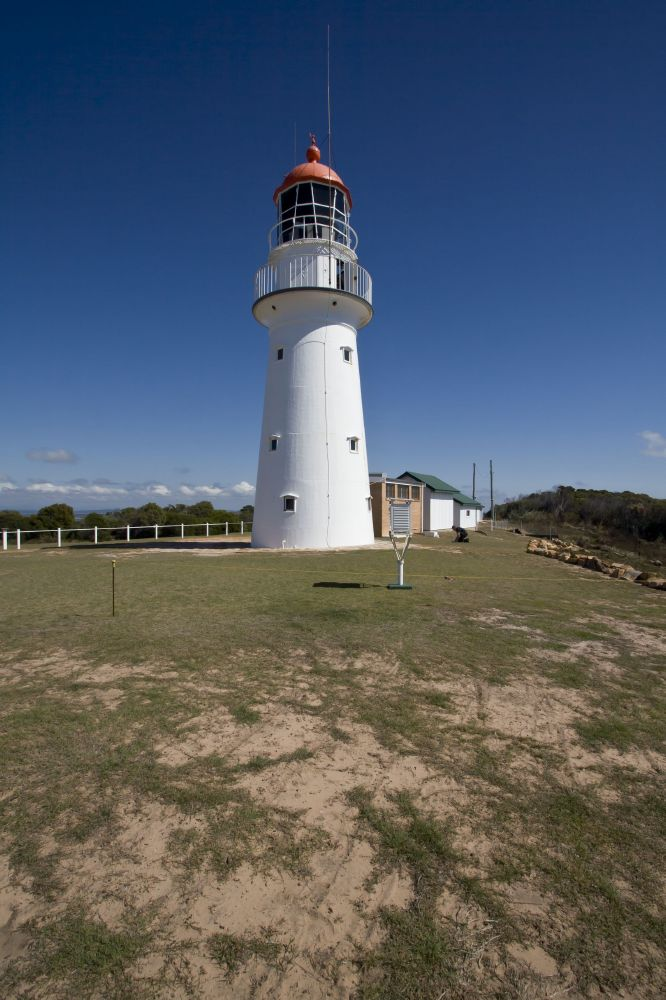
- Bustard Head Light in 2006
- Location: Seventeen Seventy, Gladstone Region, Queensland, Australia
- Coordinates: 24°01′20″S 151°45′52″E

Tower
- Constructed: 1868
- Construction: cast iron tower
- Automated: 1986
- Height: 58 ft (18 m)
- Shape: conical tower with balcony and lantern
- Markings: White (tower), red (dome)
- Power source: mains electricity
- Operator: Australian Maritime Safety Authority
- Heritage: listed on the Queensland Heritage Register

Light
- Focal height: 336 ft (102 m)
- Lens: AGA 250mm rotating lens
- Intensity: 200,000 cd
- Range: 21 nautical miles (39 km; 24 mi)
- Characteristic: Fl(2) W 10s

Bustard Head Light is an active lighthouse located on the southeast tip of Bustard Head, a headland, about 20 kilometres (12 mi) northwest of Seventeen Seventy, in the Australian state of Queensland, within the Eurimbula National Park and locality of Eurimbula. Built in 1868, it is the second-oldest lightstation in the state, following Cape Moreton Light, and the first to be built in Queensland after its formation in 1859. It is also one of the first in Australia to be constructed using bolted prefabricated segments of cast iron, and one of only two such lighthouses in Queensland, the other being its sibling, Sandy Cape Light. It serves as the central relay for Dent Island Light, Pine Islet Light and Lady Elliot Island Light and as the radio check post for Cape Capricorn Light, Sandy Cape Light and Double Island Point Light.

Bustard Head was named by Captain James Cook in 1770, in honour of a bustard which was shot and eaten by the landing party at the location.

== History ==
Lighthouse keeper, M. J. Rooksley in front of the lighthouse and the original cottages, 1902

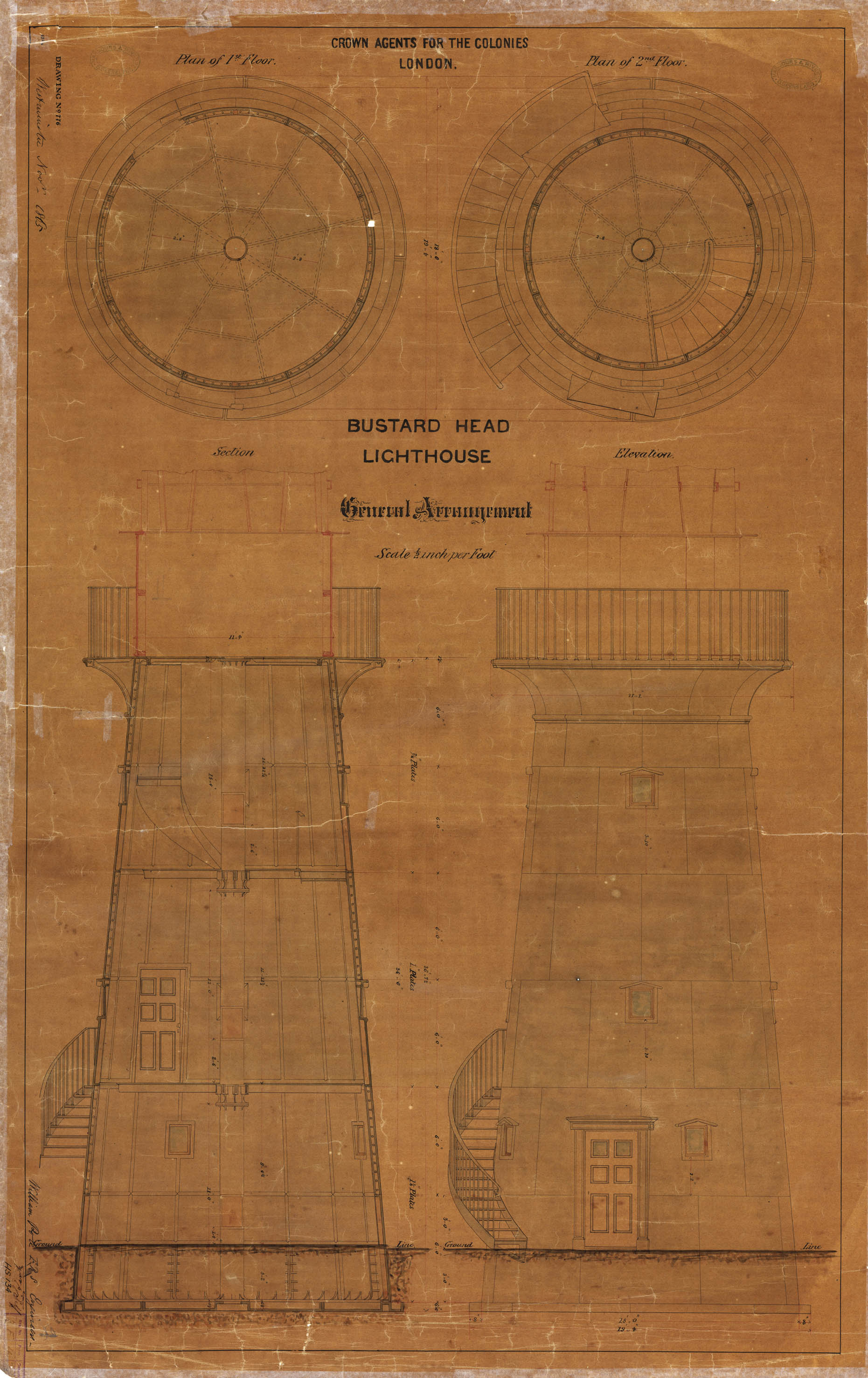
General arrangement of the tower, 1865

The Government of Queensland was formed in 1859. In 1862, the Queensland government appointed the first Portmaster, Commander George Poynter Heath. However, it was only in 1864 that two committees were appointed to deal with the issue of coastal lighthouses. One of the locations believed by these committees to require a lighthouse was Bustard Head. In practice, Bustard head became the first to be constructed by the new government. Orders for the tower and the lantern were placed in 1865, with Hennet, Spinks and Company of Bridgwater, England and Chance Brothers of Birmingham, England, respectively. Both orders shipped to Brisbane in April 1867, and a construction tender was awarded to W. P. Clark in August 1867, for erecting the lighthouse and building the other buildings required for the station. Though the contract stated six months of construction, actual work took ten months, and the light was first lit on 29 June 1868. W. P. Clark was to later construct Double Island Point Light (1884), Pine Islet Light (1885), Low Isles Light (1877) and to start the construction of Cape Cleveland Light and Dent Island Light (1878).

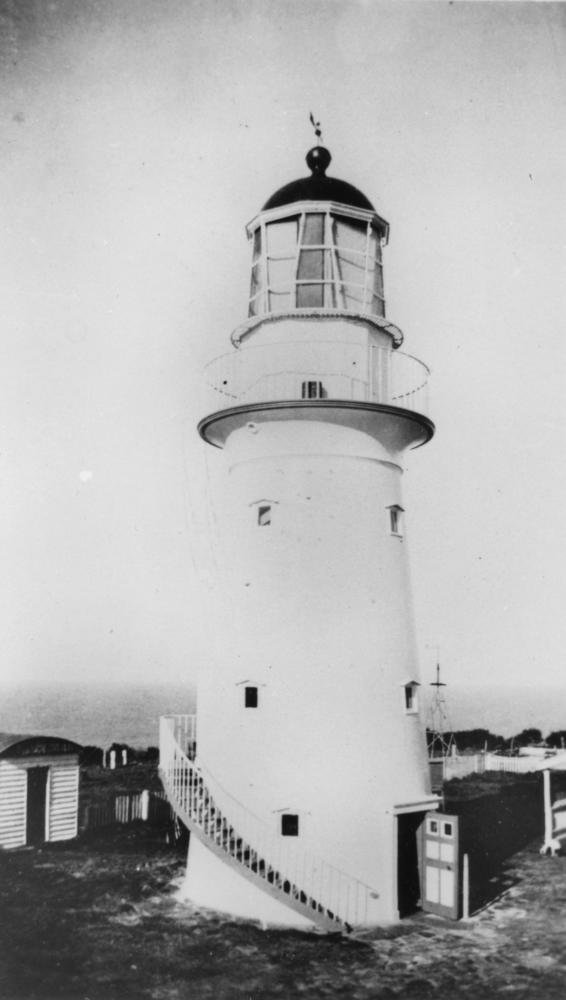
Bustard Head Light, 1932

In May 1932 the original cottages were destroyed in fire. In 1935 the stairs which were originally outside the tower were relocated within the tower. The lighthouse was automated during 1985–86 and no longer staffed by 1986, leaving it to neglect and vandalism for the next 16 years. In 2001 the Bustard Head Lighthouse Association, a volunteer organisation led by Stuart Buchanan, obtained a twenty-year lease on the premises and started restoring it using funds from a federal grant, local businesses and self-funding. The station was fully restored, and it is now managed by the association.

== Current display ==
The current light characteristic is two white flashes, separated by three seconds, every ten seconds (Fl.(2)W. 10s), visible for 21 nautical miles (39 km; 24 mi). The light source is a 1000 Watt 120 Volt tungsten-halogen lamp, with an intensity of 200,000 cd. The light is fed by Mains electricity, with a standby diesel alternator. The current optical apparatus is an AGA 250-millimetre (9.8 in) rotating lens.

== Structures ==
The lighthouse is conical in form. It stands 18 metres (59 ft) high, constructed of prefabricated cast iron plates, and painted white, with splayed flanges at the base, much like the Sandy Cape Light. The tower is topped by a cantilevered iron gallery, with a simple iron balustrade. Inside the tower is a spiral iron staircase with cast iron steps, adjoined to the internal walls. Entrance to the lighthouse was originally via an external flight of stairs and a small landing leading to a door on the second floor. In 1935 and entrance was provided on the ground floor and the stairs were relocated within the tower. On top of the gallery is the original 9-foot-6-inch (2.90 m) diameter Chance Bros lantern. In the lantern room is a catwalk, supported by ornate iron brackets. The dome of the lantern is copper clad and painted red, and itself topped with a spherical knob and a weather vane. The lighthouse is fenced.

The residences at the station consist of two one-storey lighthouse keeper's houses. They are timber framed, clad with fibro and with corrugated fibro roofs, with stainless-steel gutters. One of them is occupied by a site manager and the other serves as a display with lighthouse artefacts.

Another notable structure at the station is an old powerhouse, timber-framed and clad with cement sheet and a gabled corrugated fibro cement roof with stainless-steel gutters. The new powerhouse is brick constructed on a concrete foundation.

Other structures include a fenced fuel store, a tool shed, a garage/stores shed, and a bulk fuel farm. They are mostly timber-framed and clad with fibro.

Also on the premises is a cemetery surrounded by a white picket fence, located about 300 metres (980 ft) northeast of the station. It contains nine graves dating from 1879 to 1911 as well as two unmarked, child-sized graves.

== Site operation and visiting ==
The light is operated by the Australian Maritime Safety Authority. The site is managed by the Bustard Head Lighthouse Association. The site is accessible by boat only. The site and tower are open to tours which are available daily.

== See also ==
- List of lighthouses in Australia
