= Double Island Point =

Point in Queensland, Australia

Coordinates: 25°56′S 153°11′E

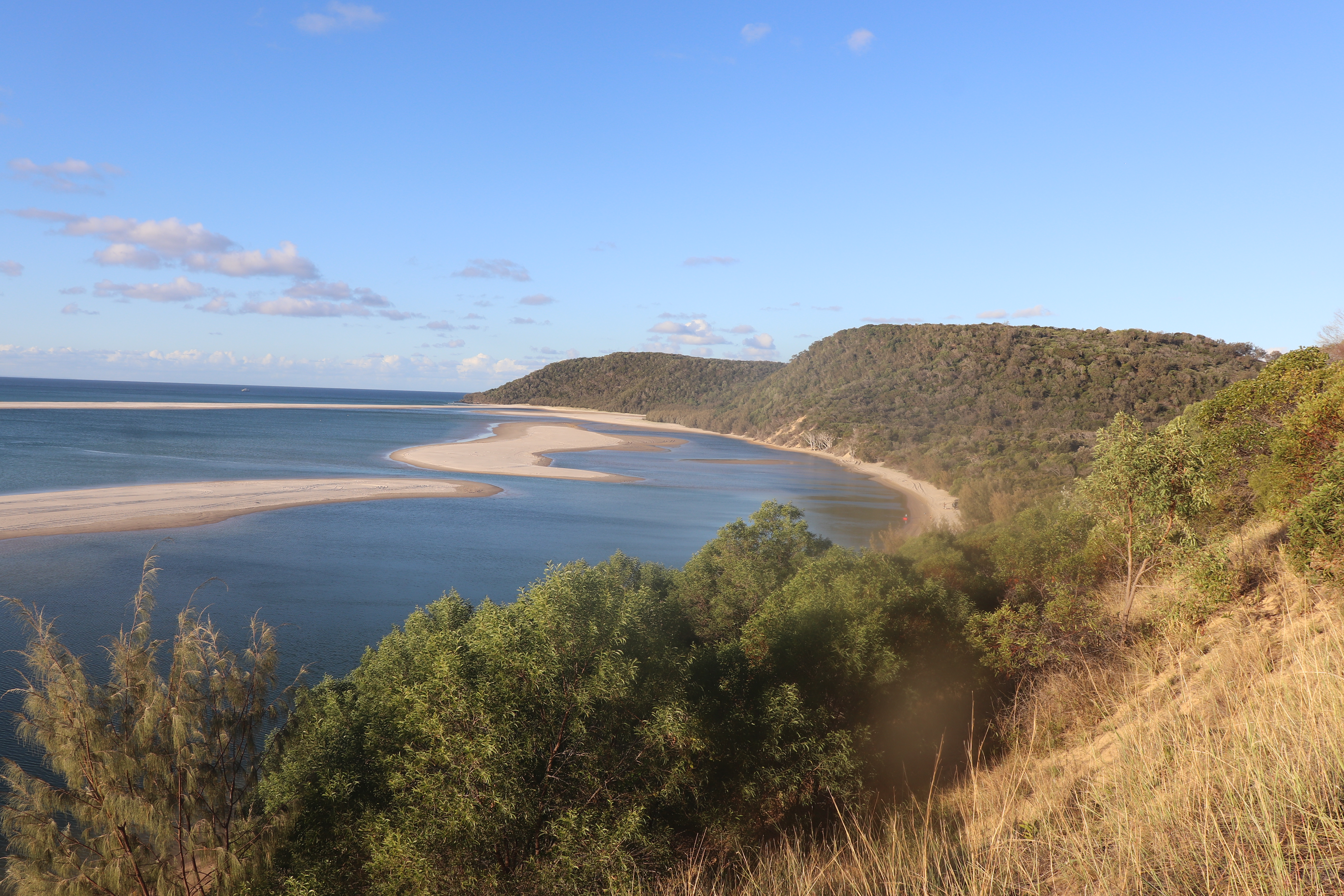
Double Island Point, 2019

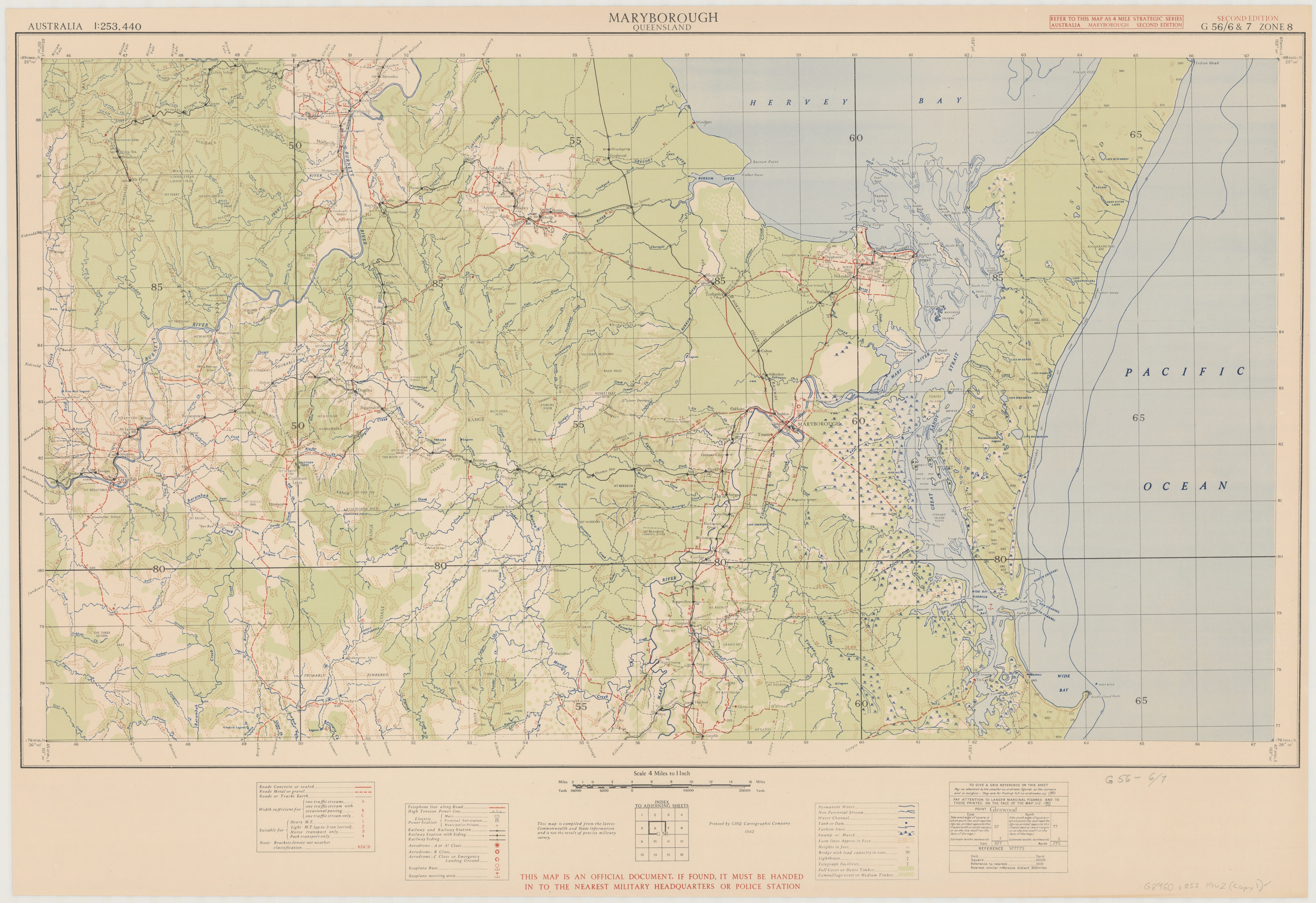
Double Island Point in the lower part of a 1942 topographic map

Double Island Point is a coastal headland in Queensland, Australia. It is the next headland north of Noosa and is within the Cooloola section of the Great Sandy National Park, at the southern end of Wide Bay. It is approximately 12 km south along the beach from the tourist township of Rainbow Beach.

== History ==
The Kabi Kabi people have lived, hunted and fished in this area for tens of thousands of years. The site had obvious cultural significance and was used as a burial site by local indigenous people. The point was named by Lieutenant James Cook when his vessel passed it on 18 May 1770, "on account of its figure" (i.e. shape). He had originally written Fiddle Head in his journal, but crossed that out.

== Geography ==
Despite the name, there is no double island, but rather a sandspit. It is the southern point of Wide Bay. Wolf Rock is a set of four volcanic pinnacles off Double Island Point.

There is no road access to the point, but four-wheel drive vehicles can go along the beach, either south from the township of Rainbow Beach in Wide Bay, or the longer way north from Noosa Heads (after taking a ferry across the Noosa River).

The northern side of the point is a surfing location. When there is a good swell, a right-hander breaks over sand, and for perhaps as much as 300 metres in ideal conditions.

=== Climate ===
Double Island Point has a humid subtropical climate (Köppen: Cfa) with hot, rainy summers and very mild, relatively dry winters. Being an island, conditions are windy year round, as 100 km/h wind gusts have been recorded in all months of the year.

On 16 December 2006, the Bureau of Meteorology weather station at the Double Island Point Lighthouse recorded a wind gust of 196 km/h (122 mph), which accompanied a severe supercell thunderstorm. It was the highest non-tornadic wind gust ever recorded from a thunderstorm in Australia, and was equivalent to winds in a category 3 tropical cyclone.

Climate data for Double Island Point Lighthouse (25º56'S, 153º11'E, 96 m AMSL) (1938–2024 normals and extremes)
Month	Jan	Feb	Mar	Apr	May	Jun	Jul	Aug	Sep	Oct	Nov	Dec	Year
Record high °C (°F)	36.2 (97.2)	35.9 (96.6)	33.7 (92.7)	32.4 (90.3)	29.5 (85.1)	27.8 (82.0)	26.6 (79.9)	28.6 (83.5)	31.4 (88.5)	33.9 (93.0)	34.4 (93.9)	37.3 (99.1)	37.3 (99.1)
Mean daily maximum °C (°F)	28.0 (82.4)	27.8 (82.0)	26.9 (80.4)	25.0 (77.0)	22.4 (72.3)	20.2 (68.4)	19.7 (67.5)	20.8 (69.4)	22.8 (73.0)	24.7 (76.5)	26.2 (79.2)	27.5 (81.5)	24.3 (75.8)
Mean daily minimum °C (°F)	22.5 (72.5)	22.6 (72.7)	21.9 (71.4)	19.9 (67.8)	17.4 (63.3)	15.1 (59.2)	14.2 (57.6)	14.8 (58.6)	16.7 (62.1)	18.6 (65.5)	20.2 (68.4)	21.6 (70.9)	18.8 (65.8)
Record low °C (°F)	14.2 (57.6)	12.2 (54.0)	10.6 (51.1)	8.9 (48.0)	6.4 (43.5)	3.1 (37.6)	6.1 (43.0)	1.1 (34.0)	8.0 (46.4)	8.9 (48.0)	10.0 (50.0)	10.0 (50.0)	1.1 (34.0)
Average precipitation mm (inches)	158.3 (6.23)	162.5 (6.40)	160.6 (6.32)	124.6 (4.91)	144.4 (5.69)	114.3 (4.50)	82.5 (3.25)	61.3 (2.41)	49.5 (1.95)	72.4 (2.85)	86.5 (3.41)	125.2 (4.93)	1,342.1 (52.84)
Average precipitation days (≥ 1 mm)	10.1	11.1	12.7	12.0	11.9	9.6	7.9	6.7	5.9	7.1	7.2	9.0	111.2
Average afternoon relative humidity (%)	74	76	75	73	71	69	67	64	66	69	71	73	71
Average dew point °C (°F)	20.8 (69.4)	21.0 (69.8)	19.9 (67.8)	17.8 (64.0)	15.1 (59.2)	12.5 (54.5)	11.1 (52.0)	11.5 (52.7)	13.8 (56.8)	16.1 (61.0)	18.0 (64.4)	19.9 (67.8)	16.5 (61.6)
Source: Bureau of Meteorology

== Heritage listings ==
Double Island Point has a number of heritage-listed sites, including:

- Double Island Point: Double Island Point Light

== Lighthouse ==
In 1884, a lighthouse was built on the point. It constructed of timber with metal cladding, as are many lighthouses in Queensland, because it is cheaper than masonry but also better suited for soft, sandy soils. The lighthouse was planned to be built only halfway up the point, but it was realised the light wouldn't be visible to the north, so the tower was built on top of the point. The lantern initially burned oil, and was converted to vaporised kerosene in 1923. Later, it was converted to electric power. In 1992, it was converted to solar power and destaffed. The light characteristic is a single flash every 7.5 seconds, and the focal plane is located 96 metres above sea level.

== See also ==
- Wolf Rock, just off the point
- Teewah Beach, stretches south from Double Island Point
- Rainbow Beach, stretches west from Double Island Point before turning north
