= Low Isles Light =

Lighthouse in Queensland, Australia

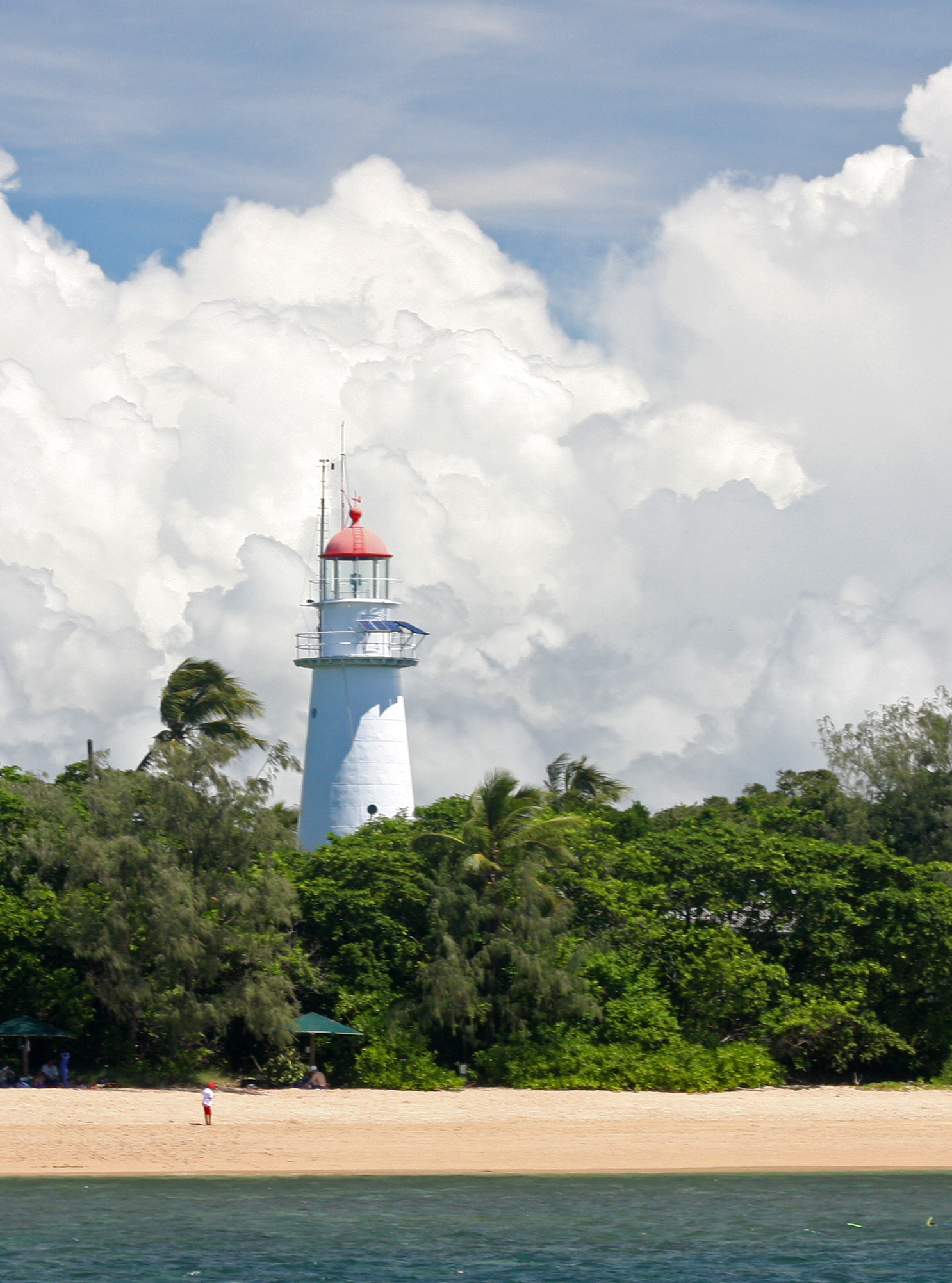
- Low Isles Light, 2008
- Location: Low Island; Queensland; Australia
- Coordinates: 16°23′02.6″S 145°33′35.3″E

Tower
- Constructed: 1874
- Foundation: concrete tower
- Construction: timber frame clad with galvanized iron
- Automated: 1993
- Height: 60 feet (18 m)
- Shape: conical tower with balcony and lantern
- Markings: white tower, red lantern dome
- Power source: solar power
- Operator: Australian Maritime Safety Authority
- Heritage: listed on the Commonwealth Heritage List

Light
- First lit: 1878
- Focal height: 65 feet (20 m)
- Lens: Chance Brothers 3rd order (500 mm) dioptric (original), VRB-25 (current)
- Intensity: 49,212 cd
- Range: 17 nautical miles (31 km; 20 mi)
- Characteristic: Fl W 10s.

Low Isles Light, also known as Low Islets Light or Low Island Light, is an active lighthouse located on Low Island, a coral cay which together with Woody Island forms the Low Isles group, about 13 kilometres (8.1 mi) northeast of Port Douglas, Queensland, Australia. The island is situated on the western edge of the main shipping channel into the harbour of Port Douglas, and it marks the entrance to the channel. Built in 1878, it was the first lighthouse in Far North Queensland and more specifically the first to light the Inner Passage of the Great Barrier Reef. Its construction is typical to Queensland lighthouses of the time, timber frame clad with galvanized iron, and it is the fourth lighthouse of this type constructed in Queensland, though it is the first of them to use portholes.

The lighthouse was recommended in February 1876 but construction of the lighthouse and cottages, by W. P. Clark, started more than a year later. The structures were ready and the light was lit in late 1878. The original oil wick light was upgraded to kerosene in 1923, to electricity in 1963 and finally converted to solar power in 1993, when the station was demanned.

The size of the island mandated a rather compact circular pattern of structures. Other than the lighthouse, none of the original structures survived, the keeper residences being rebuilt in the 1960s. One of the residences now serves as a research station. The station is owned and managed by the Queensland Parks and Wildlife Service. The site can be visited but the tower is closed.

== History ==
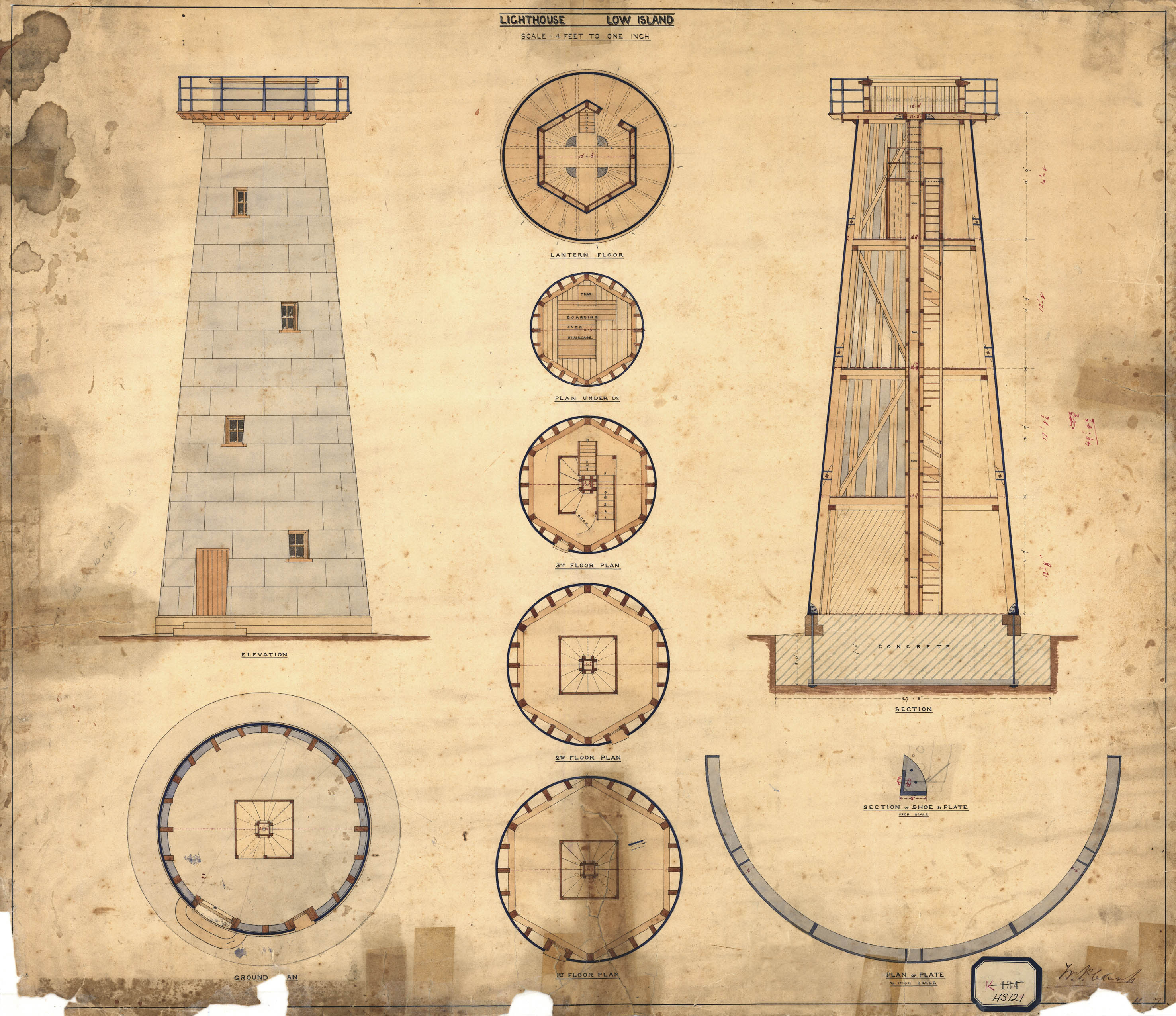
Plans for the lighthouse, signed by W. P. Clark

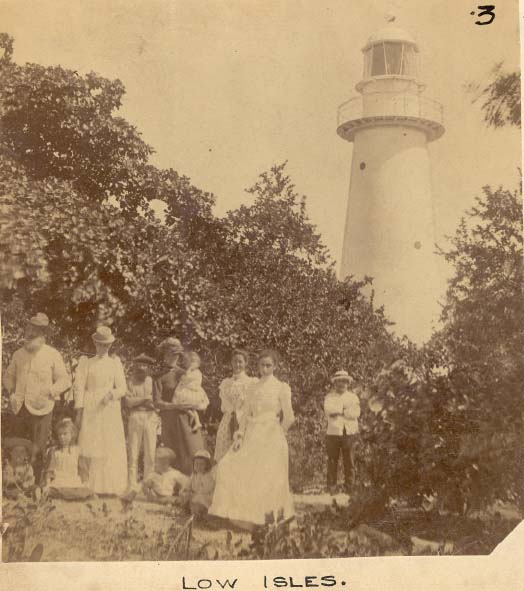
An historical view of the lighthouse

The need for lights in the Inner Passage inside the Great Barrier Reef arose with the development of ports in the north of Queensland such as Mackay in 1860 and Bowen in 1864. Access to these ports from the north necessitates the negotiation of the Inner Passage which was completely unlit. The need was officially noted by a Legislative Council committee in 1864, especially noting shipping from India, China and other countries to the north which would avoid the northern ports due to the dangerous navigation required, but no official recommendation was made.

A station on Low Island was established 1874. A recommendation for the construction of a permanent lighthouse was made in February 1876 by Commander George Poynter Heath, the first Portmaster of Queensland and the Chairman of the Queensland Marine Board, Commander George Heath, in a letter to the Colonial Treasurer. While the recommendation was accepted for immediate action, the preparation of plans for the lighthouse was delayed from an unknown reason and tenders were called in March 1877. The contract, for £3,195, was awarded in May 1877 to W. P. Clark, who already constructed Queensland's first lighthouse since the separation, Bustard Head Light, in 1868, and who was later to be awarded the contracts for Cape Cleveland Light and Dent Island Light (1878), Double Island Point Light (1884) and Pine Islet Light (1885). Clark committed to completing the lighthouse and cottages in seven months, starting in June 1877. Constructed commenced in Brisbane in July 1877 and by December 1877 the lighthouse was being moved to Low Island. Construction completed by August of that year and light was finally displayed on 17 September 1878. The lens was a Chance Brothers 3rd order (500 mm focal length) revolving dioptric supported by a roller bearing pedestal and the characteristic mentioned was "attains its greatest brilliancy every minute", with visibility of 14 nautical miles (26 km; 16 mi). The tower was painted white. The original light source was oil wick burners with an intensity of 13,000 cd. Construction also included three lighthouse keeper cottages, which were also prefabricated elsewhere and brought to the site.

In March 1911 the island was hit by a cyclone, stripping it of soil and vegetation, and damaging the station buildings. As preparation for transferring the light from the Queensland Government to the Commonwealth Lighthouse Service, an evaluation was made by Commander Brewis in 1912, which recommended an upgrade of the light to incandescent mantle and a change of the characteristic to one flash every ten seconds, as well as the installation of a fog signal. The station was transferred to the Commonwealth in 1915, and it was only in 1923 that the recommendation was acted upon, and the light source was upgraded to vapourised kerosene with an intensity of 100,000 cd. At the same time, the characteristic was altered, and again in 1930.

In 1960 two of the three residences were replaced with modern structures. Upgrade to electric operation occurred in 1963 and in the same year three structures were constructed. The original boathouse, constructed in 1920, was replaced with a new structure, relieving quarters were built and a fuel store was constructed. In 1972 a powerhouse and a bulk fuel store were constructed.

In 1992 the Australian Maritime Safety Authority (AMSA) announced its plans to automate the station, remove the light keepers, and transfer the island to the responsibility of the Queensland Parks and Wildlife Service (QPWS). This prompted the foundation of the Low Isles Preservation Society, a community organization with the purpose of protecting the island and the lighthouse. The light was eventually converted to solar power in March 1993, and as planned the station was demanned and the site was transferred to the QPWS. The lens which was removed at the time is now on display in the Court House Museum of Port Douglas. The last keeper left the island in 1994.

== Current display ==
The current light characteristic is a white flash every ten seconds (Fl.W. 10s) visible for a distance of 17 nautical miles (31 km; 20 mi). The apparatus is a VRB-25 rotating at 1 rpm. The light source is a 12 Volt 20 Watt Halogen lamp with an intensity of 49,212 cd.

== Structures ==
=== Lighthouse ===
The tower stands on a concrete base. It is conical in shape, built of an internal timber frame, clad with galvanized iron plates riveted together, and painted white. Sunlight is provided through portholes and access to the top floor is via a square timber staircase surrounding the central weight tube. The intermediate landings are of metal clad wood. The tower is surmounted by a balcony and Chance Brothers 8 feet 1 inch (2.46 m) diameter lantern room, housing a VRB-25 lantern. The balcony is made of radial cantilevered timber sections and is surrounded by an iron balustrade.

=== Other structures ===
The size of the island mandated a compact arrangement of the structures, in a radial pattern with the lighthouse as the axis including both living quarters and service structures. The structures include two keeper's cottages, originally one for the head keeper and one for the assistant keeper, relieving quarters, an older and a newer powerhouses, an old fuel store and a newer bulk fuel store, a boat house and a toilet block. The station also includes a grave site, some tank, a landing for amphibious vehicles and some weather recording equipment. All structures are timber-framed and fibro clad except for the 1972 powerhouse which is brick constructed.

The cottages, constructed in the early 1960s, are raised on concrete posts, and the area beneath is used for utility purposes. Access is through aluminium stairs constructed in 1987. They have hipped roofs of fibro cement and stainless steel gutters. The cottage formerly housing the assistant keeper now serves as the Low Isles Research Station. It includes a laboratory under the house and can accommodate six people.

== Site operation and visiting ==
The light is operated by the AMSA. The site is owned and operated by the QPWS as part of the Great Barrier Reef Marine Park. The island is accessible only by boat, and day tours to Low Isles are available from Cairns and Port Douglas. The station is open to the public but the tower itself is closed.

The original 1878 lens is on display in the Court House Museum of Port Douglas.

== See also ==
- List of lighthouses in Australia
