= Tideland Signal =

Manufacturer of marine navigational aids

- Company type: Private
- Founded: 1954
- Headquarters: Houston, Texas, United States
- Key people: Matt Scheuing (CEO)
- Products: Navigational aids
- Website: www.tidelandsignal.com

Tideland Signal, sometimes referred to as Tidelands, was a privately held, Houston, Texas based manufacturer of marine navigational aids, with main offices in Lafayette, Louisiana, Vancouver, British Columbia, Canada, Burgess Hill, UK, Dubai, United Arab Emirates and Singapore. It was the manufacturer of the ML-300 lantern, widely used in lighthouses around the world for more than 50 years.

== History ==
Tideland Signal was founded by several salesmen of Automatic Power, a battery manufacturer which was then a primary player in the buoy market. The company originally sold directly to Automatic's market, but with limited success.

During the 1960s, solar cells had started to become practical systems for recharging batteries in remote locations. Hoffman Electronics, a pioneer in solar power, had approached Automatic with the idea of placing panels on their buoys to reduce the number of battery replacements needed to keep a site operations. Automatic instead saw this as a serious threat to their business, so they purchased the Hoffman concept and buried it.

Shortly thereafter, a research division of Exxon was in the process of introducing their own solar panels. Examining the market, they saw that Tideland was struggling with 30% market share, and approached them. Tideland took up development, introducing a buoy with rechargeable batteries and a solar panel. It was an immediate success, and the company soon eclipsed Automatic. By the late 1970s the solar-powered buoy was widely used.

In 1965 Tideland introduced the world first transistorized automatic lamp changer. In 1967 Tideland introduced a 300 millimetres (12 in) acrylic Fresnel lens lantern, the ML-300, which is still widely used.

In 2002, the European Commission issued a tender for the procurement of navigation aids for the ports of Aktau (Kazakhstan), Baku (Azerbaijan) and Turkmenbashi (Turkmenistan) under a EuropeAid project which the European Union was undertaking. Tideland submitted a tender via its UK subsidiary. The European Commission then changed the description of one of its requirements and returned the tender documents, unopened, to the companies who had submitted them. This was to enable the companies involved to revise and re-submit their proposals, with a revised tender closing date. The commission's changes did not affect the supplies being offered by Tideland so the company resubmitted their original tender in advance of the commission's revised deadline. However, one of the tender documents stated that the company would keep its tender open for 90 days, "i.e. until 28/07/02", which complied with a requirement specified by the Commission in its original invitation to tender. The 90 day requirement for the amended tender process entailed that tenders were now to be kept open until a later date, and so the Commission rejected Tideland's tender as non-compliant. Tideland successfully challenged the commission's actions in the Court of Justice of the European Union, where the Court held that the commission should have sought a clarification from the company about its undertaking to hold the tender open, instead of rejecting it.

The basics of this judgment have subsequently been referred to as the "Tideland principles", according to which there is a duty in European public law to seek clarification of a tender in exceptional circumstances, where the submitted tender is ambiguous, but only where the ambiguity probably has a simple explanation and is capable of being easily resolved, and such resolution will not in reality create an opportunity to submit a new tender.

In June 2012, Rock Hill Capital closed a majority recapitalization of Tideland. In 2016, Rock Hill sold Tideland to Xylem, a water technology company. In June 2020, Xylem announced that Tideland has ceased operations.

In September 2020, Orga Signal, a Netherlands-based provider of marine navigational aids, announced that it had bought some of Tideland's intellectual property and product design assets. In April 2021, Orga Signal announced that it would continue the production of the Tideland product portfolio from the original facility in Houston.

== Tideland ML-300 ==
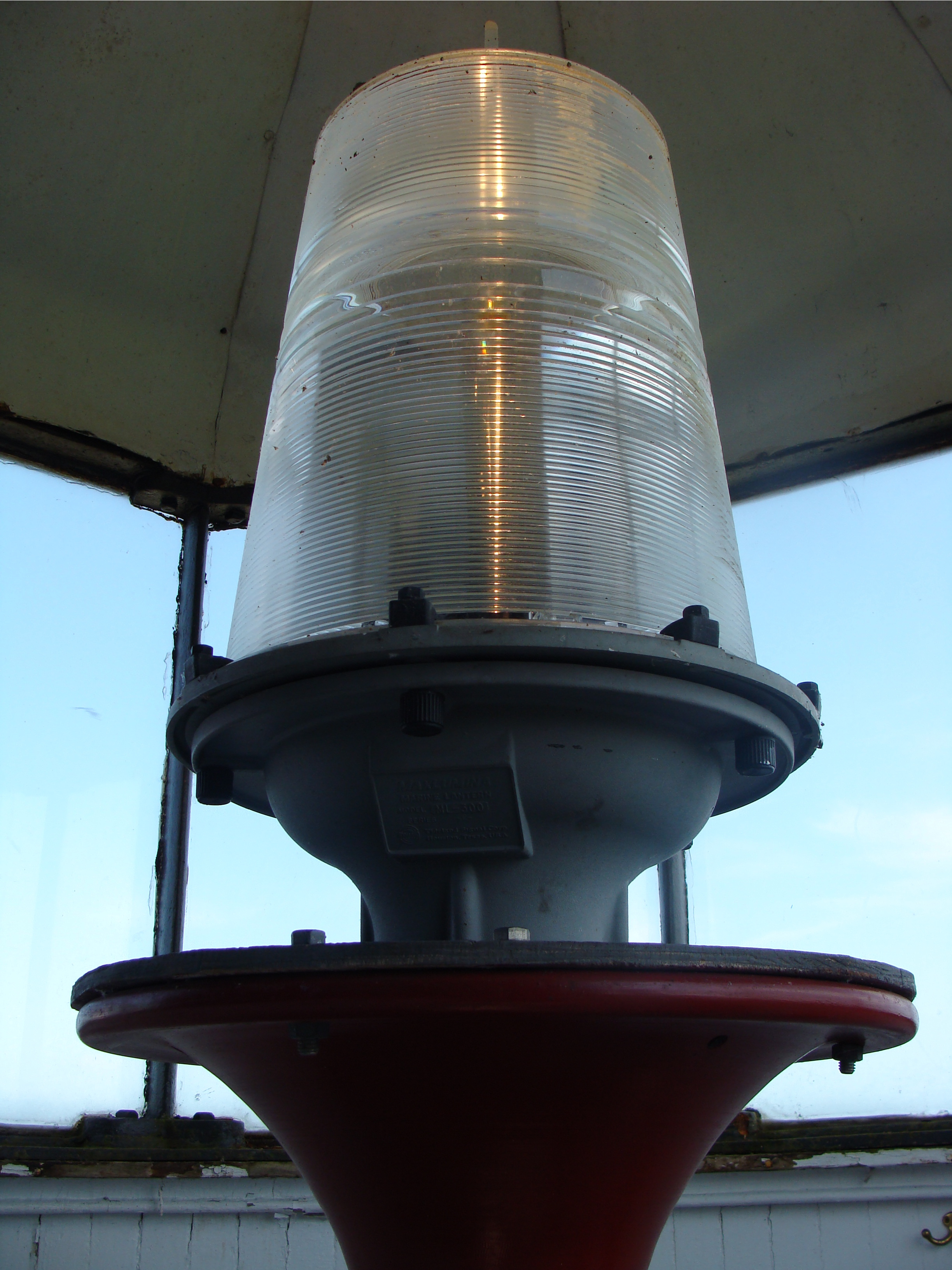
An ML-300 lantern in the Presque Isle Light

The Tideland ML-300 (ML for MaxLumina) is a multi-purpose marine lantern, with a focal length of 300 millimetres (12 in). It consists of a single piece injection molding acrylic 300mm Fresnel lens and a base assembly, where a flasher or lamp changer can be installed. The light produced is a 360° omnidirectional beam and colored signatures are achieved by colored inserts. It has a range of more than 10 nautical miles (19 km; 12 mi).

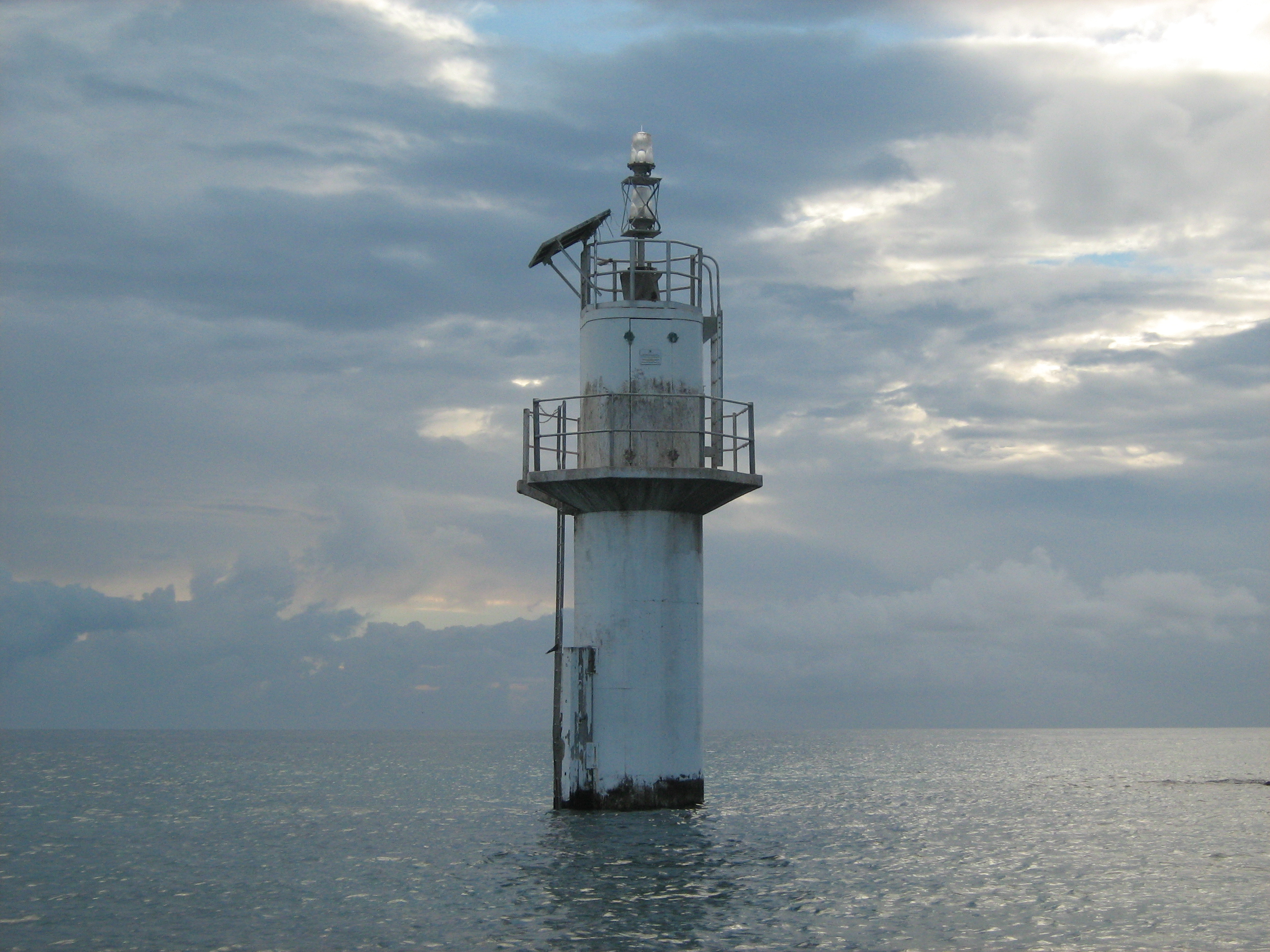
An ML-300 at Bugatti Reef Light

Since its introduction in 1967, the ML-300 is in wide use all around the world. It is in wide use in the Great Lakes region as a medium-range lens. It is also in use in Australia by the Australian Maritime Safety Authority, for example in Dent Island Light and Bugatti Reef Light, both in Queensland.

== Other products ==
In 2010, Tideland Signal provided SB‐30 lateral marker buoys and three DM‐390 buoys for use during the Vancouver Winter Olympics.
