= Wolf Rock (Queensland) =

Marine pinnacles in Queensland, Australia

Coordinates: 25°54′38″S 153°11′46″E

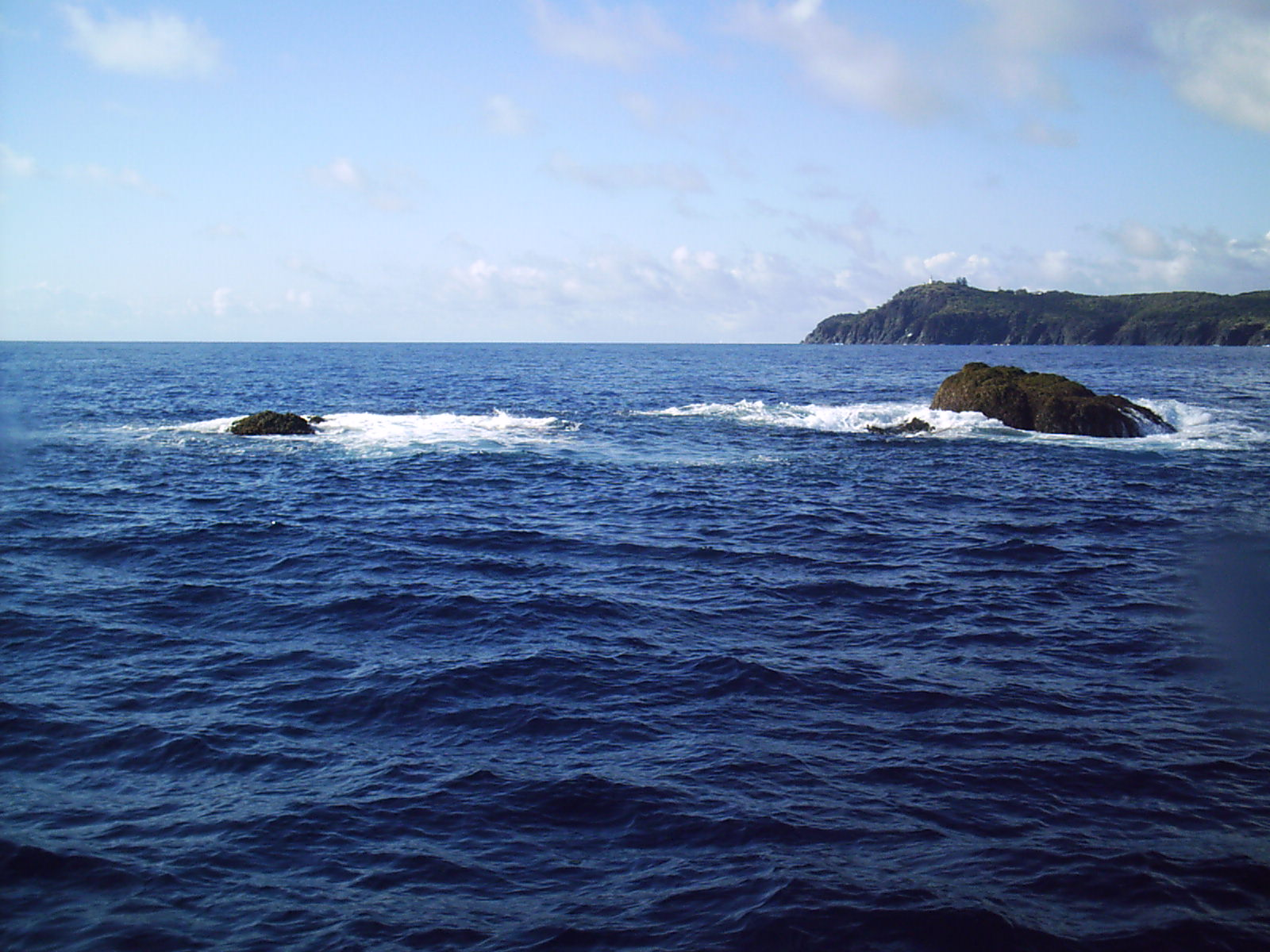
Wolf Rock

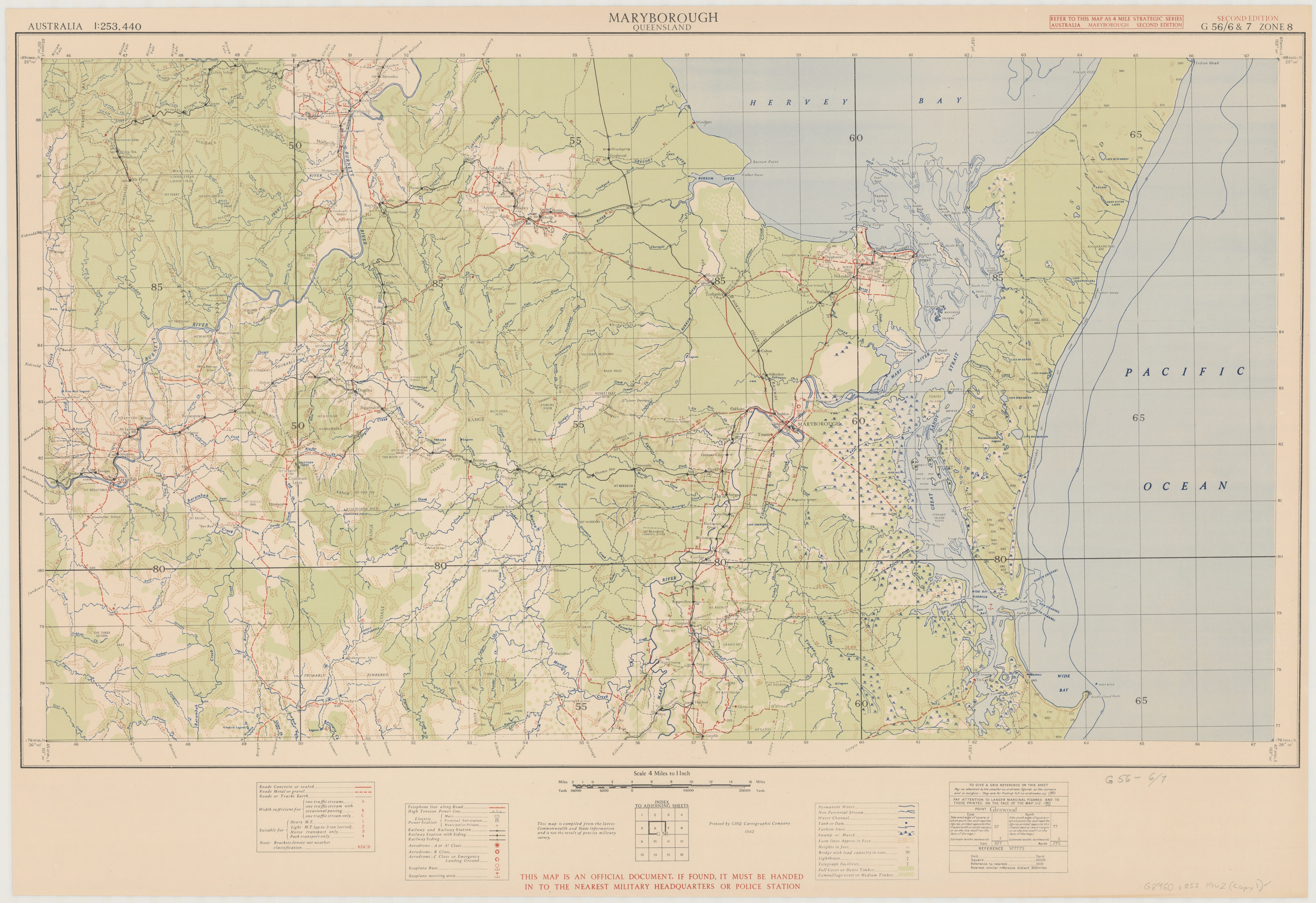
Wolf Rock in the lower part of the topo map sheet

Wolf Rock is a set of four volcanic pinnacles two kilometres north-northeast of Double Island Point in Cooloola, Gympie Region, Queensland, Australia. The location is a popular scuba diving spot.

It is said the rock was named for one of Captain Cook's crew who first saw the rocks on rounding Double Island Point. There was certainly an Archibald Wolfe on Cook's voyage, but Cook doesn't record the rocks, nor anyone in particular seeing them (or the point) first.

Wolf Rock is considered by the Queensland Government to be Queensland's most important habitat area for the critically endangered grey nurse shark. It is a mating area and a high number of females and pregnant females have been seen there. From 19 December 2003 the rock and three other highly significant areas were declared protected, with no fishing of any kind permitted at Wolf Rock and only very limited fishing at the others. (Scuba diving is still permitted.)
