= Cape Cleveland Light =

Lighthouse in Queensland, Australia

- Cape Cleveland Light at dusk, 2008
- Location: Townsville; Queensland; Australia
- Coordinates: 19°10′58.3″S 147°00′55.7″E

Tower
- Constructed: 1879
- Construction: timber frame clad with galvanized iron
- Automated: 1987
- Height: 36 feet (11 m)
- Shape: tapered cylindrical tower with balcony and lantern
- Markings: white tower, red lantern dome
- Operator: Australian Maritime Safety Authority
- Heritage: listed on the Queensland Heritage Register, listed on the Register of the National Estate

Light
- Focal height: 210 feet (64 m)
- Lens: VRB-25
- Intensity: white: 48,430 cd red: 10,170 cd
- Range: white: 15 nmi (28 km; 17 mi) red: 12 nmi (22 km; 14 mi)
- Characteristic: Fl WR 7.5s.

Cape Cleveland Light is an active heritage-listed lighthouse located on the northern tip of Cape Cleveland, a promontory projecting into the Coral Sea west of Cleveland Bay in the locality of Cape Cleveland about 40 kilometres (25 mi) east of Townsville, Queensland, Australia. The lighthouse marks the northern point of the Cape, and the entrance to Cleveland Bay.

== Establishment ==
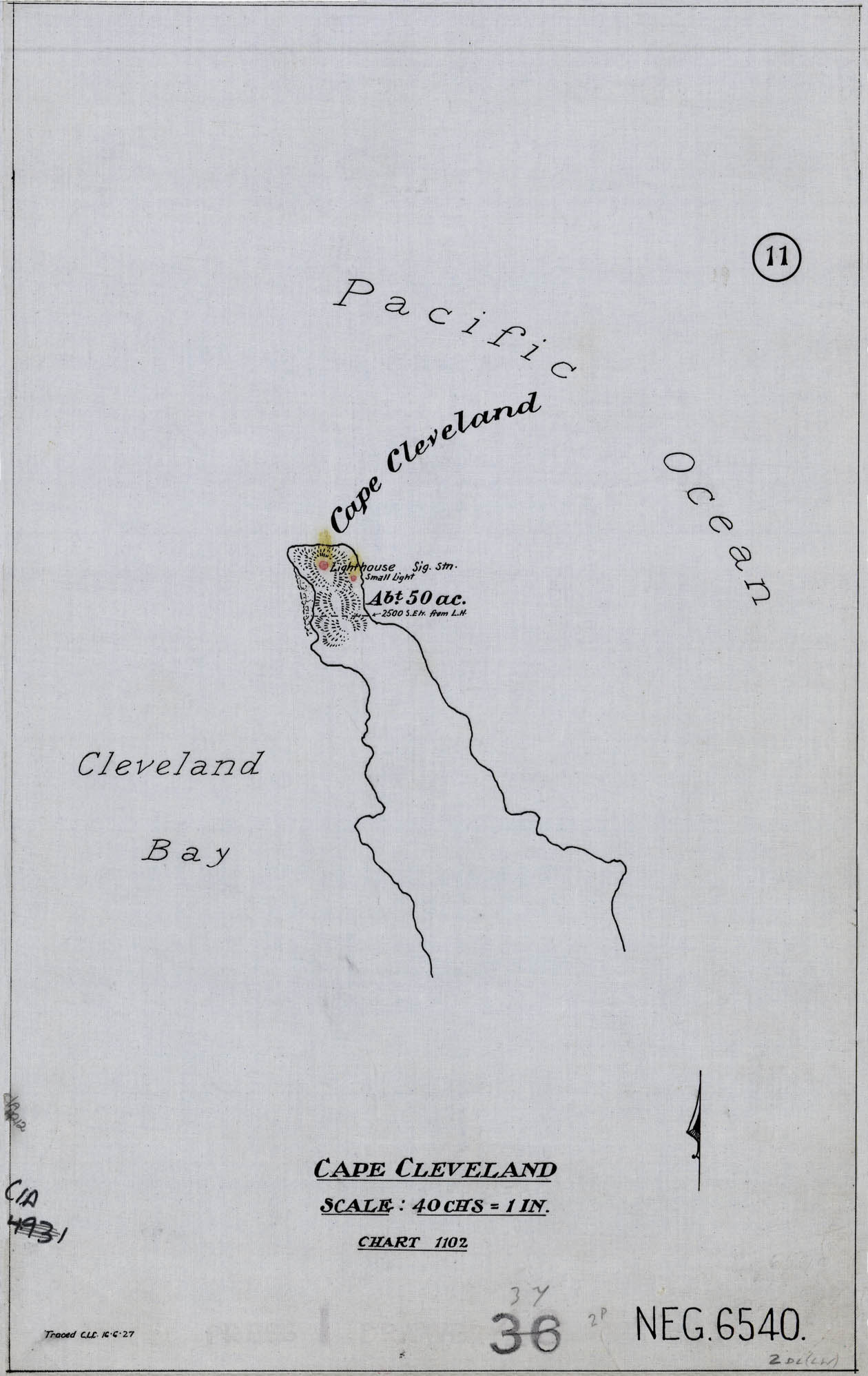
1927 plans showing the cape and the lighthouse position

Cape Cleveland was named by Captain James Cook in 1770, either in honour of a John Clevland the Secretary to the Admiralty around that time, or after Cleveland, England where he was born.

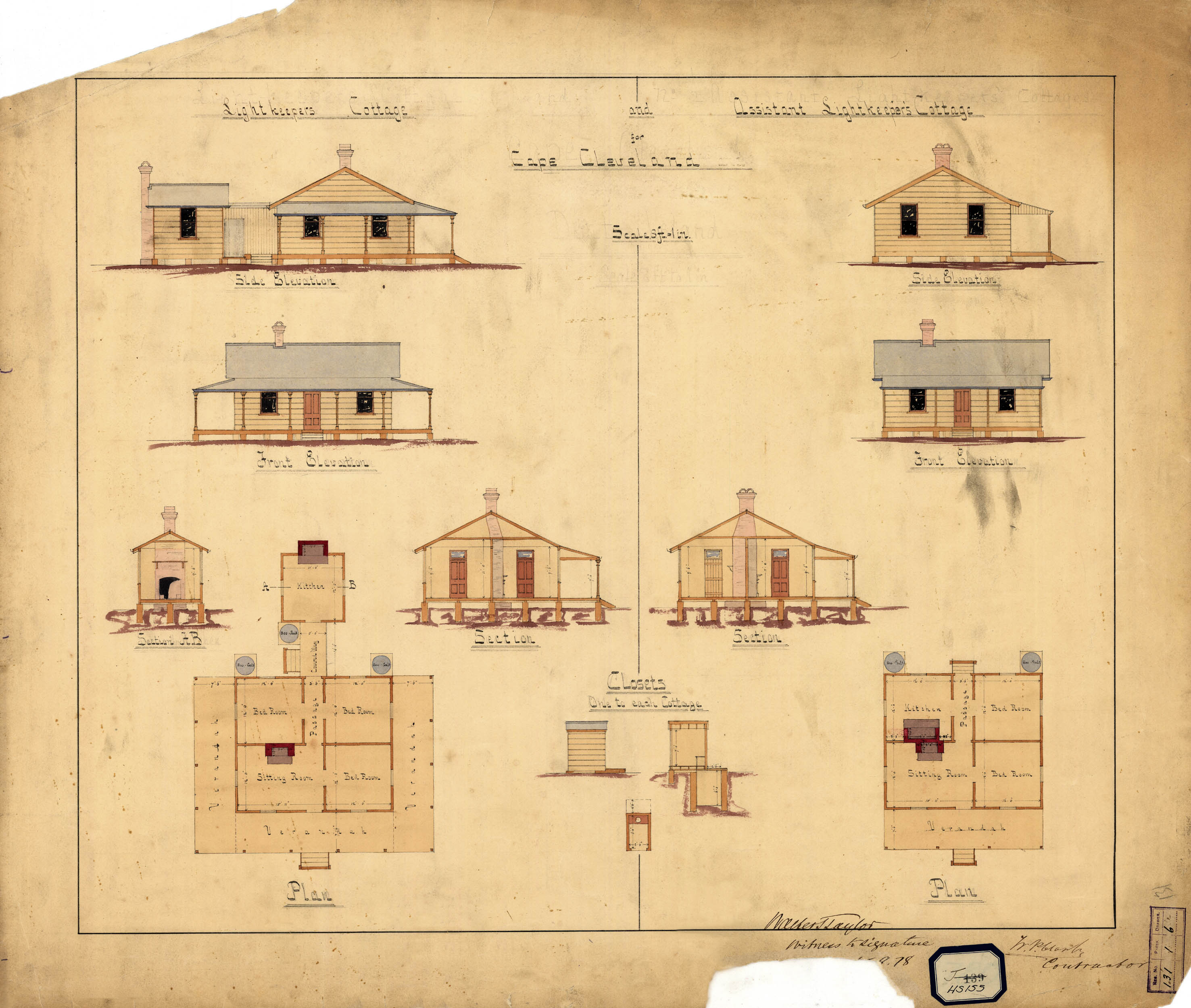
1878 plans of the original keepers' cottages, replaced in 1953

The need for a lighthouse at Cape Cleveland arose with the proclamation of Cleveland Bay as a port of entry in 1865, and the development of Townsville into a major port. From its beginning, the lighthouse was closely related to the Dent Island Light. The construction of both lighthouses was recommended by Commander George Poynter Heath, the Chairman of the Queensland Marine Board, in February 1878. The lighthouses were formally approved in April 1878 and tenders for the construction of both stations, each including a lighthouse and two keepers' cottages, were called in May 1878 and closed in June 1878. The tenders were awarded to W. P. Clark, who also constructed Bustard Head Light (1868), Low Isles Light (1877), Double Island Point Light (1884) and Pine Islet Light (1885). However, following personal difficulties, the contracts were transferred to John Clark and James Wiseman who completed the construction of both stations in December 1879.

The lighthouse was designed by F.D.G. Stanley, the Queensland Colonial Architect of the time. It was the thirteenth lighthouse constructed by the Government of Queensland and the fourteenth in total in Queensland, Cape Moreton Light being constructed by the New South Wales Government. It was built in the unique Queensland method of constructing a timber frame and cladding it with non-structural iron plates or iron sheets. Originally, the light also served as a rear light, but the range has since been discontinued. Like other lighthouses at that time it used a clockwork mechanism with weights, which had to be wound periodically. Due to its short height (36 feet (11 m)) the mechanism had to be wound every 75 minutes, which was a big strain on the lighthouse keepers.

== Development ==
closeup of the lighthouse, 1917

A telephone line to Townsville was installed in 1924. In 1926 the lens was replaced and the light source was converted to an acetylene gas lamp with an intensity of 50,000 cd. During World War II the lighthouse served as an observation post for the nearby Townsville which was a large allied base. An observation platform, a radar hut and a powerhouse were constructed at the post during the war, though only ruins remain.

In 1953 the two residences, as well as other sheds and building, were replaced. In 1956 the lens was replaced again. In the 1980s a new power house was constructed. On 19 September 1987 the light was converted to solar power and in December 1987 the lightstation was demanned. The solar power was upgraded to its current setup on 12 July 1994.

== Current display ==
The current light characteristic is a flash every 7.5 second, red or white depending on the sector. White flashes, with an intensity of 48,430 cd, visible for 15 nautical miles (28 km; 17 mi), are shown on 286°-321° and 342°-259°. Red flashes, with an intensity of 10,170 cd, visible for 12 nautical miles (22 km; 14 mi), are shown on 259°-286° (over Four Foot Rock). Otherwise, the light is obscured. The apparatus is a VRB-25, turning at 1.333 rpm and the light source is a 12 Volt 35 Watt Halogen lamp.

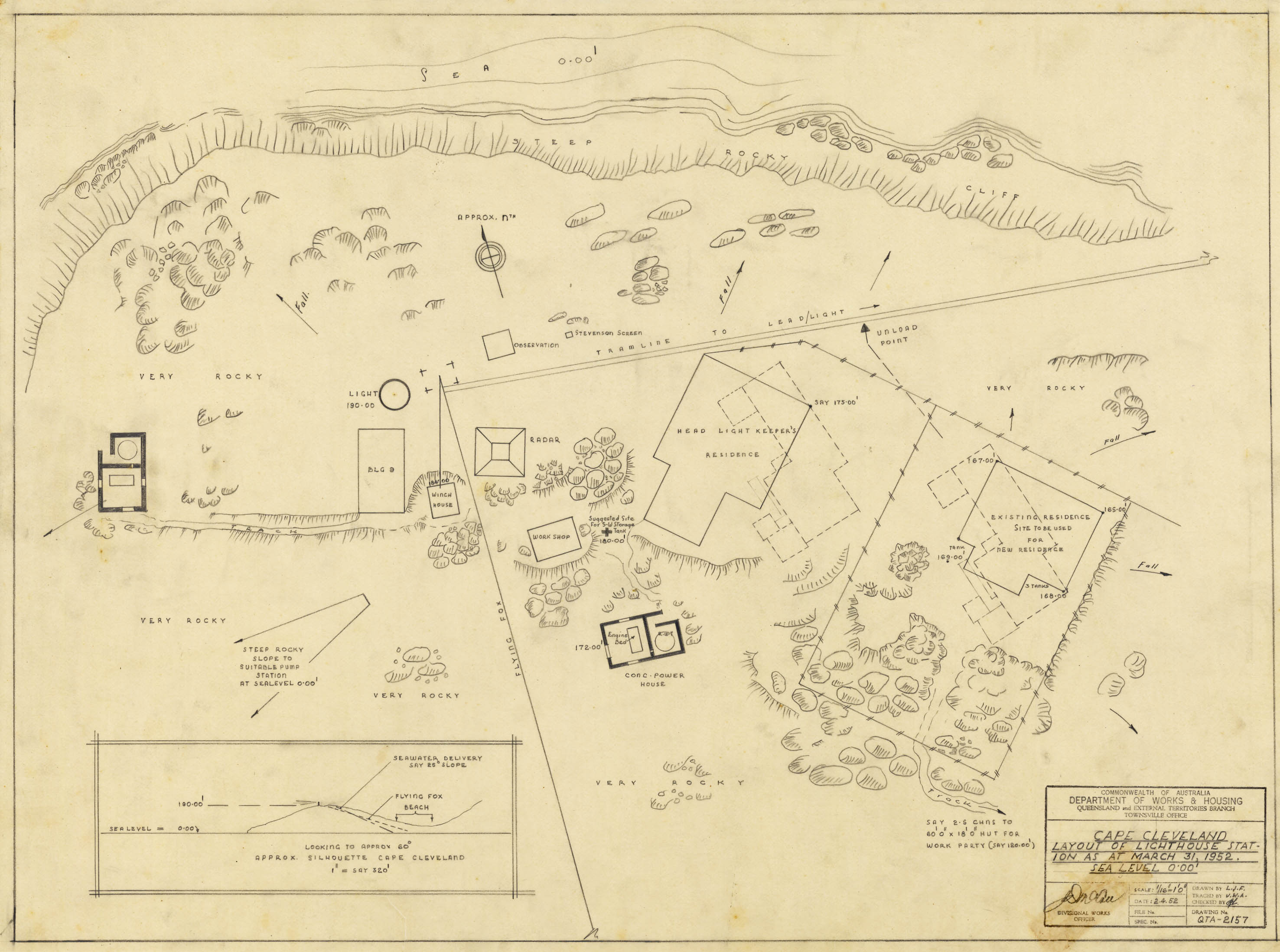
1952 plans showing the location of the different structures

== Structures ==
Unlike other stations, the Cape Cleveland Light structures are built in a nonlinear fashion, to fit the contours of the site. They include the lighthouse, two residences, and assorted buildings.

=== Lighthouse and residences ===
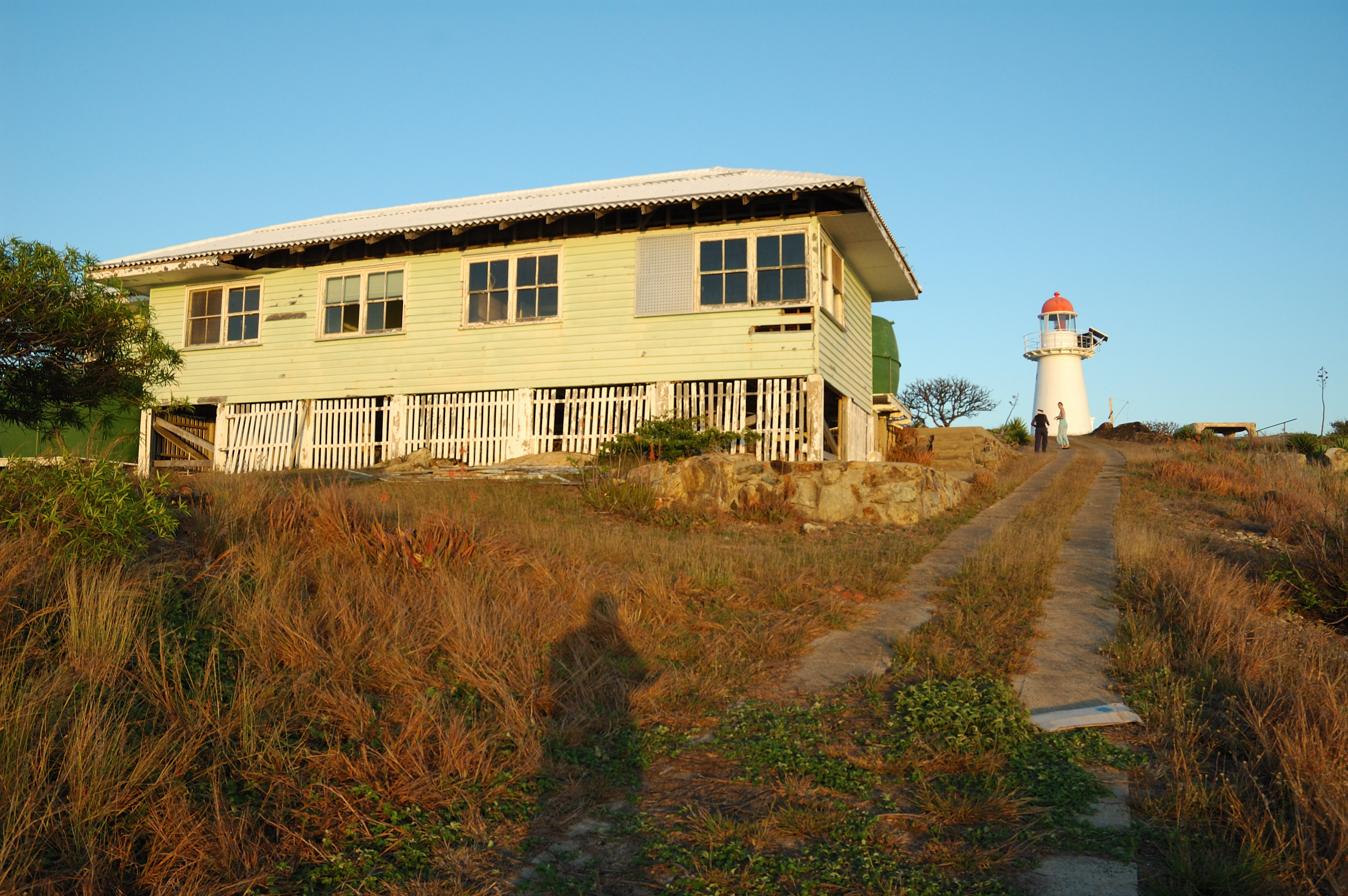
One of the residences, 2008

The circular tower is 6.7 metres (22 ft) from base to lantern. It is built of an internal timber frame, clad with riveted galvanized iron plates, painted white. The tower is topped by an iron lantern room with a copper cupola, painted red. The lantern room is surrounded by a cantilevered iron balcony, supported on brackets, with simple iron railing. The tower's solar panels are mounted on the balcony.

The two 1953 cottages are timber-framed, clad with timber weatherboards and trimmed with timber battens, painted pale green, white and dark green. The hip roofs are clad with corrugated fibro cement with stainless steel gutters and downpipes. They have timber frame doors and timber sash windows with metal window screens. The structures are raised on concrete piers. Over the years the cottages have deteriorated in condition.

=== Other structures ===
Other structures include the old and new power houses, a garage, a workshop/store, a helipad, a flagpole, rainwater tanks, a solar powerhouse for hot water, weather recording equipment in a Stevenson screen, and remnants of a Tramway and a winch house for the now removed flying fox. The concrete foundations of the World War II observation post and radar hut also remain. All structures are in a dilapidated condition.

Cape Cleveland flying fox in 1968.

The old World War II powerhouse is a bunker-like structure, built of reinforced concrete with a small extension to the east, which was at some point used as a henhouse. The main section roof is covered with asphalt, and the extension has a pitched galvanised iron gable roof. One rectangular opening is in the main section and one in the extension. The garage and the workshop are timber-framed and fibro clad, with a gable roofs of corrugated fibro cement with metal gutters and downpipes. They have timber doors, timber floors and timber-framed louvre windows.

== Site operation and visiting ==
Both the light and the site are operated by the Australian Maritime Safety Authority and are closed to the public. The site is only accessible by boat or helicopter.

== Heritage listing ==
The lighthouse was listed on the Queensland Heritage Register on 9 November 1998.

== See also ==
- List of lighthouses in Australia
