= Dent Island Light =

Lighthouse in Queensland, Australia

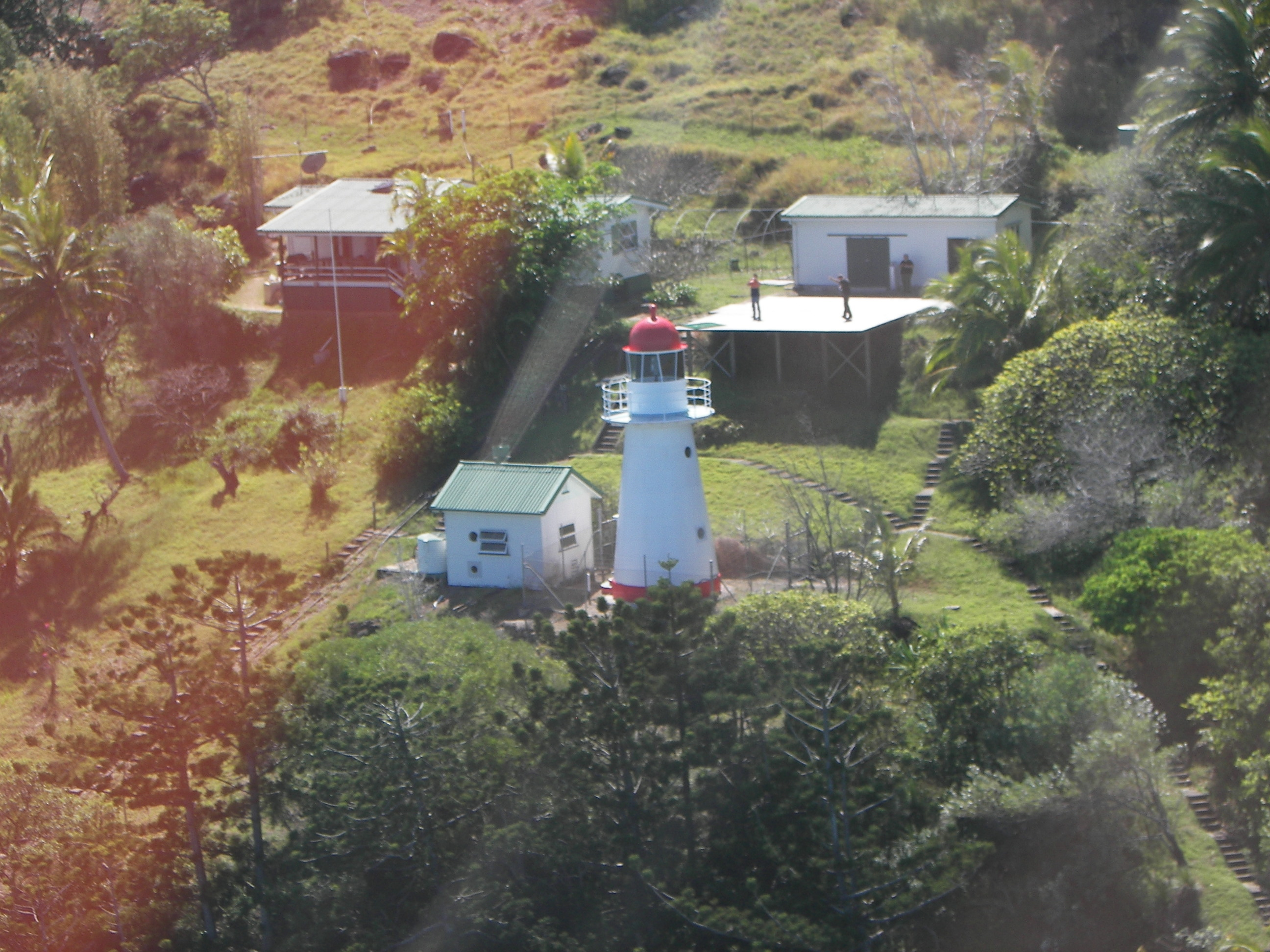
- Dent Island Lightstation, 2007
- Location: Dent Island; Queensland; Australia
- Coordinates: 20°22′09.31″S 148°55′44.17″E

Tower
- Constructed: 1879
- Construction: timber frame clad with galvanized iron
- Automated: 1987
- Height: 33 feet (10 m)
- Shape: conical tower with balcony and lantern
- Markings: white tower and lantern, red lantern dome
- Power source: solar power
- Operator: Australian Maritime Safety Authority
- Heritage: listed on the Commonwealth Heritage List

Light
- Focal height: 121 feet (37 m)
- Lens: 4th order (original), ML-300 (current)
- Intensity: 1785 cd
- Range: 10 nautical miles (19 km; 12 mi)
- Characteristic: Fl.W. 5s

Dent Island Light is an active lighthouse on Dent Island, a small island off the coast of Queensland, Australia, part of the Whitsunday Group of the Whitsunday Islands. Located on the southwest tip of the island, the light guides ships navigating the Whitsunday Passage, between Whitsunday Island and the islands to the west, and marks the Dent Island Passage.

From its inception, the lighthouse was closely connected to Cape Cleveland Light. Both lighthouses were recommended, approved, tendered and finally, in December 1879, constructed together. The light had two upgrades in the 1920s, replacing both the oil lamp and fourth-order lens with an incandescent gas mantle and a new lens. In 1983, it was converted to solar power; and was demanned in 1987.

The lighthouse is a typical for Queensland, made of a timber frame clad with galvanized iron plates. It is topped by a Chance Brothers lantern room, and painted white with a red dome. A modern ML-300 lantern replaced the original lens.

== History ==
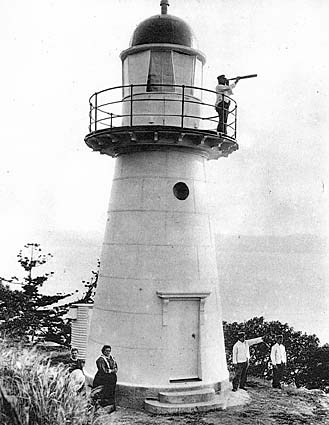
A 1917 photo of the lighthouse

From its beginning, the lighthouse was closely related to the Cape Cleveland Light. The construction of both lighthouses was recommended by Commander George Poynter Heath, the Chairman of the Queensland Marine Board, in February 1878. The lighthouses were formally approved in April 1878 and tenders for the construction of both stations, each including a lighthouse and two keepers' cottages, were called in May 1878 and closed in June 1878. The tenders were awarded to W. P. Clark, who also constructed Bustard Head Light (1868), Low Isles Light (1877), Double Island Point Light (1884) and Pine Islet Light (1885). However, following personal difficulties, the contracts were transferred to John Clark and James Wiseman who completed the construction of both stations in December 1879.

The tower was constructed in the unique Queensland method of constructing a timber frame and cladding it with non-structural iron plates or iron sheets. The original apparatus comprised a fourth order lens with an oil wick burner of 4,000 cd intensity. Like other lighthouses at that time it used a clockwork mechanism with weights, which had to be wound periodically. Due to its short height, only 6 metres (20 ft) from the base to the lantern, the mechanism had to be wound every 75 minutes.

In 1925, the light was upgraded to a 35mm incandescent gas mantle fueled by pressurised kerosene, with an intensity of 225,000 cd, visible for 18 nautical miles (33 km; 21 mi). In 1927 the lens was replaced with refurbished lens from Cape Cleveland Light.

In 1983 the light was converted to solar power and downgraded to a visibility range of 10 nautical miles (19 km; 12 mi). It was finally demanned in 1987.

== Current display ==
The current light characteristic is a white flash every five seconds (Fl.W. 5s) visible at 335°-167°, for a distance of 10 nautical miles (19 km; 12 mi). The apparatus is an ML-300 and the light source is a 12 Volt 35 Watt Halogen lamp with an intensity of 1785 cd.

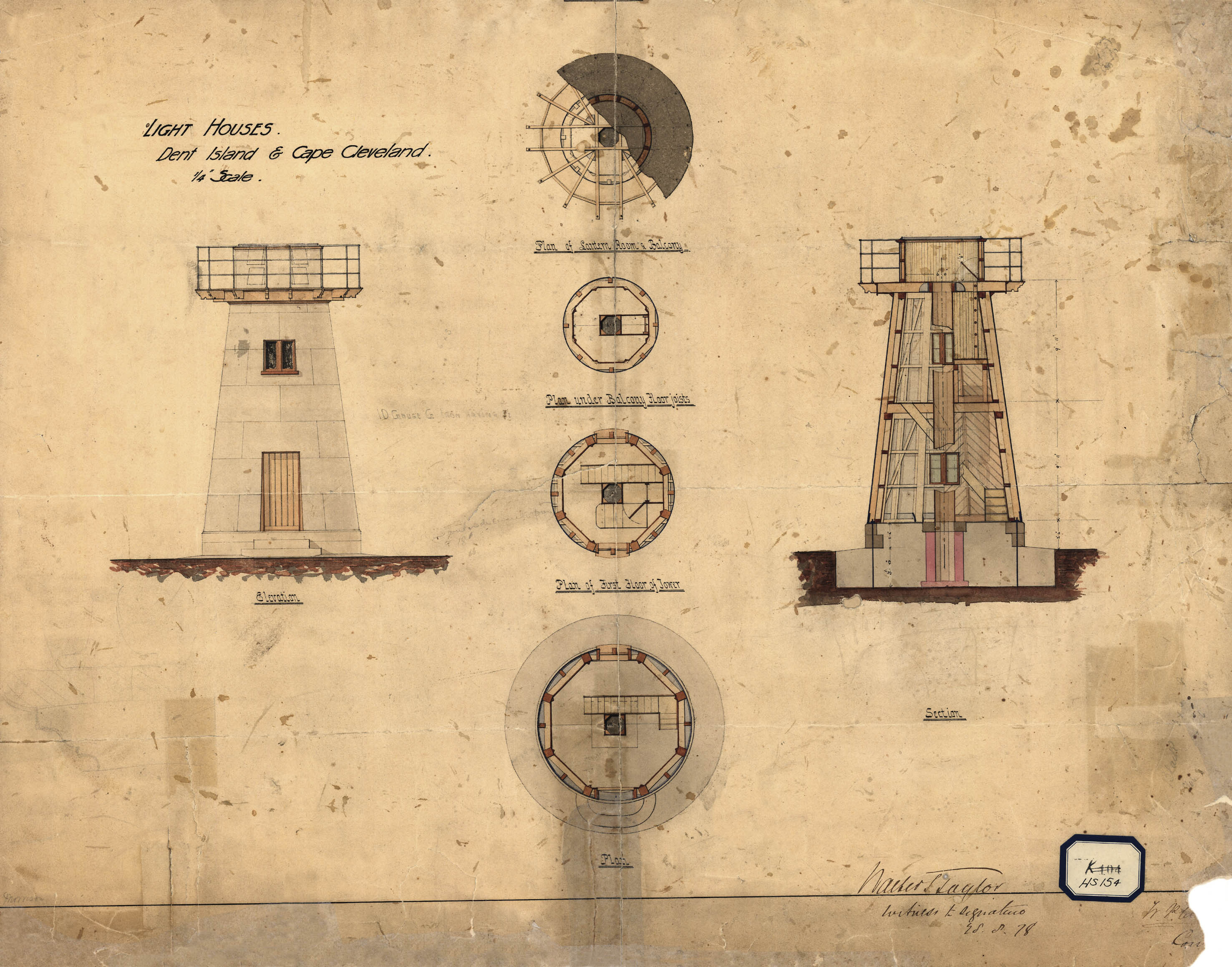
Plans for the tower, 1878

== Structures ==
The tower is 6 metres (20 ft) from the base to the lantern, conical in shape. It is built of an internal timber frame, clad with galvanized iron plates, painted white. Access from the entrance to the lantern is via a circular cast iron staircase. The tower is topped by a 6 feet 7.75 inches (2.0257 m) diameter Chance Brothers lantern room, white painted with the dome painted red. The modern ML-300 lens is installed inside the lantern room.

The station includes two cottages, constructed in 1960, timber-framed, fibro clad, with galvanised iron roofs. One of the cottages has two storeys and a closed verandah, while the other is single levelled with an open verandah. The station also comprises a winch house, stores shed, engine room and combined workshop/radio room.

== Site operation and visiting ==
The light is operated by the Australian Maritime Safety Authority. The island is accessible only by boat. However, Dent island is privately owned, so the site is closed to the public.

== See also ==
- List of lighthouses in Australia
