= Double Island Point Light =

Lighthouse in Queensland, Australia

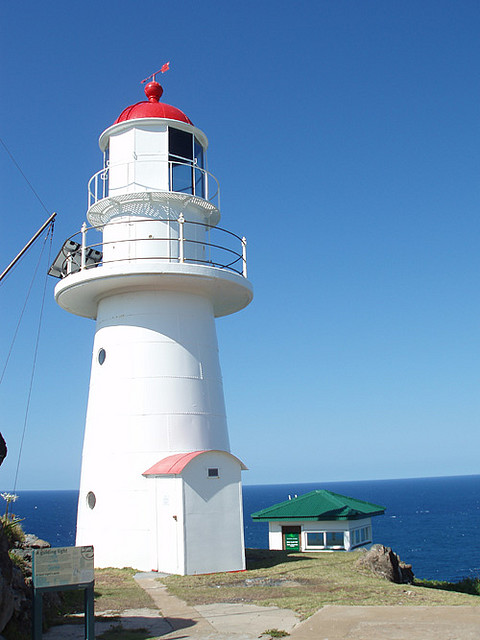
- Double Island Point Light, 2006
- Location: Double Island Point, Cooloola, Gympie Region, Queensland, Australia
- Coordinates: 25°55′54.3″S 153°11′26.4″E

Tower
- Constructed: 1884
- Construction: timber frame clad with galvanized iron
- Height: 39 feet (12 m)
- Shape: conical tower with double gallery and lantern
- Markings: white tower and lantern, red lantern dome
- Power source: solar power
- Operator: Australian Maritime Safety Authority
- Heritage: listed on the Queensland Heritage Register

Light
- Focal height: 315 feet (96 m)
- Lens: VRB-25
- Intensity: 48,430 cd
- Range: 17 nautical miles (31 km; 20 mi)
- Characteristic: Fl W 7.5s.

Double Island Point Light is an active lighthouse located at the summit of Double Island Point, a coastal headland within the Cooloola section of the Great Sandy National Park. It is located at the southern end of Wide Bay, 70 kilometres (43 mi) north of Noosa Heads, Queensland, Australia.

Though the location was indicated for a lighthouse in 1864, it was only constructed in 1884, by W. P. Clark, who constructed other Queensland lighthouses. Upgrades to the kerosene fueled light and the lens occurred in 1923 and 1925. Major reconstruction occurred in 1933 when the light was converted to 110 V electricity, significantly increasing its luminosity, and new cottages replaced the originals. In 1980 the light was converted to 240 V and finally, solar conversion took place in 1991. Double Island Point Light became automatic the following year.

The lighthouse is typical for Queensland, made of timber frame clad with galvanized iron plates, painted white with a red dome. It is surmounted by an original Chance Brothers lantern with a modern VRB-25 self-contained rotating beacon mounted inside. It is surrounded by several auxiliary structures. The two lighthouse keepers' cottages, hardwood framed and sheeted with asbestos cement, are at a lower level, with a few other buildings. The site is positioned in the Great Sandy National Park, but there is no public access to the lighthouse.

== History ==
The colony of Queensland was formed in 1859. In 1862, the Queensland government appointed the first Portmaster, Commander George Poynter Heath. However, it was only in 1864 that two committees were appointed to deal with the issue of coastal lighthouses. One of the locations indicated by these committees as a possible suitable site was Double Island Point. However, it was to take almost two decades until the Queensland Government took action upon this recommendation.

In 1881 or 1882 Heath made a report to the Parliament stating the need for the lighthouse. In 1883 he made a visit to the island and realised that the originally planned location, halfway up the point, would result in a light that would not be visible to the north. He advised that the lighthouse will be constructed at the summit of the point, with a 3rd Order light, a more powerful light than originally planned, and advise which was accepted. Plans were made by the Queensland Colonial Architect's Office, and at the end of June 1883 tenders were called, for the construction of the lighthouse and lighthouse keeper cottages, for both Double Island Point Light and c. The contract for both lightstations, for the cost of £6900, was awarded to W. P. Clark, who already constructed Queensland's first lighthouse since Queensland's formation, Bustard Head Light (in 1868), and who was also awarded the contract for Low Isles Light in 1877 and for Cape Cleveland Light and Dent Island Light in 1878.

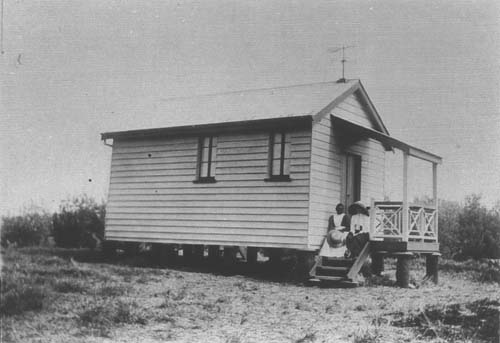
The school established at the point in 1884

The lighthouse was first exhibited on 11 September 1884, the eighteenth to be constructed by the Queensland Government. The original lamp was an oil wick burner with an intensity of 13,000 cd. It was fixed, with revolving panels. Three lighthouse keeper cottages were also constructed, originally located near the lighthouse. A schoolhouse was also established at the point at the same time, which was active until 1922.

In 1923, the light was converted to a 55 millimetres (2.2 in) incandescent gas mantle fueled by vapourised kerosene, with an intensity of 100,000 cd. A further upgrade in 1925 replaced the lens with a third order 500 millimetres (20 in) focal length revolving apparatus floating in a mercury bath. In 1933 the light was converted to 110 V electricity, the lamp having an intensity of 750,000 cd. The original cottages were demolished and two modern cottages were constructed, further down the hill than the original ones, at the old location of the schoolhouse, at the crest of the ridge. A new watch hut was also constructed at that time.

In 1961 the radio was moved from the lighthouse area to a radio hut which was constructed near the cottages. This radio hut now serves as a weather hut. In 1980 a new powerhouse was constructed, holding two diesel engines, and bulk fuel tanks were installed. At that time the light was converted to 240 V AC and the light source was a 120 V 1000 W tungsten halogen lamp with an intensity of 1,000,000 cd, visible for 26 nautical miles (48 km; 30 mi).

The light was finally converted to a solar powered VRB-25 on 9 October 1991, at which point the third order optic apparatus and the lamp were removed. This reduced the strength of the light considerably, to 48,430 cd, resulting in a reduction of the range of visibility to 17 nautical miles (31 km; 20 mi). The station was fully automated, and staff removed, in 1992.

== Current display ==
The current light characteristic is a white flash every 7.5 seconds (Fl.W. 7.5s) visible at 109°-037°, for a distance of 17 nautical miles (31 km; 20 mi). The apparatus is a VRB-25 rotating at 1.33 rpm. The light source is a 12 Volt 35 Watt Halogen lamp with an intensity of 48,430 cd.

== Structures ==
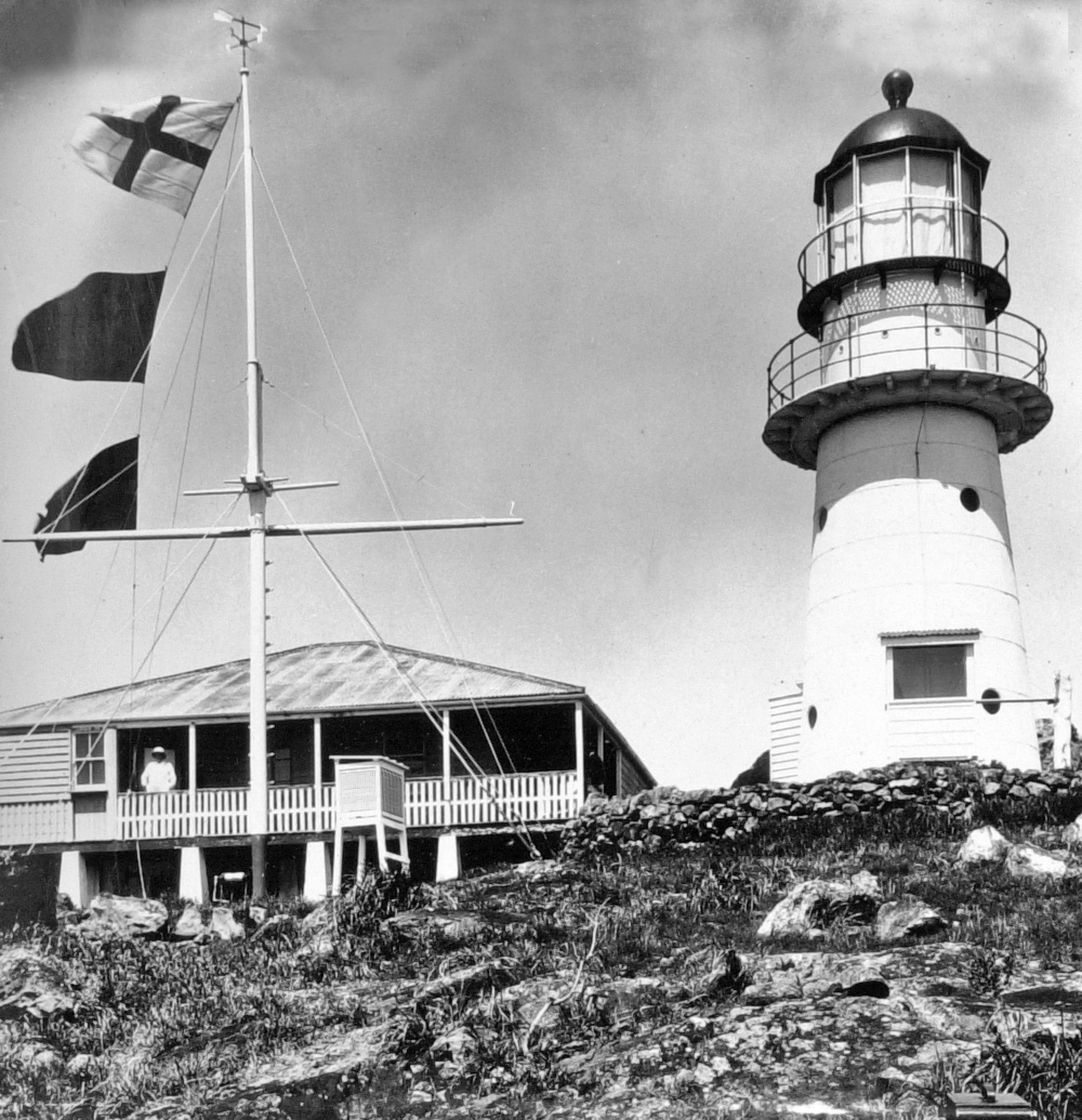
Lighthouse, circa 1931

The structures at the station are divided into two clusters, one around the lighthouse and the other near the cottages.

=== Lighthouse cluster ===
The lighthouse cluster includes low dry stone retaining walls to the east of the tower, which create a level area. It includes the tower, a watch hut, a powerhouse and a tank farm. There are also trees including two hoop pines, grass and flowering plants. Installed in this area are also an anemometer and some radio antennas.

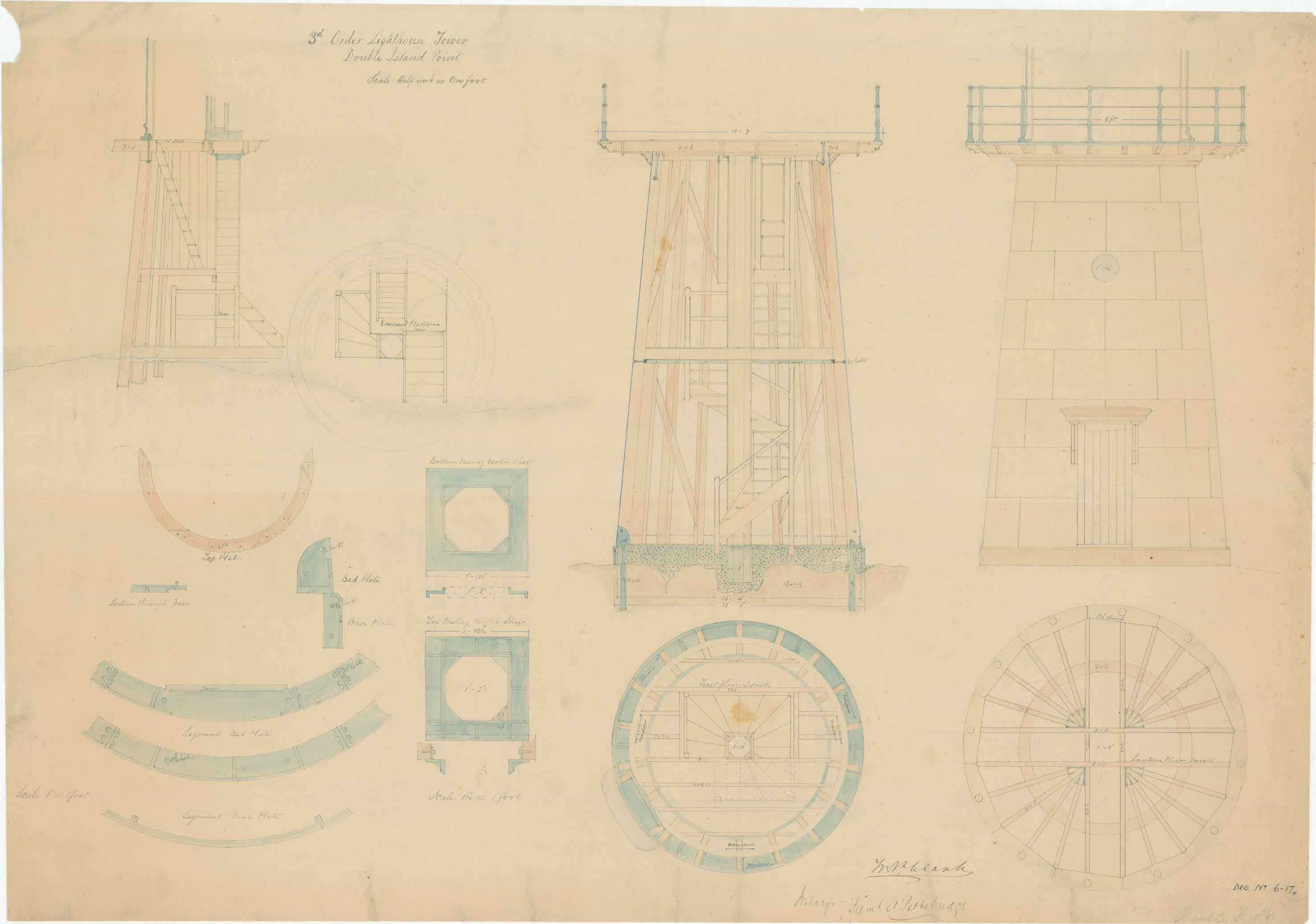
plans for the lighthouse, drawn in 1915

The tower is 8 metres (26 ft) from the base to the lantern, conical in shape. It is built of an internal timber frame, clad with galvanized iron plates, about 2 millimetres (0.079 in) thick, and painted white. The base and the ground floor are of mass concrete. On top of the tower is a round reinforced concrete balcony, supporting the lantern, an original Chance Brothers 8 feet 1.5 inches (2.477 m) diameter, made of cast and wrought iron. A VRB-25 lantern is mounted inside the lantern on the original mercury float pedestal, but with the mercury removed. The lantern is surmounted by a copper cupola, painted red.

The 1933 watch hut is hardwood framed, clad with asbestos cement. It is built on a concrete base and has a corrugated asbestos cement roof. The 1980 powerhouse is a cavity walled brick structure, with a reinforced concrete floor and a ring beam. It houses two diesel engines. The 1980 bulk tank farm uses a number of small tanks.

=== Cottage cluster ===
The cottage cluster includes the two 1933 cottages, one for the head lightkeeper and one for his assistant, a weather shack, a garage, a workshop/store, service pits, a flag pole, and a Stevenson screen.

The cottages are hardwood framed and sheeted with asbestos cement. The hardwood floor is constructed on raised concrete stumps and the roofs are of corrugated steel. rainwater tanks are installed next to the cottages. The 1961 weather shack, which mainly acts as an office for recording weather observations, is timber-framed, clad with asbestos cement, with a concrete floor and corrugated asbestos cement roof. The flag pole is a 75 millimetres (3.0 in) diameter galvanised steel tube set in concrete, with hardwood beams and stainless steel stays. The garage is a made of brick with concrete floor and timber-framed aluminium sheet roof. The keepers' vehicles are sheltered at an attached carport with concrete floor, galvanised steel tube columns and a roof of hardwood framed corrugated asbestos cement. The workshop is a prefabricated galvanised steel frame structure, clad with aluminium sheeting and a concrete floor.

South of the cottages is the grave of Fanny Byrn, wife of George Byrne who was the head lightkeeper from February 1886 until July 1900. It is surrounded by a picket fence and marked with a marble headstone.

== Site operation and visiting ==
The light is operated by the Australian Maritime Safety Authority. The site is owned and operated by the Queensland Parks and Wildlife Service as part of the Great Sandy National Park. The site is accessible by four wheel drive from Rainbow Beach, but the tower is closed to the public.

== See also ==
- List of lighthouses in Australia
