= Alfredson's Joinery =

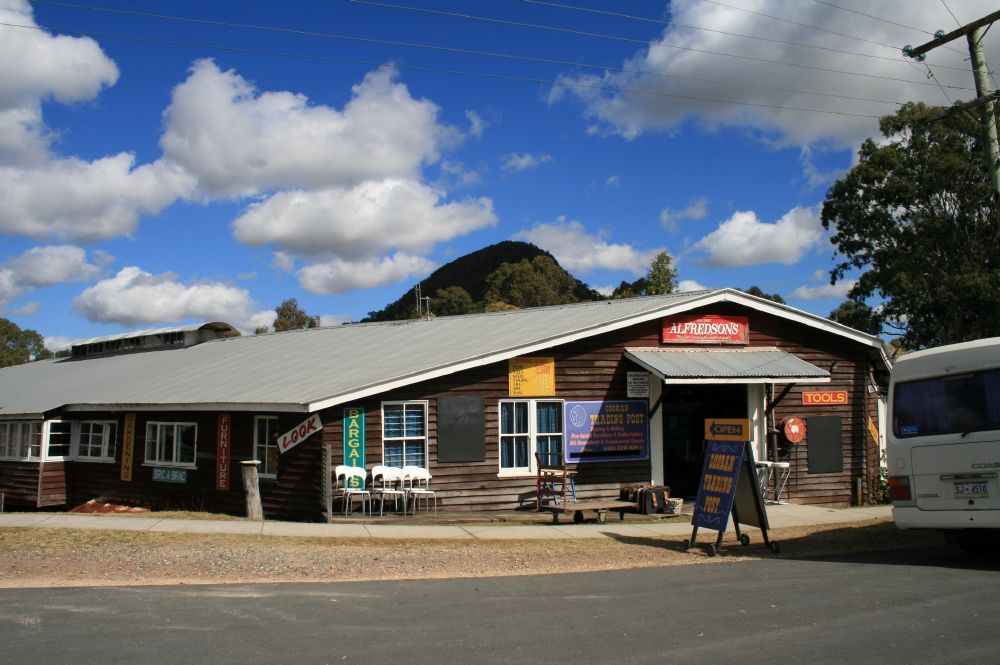
- Alfredson's Joinery, 2007

- Location within Queensland Location within Australia
- 26.3342°S 152.8212°E
- Location: 28 King Street, Cooran, Shire of Noosa, Queensland, Australia

History
- Design period: 1919–1930s (interwar period)
- Built: 1930s–1950s

Queensland Heritage Register
- Official name: Alfredson's Joinery, Pre-Cut House Workshop and Sawmill (former)
- Type: state heritage (built)
- Designated: 27 November 2008
- Reference no.: 602690
- Significant period: 1930s–1950s
- Significant components: machinery/plant/equipment – forestry/timber industry, workshop, mill – timber / sawmill

Alfredson's Joinery is a heritage-listed workshop at 28 King Street, Cooran, Shire of Noosa, Queensland, Australia. It was built from 1930s to 1950s. It is also known as Alfredson's Pre-Cut House Workshop and Alfredson's Sawmill. It was added to the Queensland Heritage Register on 27 November 2008.

== History ==
The former Alfredson's joinery, pre-cut house workshop and sawmill complex at 28 King Street Cooran is evidence of the long history of timber-based industry in the Noosa Shire and North Coast region. The business was also involved in efforts to address the post-World War II housing shortage. The multi-level timber building, built on a sloping site with a combination of gabled, saw tooth and skillion rooflines, provides intact evidence of a timber-based family business premises that was operated, expanded and adapted between 1933 and 1990.

Timber was the stimulus for the development of Noosa Shire. Development of the area was underway by the mid-1860s with timber getters active along the Noosa River and Kin Kin Creek. Around 1870 the township of Cooran began as a coach stop on the road from Tewantin to Gympie. This road was formed after a sawmill was established c.1870 at Mill Point, Lake Cootharaba, to supply the Gympie goldfield with timber. Logs from the mill, owned by McGhie, Luya and Co, were towed down the Noosa River to a depot at Tewantin. The railway arrived at Cooran from Gympie in June 1889, which helped the district to develop as an agricultural and timber centre. Shops were built along King Street in Cooran opposite the railway line, and the town became an important centre for loading local goods, freight, timber and produce onto the train. However, after the North Coast Railway between Gympie and Brisbane was completed in July 1891 the town of Cooroy, further south, became the main rail centre for access to Tewantin.

Timber continued to be important to the economy of Cooran. Albert Doyle was sawmilling at Cooran by 1907, and other sawmillers operating in the town prior to World War II included Renshaw and Loseby, George Renshaw, and Straker and Company. Dairy farming also grew as an industry in the Noosa Shire, and butter factories were opened at Kin Kin (1914), Cooroy (1915), Pomona (1919) and Eumundi (1920). During the 1920s the Shire boomed, and a 1926 newspaper report on a typical load of goods dispatched from Cooran by train included: bananas, beans, gooseberries, pigs, butter, case timber and log timber, cream, and opossums.

Mervyn William Henry Alfredson, born in Nambour in 1912, started his apprenticeship as a cabinetmaker with Page Furnishers in Pomona, and completed it in Gympie. He then returned to Cooran, where his father, Thorvald P Alfredson, was the Cooran railway station master. In May 1933 Mervyn Alfredson purchased 37.7 perches (950 m^{2}) of land opposite the railway station from Alice McIlwraith and set up a woodworking shop. In 1937 he married Mavis Miller, and for about six months they lived under the woodworking shop, placing timber from glass packing cases around the stumps to enclose the area. No evidence of this habitation remains under the present joinery. They then moved into a house at number 7 Henry Street, which has been occupied by the Alfredson family from c. 1938 to the present day, except for a period in the 1950s.

Alfredson is first listed in the Queensland Country Post Office Directory of 1939, as a "Joinery & Cabinet Maker". As he was in a reserved industry, he was rejected for defence service during World War II, but his workshop supplied the Australian Army with tent floors, tent pegs and other items. In September 1942 Alfredson purchased an additional 3 roods 11 perches (3,300 m^{2}) of land from Alice McIlwraith, to the south and west of his original workshop. In July 1944 the Widgee sawmill near Gympie was purchased to supply timber to Alfredson's operation, and M.W. Alfredson & Company was also formed that year. In October 1944 title for a one quarter share in the total landholding of 1 acre (0.40 ha) and 8.7 perches (220 m^{2}) went to Robert R. Brown, with the other three quarter shares being held by Mervyn Alfredson.

Alfredson's joinery complex appears to have been extended to the south and west, and given a skylight, in the late 1930s; and it was extended again to the south by the 1960s. By the mid-1960s the front (north) elevation of the joinery was truncated at an angle on the eastern side, as earlier photographs of this elevation do not display the current angle. The pre-cut house workshop and sawmill to the south of the joinery seem to post-date 1946. According to archived Queensland Forestry Department correspondence, in November 1946 Alfredson was seeking advice on the design of a timber seasoning yard, and was intending to erect a drying kiln and a boric acid treatment plant "in conjunction with his furniture factory and sawmill". A sketch from this time appears to show the joinery and a sawmill to its south and west. Apparently Alfredson's did have a sawmill on the western side of the joinery during the 1940s and 1950s, but they then lost the forestry license for this sawmill, and had to rely on the Widgee sawmill thereafter. However, there is still a sawmilling section at the south end of the pre-cut house workshop.

By the early 1950s Alfredson had devised a system, based on ideas he had read about in journals, of pre-cutting morticed and tenoned house frames. In partnership with Queensland Pastoral Supplies (QPS), a company which sent mail order catalogues to country customers and with whom Alfredson had worked previously, he started manufacturing pre-cut houses. The houses, their timber bundled together and stencilled for ease of assembly, were despatched on rail cars from Cooran railway station. They were delivered with all their components from the stump caps up, with quantity lists and plans, mouldings, doors and windows, hardware and roofing.

Pre-cut houses are sometimes referred to as "prefabricated", but more advanced forms of prefabrication involve whole walls, sections, or the complete house being manufactured off the building site, before transportation and assembly on site. Although prefabricated houses represent an attempt to bring the time and cost efficiencies of the factory assembly line to the building sector, they have never been popular, other than in times of absolute necessity.

However, pre-cut (or kit) houses have been commercially successful in Australia since at least the early 20th century, perhaps because they provided an answer to labour shortages in rural areas without carrying the stigma of being fully prefabricated. One of the most successful Queensland firms supplying pre-cut houses (to country districts only) in the early 20th century was Brisbane's James Campbell & Sons Ltd; Campbell Redicut Homes was established in 1903. A Campbell's catalogue c.1920 announced that all frame timber was cut, shaped and finished to set plans. The frame was erected at Campbell & Sons' Albion mill yards to test the fit, and the timbers were marked before disassembly. All materials, including cladding and joinery (doors, window sashes, railings, steps, and mouldings) were then despatched to their destination by steamer or train.

Brown and Broad Ltd also operated in the pre-cut house market in Queensland prior to World War I, under the trade name of "Newstead Ready-to-Erect Homes", while Rooney and Co of Townsville provided pre- cut houses to North Queensland rural areas. However, the do-it- yourself trend grew after World War II, and pre-cut houses provided one answer to the high demand and high labour costs of the 1945 to 1960 period. For example, by 1952, there were about 15 local companies manufacturing pre-cut houses in Sydney. Although pre-cut houses increased in popularity, they were still only a small fraction of total Australian housing starts, and demand peaked in the early 1950s, before falling away in the late 1950s.

Queensland Pastoral Supplies does not appear to have entered the pre-cut house market until after World War II. In October 1935 the QPS catalogue had advertised building material, tools, furniture, house wares, and joinery, but no complete houses. By August 1940 houses were being advertised at prices of £150 and £205, but the timber was supplied in random lengths rather than being pre-cut. However, the 1954 QPS catalogue advertised Cooran Pre-Cut Homes, and included two articles from the 9 August 1953 edition of the Truth newspaper.

The first Truth article noted rising housing costs, and claimed that after months of planning, QPS had tackled the problem, offering a 740 square foot house for just over £800. The article also claimed that the QPS had only been manufacturing the "Cooran" home for a short period, and that a display house had been built at Dell Street in St Lucia for Exhibition Week. The materials were entirely pre-cut, so that an amateur could build the house. The "Cooran", priced at £808 in August 1953, had six rooms (including two bedrooms), and could easily be extended. The framework consisted of hardwood, the floorboards were hardwood, and the exterior was clad with hardwood weatherboards. The interior walls were clad with V-jointed pine, the ceilings with Durabestos, and the roof with English corrugated iron. The same house design clad externally with Durabestos was offered for £690. Two smaller pre-cut houses were priced at £495 and £350, and a larger "Hibiscus" home was offered for £1080. The second article in the Truth noted that every part of a Cooran home was marked, making it impossible to make a mistake during erection, and that every part of framework was morticed and tenoned where necessary.

The 1954 QPS advertisement went on to add that since Cooran homes had been introduced over 800 had been supplied. Specifications on the Cooran homes noted that the wall studs were tenoned to fit into the morticed top and bottom plates and interior sheeting could be either four and a half inch tongue and grove V-jointed pine (hoop pine), or fibro cement. The floor was made with tongue and groove seasoned hardwood, and mouldings were Queensland pine (hoop pine). Joinery could be made with cedar, oak, or maple timber. The price of a Cooran No.3 home (timber clad, either seven inch weatherboard or four inch chamferboard) was now £835; a Cooran No. 4 (Durabestos clad) was £720; and the frame alone could be purchased for £310. The two smaller one- bedroom models still sold for £350 (24 by 12 feet (7.3 m × 3.7 m)), and £495 (24 by 20 feet (7.3 m × 6.1 m) including verandah) respectively. A "Lazy Dayser" skillion-roofed weekend cottage was also advertised.

A number of models of house were produced over the years, the known ones including: Hibiscus models number 1, 2, 5, 6, 7, 8, 9 and 10; Cooran models 3, 4, 5, 6, 9, 12, 15 and 17 (model No.3 being the most popular); Tropical 1 and 2; plus garages, the one bedroom models, and the Lazy Dayser weekend cottage. There were also variants within the models – for example, models 3a to 3e.

The marketing of Alfredson's pre-cut houses through QPS catalogues reflected the housing shortage and concurrent building price increases that occurred in Australia after World War II. Thanks to a lull in house building during the Great Depression of the 1930s, there was an undersupply of houses even before World War II. National Security Regulations issued in February 1942 limited private building to projects linked to the war effort. The undersupply of houses was exacerbated after the war by returned servicemen starting families, and also by strong post-war immigration.

Prices were also driven upwards by a shortage of skilled labour, and the legislation of the 40-hour week in 1948. Another inflationary pressure was the lack of a ready stockpile of building materials. In 1939 the average five room brick house cost £1200. By 1946 this had risen to £1800; by 1951 it was over £3000. Although wages were rising, the price of an average house also increased, from three times the average pre-war income, to five times the average income by 1950.

When cost increases were combined with the Australian Government's decision to limit the area of new houses to 1200 square feet for timber and 1250 square feet for brick until 1952, the result was "Austerity" housing, and the increased use of functionalist design. Functionalism viewed the house as "a machine for living", where form followed function and efficiency was more important than ornamentation. After the war functionalism would be widely adopted out of the necessity to reduce building costs.

Austerity houses were small, with an eye to the future addition of bedrooms as families expanded. To save on the cost of building materials and labour, living rooms and dining rooms were combined into one space, entrance halls disappeared with the arrival of the L-shaped house, and verandahs shrunk to small cantilevered porches over the front door. People made do with one chimney, and pretentious ornamentation was dropped. Building materials increasingly included asbestos cement (sold by Wunderlich as "Durabestos" and James Hardie as 'Fibrolite'), and compressed fibre boards such as Masonite and Cane-ite, as well as Timbrock hardboard. In the southern states a brick veneer over a timber frame became more popular.

The emphasis was also on do-it-yourself building, as labour counted for about 50% of the cost of a house by 1948. Magazines such as "Australian Home Beautiful" catered for the proliferation of owner- builders in the 1950s, and newspapers featured stories on the housing issue and possible solutions, as can be seen by the Truth articles on Cooran homes. Between July 1951 and March 1955 around 140,000 Australian houses were owner-built; more than one third of the total.

A government response to the housing shortage was the 1945 Commonwealth State Housing Agreement, and the Queensland Housing Commission (QHC) was formed that year, tasked with building houses for rent or purchase. By 1959 the QHC had built nearly 23,000 state houses, and about 96,000 state houses were built in Australia between 1945 and 1956. The housing shortage had ended by 1960.

In response to the housing shortage, M.W. Alfredson & Company produced at least 1,200 pre-cut houses by the mid-1960s, when marketing through QPS ended. These included five houses built in Cooran, for Alfredson's staff, at 4, 5, 6 9 and 11 Henry Street; and four houses built in Cooran in the 1950s for the QHC. In 1965 a total of 62 houses were delivered to the Presbyterian Church's Weipa Mission at Cape York. Pre-cut houses had been delivered as far north as New Guinea and the Solomon Islands, and as far south as Casino, New South Wales. Western Queensland station properties might order up to five houses over a period for their workers.

Up to Mervyn Alfredson's death in 1973, about 120 houses were also custom designed, supplied and built locally, including several extant examples in Pomona: at the corner of Exhibition Street and Pavilion Street; at 7 Pine Street; and behind the Catholic Church. Alfredson died after he was hit by a falling limb from a cypress tree at Inskip Point near Rainbow Beach. Mervyn's share of the land was transferred to Mavis in 1982, and Brown's quarter share was transferred in 1985.

Mervyn and Mavis's daughter Jeanette had worked at M.W. Alfredson & Company from the time she finished school, becoming proficient in all aspects of joinery and manufacture as well as doing office work. With her mother's health failing, she gradually assumed control of the business, which concentrated on the production of specialist timber joinery and cabinet making for custom orders. Government tenders were won, especially for schools. Doors and windows were also supplied for the Public Works Department in Queensland. Over the years a large number of people from Cooran and nearby towns were employed by M.W. Alfredson & Company. At its peak the business employed 32 men, plus logging contractors, carriers and subcontractors, and over 60 apprentices learnt their trade in the factory.

A weatherboard clad building at 32 King Street, with folding garage doors and a saw tooth roof, was constructed in 1962 as an office for Jeanette Alfredson, and was known as the "front office" of the joinery. Behind the office was an area for sharpening tools, and underneath were quarters for the single men. Part of the building was used as a garage, and it still has a maintenance pit in the floor under a trapdoor. This building is not included within the heritage boundary.

After Jeanette retired, the land was sold to Kesselwood Pty Ltd in March 1991 and to Kidman's Pty Ltd shortly thereafter. In 1997 the 37.7 perches (950 m^{2}) of land purchased by Mervyn Alfredson in 1933 (allotment 38) was split 50–50 between Kidman Pty Ltd and Marbelle Pty Ltd, while Kidman Pty Limited continued to hold all of Lot 41 (Alfredson's 1942 land purchase). In 1998 the total acreage previously owned by Alfredson was subdivided into its current configuration. Alfredson's complex now stands on lot 42, a combination of former lots 38 and 41 that has been fully owned by Marbelle Pty Ltd since 1998.

In 2007 Alan Guymer operates a traditional joinery workshop on the former pre-cut house workshop (underneath and to the south of the former joinery), although his main business is building and demolition. The current machinery within and under the pre-cut house workshop, and most of the machinery in the sawmill section, was introduced by Alan. An original log carriage and its metal rails is still in situ in the rear sawmill shed, and original timber rails survive running north–south along the floor of the pre-cut house workshop, along with some metal gantry rails running east–west across the ceiling.

The top level of the building, the former joinery, is now called the Cooran Trading Post and Second-Hand Dealers (furniture). The shop still contains a lathe which is supported on concrete piers under the floor. There is no internal stairway between the former upper and lower workshops. Many of the building's stumps have been replaced by Alan over the years, and since 1990 he has also enclosed parts of a skillion roofed extension to the building west of the pre-cut house workshop.

== Description ==
A long, rambling timber and corrugated iron building sheltered by a combination of gable, sawtooth and skillion roofs, the former joinery complex steps down the slope from a ridge along King Street at the northwest end of Cooran. The property is set against a backdrop of treed mountains and grassed paddocks to the south, has small scale domestic/commercial buildings adjacent and overlooks the railway to the north. The building now accommodates an antique shop at street level and a joinery workshop and timber working areas below.

Approximately 65 metres (213 ft) long and 13 metres (43 ft) wide with a truncation to the northeast, the building is organised over three levels – the former joinery workshop at street level, the former pre-cut house fabrication workshop to the middle and the sawmilling area at the lower level. The former joinery complex is notable for the range of timbers used in the construction of the various parts of the building ranging from sawn and dressed timbers to logs retaining their bark.

The joinery workshop is sheltered by a large gable roof clad with corrugated iron and has a small barrel roofed rectangular lantern along the ridge towards the rear. The workshop is timber framed, clad with a single skin of oiled weatherboards and supported on high round timber stumps set into the dirt floor below. The main entrance is through wide double timber doors off the truncated side to King Street. A sign above the main entrance says 'Alfredson's'. A smaller double timber door opens off the north corner of the building. There is a rear exit at a set of timber stairs descending from the southeast corner. Exposed timber trusses support the roof and the workshop has a fine tongue and groove timber floor. A line of single skin timber partitions divides the space along the west side. The workshop is lit from each side by a range of window types and styles including sash and casement. A lathe from the early joinery workshop stands to the centre of the space and is supported on a concrete base rising up from the dirt floor below. There is a small projecting alcove to each of the long elevations. Sprinklers are installed within the roof framing. The understorey has a dirt floor and is enclosed with vertical timber boards and sheets of corrugated iron. It accommodates storage areas, timber storage racks, a range of tools and equipment and the concrete base of the lathe.

A grass and dirt driveway sloping down the property along the west side gives access to the middle and lower levels of the complex. This driveway is also part of the easement shared with the adjoining property. A lean-to garage/loading dock and office stands approximately 15 metres (49 ft) down the slope and extends down this side of the building to the end of the former pre-fabrication workshop which it opens into. Sheltered by a skillion roof, timber framed and standing on tall round timber stumps, the loading/office area is partly enclosed to the west with a range of cladding materials including weatherboards and corrugated iron sheeting. A single-skin weatherboard clad partition separates the loading/office area from the pre-fabrication workshop. The pre-fabrication workshop is sheltered by two roofs – a sawtooth roof throwing southern light into the northern end of the space and a skillion roof to the balance. Timber framed, the workshop has exposed dressed timber trusses, sawn timber framing to the skillion roof, rough log beams and a steel beam across the south end. Rows of round timber posts support the roofs and the workshop stands on high round timber stumps. Enclosed to the east with vertical timber boards and open to the south, the workshop has a fine timber tongue and groove floor with a set of timber rails running along the centre of the floor to the narrow loading platform to the south. A trolley with metal wheels runs on the rails. Two sets of timber stairs descend to the sawmilling area to the rear of the complex. The understorey of the pre-fabrication workshop houses various pieces of equipment and timber storage and is enclosed to the southeast by corrugated metal sheeting.

The sawmilling area, which includes timber storage/loading and log working sections, is level with the driveway on the west side and has an elevated platform to the east. It is sheltered by a metal trussed skillion roof and houses a log carriage and breakdown saw sheltered by a low narrow barrel roof to the upper level. The log carriage and saw are operational and the carriage has rails and a trolley. A small timber shed houses the recently introduced four-sider machine.

The timber loading area, log working area, understoreys to the loading/office, pre-fabrication workshop and the joinery workshop now accommodate various pieces of timber working equipment introduced by the present owner and are used for storage of timber, joinery items and a range of equipment and parts.

== Heritage listing ==
Alfredson's Joinery, Pre-Cut House Workshop and Sawmill was listed on the Queensland Heritage Register on 27 November 2008 having satisfied the following criteria.

The place is important in demonstrating the evolution or pattern of Queensland's history.

Alfredson's Joinery, built and expanded between 1933 and the 1950s, is important surviving evidence of the timber industry in the Noosa Shire and the North Coast (now Sunshine Coast) region. The timber industry played a major economic role in the history of the North Coast region, which from the 1860s was one of the most important timber producing regions in Queensland. Alfredson's is important evidence of the manufacturing aspect of the area's timber industry from the 1930s to the 1980s. Its location at Cooran was close to timber supplies, and the adjacent railway facilitated the shipment of the joinery's products.

The establishment by Alfredson's of a pre-cut timber house fabrication workshop in the early 1950s is representative of the response of timber firms to the Australia-wide post-World War II housing shortage.

The place demonstrates rare, uncommon or endangered aspects of Queensland's cultural heritage.

In the first half of the 20th century, the milling of timber and the manufacture of timber products was an integral component of the North Coast timber industry, a major industry for Queensland. Alfredson's Joinery complex is a rare surviving example of the pre-World War II era of sawmilling and joinery operations on the North Coast, and is also a rare example of a post-World War II pre-cut house workshop. The lathe and log carriage are important as rare surviving equipment from those operations.

The place is important in demonstrating the principal characteristics of a particular class of cultural places.

In its layout the Alfredson's Joinery complex is important in demonstrating the linear operation of a timber manufacturing process. This is evident in the planning and organisation of the sawmilling and pre-fabrication workshop where timber was unloaded and worked in the sawmilling area and then moved by trolley to the fabrication area where the timber passed through a number of bench and cutting processes. The finished fabricated components were then dispatched through the western loading dock. The construction of sawtooth roofs to the prefabrication workshop and lantern to the joinery workshop are good examples of the standard design practice of introducing as much daylight as possible into workshop spaces, particularly southern light in the case of the sawtooth roofs.
