= Shadow of a Pale Horse (The United States Steel Hour) =

- The United States Steel Hour episode
- Episode no.: Season 7 Episode 23
- Directed by: Jack Smight
- Teleplay by: Jack Palmer
- Based on: Shadow of a Pale Horse by Bruce Stewart
- Original air date: July 27, 1960
- Running time: 60 mins

Guest appearance
- Dan Duryea

"Shadow of a Pale Horse" is a television play that aired as part of The United States Steel Hour on CBS on July 27, 1960. Although adapted by Jack Palmer from Bruce Stewart's original script, the Australian setting was kept.

== Cast ==
- Dan Duryea
- Frank Lovejoy
- Carroll O'Connor

== Reception ==
The Washington Post called it a "stimulating, above average production". The New York Times called it "an unusual story, enhanced by a good production".

The United States Steel Hour would later film another Bruce Stewart play The Devil Makes Sunday.
