= Eliza Fraser =

British shipwreck survivor

Eliza Anne Fraser
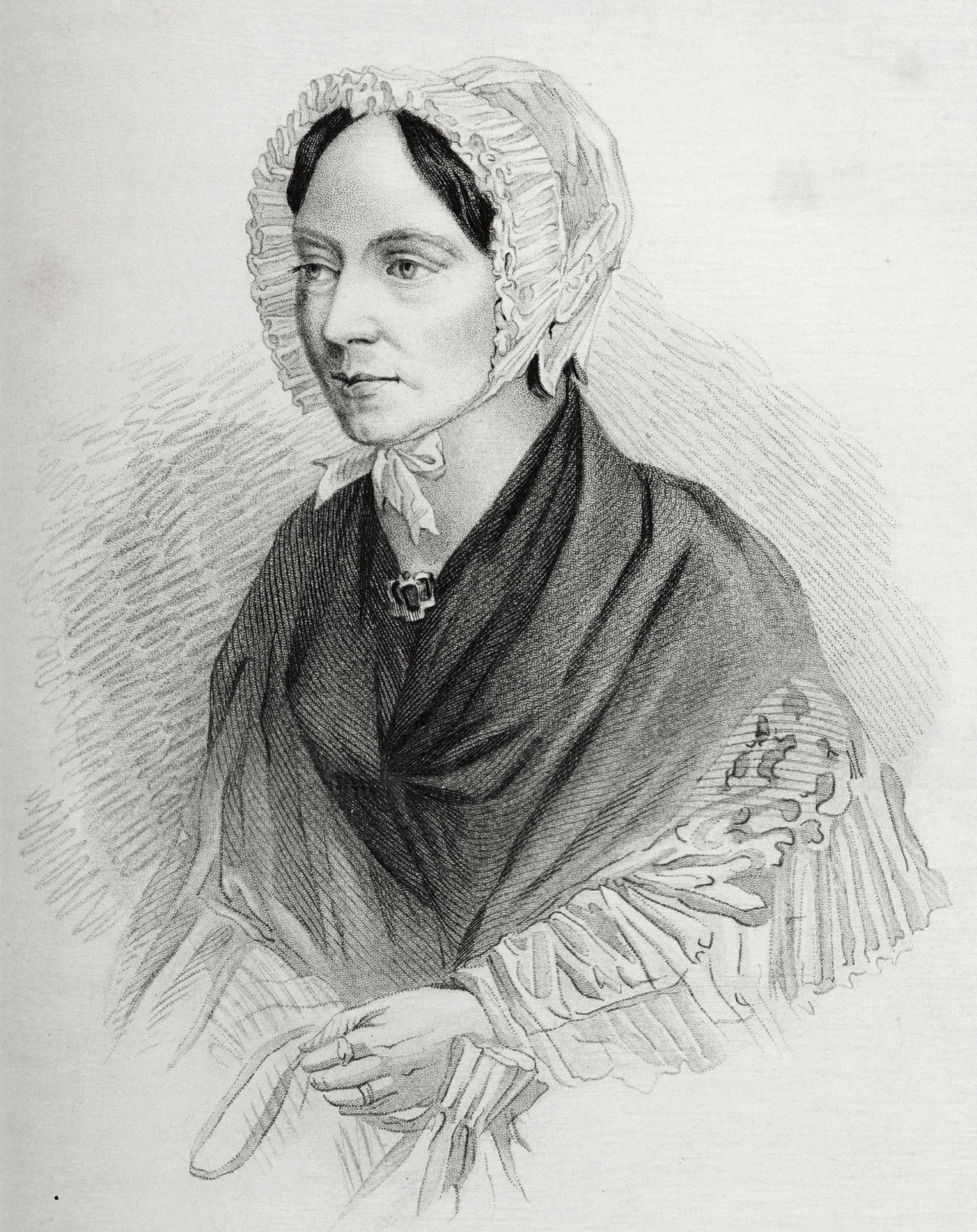
- Sketch of Eliza Fraser
- Born: Eliza Anne Slack c. 1798; Wirksworth, Derbyshire, Great Britain
- Died: 1858 (age about 60); Melbourne, Victoria, Australia
- Spouse(s): Captain James Fraser (c. 1821 – c. 1836); Captain Alexander Greene (1837–?)
- Children: 3

Eliza Anne Fraser (née Slack; c. 1798 – 1858) was an English woman known for being shipwrecked at K'gari, an island off the coast of Queensland, Australia, on 22 May 1836. After being rescued from the island, she spoke and wrote of her experiences, including claims of being captured and enslaved by "Indians", native Butchalla people. The island was renamed 'Fraser Island', in honour of her deceased husband Captain James Fraser. It was renamed to its traditional name of K'gari in June 2023.

Home of Eliza Fraser and detail of attached commemorative plaque, in Stromness, Orkney

== Life ==
She was the wife of Captain James Fraser, master of the brig Stirling Castle. There were 18 people aboard the ship and a cargo mainly of spirits, which may have been involved in the accident. They struck a reef hundreds of kilometres north of K'gari Island. They then launched a longboat and a pinnace, the latter of which landed on the northern side of Waddy Point on K'gari Island. The 11 survivors split up into two groups, Eliza and her husband in the second group, and attempted to trek south, surviving on pandanus and berries until they reached Hook Point. Eliza later claimed she was captured by the Badtjala; her husband either died from starvation or from his injuries. Many other survivors of the same ship wreck later disputed Eliza's claims of capture and ill treatment. Other white people had previously been taken in by the Badtjala and had been treated well. Badtjala oral history tells that Eliza was viewed as a "mad woman" and mentally unwell. Eliza Fraser's claim eventually led to the massacre and dispossession of the island's tribe.

Eliza was found by John Graham, an escaped Irish convict who had lived for six years with the natives of Wide Bay and had mastered their language. Whether John Graham acted alone in rescuing Eliza is a matter of some conjecture. For many years her rescuer was thought to have been another escaped convict, David Bracewell (though sometimes reported as Bracefell or Bracefield). Bracewell became the rescuer in later accounts, enhanced by the fictional tale that Bracewell had led Eliza overland to the outskirts of present-day Brisbane where, rather than as promised, seeking his pardon in return for his assistance, she threatened to betray him for having taken advantage of her. Official records show, to the contrary, that it was the convict John Graham who walked with her from Fig Tree Point, a corroboree ground near Lake Cootharaba north of present-day Noosa, onto the ocean beach near present-day Teewah. Here they met the waiting Lieutenant Otter and his small band of soldiers and convict volunteers. They proceeded north along the beach to the main rescue party waiting at Double Island Point from where Eliza was taken by longboat to the penal settlement at Moreton Bay.

Eliza later secretly married another sea captain (Captain Alexander Greene) in Sydney and they both returned to England aboard his ship, the Mediterranean Packet. Controversy followed when she appeared before the Lord Mayor of London to request that a charity appeal be set up for her three children as she was left penniless after her husband had died, not mentioning her marriage to Captain Greene or the £400 received in Sydney by a fund set up to help her. Sensationalised accounts of her experience were published in London.

Information about Fraser is on display at Stromness Museum.

== Cultural references ==
Patrick White wrote a fictionalised account of the incident in the 1976 novel A Fringe of Leaves. Others who wrote her story include André Brink, Kenneth Cook and Michael Ondaatje.

Her life was dramatised in the BBC radio drama Time of the Serpent.

Sidney Nolan painted a wide range of personal interpretations of historical and legendary figures, including Eliza Fraser. The Eliza Fraser story was a theme to which Nolan returned over the years. His first Mrs. Fraser painting was in 1947 when he visited K'gari. The crouching, bedraggled form with downcast head obscured by matted hair is one of his best known images. Over the years Nolan emphasised the Bracefell (as he called Bracewell) betrayal story, and his iconic Fraser image has become emblematic of what he saw as his betrayal by close friend and arts patron Sunday Reed.

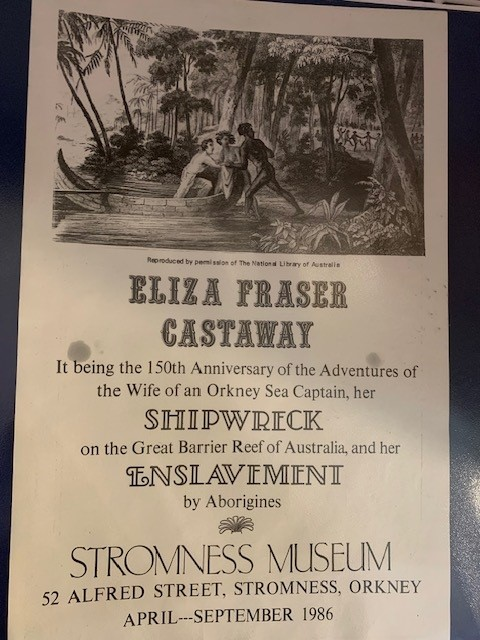
Poster for Eliza Fraser Exhibit at Stromness Museum

In 1976 a drama film titled Eliza Fraser (The Adventures of Eliza Fraser was an alternate title) was made about her. Susannah York played the title role, and the film was directed by Tim Burstall. It was the first Australian film with a seven-figure budget, costing $1.2 million to make.

== See also ==
- White woman of Gippsland
- William Buckley (convict)

== Bibliography ==
- Australian Dictionary of Biography: Fraser, Eliza Anne (1798-1858)
- Alexander, Michael (2001), Mrs. Fraser on the Fatal Shore, London Phoenix, ISBN 978-1-84212-454-3 First published by Michael Joseph, 1971.
- Brown, Elaine (1994). "The Legend of Eliza Frazer : A Survey of The Sources". Journal of the Royal Historical Society of Queensland. 15 (7): 345–360. ISSN 0085-5804.
- Ewan, Elizabeth; Innes, Sue; Reynolds, Sian; Pipes, Rose (2006). The Biographical Dictionary of Scottish Women. Edinburgh University Press. p. 126. ISBN 0748626603.
- Goldie, Terry (1989). Fear and Temptation: The Image of the Indigene in Canadian, Australian, and New Zealand Literatures. Toronto: McGill-Queens University Press.
- Russell, Lynette, et al., eds (1998). Constructions of Colonialism: Perspectives on Eliza Fraser's Shipwreck. Wellington: Leicester University Press.
