= Inskip, Queensland =

Suburb of Gympie Region, Australia

Inskip
- Suburb
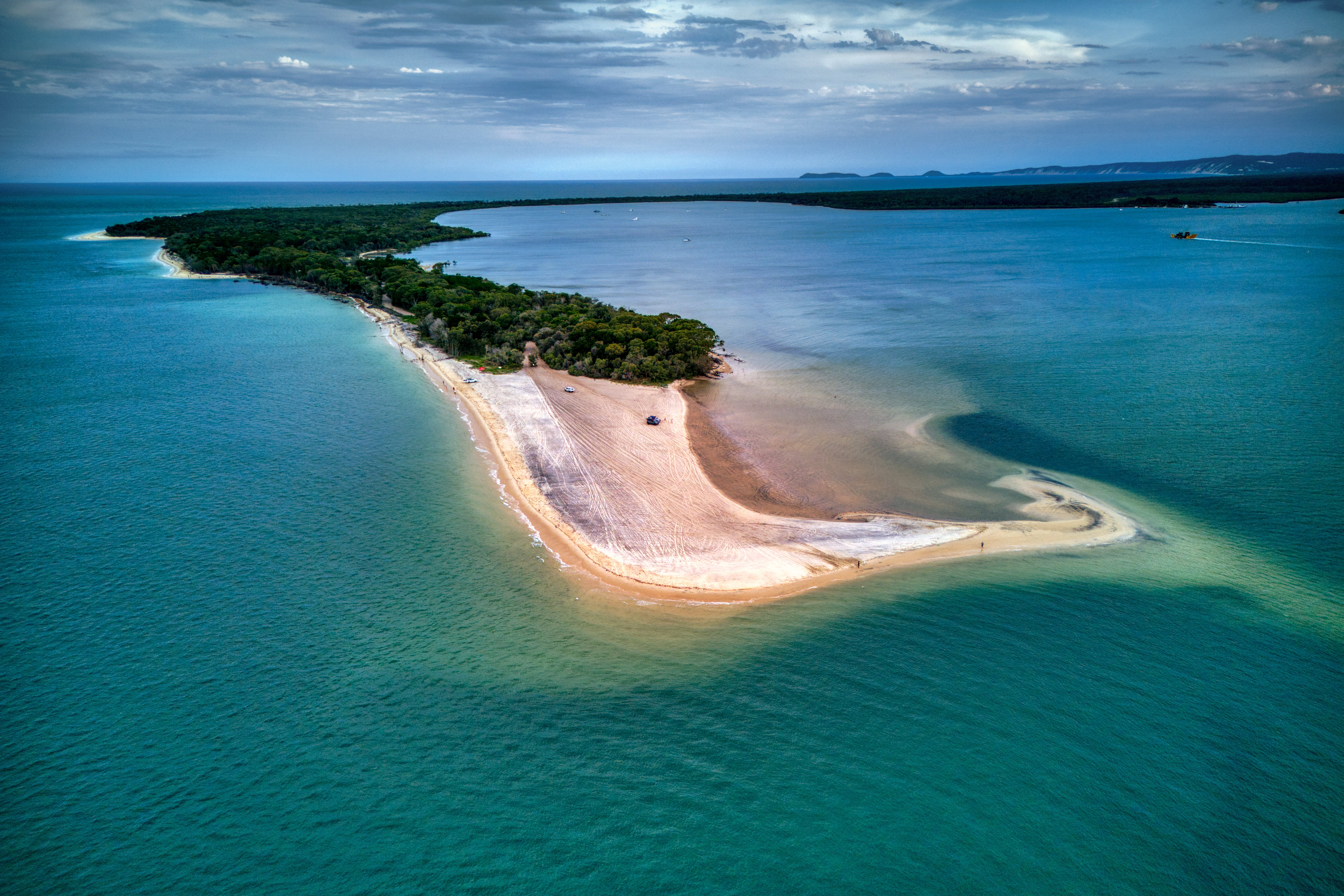
- Inskip Point

- Interactive map of Inskip
- Coordinates: 25.8597°S 153.0666°E
- Country: Australia
- State: Queensland
- LGA: Gympie Region
- Location: 13.0 km (8.1 mi) N of Rainbow Beach; 51.4 km (31.9 mi) NE of Tin Can Bay; 86.6 km (53.8 mi) NE of Gympie; 263 km (163 mi) N of Brisbane

Government
  - State electorate: Gympie
  - Federal division: Wide Bay

Area
  - Total: 35.7 km^{2} (13.8 sq mi)
- Elevation: 6 m (20 ft)

Population
  - Total: 22 (2021 census)
  - Density: 0.616/km^{2} (1.60/sq mi)
- Time zone: UTC+10:00 (AEST)
- Postcode: 4581
Suburbs around Inskip
Great Sandy Strait	Great Sandy Strait	Coral Sea
Tin Can Bay	Inskip	Coral Sea
Tin Can Bay	Cooloola	Rainbow Beach

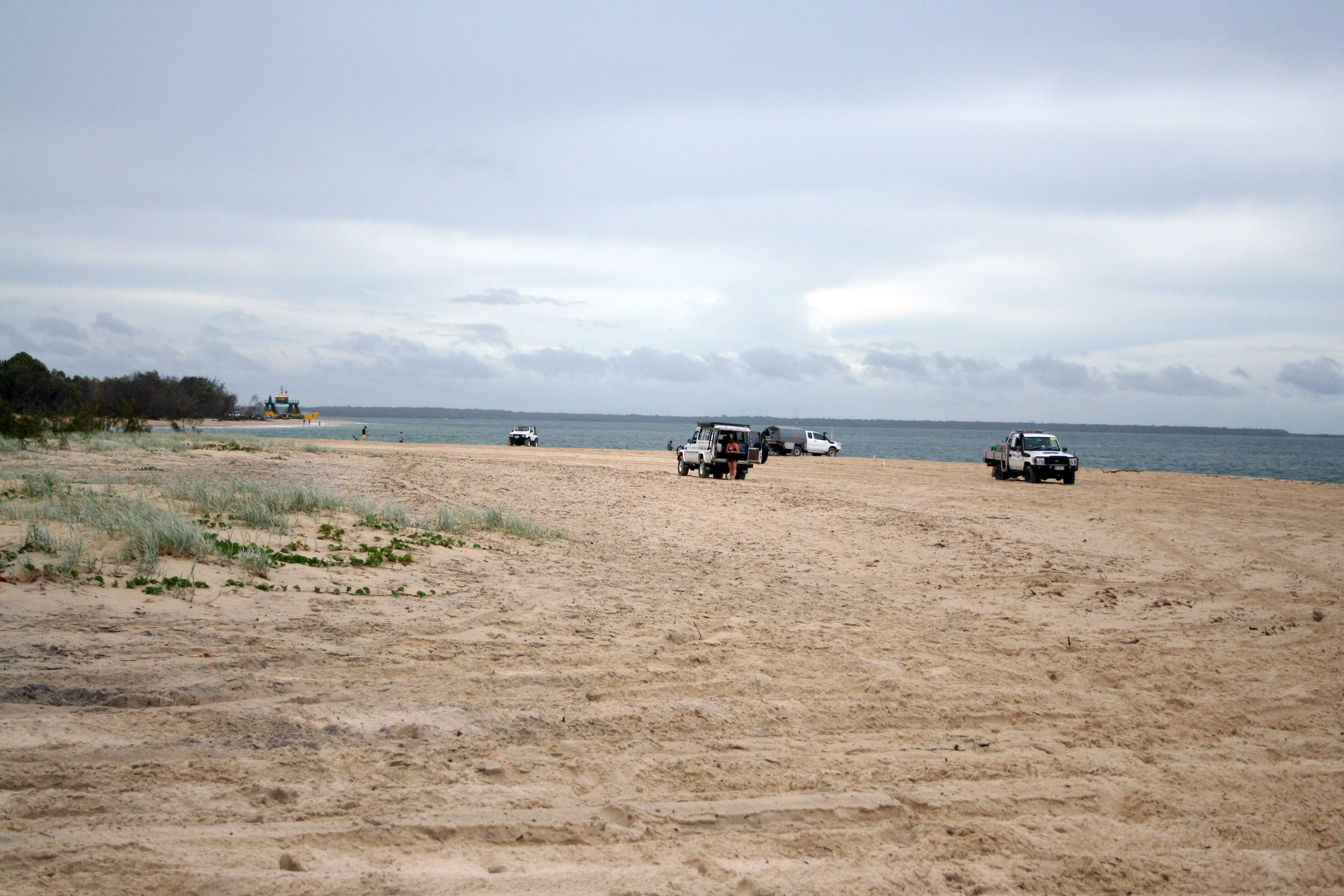
4WDs waiting at Inskip Point for the barge for Fraser Island, 2009

Inskip is a coastal locality in the Gympie Region, Queensland, Australia. Inskip Point at the north of the locality is a vehicular gateway to Fraser Island (also known as K'Gari and Gari). In the 2021 census, Inskip had a population of 22 people.

== Geography ==
Inskip is a peninsula that separates Wide Bay and Tin Can Inlet from the Coral Sea. Inskip Point is its northernmost point (25.8127°S 153.0703°E) and is 1.2 kilometres (0.75 mi) south from the southern tip of Fraser Island, making it a major gateway to the island via vehicular barges. There are camping grounds in Inskip and two boat ramps, horse trails and other outdoor recreational facilities.

Rainbow Beach airfield is within the locality (25.8525°S 153.0695°E).

== History ==
Inskip Point Provisional School opened circa 1884 and closed circa 1893. It reopened circa 1895, closing permanently circa 1896.

In 2011, a large sinkhole consumed much of the beach at Inskip Point, with the hole size estimated at 100 m+ long and 50 m+ deep.

In September 2015, a large sinkhole opened up near Rainbow Beach, affecting campers along Inskip Point. Fishermen were the first to notice the shoreline quickly receding into the ocean around 10:30 pm. One witness described the opening of the sinkhole as "sounded like a thunder noise" while another said "it was amazing to see". The sinkhole was 150 metres long, 50 metres wide and three metres deep. The sinkhole swallowed up one car, a caravan, a camper trailer and several tents. 140 people were evacuated from the campground, but no injuries were reported. Most of the campers were able to move their vehicles out of harm's way before their campsites were submerged in water.

== Demographics ==
In the 2016 census, Inskip had a population of 52 people.

In the 2021 census, Inskip had a population of 22 people.

== Education ==
There are no schools in Inskip. The nearest government primary school is Rainbow Beach State School in neighbouring Rainbow Beach to the south-east. The nearest government secondary school is Tin Can Bay State School (to Year 10) in Tin Can Bay to the south-west. For secondary schooling to Year 12, the nearest government secondary school is Gympie State High School in Gympie to the south-west.

== Amenities ==
There is a barge/boat ramp with floating walkway at Bullock Point (25.8273°S 153.0544°E). It is managed by the Gympie Regional Council.

== Attractions ==
Scenic helicopter flights operate from the airfield.
