= First Night (TV series) =

British television contemporary drama anthology series (1963–1964)

First Night is a BBC series of contemporary television dramas by new writers, which ran from September 1963 to May 1964 and was the forerunner of The Wednesday Play. The series was produced by James MacTaggart.

Only a single episode (Maggie) is known to exist, as well as the opening segment of Veronica which was rediscovered in 2025 by Film Is Fabulous. The rest of the series, including The Road, is considered lost.

== Notable episodes ==
- Nigel Kneale's The Road
- Simon Raven's The Scapegoat
- Day of the Drongo
