= Time of the Serpent =

Time of the Serpent is a 1958 British radio play by Bruce Stewart about Eliza Fraser, an English woman who survived being shipwrecked at K'gari island off the coast of Queensland in 1836. It was one of Stewart's first radio plays in England. He also appeared in the production.

Practical Wireless called it "an original and refreshing play".

He wrote it as a stage play.

== Original cast ==
- Joan Hart as Mrs Fraser:
- Andrew Sachs as Lieutenant Rettar
- Frank Windsor as Captain Marston
- Stephen Jack as Johnny, an aborigine
- Jack MacGowran as Bracefell, a convict
- Bruce Stewart as The Storyteller
