= Low Voice in Rama =

1960 British radio play by Bruce Stewart

Low Voice in Rama is a 1960 British radio play by Bruce Stewart.

The play was produced for Australian radio in 1961.

== Premise ==
A crashed plane is discovered in the Australian desert with two dead bodies and one survivor.
