= Yurol railway station =

Railway station in Queensland, Australia

Yurol

General information
- Location: Elm Street, Cooroy; Australia
- Owner: Queensland Rail
- Line: North Coast
- Distance: 134.49 kilometres from Central
- Platforms: 1
- Tracks: 2

Construction
- Structure type: Ground

Other information
- Status: abandoned

History
- Opened: 1912
- Closed: 1963
- Rebuilt: 1931 (major expansion)
- Electrified: 1915 (Telegraph); 1925 (whole site)

Services
Preceding station	Queensland Rail	Following station
Cooroy towards Brisbane	North Coast line	Pomona towards Gympie North
Location

Yurol railway station
- Location within Queensland Location within Australia
- 26°23′37″S 152°53′11″E
- Location: Elm Street, Cooroy, Shire of Noosa, Queensland, Australia

History
- Design period: 1912
- Built: 1912
- Built for: Department of Railways

Site notes
- Architect: Office of the Chief Engineer of Queensland Rail
- Owner: Queensland Government

Yurol railway station is a former railway station at on Elm Street, Cooroy, Shire of Noosa, Queensland, Australia. It is on the North Coast railway line serving the area of Yurol. It was designed by the Office of the Chief Engineer of Queensland Rail and upgraded by the Department of Railways including a siding and level crossing in 1915 following its original construction in 1912 with significant input from the Noosa Council. Originally called Thorley's Siding it was renamed to Yurol Siding in 1915 and was equipped with interlocking gear and used as a Telegraph station.

== History ==
Ordinally called Thorley's Siding from 1912, it was renamed to Yurol Siding in 1915. The name 'Yurol' was approved by the Queensland Government on 23 May 1913 and means "Scrub Vine". The permanently staffed facility was equipped with interlocking gear and used as a Telegraph station prior to the telegraph station being installed at the Cooroy railway station.

On 25 November 1919, at 3:25am an empty goods carriage derailed with only a minor interruption to the mainline.

In 1925, the disused night officers building at the North Arm train station was moved to Yurol for use by the rail gang that was preparing the site for electricity.

On 9 October 1929, the Noosa Council insisted that the road connecting Cooroy to the new station not include a level crossing due to the dangers associated with them. However the Chief Engineer said as part of the works two roads would be constructed from the Six Mile Creek Bridge to the station and include a direct road between Cooroy and Pomona which is now Yurol Forest Drive.

On 11 October 1929, a notice for the resumption of land was posted in the Noosa Advocate and Cooroora Advertiser regarding land resumptions for the new railway station at the existing Yurol Siding. Yurol station was located approximately 3.5 kilometres north of the Cooroy railway station along the North Coast Line and serviced the area of Yurol, which is now an extension of greater Cooroy. The site location is the south entrance into the Yurol Forest which in part is now part of the Tewantin National Park. The railway station land was resumed from the Yurol station, with an agreement that a level crossing be made for the dwelling occupants on what would become Elm Street.

On 2 June 1931, the Minister for Railways Godfrey Morgan, MLA, announced the upgrade of Yurol Siding to include a formal railway station for public use. This also including a level crossing for access from Cooroy.

On 10 June 1933, the Evening News of Rockhampton reported that train jumpers had increased at the Pomona railway station and the Yurol station.

On 29 December 1933, subsiding took place under the track just north of the station due to heavy rain. This resulted in the temporary closure of the North Coast Line and a passenger train being held in Eumundi. A goods train travelling north was stopped at Cooroy for waggons of ashes to be added at the front to be used in repairing the line.

By 1935 the station and siding was a major part of the rail network as sleepers were made onsite and transported around the South East for use in construction of the greater state-wide rail network.

Between 1940-41 permanently staffed stations were established for better use of the railway resulting in the closure of Yurol station for public use. Up until this point, Yurol was however already a staffed station.

The signals were removed in 1945 and operated as only a siding.

On 28 February 1950, 50 yards of the line subsided due to heavy rain.

== See also ==
- Queensland Rail City network
- TransLink (Queensland)
