= Moonfall (radio play) =

- Genre: drama play
- Running time: 60 mins (8:00 pm – 9:00 pm)
- Country of origin: United Kingdom
- Language: English
- Syndicates: BBC
- Written by: Bruce Stewart
- Directed by: David Godfrey
- Original release: January 15, 1959

Moonfall was a 1959 British radio play by Bruce Stewart about an American rocket trip to the moon, that leaves from Australia. It was an early science fiction work from Stewart who developed a strong reputation in that field in television. Like many of Stewart's early British work it was set in the Antipodes.

The play was performed in New Zealand radio in 1959 and 1961.

== Cast of 1959 BBC Production ==
- John Hollis as Casey
- Frederick Schiller as Dr Bauer
- John Cazabon as Lewis
- Sheila Grant as Dora
- MacDonald Parke as General Race
- June Tobin as Gloria
- Alexander Gray as Eric Wilson
- Jane Jordan Rogers as Linda Everet
- Hugh Manning as Dr John Fanshawe
- Stuart Nichol as Dr Oakie
- Ronald Wilson as Dr Peter Hartley
