= Inskip Point =

Peninsula in Australia

Coordinates: 25°51′11″S 153°03′54″E

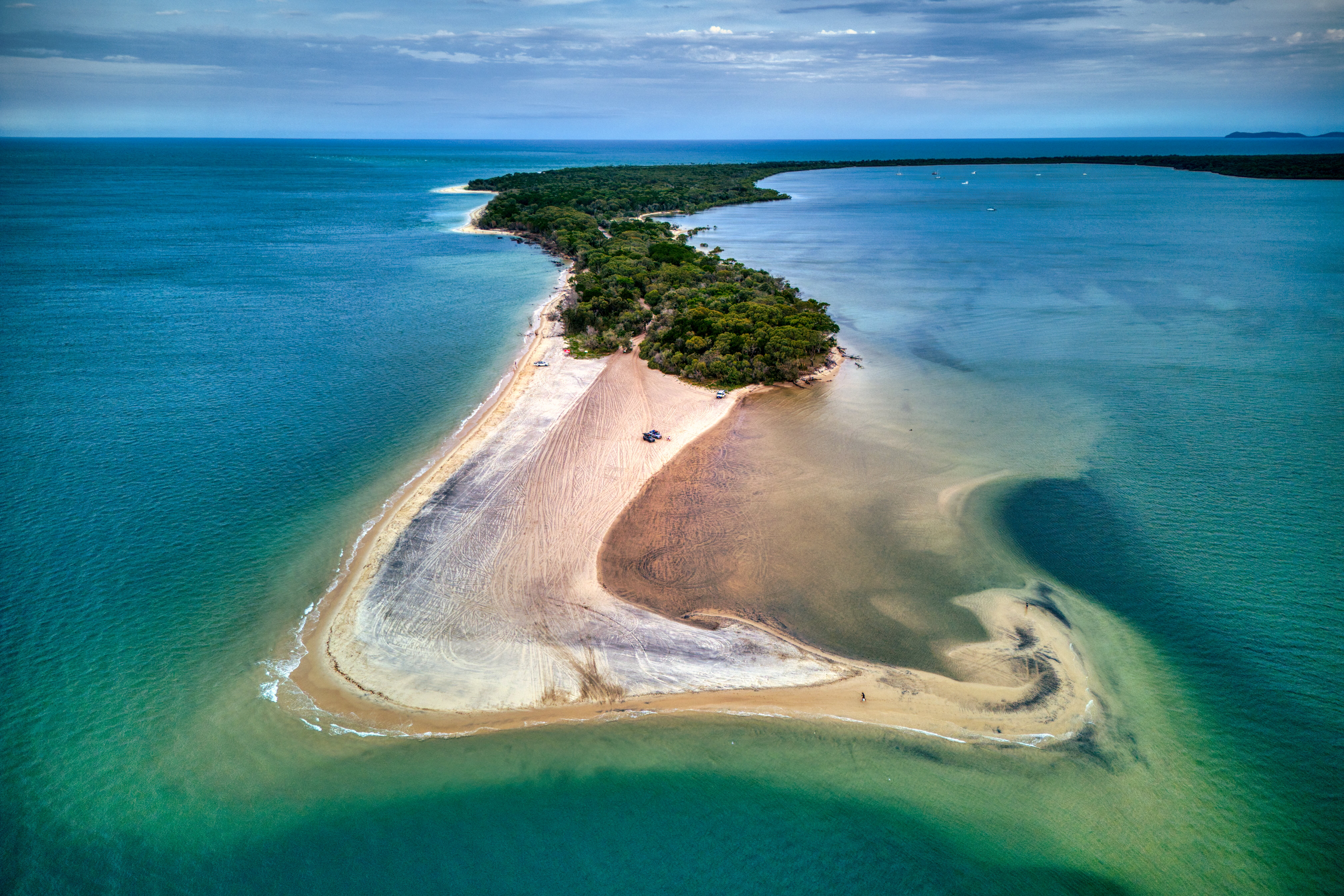
Inskip Point, Queensland

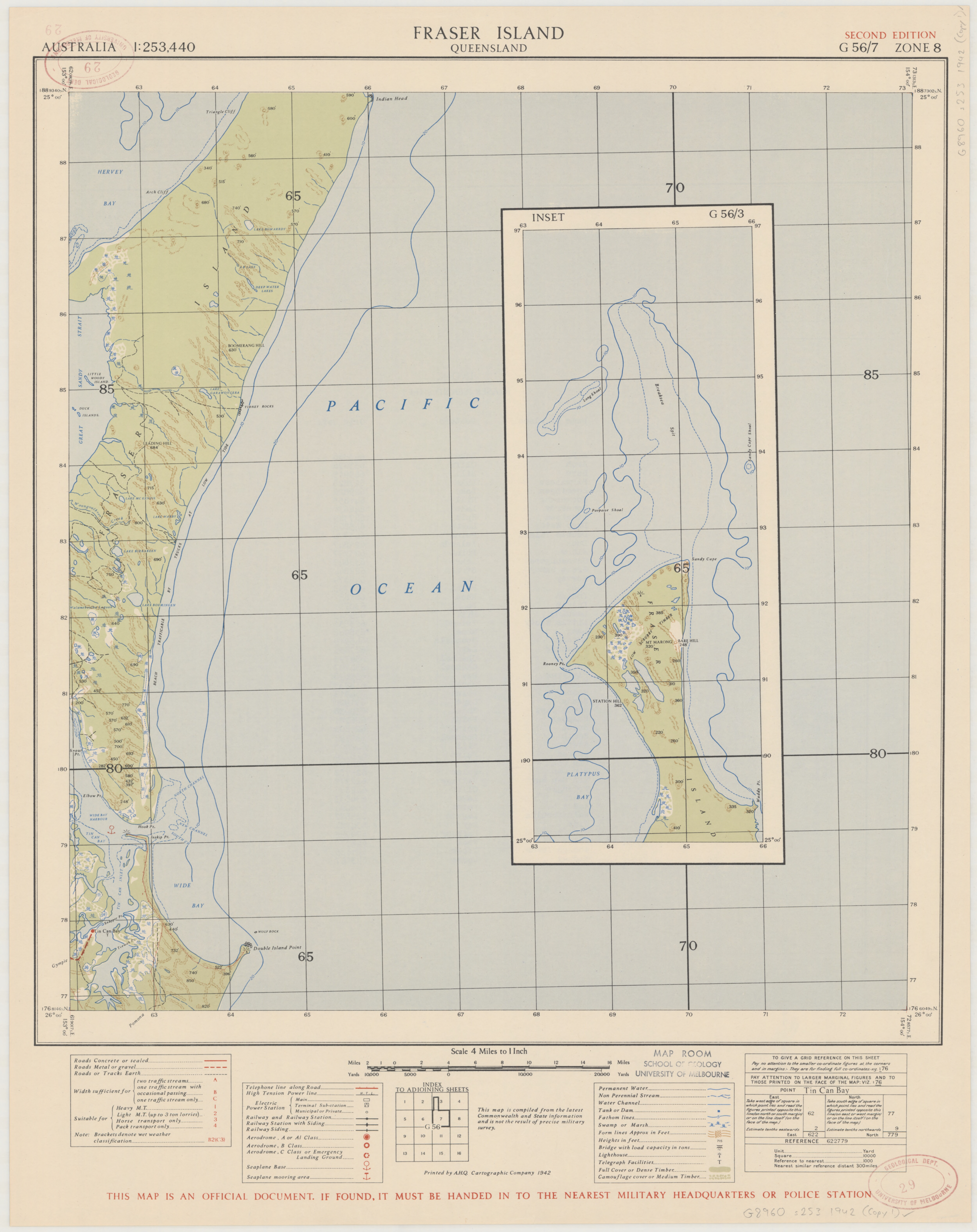
Inskip Point is shown on Topo map sheet of Fraser Island, just south of Hook Point

Inskip Point is a peninsula in the north of the locality of Inskip to the north of the town of Rainbow Beach in south-east Queensland, Australia. It is the vehicular gateway to K'Gari (formerly known as Fraser Island) via a barge service.

The area became notorious for its near-shore landslides in which the beach collapses into the ocean. The worst event occurred in 2015 when campsites, cars and trailers fell into the ocean.

== Geography ==
It lies between Tin Can Bay to the South West and Great Sandy Strait to the North and curves back towards Rainbow Beach and the Coral Sea to the East.

The southern tip of Fraser Island, Hook Point lies some 1,200 metres north of Inskip Point, the northern tip of the peninsula. Two ferry services run between Inskip Point and Hook Point during daylight hours.

== Fauna ==
The black-breasted buttonquail, a restricted-range endemic buttonquail, was once found in sand-dunes on the peninsula. In 2013, only one remained. Mike West, former president of Birds Queensland, blamed dingoes and wild dogs for hunting the population to extinction. West proposed trapping dingoes and wild dogs, setting them free if they are pure dingoes and killing them if they are not.
