= Cooroy railway station =

Railway station in Queensland, Australia

Cooroy
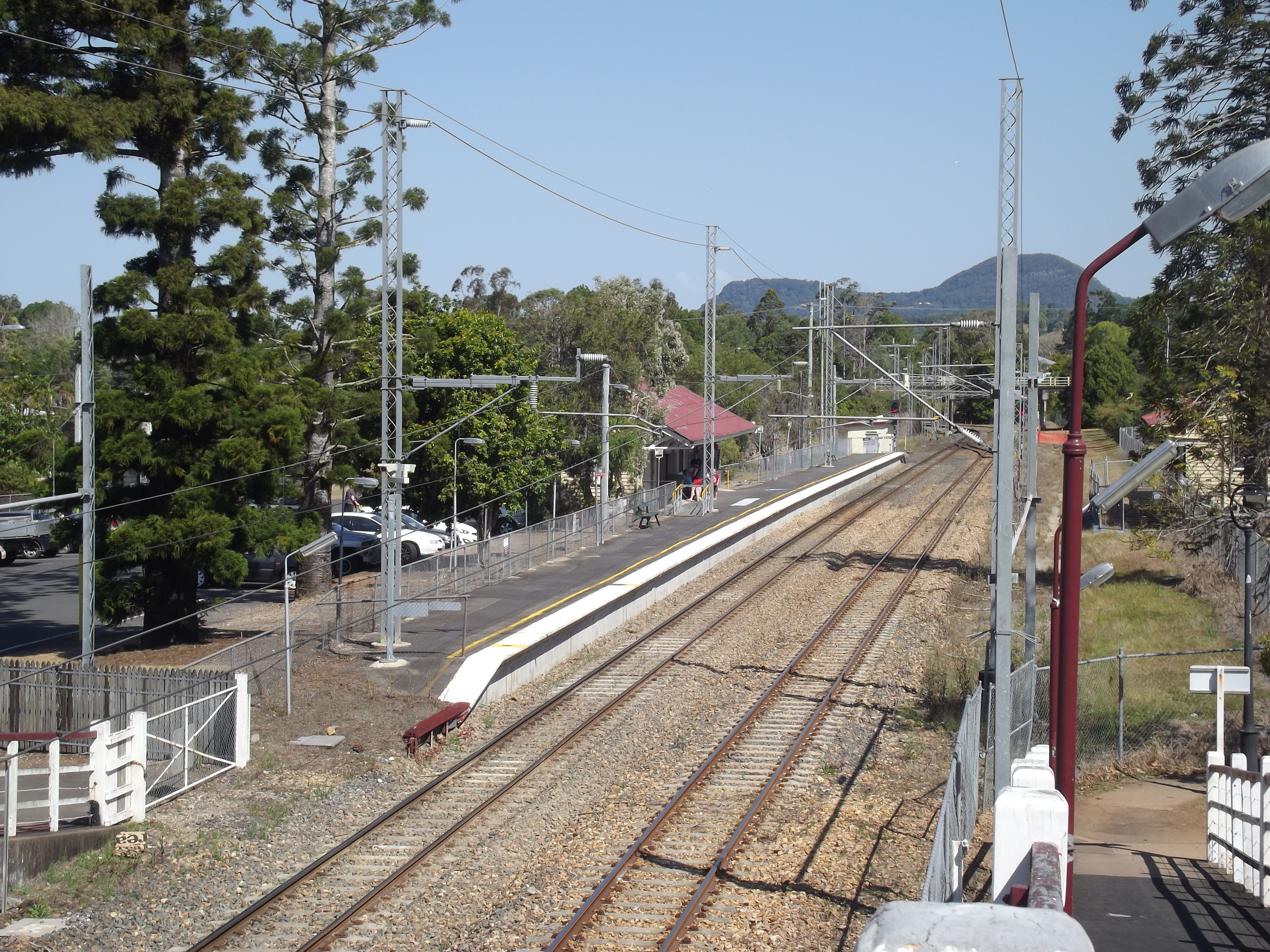
- Southbound view of the station platform in September 2012

General information
- Location: Elm Street, Cooroy
- Coordinates: 26°25′03″S 152°54′40″E
- Owner: Queensland Rail
- Operator: Queensland Rail
- Lines: T1 Nambour/Gympie North; Tilt Train; Spirit of the Outback; Spirit of Queensland
- Distance: 130.99 kilometres from Central
- Platforms: 1
- Tracks: 2

Construction
- Structure type: Ground
- Parking: 100 spaces

Other information
- Status: Staffed morning peak
- Station code: 600496
- Fare zone: Zone 8
- Website: Queensland Rail

History
- Opened: 17 July 1891

Services
Preceding station	Queensland Rail	Following station
Eumundi towards Roma Street	Gympie North service	Pomona towards Gympie North
Long-distance services
Nambour towards Brisbane	Spirit of Queensland	Gympie North towards Cairns
Nambour towards Brisbane	Tilt Train	Gympie North towards Rockhampton
Nambour towards Brisbane	Spirit of the Outback	Gympie North towards Longreach
Location

Cooroy is a railway station operated by Queensland Rail on the Nambour/Gympie North line. It opened in 1891 and serves the Noosa town of Cooroy. It is a ground level station, featuring one side platform.

Long-distance services on the North Coast line, including the Spirit of Queensland, Tilt Train and Spirit of the Outback, stop at Cooroy.

== Services ==
Cooroy is serviced by two daily Citytrain network services in each direction.

Cooroy is also served by long-distance Traveltrain services; the Spirit of Queensland, Spirit of the Outback and the Bundaberg and Rockhamption Tilt Trains.

From 1912–1963, the Yurol railway station was the next station north of Cooroy, after its closure, the Pomona railway station became the next station heading north.

== Platforms and services ==
Cooroy platform arrangement
Platform	Line	Destination	Notes
1	T1 Nambour/Gympie North	Gympie North	
1	T1 Nambour/Gympie North	Roma Street (to Ipswich/Rosewood line)	
1	Spirit of Queensland	Cairns	
1	Spirit of Queensland	Roma Street	
1	Spirit of the Outback	Longreach	
1	Spirit of the Outback	Roma Street	
1	Tilt Train	Rockhampton	
1	Tilt Train	Roma Street	

== Transport links ==
Kinetic Sunshine Coast bus routes 631 and 632 from Noosa Junction to Nambour station and Cooran serve Cooroy station, but services are not timed to connect with train services.

== History ==
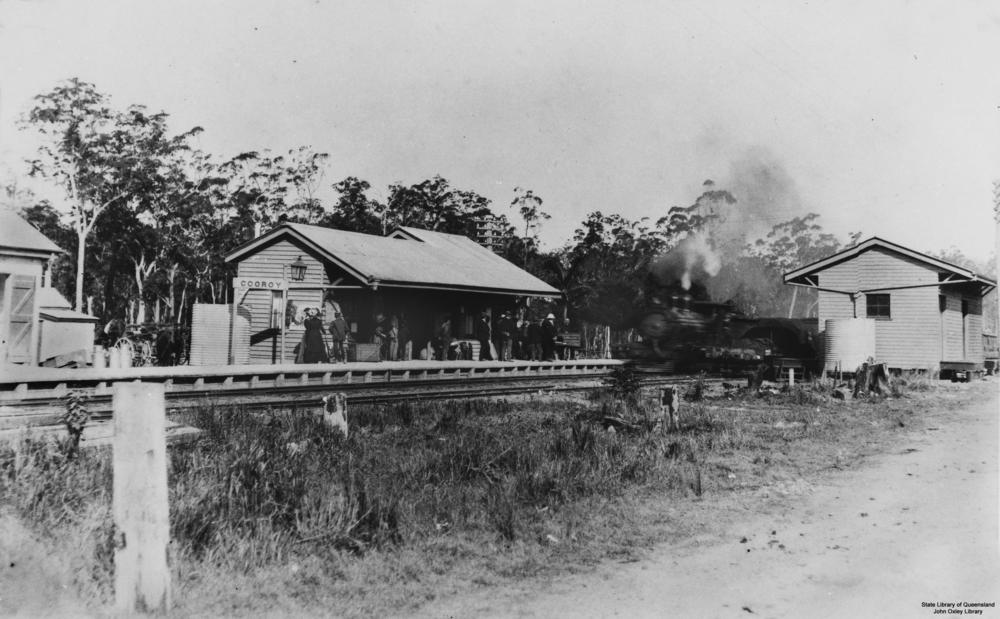
Cooroy railway station in 1911

Cooroy station was designed by the Office of the Chief Engineer of Queensland Rail and built in 1890 by Fitzwilliam Williams. It opened on 17 July 1891 with the opening of the line from Cooran. It was added to the Queensland Heritage Register on 14 August 2008.

The 1891–1916 timber railway station building at Cooroy is one of only nine nineteenth century timber country station buildings that remain on the North Coast Line, which extends from Brisbane to Cairns. Only two of these stations also have an extant goods shed and crane. The Cooroy station building, located between Maple Street and Elm Street in Cooroy, is clad in hardwood weatherboards, and has a gabled roof that extends to form an awning over the platform, supported by curved timber brackets. This particular style of station building was built in Queensland from around 1884 to 1906.

Cooroy was a logging centre well before it was a town. Development of the Noosa area was underway by the mid-1860s with timber getters active along the Noosa River and Kin Kin Creek, and the now heritage-listed Mill Point sawmill was established c. 1870 at Lake Cootharaba to supply the Gympie goldfield with timber. As timber supplies close to the coast were depleted, the timber-getters moved inland. The land around Cooroy was part of a 5,000-acre (2,000 ha) timber concession held by the sawmilling company Dath Henderson and Bartholomew from the mid-1880s until 1907, at which point the government repurchased the land and opened it for selection.

After 1891 timber was sent from the Cooroy railway station to Dath Henderson and Bartholomew's sawmill at Bulimba. A railway line had been opened from Maryborough to the Gympie goldfields in 1881, and this was extended south to Cooran in June 1889, and then to Cooroy in April 1891. Meanwhile, a line northwards from Brisbane reached Caboolture in June 1888 and Cooroy in July 1891. As a result, Brisbane was linked to Gympie and Bundaberg, and timber milled near Cooroy could easily reach the Brisbane market. Construction of the North Coast line continued until 1924, at which point Brisbane was finally linked to Cairns.

Although the Cooroy railway station was established in 1891, the town was not surveyed until 1907, and town allotments in Cooroy were sold in April 1908. Prior to 1908 the only buildings near the current business centre on Maple Street were James Duke's portable office (1891–1897), the railway station and station master's house, and JL Boden's sapling and bark store on the railway reserve (1906–1908). However, by 1910 there were three banks and two hotels, plus several cottages and stores. A butter factory was opened in Cooroy by the Wide Bay Co-operative Dairy Association in 1915, and by 1920 Cooroy had a population of 450, with an economy based on dairying, timber and bananas.

The Cooroy railway station was also a busy tourist stop from 1891, as the North Coast line stimulated tourism to the bathing spots and mountain resorts of the North Coast (now known as the Sunshine Coast).

Given the lack of a decent road north of Brisbane prior to the construction of the Bruce Highway in the 1930s, people generally took the train to Landsborough to access Maleny or Caloundra; to Palmwoods to get to Montville, Buderim, Mooloolaba, Alexandra Headland and Maroochydore; to Nambour for Mapleton, Maroochydore or Coolum; and to Cooroy for Tewantin and Noosa Heads. At Cooroy, passengers could transfer to either horse-drawn coaches or motor cars to travel by road to Tewantin, where they could then catch a motor boat to Noosa. In early 1893 Myles and Co's Coach from Cooroy to Tewantin met the train from Gympie once a day.

In 1890 plans were prepared for 3rd Class shelter sheds to be constructed at North Arm, Eumundi and Cooroy. These were simple, rectangular gabled structures, each 24 by 10 feet (7.3 by 3.0 m), consisting of an office and waiting shed. In April 1891 Fitzwilliam Williams was contracted to build two goods sheds and three sheds at stations including Cooroy for £664. The surviving station buildings at Palmwoods and Woombye were also originally 24-by-10-foot (7.3 by 3.0 m) structures.

The 1890 building, consisting of an office and shelter shed each 12 feet (3.7 m) in length, was extended by a further 12 feet (3.7 m) in 1895 to include a goods shed at the north end. By 1897 Cooroy railway station consisted of a station building, siding, telegraph, 10cwt scales, loading bank, and a timber-loading stage. In 1899 a 12-foot-long (3.7 m) ladies room was added to the north end of the station building, taking the total length of the building to 48 feet (15 m). The fact that the Cooroy station building had been extended twice before the town of Cooroy was even surveyed demonstrates that there was a fair amount of traffic at the station, either for timber or tourism. In 1908 two ventilation fanlights were installed in the office above the ticket window, which was smaller than the current window.

The station building was extended again c. 1916. By this time the 48-foot (15 m) building no longer had a goods shed section, and was instead divided into a ladies room (12 feet (3.7 m) long), waiting shed (19 feet (5.8 m) long), and an office (17 feet (5.2 m) long), the latter having already been expanded from 10 to 16 feet (3.0 to 4.9 m) wide. This configuration of ladies room-waiting shed-office was a common feature of Queensland Railway's standard designs, although the size of each section could be increased, and smaller versions might dispense with one or more of the components. A photograph taken in 1911 shows the goods shed and the station building in its 48-foot (15 m) configuration, with the widened office. It also shows an unknown building, no longer extant, just to the north of the station building.

The 1916 plan called for the office to be extended 6 feet (1.8 m) to the south, and for the addition of a signal cabin 20 feet (6.1 m) long by 14 feet (4.3 m) wide to the south of the office, thus extending the building to its current length of 74 feet (23 m). The station building was also moved southwards to its current position opposite the goods shed. The goods shed is not present on a 1909 plan of the station, but it and its timber platform are extant on a 1910 plan, located west of the line and just south of the office. There was also a 1-ton crane at the station by 1916. By March 1918 the station's signalling and interlocking was completed, and was operating from the signal cabin.

The only extensions to the station building since 1916 have been a small skillion alcove at the north end of the east side of office, where a water tank was once located, and a ramp has been added to the eastern entrance of the waiting shed. The former ladies room has been divided into men's and women's toilets. A 1917 plan shows that the signal cabin had windows on rollers along its western side, but if these existed they have since been removed, and the signal cabin is now used for storage. The goods shed does not seem to have changed since 1911.

Other changes at Cooroy station over the years included the installation of trunkline telephone facilities in 1909, and gas lights in 1920. Post and telegraph services operated from the railway station between 1892 and 1911, and level crossing gates interlocked with signals were installed in 1912 (not extant). The platform was extended in 1913, and in 1915 a new loop siding was added for the Wide Bay Co-Operative Dairy Association Ltd's new butter factory. The current overhead timber footbridge to the north of the station was built c. 1985, to replace a 1961 footbridge.

Buildings that are no longer extant include a cream shed to the south of the office (shown on a 1909 site plan) that was moved to Gympie in 1918. In 1909 there was also a trolley shed and a maintenance office to the west of the line, south of the platform. On a 1916 plan a refreshment room was located to the east of the north end of the platform. The Tewantin Cafe was operated by Mrs Godwin for coach passengers to Tewantin, on land leased from the railways near the gates on the eastern side of the line. This cafe was operating by Christmas 1912, was sold to the Railway Department in August 1915, and was burnt down under suspicious circumstances on 1 October 1915. By 1920 there was an ambulance shed at the northeast corner of the railway yards.

Other removed features include an array of sidings and a crane on the eastern side of the line for loading agricultural produce and storing wagons, and a lamp room. Cattle, pig and sheep yards on the west side of the line were removed in 1977. A 1988 plan of the railway complex at Cooroy shows an inspector's house, inspector's hut, and fettler's hut to the west of the line, south of the road bridge, and an assistant station master's house north of the bridge. Most of these buildings were sold and removed in the 1980s and 1990s.

The station today consists of one platform with a wooden building. Opposite the platform lies a passing loop.

== Description ==
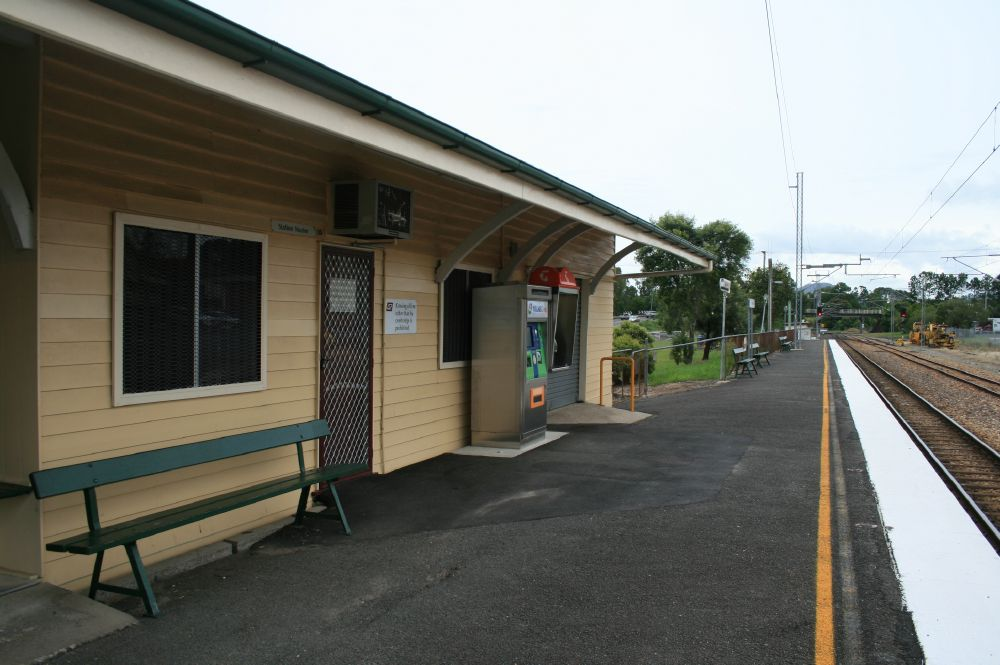
Trackside of the station

The main railway station complex is bounded by Diamond Street to the north, Elm Street to the east and south, and Myall Street and Maple Street to the west. The station building is near the northern end of the railway yards, east of the North Coast railway line. The goods shed and crane are opposite the station building, on the west side of the line.

=== Station Building ===
The station building has a gabled corrugated iron roof that varies in width and height on the east side, but which is integrated along the west side to form an awning extended over the platform. This awning is supported on curved timber brackets. A small skillion extension has been added to the north of the office, on the east side of the waiting shed. The building is 22.6 metres (74 ft) long, and is clad with weatherboards. Its components, from north to south, include: a male and female toilet section (3.6 by 3 metres (11.8 by 9.8 ft)); a waiting shed (5.8 by 3 metres (19.0 by 9.8 ft)); an office (7 by 4.9 metres (23 by 16 ft)); and a former signal cabin (6 by 4.3 metres (20 by 14 ft)). The main entrance to the station building consists of stairs and a ramp up to the east side of the waiting shed. To the west of the station building is a concrete platform covered with bitumen. This runs for some distance to the north and the south of the station building.

The men's and women's toilets have exposed studs to the interior, and have original windows on the north and east sides. The east and north walls of the waiting shed are also single skin, with the studs exposed internally. There are timber benches within the shelter shed, and a window to the east has been covered over. The office is lined internally with vertical timber boards, and has a ticket window and two fanlight windows on its north side, and a stable-style door on the west side. All office windows have been replaced. The office also has a door to the former signal cabin on the south side. The latter room is lined with fibrous cement sheeting. There is a modern metal roller door on its west side, a pair of timber doors on the east side, and a window to the south. The former signal cabin stands on a thick concrete slab, and has an external water tank on its eastern side. The rest of the station building stands on concrete stumps.

=== Goods shed and crane ===
The goods shed has a gabled corrugated iron roof, and is clad with weatherboards. Small eaves to the east and west sides are supported on straight timber brackets. A timber loading dock extends along the east and south side of the shed, and extends south to where a whip crane is mounted. The shed has two sliding doors and a window on the east elevation; a door on the south elevation; two sliding doors with their own small platforms on the west side, along with a window; and a small window on the north side. Internally the shed has exposed ceiling beams and wall studs, and an office or workshop area has been partitioned off at the south end, with the walls and ceiling lined with fibrous cement sheeting. Internally, each timber sliding door has a protective timber frame which it slides behind when opened.

== Heritage listing ==
The Cooroy railway station was listed on the Queensland Heritage Register on 14 August 2008 having satisfied the following criteria.

The place is important in demonstrating the evolution or pattern of Queensland's history.

Cooroy railway station is important in demonstrating the extension of the North Coast line during the late 1880s and early 1890s to link Gympie, Maryborough and Bundaberg with Brisbane, which facilitated the extraction of timber from the North Coast area from the late nineteenth century and the expansion of agricultural settlement (principally associated with dairying) from the early twentieth century. The extension of the station building several times between 1891 and 1916 reflected its increasingly heavy use during this period. Cooroy was also an important access point for tourists travelling to Tewantin and Noosa from 1891 to the mid-1930s.

The place is important in demonstrating the principal characteristics of a particular class of cultural places.

The relationship between the station building, its platform, and the goods shed with its timber platform and metal whip crane, is important in demonstrating the functioning of a small but busy country railway station. The layout of the Cooroy station building, which includes toilets, a waiting shelter, a ticket office, and a signal cabin, is also representative of the standard Queensland Railways designs of the late nineteenth and early twentieth centuries.

The Cooroy station building has changed little since its extension in 1916, and its associated goods shed (c. 1910) is also in near-original condition. It is one of only nine surviving nineteenth century country railway station buildings on the North Coast railway line. All of these station buildings are located between Gladstone and Brisbane and date from the 1890s. Only two of these stations retain their goods shed and crane: Yandina and Cooroy.
