= The Devil Makes Sunday =

1960 television play

The Devil Makes Sunday is a television play about a convict break out on Norfolk Island by Bruce Stewart, who had just written Shadow of a Pale Horse. It was based on the real life Norfolk Island convict mutinies.

It was filmed for British, US and Australian television.

It was also adapted for radio.

== Plot ==
In 1840, the convict settlement on Norfolk Island is run by Major Childs, who likes to punish convicts before church service on Sunday. A convict called Clay breaks out of prison and holds up the prison governor and his household in their dining room. Clay demands a boat for his escape.

== 1960 British television version ==
The play was filmed in Britain as the first episode of a new ATV series called Theatre 60.

=== Cast ===
- Alfred Burke as Clay
- Clifford Earl as Corporal
- André Morell as Major Childs
- Toke Townley as Stukely
- Sally Home

=== Reception ===
The London Times praised "the style of production" by director Morahan "with its powerful claustrophobic use of close up and crowded medium shot to convey something of the atmosphere of an Australian convict colony in the 1840s". The critic felt the play "was not, perhaps, always quite so good as it looked, it was interesting enough - for its documentary value if no other."

== 1961 US television version ==
The episode was filmed in the US as part of the US Steel Hour.

=== Plot ===
On the penal colony of Norfolk Island one Sunday afternoon, a convict, Prendergast, rests during working hours. He is flogged to unconsciousness.

Convict Clay along with Silverwood and Stuckeley leads an uprising. Dora Childs, daughter of the commandant, Major Childs, becomes involved.

=== Cast ===
- Dane Clark as Clay
- Martyn Green as Childs
- Brooke Hayward as Dora Childs
- Fritz Weaver as Silverwood
- Chris Wiggins as Stukely
- Frank Conroy as Dr McCombie
- William Hansen as Graves
- James Valentine as Barnaby
- Jack Dengel as Prendergast
- Tom Clancy as Quill
