= Night of the Gods =

1959 British radio play by Bruce Stewart

- Genre: drama play
- Running time: 90 mins (9:15 pm – 10:45 pm)
- Country of origin: United Kingdom
- Language: English
- Syndicates: BBC
- Written by: Bruce Stewart
- Original release: 31 January 1959

Night of the Gods is a 1959 British radio play by Bruce Stewart set in the context of the 1886 eruption of Mount Tarawera. The play was broadcast on the evening 31 January 1959 and the afternoon of 2 February 1959.

The play was performed on Australian radio in 1961.

== Premise ==
Case, an embittered Englishman, flees a robbery with a Maori. In the bush he changes clothes with a clergyman.

== Cast ==
- Inia Te Wiata as Jacob, a Maori
- Allan McClelland as Case
- Beryl Calder as Mary Brian
- Harold Reese as Rogers, a bank clerk
- Philip Cunningham as Colonel Polderoy
- Anthony Viccars as The Rev Mr Burbridge
- Duncan McLntyre as McRae, a publican:
- Godfrey Kenton as Mr Bridan, her father
- David March as Captain Standish:
- Sheila Manahan as Caroline Standish, his wife
- Arthur Lawrence as Mr Parker
- Ronald Baddiley as Moroney, a constable
