= Blood on the Coral Sea =

- Genre: drama play
- Running time: 60 minutes
- Country of origin: United Kingdom
- Language: English
- Syndicates: BBC
- Starring: Arthur Young
- Written by: Bruce Stewart
- Directed by: Frederick Bradmum
- Original release: January 24, 1959

Blood on the Coral Sea is a 1959 British radio play by Bruce Stewart.

Practical Wireless called it "fairly dramatic".

The play was produced again in 1966.

The play aired in New Zealand in 1959.

== Premise ==
A merchant captain, wanted for slave trafficking, unsuccessfully tryies to implicate Mr. Grayson when his ship goes down with the loss of eight lives.
