= Pomona railway station =

Railway station in Queensland, Australia

Pomona
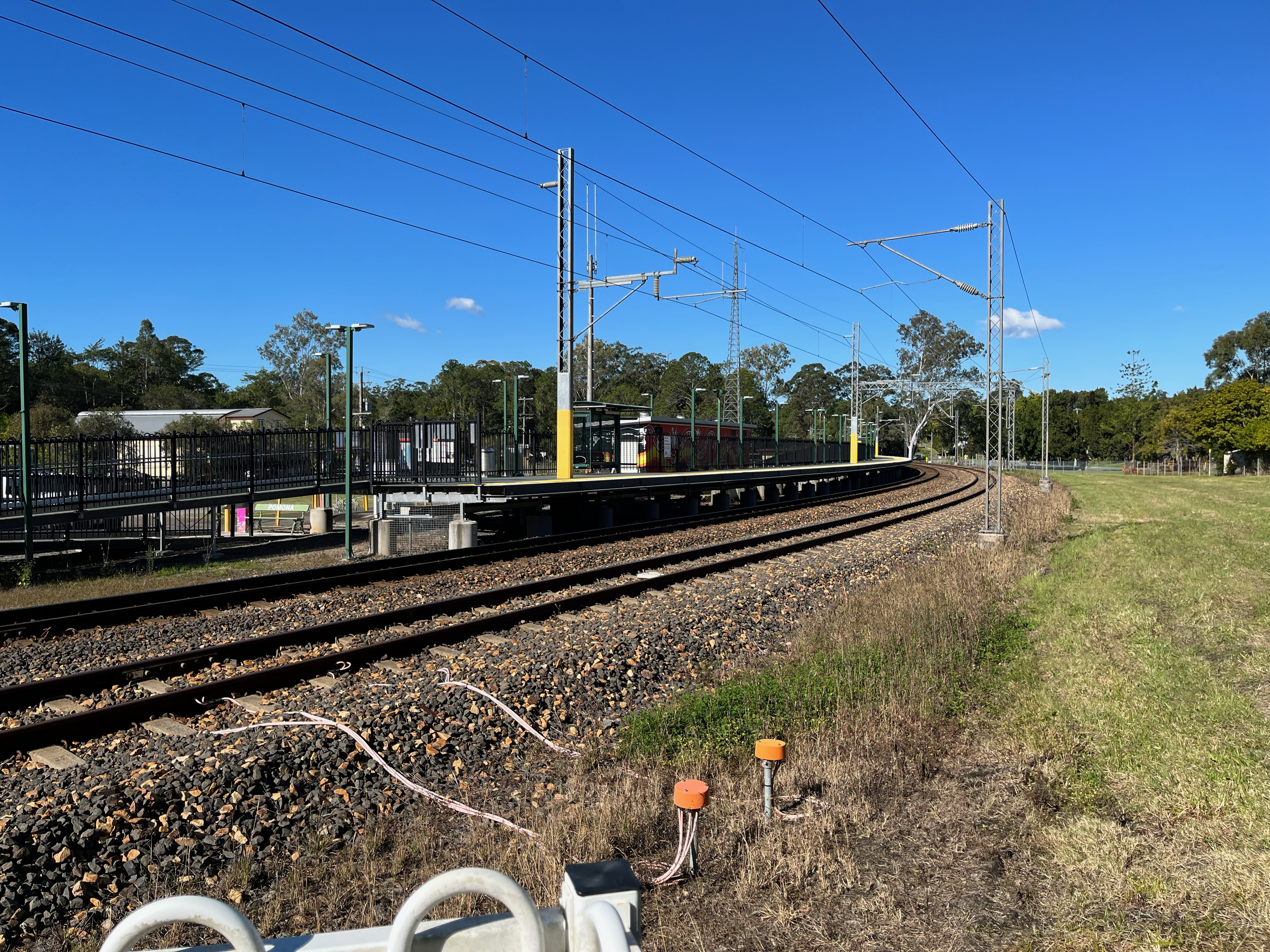
- Southbound view of Platform 1 in July 2023

General information
- Location: Station Street, Pomona
- Coordinates: 26°21′58″S 152°51′24″E
- Owner: Queensland Rail
- Operator: Queensland Rail
- Line: T1 Nambour/Gympie North
- Distance: 139.99 kilometres from Central
- Platforms: 1
- Tracks: 2 (3 until 1991)

Construction
- Structure type: Ground
- Parking: 20 spaces

Other information
- Status: Unstaffed
- Station code: 600497
- Fare zone: Zone 8
- Website: Queensland Rail

History
- Opened: 1 April 1891; 135 years ago
- Rebuilt: 2017
- Electrified: 1988

Services
Preceding station	Queensland Rail	Following station
Cooroy towards Roma Street	Gympie North service	Cooran towards Gympie North
Location

Pomona is a railway station operated by Queensland Rail on the Nambour/Gympie North line. It opened in 1891 as the Pinbarren Siding and serves the Noosa town of Pomona. It is a ground level station, featuring one side platform.

== History ==
It was designed by the Office of the Chief Engineer of Queensland Rail and built and opened in 1891, with completion of the line from Cooran to Cooroy, by Fitzwilliam Williams.

In 1895 the Widgee Divisional Board received a petition from local ratepayers pointing out that a railway siding was being built near their selections and urging construction of a road to connect Yandina Road with the new railway siding.

The location was renamed to Pinbarren railway station in 1897 and then to its current name Pomona railway station in 1900.

A tender for a small shelter shed for ‘Pinbarren’, was awarded in April, 1897, to J Williams for £86 10s. The construction of the goods shed and station were tendered separately. The original site for ‘Cooroora’ station was situated approximately ten chains (200m) metres north of the present station, approximately where the level crossing is located.

The first station was a small wooden structure of about 12’x10’ and was under the supervision of Mrs. J. Kelleher who had to look after the general business of the Department, as well as the Postal duties which were attached to the station.

The local community had originally suggested the name ‘Cooroora’ after the nearby mountain in preference to Pinbarren. Given the similarity of ‘Cooroora’ to other railway stations already opened on the North Coast Line, (Cooran and Cooroy) the name was rejected. The local community suggested ‘Pomona’, a reference to the Roman goddess of fruit and plenty. The suggestion obviously bore fruit as the name was officially adopted by the Queensland Railways, in 1900.

As traffic increased the facilities at Pomona expanded. A cream shed, ladies waiting room and veranda were added to the station in 1907. The station building was further extended in 1911 and 1915. A Station Master was placed in charge of Pomona in 1910, and a residence built for the station officer. Electric light was installed at the station in 1944, replacing the glow of kerosene lamps.

From 1912–1963, the Yurol railway station was the next station south of Pomona, after its closure, the Cooroy railway station became the next station heading south.

In 1925, Pomona district farmers sent 14,924 cases of bananas alone to Brisbane and southern markets.

The Station Master was finally withdrawn in 1991. Subsequently the station building, station residence, etc. was acquired for the use of the local community. In 2017, 120 years after Pinbarren siding, a new station building was opened.

Following withdrawal of staff from the station buildings, Noosa Council in 2000 negotiated the removal of the historic station structures closer to the town centre, on the opposite side of the tracks. Today the old station is an art gallery and tourist information centre. The former station master's house is a community activities centre.

Following removal of the railway buildings, a 'bus shelter' was placed on the single short platform. In 2009, the platform was extended with scaffolding and plywood materials. It was intended as an interim arrangement until a permanent extension was built. The temporary platform was washed away, and had to be rebuilt, following flooding in 2012. Work on a new, permanent, full-length platform commenced in November 2018.

A new station opened in March 2020 as part of a $7 million dollar upgrade and includes a distinctive Indigenous motif artwork. The new platform is higher, level with the floor of trains, and includes full access for people with a disability. Opposite the platform lies a second line used as a passing loop. Pedestrian paths were built to connect the station to Factory Street and to the town centre via Station Street. This includes an Australian first level pedestrian and horse crossing.

== Royal Visit ==
In 1959 Diesel Electric Locomotive 1250 drew the Royal train with Princess Alexandra on board from Gympie to Nambour. The Princess appeared only at Cooroy on the carriage platforms there were complaints from people waiting at Pomona, that they were unable to see her as the train passed through.

== Services ==
Pomona is serviced by two daily Citytrain network services in each direction. The No. 632 bus services a bus stop adjacent to the railway station carpark.

== Platforms and services ==
Pomona platform arrangement
Platform	Line	Destination	Notes
1	T1 Nambour/Gympie North	Gympie North	
1	T1 Nambour/Gympie North	Roma Street (to Ipswich/Rosewood line)	

== Transport links ==
Kinetic Sunshine Coast route 632 Noosa Junction to Cooran serves Pomona station, but none of its services are timed to connect with train services.

== Gallery ==
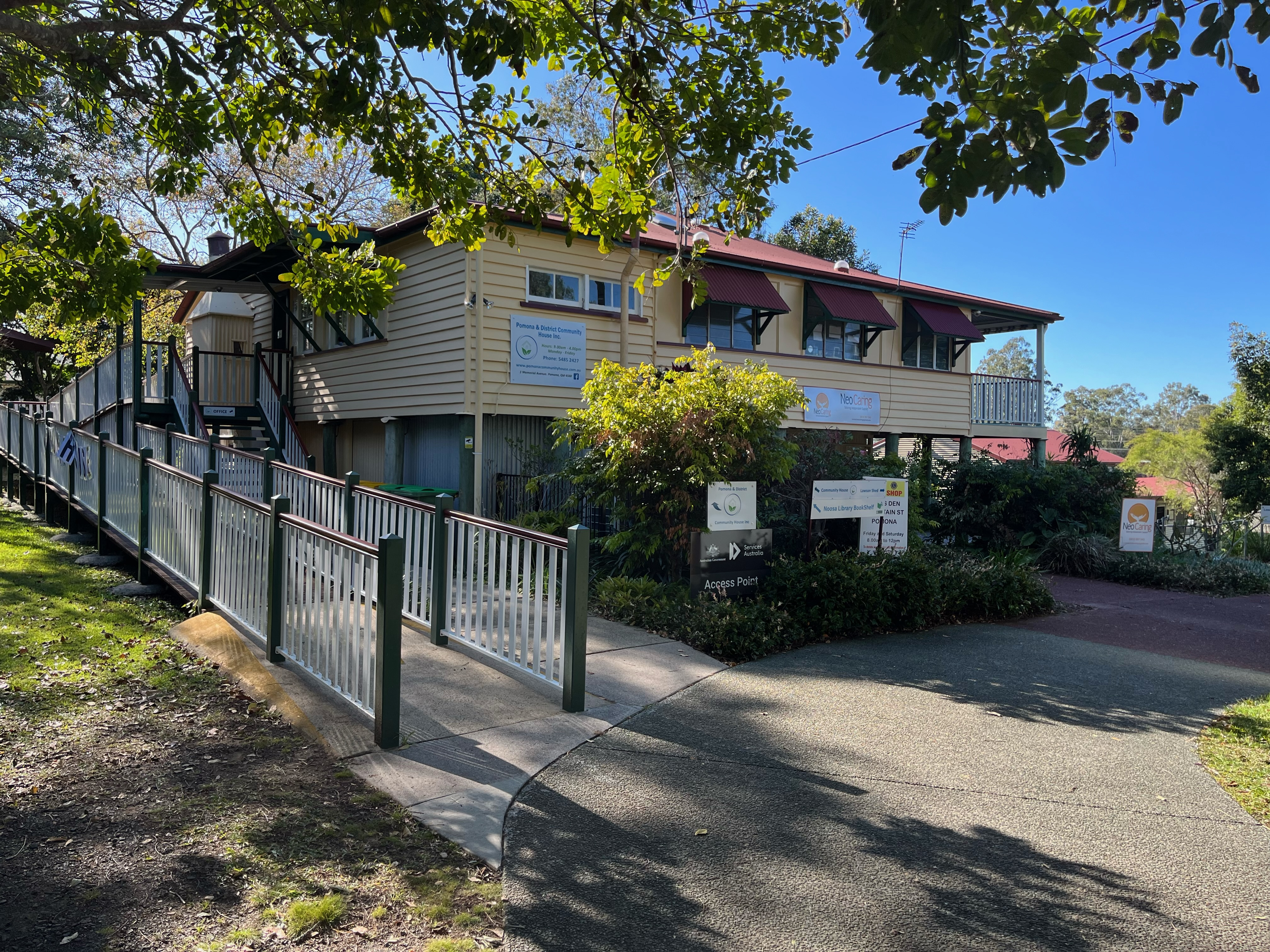
Pomona Railway Station - Former Station Masters residence

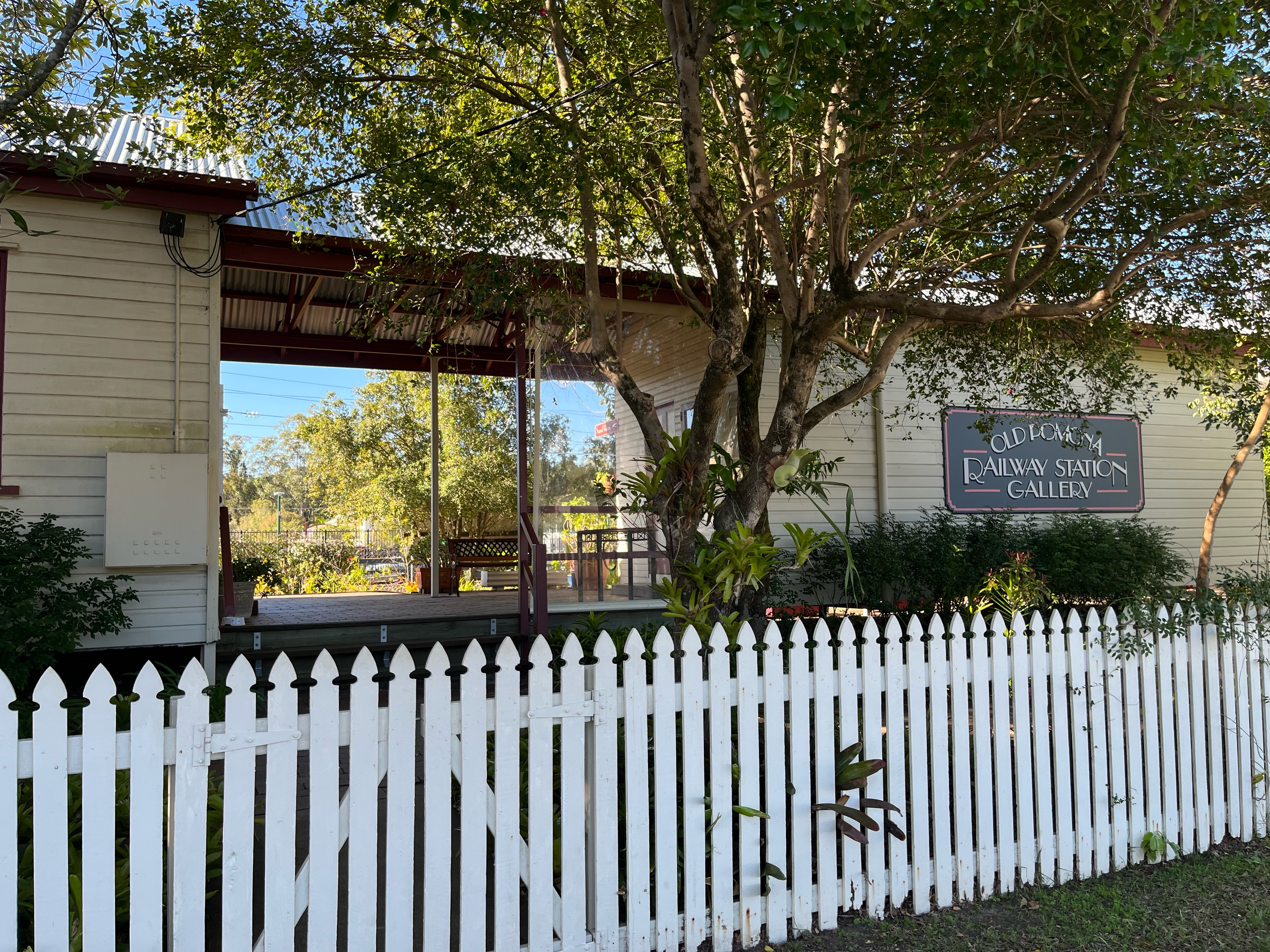
Former Pomona Railway Station

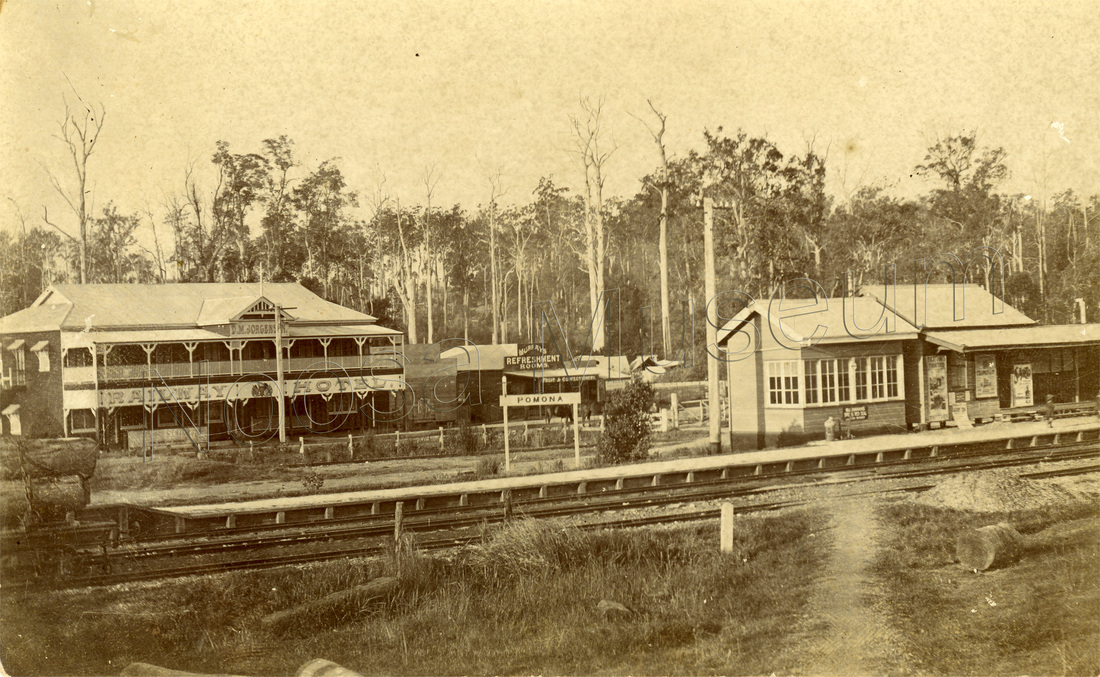
The Pomona Railway Station and Railway Hotel in the background, 1915

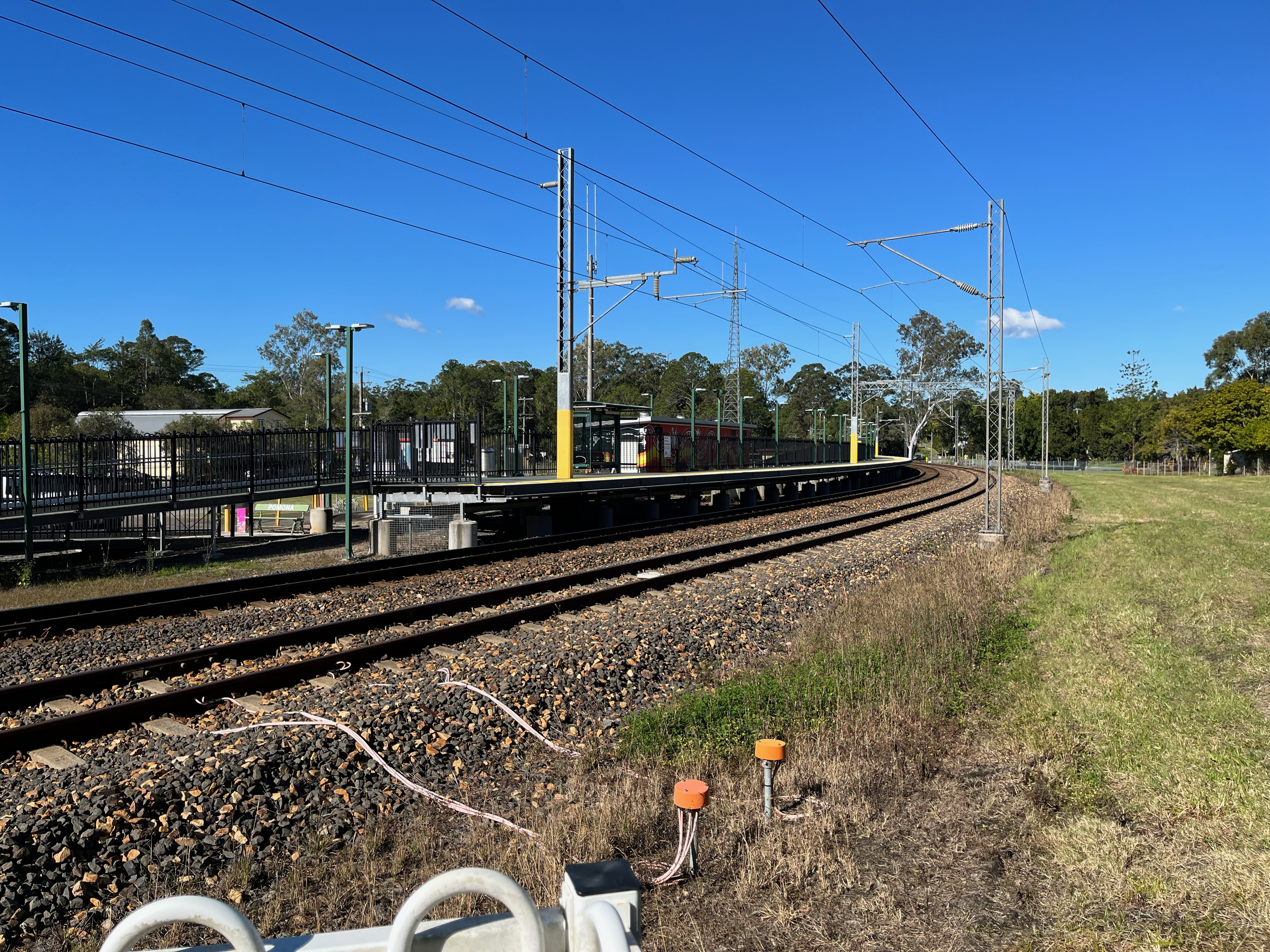
Pomona railway station - platform 1 as of July 2023

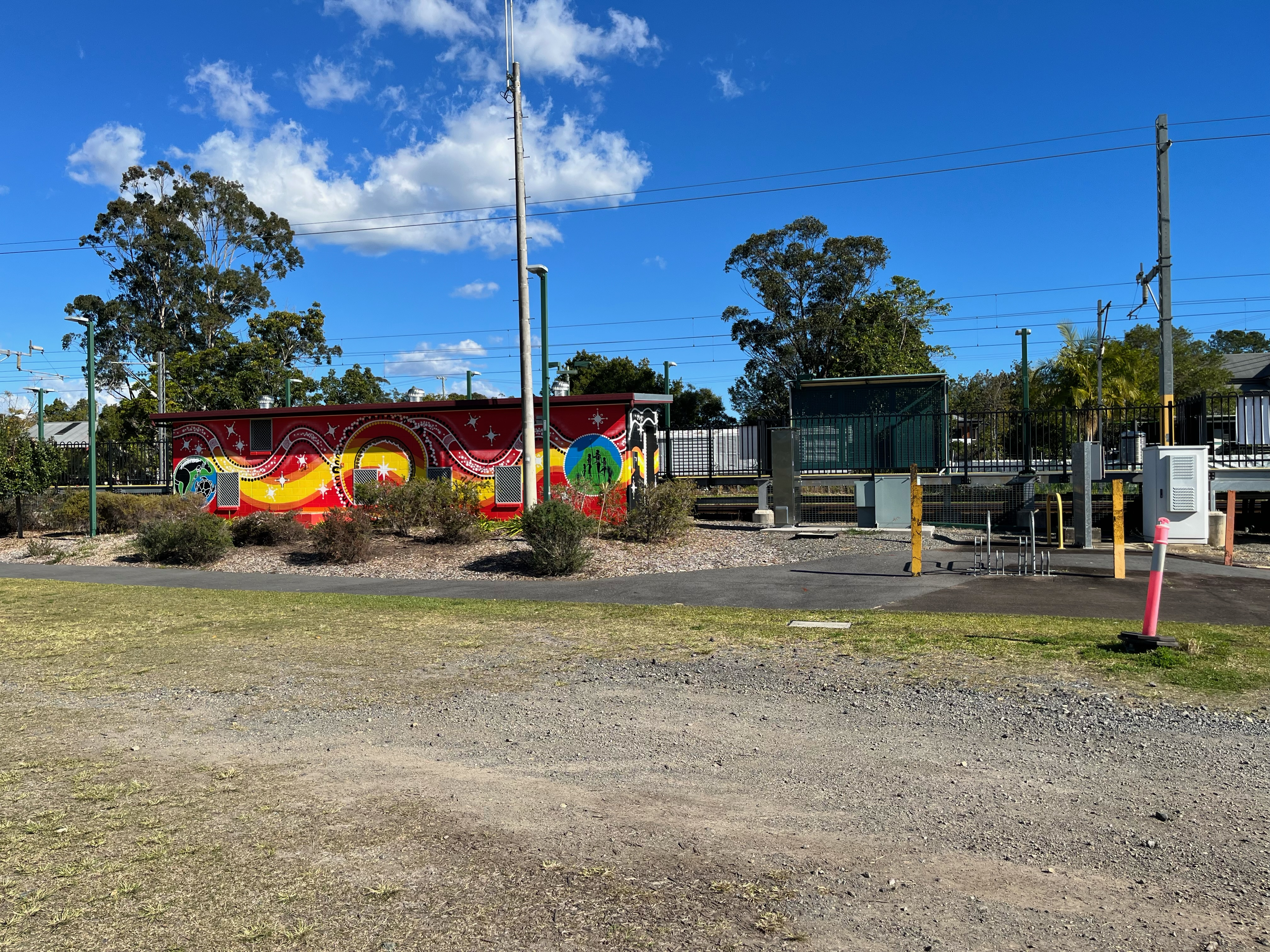
Pomona railway station platforms and entrance, July 2023
