= Day of the Galah =

1962 six part radio serial by Bruce Stewart

Day of the Galah is a 1962 six part radio serial by Bruce Stewart. Originally recorded for BBC radio, it was one of Stewart's best known radio works. It was about the adventures of Matthew Brady, a young Irishman.

The serial was recorded for New Zealand radio in 1963 and Australian radio in 1964. The serial was also broadcast on USA radio in the 1960s.

== Episodes ==
1. Birds of a Feather (30 July 1962)
2. Bird of Passage (6 August 1962)
3. The Feathers Fly (13 August 1962)
4. The Birdwatchers(20 August 1962)
5. The Flocks Gather (27 August 1962)
6. Nesting Time (3 September 1962)

== Cast ==
- Denys Hawthorne as Matthew Brady
- Sheila Grant as Sally Granger
- David March
- Austin Trevor
- Bruce Stewart as Curly Griffith
