= The Hot and Copper Sky =

1962 British radio play by Bruce Stewart

The Hot and Copper Sky is a 1962 British radio play by Bruce Stewart about the bushranger Ben Hall, originally written for BBC radio.

Stewart adapted it into a TV play The Night of Ben Hall which the BBC optioned for two years but did not use.

Stewart used the same title for an unrelated 1982 novel.

The play was recorded for Australian radio in 1963.

== Premise ==
Ben Hall and two fellow-bushrangers, Dunn and Jack Gilbert, arrive at the small township of Canowindra. As there are no police or, the outlaws proceed to take over the town, until a "town leader" Mr Grace makes plans to take action.

== Cast of 1962 BBC Production ==
- Kenneth J. Warren as Ben Hall
- Russell Napier as Grace
