= Day of the Drongo =

Day of the Drongo was a 1964 British television play based on a script by Bruce Stewart and directed by Eric Tayler.

One review called it "tiresome, naive, straining after comedy."

== Premise ==
It tells the story of Bluey, the show-struck barman of a lonely sheep station in the town of Munjurra. Two showmen come to town and Blue sees a chance of fulfilling a life-long ambition. He risks his life savings promoting a burlesque show.

== Cast ==
- John Meillon as Bluey
- Madge Ryan as Mercy Greely
- Derek Francis as Goldie Fairchild
- Monica Maughan as Rita
- Ed Devereaux as Digger Davis
- John Tate as Larkin
- Bernard Shine as Ned
- Bruce Beeby as Jack
- Jerold Wells as Father Foley
- Gwenda Wilson as Nora Moody
- Douglas Cummings as Matt Moody
- Paddy Frost as Sue
- Frances Dunn as Jayne
- Laura Carle as Hazel
- Christina Artemis as Chorus Girl
- Roslyn De Winter as Chorus Girl
- Sandra Scriven as Chorus Girl
- Walter Sparrow as Trog
- John Morris as Johnny Driver
- Roy Patrick as Triper

== Production ==
It aired as part of the First Night anthology. It was Bruce Stewart's first play for the BBC.
