= Wide Bay (Queensland) =

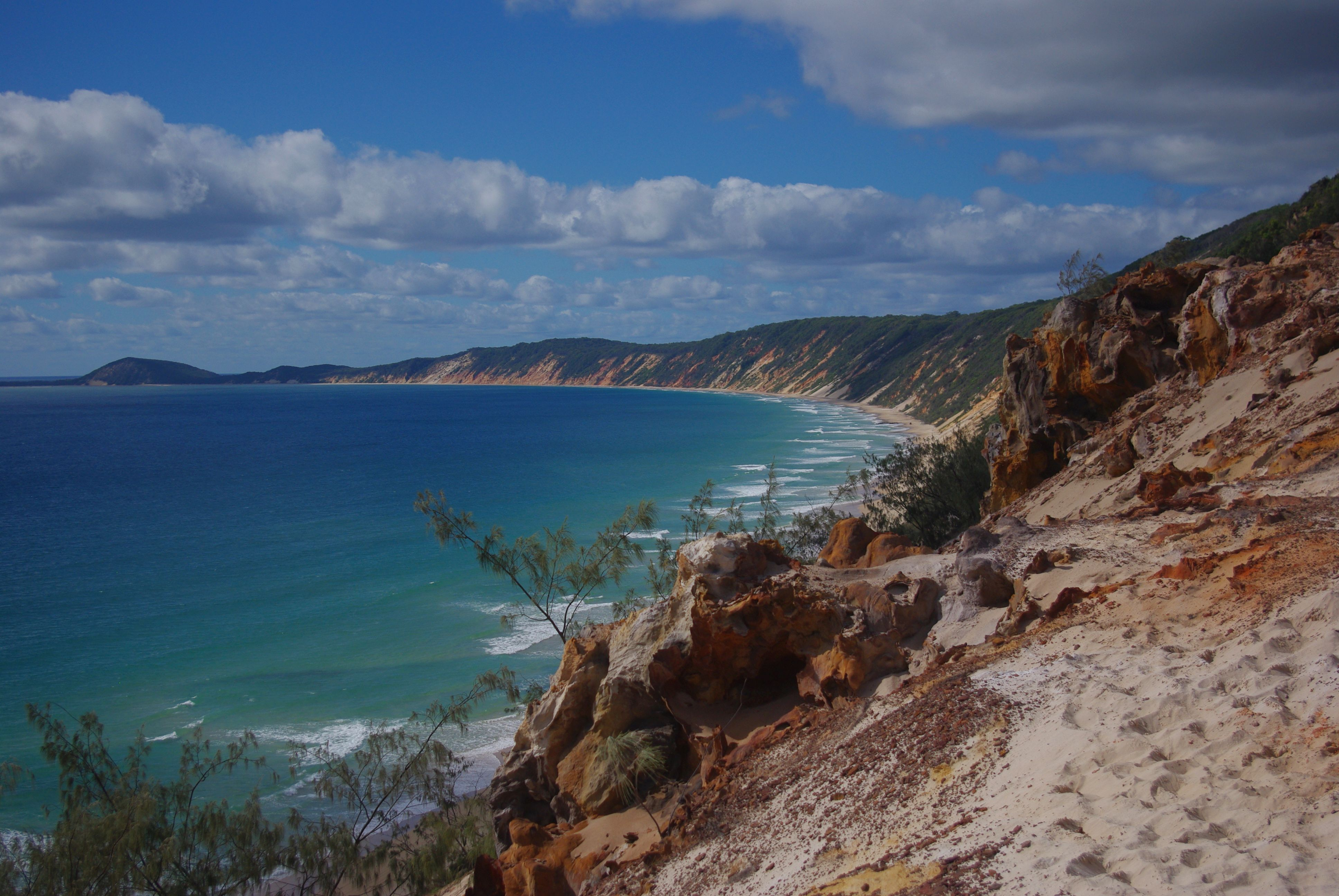
- Wide Bay at Rainbow Beach, 2016

- Location within Queensland
- Location: Queensland
- Group: Coral Sea
- Coordinates: 25.9006°S 153.1406°E
- Type: bay
- Settlements: Rainbow Beach, Cooloola

Wide Bay is a bay of the Coral Sea off the coast of the localities of Rainbow Beach and Cooloola, both in the Gympie Region, Queensland, Australia.

== History ==
Wide Bay was charted and named by Lieutenant James Cook on 18 May 1770 on his 1770 voyage along the east coast of Australia on the HM Bark Endeavour.
