= Cooran railway station =

Railway station in Queensland, Australia

Cooran
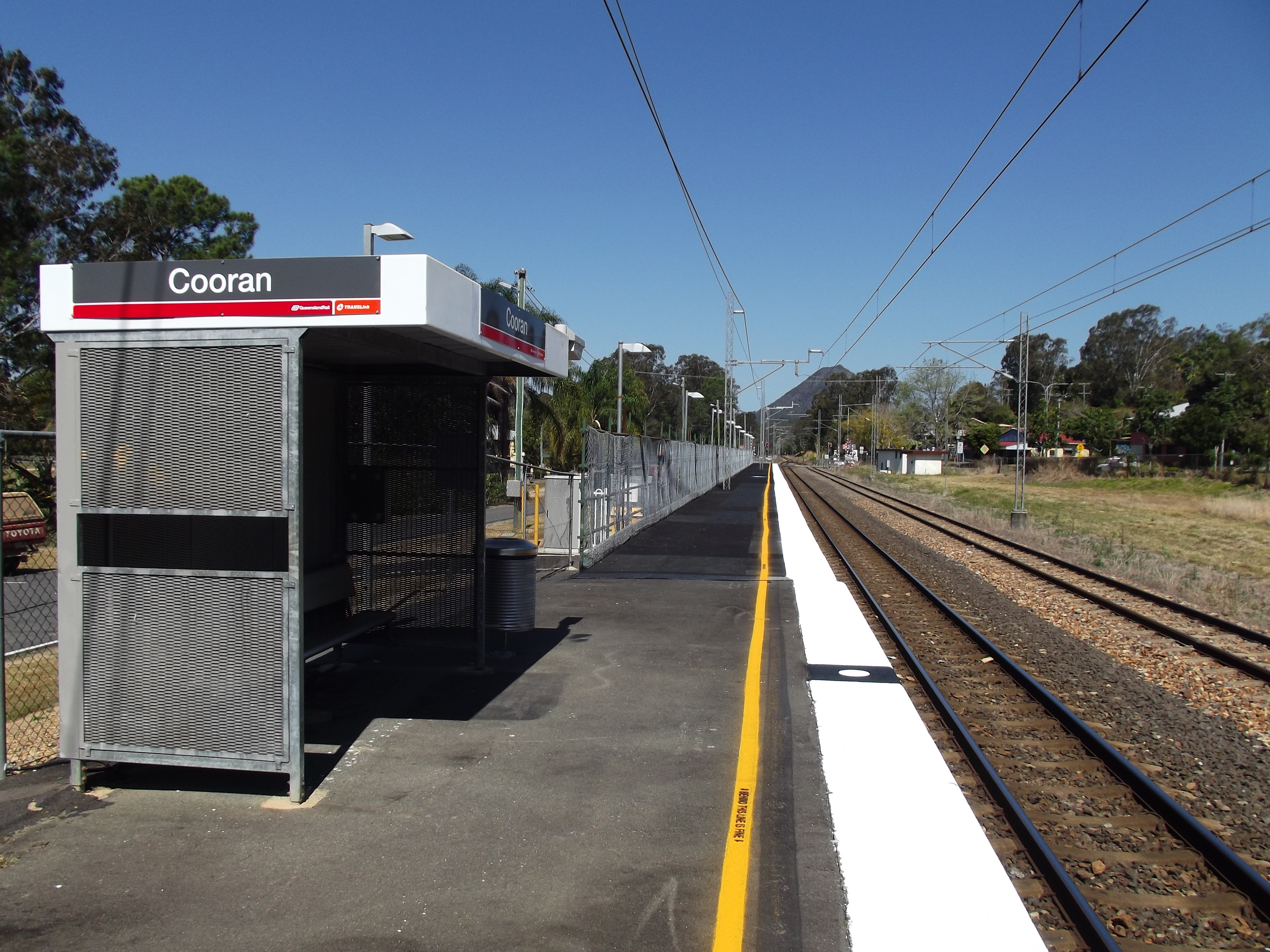
- Southbound view from the platform in September 2012

General information
- Location: King Street, Cooran
- Coordinates: 26°20′02″S 152°49′22″E
- Owner: Queensland Rail
- Operator: Queensland Rail
- Line: T1 Nambour/Gympie North
- Distance: 145.52 kilometres from Central
- Platforms: 1
- Tracks: 2

Construction
- Structure type: Ground
- Parking: 20 spaces

Other information
- Status: Unstaffed
- Station code: 600498
- Fare zone: Zone 8
- Website: Queensland Rail

History
- Opened: 10 June 1889

Services
Preceding station	Queensland Rail	Following station
Pomona towards Roma Street	T1 Nambour/Gympie North line Gympie North service	Traveston towards Gympie North
Location

Cooran is a railway station operated by Queensland Rail on the Nambour/Gympie North line. It opened in 1889 and serves the Noosa town of Cooran. It is a ground level station, featuring one side platform.

== History ==
Cooran railway station opened on 10 June 1889 with the opening of the line from Gympie. It was the terminus of the line until it was extended south to Cooroy on 1 April 1891.

The station today consists of one platform with a steel shelter. In 2009, the platform was extended at its southern end with scaffolding and plywood materials. Initially intended as an interim arrangement until a permanent extension was built, the temporary platform remained until December 2018. Opposite the platform lies a passing loop. Queensland Rail has commenced the reconstruction of the station platform and shelter, with work on the new, permanent structure that was completed by the end of December 2018.

== Services ==
Cooran is serviced by two daily Citytrain network services in each direction.

== Platforms and services ==
Cooran platform arrangement
Platform	Line	Destination	Notes
1	T1 Nambour/Gympie North	Gympie North	
1	T1 Nambour/Gympie North	Roma Street (to Ipswich/Rosewood line)	

== Transport links ==
Kinetic Sunshine Coast bus route 632 to Noosa Junction serves Cooran station, but none of its services are timed to connect with train services.
