= Bruce Stewart (scriptwriter) =

New Zealand scriptwriter (1925–2005)

- Born: Bruce Robert Stewart; 4 September 1925; Auckland, New Zealand
- Died: 29 September 2005 (aged 80); Lewes, East Sussex, England, United Kingdom
- Occupations: Scriptwriter, dramatist/playwright

Bruce Robert Stewart (4 September 1925 – 29 September 2005) was an actor and scriptwriter best known for his scripts for television. Originally from New Zealand, he lived for several years in Australia, working in the theatre, before moving to the United Kingdom in the early 1960s. There he worked on many projects for both the BBC and ITV, notably Out of the Unknown and Timeslip.

== Biography ==
Stewart was born in Auckland and studied at Mount Albert Grammar.

For three years he studied to be a priest at Marist seminary. He then moved into the entertainment industry.

Stewart served in the army. He would perform songs and tell stories as a forces entertaininer, then moved into radio in Auckland, where he worked as a radio announcer and actor.

=== Sydney ===
In 1947 Stewart moved to Sydney, Australia where he got work as a radio announcer. He became an actor, appearing in radio dramas, as well as acting in stage plays in the evening. His breakthrough performance as a radio actor was in a production of Morning Departure.

=== London ===
Stewart moved to London in 1955 and began working in television and radio as an actor. His breakthrough as a writer was Shadow of a Pale Horse.

== TV scripts ==
- A Time of the Serpent (1958)
- The Land of the Long White Cloud (1958) - serial
- Shadow of a Pale Horse (1959)
- The Watchmen of Saul (1961)
- The Cell 5 Experience (1961)
- The Devil Makes Sunday (1961)
- The Sin Shifter (1962)
- Jezebel (1963) (TV series) - story editor
- Day of the Drongo (1964)
- The Harp in the South (1964) - BBC adaptation
- Boney and the Monster (1972)
- Timeslip (1972-73)
- Old Man March is Dead (1976) - BBC play
- Secret Valley (1984) - TV series
- Professor Poopsnagle's Steam Zeppelin (1986) - TV series

== Radio plays ==
- Peter & Paula - Australian radio serial
- The Mystery of a Hansom Cab (1958) - BBC radio adaptation
- Time of the Serpent (1958) - about Eliza Fraser
- Blood on the Coral Sea
- Night of the Gods - about explosion of Mount Tarawera
- The Wake of the Long White Cloud (1958) - serial - also acted
- Moonfall (radio play) (1959)
- Low Voice in Rama (1960)
- The Hot and Copper Sky (1962)
- Flower of Blood (1991) - BBC
- Day of the Galah

== Novels ==
- A Disorderly Girl (1978)
- The Hot and Copper Sky (1981)

== Select acting credits ==
=== Television ===
- The Diary of Samuel Pepys (1958) – Will Shepley

=== Radio ===
- Walter - The Boy Wonder (1947) - New Zealand
- Dossier on Dumetrius (1949)
- Deadly Nightshade (1950)
- 26 Hours (1952)
- Night Beat
- Doctor Paul
- The Strange Life of Deacon Brodie
- Headquarters Man
- The Great Escape
- Reach For The Sky
- Mildred Pierce
- Kitty Foyle
- Saratoga Trunk
- Crisis
- The Truth About Blayds
- Romeo and Juliet (1952)
- Hop Harrigan
- GM Hour - Behold We Live (1953)
- Blind Man's Bluff (1954)

=== Stage ===
- The Comedian (1952)
- A Phoenix Too Frequent (1952)
- The Illusionists (1957)
