= Shadow of a Pale Horse =

1959 television play

"Shadow of a Pale Horse" is a television play written by Bruce Stewart which was produced for British, American and Australian television.

Bruce Stewart was a New Zealand playwright who moved to London to work as a writer and actor. Shadow of a Pale Horse won him a Silver Dagger Award of the Mystery Writers of America.

== Plot ==
Set in the 19th century in the New South Wales town of Cobar, a young man is found battered to death. A man called Jem is found next to him, drunk, and is accused of the crime. Jem is arrested but floods prevent him from being transported for trial.

Condringer, an old German prospector, suggests the town hold its own trial. Rigger, the father of the murdered youth, is given the job of defending Jem. Kirk, the dead youth's employer, is given the job of prosecuting him.

== 1959 British television version ==
The play was first presented on English television in 1959 starring Patrick McGoohan.

Bruce Stewart had arrived in England three years previously to work as an actor. The play was very well received.

The play was later broadcast on Canadian television.

== 1960 British television version ==
It was filmed again for English television in January 1960 starring Patrick Macnee.

== See also ==
- "Shadow of a Pale Horse" (The United States Steel Hour), 1960 American television play
- "Shadow of a Pale Horse" (The General Motors Hour), 1960 Australian television play
