= Hook Point =

Coordinates: 25.79167°S 153.0767°E

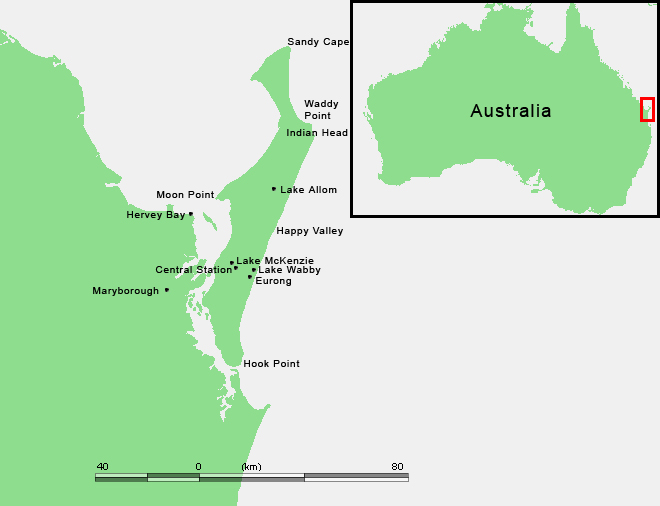
Map of Fraser Island with Hook Point

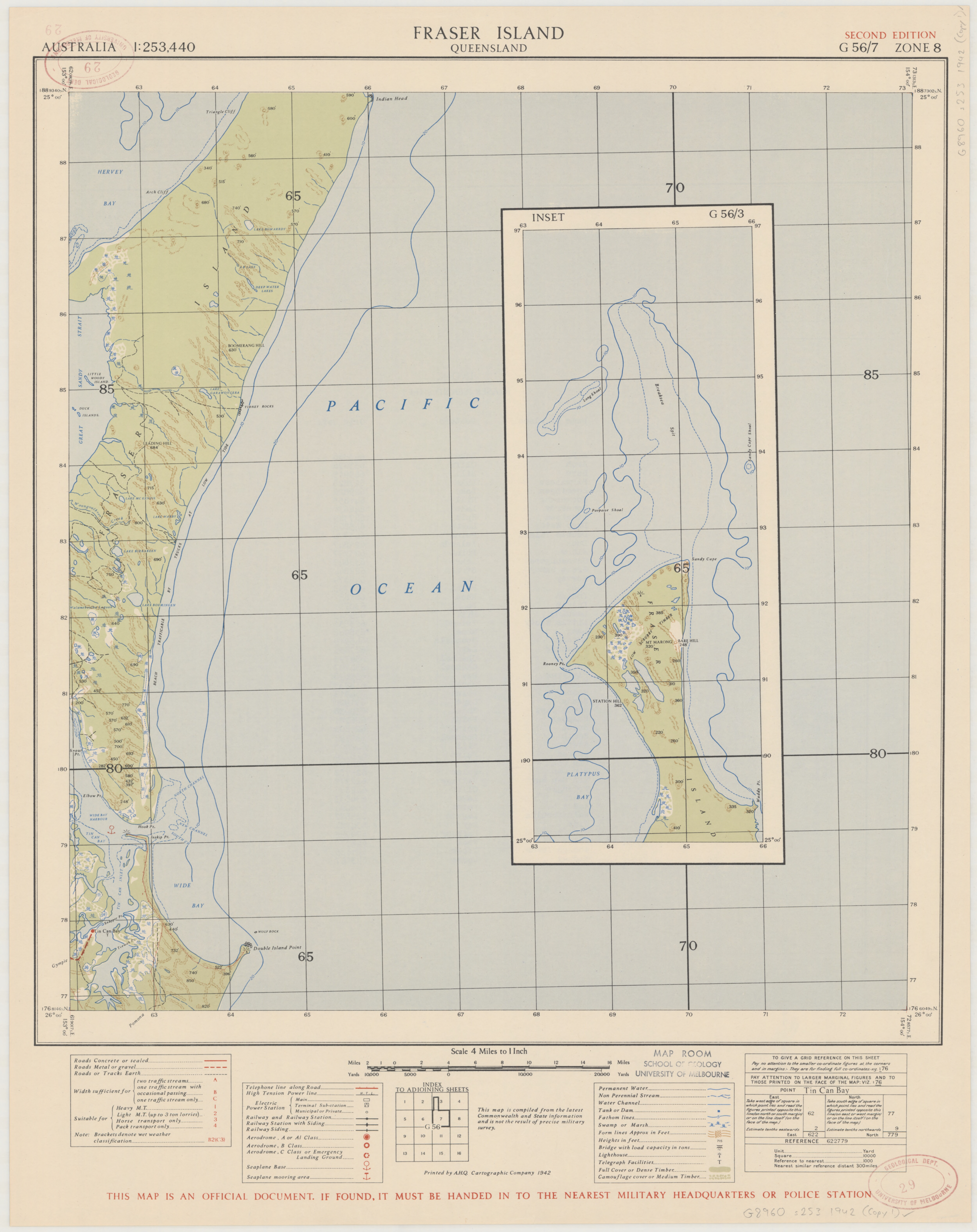
Topo map sheet of Fraser Island

Hook Point (Indigenous name: Torerr) is the southernmost tip of Fraser Island (also known as K'Gari and Gari) in Queensland, Australia. It is the landing point for ferry services from Inskip Point, which is some 1.2 km (0.75 mi) further south.
