= Rainbow Beach, Queensland =

Rainbow Beach
- Town
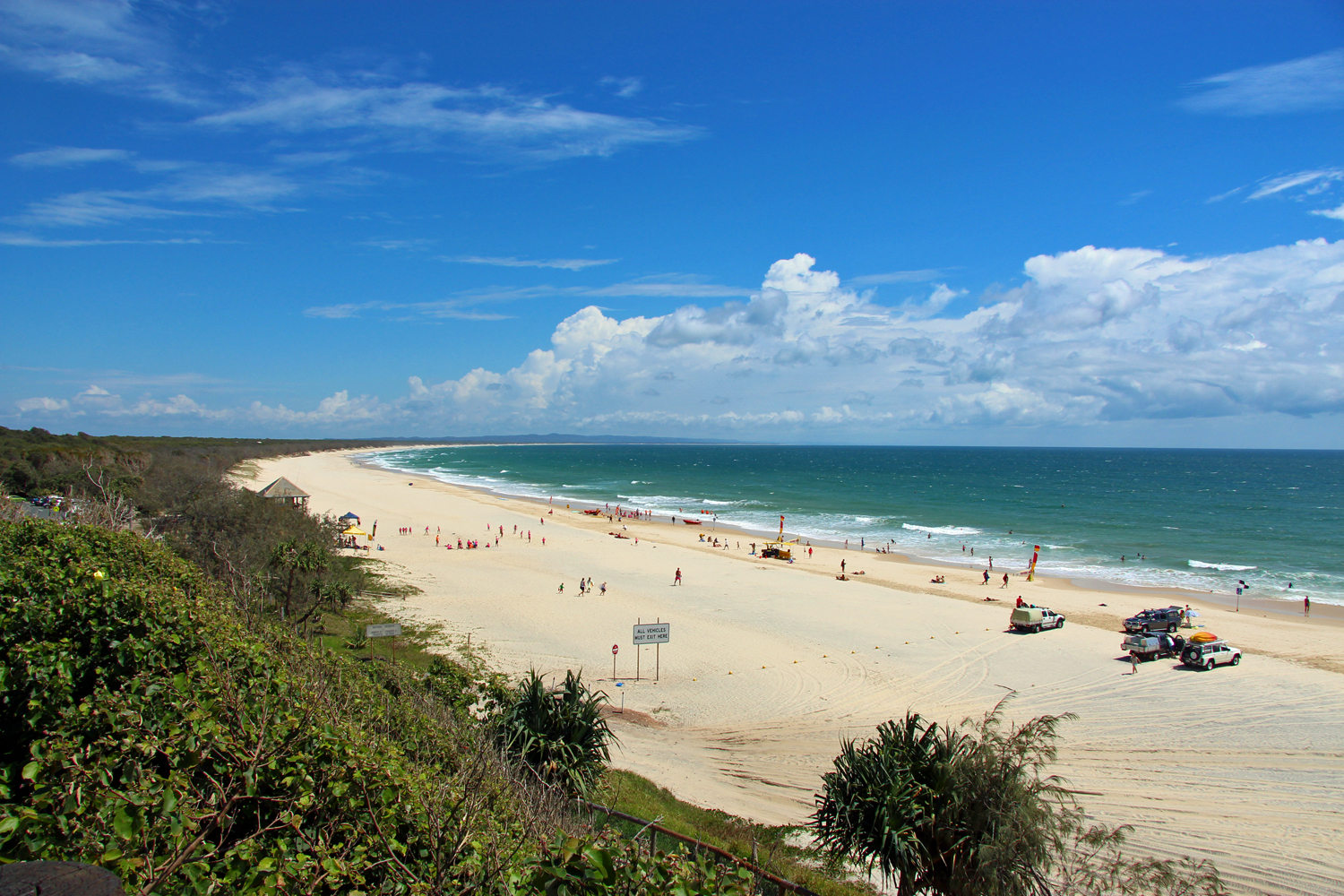
- Rainbow Beach, Queensland, 2013

- Interactive map of Rainbow Beach
- Coordinates: 25.9075°S 153.0888°E
- Country: Australia
- State: Queensland
- LGA: Gympie Region
- Location: 72.7 km (45.2 mi) NE of Gympie; 241 km (150 mi) N of Brisbane
- Established: 1969

Government
  - State electorate: Gympie
  - Federal division: Wide Bay

Area
  - Total: 14.3 km^{2} (5.5 sq mi)
- Elevation: 14 m (46 ft)

Population
  - Total: 1,220 (2021 census)
  - Density: 85.3/km^{2} (221.0/sq mi)
- Time zone: UTC+10:00 (AEST)
- Postcode: 4581
- Mean max temp: 25.5 °C (77.9 °F)
- Mean min temp: 16.7 °C (62.1 °F)
- Annual rainfall: 1,454.1 mm (57.25 in)
Localities around Rainbow Beach
| Inskip | Inskip | Coral Sea |
| Cooloola | Rainbow Beach | Coral Sea |
| Cooloola | Cooloola | Cooloola |

Rainbow Beach is a coastal rural town and locality in the Gympie Region, Queensland, Australia. In the 2021 census, the locality of Rainbow Beach had a population of 1,220 people.

It is a popular tourist destination, both in its own right and as a gateway to K'gari (formerly known as Fraser Island), with a vehicle ferry frequently running to the southern point of K'gari.

== Geography ==
Rainbow Beach is bounded to the east by Wide Bay in the Coral Sea.

The name of the town derives from the rainbow-coloured sand dunes fronting the beach. According to the legends of the indigenous Kabi Kabi people, the dunes were coloured when Yiningie, a spirit represented by a rainbow, plunged into the cliffs after doing battle with an evil tribesman. The sand colours derive from the rich mineral content, including rutile, ilmenite, zircon, and monazite. A black dune of ilmenite sands, overgrown by dune vegetation, can be found north-west of the main town. It is currently being mined for sale to China, with complete removal expected to take two years.

The Cooloola Section of the Great Sandy National Park borders the town to the south. A number of walking tracks through the national park depart from the southern outskirts of Rainbow Beach. That includes the northern end-point of the Cooloola Great Walk.

By road, Rainbow Beach is 75 kilometres (47 mi) from the Bruce Highway town of Gympie, and 239 kilometres (149 mi) from the Queensland state capital, Brisbane.

=== Climate ===
Rainbow Beach has a warm humid subtropical climate (Köppen: Cfa) with hot, very wet summers and very mild, drier winters. The wettest recorded day was 24 August 2007 with 529.2 mm (20.83 in) of rainfall. The town experiences 84.6 clear days and 120.7 cloudy days. Extreme temperatures ranged from 37.2 °C (99.0 °F) on 12 January 2002 and 16 December 2019 to −1.0 °C (30.2 °F) on 19 July 2007.

Climate data for Rainbow Beach (25.90°S 153.09°E) (14 m (46 ft) AMSL) (1992-2025)
| Month | Jan | Feb | Mar | Apr | May | Jun | Jul | Aug | Sep | Oct | Nov | Dec | Year |
|---|---|---|---|---|---|---|---|---|---|---|---|---|---|
| Record high °C (°F) | 37.2 (99.0) | 37.0 (98.6) | 34.9 (94.8) | 32.3 (90.1) | 29.3 (84.7) | 27.1 (80.8) | 27.3 (81.1) | 30.2 (86.4) | 32.4 (90.3) | 35.2 (95.4) | 36.0 (96.8) | 37.2 (99.0) | 37.2 (99.0) |
| Mean daily maximum °C (°F) | 28.9 (84.0) | 28.8 (83.8) | 28.0 (82.4) | 26.2 (79.2) | 23.8 (74.8) | 21.7 (71.1) | 21.3 (70.3) | 22.4 (72.3) | 24.3 (75.7) | 25.6 (78.1) | 27.0 (80.6) | 28.3 (82.9) | 25.5 (77.9) |
| Mean daily minimum °C (°F) | 22.1 (71.8) | 22.2 (72.0) | 20.6 (69.1) | 17.5 (63.5) | 14.2 (57.6) | 11.6 (52.9) | 10.4 (50.7) | 11.1 (52.0) | 14.1 (57.4) | 16.8 (62.2) | 18.8 (65.8) | 20.8 (69.4) | 16.7 (62.0) |
| Record low °C (°F) | 15.2 (59.4) | 14.8 (58.6) | 12.3 (54.1) | 7.0 (44.6) | 2.0 (35.6) | 2.3 (36.1) | −1.0 (30.2) | 0.4 (32.7) | 2.0 (35.6) | 6.7 (44.1) | 9.2 (48.6) | 11.4 (52.5) | −1.0 (30.2) |
| Average precipitation mm (inches) | 164.2 (6.46) | 200.9 (7.91) | 172.1 (6.78) | 125.1 (4.93) | 161.4 (6.35) | 102.6 (4.04) | 72.4 (2.85) | 81.8 (3.22) | 54.7 (2.15) | 102.0 (4.02) | 96.7 (3.81) | 124.4 (4.90) | 1,454.1 (57.25) |
| Average precipitation days (≥ 0.2 mm) | 13.8 | 14.5 | 16.9 | 15.4 | 14.4 | 12.1 | 10.7 | 7.5 | 7.9 | 10.3 | 9.8 | 11.7 | 145 |
| Average afternoon relative humidity (%) | 69 | 70 | 68 | 67 | 65 | 63 | 60 | 60 | 64 | 64 | 66 | 67 | 65 |
| Average dew point °C (°F) | 21.2 (70.2) | 21.3 (70.3) | 20.0 (68.0) | 17.9 (64.2) | 15.2 (59.4) | 12.6 (54.7) | 11.6 (52.9) | 12.2 (54.0) | 14.8 (58.6) | 16.5 (61.7) | 18.1 (64.6) | 19.8 (67.6) | 16.8 (62.2) |
Source: Bureau of Meteorology (1992-2025)

== History ==
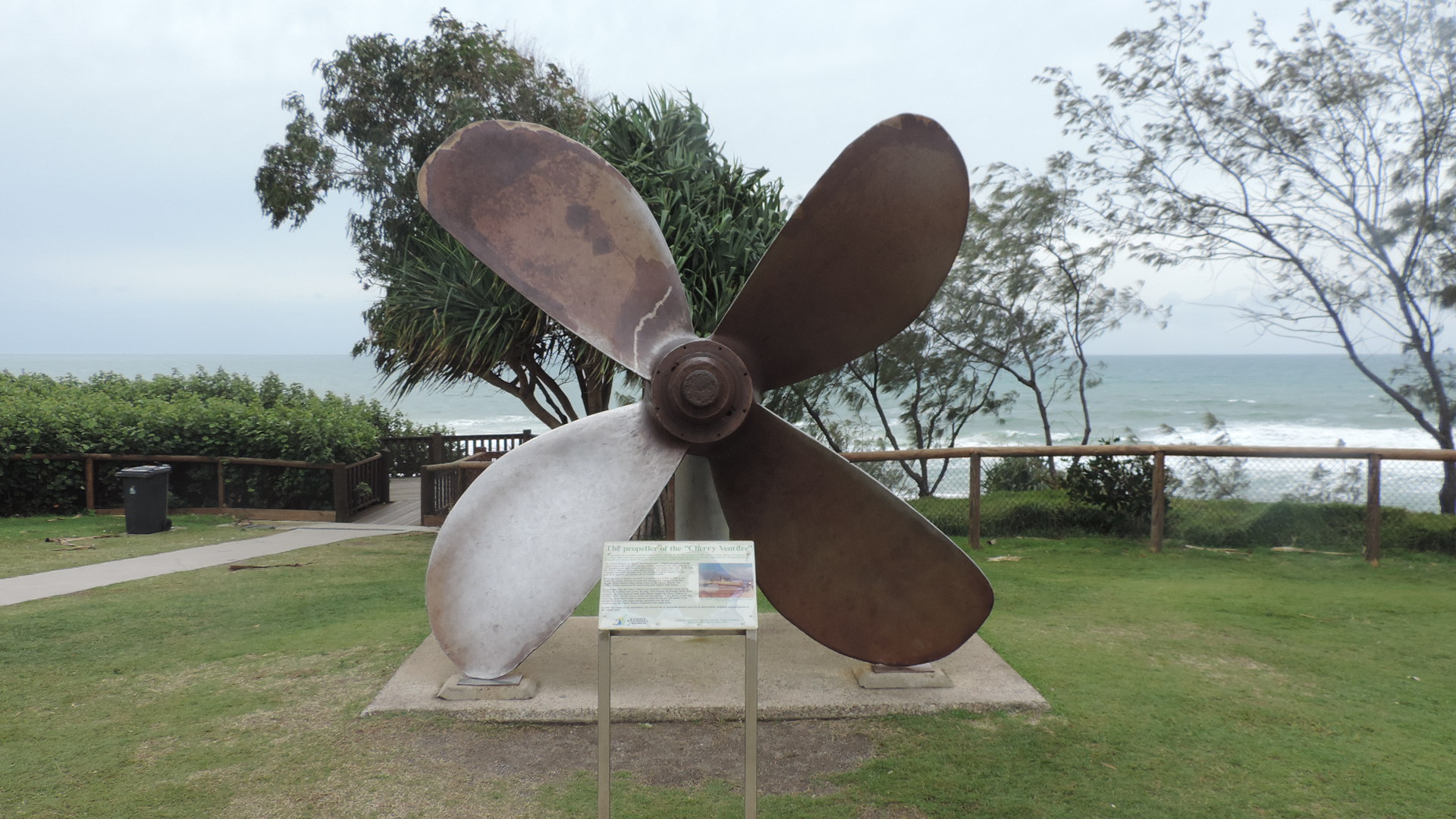
Propeller from the wrecked ship Cherry Venture, displayed at Rainbow Beach, 2016

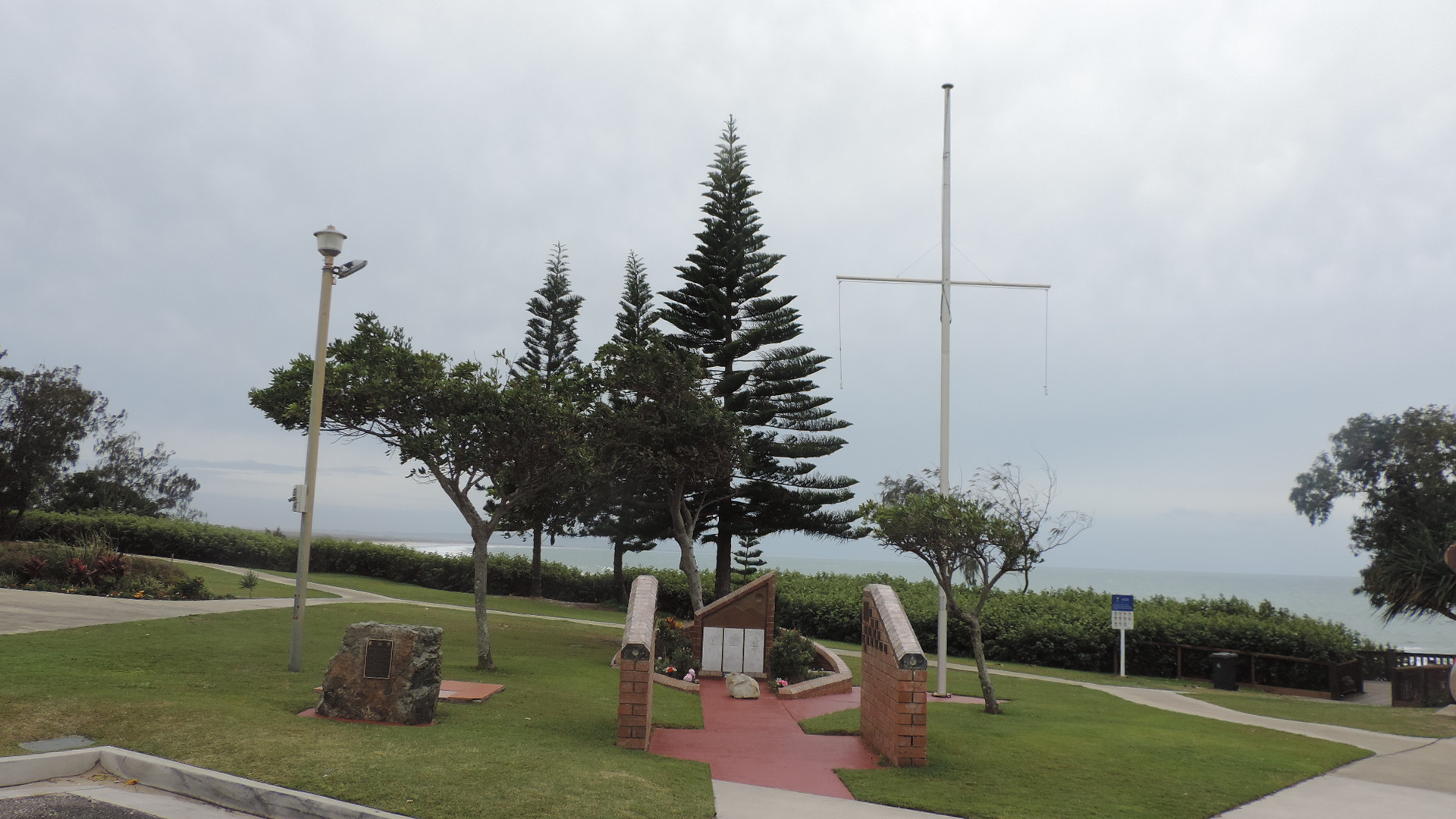
War memorial, "In memory of those who gave their lives from the Great War onwards", 2016

The town's war memorial, commemorating those who died in the World War I and subsequent conflicts, was refurbished in 1993 and is also located in Laurie Hanson Park.

Rainbow Beach State School opened on 28 January 1986.

The Anglican Church of the Good Shepherd opened on 15 September 1993. The church and hall were relocated from Yeronga in Brisbane and re-erected in Rainbow Beach after a 15-hour journey. The church had operated in Yeronga under the same name from 1958 to 1992.

Rainbow Beach Library was opened in 2012.

== Demographics ==
In the 2011 census, the locality of Rainbow Beach had a population of 1,103 people.

In the 2016 census, the locality of Rainbow Beach had a population of 1,249 people.

In the 2021 census, the locality of Rainbow Beach had a population of 1,220 people.

== Economy ==
Although it has a permanent population of about 1,000, about 70,000 visitors go to the town each year.

== Community facilities ==
Gympie Regional Council operates Rainbow Beach Library at Rainbow Beach Community Hall, 32 Rainbow Beach Road (25.9045°S 153.0902°E).

The Anglican Church of the Good Shepherd is at 17-19 Carlo Street (25.9075°S 153.0870°E).

St Peter the Fisherman Catholic Church is at the south-east end of Manooka Drive (25.9105°S 153.0887°E).

== Education ==
Rainbow Beach State School is a government coeducational primary (Prep–6) school at Warooga Road (25.9073°S 153.0787°E). In 2017, the school had an enrolment of 93 students with eight teachers (six full-time equivalent) and five non-teaching staff (four full-time equivalent).

There are no secondary schools in Rainbow Beach. The nearest government school is Tin Can Bay State School (to Year 10) in neighbouring Tin Can Bay to the west. There are no nearby schools providing education to Year 12; the nearest is Gympie State High School in Gympie approx 75 kilometres (47 mi) by road to the south-west. The alternatives are distance education and boarding school.

== Transport ==
In October 2002, Greyhound Australia coach services from Brisbane began calling at Rainbow Beach.
