= Fiona Foley =

Australian artist (born 1964)

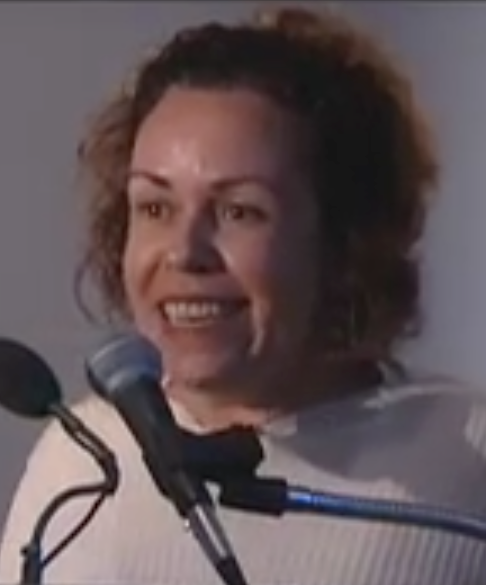
- At the Brooklyn Museum in 2007
- Born: 1964 (age 61–62); Maryborough, Queensland, Australia
- Education: Griffith University (2017, Ph.D.)
- Style: Contemporary Indigenous Australian art

Fiona Foley (born 1964) is a contemporary Indigenous Australian artist from K'gari (Fraser Island), Queensland. Foley is known for her activity as an academic, cultural and community leader and for co-founding the Boomalli Aboriginal Artists Co-operative.

Her practice encompasses many media including painting, drawing, sculpture, photography, textiles and installation, and her work addresses contemporary political issues facing Indigenous Australians. It is held in the public collections of many Australian state, national, and university collections, including the Cruthers Collection of Women's Art as well as the British Museum in London. Foley's work has toured internationally and featured in several major exhibitions, including Global Feminisms at the Brooklyn Museum, and World of Dreamings: Traditional and modern art of Australia at Russia's Hermitage Museum, the National Gallery of Australia, and Artspace.

== Biography ==
Fiona Foley was born in Maryborough in 1964 and raised in nearby Hervey Bay and (briefly) Mount Isa. Foley attended high school in Sydney with her siblings, and then attained a Certificate of Arts from East Sydney Technical College in 1983. She was one of the first Indigenous students to attend the Sydney College of the Arts, Sydney University completing a Bachelor of Visual Arts in 1986. The following year she completed a Diploma of Education at Sydney University.

Foley's mother, Shirley Foley, was born in Urangan and was a member of the Wondunna clan of the Badtjala people, the traditional owners of K'gari, sometimes formerly known as Thoorgine. In 1988, Shirley Foley established the Thoorgine Educational and Culture Centre on the island. She spent twenty years researching and recording Badjala language and culture, culminating in the publication of a Badtjala/English dictionary. Her mother's cultural pride and high regard for education have influenced Foley throughout her career. Her father was Barry Foley (1938-2017), who was born in Sydney, one of nine children in a Catholic family. His father emigrated to Australia from Ireland before World War I.

Since 1985, Foley has had significant engagement with Indigenous communities in central Australia, most notably Maningrida and Ramingining in Arnhem Land. Foley and her mother visited Maningrida in 1992, facilitating a cultural exchange between locals and Badtjala people. Before this, Foley lived and worked in Ramingining for several months. These trips greatly informed her practice, provided further insights into Aboriginal culture, and inspired her to be a cultural leader. In 1995, Foley permanently moved back to Hervey Bay to be with family and take part in Native Title negotiations regarding a portion of Fraser Island. As of 2014, this claim has been successful.

In 2017 Foley completed a Doctorate of Philosophy. Her research focused on the Aboriginals Protection and Restriction of the Sale of Opium Act 1897. A number of her artworks have referenced this act and its effect on the Badtjala people. Her thesis was subsequently published by University of Queensland Press as Biting the Clouds, which won the 2021 Queensland Premier's Award for a work of State Significance.

== Career and artistic practice ==
Community engagement is pertinent to Foley's art practice. She contributed to the emergence of urban Australian Indigenous Art through her participation in the seminal Koori '84 group exhibition at Artspace. Following this, she was involved in the foundation of several artist co-operatives and initiatives. These include the Boomalli Aboriginal Artists Co-operative and artist exchanges and collaborative workshops between Badtjala people and artists from Maningrida & Ramingining. More recently Foley’s involvement in the arts community has extended to curatorial roles. In 1994 she co-curated Tyerabarrbowaryaou II - I shall never become a white man for the Havana Biennial alongside Djon Mundine. This was the first international exhibition to be curated by Indigenous Australians.

Political issues are central to Foley’s practice. Her works in public art and installation aim to examine and redress previously disregarded histories of colonisation in Australia. One such example is Edge of the Trees, a 1995 collaboration with Janet Laurence - the first major public artwork by both an Indigenous and a non-Indigenous Australian artist. In 1995 it was awarded the Lloyd Rees Award for Urban Design. The work utilises both Western and Indigenous iconographies to evidence historical conflict - both on its site (the Museum of Sydney, formerly Australia’s first Government House) and across Australia. Pukumani or tutini (funerary) poles contrast Sydney’s urban landscape and memorialise the violence that shaped early interactions with settlers on the city’s shore.

Foley’s Land Deal (1995) and Lie of the Land (1997) serve as evidence and a reminder of John Batman’s now-invalidated treaty for 600,000 acres of Wurundjeri land (where Melbourne currently stands), and its basis on false premises. Similarly, Witnessing to Silence (2004) remembers all known massacres of Indigenous people within Queensland, listing 94 such sites. The corpses on these sites were hidden either by burning or submerging in bodies of water. Foley engaged in some chicanery to ensure the work’s installation, telling its commissioners (Brisbane Magistrate’s Court) that the work was about sites of natural phenomena - fire and flood. The work’s true meaning was only unveiled once installed.

Her work entitled Black Opium, commissioned by the State Library of Queensland in 2006, explores themes of history, memory and politics through sculptural installations and photographs, and references the Aboriginals Protection and Restriction of the Sale of Opium Act 1897 as well as the impacts of the British colonial opium trade on both Chinese and Indigenous communities. By exhibiting these works within the context of Western cultural institutions, Foley aims to evidence and embed oppressive Australian histories where they have previously been excluded.

At other times Foley’s work strikes a more playful or satirical political tone. Her appropriation of ethnographic imagery and "Aboriginalia" (kitsch objects depicting Indigenous Australians in a culturally insensitive manner) serve to critique these claims to the representation of Indigenous people. Positioning herself as both subject and author, Foley rectifies power imbalances and reconstructs an oppressive history. Works such as 1994’s Native Blood and Badtjala Woman demonstrate an aim to undermine and challenge the historical and "scientific" sanctity of such images, whilst highlighting the West’s idealisation, sexualisation and exploitation of Indigenous culture as an exotic aesthetic.

Connection to place features heavily throughout Foley’s practice. Themes of nature - sand and sea - pervade pictorial works and foreground the significance of Foley’s ancestral ties to Thoorgine (Fraser Island). The Legends of Moonie Jarl, a book written and illustrated in the 1960s by Foley’s aunt and uncle, relates numerous Badtjala creation stories that describe the animals, vegetation and weather patterns of the island. This text, her mother and her stints in Arnhem Land are considered major reference points for Foley’s 2D practice. Men's Business (1987–89), Catching Tuna (1992) and Salt Water Islands (1992) depict Foley’s experience during her time visiting the remote communities of Maningrida and Ramingining in the Northern Territory. They demonstrate the minimalism, flatness and "symbolic abstraction" that is characteristic of Foley’s pastels and paintings. Typically making use of an aerial perspective, these works privilege meditative spatiality over didactic naturalistic representations. Significantly, this counters historical ethnographic and spectatorial depictions of Indigenous culture by settlers. Contrarily, Foley’s work impresses a sense of myth, memory and dream - both personal and collective. Politically, this practice is an affirmative reclamation of symbols, narratives, cultures and histories that have previously been appropriated or erased.

In 2013 Fiona Foley was interviewed in a digital story and oral history for the State Library of Queensland's James C Sourris AM Collection. In the interview Foley talks to writer, Louise Martin-Chew about her life as an artist and the influences on her practice including her sense of justice, desire to tell the hidden histories, her family memories and her love for Aboriginal culture.

In 2020 Foley was awarded State Library of Queensland's inaugural Monica Clare Research Fellowship for her project Bogimbah Creek Mission: The First Aboriginal Experiment and The Magna Carta Tree. From her research fellowship, Foley produce her publication Bogimbah Creek Mission: the First Aboriginal Experiment and a Research Reveals lecture on the subject.

Foley is represented by Niagara Galleries, Melbourne.

== Selected works ==
- Annihilation of the Blacks, 1986
- Eliza’s rat traps, 1991
- Lost Badtjalas, Severed Hair, 1991
- Native Blood, 1994
- Badtjala Woman, 1994
- Land Deal, 1995
- Edge of the Trees (with Janet Laurence), 1995
- HHH, 2004
- Witnessing to Silence, 2004
- Nulla 4 eva, 2009
