= Edge of the Trees =

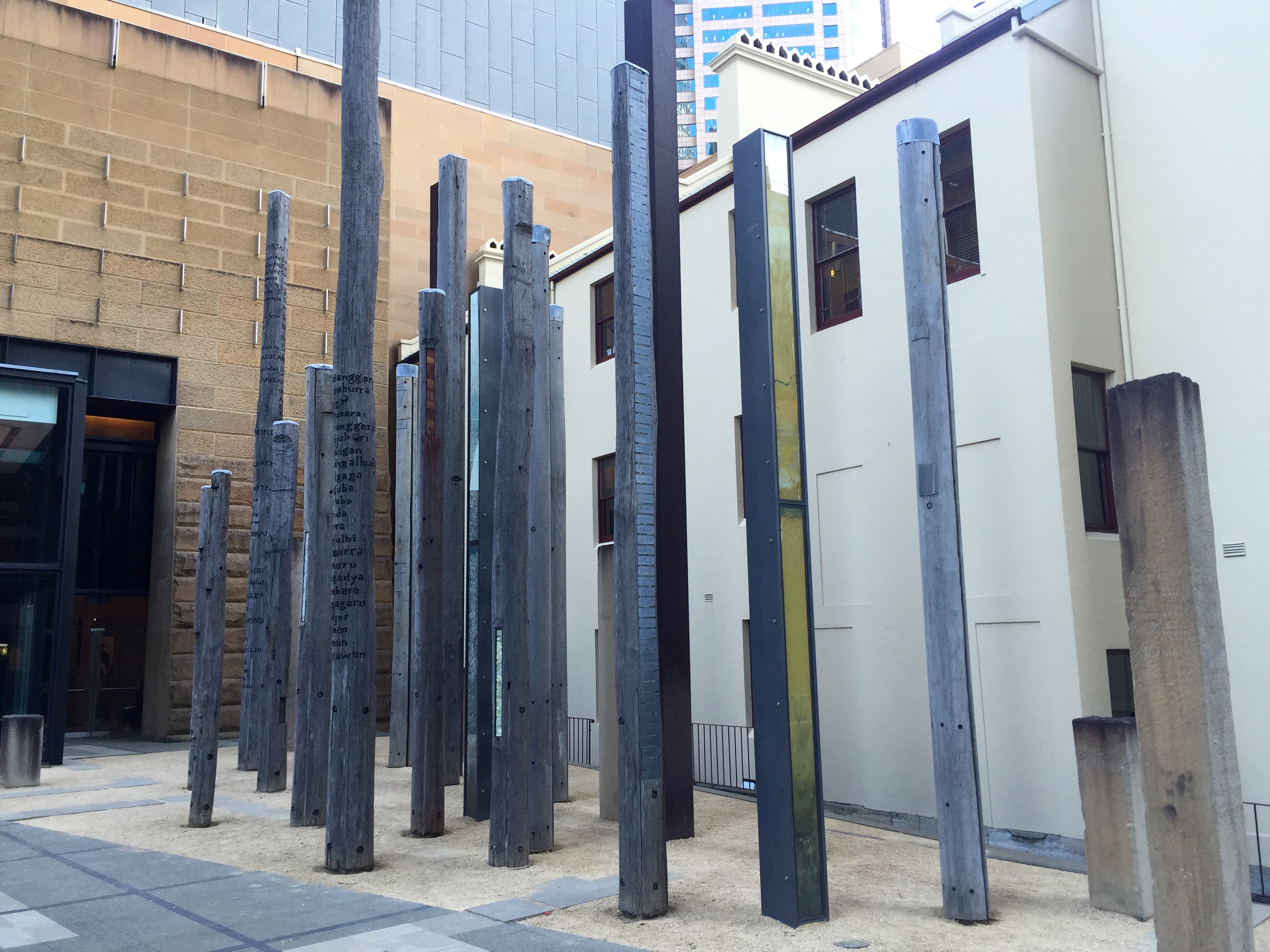
- View of artwork when entering the forecourt of Museum of Sydney
- Artist: Janet Laurence (in collaboration with Fiona Foley)
- Year: 1995
- Type: Sculpture
- Medium: Sydney sandstone, wood, steel, oxides, shells, honey, bones, zinc, glass, sound
- Location: Museum of Sydney; Sydney, Australia; 33°51′49″S 151°12′41″E
- Owner: Museum of Sydney
- Website: sydneylivingmuseums.com.au/exhibitions/edge-trees

Edge of the Trees is a collaborative installation artwork created by artists Janet Laurence and Fiona Foley. The artwork is a site-specific piece located at the forecourt of the Museum of Sydney, Sydney since its opening in 1995. The artwork is constructed with 29 vertical pillars made from various organic materials such as wood, steel, and sandstone collaborating with sound elements. This public art installation has won several awards as it evokes the cultural and physical history of the site.

== Philosophy and meaning ==
The intention of the artwork is to interpret and make reference to the past: the indigenous, the displaced, and the land. The name of the sculpture originated in an essay by historian Rhys Maengwyn Jones: "…the "discoverers" struggling through the surf were met on the beaches by other people looking at them from the edge of the trees. Thus the same landscape perceived by the newcomers as alien, hostile, or having no coherent form, was to the indigenous people their home, a familiar place, the inspiration of dreams." Edge of the Trees symbolises the interaction between Aboriginal and non-Aboriginal people at this site, which was a significant site of first contact. The artists express such idea as they delivered multiple layers of memories of the site through the language of materials, naming, and mapping and the memories include: the botanical memory, the Eora memory, and the Colonial memory.

The sculpture is a site-specific art that made direct reference to the Museum of Sydney. The concept of the museum is the Historic Houses Trust and the senior curator, Peter Emmett. Laurence was one of the artists who was invited to submit a proposal for the limited competition for the museum. The competition brief invited the artists to "engage with the architecture in dialogue, counterpoint, even tension". Laurence invited Aboriginal artist Fiona Foley to collaborate with her to directly respond to the culturally charged symbolism of the site. Foley was able to bring in the authentic cultural input and authority to incorporate materials that a non-Aboriginal artist could not have.

== Material naming and mapping ==
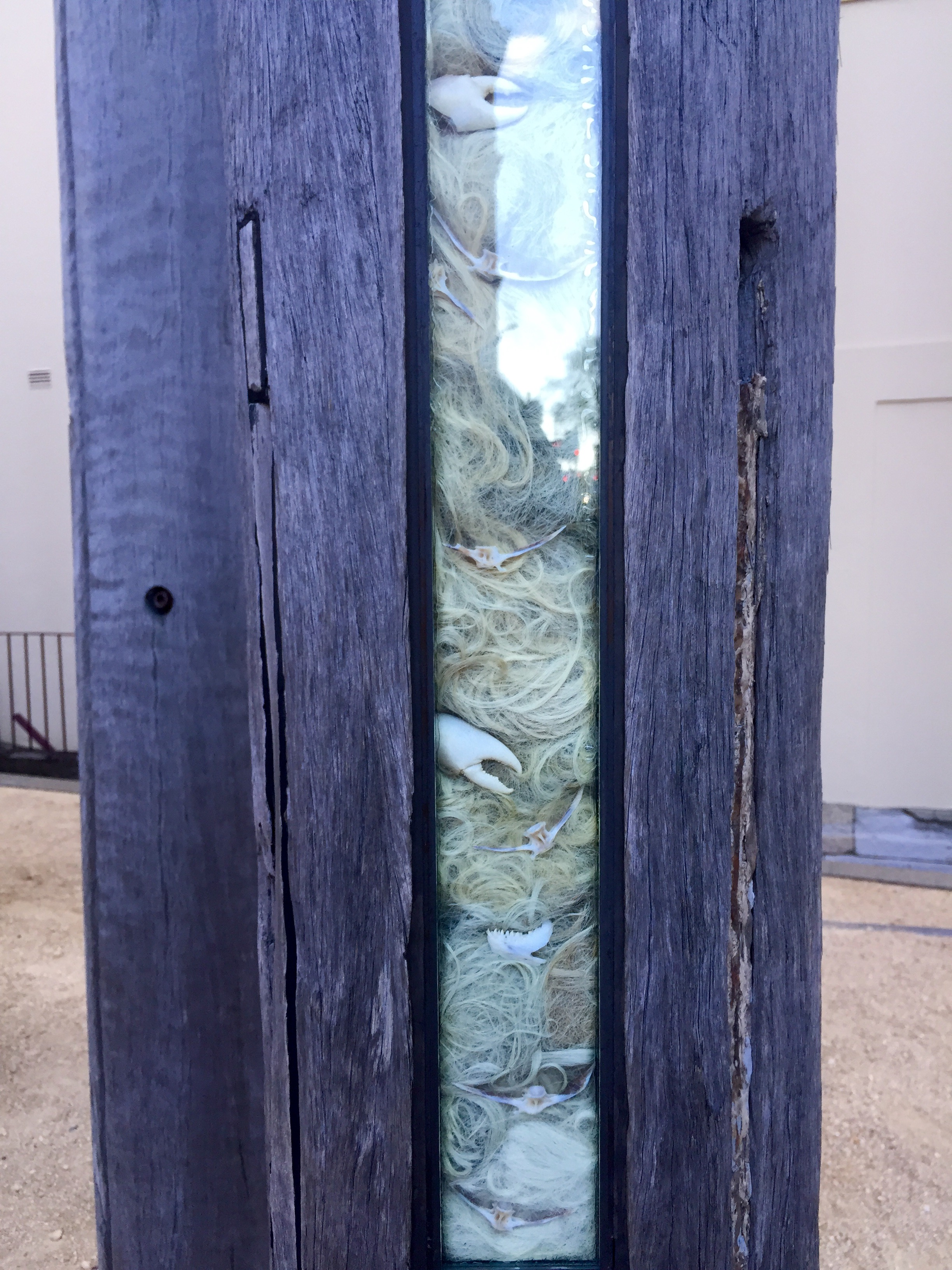
Close up of organic materials such as hair, shell, bone, and feathers embedded in windows of timber pillar

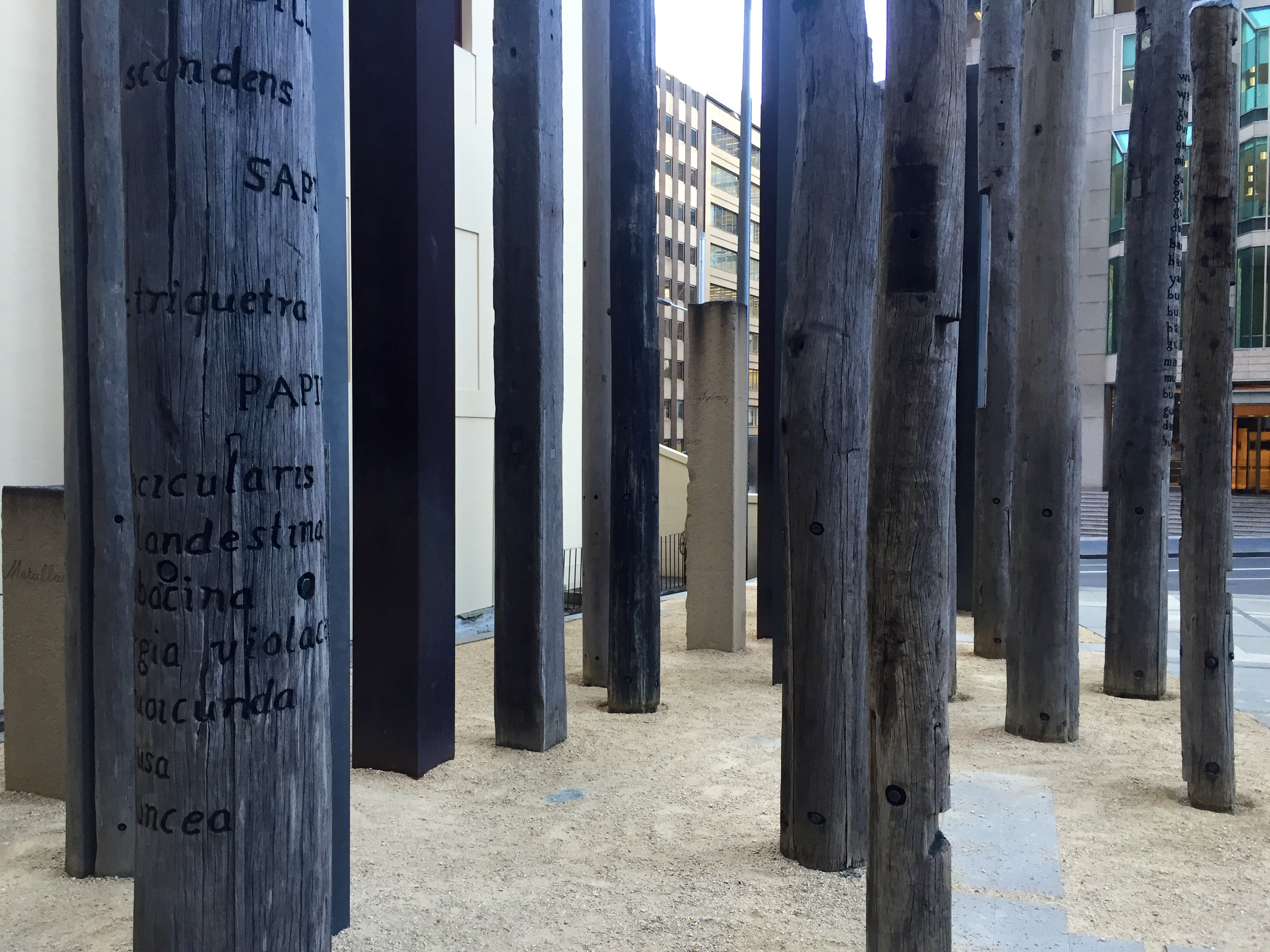
Close up view of one of the timber pillars with Latin and Aboriginal language engravings

Edge of the Trees is a "forest" of 29 massive pillars made of wood, steel and sandstone clustering at the museum forecourt near the entrance. Wooden pillars points to the grove of trees that once occupied the site. The pillars were ironbark and tallow wood trees which were collected from around Sydney. The sandstone material is to suggest Sydney's historical building material and the substance on which Sydney is built. Steel is used to link to the steel and glass features of the museum architecture, extending the building and reflecting upon the industrial developments since the colonial period.

Organic materials such as human hair, shell, bone, feathers, ash and honey, are embedded in windows within the wood pillars, symbolising and memorialising the lives that lived around the site. Natural and cultural histories are evoked by the names of botanical species carved or burnt into wooden columns in both Latin and Aboriginal languages, along with the signatures of First Fleeters.

Words are engraved onto the pillars such as the species from pollen readings of the Governor's garden and the names of the first fleeters who arrived in Sydney in 1788. Place names are also engraved on the sandstone pillars in Latin and Aboriginal languages.

The 29 vertical poles correspond to the 29 Aboriginal clans from around Sydney. As the work is designed not to be viewed from a distance but experienced up close as part of the sensual and spatial encounter, the audience are invited to touch and run their fingers along the engraved names and to feel the textures of the different materials. Walking between the pillars you hear a soundscape of Koori voices reciting the names of places in the Sydney region that have today been swallowed up by the metropolis. This is also a way to celebrate the moment in time.

== Awards ==
- 1995: Lloyd Rees Award for Outstanding Urban Design, Australian Institute of Architects.

== Gallery ==
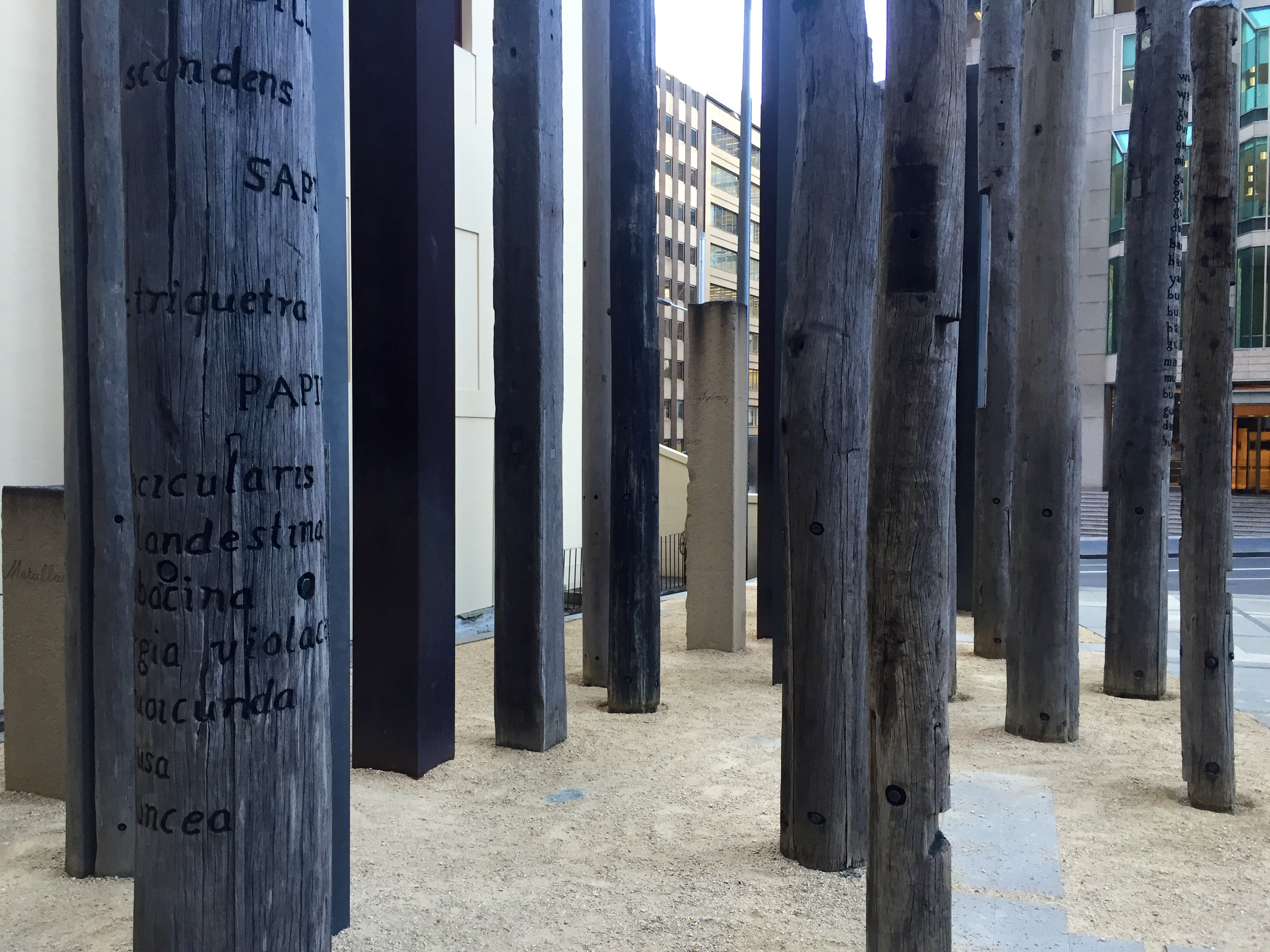
Close up view of one of the timber pillars with Latin and Aboriginal language engravings

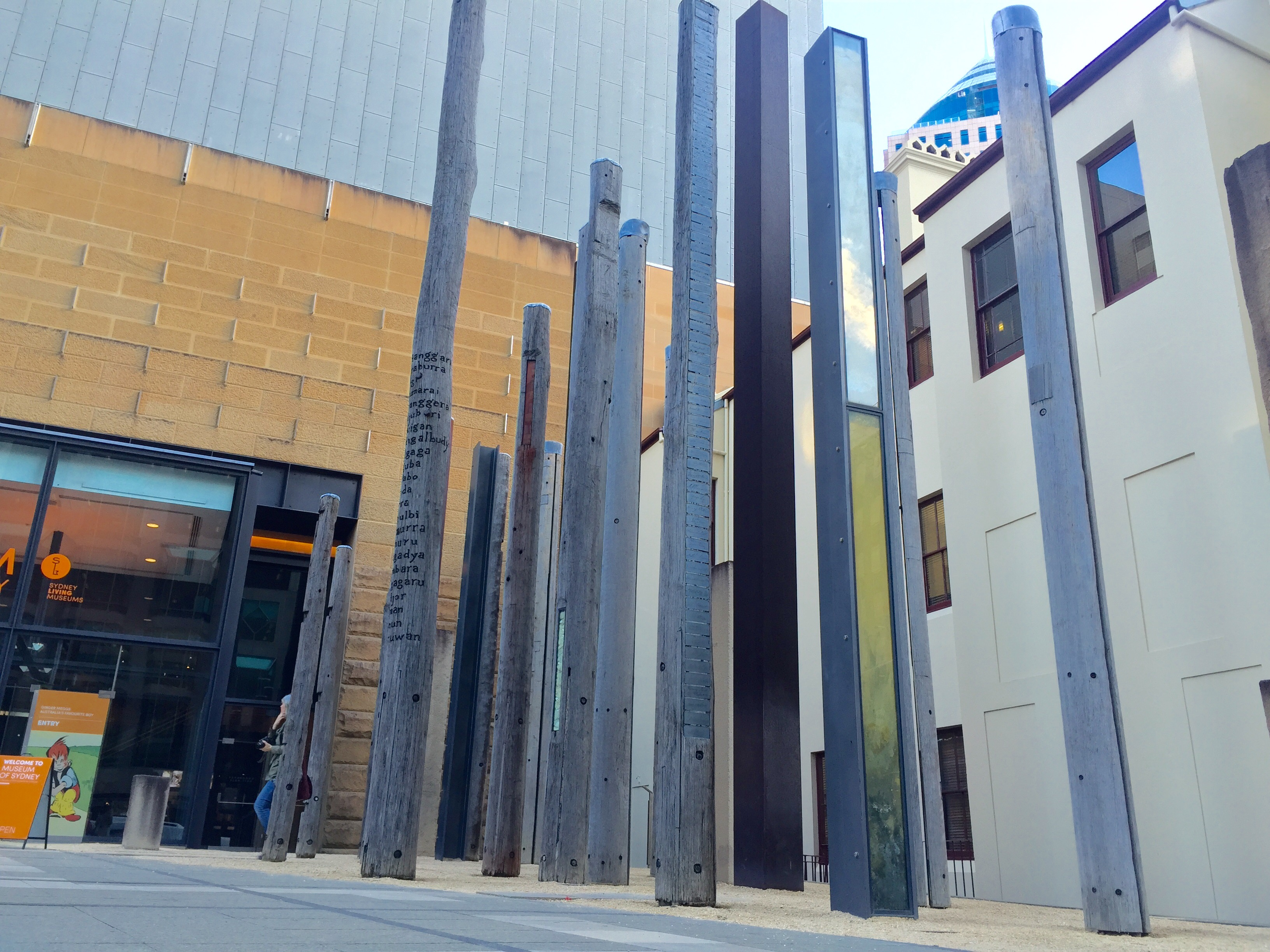
Side view of the installation work from street level

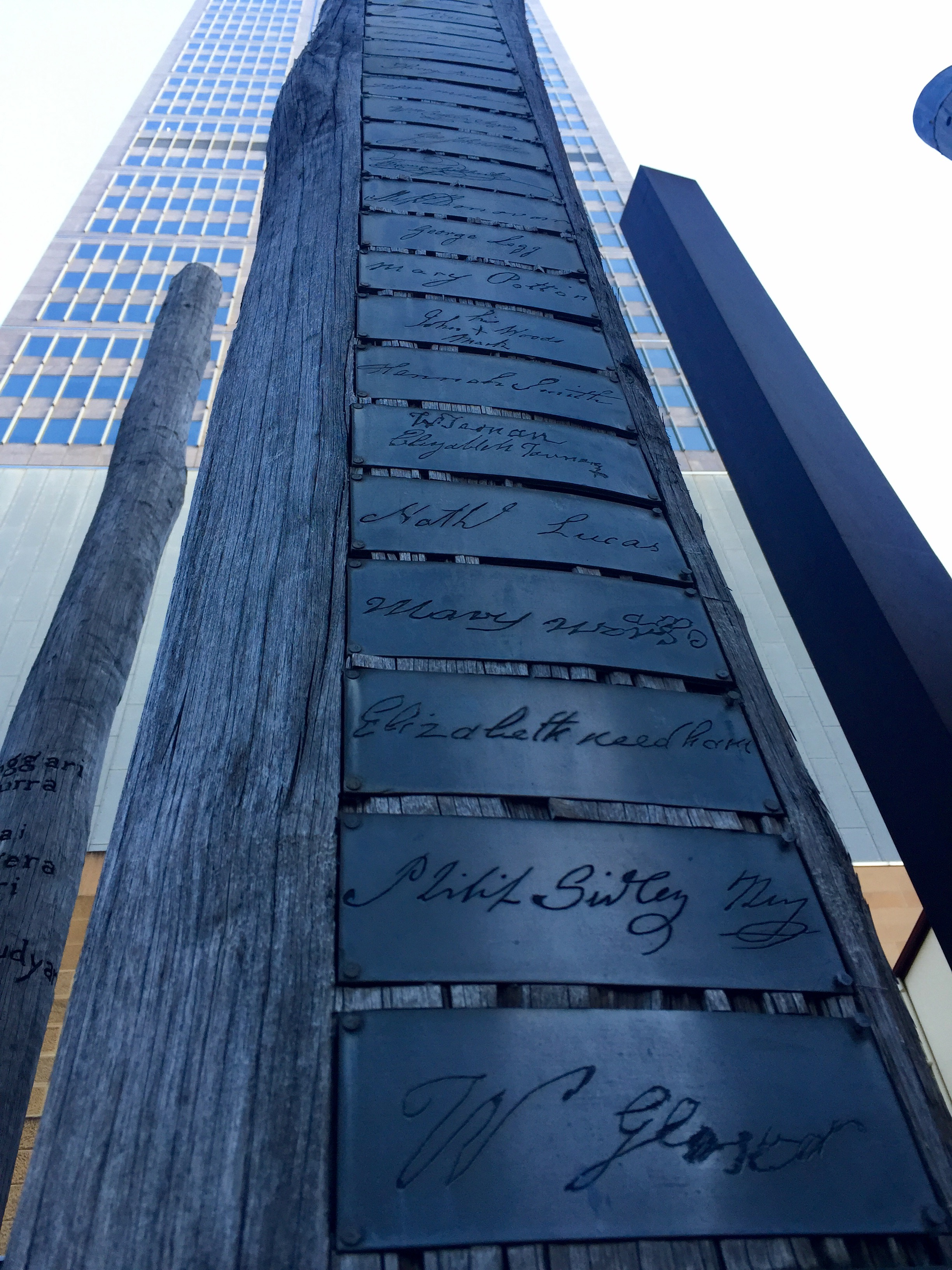
Engraving of the names of the First Fleeters that arrived in Sydney in 1788 on metal sheets joint onto timber pillars

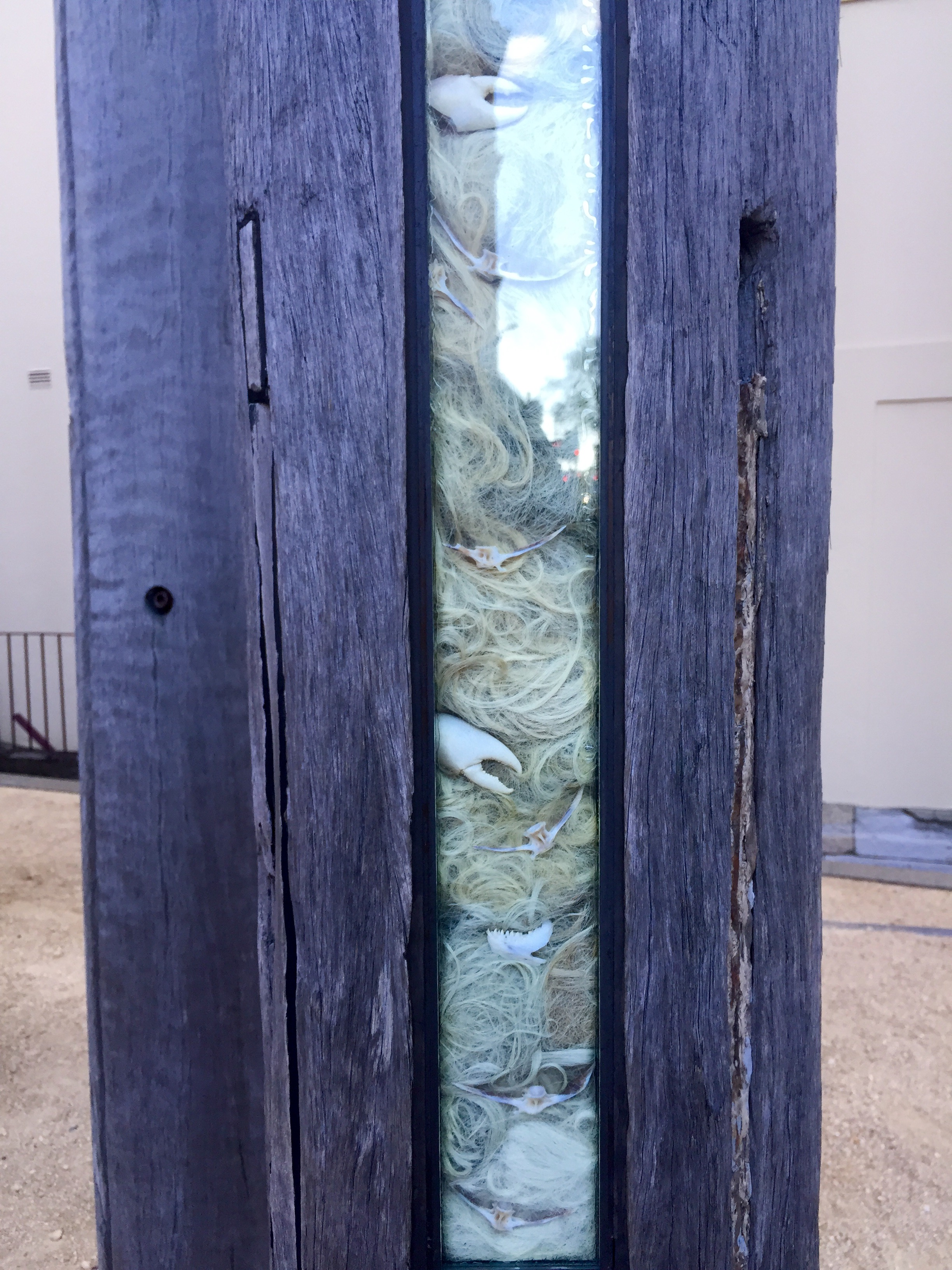
Close up of organic materials such as hair, shell, bone, and feathers embedded in windows of timber pillar

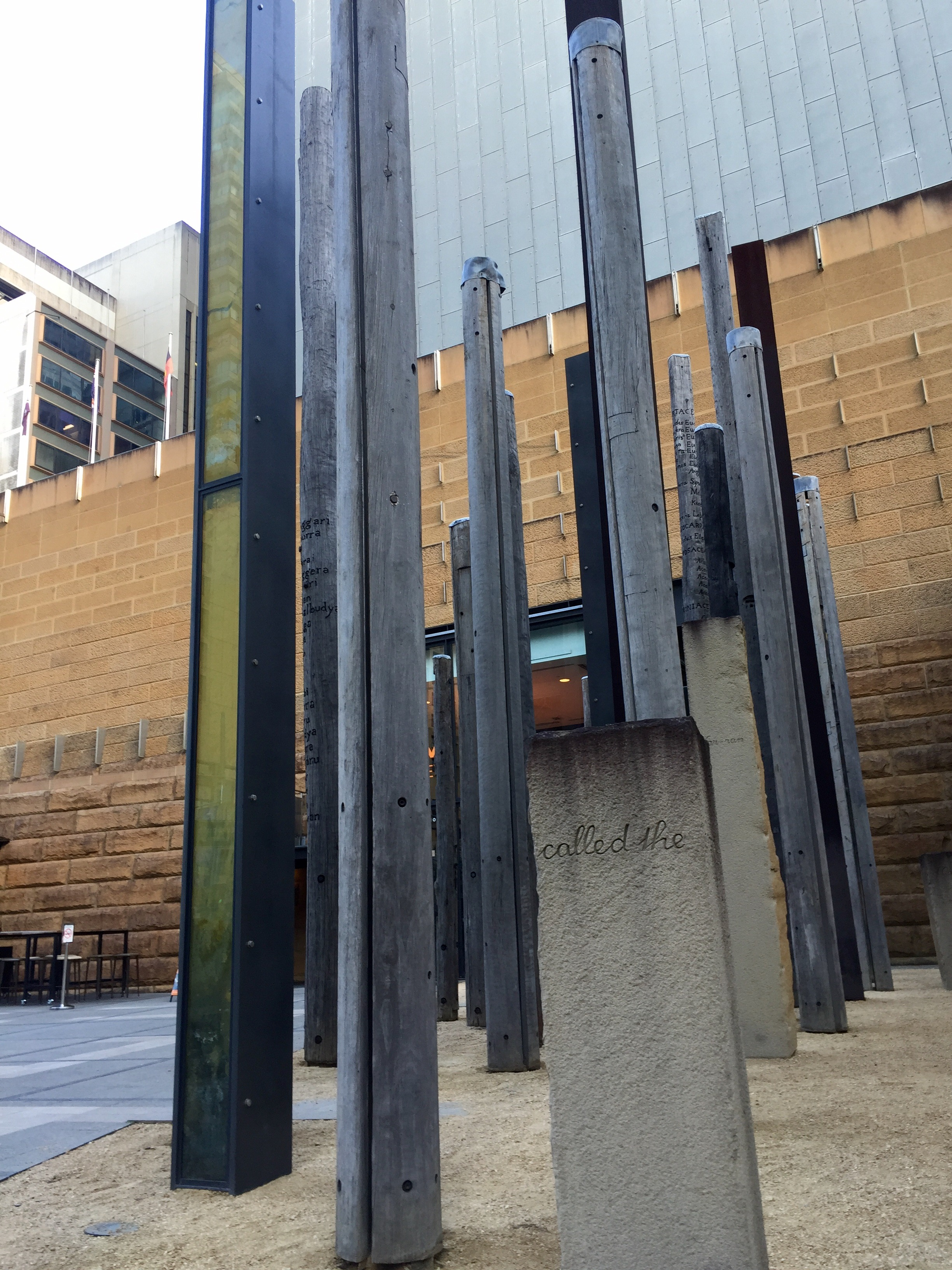
Side view of installation work with museum entrance at the background

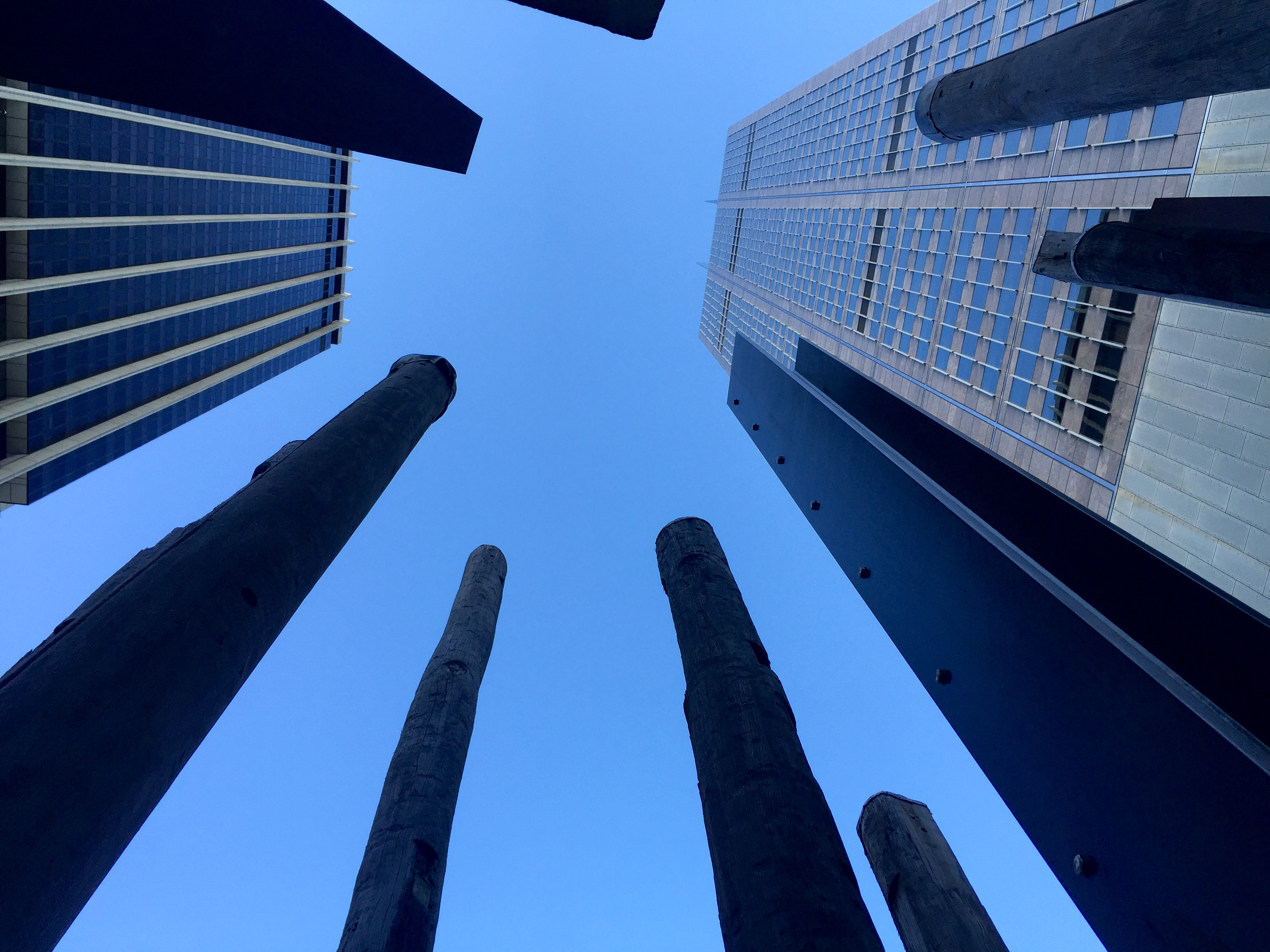
View of the sky from between the pillars

== See also ==
- Veil of Trees
