= Johnny Campbell (bushranger) =

Aboriginal Australian outlaw

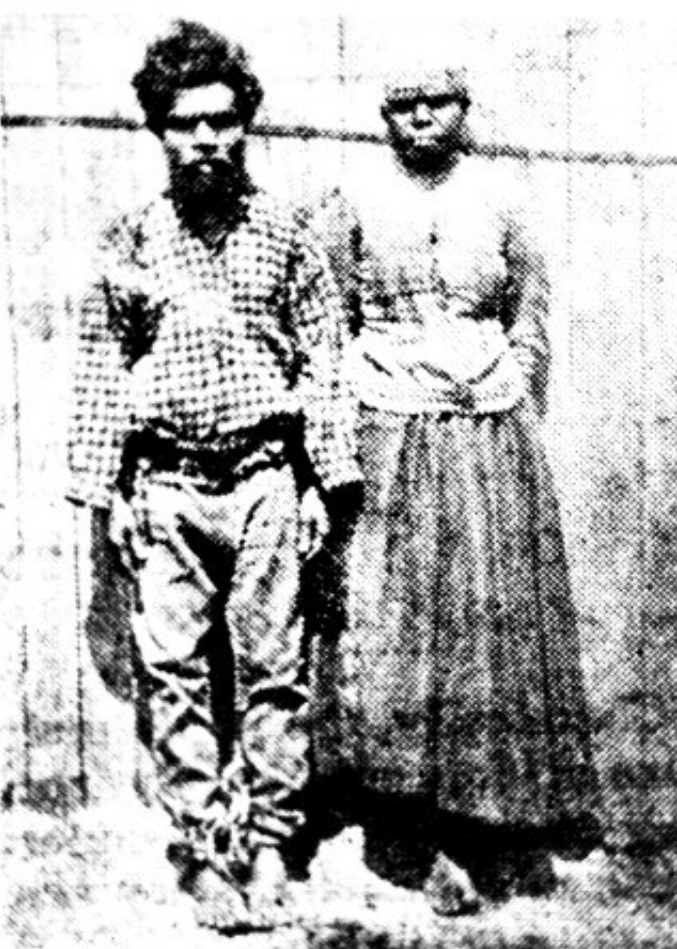
- Johnny Campbell ('Kaigaru') in Tewantin, 1880
- Born: Kagariu; 1846; Yabber Creek, Colony of New South Wales
- Died: 16 August 1880 (aged 33–34); Brisbane Gaol, Brisbane, Colony of Queensland
- Cause of death: Execution by hanging
- Occupation: stockman
- Spouse: Nelly
- Parent: Kami
- Status: Executed
- Convictions: Rape; Assault with intent to commit rape Indecent assault with intent to commit rape
- Penalty: Death

Johnny Campbell (1846 – 16 August 1880) was a Kabi bushranger active in South East Queensland. He was hanged in Brisbane Gaol in 1880.

== Early life ==
Kagariu was born at Imbil on Yabber Creek (now known as Yabba Creek) in Baiyambora territory into the Dherwain section of the Dilbai moiety. His mother, Kami, was of the Bonda-gan section, and his father was a Barang of the Kopait-lhin moiety. It is thought that his father was killed during the Frontier Wars as part of a reprisal for spearing sheep. His mother went on to marry his paternal uncle, Bual, and later gave birth to a half-brother, Kilkaibriu.

As a young boy, Kagariu learned horsemanship before moving to Drayton, to work as a stockman. He returned to his clan a few years later, who were then residing on John Mortimer's Manumbar Station. During his time on Manumbar, he attended the Sabbath School run by Mrs. Mortimer. In 1865, he met John Mortimer's nephew, John Mathew, and rescued him from drowning in a waterhole. Mathew described him as being '5 ft 3in in height' and weighing 40 kg, with 'thick, long, wavy and tangled' hair and attired in 'a blue serge shirt gathered at the waist by a saddle strap.'

== Work as a stockman and first arrest ==
Around 1865, Campbell was accused of molesting the daughter of a shepherd. He and an associate robbed the shepherd's hut and fled the station. In 1867, he returned to Manumbar to continue working as a stockman. By this time, the station workers believed he was innocent. Around this time, he married a woman of the Balkuin-gan section, known as Nelly, who gave birth to their son. In 1871, Campbell and Nelly became estranged after an incident in which he beat her and made her dive into a waterhole to retrieve his tomahawk. He then worked as a stockman for Edgar Foreman at Lake Dunethin. He got into a drunken fight one weekend and had his wounds tended by Foreman. Foreman then moved south to the Pine River, and Campbell returned to Manumbar.

On 4 June 1871, he was delivering rations to a shepherd's hut on Manumbar when the shepherd, Thomas O'Farrell, made arrangements for him to look over his sheep while he was away in Black Snake. During this time, Campbell was said to have assaulted the wife of the shepherd, Eliza O'Farrell. He then fled to Nanango, where he stole a horse and abducted an Aboriginal-Chinese girl from Gayundah. He went into hiding with Aboriginal people on Boonara Station, where he was betrayed to the station owners and held captive for a week. He was taken to Maryborough and, in October 1871, was sentenced to ten years penal servitude for assault with intent to rape and indecent assault with intent to rape.

== Bushranging ==
In 1879, Campbell was released from gaol on good behaviour. He stated to a settler that he intended to treat white women the same way white men treated native women. On 12 June, he held up and robbed two isolated farmhouses near Black Snake, and on 20 June, he robbed a further three houses at Mount Coora. On 25 June, it was reported that a woman had been attacked four miles from Tiaro. The police were sent in pursuit, and he led them on a chase around the Upper Mary. He stole a gun and ammunition from a hut near Gympie. On 23 July, he attacked a residence on Lochaber Station, near Gayndah, firing a gun at the house. In the morning, his stolen horse was found nearby, and he travelled to Dalgangal Station, where he stole another horse. The police tracked him from Bandon Station to Mount Perry. He was reportedly seen in the vicinity riding a black horse with his face whited and armed.

On 3 August, an Aboriginal woman attended the Kilkivan police barracks and reported that Campbell had visited her hut the previous night. Campbell attempted to convince an Aboriginal man named Wild Toby to procure grog for him. The man reported this to the head station, and a party of station workers rode out with breechloaders in an attempt to apprehend him. They attempted to sneak up on the hut, but Campbell was alerted to their presence when the dogs near the hut started barking. He ran towards the party and, on seeing them, crossed a creek and disappeared over a ridge. The party fired at him and gave chase, and during their pursuit encountered three mounted marsupial scalpers who had lost sight of him. In the evening of the same day, Campbell reportedly rode up to another hut near Cinnabar, belonging to an Aboriginal shepherd, and attempted to kidnap his daughter. When the shepherd's wife attempted to intervene, he assaulted her.

On 15 August, he was spotted outside a property near Gympie. He stole food and a watch and threatened to shoot a woman with a shotgun if she intervened. In September, he attempted to rob two houses near Kilcoy. He had two women in his company who he used as scouts, sending them to nearby farmhouses to request food and tobacco. On 27 September, he held up a woman at gunpoint at a house near the police paddock in Gympie until her husband scared him off. The police arrived two hours later to track him, and he was reportedly spotted at the Rise and Shine Inn in Kilkivan that evening. On 29 September, he robbed a hut at Yumana Creek near Imbil.

By October, Campbell was reportedly hiding out in the thick scrub country around Eel Creek and was nearly caught while robbing a timber-getters' camp on Amamoor Creek. On 31 October, he held up a bullock-driver, and on 2 November, he was seen by a digger named O'Sullivan in Ringtail Scrub. Campbell reportedly fired at him and fled. Constable Tom King, who had recently returned to Queensland after hunting Ned Kelly with a detachment of Queensland Native Mounted Police, followed him with the assistance of an Aboriginal tracker to a bush pigsty where Campbell was hiding out and attempted to apprehend him. Campbell got away and was next seen in early November sticking up an outstation at Durundur, where he stole a double-barrel shotgun and 19 shillings an hour after trackers hunting him had departed the station.

On 13 November, it was announced that the Colonial Secretary, Arthur Hunter Palmer, had declared Campbell an outlaw and offered a £25 reward for his capture. He was rumoured to have died by eating flour laced with arsenic. On 17 December, he stuck up two houses on the Pine River.

== Capture ==
On 15 January, Constable King and Constable Small, with six Aboriginal trackers, rode to Durundur and started on foot up the Stanley River in heavy rain. They received a report that Campbell had robbed a property 30 miles south of them, rode all night, and arrived at the spot the next morning. He was spotted a few days later at the head of the Pine River. The police searched Neurum Creek and afterward divided into two parties. King's party found Campbell's tracks and followed him into the mountains. Campbell was hopping between boulders to hide his tracks and constructed spouts out of bark to collect rainwater in the absence of waterholes. The police discovered a camp where Campbell had been practicing his shooting.

On 10 February, Campbell attended a farmhouse on Kipper Creek, near Northbrook. He asked a farmer's wife, Mrs Stewart, and her sister, 15-year-old Jane McAlister, for matches and leaned on a wagon talking to them for some time. It began to rain, and the farmer's wife gave him a sack to wear over his shoulders. He then reputedly drew his revolver and raped Jane McAlister. The police discovered his tracks at the head of Flagstone Creek and followed them to Delaneys Creek, where he had stuck up a bullock-driver three days earlier. King's police party met up with Sergeant Campbell's party, and together they followed the tracks up the Stanley River, where they soon discovered Campbell and his female companion had been walking over his tracks backwards to mislead them, as well as crossing and recrossing watercourses, and walking in the river to hide his tracks. Heavy rain obliterated the tracks once they were found again.

The police returned to Durundur for supplies and tracked Campbell to a mountain near Neurum Creek. The party split into groups, and Sergeant Campbell, with a tracker named Billy, came across the bushranger and a shootout took place in which Billy was shot by Campbell in the shoulder. King followed the bushranger's tracks to where he had camped and discovered a billy of tea and a handkerchief. Further along the tracks, he found the spot where the bushranger had stopped to reload his firearm. A heavy thunderstorm washed out the tracks, so the pursuit was given up, and the police returned to Durundur for horses.

Campbell fled into the mountains and followed little-known pathways up the range. He followed the watershed of the Mary River, then crossed mountain country east toward the coast. He was spotted by a group of school children on Bury's Flat. On 14 March, he slept at a house in Tewantin, and the next morning was captured by two Aboriginal men in a paddock, who tied him up with a clothesline. He was carried up the main street of town by a procession of townspeople to the police station. The men who captured him were given a whale boat, fishing net, and rations as a reward. Johnny Griffin, one of the police trackers involved in the capture, was given a breastplate by the Queensland Government.

== Trial and death ==
Campbell was transferred to Gympie, and then to Maryborough. On 3 April, he faced court before Judge Blake and was sentenced to 14 years penal servitude for robbery under arms. On 10 May, he was committed for trial without bail on the rape charge in the Ipswich Circuit Court, with Jane McAlister, Dr. Alexander Mackintosh MD, Flora Macdougal Stewart, and Samuel Bolden called as witnesses. On 12 May, Dr. Mackintosh examined Jane's hymen. The prosecution argued that Campbell had pointed a pistol at Mrs. Stewart and asked for 'a scrape' with her sister, Jane. The jury deliberated for 15 minutes before handing down a guilty verdict. Campbell was reported to have said prior to the sentencing, "There's some story there; I did not do such thing; that woman tell lot of lie on me; I’m not supposed to be guilty; he [referring to female witness] says a lot of stories about me putting revolver to his head; I was standing by Creek and he called me down himself; before that he asked me how much money I had; I'm not supposed to be guilty." Campbell was given the death sentence.

He was hanged at Brisbane Gaol on 16 August at 8am. The government reportedly brought people of his tribe down to Brisbane to witness the execution. He was accompanied to the scaffold by Reverend J. K. Black. Campbell wept as he was brought from his cell. His last words were said in response to a farewell from one of his gaolers. He said, "All the same, now; good bye."

On the day after the execution, Nicholas Miklouho-Maclay, known as the 'Moon Man', removed Campbell's brain and photographed it for study. The next day he removed the intestines and began preserving the corpse. After two months the preservation process was completed, and he had the body sent to Professor Rudolf Virchow in Berlin for further study and dissection.

== See also ==
- List of Indigenous Australian historical figures

== Sources ==
- Prentis, Malcolm D. (1991), "The Life and Death of Johnny Campbell", Aboriginal History, 15: 138–152
- Holthouse, Hector (1973), Gympie Gold
