= Veil of Trees =

Coordinates: 33°51′54.54″S 151°13′11.16″E

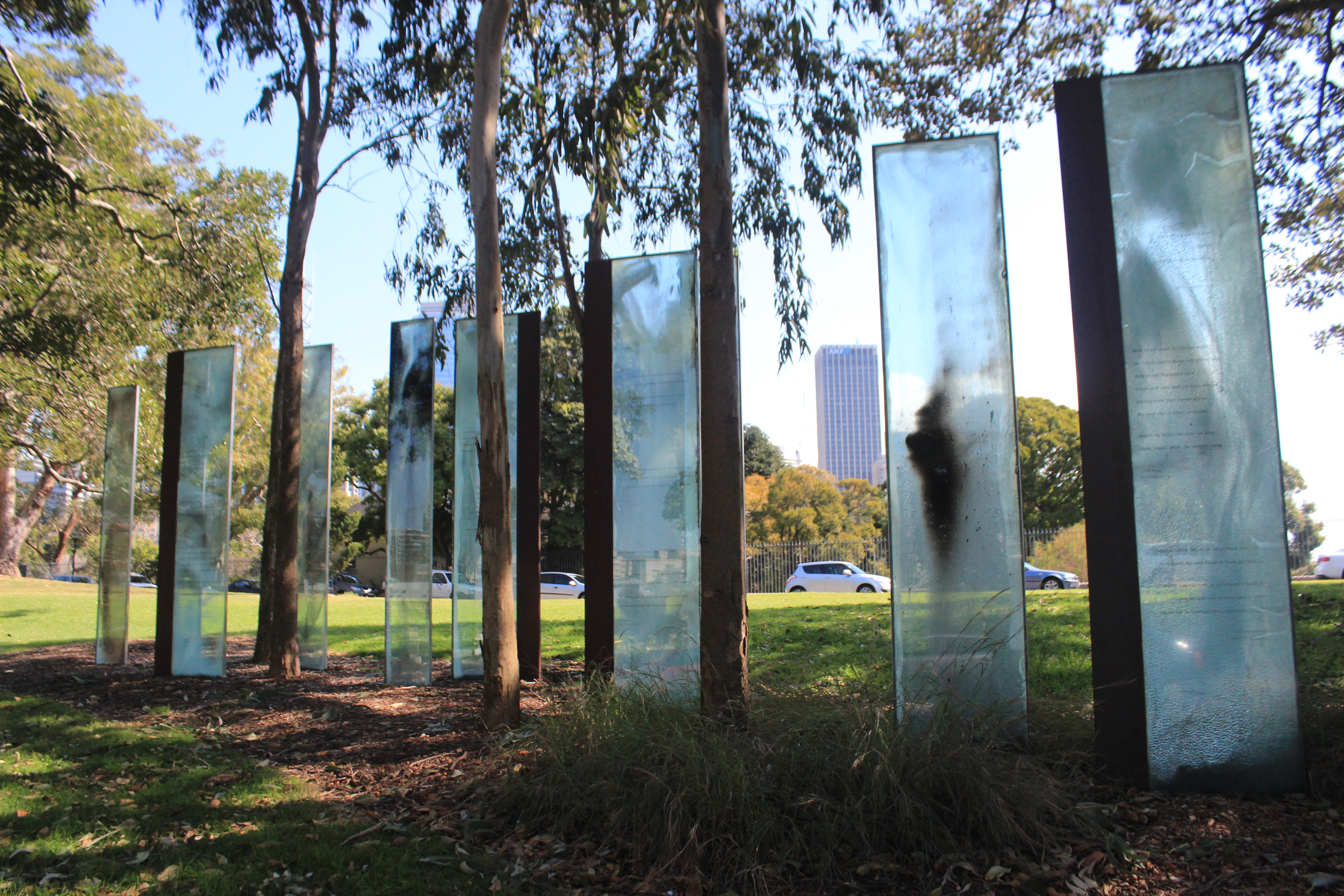
Veil of Trees at the Domain, Sydney Australia

Veil of Trees is an art installation within the grounds of the Royal Botanical Gardens in Sydney. The work was designed by Janet Laurence and Jisuk Han as part of the Sydney Sculpture Walk Program in 1999, to highlight the indigenous botanical history of the site. It consists of 21 glass panels among one hundred red forest gums (Eucalyptus tereticornis) which run along a one hundred metre grassed ridge between two parallel roads.

== Description ==
Inscriptions

It’s trees I look for nowadays,
year after year
adding their rings. Recording
this month’s frost, that season’s
burning, the arrival
and departure of leaves, birds,
mice, barefoot invaders,
and applecore wars
in the kingdom of twigs.
…the tree
is dreaming our lives.
Its dust-thick shadow reaches
the road…
David Malouf — from Evergreen

~

Trees were their thoughts:
peppermint gum black-sally,
white tea-tree hung over creeks…
There is
there was
a country
that spoke in the language of leaves.
Judith Wright — from Falls Country

~

There are five different Scribbly Gums, like five
brothers in mythology, each bearing a significant
name: sclerophylla, signata, rossii, racemosa
and see the red rim of its fruit – haemastoma.
Murray Bail — from Eucalyptus

~

New trees step out of old: lemon and ochre
splitting out of grey everywhere, in the gum forest.
In there for miles, shade track and ironbark slope
Sky sifting, and always a hint of smoke in the light;
you can never reach the heart of the gum forest.
Les Murray — from The Gum Forest

The panels are made of glass edged with Corten-steel containing LED lighting. Some panels enclose historically native seeds, ash, honey and resin, while others have verses from poetry written by Australian writers and poets. The play of light on the translucent glass create a passage of reflection, and memory.

The work aims to highlight the native natural environment and indigenous history, as well as the importance of historical preservation through botanical conservatories. The red gums refer to the forest of original gums axed as a result of early European settlement with hopes to rejuvenate the site with its native trees and grass plants.

== Artist collaboration ==
The collaboration was between two artists Janet Laurence and Jisuk Han. Janet Laurence is a Sydney-based artist whose work examines the interconnection of life forms and ecologies. Jisuk Han has worked in interpretive design, art and architecture for more than twenty years and collaborates with artists, architects, curators and museums throughout Australia.

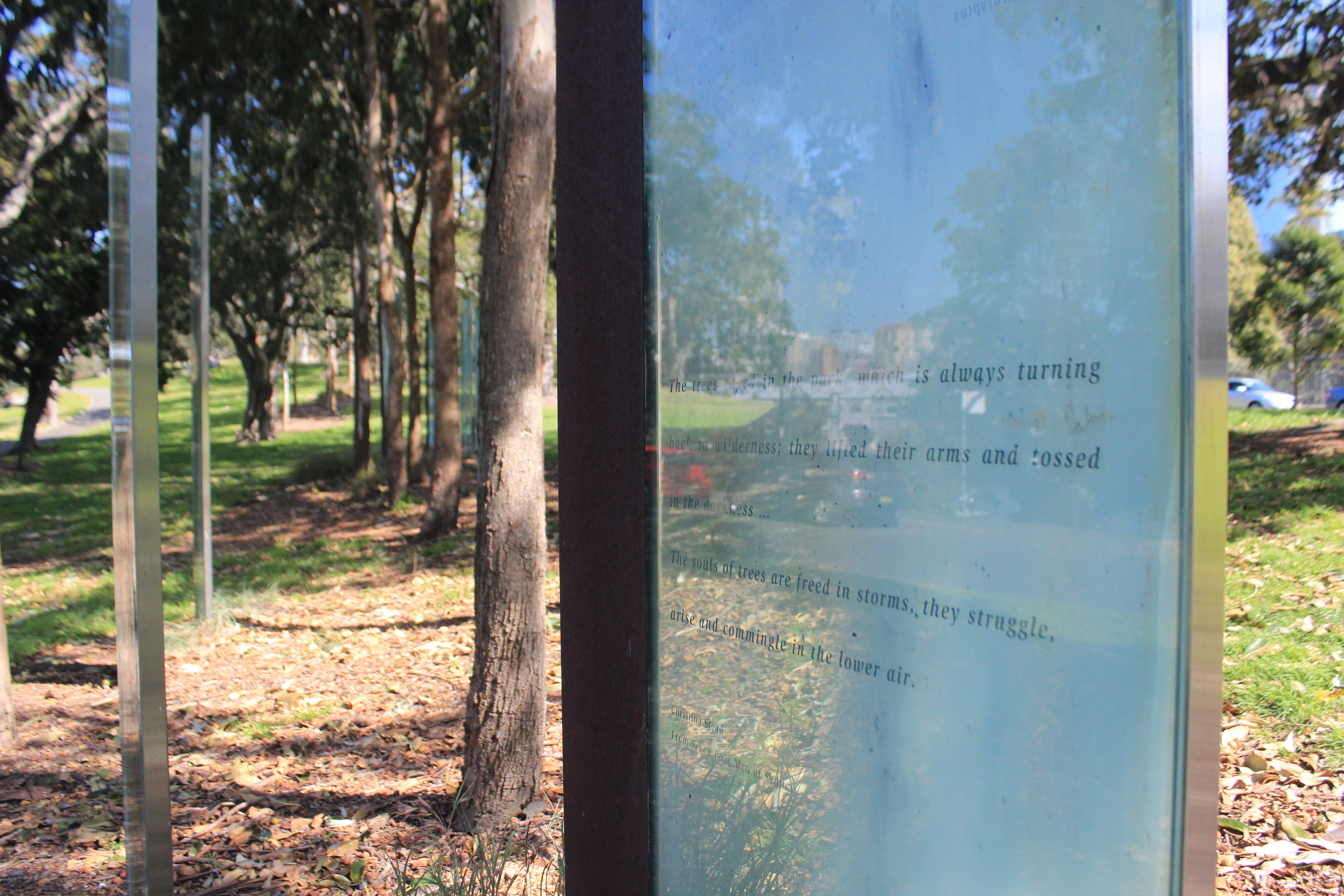
Inscription Text on Glass Panel
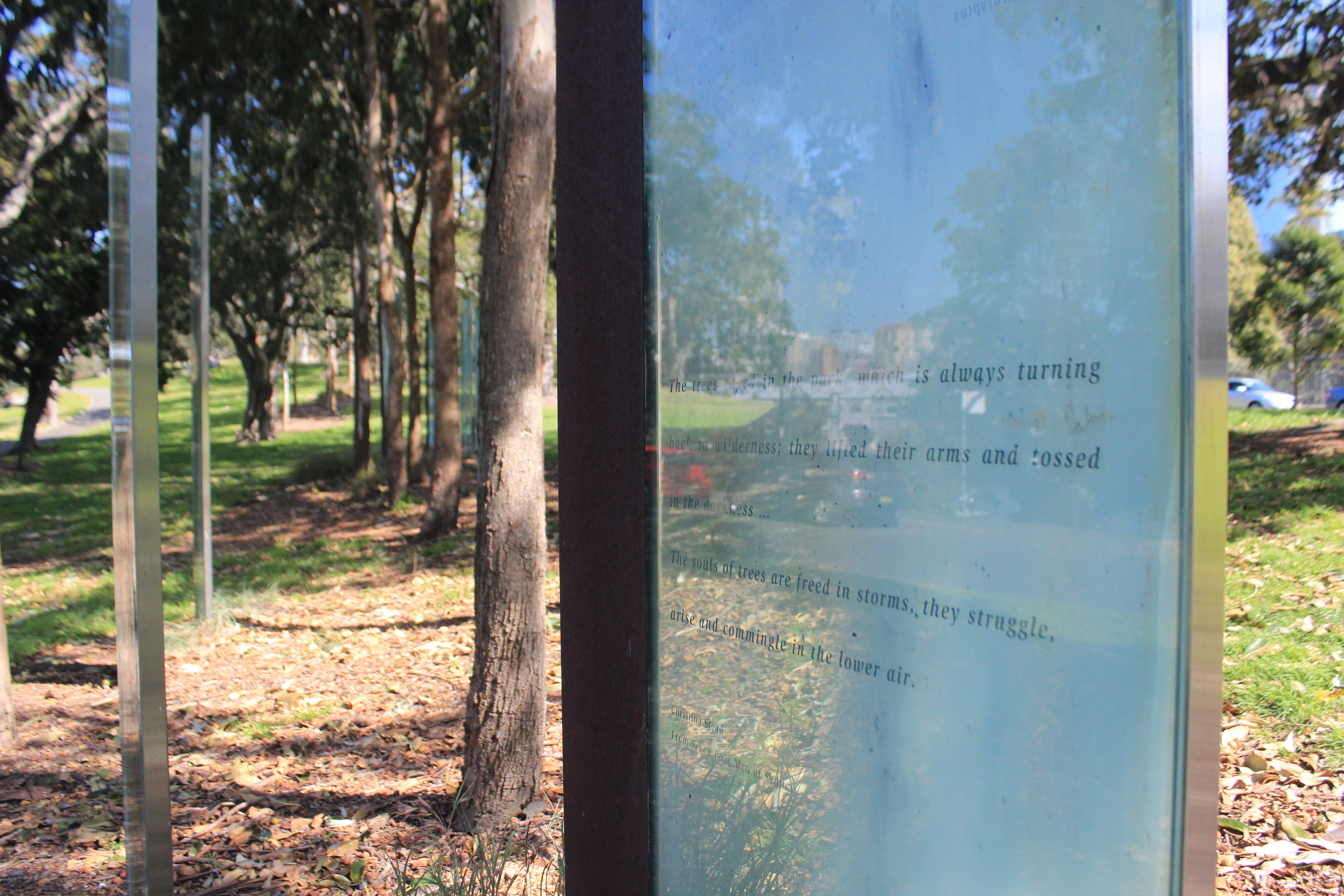
Inscription text on Glass Panel

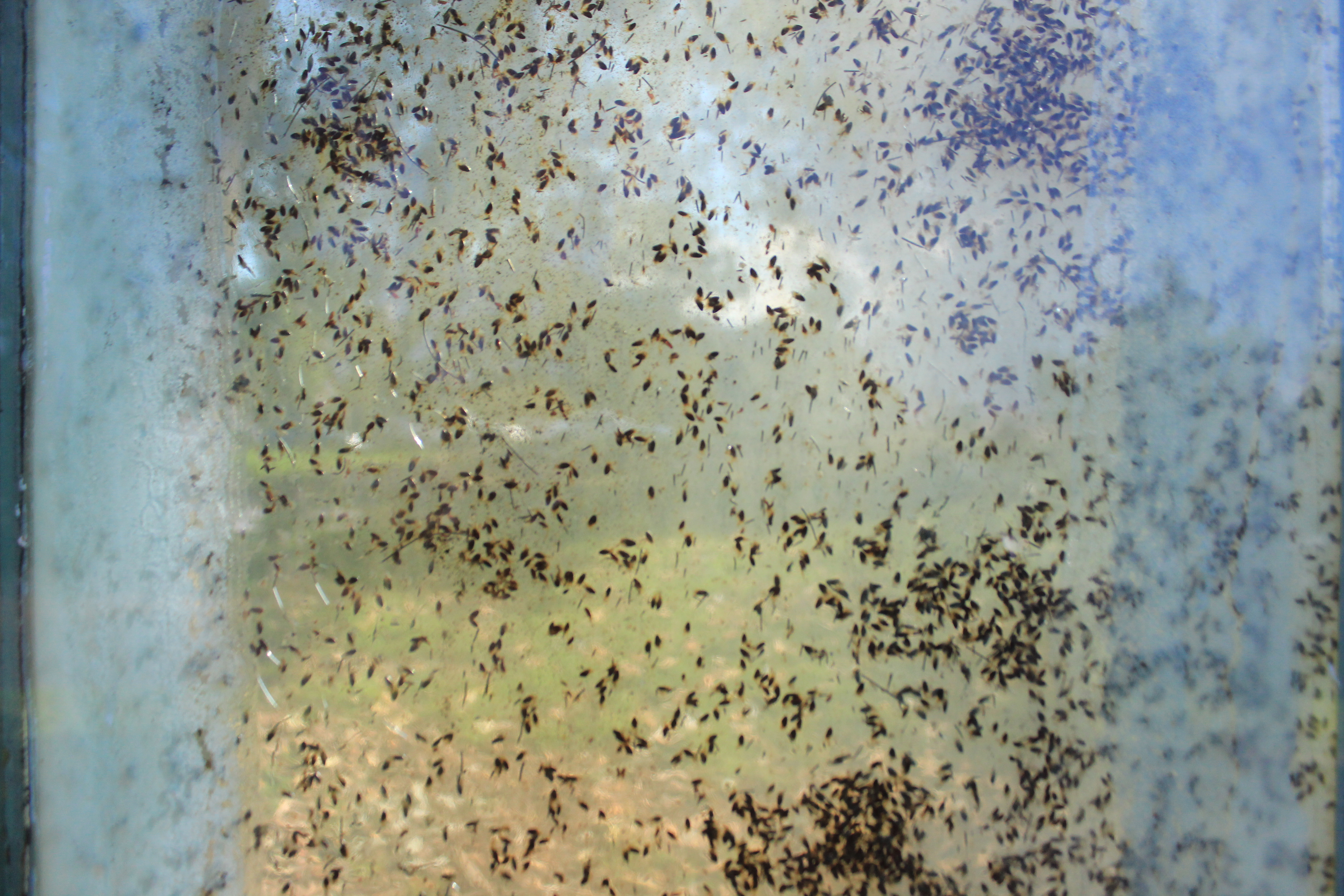
Pressed indigenous seeds

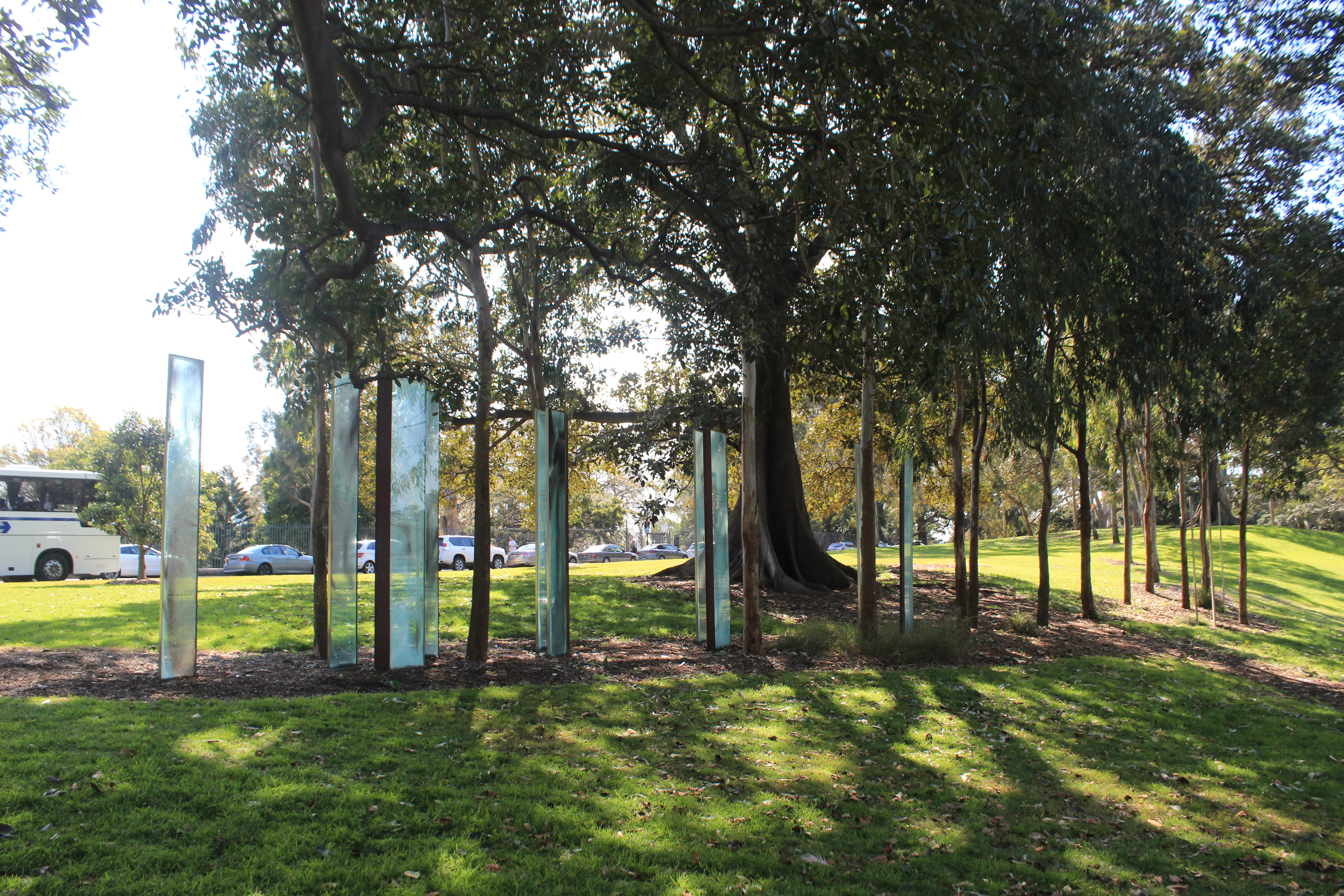
Glass panels among a hundred red forest gums

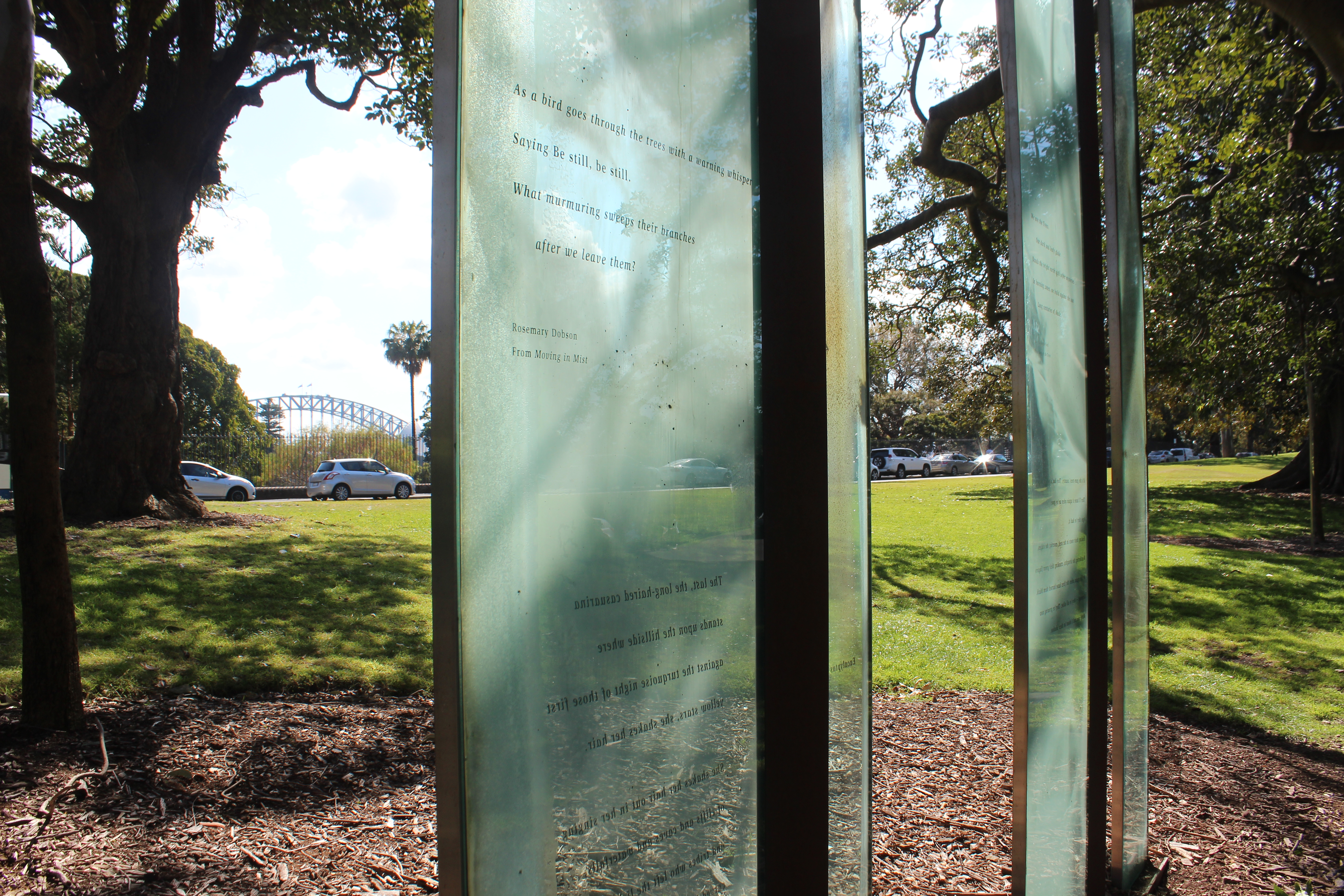
Glass panel

== See also ==
- Edge of the Trees
