= Mount Bauple National Park =

National park in Queensland, Australia

- IUCN category Ia (strict nature reserve)
- Location within Queensland
- Location: Queensland
- Coordinates: 25°48′49″S 152°34′24″E
- Area: 5 km^{2} (1.9 sq mi)
- Established: 1935
- Governing body: Queensland Parks and Wildlife Service

Mount Bauple is a scientific national park in the Fraser Coast Region, Queensland, Australia, 190 km north of Brisbane.

The park's main purpose is to protect the area's exceptional scientific values. Mount Bauple shares its name with the bauple or bopple nut, the local name for the nut from the commercial Queensland nut tree Macadamia integrifolia; both the nut and mountain in turn come from Baphal, the Dreaming caretaker from the Budjilla people indigenous to K'gari (formerly Fraser Island), Queensland. While the bauple plant is cultivated extensively in Queensland and overseas, its natural distribution is extremely limited, and its status in the wild is listed as vulnerable. The commercial value of the species adds considerably to the importance of protecting the wild population.

== See also ==
- Protected areas of Queensland
