= Kabi Kabi people =

Aboriginal Australian people of south-east Queensland

Gubbi Gubbi
Gubbi Gubbi
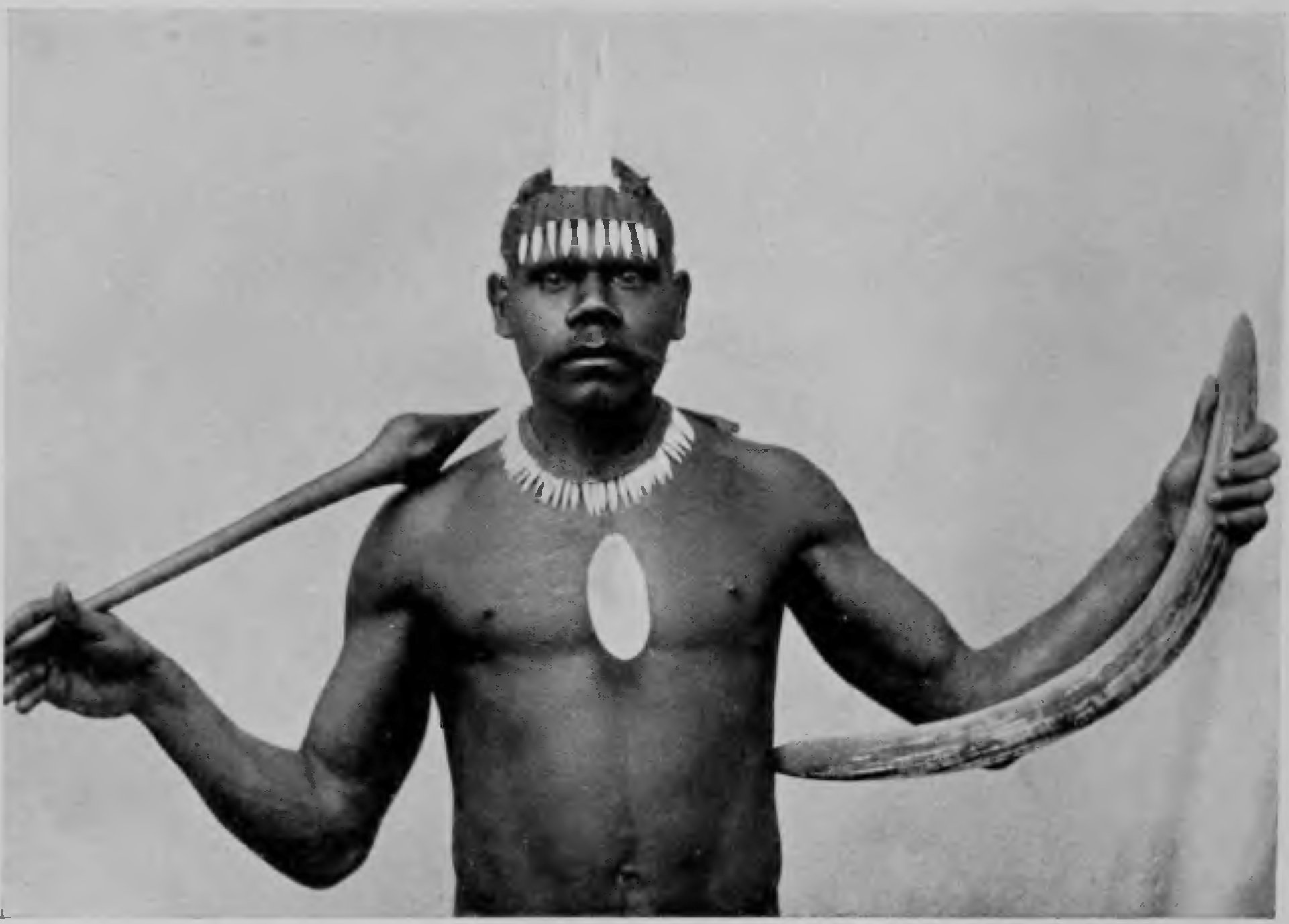

Regions with significant populations
- South East Queensland

Languages
- Gubbi Gubbi language, Australian English

The Kabi Kabi people, also spelt Gubbi Gubbi, Gabi Gabi, and other variants, are an Aboriginal Australian people native to South Eastern Queensland. During the Australian frontier wars of the 19th century, there were several mass killings of Kabi Kabi people by settlers. They are now classified as one of several Murri language groups in Queensland. A 2024 determination granted non-exclusive native title rights over a 365,345-hectare (902,790-acre) area of land and waters on the Sunshine Coast.

== Naming ==
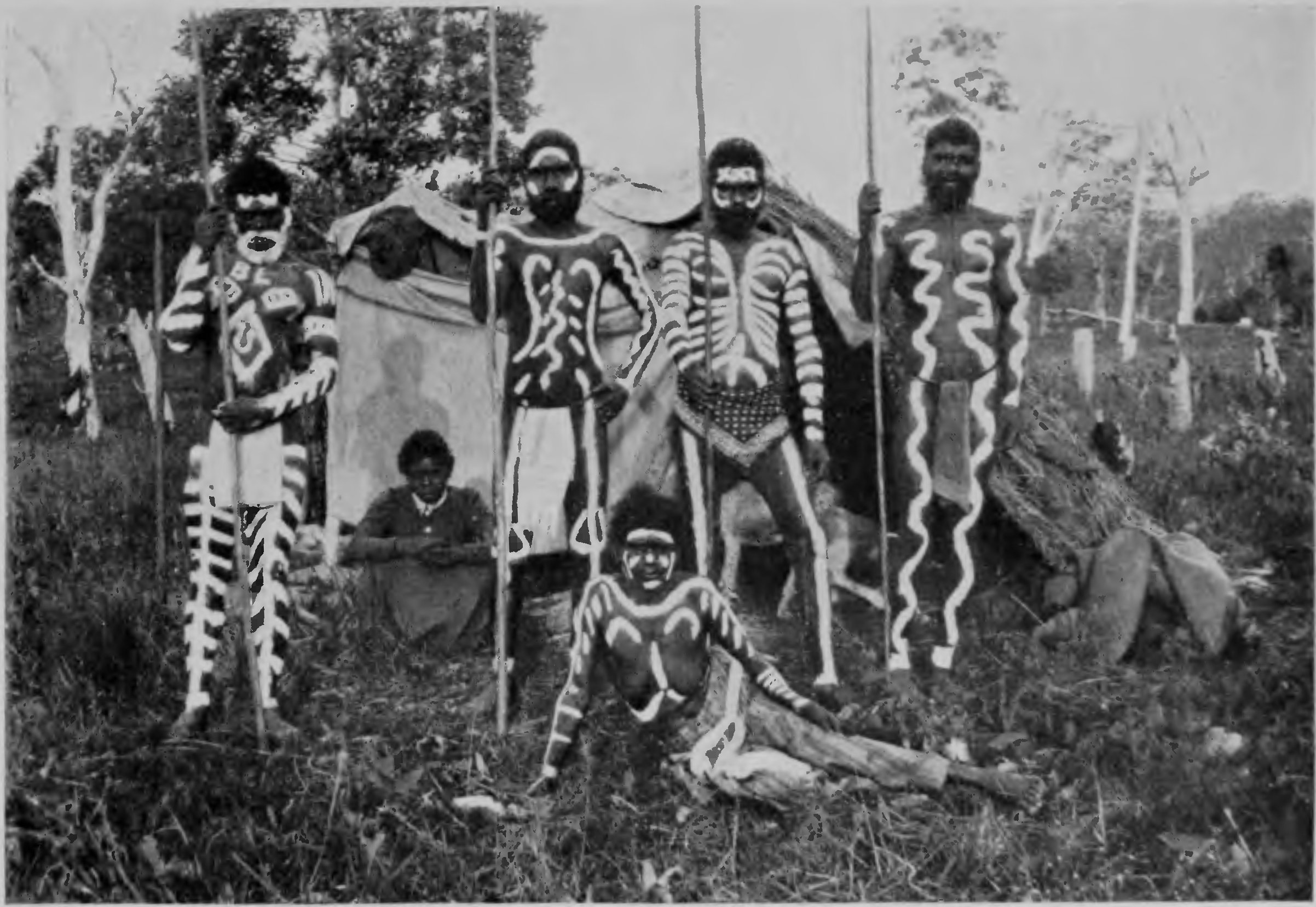
Kabi Kabi people of Yabber (Imbil)

As is often the case, ethnonyms distinguishing one tribe from another select the word used by any one group for the concept "no", which is the meaning of kabi/gubi/gabi. However, AIATSIS's Austlang database prefers Gubbi Gubbi.

In recent times, the name Gubbi Gubbi, which was recorded in early documents, has been used interchangeably with Kabi Kabi. The Australian Institute of Aboriginal and Torres Strait Islander Studies (AIATSIS) favours Gubbi Gubbi as the name of the language, but also gives other spellings and name variants. However, recent publications have referred to the people as Kabi Kabi. Native title claims have been lodged in the name of Kabi Kabi people by the Kabi Kabi Aboriginal Corporation.

There is a dance group called Gubbi Gubbi Dance Troupe that performs traditional dance and Welcomes to Country.

== Country ==
John Mathew, who lived among them, described the Gubbi Gubbi lands as roughly coextensive with the Mary River Basin, though stretching beyond it north to the Burrum River and south along the coast itself. He estimated their territory to cover 8,200 square miles (21,000 km^{2}). According to Norman Tindale, however, the Gubbi Gubbi people were an inland group living in the Wide Bay–Burnett area, and their lands extended over 3,700 square miles (9,600 km^{2}) and lay west of Maryborough. The northern borders ran as far as Childers and Hervey Bay. On the south, they approached the headwaters of the Mary River and Cooroy. Westwards, they reached as far as the Coast Ranges and Kilkivan. Gubbi Gubbi country is currently located between Pumicestone Road, near Caboolture in the south, through to Childers in the north. Their country was originally rain forest, with cleared areas created by regular firing of the scrub. (Note: John Mathew's description of the Gubbi Gubbi people he knew describes their land as embracing 'the Manumbar Run in the south-west corner of the Burnett District, the country watered by the Amamoor and Koondangoor creeks, tributaries of the Mary River, and the Imbil Station (Mathew 1887, p. 152).) Addtionaly, Suzanne Kite and Stephen Wurm describe the traditional country of the Gubi Gubbi as extending across a coastal region from Caboolture in the south to Childers in the north and inland to the Jimna Range, addtionally they consider it possible that the Gubbi Gubbi also inhabited Bribie Island.

Varying estimates of Gubbi Gubbi country

The neighbouring tribes were the Turrbal to the south, the Taribelang north, Goreng Goreng to their northwest and the Wakka Wakka westwards.

=== Native title claims ===
There have been a number of native title claims by various groups of contemporary Gubbi Gubbi/Kabi Kabi people, all through the same representative body, the Southern and Western Queensland Region.

Other groups of descendants, using the "Kabi Kabi" spelling of the name, have made a total of six applications for native title, with some earlier ones combined into later ones and one as of 2021 still active. The first two, made in 2006, were discontinued, while the third in the same year was dismissed. Claims made in 2013, and 2016 were combined, resulting in a sixth claim in 2018, which is still active. This claim covers an area from Redcliffe, not far north of Brisbane to around Isis Junction, in the Bundaberg region, but excluding Maryborough.

In June 2024, the Federal Court under Justice Berna Collier formally recognised a claim over 365,345 ha (902,790 acres) of land and waters on the Sunshine Coast, including Gympie, Noosa, Maroochydore, Caloundra, Bribie Island, and Mudjimba Island. The ruling was significant for two reasons: it was the first to have been granted over an urbanised area on the east coast, and the first occasion on which the right to "take resources from the area for any purpose" was recognised in South East Queensland. Former rights have been restricted to "personal, communal, and non-commercial purposes". The decision relates to Part A of the Kabi Kabi people's claim, with two further parts still to be determined. The rights are non-exclusive, meaning that they are subject to state and federal laws, and do not include freehold land. The area includes many sacred and ceremonial sites, including bora rings, and sites where paintings and axe-grinding stones exist. The determination makes no difference to residents living within the boundaries of the title, and there is no right to block access to anyone from crown land, but that Kabi Kabi people could help to share their cultural heritage, as well as activities such as cultural burning to help care for the environment. The Sunshine Coast Council hopes to increase public access to culturally significant land, and provide educational tools such as signposts and information boards on walking trails.

== Language ==
The Dictionary of the Gubbi-Gubbi and Butchulla languages, compiled by Jeanie Bell, with assistance from Amanda Seed, was published in 1994. The dictionary includes both Gubbi-Gubbi and Butchulla language vocabularies with an English finder-list; sources of words given; and notes on phonology, morphology, and syntax.

== History of contact ==
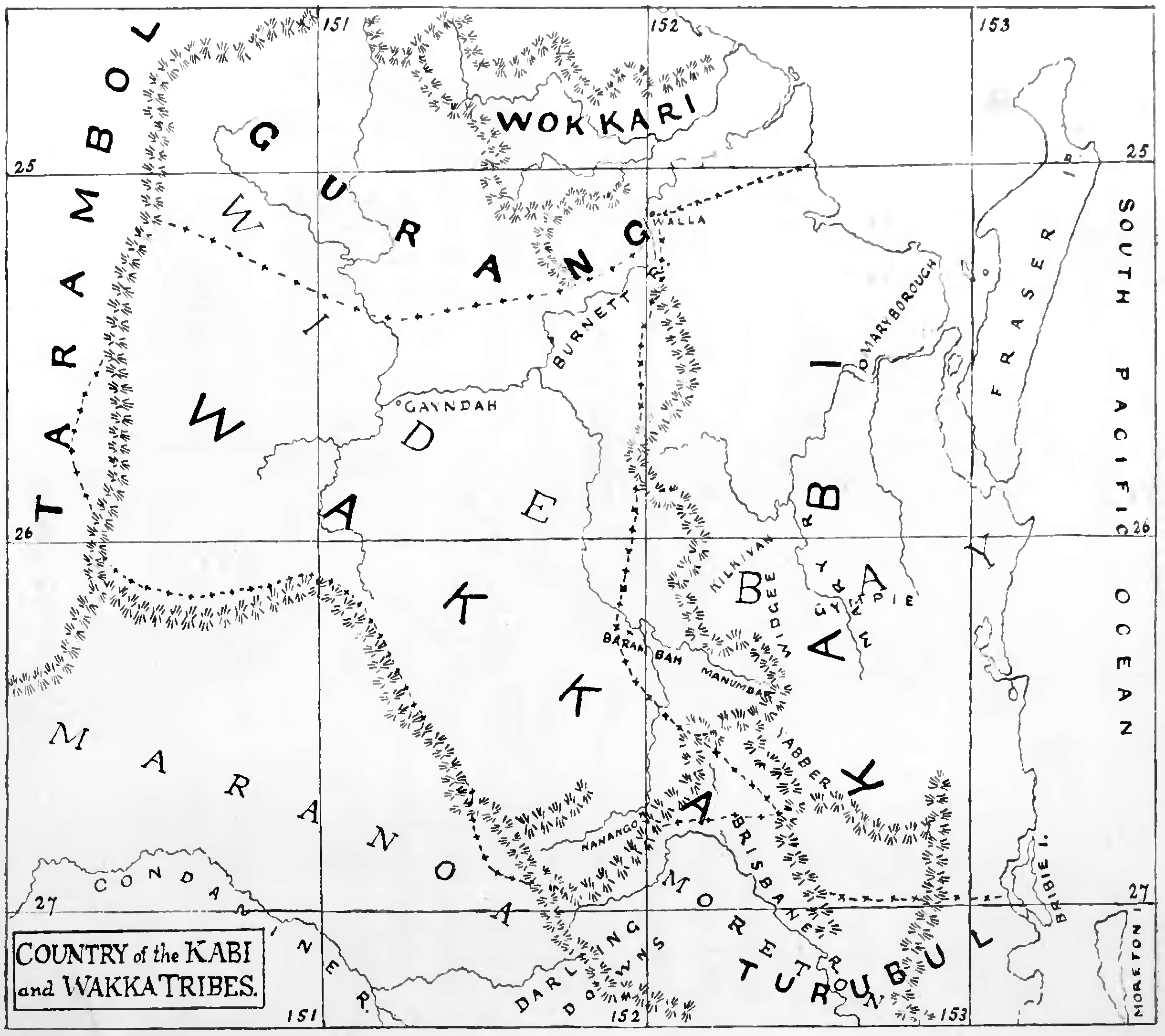
John Mathew's 1910 map of the country of the Kabi and Wakka peoples

During the colonisation of Queensland, there were particularly bloody frontier wars as settlers moved onto land that had been occupied by Aboriginal peoples for millennia.

Some Gubbi Gubbi/ Kabi Kabi died in the mass poisoning of upwards of 60 Aboriginal people on the Kilcoy run in 1842. A further 50-60 are said to have been killed by food laced with arsenic at Whiteside Station in April 1847. As colonial entrepreneurs pushed into their territory to establish pastoral stations, they together with the Butchulla set up a fierce resistance: from 1847 to 1853, 28 squatters and their shepherds were killed.

In June 1849 two youths, the Pegg brothers, were speared on the property while herding sheep. Gregory Blaxland, the 7th son of the eponymous explorer Gregory Blaxland took vengeance, heading a vigilante posse of some 50 squatters and station hands and, at Bingera, ambushed a group of 100 sleeping people of the "Gin gin tribe" who are usually identified now as the Gubbi Gubbi. They had feasted on stolen sheep. Marksmen picked off many, even those fleeing by diving into the Burnett River. The slaughter was extensive, and the bones of many of the dead were uncovered on the site many decades later. Blaxland was in turn killed in a payback action sometime in July–August 1850. His death was revenged in a further large-scaled massacre of tribes in the area. (Note: A force was organized among all these settlers and their employees, and they set out on their mission of revenge guided by the friendly gin already referred to. The fugitive blacks were tracked down the Burnett River, where they had foregathered at a place now called Paddy's Island, not far from the mouth of the river. It was estimated by the white party that there were about a thousand blacks congregated here when the attack was made, and the result was the blacks suffered severely. The avenging whites were determined to end the antagonistic blacks' attitude towards their settlements. It is not known how many blacks were killed in this fight, but they must have numbered hundreds; but it is also known that a large number escaped into the Wongarra scrub on the south side of the river. This attack really broke the power of the blacks in this region. They continued to be hostile often in individual cases, but were never afterwards a serious menace (Laurie 1952, p. 713).)

The escaped convict James Davis, in addition to dwelling with several other tribes, is said to have lived for a time with Kabi Kabi people.

John Mathew, a clergyman turned anthropologist, also spent five years with them at Manumbar and mastered their language. During his time there he met Kabi bushranger Johnny Campbell, and described their society in a 1910 monograph, Two Representative Tribes of Queensland. Mathew also wrote an extensive notebook on the language of the Kabi Kabi people, which is now held in State Library of Queensland. The Kabi Kabi people he grew up with numbered no more than a score by the early 1880s, and by 1906, after they had been forcibly removed to the Barambah reserve (an Aboriginal reserve created under the Aboriginals Protection and Restriction of the Sale of Opium Act 1897), he stated that only 3-4 full-blooded members of the group remained among the "remnants".

== Social organisation ==
The Gubbi Gubbi/Kabi Kabi were divided into several clans or bora:

Clan name	Meaning	Location
Dauwa-bora	Noise of hacking people	North of Mount Bopple
Gunda-bora	Cabbage palm people	Mount Bopple
Gigar-bora	Sweet people	Widgee
Kaiya-bora	Bite people	near Widgee
Kunyam-bora	Pine tree people	South of Mount Bopple
Kuli-bora	Native bee people	South Burnett
Baiyam-bora	Pipe people	Yabba Creek (Imbil)
Butyin-bora	unknown	Musket Flat
Wityin-bora	unknown	near Maryborough
Wanggur-bora	unknown	unknown
Kinayin-bora	unknown	unknown
Jakalin-bora	unknown	unknown

== Some words ==
- kavai (small stingless light-grey native bee)
- killa (small stingless dark native bee)
- mothar/dhi (white man)
- mular (ceremonial scars)
- (n)a'von (mother)
- pa'bun (father)
- widha karum (wild dog)
- wiyidha/widha (tame dog)
- wunya (greeting)

== Notable people ==
- Arthur Beetson, Queensland Rugby League player and former Australian captain
- Tahj Minniecon, soccer player who has played for Brisbane Roar, Gold Coast United and Western Sydney Wanderers
- Eve Fesl AM, former champion discus thrower of Victoria and Queensland, and the first Koori to receive a PhD from an Australian university in 1990. She is a member of both the Gubbi Gubbi and Gungulu nations.
- Lance McCallum, Member of the Legislative Assembly of Queensland for the Electoral District of Bundamba, who mentioned his heritage during his inaugural speech on 19 May 2020

== Notes ==
=== Citations ===
Honours

== Sources ==
- "About Us: Kabi Kabi Aboriginal Corporation – kabikabi". kabikabi.
- "Application Details: Glasshouse Mt - Gubbi Gubbi (QC1996/070)". National Native Title Tribunal. 26 June 1996a.
- "Application Details: Gubbi Gubbi People #2 (QC1999/035)". National Native Title Tribunal. 24 December 1999. "Application status: Discontinued"
- "Application Details: Gubbi Gubbi People #3 (QC2008/002)". National Native Title Tribunal. 18 February 2008. "Application status: Discontinued"
- "Application Details: Kabi Kabi First Nation (QC2013/003)". National Native Title Tribunal. 24 December 1999. "Registered from 7/08/2013 to 8/02/2019. Application status Pre-combination"
- "Application Details: Kabi Kabi First Nation Traditional Owners Native Title Claim Group (QC2018/007)". National Native Title Tribunal. 11 December 2018.
- Bottos, Timothy (2013). Conspiracy of Silence: Queensland's Frontier Killing Times. Allen & Unwin. ISBN 978-1-743-31382-4.
- Deming, Willoughby (2015). Understanding the Religions of the World: An Introduction. John Wiley & Sons. ISBN 978-1-118-77055-9.
- Dixon, Robert M. W. (2011). "Australian Aboriginal Words in Dictionaries". In Aikhenvald, Alexandra; Dixon, Robert M. W. (eds.). Language at Large: Essays on Syntax and Semantics. BRILL. pp. 529–553. ISBN 978-9-004-20768-4.
- "E29: Gubbi Gubbi". AIATSIS. 26 July 2019.
- "Eve Fesl". UQP.
- "Extract from Schedule of Native Title Applications" (PDF). National Native Title Tribunal.
- Greer, Germaine (2014). White Beech: The Rainforest Years. A&C Black. ISBN 978-1-408-84671-1.
- Hill, Janine (30 December 2016). "Elder honoured with UN award". Gympie Times.
- Jarratt, Phil (2021). Place of Shadows: The History of Noosa. Boolarong Press. ISBN 978-1-925-87796-0.
- Kind, Peter K. (2016). "The Natural History of the Australian Lungfish Neoceratodus forsteri (Krefft, 1870)". In Jorgensen, Jorden Morup; Joss, Jean (eds.). The Biology of Lungfishes. CRC Press. pp. 61–96. ISBN 978-1-439-84861-6.
- Kovacic, Leonarda (14 May 2019). "Fesl, Eve Mumewa D". Australian Women's Register.
- Laurie, Arthur (27 November 1952). "Early Gin Gin and the Blaxland Tragedy" (PDF). Historical Society of Queensland: 709–717.
- "Map" (PDF). Government of Queensland. 11 October 2013.
- Mathew, John (1887). "Mary River and Bunya Bunya Country" (PDF). In Curr, Edward Micklethwaite (ed.). The Australian race: its origin, languages, customs, place of landing in Australia and the routes by which it spread itself over the continent. Vol. 3. Melbourne: J. Ferres. pp. 152–209 – via Internet Archive.
- Mathew, John (1910). Two Representative Tribes of Queensland (PDF). T. Fisher Unwin. Archived from the original (PDF) on 11 April 2015.
- Mathews, Robert Hamilton (2007). Thomas, Martin Edward (ed.). Culture in Translation: The Anthropological Legacy of R. H. Mathews. Australian National University Press. ISBN 978-1-921-31324-0.
- Maynard, John; Haskins, Victoria Katharine (2016). Living with the Locals: Early Europeans' Experience of Indigenous Life. National Library of Australia. ISBN 978-0-642-27895-1.
- Osbaldiston, Nick (2017). Towards a Sociology of the Coast: Our Past, Present and Future Relationship to the Shore. Springer. ISBN 978-1-137-48680-6.
- Prentis, Malcolm D. (1998). "Research and friendship: John Mathew and his Aboriginal informants". Aboriginal History. 22: 62–93. JSTOR 24046160.
- "Q&A". Gubbi Gubbi (Kabi Kabi).
- "QC2013/003 - Kabi Kabi First Nation". National Native Title Tribunal. 31 May 2013.
- "QUD280/2013 Kabi Kabi First Nation (Combined) Native Title Determination Application" (Map). National Native Title Tribunal. QSNTS. 27 May 2020.
- Reid, Gordon (2006). "That Unhappy Race": Queensland and the Aboriginal Problem, 1838-1901. Australian scholarly publishing. ISBN 978-1-740-97104-1.
- Russo, Frank (7 September 2001). "Registration Test: Edited Statement of Reasons for Publication on NNTT Website" (PDF). National Native Title Tribunal.
- "Search Native Title Applications, Registration Decisions and Determinations [Using "Gubbi Gubbi"]". National Native Title Tribunal.
- "Search Native Title Applications, Registration Decisions and Determinations [Using "Kabi Kabi"]". National Native Title Tribunal.
- Steele, John Gladstone (2015) [First published 1984]. Aboriginal Pathways: in Southeast Queensland and the Richmond River. University of Queensland Press. ISBN 978-0-702-25742-1.
- Tindale, Norman (1974). Aboriginal Tribes of Australia, Kabikabi (QLD). Australian National University Press. Archived from the original on 6 March 2017.
