= Gubbi Gubbi language =

Australian Aboriginal language

Gubbi Gubbi
- Kabi Kabi, Kabi
- Region: Queensland
- Ethnicity: Kabi Kabi (Kabi), Butchulla (incl. Ngulungbara)
- Native speakers: 24 (2016 census, Batjala dialect)
- Language family: Pama–Nyungan: Waka–Kabic; Than; Gubbi Gubbi
- Dialects: Kabi Kabi (Dippil) †; Butchulla (Batjala, Batyala, Badjala)

Official status
- Official language in: Aboriginal Shire of Cherbourg

Language codes
- ISO 639-3: Either: gbw – Kabi-Kabi xby – Batyala
- Glottolog: kabi1260
- AIATSIS: E29 Gubbi Gubbi, E30 Butchulla
- ELP: Gubbi Gubbi
- Batyala
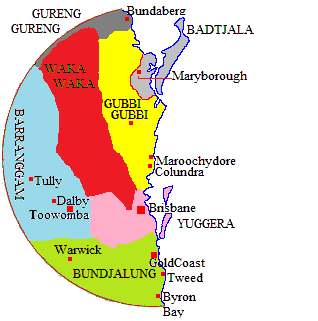
- Map of traditional lands of Aboriginal Australians around Brisbane; Gubbi Gubbi in yellow and Butchulla in light grey

- Badjala is classified as Critically Endangered by the UNESCO Atlas of the World's Languages in Danger.

Gubbi Gubbi, also spelt Kabi Kabi, is a language of Queensland in Australia, formerly spoken by the Kabi Kabi people of South-east Queensland. The main dialect, Gubbi Gubbi, is extinct, but there are still 24 people with knowledge of the Butchulla dialect (also spelt Batjala, Batyala, Badjala, and variants), a language spoken by the Butchulla people of K'gari (Fraser Island).

== Language status ==
The main dialect is extinct, but there were still 24 people with knowledge of the Butchulla dialect (a language spoken by the Butchulla people of K'gari formerly known as Fraser Island) as of the 2016 Australian census.

== Phonology ==
The following is in the Butchulla dialect:

=== Consonants ===
		Labial	Dental	Alveolar	Retroflex/ Palatal	Velar
Stop	plain	b	d̪~ɟ	d		ɡ
Stop	tense	pː	d̪ː			kː
Nasal		m	n̪	n		ŋ
Lateral				l		
Rhotic				r	ɻ	
Approximant		w			j	

- /n̪/ always becomes palatal [ɲ] when preceding /i/, and in word-final position.
- /d̪/ is in free variation with palatal [ɟ].
- /b d̪ ɡ/ can have lenited allophones [β ð ɣ] in intervocalic positions.
- /ɻ/ has a lateral allophone of [ɭ] when preceding /b/.
- /ɡ/ is often slightly palatalised as [ɡʲ] before /i/.

=== Vowels ===
	Front	Back
High	i iː	u uː
Mid	ɛ ɛː	u uː
Low	a aː	

- /aː/ can sometimes be heard as [æː] before /l/.
- /u/ can be heard as [ɔ] when preceding an intervocalic /ɻ/.

== Lexicon ==
According to Norman Tindale (1974), the word Kabi (['kabi]), means "no".

Wunya ngulum means "Welcome, everyone" in Kabi Kabi/Gubbi Gubbi.
