= John Mathew =

Scottish-Australian minister and anthropologist (1849–1929)

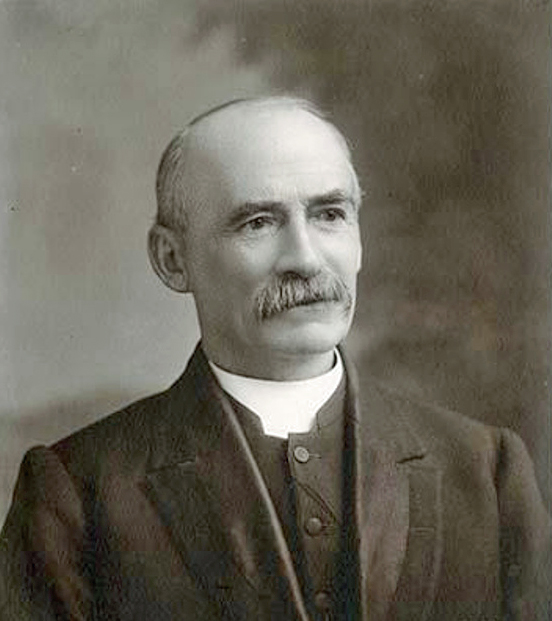
John Mathew, Presbyterian minister and anthropologist

John Mathew (31 May 1849 – 11 March 1929) was an Australian Presbyterian minister and anthropologist, author of "Eaglehawk and Crow" and "Two Representative Tribes of Queensland".

== Biography ==
Mathew was born in Aberdeen, Scotland, on 31 May 1849, the fourth child (and eldest son) of Alexander Mathew, a factory overseer, and his wife Jean, née Mortimer. Mathew was initially educated at Kidd's school, Aberdeen. At nine years of age his father died and he went to live with his maternal grandmother at Insch, where he attended the Insch Free Church School as a pupil-teacher from 1862 to 1864.

In 1864 Mathew migrated to Queensland, Australia, with a brother and sister, to live with their uncle John Mortimer on his station, Manumbar, on the Burnett River. Mathew worked there for six years as a stockrider, bookkeeper, and storeman, becoming familiar with the culture and language of two Aboriginal Australian groups, the Kabi and Wakka Wakka people.

He afterwards tried gold-digging at Imbil and Ravenswood for two years, and then worked as a teacher at Dalby, Queensland, (1872–75) and the Brisbane Normal School (1875–76).

Mathew moved to Victoria, Australia, and graduated from the University of Melbourne (B.A., 1884; M.A., 1886) with first-class honours despite working at times as a tutor and station-manager. As a Presbyterian minister, Mathew worked at Ballan, Victoria, from 1887 for two years, then at Coburg, Victoria, from 1889 to 1923.

Mathew returned to Queensland in 1906, visiting the Kabi and Wakka Wakka people at the Barambah Aboriginal Settlement.

== Publications ==
In 1889 Mathew won the prize and medal of the Royal Society of New South Wales for an essay titled "The Australian Aborigines". This was the basis for his best-known publication, Eaglehawk and Crow (1899). This publication was criticised (as Mathew had expected) by the ethnographers Walter Baldwin Spencer, Alfred William Howitt and Lorimer Fison. There was however, more support from Daisy Bates and Robert Hamilton Mathews.

He published Two Representative Tribes of Queensland in 1910.

== Death and legacy ==
Mathews died on 11 March 1929.

Although his linguistic studies and ethnographic reporting are still well regarded (as of 1986), his controversial theory of a tri-hybrid origin of Australian Aboriginal peoples is not supported by current data.

The State Library of Queensland holds a notebook containing an Aboriginal vocabulary list by John Mathew and other papers including letters from his uncle John Mortimer and cousin G. W. Anderson of Manumbar Station.
