= Wakka Wakka =

Aboriginal Australian people of Queensland

The Wakka Wakka or Waka Waka people are an Aboriginal Australian people of the state of Queensland.

== Name ==
"Wakka" was assigned the meaning "no" by Western linguists who documented the Wakawaka language. Ethnonyms based on the duplication of the respective words for "no" were said to be markers distinguishing one tribe from another in the area, as is also the case with the adjacent Gubbi Gubbi.

== Language ==
The Wakka Wakka language belongs to the Waka–Kabic branch of the Pama-Nyungan languages. Linguistic work by the Presbyterian minister and anthropologist John Mathew and, more recently, by linguists such as Nils Holmer, provided materials that conserved elements of the grammar and vocabulary. Efforts have been undertaken to revive the language and preserve it from extinction. Eidsvold State School has worked with community members to rejuvenate Wakka Wakka language by introducing lessons for primary age students. Lachlan Mackenzie (teacher) and Aunty Doris (Eidsvold Wakka Wakka Group) worked in collaboration with Wakka Wakka people local to the Eidsvold area. Uncle Eric Law (OAM and Cherbourg Elder) was instrumental in introducing the Wakka Wakka language program at Cherbourg State School, where Farron Crawford is the Language and Culture Teacher. Other schools in the South Burnett Region who are implementing the Wakka Wakka language program are: St Josephs Catholic School in Murgon, Murgon State High School and Silver Linings Independent School at Ficks Crossing.

== Country ==
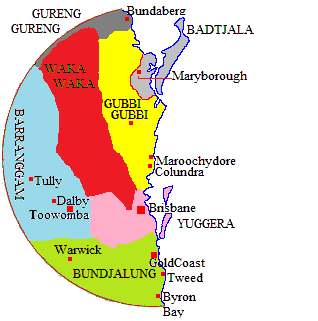
Traditional lands of Australian Aboriginal peoples around Brisbane and Sunshine Coast (Note: This map is indicative only.)

Norman Tindale estimated that Wakawaka lands extend over some 4,100 square miles (11,000 km^{2}), running northwards from Nanango to the area of Mount Perry. Their western extension was at the Boyne River, the upper Burnett River, and Mundubbera. They were also present in the areas of Kingaroy, Murgon, and Gayndah.

== Native title ==
On 12 April 2022, following 25 years of legal battle beginning in 1997, Wakka Wakka people were granted native title recognition in the form of 114,000 ha (280,000 acres) of the Burnett region. Included in the title was Ban Ban Springs, a significant spiritual and cultural site for Wakka Wakka people. Due to the extensive traditional lands occupied by Wakka Wakka people, additional native titles are expected to be recognised in the coming years.

== History of contact ==
Many Wakka Wakka and Gubbi Gubbi people – along with many other groups from across Queensland – were shifted on to the Barambah Aboriginal Mission near Murgon in the early 20th century.

This mission later became the town of Cherbourg and is now self-administered by the Cherbourg Aboriginal Shire Council.

Wakka Wakka people have many important sites located throughout their territory, including Ban Ban Springs, Barambah Creek, a sacred area near Maidenwell, and in the foothills of the Bunya Mountains. There are also a number of bora rings which have survived destruction.

In pre-colonial times, the Wakka Wakka people were one of the many groups that took part in the regular bunya nut feasts at the Bunya Mountains, and other large gatherings in other parts of the South Burnett.

== Alternative names ==
- Mungar (spotted gum tree people)
- Nukunukubara (?)
- Wa:bar (applied to several tribes)
- Waa
- Waka
- Wakaa
- Wakar, Wakkar, Wackar
- Wakkawakka
- Wakuwuka
- Wapa (Kabikabi exonym = "inlanders")
- Woga
- Wogga
- Wuka Wuka

Source: Tindale 1974, p. 187

== Sources ==
- "'In the Frame' Wayne Blair". ABC TV. 10 July 2011. Archived from the original on 1 July 2016.
- Tindale, Norman Barnett (1974). Aboriginal Tribes of Australia: Their Terrain, Environmental Controls, Distribution, Limits, and Proper Names. Australian National University Press. ISBN 978-0-708-10741-6.
- "Wakka Wakka body parts". State Library of Queensland. Archived from the original on 12 March 2017.
