= Museum of Sydney =

Australian history museum

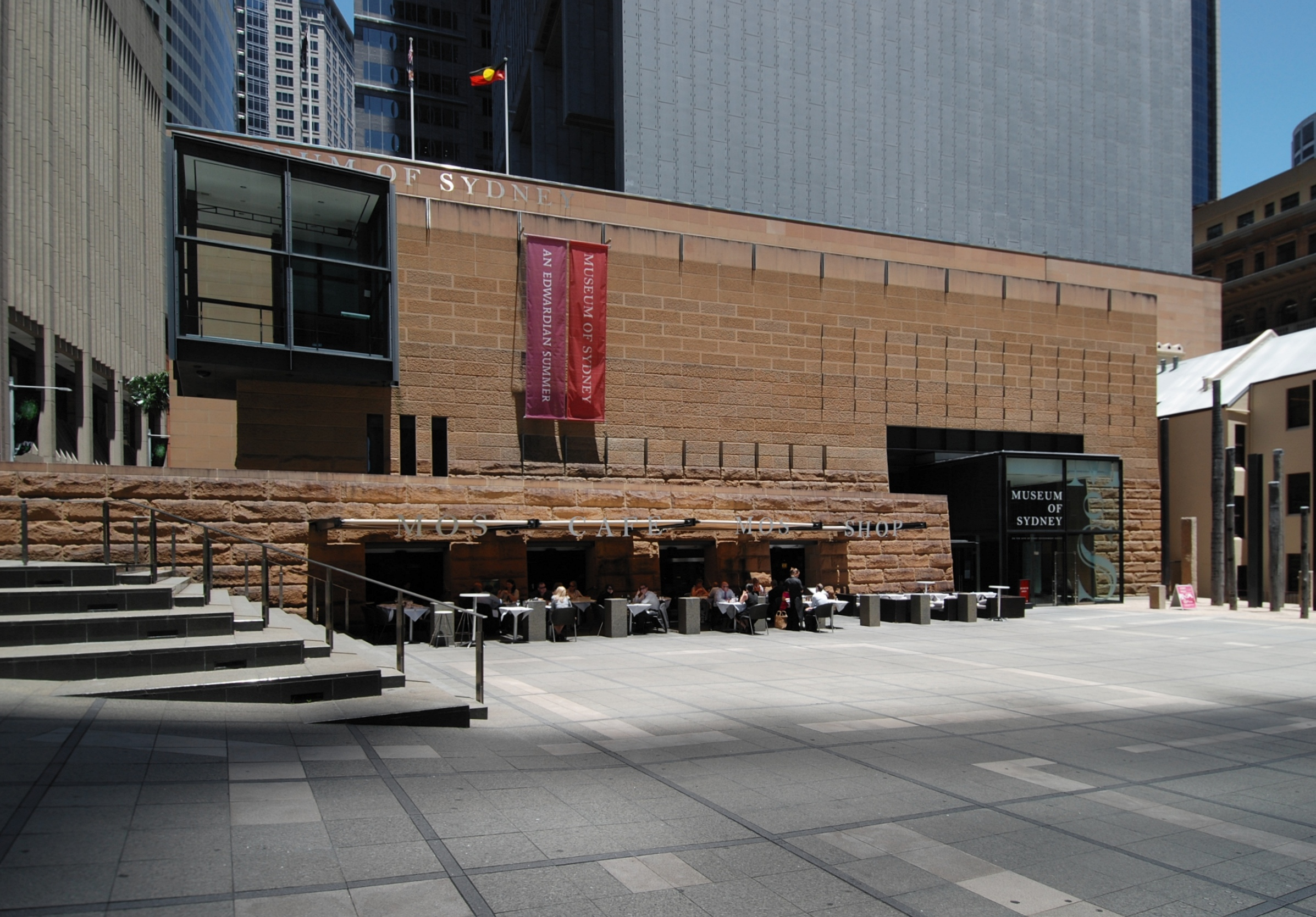
- Museum of Sydney from Bridge Street
- Established: 1995
- Location: Corner of Phillip and Bridge Street, Sydney
- Coordinates: 33°51′50″S 151°12′41″E
- Owner: Museums of History NSW
- Public transit access: Circular Quay
- Website: Museum of Sydney

The Museum of Sydney is a museum in Sydney that was built on the ruins of the house of New South Wales' first Governor, Arthur Phillip, on the present-day corner of Phillip and Bridge Street.

== Description ==
The museum is situated on the remains of the first Government House that was built in 1788, later deemed inadequate in 1832 and demolished in 1845–1846. In 1982 there were plans to develop on this site which was subject to an archaeological investigation. The first excavations took place in 1983. In October 1983 Premier Neville Wran announced that the site would be preserved and that an international competition would be held for a building that recognises the site's history. The museum and the site it is located on is managed by Museums of History NSW.

The museum building on the site was designed by Denton Corker Marshall architects.

The Museum of Sydney explores colonial and contemporary Sydney through objects, pictures, and new digital media techniques. Panoramic views of Sydney — from 1788 until today — stretch across walls and video screens. Sydney's convict era is explored in a giant showcase of goods and chattels recovered from more than 25 archaeological digs.

== Origins of the name ==
When it was commissioned, the project was called the First Government House Museum. While the museum building was under construction in November 1993, the New South Wales Minister for the Arts announced that the museum would be known as the Museum of Sydney on the Site of First Government House, described in the press at the time as a "mouthful" and commonly contracted to The Museum of Sydney. The change of name attracted protests.

== Forecourt ==
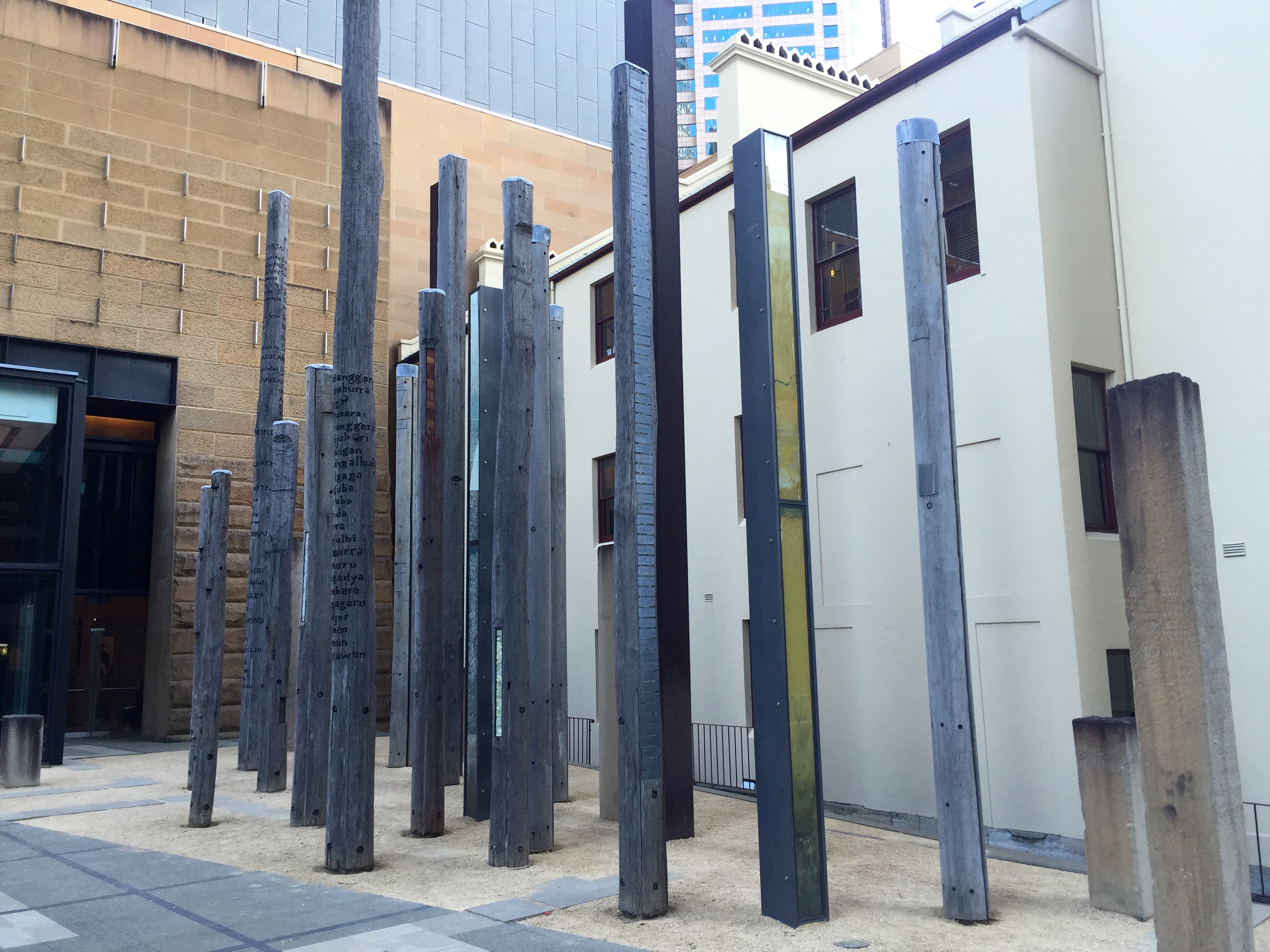
Edge of the Trees, artwork in the museum forecourt, installed in 1995.

The public entrance to the museum is via First Government House Place in Bridge Street, Sydney. The outline of Phillip's residence, the first Government House, is marked out on the plaza with inlaid stone. Excavation of the site revealed examples of covered drains dated to the late 1790s and brick barrel drains dated to circa 1811 and another to circa 1828. The remains of the drains and privies are shown in their original context, along with other archeological artifacts, in glass display cases built into the pavement of the forecourt.

== See also ==
- Culture of Sydney
- History of Sydney
