= Ngulungbara =

Aboriginal Australian people of K'Gari (formerly Fraser Island), Queensland

The Ngulungbara were an Aboriginal Australian people or clan of K'gari (formerly known as Fraser Island) in the state of Queensland, possibly of the Butchulla people.

== Country ==
The Ngulingbara's status as an independent tribe has been contested, since some authorities consider them to have been a horde of the Butchulla, since the -bara suffix in their ethnonym is suggestive of a clan grouping. They occupied a sector of the island of K'gari north of Boomerang Hill and, in Norman Tindale's estimate, inhabited an area of some 200 square miles (520 km^{2}).

== Alternative names ==
- Olongbura
- Gnoolongbara
- Koolaburra

== Sources ==
- Howitt, Alfred William (1904). The native tribes of south-east Australia (PDF). Macmillan.
- Shirley, John (1897). "Vocabularies of the Gowrburra and Koolaburra tribes". Proceedings of the Royal Society of Queensland. 12: 1–9. doi:10.5962/p.351255. S2CID 257138185.
- Tindale, Norman Barnett (1974). "Ngulungbara (QLD)". Aboriginal Tribes of Australia: Their Terrain, Environmental Controls, Distribution, Limits, and Proper Names. Australian National University Press.
