= Janet Laurence =

Australian artist (born 1947)

Janet Laurence (born 4 March 1947) is an Australian artist, based in Sydney, who works in photography, sculpture, video and installation art. Her work is an expression of her concern about environment and ethics, her "ecological quest" as she produces art that allows the viewer to immerse themselves to strive for a deeper connection with the natural world. Her work has been included in major survey exhibitions, nationally and internationally and is regularly exhibited in Australia, Japan, Germany, Hong Kong and the UK. She has exhibited in galleries and outside in site-specific projects, often involving collaborations with architects, landscape architects and environmental scientists. Her work is held in all major Australian galleries as well as private collections in Australia and overseas.

== Biography ==
Laurence was born in 1947 in Sydney, Australia, where she continues to live and work.

1977 – 1979 Laurence studied in Sydney and Italy.

1979-1981 Laurence lived in New York City to pursue graduate studies. She was influenced by a Joseph Beuys exhibition at the Guggenheim Museum, and discovered the Earth or Land artists. She was particularly struck by Alan Sonfist's permanent installation Time Landscape (1965–) a garden presented as a work of art.

1981 Laurence had a three-month residency at Bennington College in the woods of Vermont. While there she was influenced by the movement to consider and view art outside the traditional gallery walls.

1982 She returned to Sydney and continued studying at the City Art Institute, part of the University of New South Wales.

1983 She completed a Graduate Diploma in Professional Art Studies at the University of New South Wales.

1994 Laurence completed a Master of Fine Arts at the University of New South Wales.

Laurence has been a recipient of an Australia Council Fellowship (1996 – 98) and Churchill Fellowship (2006).

1995-2005 She was a trustee of the Art Gallery of New South Wales

2007 Laurence was the subject of John Beard's winning entry for the Archibald Prize sponsored by the Art Gallery of New South Wales. The portrait features Laurence in a moment of reflection, captured in black and white, but textured with light and shade. The pair are close friends and the collaboration lends itself to a sense of double portraiture with the artist-as-subject.

2007-2009 She served on the Visual Arts Board of the Australia Council

Since 2008 Laurence has been a visiting fellow at the College of Fine Arts, University of New South Wales

She is also a council member of Voiceless, the animal protection institute.

== Work ==
Lawrence has made small works, but increasingly she has focused on large, outside works that are described as immersive, and use such natural materials as minerals and oxides, living plant matter, corals, taxidermy birds, and more.

She is cited as stating that the acceptance of installation art in Australia began in 1991 when she was commissioned to create the Tomb of the Unknown Soldier in the Canberra War Memorial. The work, created in conjunction with the architectural firm Tonkin Zulaikha, consists of four pillars of different materials that soar upward in the hall of memories.

Her focus on science began in 1990 when she began to use metascience to better understand the ideas about transient and transformative nature.

In the early 2000s her work became increasingly political as well as poetic, as she intentionally began to focus on the triangle of artist, artwork and viewer. The viewer increasing became part of the artwork as they could look through and walk through installations.

Major commissioned works include:

Australian War Memorial, London (in collaboration with TZG Architects)

Tarkine for a World in Need of Wilderness Macquarie Bank London. The Tarkine is a wilderness area in Tasmania, Australia that is a World Heritage Site.

In the Shadow, Sydney 2000 Olympic Park, an installation along a creek of various rods to symbolize water testing. On her own website, Janet explains:

The work aims to reveal the transforming chemistry of water remediation by creating a poetic alchemical zone as a metaphor for the actual transformation of Homebush Bay from its degraded contaminated industrial past into a green and living site for the future. The installation is designed to be informative with regard to the environmental history of the site, but also to be a quiet place, a place of contemplation.

Waterveil, CH2 Building for Melbourne City Council. The work is made up of tall vertical panels of glass, some of which are screen printed with images of glass vessels, some slightly coloured to look like fluid running through them. They are on outside windows of the building foyer, and so can be seen both outside and inside.

Elixir, Echigo-Tsumari Art Triennial, Japan; This is a wooden traditional Japanese house that incorporates a glass panel screen printed with poured paint. as well as plant and fluids, blown-glass vials, plant extracts steeped in shochu, and laboratory glass. It is a permanent installation.

Memory of Lived Spaces, T3 Terminal Changi Singapore. This work blends architecture with nature. Photographic panels are overlaid with painted sheets of glass.

Laurence was the Australian representative to the United Nations' Convention on Climate Change in late 2015. Her work, Deep Breathing Resuscitation for the Reef (Australia Museum) focused on the fragility of the Great Barrier Reef—a World Heritage Site—because of climate change. The critically acclaimed installation used pigment as well as acrylic boxes and laboratory glass to enclose wet specimens and coral.

On her view of works on site, she has said:

The offering of nature is so important because when an artist creates it, there is more significance than when a landscape company does it. It draws your attention to it, and the work becomes much more than merely a landscape.

On being a woman artist, she has said,

I didn't want to just be a painter on canvas; I wanted to think about the enmeshed space that a woman might create compared to a man. There were a lot of things like that I would compare and think about. I was also interested in the writings of Luce Irigaray and the idea of the inside and outside spaces bleeding, the idea of the no boundary. I found many principles and philosophies to hold on to as a woman artist, without having to didactically paint it as so many women were in those days. I didn't have to paint a lipstick!

== Collections ==
Laurence's works are held in a number of collections including:

- Art Gallery of New South Wales, Sydney;
- Australian War Memorial, Canberra;
- Museum Kunstwerk, Eberdingen, Germany;
- Museum of Contemporary Art Australia,
- National Gallery of Australia, Canberra;
- National Gallery of Victoria, Melbourne;
- Queensland Art Gallery | Gallery of Modern Art, Brisbane;
- Seibu Collection, Tokyo;
- World Bank Collection, Washington DC;
- University of New South Wales, Sydney;
- University of Western Australia, Perth.

== Exhibitions (solo and group) ==
- 1981: First solo exhibition: Notes from the Shore, Central Street Gallery, Sydney.
- 1992: Synthesis, Bond Stores, Sydney, an exhibition about artists and architects working together.
- 2000: Muses: Janet Laurence, Artist in the Museum, Ian Potter Museum, National Gallery of Victoria
- 2010: Abundant Australia: 11th Venice Architecture Biennale, Australian Pavilion, Venice, Italy
- 2010: Handle With Care: 2008 Adelaide Biennial of Australian Art, Art Gallery of South Australia
- 2010: Waiting, 17th Biennale of Sydney: The Beauty of Distance – Songs of Survival in a Precarious Age, Royal Botanic Garden, Sydney
- 2010: In the Balance: Art for a Changing World, Museum of Contemporary Art, Sydney
- 2012: In Memory of Nature, Art Gallery of New South Wales, Sydney,
- 2012: After Eden, Sherman Contemporary Art Foundation, Sydney
- 2012: Negotiating this World, NGV, Melbourne
- 2013: SCANZ: 3rd Nature, New Plymouth, New Zealand
- 2013: 1/2 Scene, Australia China Art Foundation (ACAF), Melbourne, VIC
- 2013: Animate/Inanimate, TarraWarra Museum of Art, Healsville, VIC
- 2014: The Skullbone Experiment: A Paradigm of Art and Nature, Launceston Museum, Tasmania, Australia
- 2014: What Marcel Duchamp Taught Me, FAS Contemporary, London
- 2014: Blood and Chlorophyll, Lake Macquarie City Art Gallery, Australia
- 2015: Till its Gone, Islanbul Modern, Turkey
- 2015: Deep Breathing 2015 Artists 4 Paris Muséum National D'Historie Naturelle, Paris
- 2016: Deep Breathing (Resuscitation for the Reef) Australian Museum
- 2016: Anthropocene, Fine Arts Society Contemporary, London, UK
- 2016: H2O Waterbar, Paddington Reservoir Gardens NSW
- 2017: Nautilus State Museum for Art and Cultural History, Oldenburger Schloss, Germany
- 2017: Moving Plants Rønnebæksholm, Denmark
- 2017: Inside the Flower, Internationale Garten Ausstellung (IGA), Berlin, Germany
- 2019: After Nature, Museum of Contemporary Art Australia (MCA), Sydney, Australia

== Permanent site-specific works ==
- 2003: Elixir, Echigo-Tsumari Triennial, Japan, permanent installation
- 2003: The Breath We Share, Sidney Myer Bendigo Art Gallery, Vic
- 2006: Waterveil, CH2 Building for Melbourne City Council, Melbourne
- 2007: The Memory of Lived Spaces, Changi T3 Airport Terminal, Singapore
- 2010: Ghost, Lake Macquarie Gallery, NSW
- 2011: Tarkine (For a World in Need of Wilderness), Macquarie Bank, London, UK
- 2015: Veiling Glass Medicine Maze, Novartis Sydney NSW

== Awards and grants ==
- 1995: Royal Australian Institute of Architects 'Lloyd Rees Award for Urban Design' for First Government House Place, Sydney, in collaboration with Fiona Foley and Denton Corker Marshall Architects
- 1996: Alice Prize, Alice Springs, NT
- 1997 Rockefeller Fellowship
- 1996 - 98 Australia Council Fellowship (1996 – 98)
- 2006: Churchill Fellowship
