= Lake Boomanjin =

Lake in Queensland, Australia

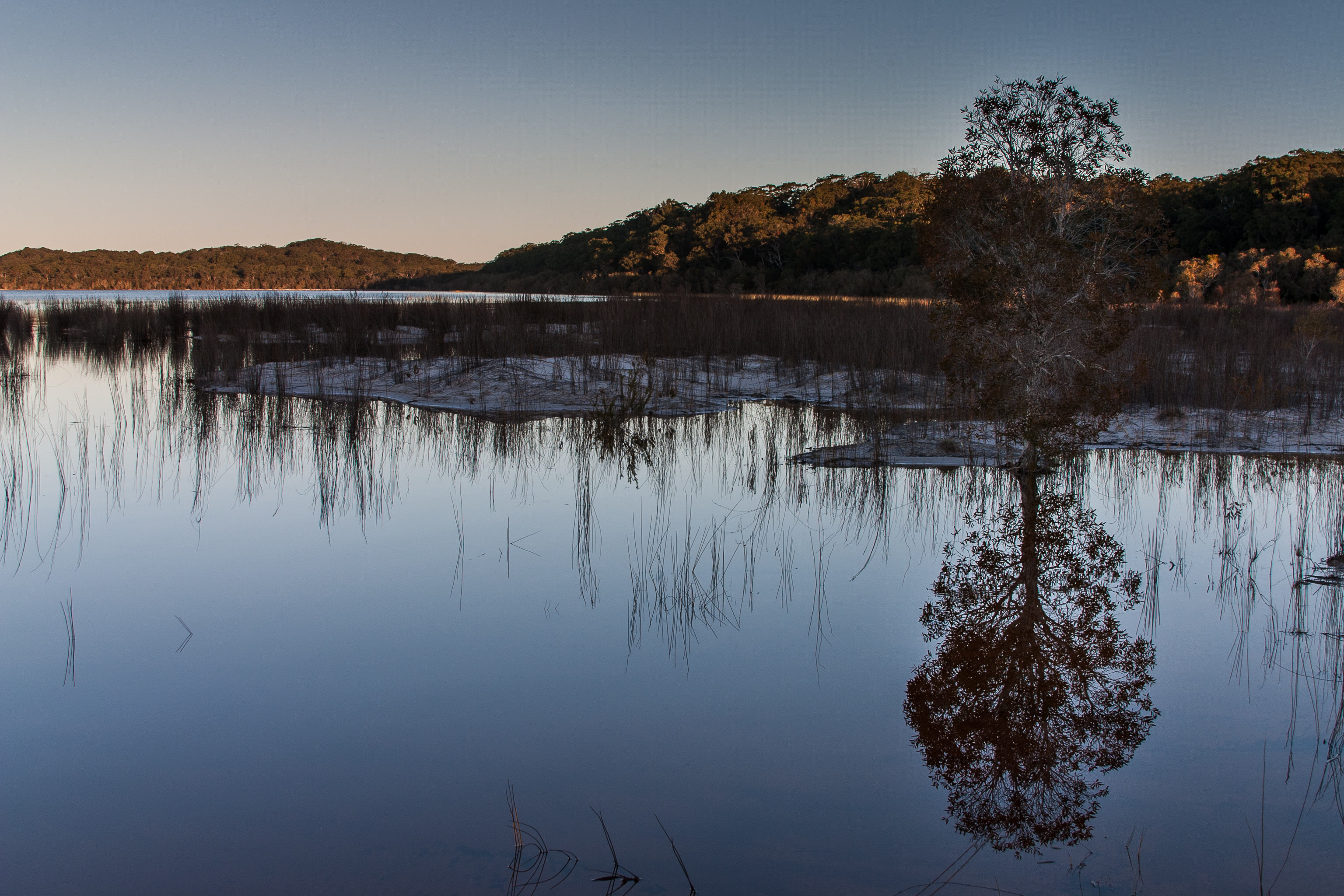
- Lake Boomanjin in the Fraser Coast Region of Queensland, Australia.

- Location within Queensland
- Location: K'gari
- Coordinates: 25°33′18″S 153°04′30″E
- Type: Perched
- Primary inflows: Three small creeks
- Basin countries: Australia
- Surface area: 2 km^{2} (0.77 sq mi)
- Average depth: 5 m (16 ft)
- Settlements: Eurong, Queensland

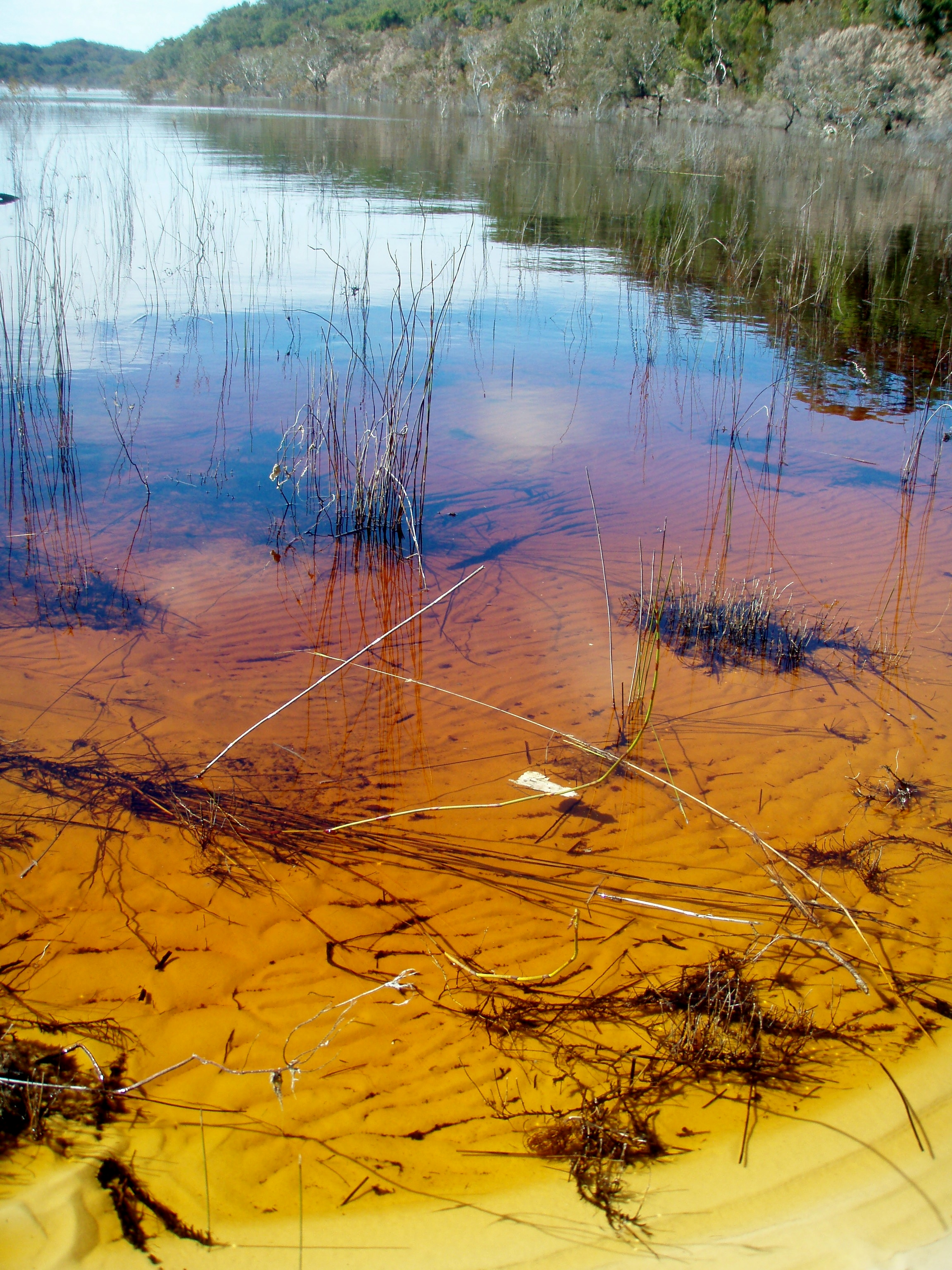
Shallow waters on the shore of Lake Boomanjin, showing the water’s reddish hue from tannins.

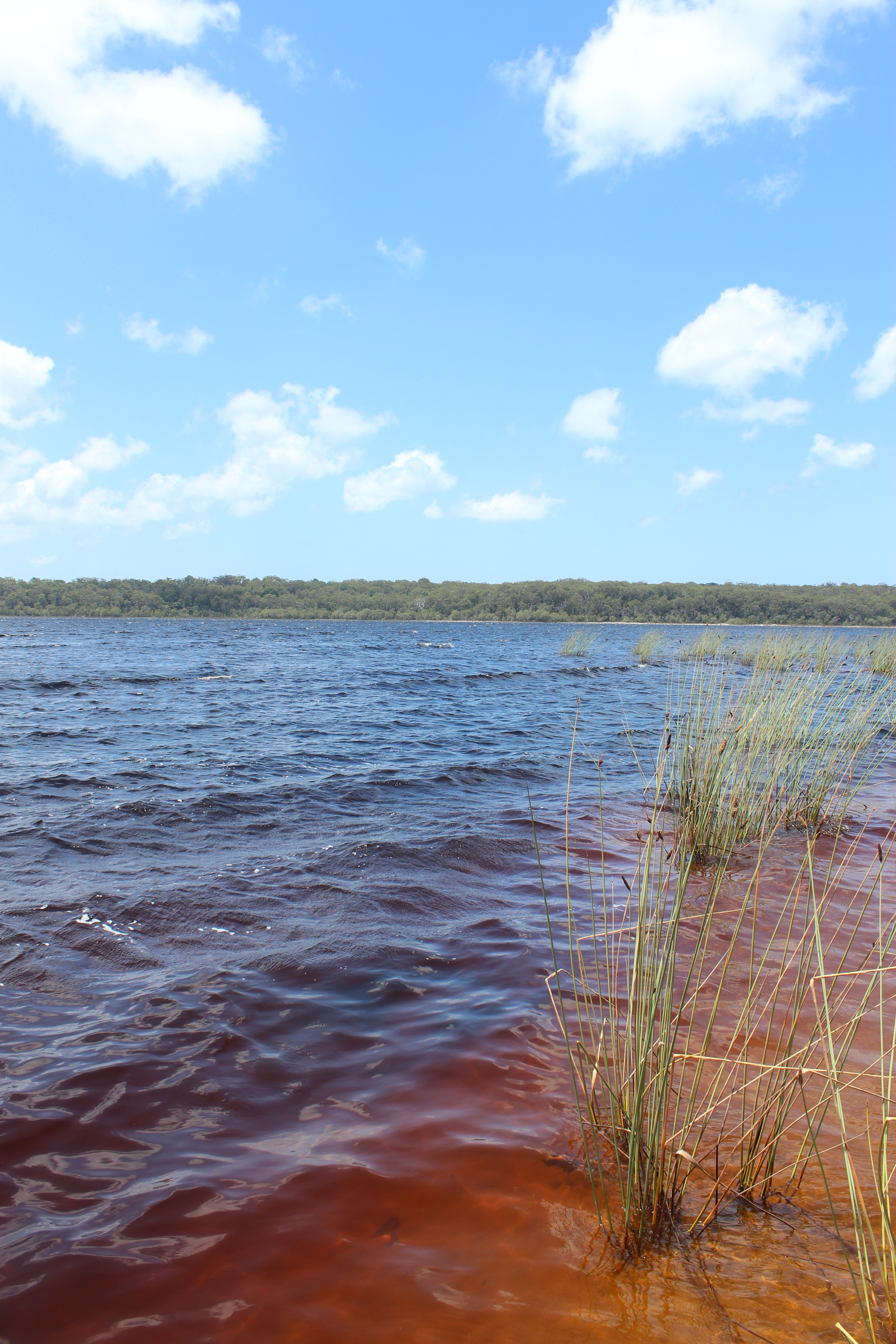
The tannin-coloured water of Lake Boomanjin, K'gari (Fraser Island)

Lake Boomanjin is a large perched lake in the Fraser Coast Region of Queensland, Australia. The lake is located on K'gari (formerly Fraser Island) in the Great Sandy National Park.

Lake Boomanjin is considered the largest perched lake in the world, meaning that the lake floor is above the water table. It is one of 40 perched lakes on K'gari, all of which make up half of the known perched lakes in the world.

The lake is known for its reddish brown color, which is caused by colored dissolved organic matter including tannins from tea trees growing in its watershed. Its inflow comes from two small creeks that pass through wallum swamp, providing the sources of the dissolved matter that creates the unique color. Lake Boomanjin’s floor is covered in white quartz-rich sands. Carnivorous plants, bladderworts, can be found near the lake.

Compared to nearby lakes with clearer water, Lake Boomanjin gets less attention from tourism overall. There is a campsite on Lake Boomanjin managed as part of the K’gari Recreation Area within Great Sandy National Park.

== See also ==
- Brown Lake (Stradbroke Island)
- Lake McKenzie
- Lake Wabby
- List of lakes of Australia
