= Fraser Commando School =

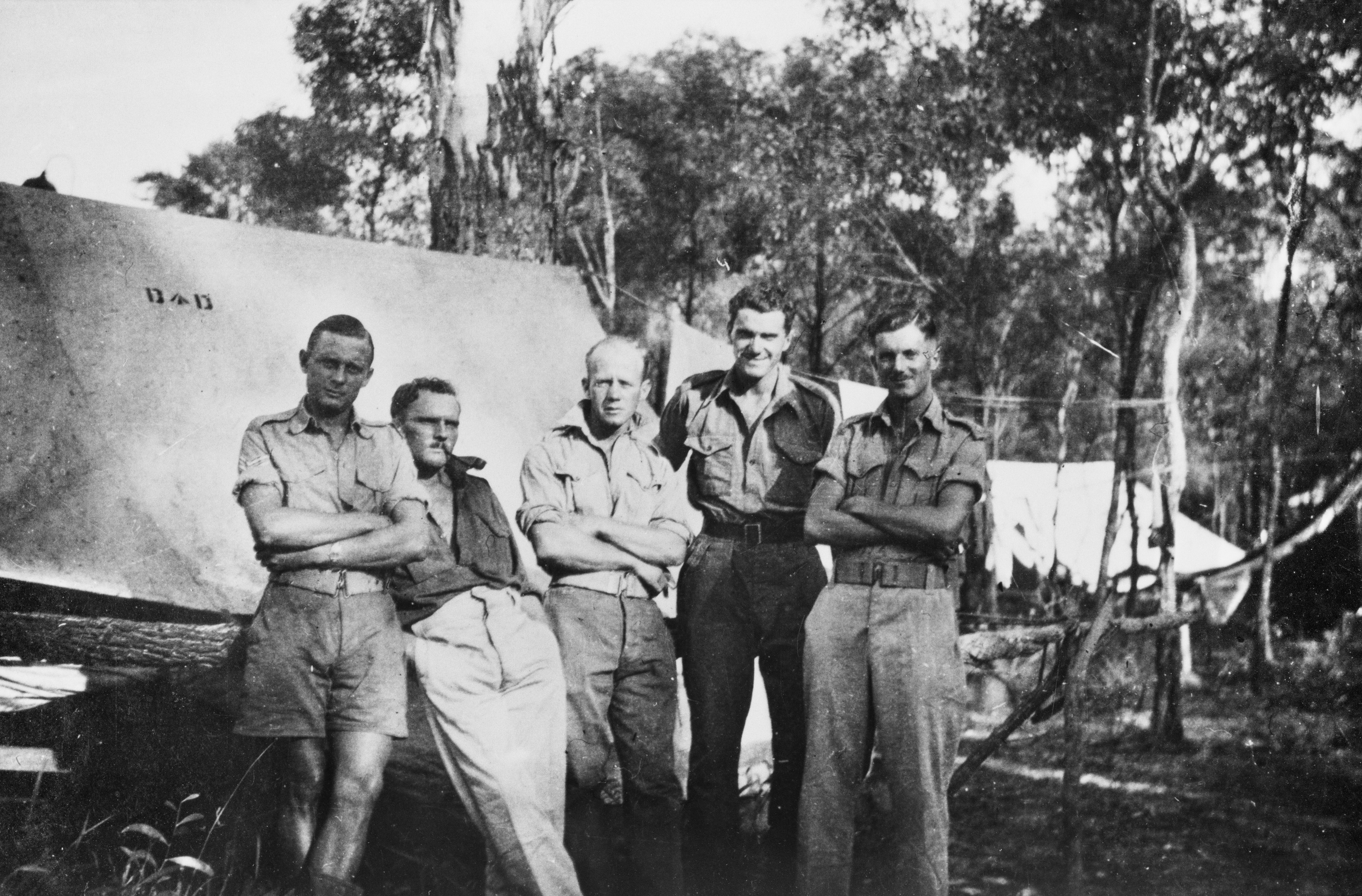
Z Special Unit volunteers on Fraser Island. December 1943.

The Fraser Commando School (FCS) was the main Services Reconnaissance Department training facility after training operations were transferred from the Z Experimental Station in October 1943.

The FCS was located on Fraser Island in Southeast Queensland, near to the McKenzies Jetty, 1.6 km south of what is now the Kingfisher Bay Resort. The site was selected due to its seclusion and sparse habitation. At the time of the establishment of the FCS, Fraser Island was virtually uninhabited apart from a small Forestry establishment at Central Station and a Royal Australian Air Force Radar Station at Sandy Cape, on the northern tip of the island. Fraser Island also has rainforest areas which were utilised for jungle warfare training and a series of freshwater lakes. The largest of these, Lake McKenzie, was used for parachute water jump training by night and day.

The FCS was used by over 900 army personnel and was preparing soldiers for their deadly missions behind the Japanese front lines in the jungles of south-east Asia. The soldiers were trained to lay explosives underneath several enemy canoes, eventually blowing up the Japanese forces.

FCS was the basic Special Operations training facility for the Services Reconnaissance Department, Far Eastern Liaison Office and also hosted students from the Philippines Regional Section. Students received instruction in weapons, demolitions, advanced parachuting, water operations using folboats and rubber boats, as well as extensive signals, physical fitness, ships and plane recognition, and unarmed combat training.

Major H.A. Campbell, one of the architects of Operation Jaywick was in command of the FCS until January 1944, when he was succeeded by Lt. Davidson RNVR, Major L. McGuinn and later, Major S.R. Leach.

Operations at the FCS ceased in December 1945 and the training camp was shut down in early 1946. Later in the 1960s builders and woodworkers used the site to construct building. The reminisce about the training camp is spare and the debris of concrete slabs and pipes are prohibited to touch for tourist.
