= Fairfield (1825 ship) =

History

United Kingdom
- Builder: Nicol Reid, Aberdeen
- Launched: 19 March 1825
- Fate: Last listed in 1839

General characteristics
- Tons burthen: 24879/94, or 249 (bm)
- Length: 90 ft 4 in (27.5 m)
- Beam: 25 ft 3 in (7.7 m)
- Sail plan: Snow

Fairfield was launched in Aberdeen in 1825 and sailed to Australia and the West Indies. She was last listed in 1839.

== Career ==
Fairfield first entered Lloyd's Register (LR) in 1825.

Year	Master	Owner	Trade
1826	James Wark	John Lumsden	London–New South Wales
1827	James Wark; John Morrice	John Lumsden	London–Van Dieman's Land
1828	John Morrice; James Booth	John Lumsden	Liverpool-St Thomas
1829	P.Booth	John Lumsden	Liverpool-New South Wales

Comet sailed from Sydney on 12 April 1829, bound for Batavia. she reached the Torres Straits on 5 May, and the next day wrecked on a reef. The crew survived on her quarterdeck for three days before they were able to launch her boats. They then sailed to Murray Island, where they found Fairfield, Both, master, which rescued them.

Year	Master	Owner	Trade
1831	P.Booth; Norie	John Lumsden	Liverpool-New South Wales
1833	James Norie	John Lumsden	Liverpool-New South Wales
1834	F Glendenning	Glendenning	London–Jamaica

In 1834 a new owner changed Fairfield's registry to London. He also sailed her as a West Indiaman.

Year	Master	Owner	Trade
1839	Beard	Glendenning	London–Jamaica
