= Comet (1826 ship) =

History

United Kingdom
- Owner: Muir & Co.
- Builder: Portland, New Brunswick
- Launched: 1826
- Fate: Wrecked 6 May 1829

General characteristics
- Tons burthen: 309, or 314 (bm)

Comet was launched in New Brunswick in 1826. She was wrecked on 6 May 1829 in the Torres Strait, north of present-day Queensland, Australia. Her crew survived.

Year	Master	Owner	Trade	Source
1827	J.Morrison; J.Fraser	Muir & Co.	Greenock–New Brunswick	LR
1829	J.Fraser	Muir & Co.	Greenock–Van Diemen's Land	LR

Loss: Comet sailed from Sydney on 12 April 1829, bound for Batavia. She reached the Torres Straits on 5 May, and the next day wrecked on Boot Reef (10.2°S 144.6°E). The crew survived on her quarterdeck for three days before they were able to launch her boats. They then sailed to Murray Island, where they found Fairfield, of Aberdeen, Both, master, which rescued them.

== Post script ==
Seven years later Captain Fraser would wreck Stirling Castle on Eliza Reef (near present-day Rockhampton, Queensland), on passage from Sydney for Singapore and Manila.
