= K'gari =

Sand island in Fraser Coast Region, Queensland, Australia

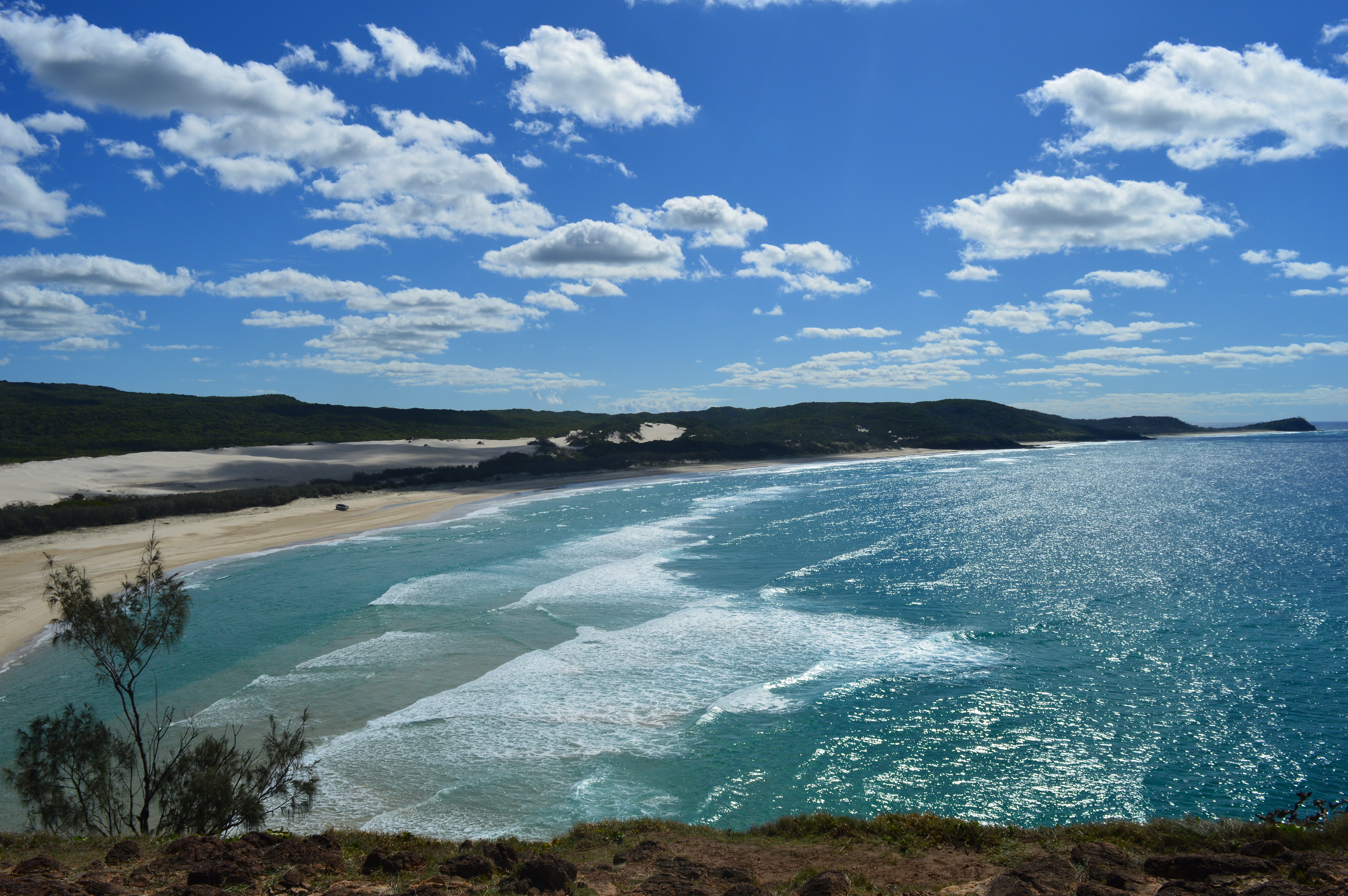
- The beach from Indian Head, May 2016

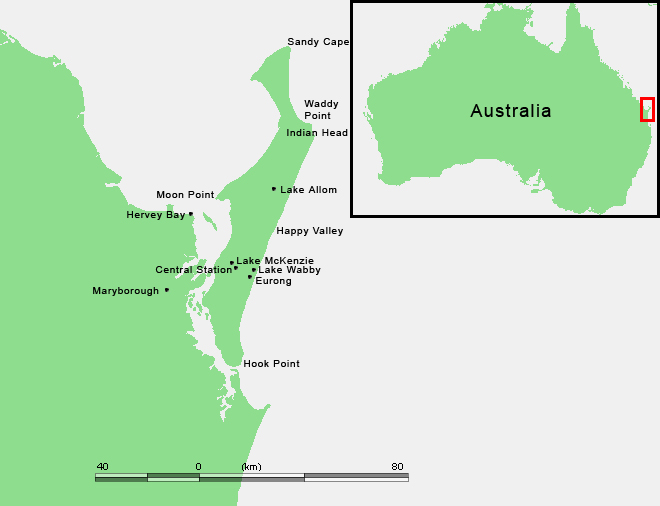
- Map of K'gari, including its location in Australia

- Location of K'gari K'gari (Australia)
- Etymology: Paradise in Butchulla

Geography
- Location: Fraser Coast, Queensland
- Coordinates: 25.24°S 153.15°E
- Adjacent to: Great Sandy Strait, Coral Sea
- Area: 1,655 km^{2} (639 sq mi)
- Length: 123 km (76.4 mi)
- Width: 22 km (13.7 mi)

Administration
- Australia
- State: Queensland
- Region: Wide Bay–Burnett
- Local Government Area: Fraser Coast
- Largest settlements: K'gari, Eurong

Demographics
- Population: 152 (2021 census)
- Languages: Australian English, Butchulla

Additional information
- Time zone: AEST (UTC+10:00)

UNESCO World Heritage Site
- Criteria: Natural: (vii), (viii), (ix)
- Reference: 630
- Inscription: 1992 (16th Session)

K'gari (Batjala for 'Paradise', English: /ˈɡɑːri/ GAH-ree), also known by its former name Fraser Island, is a World Heritage-listed sand island along the south-eastern coast in the Wide Bay–Burnett region of Queensland, Australia. The island lies approximately 250 km (160 mi) north of the state capital, Brisbane, and is within the Fraser Coast Region local council area. The world heritage listing includes the island, its surrounding waters and parts of the nearby mainland which make up the Great Sandy National Park. In the 2021 census, the island had a population of 152. Up to 500,000 people visit the island each year.

The island is part of the traditional lands of the Butchulla people, under the traditional name of "K'gari". European settlers who arrived in 1847 named the island "Fraser Island" after Captain James Fraser, master of Stirling Castle, who was shipwrecked and died on the island in early August 1836. On 7 June 2023, the island was officially renamed K'gari by the state government.

== History ==
=== Traditional owners ===
The lands that include the current day island have been inhabited from between 5,000 and 50,000 years ago by the Butchulla people. Originally attached to the mainland, K'Gari became an island 10,000–20,000 years ago due to rising seas.

The K'gari creation story, as told by Butchulla elder Olga Miller, is that Yendingie (also Yindingie) came down from the sky and set to work to make the sea and then the land until, when he arrived at the area now known as Hervey Bay, he was joined by a helper — a beautiful white spirit called Princess K'gari. K'gari fell in love with the beautiful land they had created and begged to be allowed to stay rather than returning to heaven. Yendingie changed her into a beautiful island, then:

So she wouldn't be lonely, he then made some beautiful trees and flowers, and some lakes that were specially mirrored so that she could see into the sky. He made creeks and laughing waters that would become her voice, and birds and animals and people to keep her company. He gave these people knowledge and laws, and told them what to do, and how to procreate, so that their children and ancestors would always be there to keep K'gari company.

— Olga Miller, K'gari creation story

Butchulla (also known as Batjala, Badtjala, Badjela and Badjala) is the language of the Fraser Coast region, including the island. Butchulla language region includes the landscape within the local government boundaries of the Fraser Coast Regional Council, particularly the towns of Maryborough and Hervey Bay extending south towards Noosa.

Archaeological research and evidence shows that Aboriginal Australians occupied K'gari at least 5,000 years ago. There was a permanent population of 400–600 that grew to 2,000–3,000 in the winter months due to abundant seafood resources. Conflict with European settlers and disease reduced the population from 435 in 1872 to 230 in 1880. Most of these people were taken off the island in 1904 and relocated to missions in Yarrabah and Durundur (near Caboolture).

It is estimated that up to 500 indigenous archaeological sites are located on the island.

=== British exploration (1770–1840s) ===
Initial European contact was limited to explorers and shipwrecks. The first recorded Briton to sight K'gari was James Cook, who passed along the coast of the island between 18 and 20 May 1770. He named it Indian Head after viewing a number of Aboriginal people gathered on the headland. After Cook's passage an Aboriginal song was composed to commemorate the event. This was later recognised as the first preserved oral testimony of Indigenous observation of Europeans. Matthew Flinders sailed past the island in 1799, and again in 1802, this time landing at Sandy Cape, while charting Hervey Bay. His 1814 chart is a combination of both voyages, but did not confirm K'gari as being separate from the mainland. However, Flinders did suggest the presence of shallow swampy areas at the lower part of the bay. Flinders was told of an opening at Hook Point, between K'gari and the mainland, by two American whalers who were hunting in Hervey Bay. In 1842, Andrew Petrie recorded good pastoral lands and forests, attracting graziers to the region. Lieutenant Robert Dayman was the first European to sail between K'gari and the mainland in 1847.

==== Shipwreck; Eliza Fraser (1836) ====
Captain James Fraser and his wife, Eliza Fraser, of England, were shipwrecked on the island in 1836. Their ship, the brig Stirling Castle, set sail from Sydney to Singapore with 18 crew and passengers. The ship was holed on coral while travelling through the Great Barrier Reef north of the island. Transferring to two lifeboats, the crew set a course south, attempting to reach the settlement at Moreton Bay (now Brisbane). During this trip in the leaking lifeboats, Eliza Fraser was pregnant; giving birth in water up to her waist; the infant drowned after birth. The Captain's lifeboat began sinking and was soon left behind by the second one, which continued on. The wrecked boat and its crew was beached on what was then known as the Great Sandy Island.

Captain Fraser died, leaving his wife Eliza and the second mate Mr Baxter living among the local peoples. Eliza and Baxter were found six weeks later by a convict, John Graham, who had lived in the bush as an escapee and who spoke the Aboriginal language. He was sent from the settlement at Moreton Bay by the authorities there who had heard about their plight, and negotiated their return.

=== Frontier conflict (1851–1860) ===
Non-Indigenous settlement of the traditional Butchulla mainland area began in 1847, sparking frontier conflict. Violence between Indigenous people and non-Indigenous people was reported. In October 1850, it was reported "blacks had driven away 2000 sheep from a station about forty miles from here, and had killed a shepherd". In 1851, a small government-led force including Commandant Frederick Walker and a contingent of the Native Police were called in "for the purpose of endeavouring to apprehend some aboriginal natives who stand charged with various offences, and who have hitherto found shelter in the scrub" of 'Fraser's Island'. Frontier war was anticipated, condoned, and facilitated by the government, with Walker receiving advice from the Attorney-General of New South Wales, John Hubert Plunkett saying, "It must, unhappily, be expected that the proposed attempt at arrest may lead to a warlike conflict and perhaps to loss of life, but the aim of the law must not be paralysed by the expectation of such results".

The force included Walker, Lieutenant Richard Marshall, Sergeant Doolan, three divisions of troopers, and armed locals including James Leith Hay, aboard a schooner. A boat reputedly stolen by "the blacks from Maryborough" was captured along the way. The force landed on the west coast of the island where the divisions split up. During the night, conflict began and a number of Indigenous people were shot and others captured. The weather was bad and Commandant Walker allowed his division to track down other groups without him. This group tracked a group of Indigenous people across the island to the east coast where they pursued them into the open ocean near Indian Head/Tacky Waroo to an unknown fate. After months of conflict, the force returned to Maryborough in early January 1852 and Captain Currie received a reward of £10 for his contribution. According to Native Police reports, operations on Fraser's Island during 24 December 1851 and 3 January 1852 were lawful, and only two Indigenous people were killed while attacking Walker's police party on the night of 27 December 1851. Academics as well as community advocates have demonstrated that the word dispersed was often used regardless of the actual results of clashes between Native Police and Indigenous Australians and the pursuing of Indigenous people into the sea at Indian Head/Tacky Waroo was most likely a massacre as the relevant report states that the Butchulla were "dispersed into the sea".

British commissioners stationed in Maryborough reported non-Indigenous occupants felt threatened by Butchulla people. In 1857, a Native Police barracks under the command of Lieutenant John O'Connell Bligh was established at Coopers Plains, now Owanyilla, not far from Maryborough. Bligh conducted further forays into Fraser's Island, Cooloola, and in the town of Maryborough itself.

=== The white girls (1859) ===
In 1859 rumours of two shipwrecked white girls living with Butchulla people on Fraser Island gained some credence when Captain Arnold of Coquette arrived in Sydney with information seeming to confirm the story. Public interest was stirred and Arnold was requested by the government of the Colony of New South Wales to return to the island with a rescue party, obtaining the right to a £200 bonus if the girls were brought back. The expedition was carried out with the aid of an Aboriginal man named Tommy, who identified the Aboriginal camp near Indian Head where two girls aged about 12 and 18 were located and captured. On taking them to Sydney, it became evident through their appearance and through their complete lack of knowledge of the English language that the girls were likely Aboriginal "half-castes". Edward Preddy of the rescue party wrote that "they could not converse with any of us, nor did they seem capable of talking with the blacks." Arthur Macalister stated that he "thought it very probable that these girls were half castes, and that the whole thing was a trick". Further discredit was placed on the process when it was found that the Aboriginal people who were paid by the search party to find the girls were rewarded in worthless commemorative coins instead of real money. The girls, "Kitty" Mundi and "Maria" Quoheen/Coyeen, were not returned to their home but were initially kept at the Immigration Depot, where they yearned for their family. Kitty, the eldest of the two, suffered severe mental distress and died shortly afterwards. Maria survived for about 20 years, dying from pulmonary tuberculosis.

=== Aboriginal internment camp (1897–1904) ===
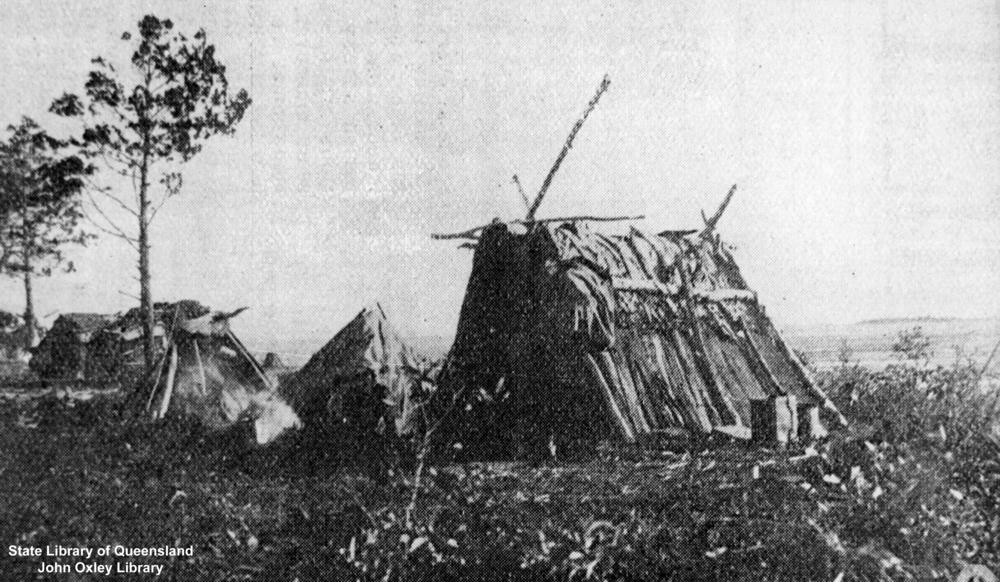
Shelters at Boggimbah, Fraser Island, 1902. John Oxley Library, State Library of Queensland. Negative number: 107735.

In 1897, as part of the implementation of the Aboriginals Protection and Restriction of the Sale of Opium Act 1897, the Government of Queensland moved 51 Indigenous people who had been deemed to have "reached a deplorable stage of degradation, being completely demoralised by drink, opium, disease, and intermittent periods of semi-starvation" from the Maryborough district to a camp on the west coast of Fraser Island. The main bureaucrat in charge of the relocations of Indigenous people in Queensland at the time, Archibald Meston, transported the 51 men, women and children to a defunct quarantine station at White Cliffs (Beerillbee) about 2 km south of the present day Kingfisher Bay Resort. However, white residents of Maryborough made incursions into the camp area and caused tension and flare ups which resulted in the relocation of the camp 10 km north to Bogimbah creek. The Queensland Government ran the Bogimbah site under the direction of Archibald Meston's son and wife until February 1900, when control was handed over to the Australian Board of Missions. By this time, Bogimbah had become an incarceration facility for Indigenous people from around Queensland. It was described as a hell hole of deprivation, lacking medical supplies, food and shelter and mosquito born diseases were prevalent. At the end of 1899 there were 137 Indigenous people from 25 different locations, including some who had served prison sentences in places like St Helena Island and Townsville Gaol and had been refused permission to return to their homes. A former Native Police trooper named Barney, who had assisted in the operations to capture Ned Kelly, was sent to Bogimbah but drowned there not long after in a boating accident.

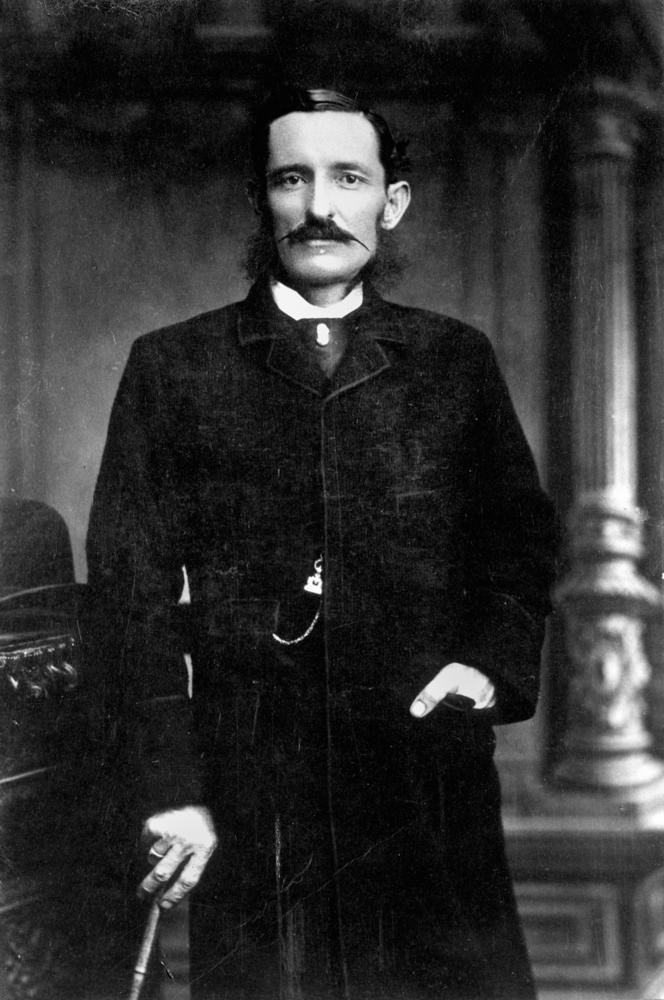
Archibald Meston. John Oxley Library, State Library of Queensland. Negative Number 17065.

Conditions at Bogimbah were dire, with inadequate shelter and rations. Inmates frequently tried to escape to the mainland in order to get access to better food and obtain employment. Some died through malnutrition, pulmonary tuberculosis and geophagia. In 1904, in order to save money on funding to the Missions Board, the Queensland Government decided to shut the Bogimbah facility. Of the 145 Indigenous people counted at the time of closure, 94 were transferred to the Yarrabah facility near Cairns, 33 to the Durundur facility near Woodford, 9 were kept local and another 9 escaped or were sent elsewhere. Those who were removed to Yarrabah were transported by the Rio Loge and there appears to have been deceptive techniques involved in getting the people to separate from loved ones. Once in Yarrabah, similarly poor living standards greeted these people and those who become troublesome were transferred to Fitzroy Island.

=== Wreck of Maheno (1935) ===
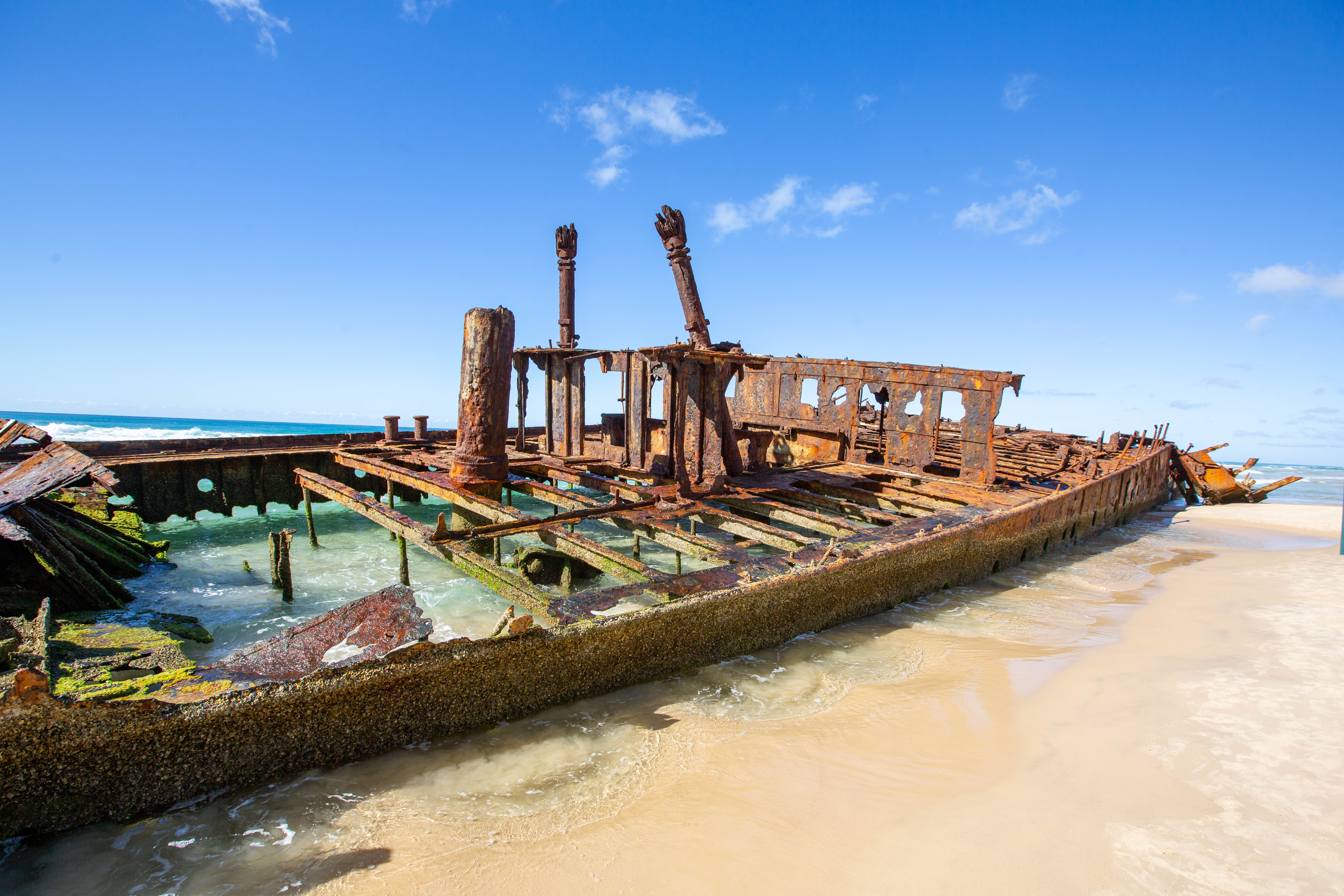
The wreck of SS Maheno near Eli Creek, 2019

A major landmark on Fraser Island is the shipwreck of SS Maheno. Maheno was built in Scotland in 1905 as a luxury passenger ship for the trans-Tasman crossing. During World War I it served as a hospital ship in the English Channel, and was then returned to its owners to resume usual commercial operation. By 1935, the ship had been taken out of service and was sold to a ship-breaker in Japan. On 25 June 1935, while being towed to Osaka to be broken up, the ship was caught in a strong cyclone about 80 km (50 mi) off the coast of Queensland. The towline parted, and on 9 July 1935 Maheno became beached on the east coast of Fraser Island.

During World War II, the wreck served as target bombing practice for the RAAF and was used as an explosives demolition target by special forces from the Fraser Commando School. The remains of the ship are now severely rusted, with almost three and a half storeys buried under the sand. Because of the danger it poses, climbing on the wreck is not permitted.

=== Fraser Commando School (WW2) ===
During World War II, the area near McKenzie's Jetty was used by the Services Reconnaissance Department (popularly known as "Z Special Unit") as a special forces training camp – the Fraser Commando School. Thousands of soldiers were trained here because the conditions were similar to those found on Pacific Islands where the Japanese were fought.

=== Nauru resettlement proposition (1961) ===
As part of ongoing meetings in the United Nations Trusteeship Council on the "Conditions in the Trust Territories", the Republic of Nauru expressed concern that its phosphate mining exportation would be depleted by the end of the century, endangering the future of the island. In 1961, Fraser Island was proposed by Australia as a location for the resettlement of the entire population of the Republic of Nauru. The timber industry on Fraser Island managed to ensure that resettlement on Fraser Island did not proceed. In 1964 in the 31st session of United Nations Trusteeship Council meetings it was concluded that Curtis Island could provide a more satisfactory resettlement for the population of Nauru. Nauru rejected the offer of moving the entire population to Curtis Island due to political independence considerations that Australia would not agree to. When visiting the island in 1964, the head of the Nauru delegation, Hammer de Roburt, insisted on this point of sovereignty to protect his people from the overt racism that he himself experienced on this tour. Although a resettlement never did occur, the Republic of Nauru went on to achieve independence on 31 January 1968.

=== World Heritage Site (1992) ===
In 1992, Fraser Island was listed as a UNESCO World Heritage Site. In 2021, the listing was updated to add the traditional Butchulla Aboriginal name of K'gari as well as the island's colonial name of Fraser Island. In 2009, as part of the Q150 celebrations, Fraser Island was announced as one of the Q150 Icons of Queensland for its role as a "natural attraction".

=== Native title (2014) ===
In October 2014 the Federal Court determined the Butchulla people had native title rights over the island. This enables Butchulla people to hunt, fish, and take water for domestic purposes; and opens the island up to economic opportunities for current and future generations of Butchulla people through ecotourism and related business development.

=== 2020 bushfire ===
On 14 October 2020, a large bushfire was started on the island by an illegal campfire. It impacted multiple communities and caused residents to flee their homes as it burned out of control.

In early December interstate assistance, including from the New South Wales Rural Fire Service (NSWRFS) who provided a Boeing 737-300 Large Air Tanker waterbombing aircraft, was used to fight the fire as Happy Valley township was threatened. High temperatures, 32 °C (90 °F), and strong winds hindered fire fighting and Queensland Fire and Emergency Services (QFES) Director Brian Cox said "A lot of this fire is burning in inaccessible country...".

Heavy rainfall in mid-December helped contain the fire and the QFES was able to hand control back to the Queensland Parks and Wildlife Service (QPWS). This was the longest burning fire of the 2020–21 bushfire season up to 14 December 2020 as it had been burning since October, over two months, and as of that date, more than half the island had been "blackened" by fire.

The island reopened to tourists on 15 December. The fire was still burning, but the island was declared safe for visitors, though access to some walking trails and burned areas was still restricted for safety. It was expected that the burned areas would successfully regenerate.

== Demographics ==
In the 2021 census, the island had a population of 152.

== Toponymy ==
The earliest known name of the island is K'gari in the Butchulla (Badjala) language (pronounced "gurri" or "GUR-rie"), which comes from a creation story of the Butchulla. In the story, the creator being Beiral sent his messenger Yendingie to create land and sea for the people. His helper, a "beautiful white spirit called Princess K'gari", worked hard to create the shores and the land, but afterwards persuaded Yedingie to let her stay on their beautiful creation. In order to stay, she had to be changed into an island, so Yedingie created lakes, vegetation, animals and people to keep her company. She remains today, happy "in, and as a 'paradise'".

Not knowing it was an island, James Cook named it Great Sandy Cape on 20 May 1770.

After European colonisation, it was called Great Sandy Island, and then Fraser Island from 1842, after Captain James Fraser, master of Stirling Castle, who was shipwrecked and died on the island in early August 1836.

The island has also been referred to as Thoorgine, or Thoorgine Island.

In 2011, the Indigenous names of K'gari and Gari were entered as alternative names for the island in the Queensland Place Names register.

In 2017, the Queensland National Parks and Wildlife Service began referring to the Fraser Island section of Great Sandy National Park as the K'gari (Fraser Island) section, in recognition of the Butchulla name.

In September 2021, the World Heritage Area within Great Sandy National Park, along with the surrounding waters and parts of the nearby mainland, was renamed "K'gari (Fraser Island)". The move was celebrated at a ceremony with elders and representatives of the Butchulla people on the island. The name change was formally adopted at the 44th session of the World Heritage Committee, and was a major milestone in a long running campaign by the region's traditional owners. According to the Butchulla people, K'gari (meaning 'paradise') is the name "of a beautiful white spirit", about which they say "She is beautiful to us - she is our mother" and "She provides food, water, and shelter and in return we protect and preserve her, as per the 3 lores that Yindingie gave us".

On 7 June 2023, the dual name was dropped by the Queensland Government and both the geographical feature and locality were officially renamed K'gari. This was done following an open consultation process in which the government indicated 70% of submissions supported the change. However, the change was criticised by some opposition Liberal National Party parliamentarians.

== Past industries ==
=== Logging (1863–1991) ===
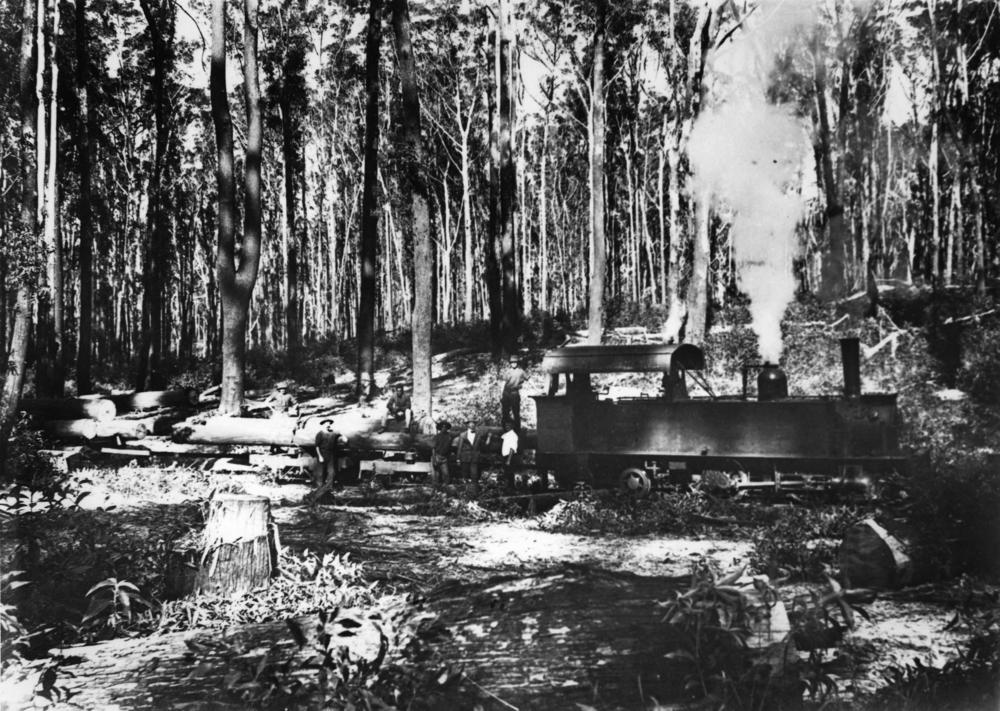
McKenzie's Tramway Locomotive, c. 1920

Logging on the island began in 1863, initiated by American Jack Piggott (known as "Yankee Jack"). Piggott's contribution, however, was limited as he was killed the following year by Indigenous people on the northern part of the island after what was rumoured to be a "black-shooting expedition" went awry. Blackbutt trees (Eucalyptus pilularis), Queensland kauri (Agathis robusta) and satinay or Fraser Island turpentine (Syncarpia hillii) were extensively exploited as they provided excellent timber. Satinay logs were sent to Egypt to be used in the construction of the Suez Canal. For the first 70 years of logging, bullock drays were used to haul the timber to loading points on the beach. Railway tracks were laid through the forest to facilitate logging, but were later removed. The logging industry continued until 1991, ceasing following concerns raised by the Commission of Inquiry into the Conservation, Management and Use of Fraser Island and the Great Sandy Region, appointed by the Goss Labor government and chaired by Justice Tony Fitzgerald.

=== Sand mining (1950–1977) ===
The geology of the island includes extensive deposits of rutile, ilmenite, zircon and monazite. Sand mining leases were first granted in 1950, and mining continued until 1977. Without public knowledge the Queensland Government granted mining leases to the American mining company Dillingham-Murphyores in the 1960s. In 1971, the Fraser Island Defenders Organisation (FIDO) opposed the granting of more leases to the company. Despite more than 1,300 submissions that were made to the local mining warden objecting to new leases, the submission was granted. FIDO took the case to the High Court of Australia which overruled the decision noting that the public interest was not being upheld. Dillingham-Murphyores continued mining. The Whitlam government established Australia's first environmental impact inquiry, which recommended that mining cease. Eventually the Fraser government cancelled the company's mineral export licence, which halted mining on the island. That represented a significant win for the conservation movement in Australia. Fraser Island then became the first place to be included in the Australian Heritage Commission's Register of the National Estate.

== Geography and ecology ==
The island is about 123 km (76 mi) long and 22 km (14 mi) wide. It was inscribed as a World Heritage Site in 1992. The island is the largest sand island in the world at 1,840 km^{2} (710 sq mi). It is also Queensland's largest island, Australia's sixth largest island and the largest island on the east coast of Australia.

K'gari has rainforests, eucalyptus woodland, mangrove forests, wallum and peat swamps, sand dunes and coastal heaths. It is made up of sand that has been accumulating for approximately 750,000 years on volcanic bedrock that provides a natural catchment for the sediment carried on a strong offshore current northwards along the coast. Unlike on many sand dunes, plant life is abundant due to the naturally occurring mycorrhizal fungi present in the sand, which release nutrients in a form that can be absorbed by the plants. The island is home to a small number of mammal species, as well as a diverse range of birds, reptiles and amphibians, including the occasional saltwater crocodile. The island is protected as part of the Great Sandy National Park, and is a popular tourism destination.

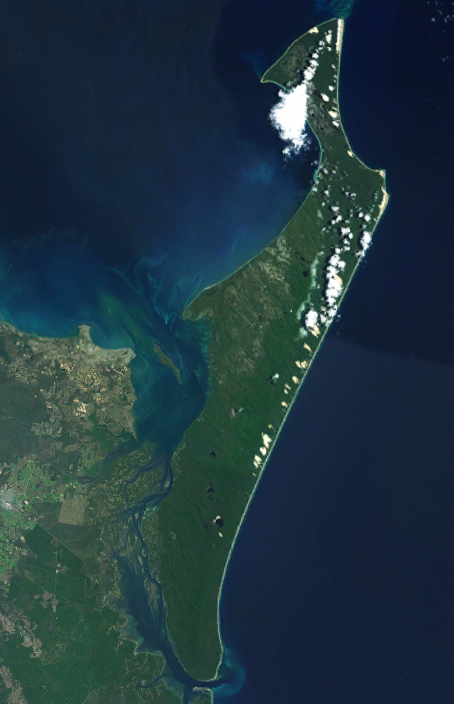
NASA Landsat image of insular K'gari

K'gari is separated from the mainland by Great Sandy Strait. The southern tip, near Tin Can Bay, is situated to the north of Inskip Peninsula. The most northern point of the island is Sandy Cape where the Sandy Cape Light was established in 1870 and is still operating. The establishment of the lighthouse was the first permanent European settlement on the island. The nearest large town to the island is Hervey Bay, while Maryborough and Bundaberg are also close by. The bay on the north east coast is called Marloo Bay and on the north west coast is Platypus Bay. The most westerly place on the island is Moon Point.

The island is divided into two localities: the eponymous K'gari locality consisting of most of the land on the island and the locality of Eurong on the east coast of the island.

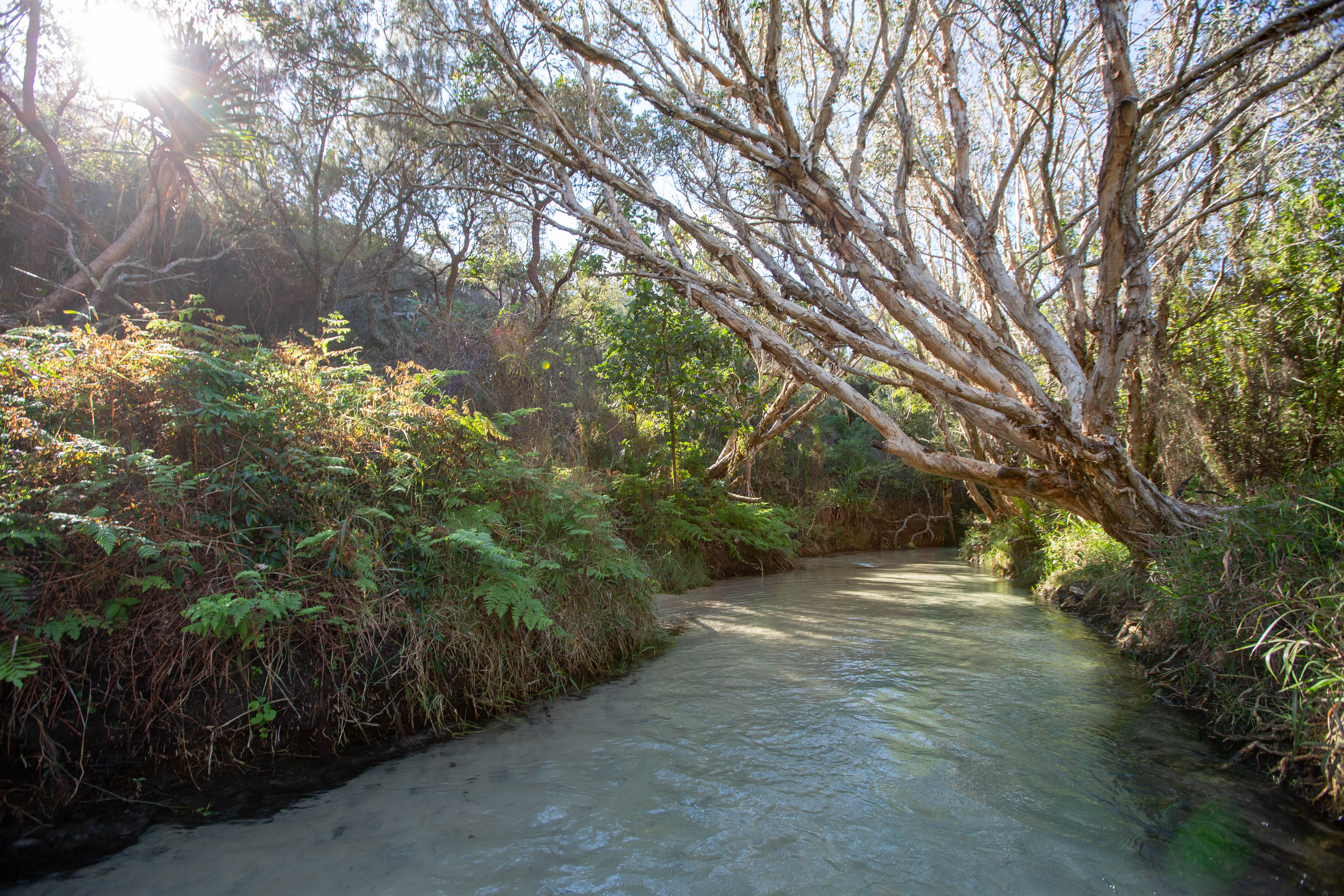
Eli Creek is the largest creek on the eastern beach.

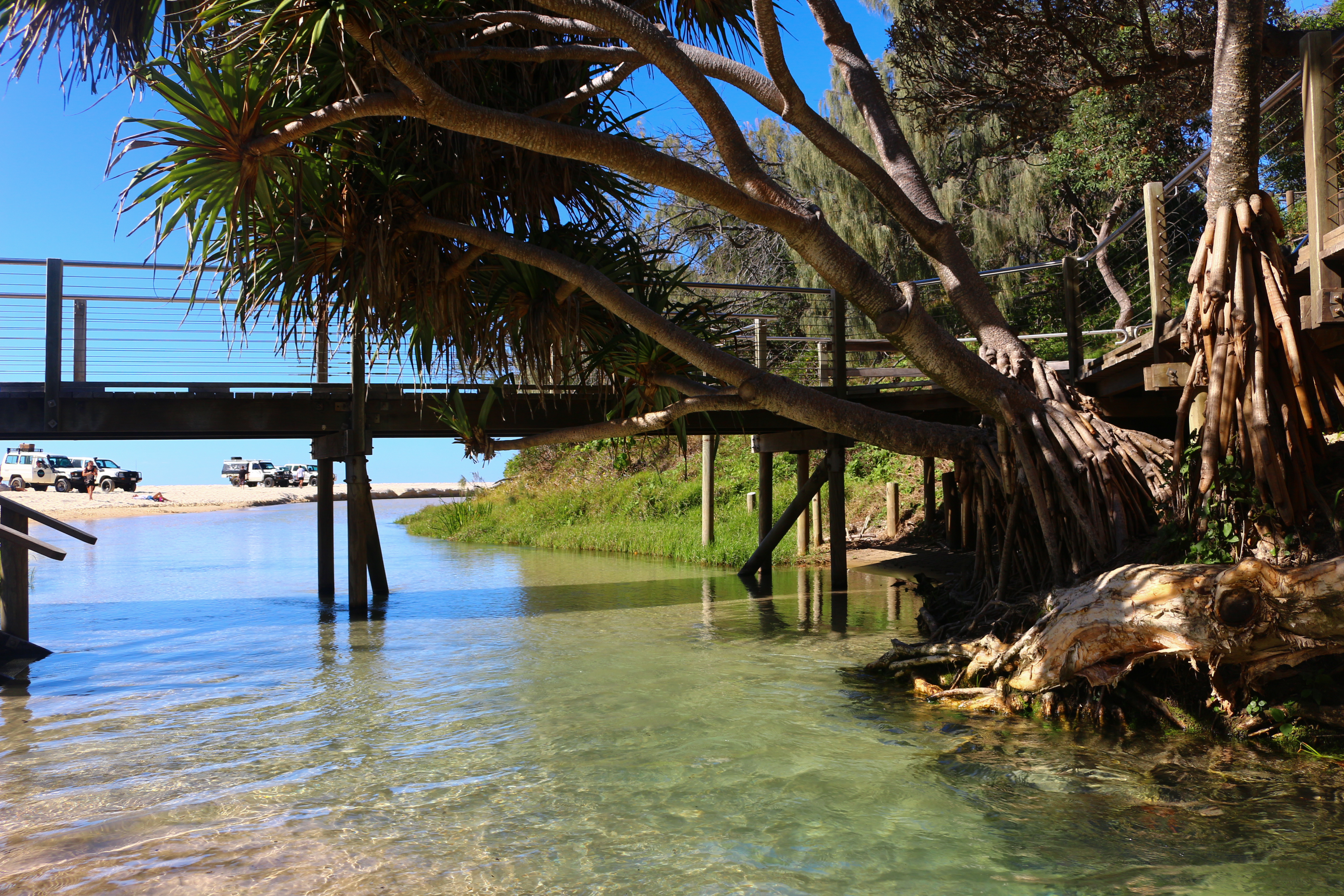
Eli Creek where it enters the sea

Eli Creek is the largest freshwater creek on the east coast of K'gari with a flow of 80 million litres per day. Eli Creek has its own unique and varied wild life. Coongul Creek, on the west coast, has a flow rate of four to five million litres per hour. Some of the swamps on the island are fens, particularly near Moon Point. That was only discovered in 1996, when a group of experts who had attended a Ramsar conference in Brisbane flew over the island and conducted an aerial survey. From above, they noticed the distinct patterns of potholed peat devoid of trees. That was the first instance of fens being found in Australia and in a sub-tropical region, although more were subsequently discovered on the adjacent Cooloola coast.

=== Sandmass and The Pinnacles ===
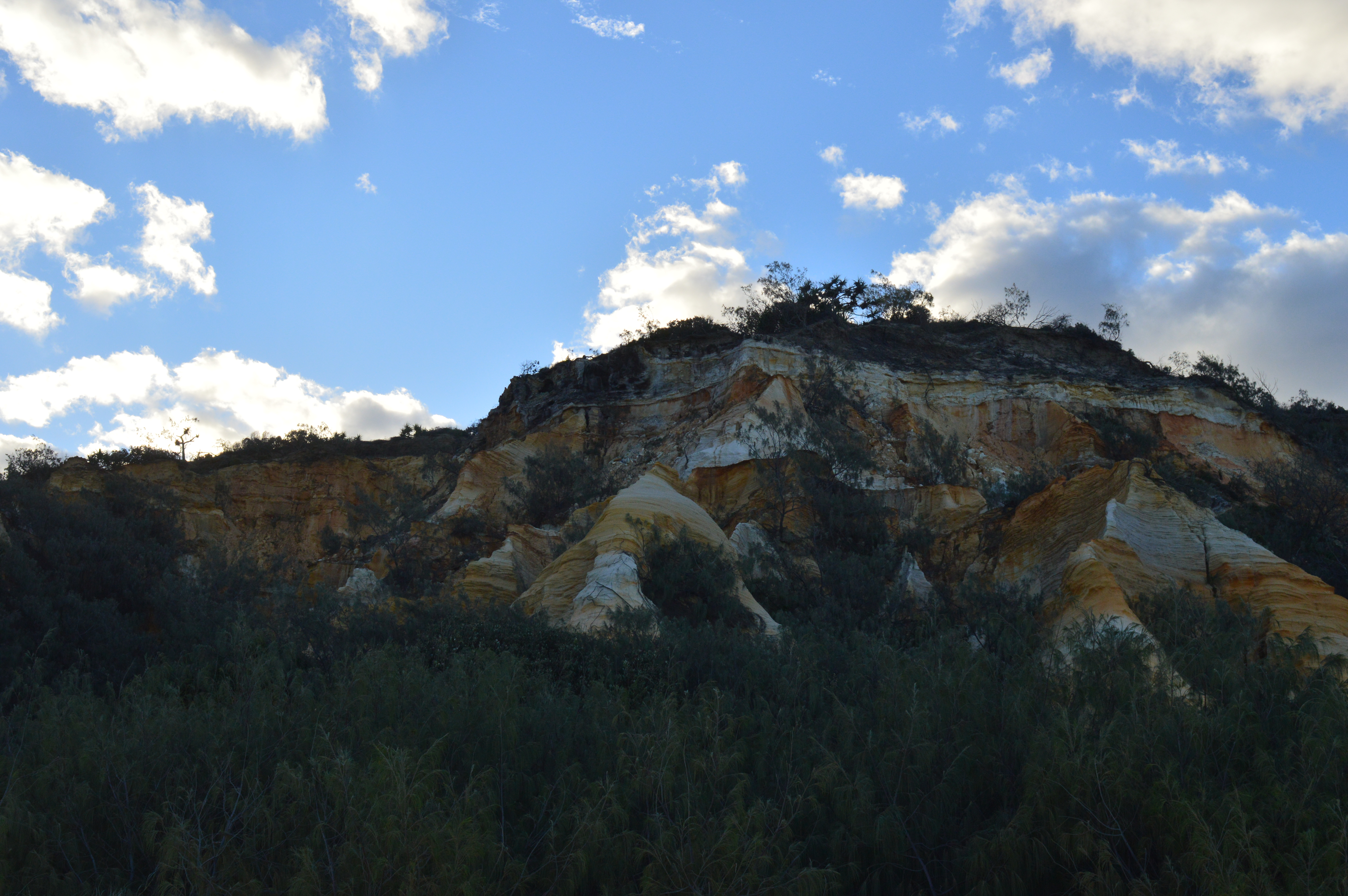
The Pinnacles on K'gari

The total volume of sand above sea level on K'gari is directly proportional to the mass of 113 km^{3} (27 mi^{3}). All of the sand, which originated in the Hawkesbury, Hunter and Clarence River catchments in New South Wales, has been transported northward by longshore drift driven by onshore winds from the southeast and repeated wave actions. Along the eastern coast of the island the process is removing more sand than it is depositing, resulting in the slow erosion of beaches which may accelerate with sea level rises attributed to climate change. The sand consists of 98% quartz.

All hills on K'gari have been formed by sandblowing. Sandblows are parabolic dunes which move across the island via the wind and are devoid of vegetation. In 2004, there was an estimated total of 36 sandblows on the island. With year-round winds from the southeast, the sand dunes on the island move at the rate of 1 to 2 metres a year and grow to a height of 244 metres. The dune movement creates overlapping dunes and sometimes intersects waterways and covers forests. Dune-building has occurred in episodes as the sea levels have changed, and once extended much further to the east. The oldest dune system has been dated at 700,000 years, which is the world's oldest recorded sequence.

The coloured sands found at Rainbow Gorge, The Cathedrals, The Pinnacles and Red Canyon are examples of the sand being stained over thousands of years due to it conglomerating with clay. Hematite, the mineral pigment responsible for the staining, acts like cement. That allows the steeper cliffs of coloured sand to form. Coffee rock, so-called because when it is dissolved in water it turns the colour of coffee, is found in outcrops along the beaches on both sides of the island.

The "75-Mile Beach" (120 km) runs along most of the east coast of K'gari. It is officially designated as a main road and is used as a landing strip for planes. Highway rules state that vehicles must give way to aircraft if they are oncoming. Along the beach are the Champagne Pools, Indian Head, the Maheno wreck, and the outflow of Eli Creek. Exposed volcanic rocks are found at Indian Head, Waddy Point and Middle Rocks, as well as near Boon Boon Creek.

=== Lakes ===
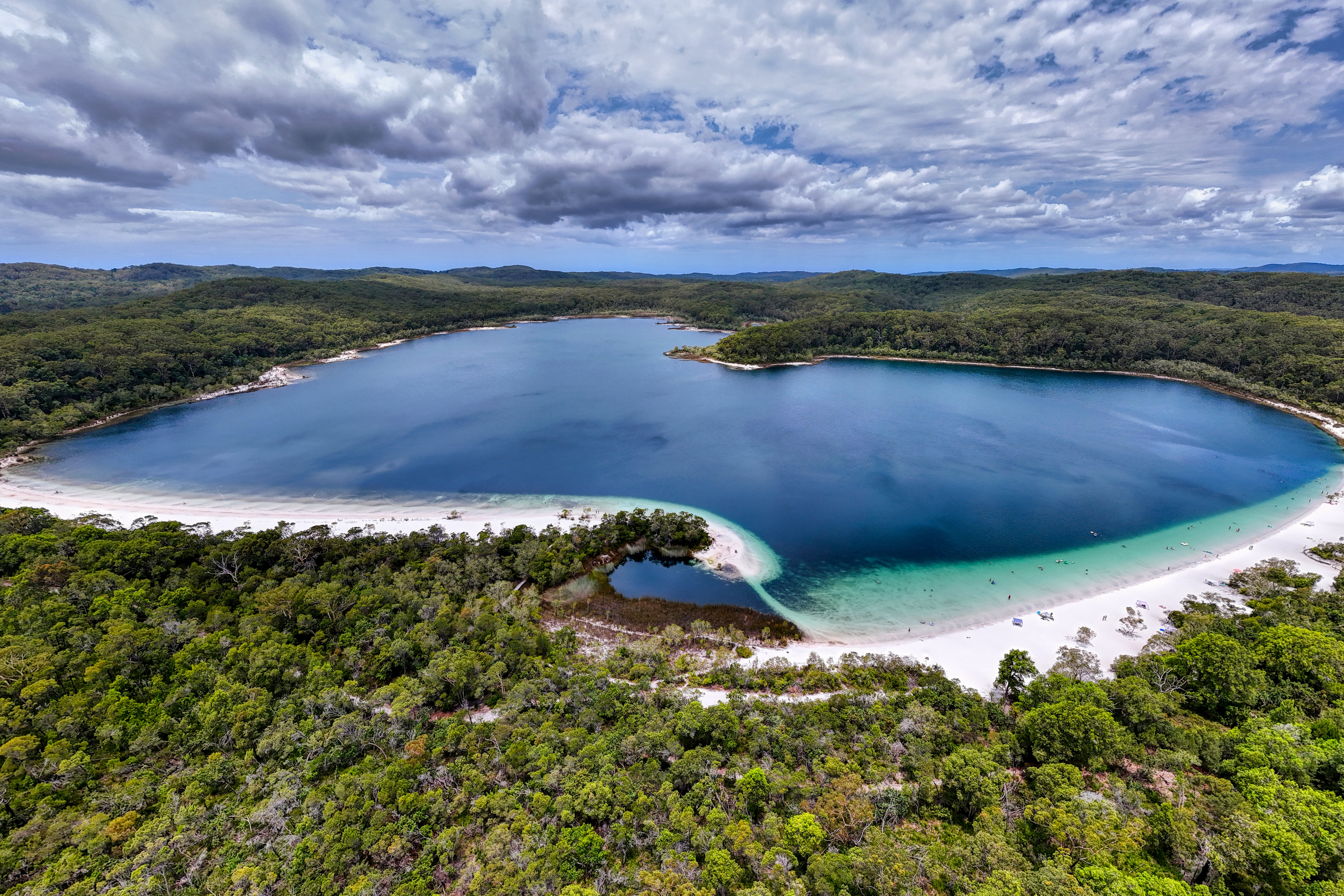
Lake McKenzie, 2024

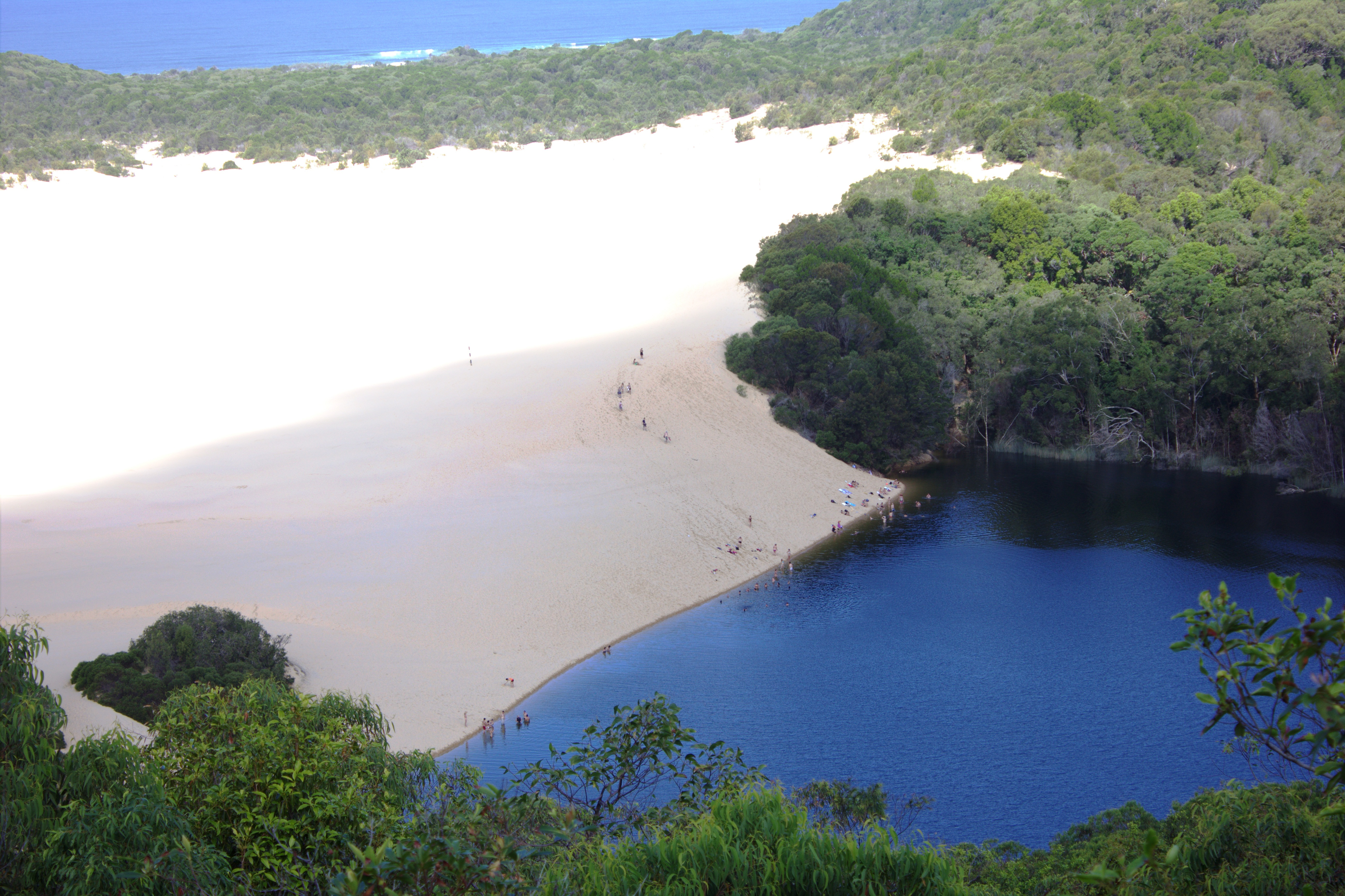
Hammerstone Sandblow and Lake Wabby

K'gari has more than 100 freshwater lakes, the second highest concentration of lakes in Australia after Tasmania. The freshwater lakes on the island are some of the cleanest in the world. Some of the most popular lakes including Lake McKenzie (or Boorangoora), Lake Allom and Basin Lake have existed for over 35,000 years – since before the end of the last ice age. A popular tourist area, Lake McKenzie, is located inland from the small town of Eurong. It is a perched lake, sitting on top of compact sand and vegetable matter 100 m (330 ft) above sea level. Lake McKenzie has an area of 150 hectares and is just over 5 m (16 ft) deep. The beach sand of Lake McKenzie is nearly pure silica. The lakes have very few nutrients and their pH varies, but sunscreen and soaps cause a pollution problem. Fresh water on the island may become stained by organic acids found in decaying vegetation. Because of the organic acids, a pH level as low as 3.7 has been measured in some of the island's perched lakes. The acidity prevents many species from inhabiting the lakes. Despite this, K'gari has the highest fish and amphibian diversity of any Australian island.

Another perched lake on K'gari is Lake Boomanjin which, at 200 hectares in size, is the largest perched lake on any sea island in the world. In total there are 40 perched lakes on the island, half of all known lakes of this kind on the planet. Lake Boomanjin is fed by two creeks that pass through a wallum swamp where it collects tannins which tint the water red. Lake Wabby is the deepest lake on the island, at 12 m (39 ft) in depth, and is also the least acidic, which means it has the most aquatic life of all the lakes.

Some of the lakes on K'gari are window lakes, a subtype of perched lakes, which form when the water table has risen to a point higher than the surrounding land. Most of the valleys on the island have creeks which are fed by springs. Motor boats and jet skis are banned from the lakes on the island.

=== Climate ===
K'gari has a tropical monsoon climate, bordering on a tropical rainforest climate with only one month missing the 60 mm precipitation mark, as well as a tropical savanna climate with the driest month frequently hitting the boundary of $100-\left(\frac{Annual\ Average\ Precipitation\ (mm)}{25}\right)$ (Köppen: Am/Af/Aw); beyond Inskip southwards, the climate transitions from tropical to subtropical. The region is generally warm and not subject to extremes in temperature due to the moderating influence of the ocean. Temperatures rarely rise above 33 °C (91 °F) or drop below 7 °C (45 °F) and humidity is consistently high. Rainfall is heaviest during the summer and early autumn, and the annual average is 1,251 mm (49.25 in). Cyclones can be a threat; Cyclone Hamish brushed the island as a category 5 in March 2009, while Cyclone Oswald in January 2013 was significantly weaker at a Category 1. Both storms however caused severe beach erosion, particularly on the island's northern tip. The average annual temperature of the sea ranges from 22 °C (72 °F) between July and September to 27 °C (81 °F) between January and March.

Climate data for Fraser Island (Sandy Cape Lighthouse), 1991–2025
Month	Jan	Feb	Mar	Apr	May	Jun	Jul	Aug	Sep	Oct	Nov	Dec	Year
Record high °C (°F)	34.2 (93.6)	35.8 (96.4)	34.7 (94.5)	31.4 (88.5)	28.7 (83.7)	27.8 (82.0)	26.5 (79.7)	27.2 (81.0)	29.3 (84.7)	31.8 (89.2)	33.2 (91.8)	36.0 (96.8)	36.0 (96.8)
Mean daily maximum °C (°F)	29.8 (85.6)	29.8 (85.6)	28.9 (84.0)	27.1 (80.8)	24.4 (75.9)	22.4 (72.3)	21.8 (71.2)	22.8 (73.0)	24.9 (76.8)	26.3 (79.3)	27.8 (82.0)	29.1 (84.4)	26.3 (79.3)
Daily mean °C (°F)	26.2 (79.2)	26.3 (79.3)	25.4 (77.7)	23.7 (74.7)	21.1 (70.0)	19.1 (66.4)	18.2 (64.8)	19.1 (66.4)	21.2 (70.2)	22.6 (72.7)	24.2 (75.6)	25.5 (77.9)	22.7 (72.9)
Mean daily minimum °C (°F)	22.7 (72.9)	22.8 (73.0)	22.0 (71.6)	20.3 (68.5)	17.9 (64.2)	15.8 (60.4)	14.7 (58.5)	15.5 (59.9)	17.5 (63.5)	19.0 (66.2)	20.6 (69.1)	21.9 (71.4)	19.2 (66.6)
Record low °C (°F)	16.7 (62.1)	16.1 (61.0)	14.6 (58.3)	13.3 (55.9)	9.6 (49.3)	6.7 (44.1)	5.2 (41.4)	5.6 (42.1)	9.4 (48.9)	11.2 (52.2)	13.9 (57.0)	16.0 (60.8)	5.2 (41.4)
Average rainfall mm (inches)	160.6 (6.32)	172.0 (6.77)	153.0 (6.02)	130.3 (5.13)	115.3 (4.54)	109.8 (4.32)	106.0 (4.17)	63.3 (2.49)	38.1 (1.50)	73.4 (2.89)	103.2 (4.06)	102.2 (4.02)	1,327.2 (52.23)
Average rainy days (≥ 1.0 mm)	9.9	10.0	11.4	11.2	11.0	9.8	8.2	6.1	4.7	5.5	5.5	7.4	100.7
Source: Bureau of Meteorology

== Fauna ==
=== Mammals ===
Estimates of the number of mammal species present on K'gari range from 25 to 50. Mammals include swamp wallabies, echidnas, ringtail and brushtail possums, sugar gliders, squirrel gliders, phascogales, bandicoots, potoroos, flying foxes and dingoes. The swamp wallaby finds protection from dingoes in the swampy areas which have dense undergrowth. 19 species of bats live on or visit the island.

==== Dingoes ====
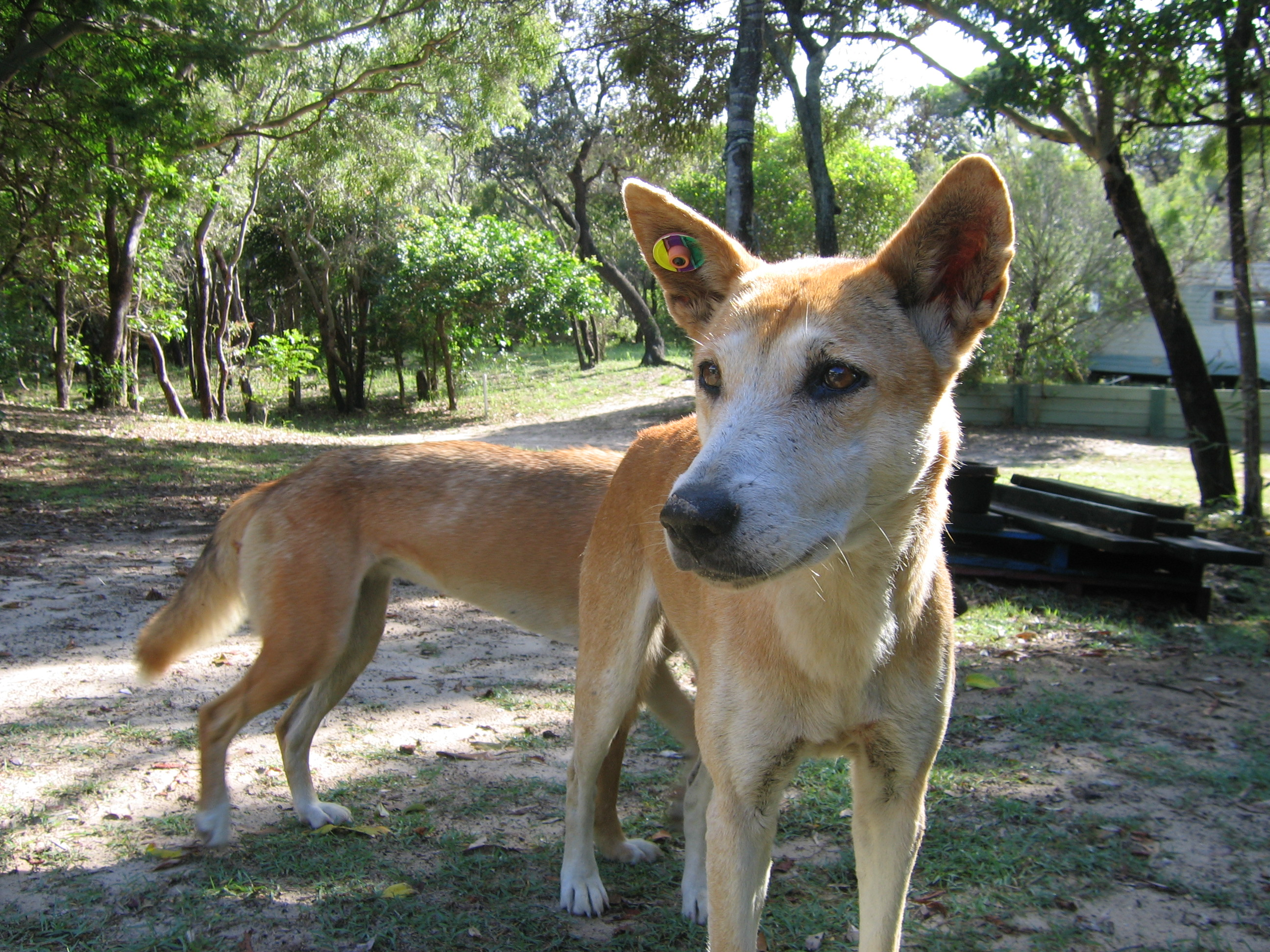
Fraser Island dingoes

Dingoes were once common on K'gari, but are now decreasing. The island dingoes are reputedly some of the last of the species to have not cross-bred with dogs in Eastern Australia and, to preserve this status, dogs are not allowed on the island. According to DNA examinations conducted in 2004, the island dingoes have not cross-bred with modern dogs. However, skull measurements from the 1990s detected cross-breeds between dingoes and domestic dogs among the population.

Up until 1995, there were no official records of dingoes attacking humans on K'gari. In April 2001, a boy named Clinton Gage wandered away from his family and was attacked and killed by several dingoes. More than 120 dingoes were killed by rangers as a result of the incident, though locals believe the number was much greater. After the 2001 attack, four dedicated rangers were allocated dingo management roles and ranger patrols were increased. There are fines for feeding dingoes or leaving food and rubbish out that may attract them.

A University of Queensland researcher, Nick Baker, claims the island dingoes have adopted unusual behaviour. Rather than hunt in small packs, island dingoes have developed a tolerance for each other and work together in one big hunting pack. Dingo-proof fences, consisting of metal bars across a concrete pit and a 1.8 m high mesh fence, were built around nine island settlements in 2008, to keep the dingoes out of the townships.

In March 2010, three separate reports of dingoes biting tourists were made. Tourists have been criticised for ignoring advice from park rangers as they try to provoke reactions from dingoes while taking photographs.

As of 2015, the number of dingoes on K'gari was estimated to be around 180 to 220.

=== Reptiles and amphibians ===
74 different species of reptiles have been recorded on K'gari. 18 species of snakes have been identified with one third of them considered dangerous, including the extremely venomous eastern brown snake. Goannas, snakes, geckos, skinks and frogs are all present on the island. Some frog species have evolved to cope with the acidic waters of lakes and swamps on the island, and are appropriately called acid frogs. The island is home to the recently discovered Fraser Island sand skink. Freshwater turtles such as Kreffts river turtle are found in the island's lakes and creeks.

Saltwater crocodiles are exclusively tropical reptiles and usually found in Far North Queensland (several hundred kilometres north-west of K'gari), however, occasionally during the warmer season (December through March, when water temperatures reach consistent tropical temperatures) crocodiles may appear in areas in and around the island. During the 2008–2009 summer several crocodiles (one over 4 metres in length) were present in the surrounding ocean. It is thought that these reptiles are seasonal visitors, as they always disappear during the cold months (presumably returning to tropical northern Queensland.) This sort of activity was apparently reported but unverified decades ago (a handful of crocodiles have also historically been observed on very rare occurrences around Brisbane, the Gold Coast and Sunshine Coast during the warmer season) but within recent years has been proven and observed more often. Crocodiles do not breed nor do they appear to have any permanent populations living on the island.

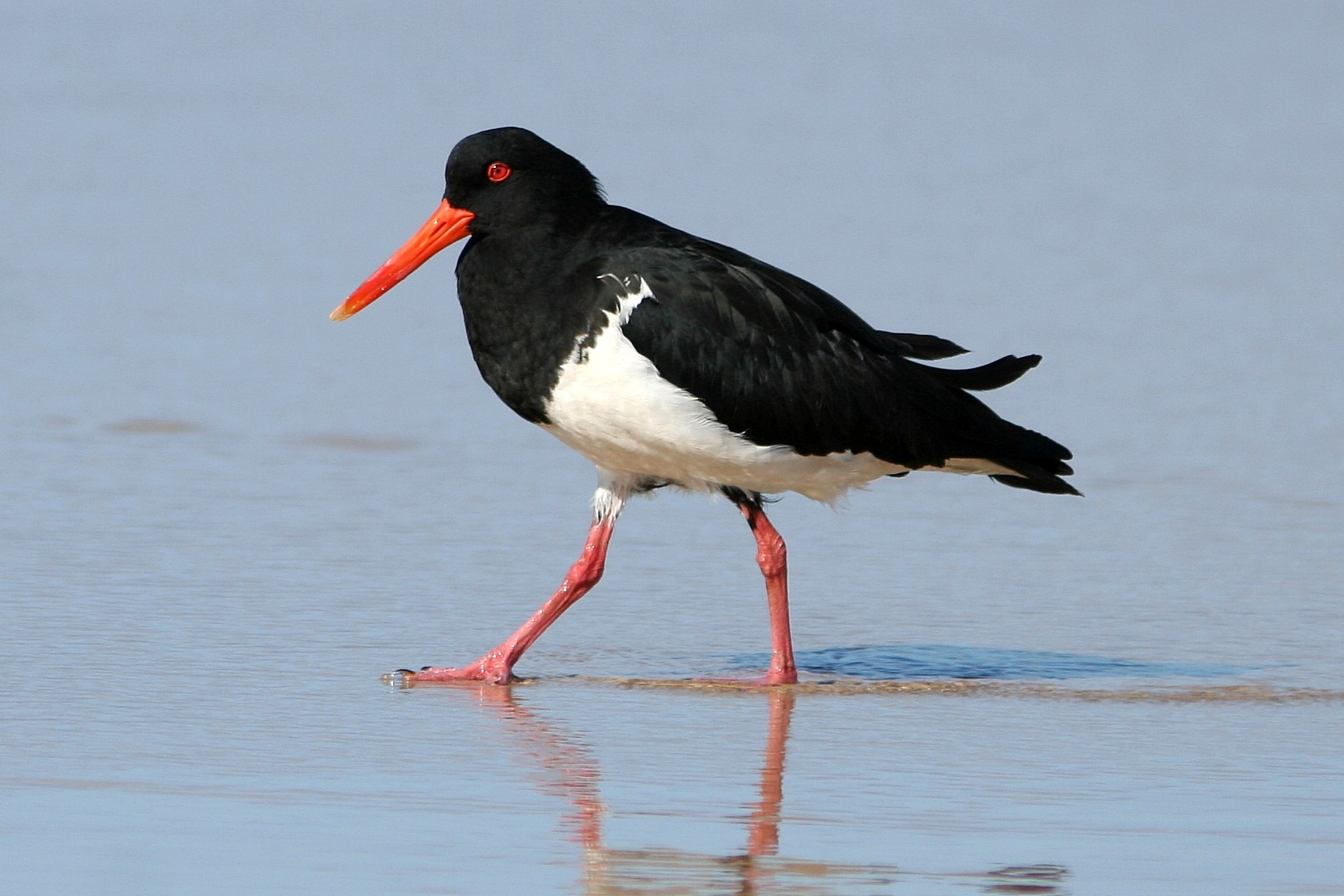
Pied oystercatcher

=== Birds ===
K'gari forms part of the Cooloola and Fraser Coast Important Bird Area (IBA). There are over 350 different species of birds on the island. Birds of prey include sea eagles, peregrine falcon, osprey and kites. Other common birds include pelicans, terns, honeyeaters, gulls, kingfishers, kookaburra, owls, doves, thornbills, ducks, brolgas, and cockatoos. The island is visited by 20 species of migratory wader birds from as far afield as Siberia. The island provides habitat for 22 different species of gull and tern, four species of falcon and six species of kingfisher. A rare bird on the island is the eastern ground parrot, already extinct in some parts of Australia.

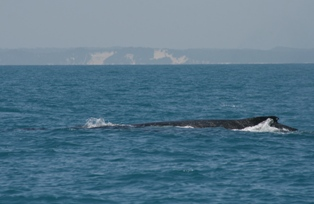
A humpback whale with the sand dunes of K'gari in the background

=== Other ===
Cetaceans, such as humpback whales and some species of dolphins are frequent visitors to the area. Dugongs and sea turtles can also be found in surrounding waters. Great white, bull and tiger sharks can be found, with the latter species sometimes approaching fishermen wading in the surf. Mud crabs are found on the western side of the island near mangrove-lined estuaries. 24 freshwater fish species are found in the island's lakes.

There has been 300 species of ants recorded on K'gari. Long finned eels and giant earthworms are also found on the island.

=== Invasive pests ===
Juvenile cane toad on K'gari; this invasive species is a major threat to the island's vulnerable acid-tolerant frogs.

A large feral cat population is currently being managed. Cats arrived with shipwrecks as early as the 1830s, and were brought by lighthouse keepers and townspeople from 1870. Despite a ban on them from 1991 and strict nature reserve prohibitions, numbers have grown and they threaten native wildlife particularly the vulnerable Cooloola Sedge Frog, Wallum Sedge Frog and Wallum Froglet.

A large cane toad population also causes severe ecological impacts and is also being managed. Cane toads have decimated the island's Death adder and Lace monitor populations, impacts the island's acid-tolerant frog species.

The settlements have notable black rat infestations. Native rats are frequently misidentified and killed due to the presence of the imported pest.

Until 2003, when they were removed by the Environmental Protection Agency, there were a few feral horses on the island, descendants of Arab stock turned loose for breeding purposes, and joined in 1879 by horses brought over for the logging industry.

== Flora ==
The flora of K'gari is diverse. More than 865 species of plants grow on the island. It is the only place on earth where tall rainforest grows in sand. The island contains the largest extent of wallum heath remnants in Queensland. In Pile Valley, 1,000-year-old rough-barked satinays are found. Despite being logged the kauri pines dominate in some areas. Scribbly gums, red gums, piccabeen palms, blue quandong, brush box and pandanus all grow on the island. Along the coast, the foredunes are dominated by salt-tolerant species which includes pigface, goats foot vine and beach spinifex. Spinifex sericeus is an important foundation species. Decayed matter from this dune grass breaks down in the sand, providing vital nutrients for other plant species, such as the beach oak. The rare Angiopteris evecta, a species of fern that has the largest fronds in the world, grows on the island. The southwest coast is dominated by mangroves. Persoonia prostrata was a shrub native to the island which is now extinct.

As one travels from east to west across K'gari, the dune age increases. This leads to the progressive maturing of vegetation in the same direction, except for some areas along the western coast where soil leaching has decreased the nutrient soil layer to a depth beyond the reach of plant roots. Each lake on the island is surrounded by concentric vegetation zones. Typically these zones range from rushes in the shallows, then a mix of pioneer species on the beaches, through to sedges, heath, paperbarks, shrubs and finally eucalypt or banksia woodlands.

== Governance and administration ==
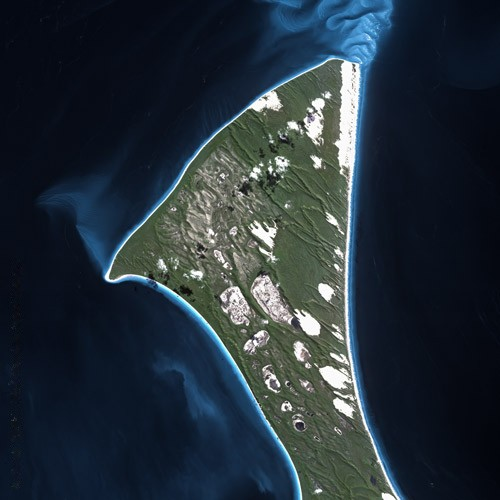
K'gari seen from Spot Satellite

K'gari and some satellite islands off the southern west coast comprised the Great Sandy Strait and previously formed the County of Fraser, which was subdivided into six parishes. Among the islands were Slain Island, Tooth Island, Roundbush Island, Moonboom Island, Gardner Island, Dream Island, Stewart Island, and the Reef Islands, all part of the southernmost parish of Talboor.

It is part of the local government area of Fraser Coast Region, which was created in March 2008 as a result of the report of the Local Government Reform Commission released in July 2007. Before the local government reorganisation, the island was split up evenly between the City of Hervey Bay (northern part) and the City of Maryborough (southern part).

In 1971, the northern half of K'gari was declared a national park. Now almost all of the island is included in the Great Sandy National Park, which is administered by Queensland's Environmental Protection Agency. This was extended in 1992 when heritage listing was granted. Except for a few small urban areas the island is protected by a Wild Rivers declaration.

Domestic dogs are not permitted on K'gari and fines can be given for non-compliance. The ban, first applied in 1981, is imposed so that the island's dingo population is not exposed to diseases, or cross breeding as the dingoes on the island have the purest DNA of dingoes anywhere.

In 2010, the management of the park, particularly the treatment of dingoes by the Department of Environment and Resource Management was called into question by Glen Elmes in the Queensland Parliament. Camp grounds are sometimes closed so as to reduce human contact with dingo populations.

== Heritage listings ==
K'gari, which is itself World Heritage listed, has a number of heritage-listed sites, including:

- Sandy Cape Light, north end of island
- SS Marloo, beached 3 miles (4.8 km) north of Waddy Point

The island was placed on the Australian National Heritage List on 21 May 2007.

== Tourism ==
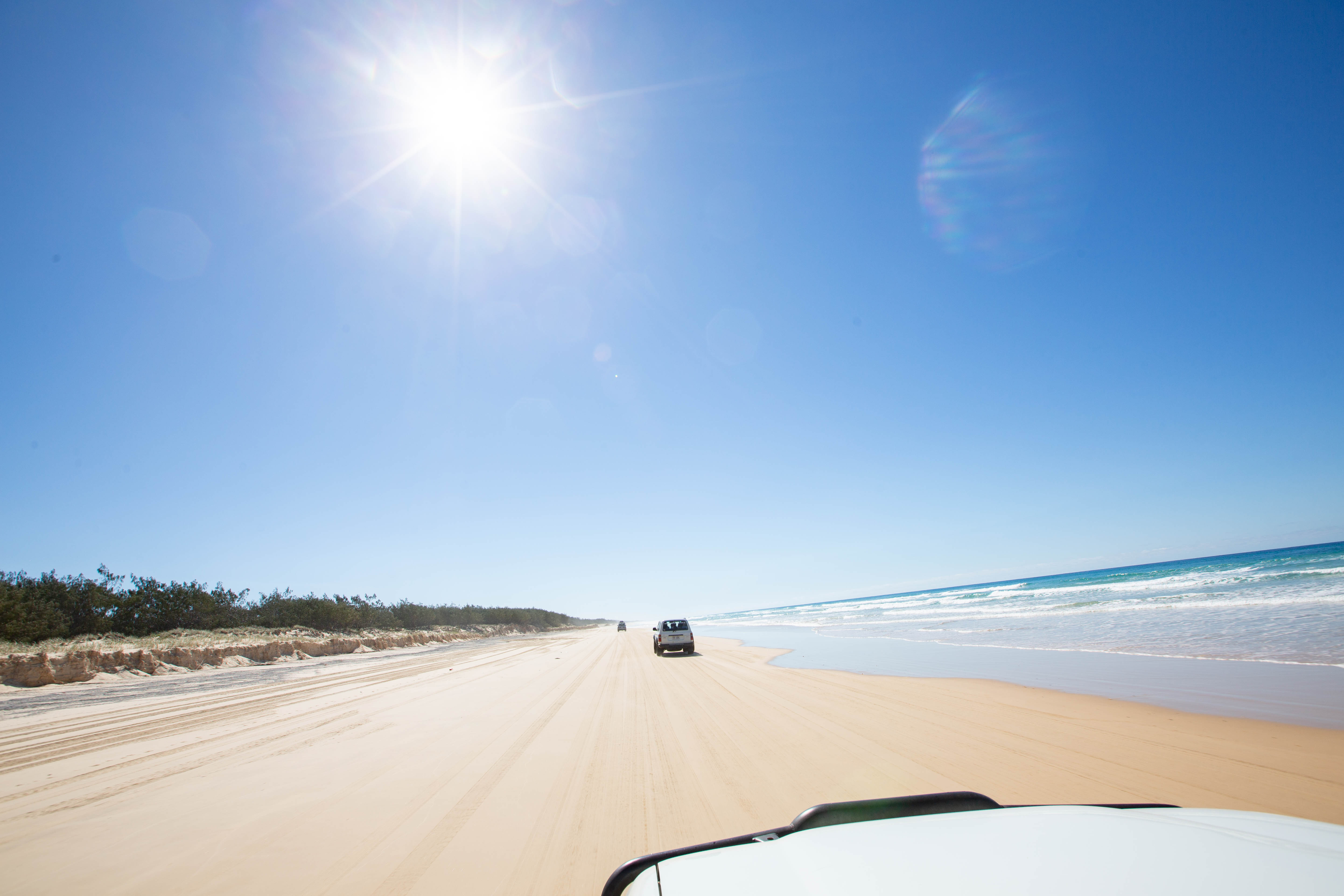
Truck on the beach

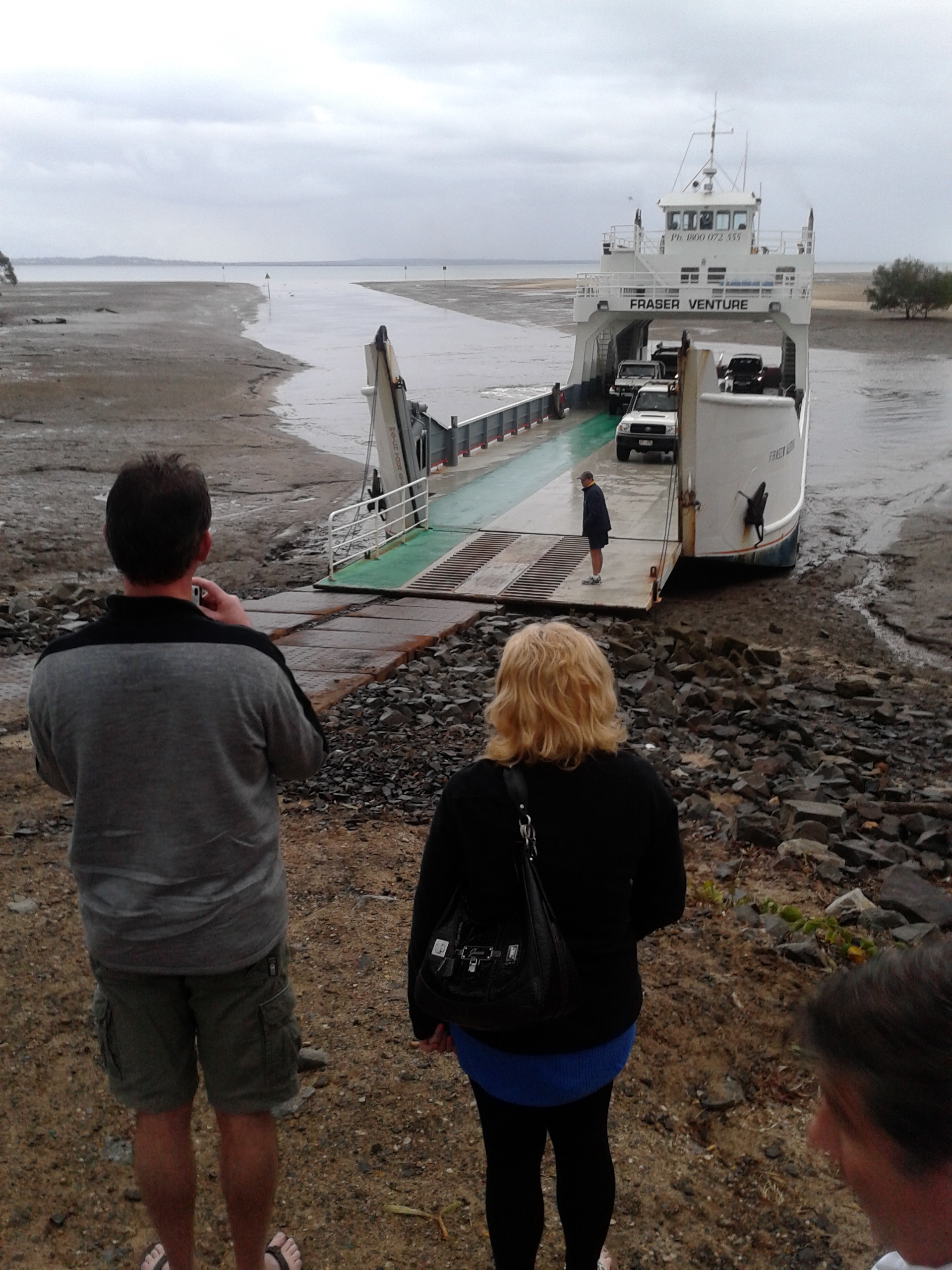
Fraser Island Ferry

K'gari is one of Queensland's most popular islands for tourists, who can reach the island by ferry from Hervey Bay or Rainbow Beach, which takes approximately 50 minutes. Estimates of the number of visitors to the island each year range from 350,000 to 500,000. The chance of seeing a dingo in its natural setting is one of the main reasons people visit the island. The use of boardwalks and marked tracks by visitors is encouraged to reduce erosion.

It was reported in 2009 that tourists had created environmental problems in K'gari's lakes and on coastal dunes, as the foredunes were being used as a toilet by an estimated 90,000 bush campers each year. Many of the perched lakes have no outflow or inflow which exacerbates the problem.

"Central Station", which was formerly the hub of the forestry industry when there was logging on K'gari, is a popular tourist destination.

The K'gari World Heritage Discovery Centre was officially opened by Fraser Coast Mayor George Seymour on 1 March 2021.

=== Access ===
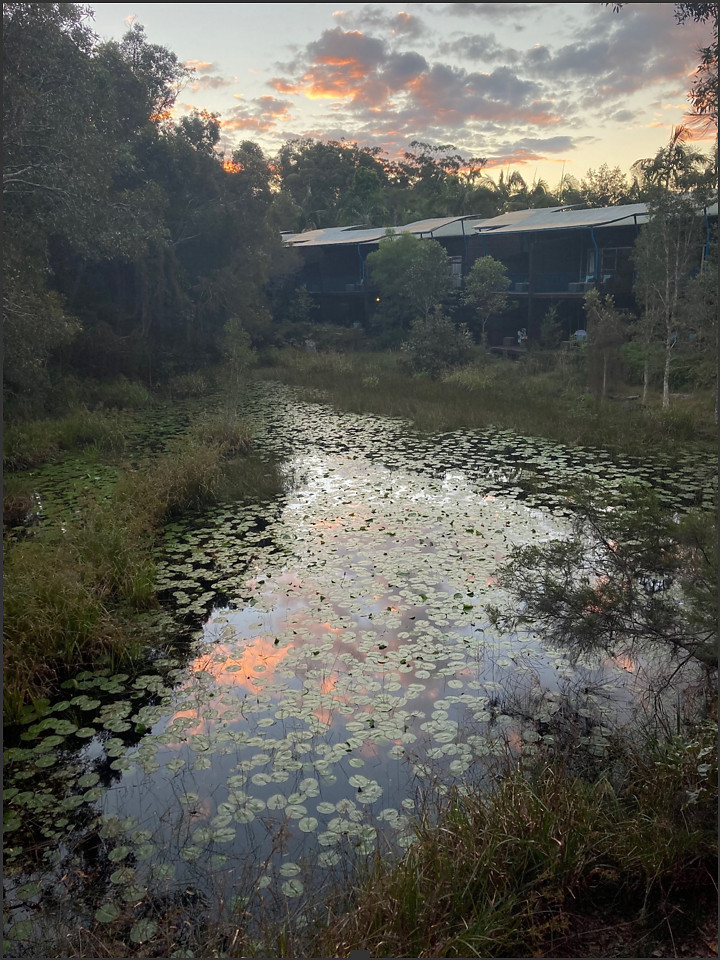
Kingfisher Bay Resort, 2022

The island can be reached by a ferry from River Heads (South of Hervey Bay) to Kingfisher Bay and Wanggoolba Creek or Inskip Point to north of Rainbow Beach to Hook Point, or by chartered flight from Sunshine Coast Airport.

A four-wheel drive is required for all landings (except Kingfisher Bay), and travel on the island (except within the Kingfisher Bay Resort). A permit is required for vehicles and is obtainable on-line from DERM and several outlets at Rainbow Beach. Several firms provide four-wheel drive vehicles for hire. Tour buses travel the island as well as several kinds of self-drive tours departing regularly from Hervey Bay, Rainbow Beach and Noosa.

=== Angling ===
Tailor is one of the more common species sought by anglers on K'gari and along the Queensland coast. Other fish caught on the eastern coast include jewfish, golden trevally and surf bream, while whiting, flathead and surf bream prefer the calmer western waters. Pilchards, bloodworms, yabbies, pipi and sandworms can all be used for bait. Fishing is banned in the island's freshwater creeks and lakes. There is an annual seasonal fishing closure between the beginning of 1 August to the end of 29 September, for eastern foreshore waters as well as waters within 400 m out to sea from the eastern shore and between 400 m north of Waddy Point and 400 m south of Indian Head. The fishing closure prohibits the taking of fin fish only and anglers are still allowed to hand collect worms and pipis during the closure.

=== Camping ===
There are many campgrounds on K'gari, with varying amenities and access. The main camping areas are: Dundubara Campground, Cathedrals on Fraser, Waddy Point campground, Central Station Tent Sites, Waddy Beach (tent only campsites), Cornwells Break (large group site), One Tree Rocks camp zone (Eurong-One Tree Rocks), however there are others. Permits are required for camping and also for vehicle access.

=== Hiking ===
There are various possibilities for overnight hiking on the island. Most notable is the 90 km long K'gari (Fraser Island) Great Walk. A shorter hike would be for example to start in Kingfisher Bay (ferry drop off) and head to Lake McKenzie, stay there for one night, and then hike back.

== See also ==
- Geography of Queensland
- Great Sandy Biosphere Reserve
- John Sinclair (environmentalist)
- Clifford Harry Thompson, geomorphologist, influential Fraser Island researcher
- List of islands of Australia
- Tourism in Australia
