= Indian Head (K'gari) =

Cape in Queensland, Australia

Indian Head Tukkee (Batjala)
- Headland
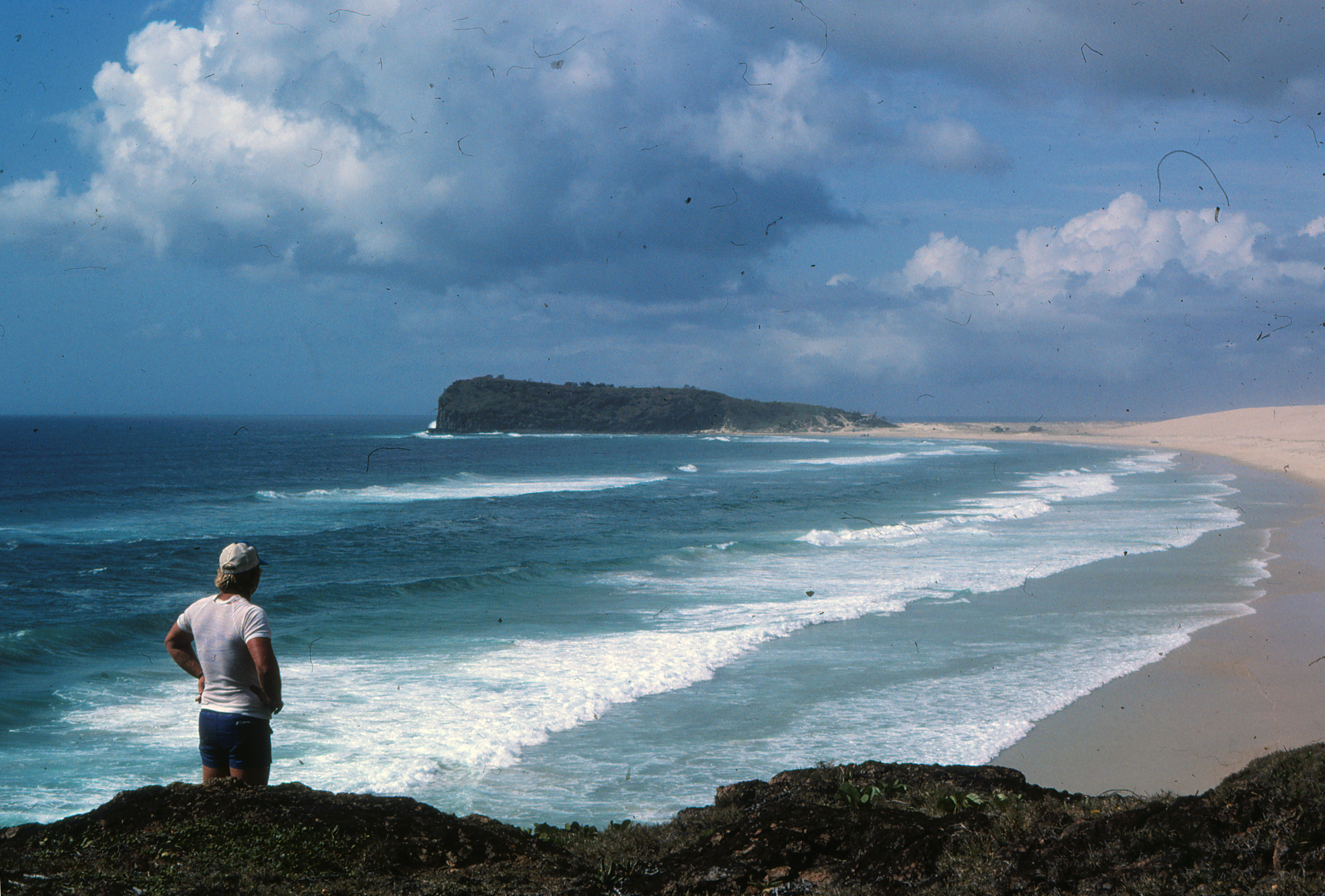
- Indian Head as viewed from Middle Rocks
- Interactive map of Indian Head
- Coordinates: 25°00′00″S 153°21′59″E
- Location: K'gari
- Water bodies: Coral Sea
- Geology: Sand
- Highest elevation: 40 metres (130 ft)

Indian Head (also known as Tukkee) is a coastal headland on the eastern (ocean) side of Fraser Island (also known as K'gari and Gari) off the coast of Queensland, Australia.

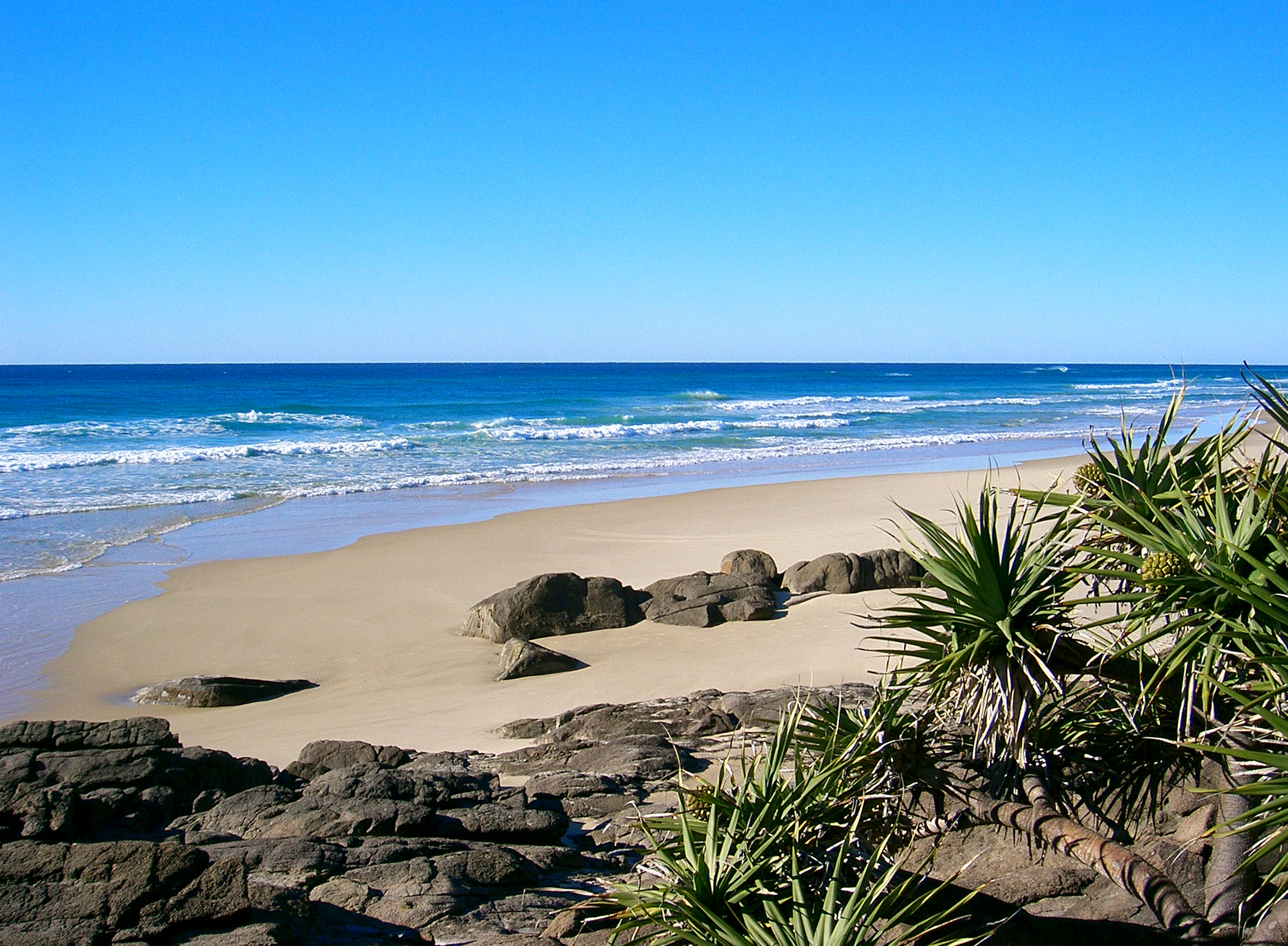
View south from beach

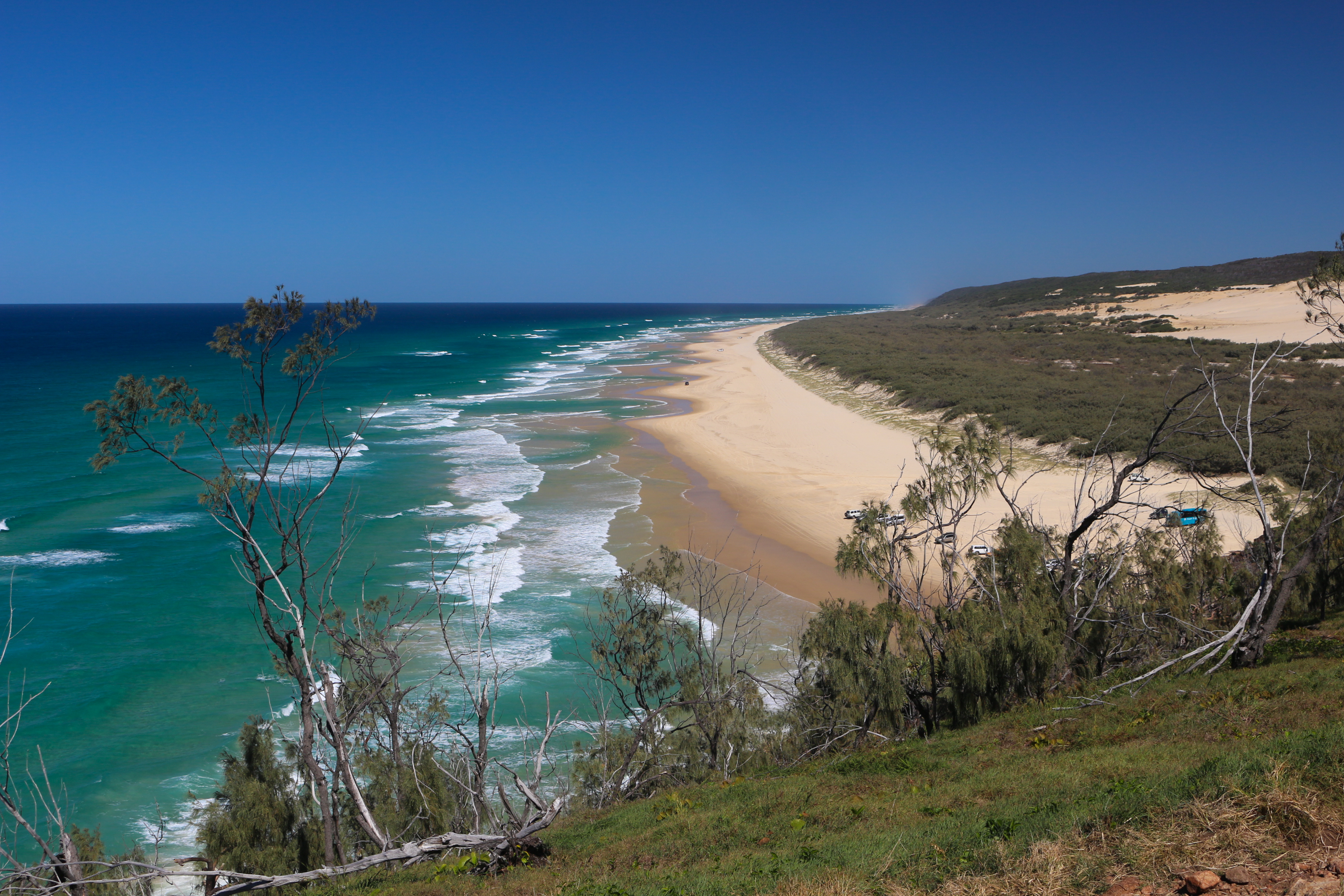
View south from headland

== Geography ==
The landmark is the most easterly point on the island and a popular tourist destination. Indian Head is located at one end of Seventy Five Mile Beach.

The outcrop consists of trachyte that was originally formed by volcanic activity 30 million years ago.

== History ==
The headland was named by Captain Cook when he passed it on the evening of 19 May 1770, noting "...on which a number of Natives were assembled...". The term "Indian" was used at that time for the native people of many lands. The headland is known as Tukkee in the Badtjala language, meaning stone or stone knife.

== Attractions ==
Climbing Indian Head provides 360° views as well as good wildlife spotting opportunities, such as manta rays, sharks and whales. Camping around the headland is not permitted.
