= Stirling Castle (1829 brig) =

United Kingdom ship

Coordinates: 21°01′42.3″S 152°54′35.2″E

United Kingdom
- Name: Stirling Castle
- Namesake: Stirling Castle
- Owner: Abrams & Co.
- Builder: Miramichi, New Brunswick
- Launched: 1829
- Fate: Wrecked 21 or 25 May 1836

General characteristics
- Tons burthen: 350 (bm)

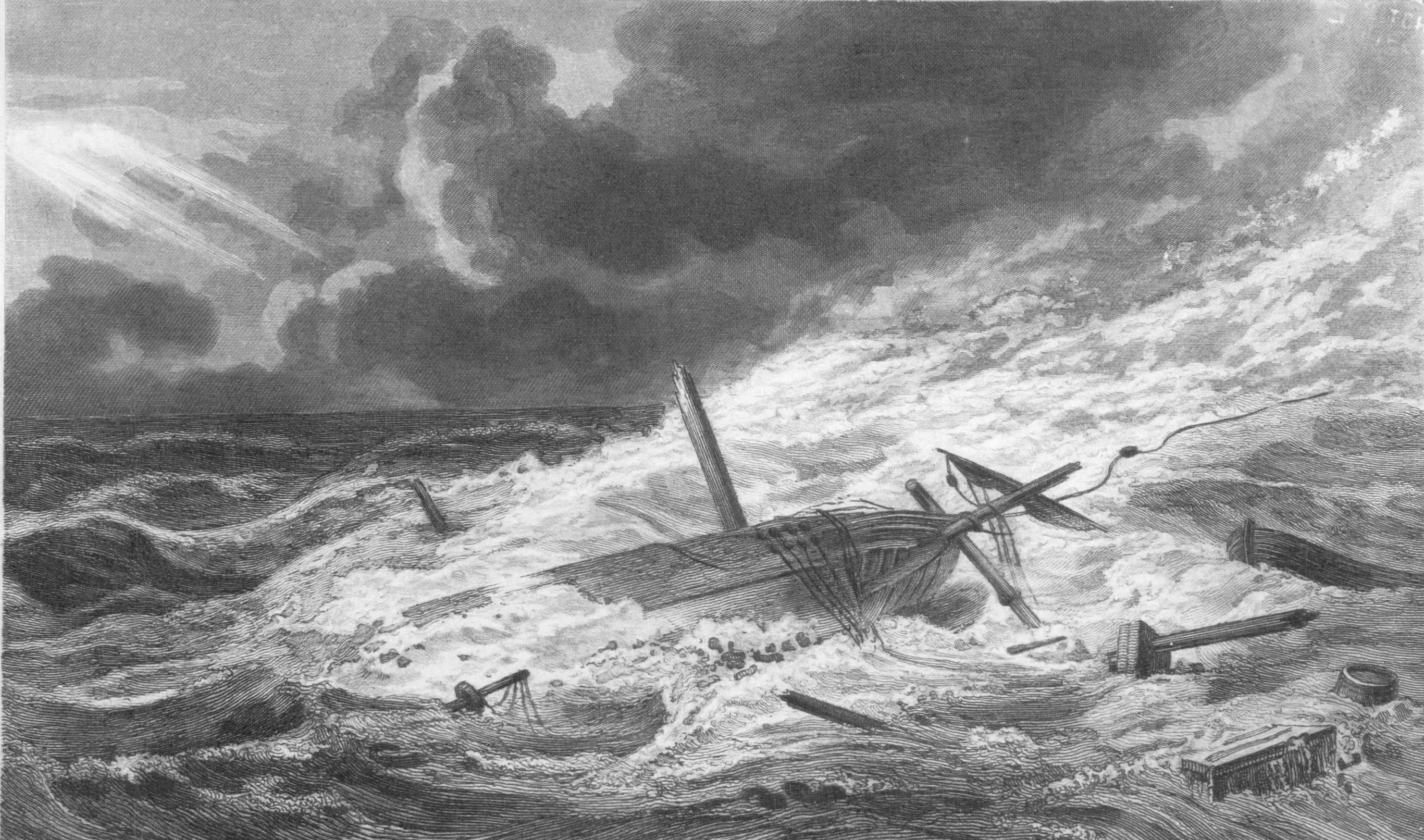
Artist's impression of the shipwreck

Stirling Castle was a British ship launched in 1829. She was wrecked in 1836 on Eliza Reef on passage from Sydney for Singapore and Manila.

== Career ==
Stirling Castle entered Lloyd's Register in 1830 with Fraser, Master, and Abrams & Co., owners, and trade Greenock–Quebec.

Before her fateful voyage, Stirling Castle had sailed from Greenock, Scotland, to the colony of Sydney in 1831 with John Dunmore Lang's "mechanics" with the intention of building the Australian College and the founding members of the Sydney Mechanics' School of Arts. On the trip the mechanics set up a university to teach one another the trade and skills each one had. One family that was on board this trip was the Petrie family that became a prominent Queensland family after arriving in Moreton Bay penal settlement in 1837.

== Loss ==
In 1836, Stirling Castle was under the command of Captain James Fraser. (Note: On 6 May 1829 Fraser was captain of Comet when she was wrecked in Torres Strait.) She ran aground on 25 May 1836 on the Swain Reefs (near present-day Rockhampton, Queensland) while travelling from Sydney to Singapore. The surviving members of the crew, including Fraser and his wife Eliza, managed to journey to the nearby Great Sandy Island (present-day K'gari) where they camped for several days before being taken captive by the local Butchulla group of Aboriginal people, who took from them their clothes and belongings and used them for forced labour. James Fraser died while in their captivity (accounts differ as to whether he died due to starvation, or as a result of being speared), however, Eliza Fraser, who had been subjected to "the most terrible and revolting sufferings" and some members of the crew were later rescued by a Lt. Charles Otter. Lloyd's List reported on 14 March 1837 that Stirling Castle, Fraser (late), master, had been totally lost on Eliza Reef.

Eliza Fraser later returned to the United Kingdom, where in England her services as a storyteller proved to be very much in demand, and she became a celebrity due to her ordeal. As a result of her association with Great Sandy Island, it was by the 1880s known as Fraser Island, though still known as K'gari by the Butchulla. The island and the locality of Fraser Island, Queensland were officially renamed K'gari in 2023.
