= Sand island =

Island that is largely made of sand

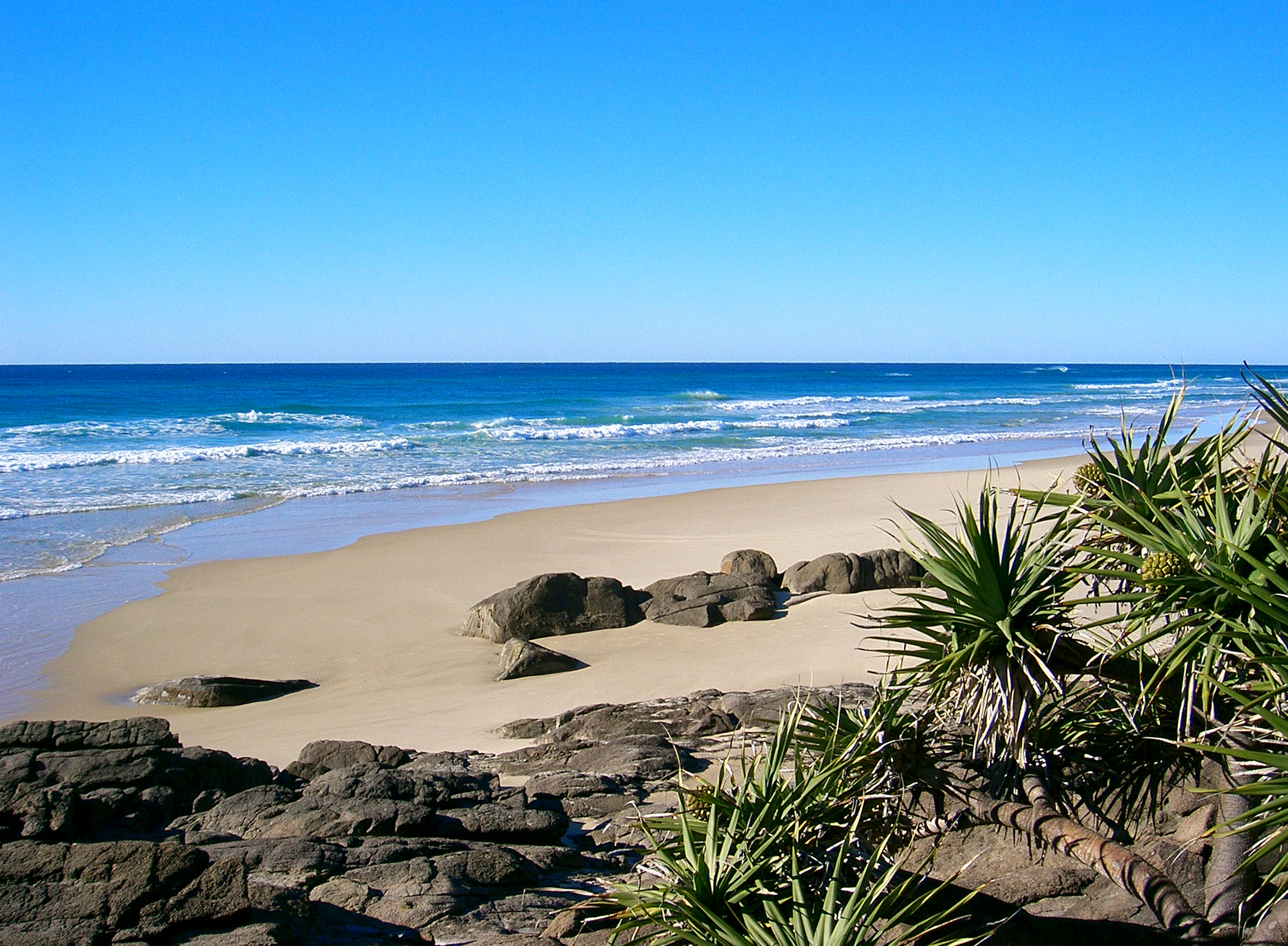
The world's largest sand island, K'gari, Australia, located along the coast of Australia

A sand island is an island that is mostly made of sand.

Sand islands

The largest sand island in the world is K'gari (also known by its former name Fraser Island), which lies to the east of Maryborough, on the Queensland coast in Australia. Other examples of large sand islands are Moreton, North Stradbroke and Bribie Islands which lie south of K'gari. Another notable sand island is Tigres Island (also called Baía dos Tigres) which is located in Angola.
