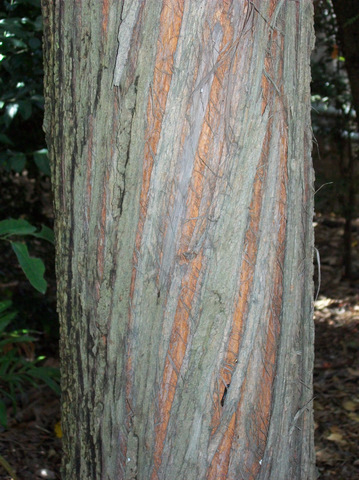
- fibrous bark of the Satinay

Scientific classification
- Kingdom: Plantae
- Clade: Tracheophytes
- Clade: Angiosperms
- Clade: Eudicots
- Clade: Rosids
- Order: Myrtales
- Family: Myrtaceae
- Genus: Syncarpia
- Species: S. hillii

Binomial name
- Syncarpia hillii F.M.Bailey

= Syncarpia hillii =

Species of tree

Syncarpia hillii is a tree of the family Myrtaceae which grows on K'gari (Fraser Island), Queensland, and the surrounding Cooloola area. Common names for this species are satinay and Fraser Island turpentine. Large examples of this tree may be seen growing at the 'Central Station' picnic area on Fraser Island. A small plot of these trees has also been found on Moreton Island growing in a gully behind Mt Tempest.

The tree can grow to 40 metres tall, and the trunk may reach one metre in diameter.

It has been long regarded as a very valuable timber resource, being particularly useful for marine pylons. It is fire and termite resistant. However, supply is limited. Satinay timber was used as mooring posts in the Suez Canal. Resin from the sap has proven useful in treating chronic ulcers.

The Aboriginal word for this species is "peebang". Rollo Petrie, grandson of Tom Petrie, who grew up on K'gari and learned the language of the forest, calls it the peebang tree in his memoir, Early Days on Fraser Island, 1913 to 1922. He states, "I have a peebang tree. It is my childhood belong me tree. It is over a thousand years old. I want my ashes scattered at its base. It is now 17.5 feet in circumference. So far it has escaped the axe. If it is cut down I shall die, but I will sing the "Kgari Spirit Song" so all Kgari desecrators will perish" (Roll Petrie, August 1990, taken from his "Nomination of the Great Sandy Region for World Heritage" listing (an unpublished paper).
