= Lake McKenzie =

Perched lake on Fraser Island, Queensland, Australia

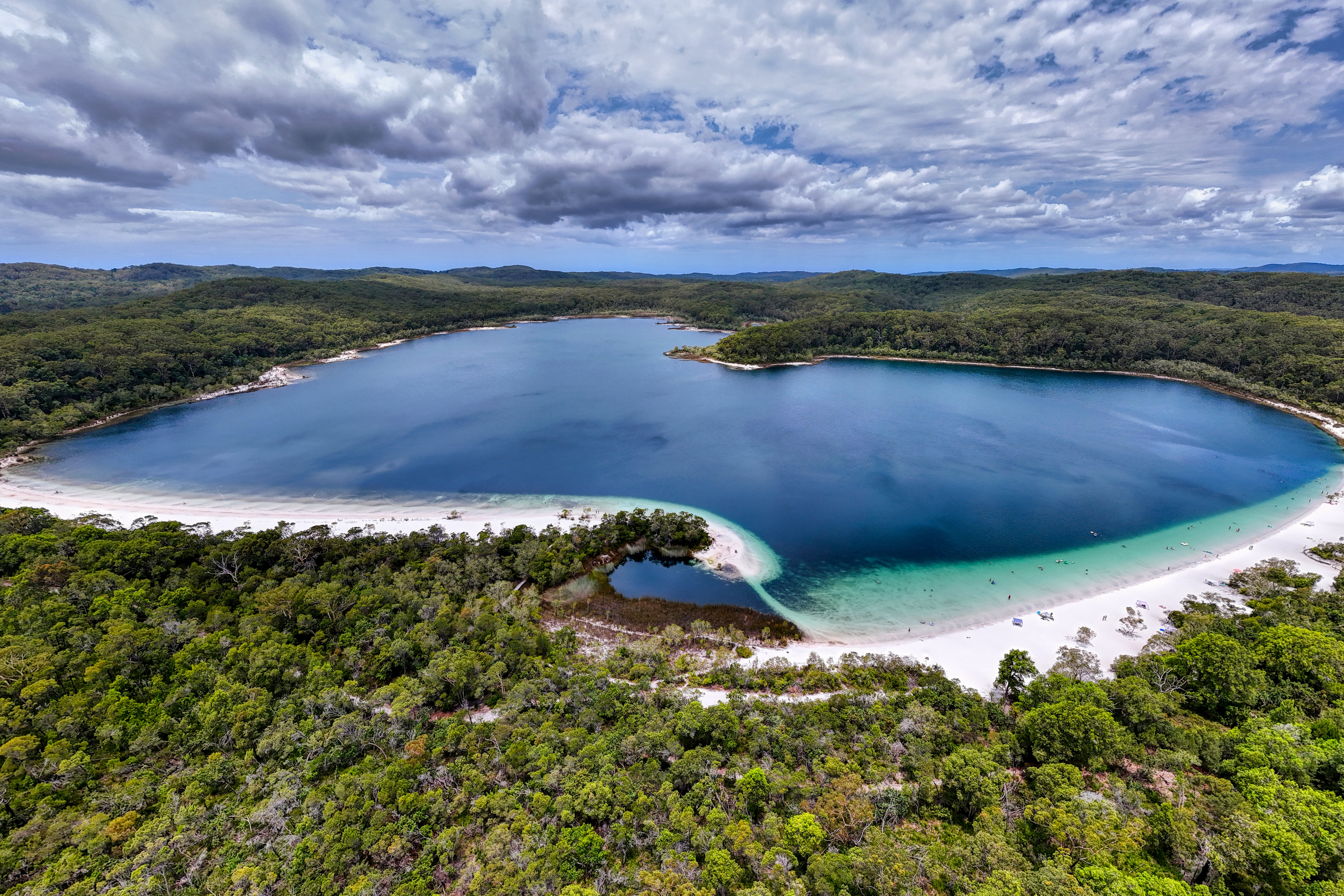

- Location within Queensland
- Location: Fraser Island
- Coordinates: 25°26′45″S 153°03′25″E
- Type: Perched
- Basin countries: Australia
- Managing agency: Department of National Parks, Recreation, Sport and Racing
- Max. length: 1,200 metres (3,900 ft)
- Max. width: 930 metres (3,050 ft)
- Surface area: 80 ha (200 acres)
- Average depth: 6.6 metres (22 ft)
- Surface elevation: 100 metres (330 ft)

Lake McKenzie (Boorangoora) is a perched lake on K'gari or Fraser Island in Queensland, Australia. The lake is located in the Great Sandy National Park.

The lake is located 6.2 km southeast of Kingfisher Resort. It is 1,200 metres long and up to 930 metres wide. It is approximately 80 hectares (200 acres) in area.

The sands around the lake are composed of pure, white silica and the water in the lake is also so pure it is unsuitable for many species.

Facilities for visitors around the lake include picnic areas as well as toilets.

== History ==
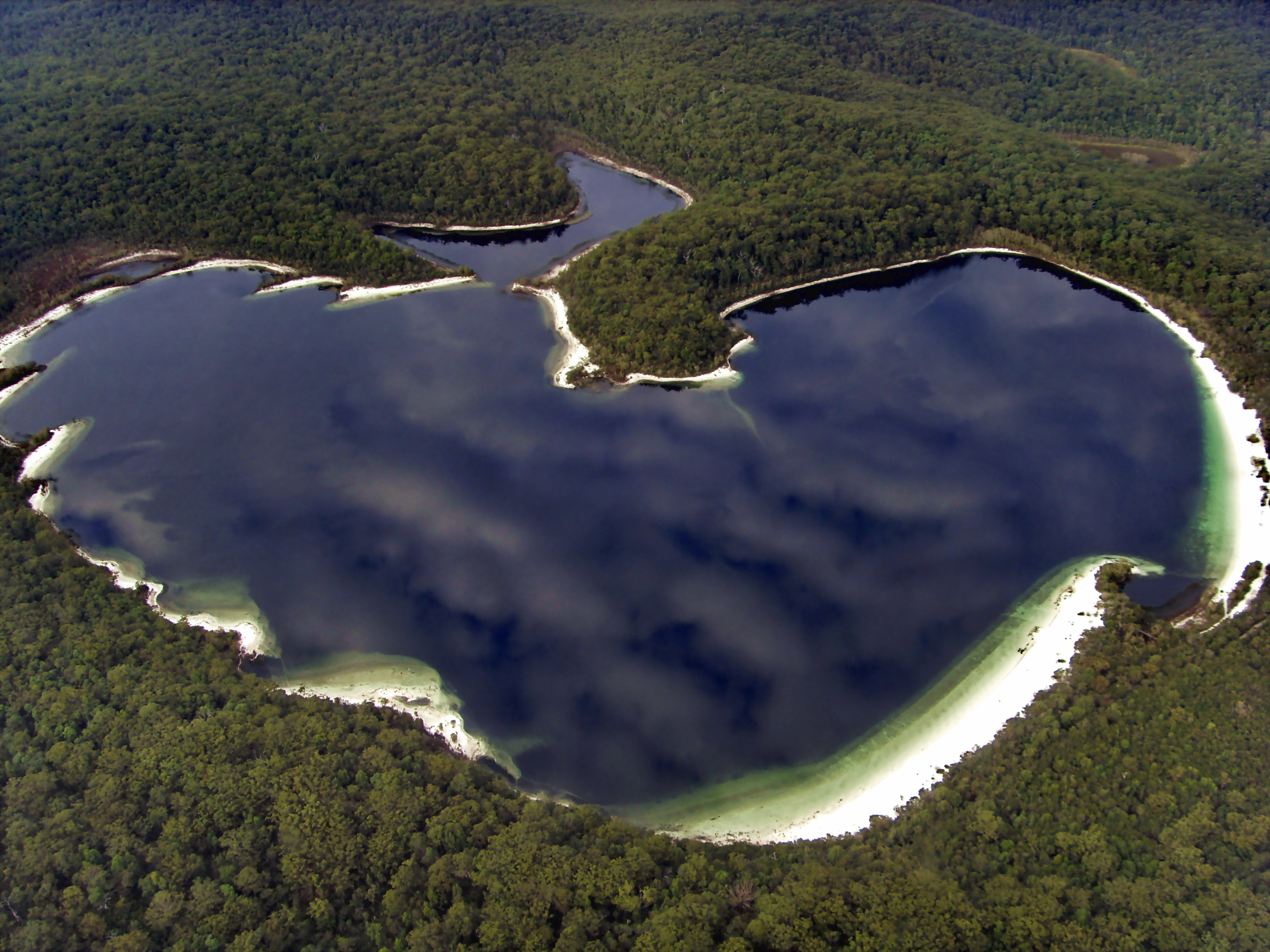
Aerial view, 2008

In March 1944 a training camp, the second on the island during World War II, was established at the lake. It was closed late the same year.

The lake served as the location of the final Roadblock and the Finish Line of the reality competition series The Amazing Race Australia 2.

Prince Harry, Duke of Sussex visited the lake in October 2018 where he viewed a Welcome to Country ceremony.

== See also ==
- List of lakes of Australia
