= Happy Valley =

Happy Valley may refer to:

== Places ==
=== American Samoa ===
- Happy Valley, American Samoa, a residential area in Pago Pago

=== Antarctica ===
- Happy Valley, Antarctica, a valley in the Behrendt Mountains, Ellsworth Land

=== Australia ===
- Happy Valley, New South Wales
- Happy Valley, Queensland (Fraser Island), a town in the Fraser Coast Region, Queensland
- Happy Valley, Queensland (Mount Isa), a suburb in Mount Isa, Queensland
- Happy Valley, South Australia
- Happy Valley, Victoria (Golden Plains Shire)
- Happy Valley, Victoria
- Happy Valley, Western Australia, in the Millbrook State Forest
- City of Happy Valley, a local government area in South Australia from 1935 to 1997
- City of Happy Valley, Noarlunga and Willunga, a former name of City of Onkaparinga, South Australia

=== Canada ===
- Happy Valley, British Columbia
- Happy Valley, Greater Sudbury, Ontario, a ghost town
- Happy Valley Forest, in King, Ontario
  - Happy Valley, King, Ontario, a community within the forest
- Happy Valley-Goose Bay, Newfoundland and Labrador
- Rural Municipality of Happy Valley No. 10, Saskatchewan

=== China ===
Hong Kong is listed separately.

- Happy Valley (amusement parks), a chain of theme parks, including a list of the eight parks
- Happy Valley (Guangzhou), a shopping mall in Guangzhou
- Happy Valley, the nickname of the 1940s Sino-American Cooperative Organization headquarters near Chongqing

=== Germany ===
- Happy Valley, a nickname for Hoppstädten-Weiersbach Airfield in Germany
- Happy Valley, an ironic nickname used by RAF bomber crews during World War II for the Ruhr; see Battle of the Ruhr

=== Hong Kong ===
- Happy Valley, Hong Kong, an upper-income residential area on Hong Kong Island
  - Happy Valley Racecourse, a horse-racing course and tourist attraction

=== India ===
- Happy Valley, Shillong, Meghalaya
- Happy Valley, Mussoorie, Uttarakhand

=== Kenya ===
- Happy Valley, Kenya, a region of the Wanjohi Valley in colonial British Kenya

=== New Zealand ===
- Happy Valley, Wellington
- Happy Valley, West Coast; see Save Happy Valley Coalition
- Happy Valley, a beginner's area at Whakapapa skifield

=== United Kingdom ===
- Happy Valley (garden), in Orkney, Scotland
- Happy Valley Park, Coulsdon, London
- A landmark in Stockport
- Bollington, Cheshire, nicknamed "Happy Valley"
- An area on the side of the Great Orme in Llandudno, North Wales
- Calder Valley in Yorkshire, England, so nicknamed based on its drug problem; see Happy Valley (TV series) § Production

=== United States ===
- Happy Valley, Alaska
- Happy Valley, Calaveras County, California
- Happy Valley, Plumas County, California
- Happy Valley, Kentucky
- Happy Valley, New Mexico
- Happy Valley, Oregon
- Happy Valley (Pennsylvania), a region of Centre County
- Happy Valley, Tennessee (disambiguation)
- State College, Pennsylvania, nicknamed "Happy Valley"
- Utah County, Utah, nicknamed "Happy Valley"
- Pioneer Valley, Massachusetts, nicknamed "Happy Valley"
- Happy Valley Wildlife Management Area, in Oswego County, New York; part of the New York State Wildlife Management Areas

=== Vietnam ===
- Happy Valley, Vietnam

== Arts, entertainment, and media ==
- Camp Happy Valley, a Girl Scout camp in Fairfield, Pennsylvania
- Happy Valley, a setting in the 1947 film segment Mickey and the Beanstalk
- Happy Valley, a 1952 Terrytoons animated short film
- Happy Valley (film), a 2014 documentary film about the Penn State child sex abuse scandal
- Happy Valley (novel), 1939, by Patrick White
- Happy Valley (TV series), a BBC One drama series broadcast in 2014, 2016 and 2023
- The Happy Valley, a 1987 TV film set in 1930s Kenya, about the murder of Lord Erroll
- "Happy Valley", a composition by Vanessa-Mae from her album China Girl: The Classical Album 2 (1997)
- The setting of The History of Rasselas, Prince of Abissinia by Samuel Johnson, published in 1759
- Happy Valley, a Mars colony in Melas Chasma in the TV series For All Mankind

== Education ==
- Happy Valley Elementary School District, Santa Cruz County, California, US
- Happy Valley Union Elementary School District, Santa Cruz County, California, US

== Sports ==
- Happy Valley AA, an association football team based in Hong Kong
- Happy Valley Football Club, South Australia
- Happy Valley Racecourse, a racecourse for horse racing in Hong Kong

== Other uses ==
- Happy Valley (constituency), in the Wan Chai District of Hong Kong
- Happy Valley Reservoir, a water reservoir in Adelaide, Australia
- Happy Valley set, a notorious group of British expatriates living in Kenya's Happy Valley during the 1920s-1940s
- Happy Valley Tea Estate, a tea garden in Darjeeling district, West Bengal, India
- Happy Valley, a chain of regional amusement parks in China owned by Overseas Chinese Town Enterprises

== See also ==
- Happy Valley station (disambiguation)
- Happy Valley-Goose Bay, a town in Newfoundland and Labrador, Canada
