= Happy Valley, California =

Happy Valley, California may refer to:

- Happy Valley, Alameda County, California
- Happy Valley, Calaveras County, California
- Happy Valley, Los Angeles County, California
- Happy Valley, Plumas County, California
- Happy Valley, Santa Cruz County, California
- Happy Valley, Shasta County, California
