= Happy Valley, Queensland =

Happy Valley may refer to:

- Happy Valley, Queensland (Fraser Island), a town on K'gari
- Happy Valley, Queensland (Mount Isa), a suburb in Mount Isa
