= Eurong, Queensland =

Eurong
- Town
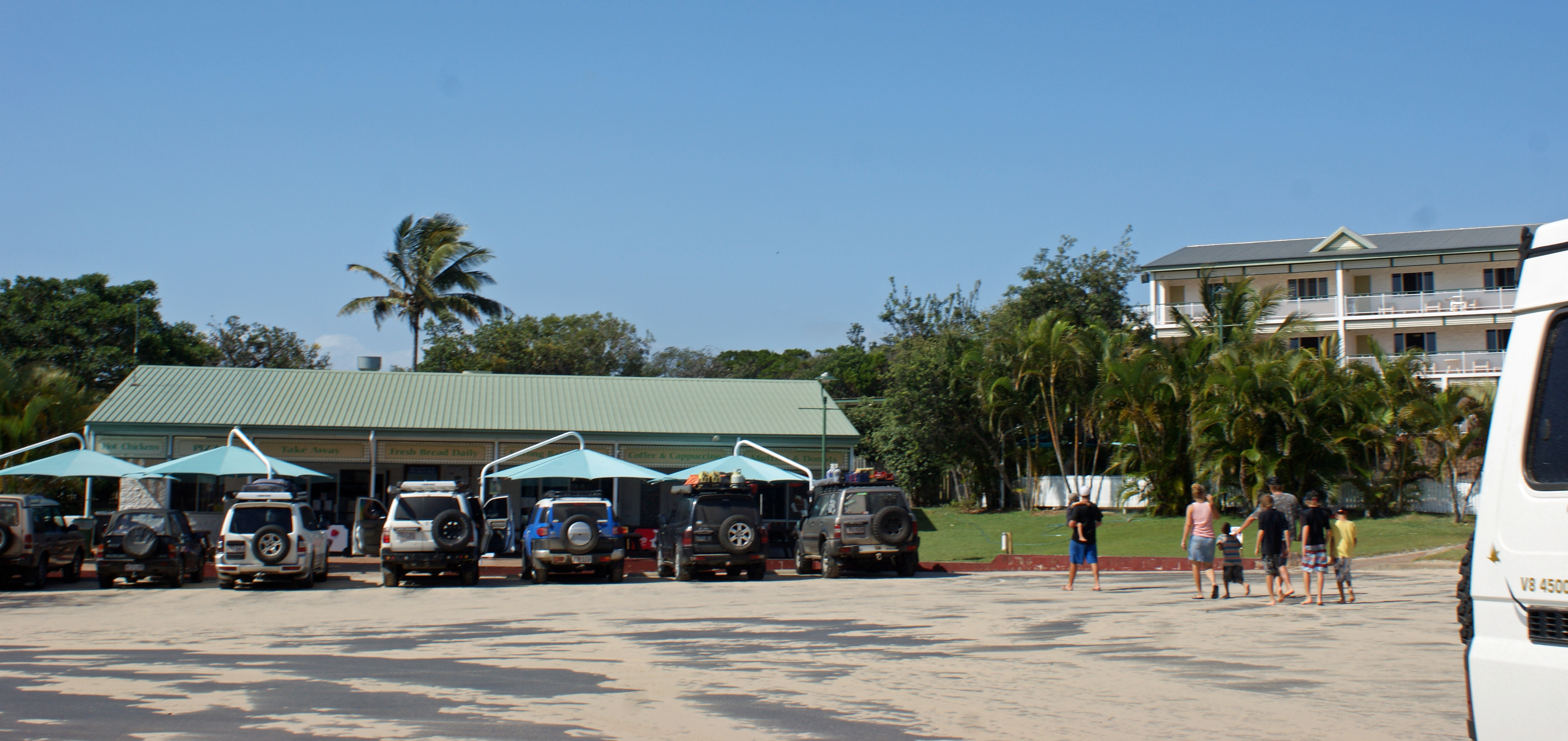
- Shop at Eurong, 2013

- Interactive map of Eurong
- Coordinates: 25.5113°S 153.1261°E
- Country: Australia
- State: Queensland
- LGA: Fraser Coast Region

Government
  - State electorate: Hervey Bay
  - Federal division: Wide Bay

Area
  - Total: 2.9 km^{2} (1.1 sq mi)

Population
  - Total: 11 (2021 census)
  - Density: 3.79/km^{2} (9.8/sq mi)
- Time zone: UTC+10:00 (AEST)
- Postcode: 4581
Localities around Eurong
K'gari (locality)	K'gari (locality)	Coral Sea
K'gari (locality)	Eurong	Coral Sea
K'gari (locality)	K'gari (locality)	Coral Sea

Eurong is an island town and a locality on K'gari (formerly known as Fraser Island) in the Fraser Coast Region, Queensland, Australia. In the 2021 census, the locality of Eurong had a population of 11 people.

== Geography ==
The island of K'gari is divided into two localities, one very small one, Eurong, and very large one called K'gari (the locality not the island, with Happy Valley its only town). Eurong is on the east coast of K'gari facing the Coral Sea about one quarter of the length of the island from its southern tip. Consequently, on the land, Eurong is completely surrounded by the locality of K'gari.

The coastline of Eurong is approx 2.48 kilometres (1.54 mi) of the Seventy Five Mile Beach which extends to the north and south beyond Eurong. The town of Eurong is immediately west of the beach.

== History ==
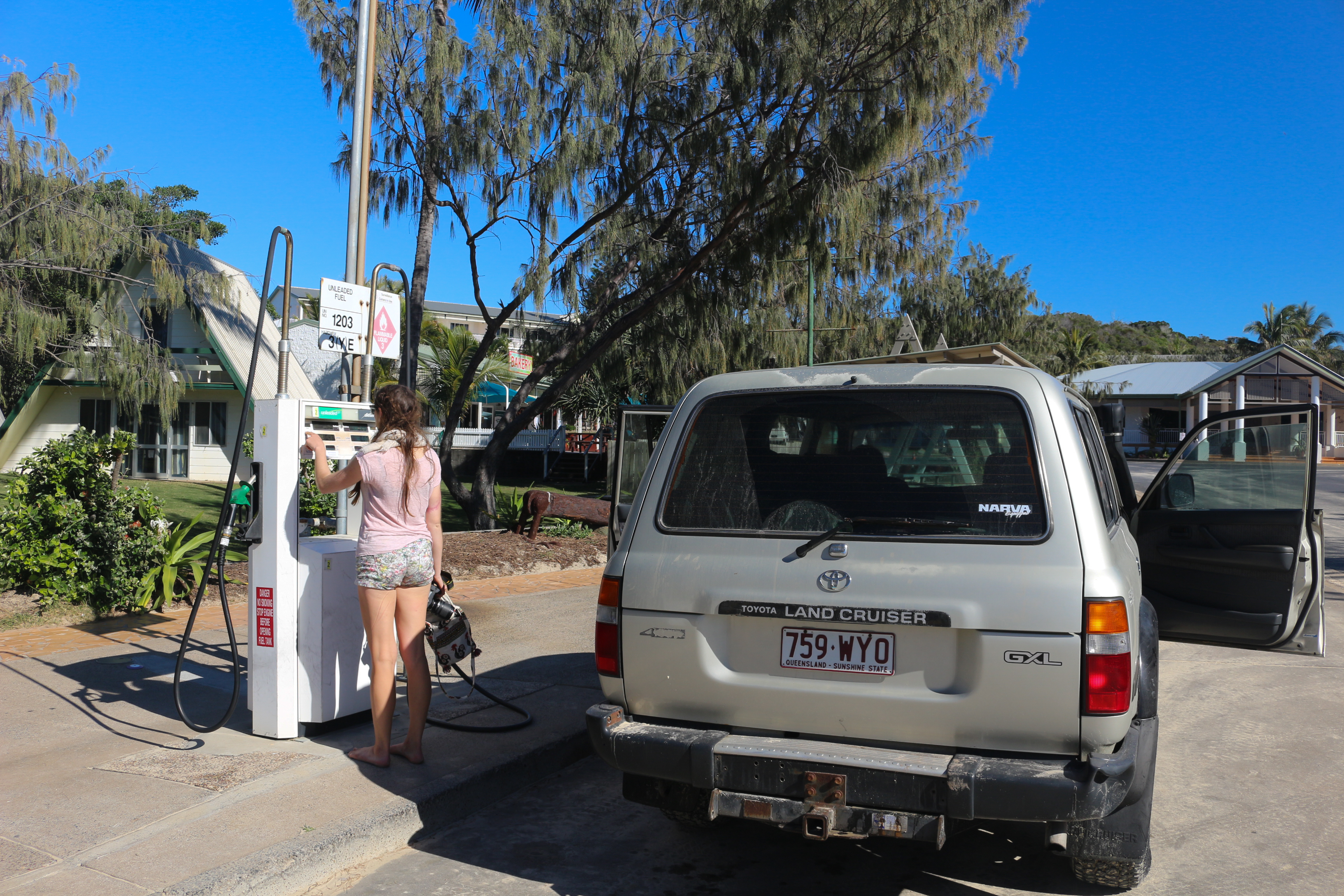
A petrol station in Eurong, often used by daily visitors as it is one of the rare stations on the island

The name Eurong is believed to be a Kabi language word meaning rain forest.

Timbergetting was the first industry in the area. By 1927, there was a settlement of forestry workers and their families (approximately 50 people) in the Eurong area. It was a very isolated settlement with a fortnightly steamer service to go to Maryborough for the weekend for shopping; apart from there was no communication or transport from Eurong. The housing was primitive, often not weatherproof in the rain. However, there was an excellent water supply from the creek.

By 1937, the settlement had developed and included a dance hall. Groups of people started to come from Maryborough and Pialba to Eurong for sightseeing, swimming, picnicking, and dancing, the beginning of the tourist industry that exists today.

== Demographics ==
Eurong is a tourist destination with a range of holiday accommodation. However, the Australian census only counts those people who claim the locality to be their "usual residence".

In the 2016 census, the locality of Eurong had a population of 47 people.

In the 2021 census, the locality of Eurong had a population of 11 people.

== Education ==
There are no schools in Eurong, nor anywhere else on the island. The alternatives are distance education and boarding school.
