= Mount Tepatasi =

Mountain in American Sāmoa

Coordinates: 14°16′40″S 170°42′05″W

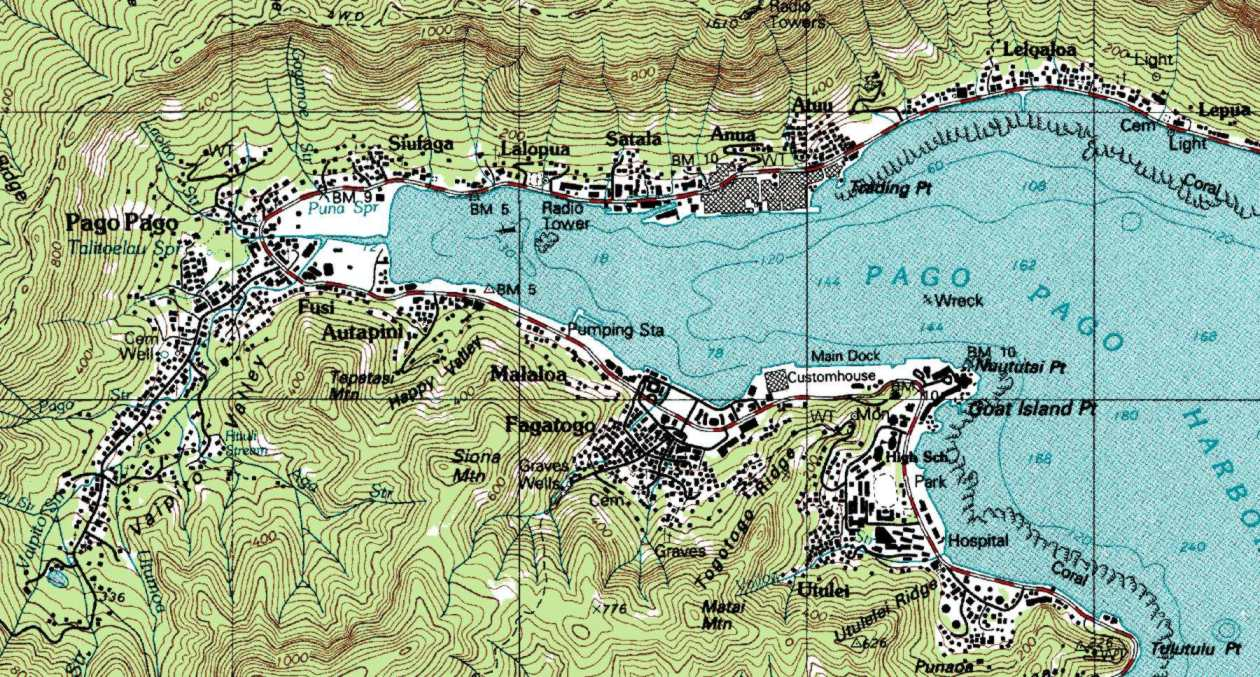
Map of Pago Pago

Mount Tepatasi is a 203-meter (666-foot) mountain situated near Happy Valley in Pago Pago, the capital of American Sāmoa. It is part of the mountainous terrain that surrounds and protects Pago Pago Harbor, one of the most notable natural harbors in the Pacific. The village of Pago Pago is nestled amidst a range of tall peaks, including Mount Tepatasi and other prominent mountains such as Mount Matafao (2,142 ft), Rainmaker Mountain (1,716 ft), Mount ʻAlava (1,611 ft), Mount Siona (892 ft), and Mount Matai (850 ft).
