= Happy Valley, Tennessee =

Happy Valley is or has been the name of several places in Tennessee, including:

- Happy Valley, Blount County, Tennessee, unincorporated community near the Great Smoky Mountains National Park, associated with ZIP code 37878
- Happy Valley, Carter County, Tennessee, in Elizabethton and adjacent Carter County
- Happy Valley, Oak Ridge, Tennessee, a Manhattan Project construction camp; no longer in existence

== See also ==
- Happy Valley (disambiguation)
