= K'gari, Queensland =

K'gari
- Town
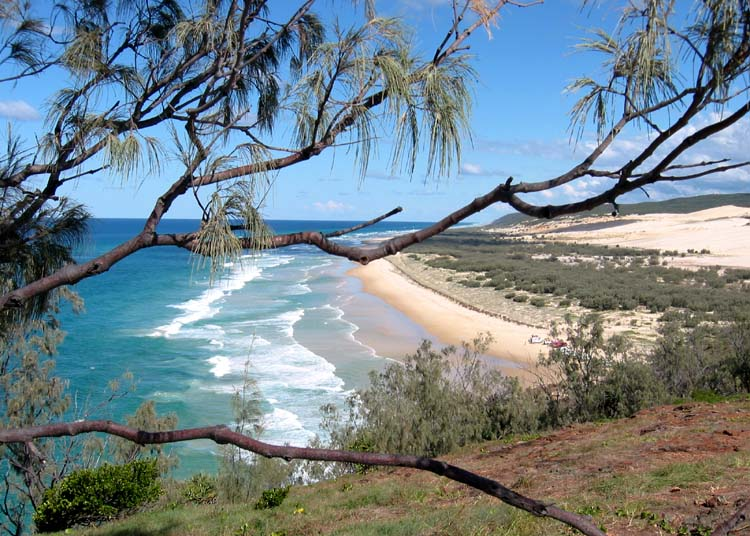
- 75 Mile Beach, 2006

- Interactive map of K'gari
- Coordinates: 25.2497°S 153.1663°E
- Country: Australia
- State: Queensland
- LGA: Fraser Coast Region

Government
  - State electorate: Hervey Bay
  - Federal division: Wide Bay

Area
  - Total: 1,655.0 km^{2} (639.0 sq mi)

Population
  - Total: 152 (2021 census)
  - Density: 0.09184/km^{2} (0.2379/sq mi)
- Time zone: UTC+10:00 (AEST)
- Postcode: 4581
Localities around K'gari
Hervey Bay	Coral Sea	Coral Sea
Great Sandy Strait	K'gari	Eurong
Great Sandy Strait	Great Sandy Strait	Coral Sea

K'gari (/ˈɡɑːri/ GAH-ree, lit. 'Paradise' in Batjala) is a locality on the island of the same name in the Fraser Coast Region, Queensland, Australia. The island of K'gari (previously known as Fraser Island) is divided into two localities, the K'gari locality consisting of most of the land, and the locality of Eurong on the east coast of the island.

In the 2021 census, the locality then known as Fraser Island (but not the island as a whole) had a population of 152 people.

== History ==
Sandy Cape Provisional School opened circa 1874 and closed circa 1915.

Wungoolba State School opened in 1920 and closed circa 1921.

North White Cliffs State School opened in 1921 and closed in 1925.

Fraser Island Provisional School opened on 13 July 1937 and closed in 1941.

The locality, comprising most but not all of the land on the island of K'gari, then called Fraser Island, was created in the Fraser Coast Region in Queensland.

On 7 June 2023, both the island and the locality were officially renamed K'gari.

== Geography ==
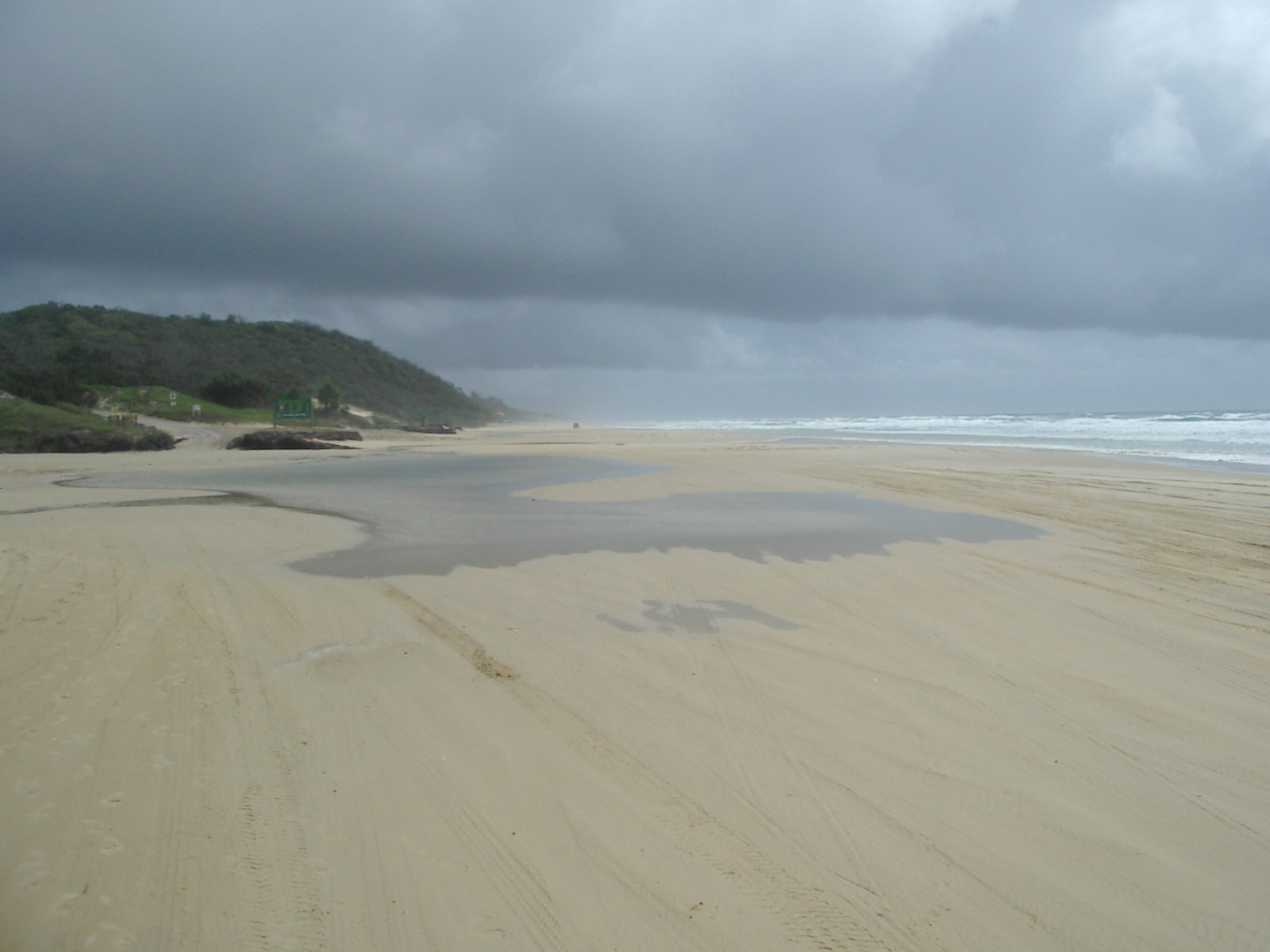
Happy Valley, 2004

The island of K'gari (previously known as Fraser Island) is divided into two localities: the K'gari locality, consisting of most of the land, and the locality of Eurong on the east coast of the island.

Almost all of the K'gari locality is within the Great Sandy National Park except for isolated pockets of development at Orchid Beach, Maheno Beach, Happy Valley, Dilli Village, Kingfisher Bay Resort and near Moon Point. Happy Valley is the only town in the locality, (25.3375°S 153.2005°E), located on the east coast of the locality, north of Eurong.

=== Mountains and valleys ===
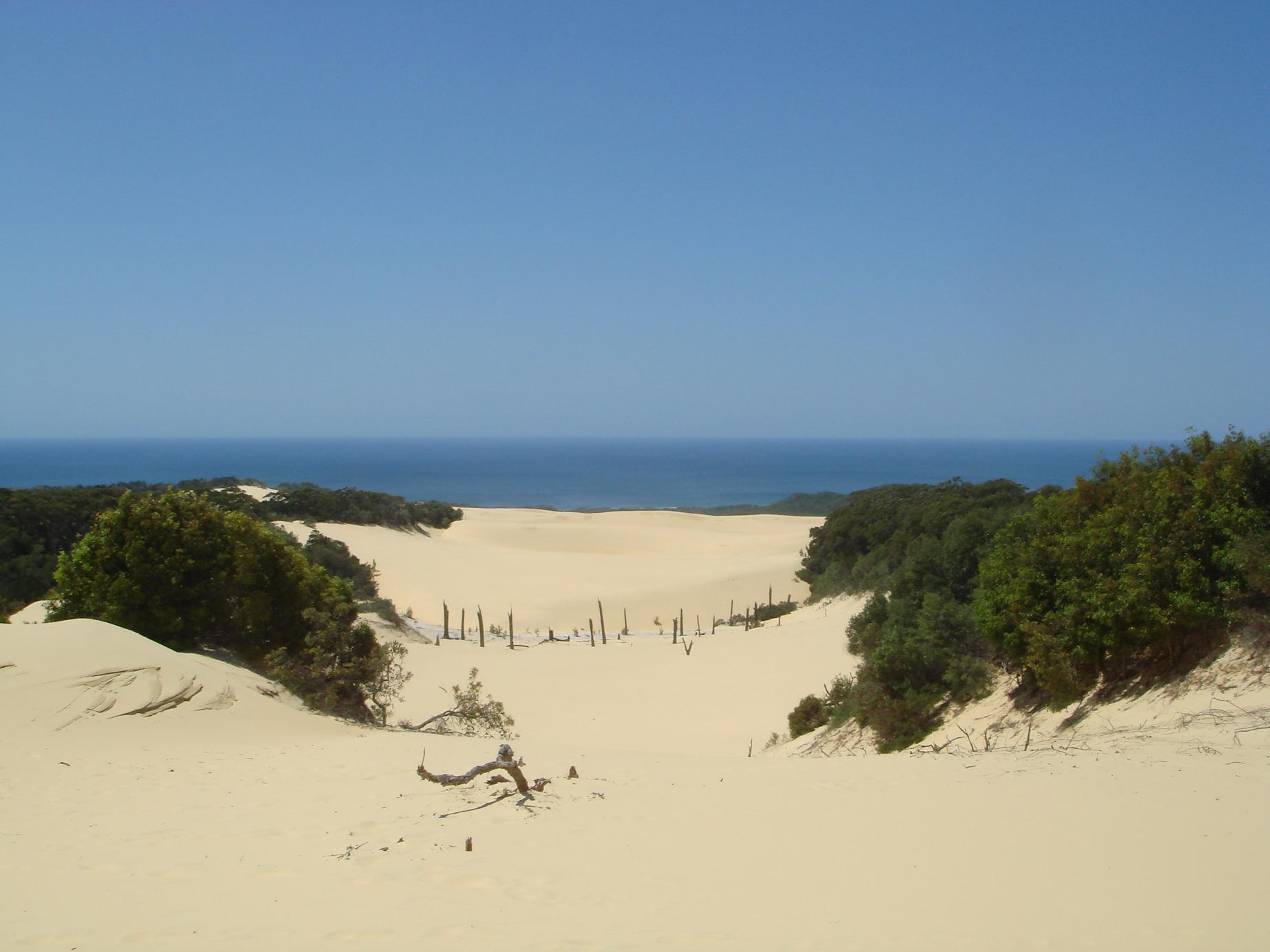
Badjala Sand Blow, 2007

The K'gari locality has the following mountains, sand dunes, and valleys:

- Anvilstone Sand Blow, a dune (25.2811°S 153.225°E), named for the specimens of stones that were used in the preparation of Aboriginal food
- Badjala Sand Blow, a dune (25.4225°S 153.1513°E), named for the Aboriginal clan which occupied the central section of the island
- Ban'ga Sand Blow, a dune (25.3416°S 153.1836°E), named using the Badtjala language word meaning Zamia
- Ba'pun Sand Blow, a dune (24.7533°S 153.2425°E), named using the Badtjala language word meaning moon
- Bare Hill (24.8292°S 153.2377°E) 92 metres (302 ft)
- Beemeer Sand Blow, a dune (25.1891°S 153.2444°E)
- Beerall Sand Blow, a dune (25.2975°S 153.2116°E), named using the Butchulla language, meaning God of the Butchulla People
- Bimjella Hill (25.1249°S 153.1643°E)
- Binngih Sand Blow, a dune (24.9719°S 153.3458°E), named using the Badtjala language name for Waddy Point
- Birre Sand Blow, a dune (24.7941°S 153.2105°E), named using the Butchulla language word meaning hand
- Boomanjin Hill, formerly Mount Boemingen (25.5249°S 153.0439°E) 277 metres (909 ft)
- Burrgum Hill, formerly Boomerang Hill (25.2769°S 153.1885°E) 235 metres (771 ft)
- Buwan Sand Blow, a dune (24.84°S 153.2369°E), named using the Butchulla language word meaning sleepy
- Carree Sand Blow, a dune (24.7319°S 153.2408°E), named using the Badtjala language for the Sandy Cape area
- Carroor Sand Blow, a dune (25.3088°S 153.2116°E)
- Dhu'lar Hill (25.4844°S 153.0541°E), named using the Badtjala language meaning blackbutt tree
- Di'bing Sand Blow, a dune (24.86°S 153.2561°E), named using the Badtjala language meaning mosquito
- Diray Sand Blow, a dune (24.7844°S 153.2522°E), named using the Butchulla language meaning star
- Duling Sand Blow, a dune (24.8863°S 153.2594°E), named using the Badtjala language meaning shell necklace or shell for making ornaments
- Dulingbara Sand Blow, a dune (25.4561°S 153.1372°E), named for the Aboriginal clan which occupied the southern section of Fraser Island and part of the Cooloola Coast, meaning people of the nautilus shell ornament
- Flinders Sand Blow, a dune (24.72°S 153.2119°E), named as the landing site of Matthew Flinders in 1802
- Ganay Sand Blow, a dune (25.1094°S 153.3013°E), named using the Butchulla language, meaning long heavy spear made from split hardwood
- Gandus Sand Blow, a dune (24.9380°S 153.2869°E), named using the Badtjala language, meaning children
- Gira Sand Blow, a dune (25.2691°S 153.2202°E), named using the Butchulla language, meaning fire
- Guluri Sand Blow, a dune (25.3219°S 153.1997°E), named using the Butchulla language, meaning canoe
- Gumari Sand Blow, a dune (25.2891°S 153.2194°E), named using the Butchulla language, meaning shield
- Hammerstone Sand Blow, a dune (25.4644°S 153.1430°E), named after specimens of the Aboriginal hammerstones discovered on Fraser Island
- Jun Jaree Sand Blow, a dune (25.2991°S 153.2061°E), named using the Butchulla language, meaning fairy or pixie
- Kirrar Sand Blow, a dune (25.3630°S 153.1808°E), named using the Badtjala language word Kir'a, meaning fire
- Knifeblade Sand Blow, a dune (25.2394°S 153.2311°E), named for the specimens of small Aboriginal tools found there
- Koorooman Sand Blow, a dune (25.175°S 153.2677°E), named using the Badtjala language, meaning kangaroo
- Kooroy Sand Blow, a dune (25.4188°S 153.1622°E), named using the Badtjala language, meaning opossum
- Leading Hill (25.3940°S 153.0847°E) 185 metres (607 ft)
- Markwells Spur, a ridge (25.5333°S 153.1°E)
- Marong Ridge, a ridge, formerly Mount Marong (24.7833°S 153.1833°E)
- Milung Sand Blow, a dune (25.3330°S 153.1855°E), named using the Butchulla language word, meaning evil spirit
- Ngiya Sand Blow, a dune (25.7725°S 153.0813°E), named using the Badtjala language word, meaning sand
- Ngulungbara Sand Blow, a dune (24.8691°S 153.2527°E), named after an Aboriginal clan which occupied the northern section of the island
- Nulwarr Hill (25.4482°S 153.1282°E) 116 metres (381 ft)
- Pine Hill (25.2632°S 153.1561°E)
- Quartztool Sand Blow, a dune (25.295°S 153.2172°E), named after the specimens of Aboriginal tools made from quartz pebbles found there
- Poyungan Hill (25.3520°S 153.1008°E)
- Station Hill (24.8490°S 153.1896°E)
- Poyungan Valley (25.3920°S 153.1727°E)
- Rainbow Gorge (25.3717°S 153.1813°E)
- Stonetool Sand Blow, a dune (25.4388°S 153.1461°E), named after the specimens of the most complete undisturbed Aboriginal campsite found there
- The Bluff, a mountain (25.7700°S 153.0192°E) 63 metres (207 ft)
- Tuk'ka Sand Blow, a dune (25.2241°S 153.2408°E), named using the Badtjala language word, meaning grass tree
- Tukkee Sand Blow, a dune (25.0227°S 153.3477°E), named using the Badtjala language name for Indian Head
- Waddy, a hill (24.95°S 153.2833°E)
- Warbu Sand Blow, a dune (25.4769°S 153.1327°E), named using the Badtjala language word, meaning frog
- Winnam Sand Blow, a dune (25.3722°S 153.1813°E), named using the Butchulla language word, meaning breadfruit
- Wul'lan Sand Blow, a dune (25.3988°S 153.1586°E), named using the Badtjala language word, meaning pretty-faced wallaby
- Wungai Sand Blow, a dune (25.5733°S 153.0769°E), named using the Badtjala language word, meaning carpet snake
- Wun'gul Sand Blow, a dune (25.1536°S 153.2705°E), named using the Badtjala language word, meaning swamp oak tree
- Wurgu Sand Blow, a dune (24.8241°S 153.2486°E), named using the Butchulla language word, meaning east wind.
- Yurru Sand Blow, a dune (25.205°S 153.2480°E), named using the Butchulla language word, meaning fishline, string, or rope

=== Coastal features ===
The locality has the following capes, points, and beaches along its coast:

- Arch Cliff (25.1166°S 153.1333°E)
- Blackfellow Point (25.2768°S 153.0458°E)
- Boonlye Point (25.5668°S 152.9382°E)
- Coongul Point (25.1795°S 153.0305°E)
- Corroboree Beach (25.0899°S 153.3209°E)
- Elbow Point (25.7621°S 153.0113°E)
- Hook Point, also known as Torerr in the Badtjala language (25.7919°S 153.0773°E)
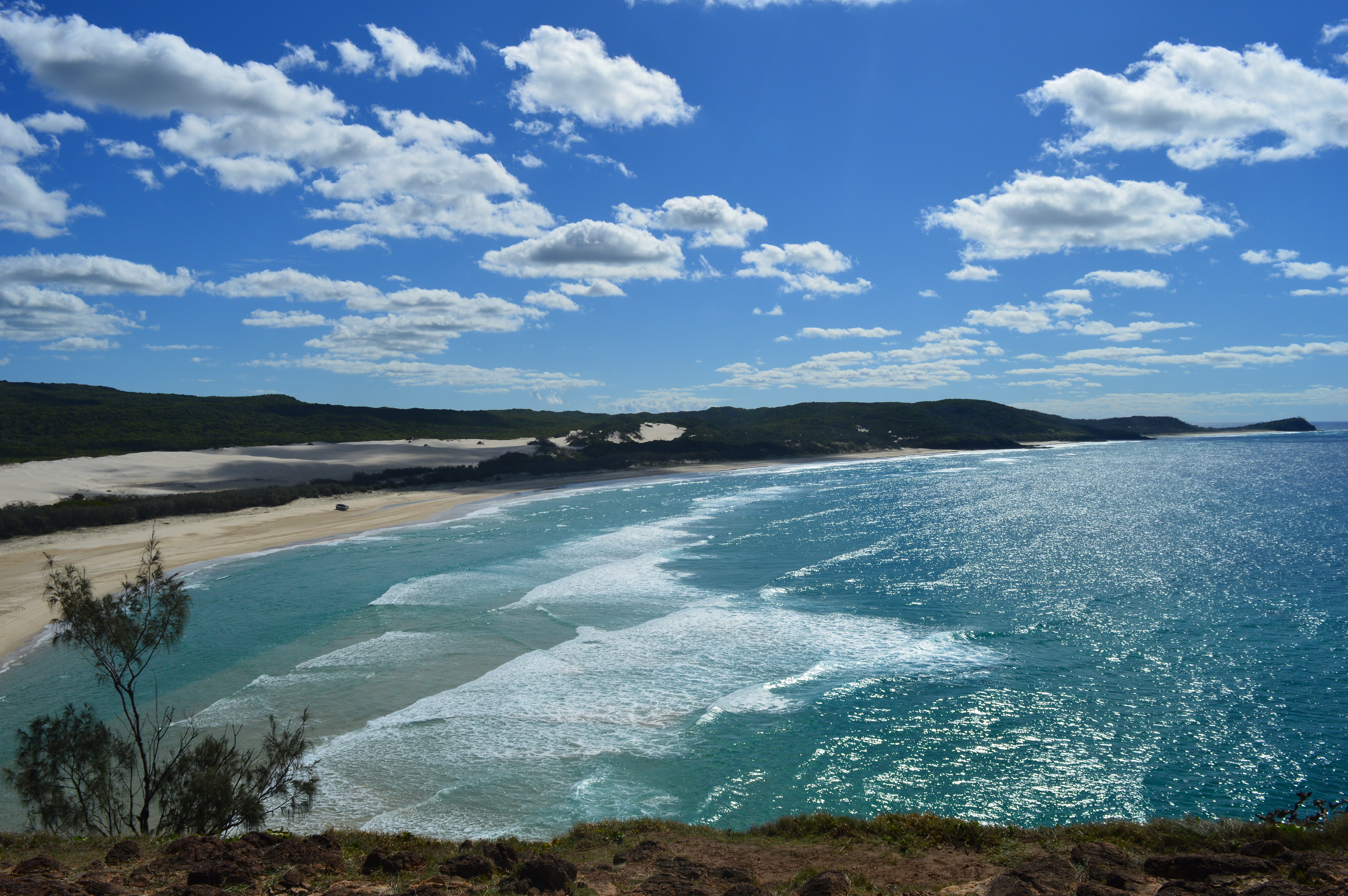
- Looking north towards Indian Head, 2016
  Indian Head (25.0060°S 153.3599°E), named on 20 May 1770 by Lieutenant James Cook of the HM Bark Endeavour because he described it as "...on which a number of Natives were assembled...", also known as Tukkee in the Badtjala language meaning stone or stone knife
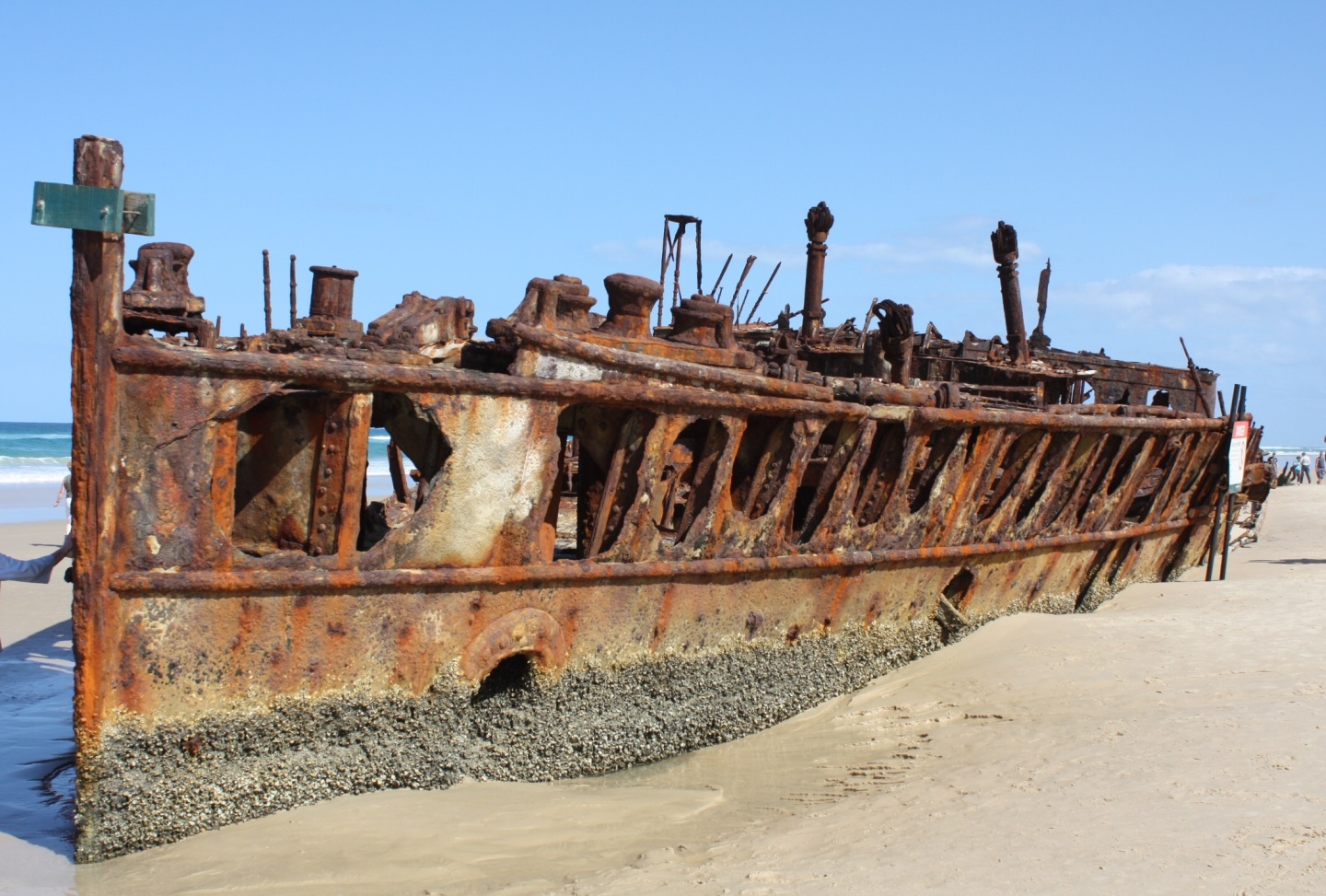
- Wreck of the Maheno, 2010
  Maheno Beach (25.2509°S 153.2458°E), which extends from Eli Creek to The Pinnacles and takes its name from the wreck of the SS Maheno
- Manann Beach (24.7768°S 153.2616°E), the name derives from the Kabi language meaning carrying water
- Moon Point (25.2226°S 152.9941°E)
- North White Cliffs (25.4025°S 153.0168°E)
- Orchid Beach (24.9288°S 153.2864°E), which extends from South Ngkala Rocks to Waddy Point
- Rooney Point (24.8164°S 153.1195°E)
- Sandy Cape, also known as Woakoh (24.6985°S 153.2580°E), named for its physical appearance on 20 May 1770 by Lieutenant James Cook of the HM Bark Endeavour
- Sandy Point (25.2299°S 152.9950°E)
- Seventy Five Mile Beach (25.5395°S 153.1160°E)
- South White Cliffs (25.5°S 152.9877°E)
- Triangle Cliff (25.0284°S 153.2046°E)
- Waddy Point, also known as Minker (24.9659°S 153.3512°E)
- Yathon Cliffs (25.0833°S 153.1666°E)

=== Creeks and lakes ===
There are many creeks and lakes within the locality:

- Akuna Creek (25.085°S 153.314°E)
- Aldridge Creek (25.5559°S 152.9543°E)
- Allom Lake (25.197°S 153.21°E)
- Awinya Creek (25.0692°S 153.1732°E), the name believed to derive from the Kabi language meaning crossing place
- Basin Lake (25.4680°S 153.0430°E)
- Beeliwa Lagoon (25.5641°S 153.0222°E), the name refers to the casuarina tree in the Kabi language
- Bennet Creek (25.4217°S 153.0063°E)
- Biddierr Creek (25.5584°S 152.9541°E), the name is from the Kabi language meaning crab hole.
- Black Creek (25.3°S 153.0666°E)
- Black Lagoon (25.268°S 153.145°E)
- Blowah Lakes (24.8833°S 153.2166°E)
- Boolla Lagoons (24.804°S 153.185°E), the name is from the Kabi language word for two.
- Boomerang Lakes (25.2236°S 153.1333°E)
- Boon Boon Creek, formerly Bun Bun Creek (25.3666°S 153.05°E), the name is from the Kabi language meaning call of the swamp pheasant
- Bowal Creek (25.0333°S 153.2°E)
- Bowarrady Creek (25.1166°S 153.1333°E)
- Bridge Creek (25.5666°S 153.1°E)
- Calarga Lagoon (24.8305°S 153.1944°E), named for the Kabi language word for sparrow hawk
- Coolooloi Creek (25.7666°S 153.0166°E), the name derived from the Kabi language word kululu meaning cypress pine (Callitris columellaris)
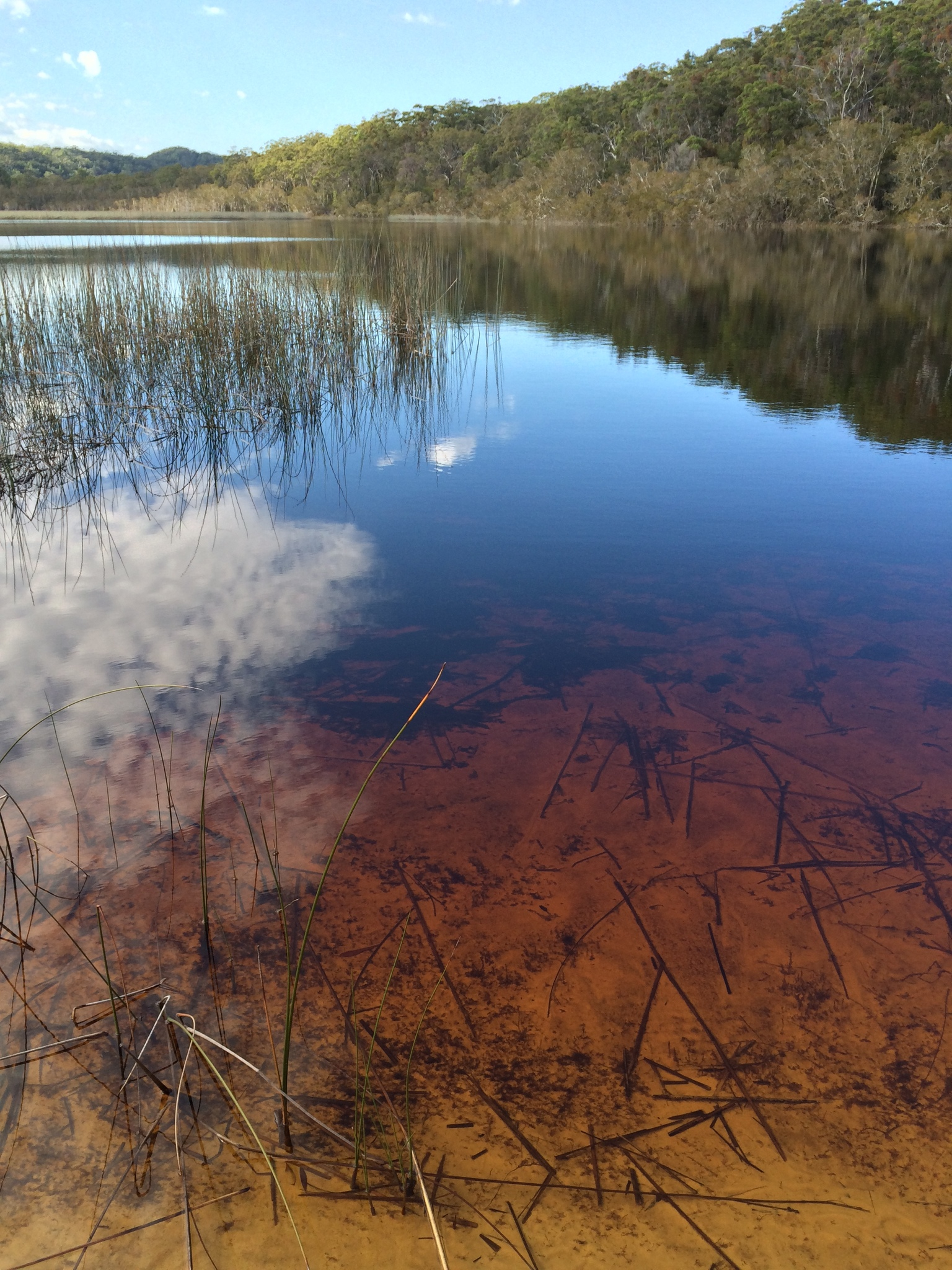
- Midday Reflections on Lake Coomboo, 2014
  Coomboo Lakes (25.224°S 153.169°E)
- Coonangoor Creek (25.6078°S 152.9649°E), the name being the Kabi word for human excreta
- Coondagarramine Creek i(25.25°S 153.0666°E), the name being a Kabi language word in the Badjala dialect meaning shallow water or little water.
- Coongul Creek i(25.1686°S 153.0563°E), believe to be a Kabi language word in the Ngulungbara dialect meaning salt water
- Coonoagarramine Creek (25.25°S 153.05°E)
- Coorong Creek (25.0514°S 153.1871°E), the name referring to the Moreton Bay Pine (Araucaria cunninghamii)
- Cubbih Creek (25.5220°S 152.9741°E), believed to derive from the Kabi language word for honey.
- Cypress Creek (25.5967°S 152.9579°E)
- Deep Creek, also known as Dilgarring Creek (25.5119°S 152.9883°E), the name Dilgarring is believed to be the Kabi language word for the Acacia (wattle) tree
- Deepwater Lake (25.2151°S 153.2152°E)
- Dibing Swamp (25.6011°S 153.0808°E), the name is derived from the Badtjala language, referring to the white flowered tea-tree, variant "Di'bing"
- Duck Creek (25.4322°S 152.9988°E)
- Dundonga Creek, formerly Dungonga Creek (25.3844°S 153.0355°E)
- Dundubara Creek (25.1666°S 153.2833°E), the name being a Kabi language word meaning flies.
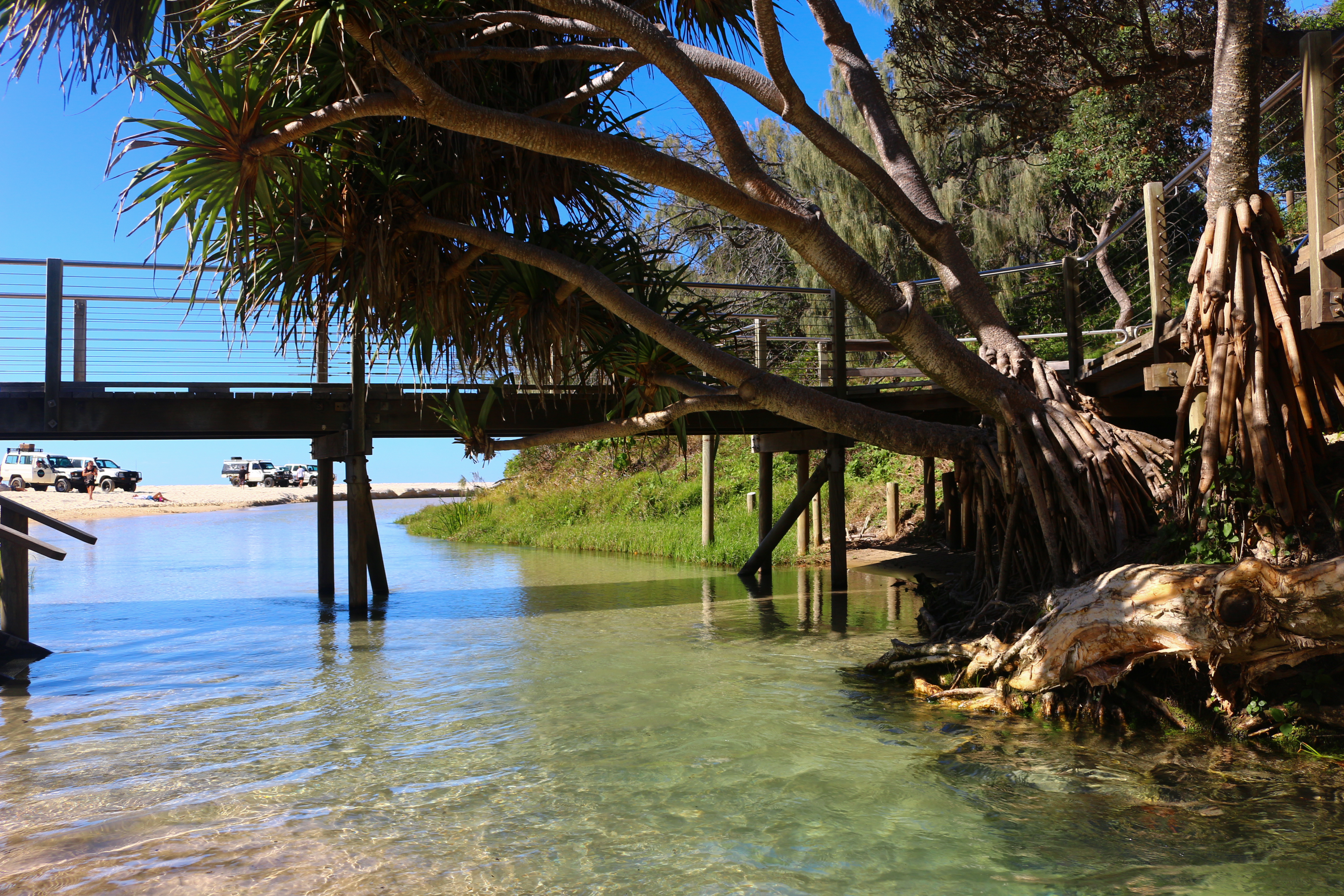
- Bridge over Eli Creek, 2018
  Eli Creek (25.2917°S 153.2256°E)
- Figtree Lake, also known as Lake Goomboor (25.6363°S 153.0172°E), the name Goomboor being the Kabi language word for bald head
- Freshwater Lakes (25.2184°S 153.1958°E)
- Geewan Creek (25.7333°S 153.0000°E)
- Gerowweea Creek, formerly known as First Creek (25.5491°S 153.1111°E), the name derived from Kabi language words meaning flying fox (a type of fruit bat)
- Goochee Lagoon i(24.8511°S 153.2058°E), the name deriving from a Kabi language word meaning sand goanna
- Govi Creek, formerly Second Creek (25.5831°S 153.0991°E), the name deriving from the Kabi language word meaning native bee and honey.
- Happy Valley Creek (25.3333°S 153.2°E)
- Hidden Lake (25.2358°S 153.1702°E)
- Jabiru Swamp (25.7333°S 153.0666°E)
- Kurrnung Creek (25.0995°S 153.3154°E)
- Lake Barga (25.5113°S 153.0558°E), the name believed to derive from Kabi language words meaning come on.
- Lake Benaroon (25.5172°S 153.0555°E), the name believed to be derive from the Kabi language word meaning tight.
- Lake Birrabeen (25.5041°S 153.0552°E)
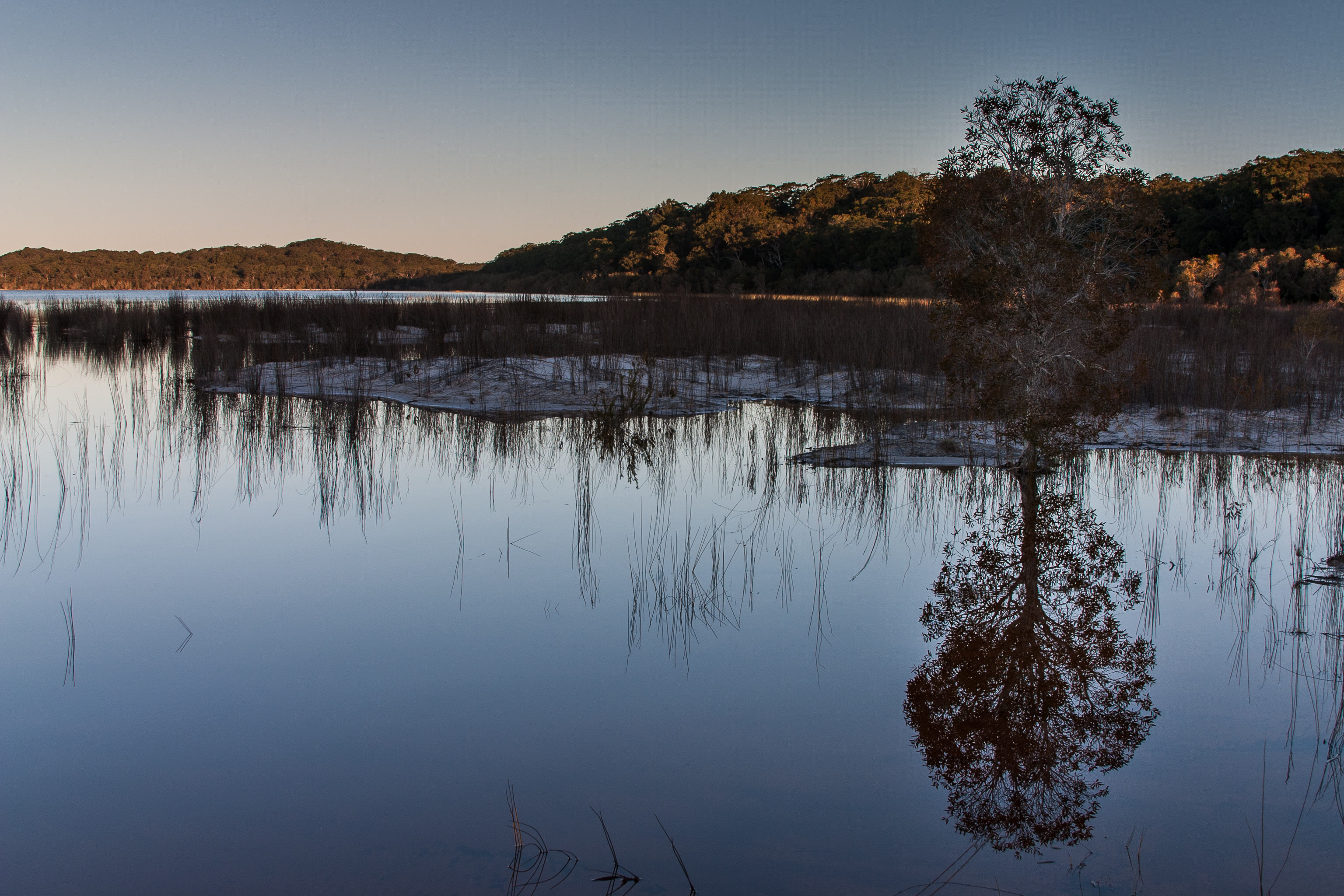
- Lake Boomanjin, 2008
  Lake Boomanjin, formerly Lake Boemingen (25.5544°S 153.0744°E)
- Lake Bowarrady (25.1469°S 153.2111°E)
- Lake Carree (24.87°S 153.2136°E)
- Lake Garawongera (25.3286°S 153.1561°E)
- Lake Garry (25.6188°S 152.9823°E)
- Lake Geeoong (25.1319°S 153.2047°E), the name derived from the Kabi language word meaning white cockatoo
- Lake Gnarann (25.1113°S 153.1925°E), the name derived from the Kabi language words meaning cracked bark
- Lake Jennings (25.4944°S 153.0547°E)
- Lake Marong (24.7833°S 153.1833°E)
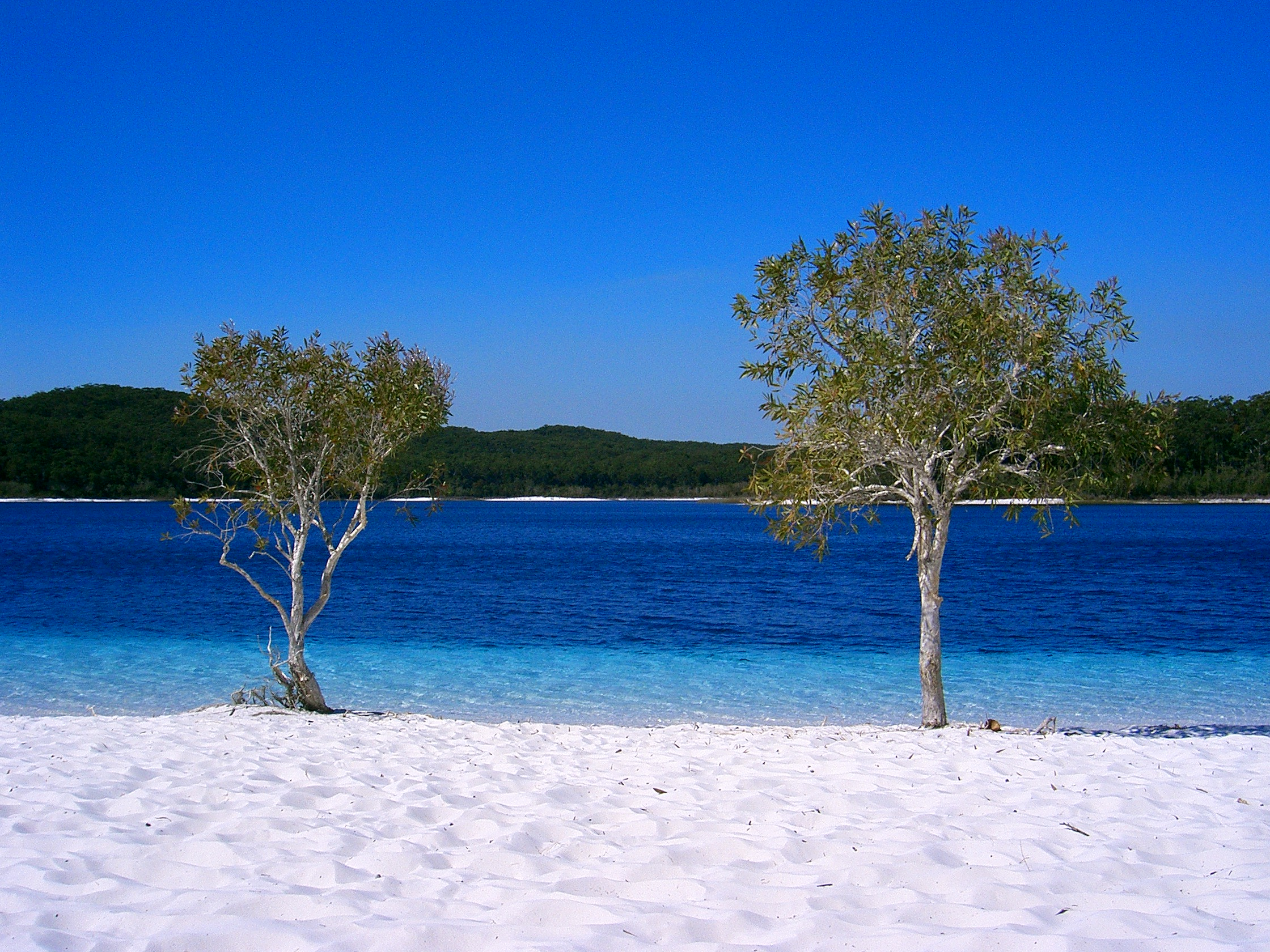
- Lake McKenzie, 2004
  Lake McKenzie, also known as Boorangoora (25.4466°S 153.0575°E)
- Lake Minker (24.8961°S 153.2330°E), the name derived from the Kabi language word meaning forest box tree
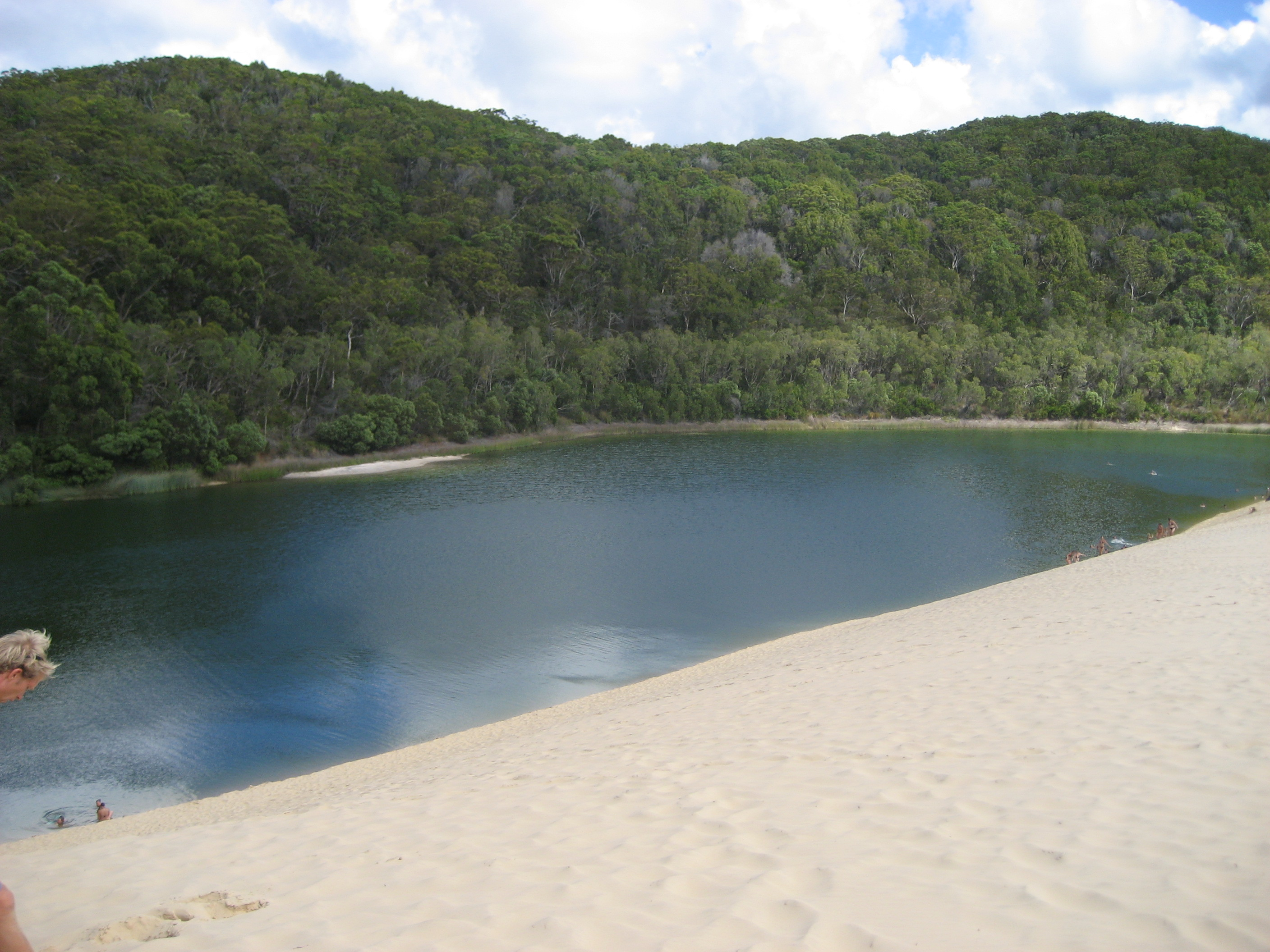
- Lake Wabby, 2007
  Lake Wabby (25.45°S 153.1333°E)
- Lake Wanhar (24.8411°S 153.2302°E)
- Lake White (25.1219°S 153.2052°E)
- Lake Woonjeel (24.8833°S 153.2333°E), the name believed to derive from the Kabi language words meaning dark water or darkness.
- Lake Yeenan (24.8833°S 153.2333°E)
- Manoolcoong Lakes (24.7933°S 153.1887°E), the name believed to derive from the Kabi language words meaning death adder.
- Meereenyoor Creek (25.2166°S 153.0000°E)
- Moondoora Lagoon (24.8566°S 153.2341°E), the name believed to derive from the Kabi language word meaning red ant
- Ngarr Lagoon (24.8961°S 153.2328°E), the name derived from the Kabi language word meaning white ant
- Ocean Lake (24.9333°S 153.2833°E)
- Panama Creek (25.4681°S 152.9849°E)
- Poyungan Creek (25.35°S 153.05°E), the name believed to derive from the Kabi language word for tree grub
- Red Lagoon, also known as Walameboulha (25.5608°S 153.05°E)
- Running Creek (25.2°S 153.2°E)
- Salt Creek (25.1689°S 153.0582°E)
- Semaphore Creek (25.7945°S 153.0710°E)
- Sheep Station Lagoons (25.5833°S 153.05°E)
- Taleerba Creek, formerly Third Creek (25.6166°S 153.0833°E), the name is believed to derive from the Kabi language word meaning small vine
- Tenimby Creek (25.2666°S 153.05°E).
- Thow-wool Lagoon (24.9280°S 153.2427°E), the named believed to derive from the Kabi language words meaning alone, solitary. or lonely
- Tooloora Creek, formerly known as Fourth Creek (25.7000°S 153.0768°E), reportedly derived from Kabi language word meaning louse.
- Tootawwah Creek (25.6974°S 152.9913°E), the name believed to derive from the Kabi language word for small nut
- Towoi Creek (25.0166°S 153.2166°E), the name believed to be derive from the Kabi language word meaning sardine
- Towoi Swamp (25.0038°S 153.2222°E), the name also meaning sardine
- Ungowa Creek (25.5011°S 152.9882°E)
- Urang Creek (25.3166°S 153.05°E)
- Urow-Wa Lakes (24.8833°S 153.2333°E), the name believed to derive from the Kabi language meaning tea tree.
- Wang-ann Lagoon (24.7977°S 153.2044°E), the name believed to derive from the Kabi language meaning carpet snake
- Wathumba Creek (24.9833°S 153.2333°E), the name believed to derive from the Kabi language meaning place of the dead
- Wathumba Swamp (24.9736°S 153.2441°E)
- Wocco Lagoon (24.7833°S 153.1833°E), the name believed to derive from the Kabi language word meaning mopoke.
- Woocoonba Lagoons (25.6°S 153.0333°E).
- Woralie Creek (25.1333°S 153.1166°E)
- Wyuna Creek (25.1333°S 153.3°E)
- Yankee Jack Creek, also known as Tumbowah Creek (25.5389°S 152.9655°E)
- Yankee Jack Lake (25.5763°S 152.9961°E)
- Yeenyargoor Creek (25.4011°S 153.0185°E), the name believed to derive from the Kabi language meaning edible vine
- Yeerall Creek (24.9833°S 153.2333°E), the name believed to derive from the Kabi language meaning small fish
- Yidney Creek (25.2333°S 153.05°E), the name believed to derive from the Kabi language in the Badjala dialect meaning mystical or god figure
- Yidney Lake (25.3208°S 153.1855°E)
- Yindeering Lakes (24.9044°S 153.245°E), the name believed to derive from the Kabi language meaning kingfisher

=== Offshore ===
There are a number of offshore features near the locality:

- Curtis Channel (24.6749°S 153.01493°E), commencesto the north-north-west of the locality of Fraser Island extending as far north as The Keppels in Livingstone Shire
- Hervey Bay (24.9406°S 153.1514°E) to the north-west of the locality
- Marloo Bay (24.9567°S 153.3240°E)
- Platypus Bay (24.9440°S 153.2106°E)
- Poyungan Rocks (25.4150°S 153.1677°E), name derived from the Kabi language word for tree grub.
- Teahwan Rocks (24.8536°S 153.1886°E)
- Wide Bay Harbour (25.7849°S 153.0128°E).
- Yidney Rocks (25.3469°S 153.1997°E), name derived from the Kabi language in the Badjala dialect, meaning a mystical or god figure

=== Other named areas ===
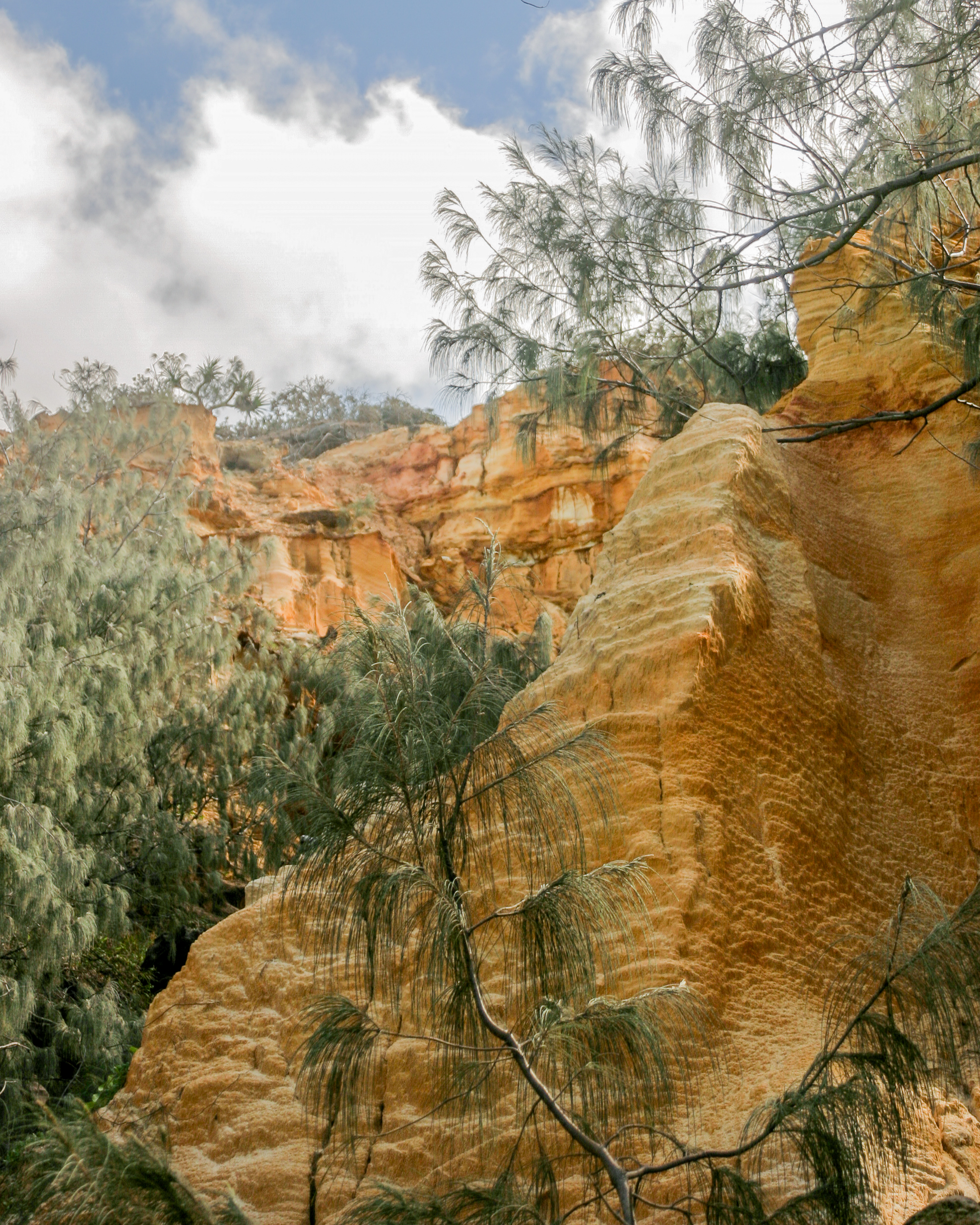
The Pinnacles, 2004

There are many named areas with the locality:

- Central Forest Station (25.4833°S 153.05°E)
- Dilli Village (25.5991°S 153.0916°E)
- Dipuying (25.1666°S 153.1166°E)
- Dundubara, at the mouth of Dundubara Creek (25.1669°S 153.2855°E)
- Enchanted Valley (25.3333°S 153.2°E)
- Fourways, at the major road intersection at the head of Wanggoolba Creek (25.4775°S 153.0677°E)
- Nulla Kunggur Sand Blow (25.2172°S 153.2469°E)
- Orchid Beach (24.9613°S 153.3119°E)
- Pile Valley (25.4734°S 153.0760°E)
- Pine Valley (25.4666°S 153.0833°E)
- Poyungan Rocks (25.4166°S 153.1666°E)
- Teahwan (24.8484°S 153.1888°E)
- The Cathedrals, the area from Wyuna Creek to Eli Creek (25.1567°S 153.2888°E)
- The Declivity (25.2333°S 153.15°E)
- The Pinnacles (25.2567°S 153.2421°E)
- Ungowa (25.4997°S 152.9886°E)
- Valley of the Giants, also known as Ti, the area of giant tallow wood trees (25.3683°S 153.1222°E)
- Wathumba (24.9694°S 153.2388°E)

== Demographics ==
In the 2016 census, the locality of Fraser Island (but not the island as a whole) had a population of 182 people.

In the 2021 census, the locality of Fraser Island (but not the island as a whole) had a population of 152 people.

== Education ==
There are no schools in K'gari, nor the island more generally. The options are distance education and boarding school.

== Facilities ==
Orchid Beach SES Facility is adjacent to the airstrip and heliport (24.9611°S 153.3150°E).

Happy Valley Ambulance Station is an operational ambulance station (25.3361°S 153.2018°E).

Happy Valley SES Facility is in Yidney Drive (25.3377°S 153.1993°E).

K'gari Police Station is immediately north of the locality of Eurong but within the location of K'gari.(25.5050°S 153.1290°E).

The University of the Sunshine Coast operates the K'gari Research and Learning Centre at Dilli Village (25.6001°S 153.0910°E).

== Attractions ==
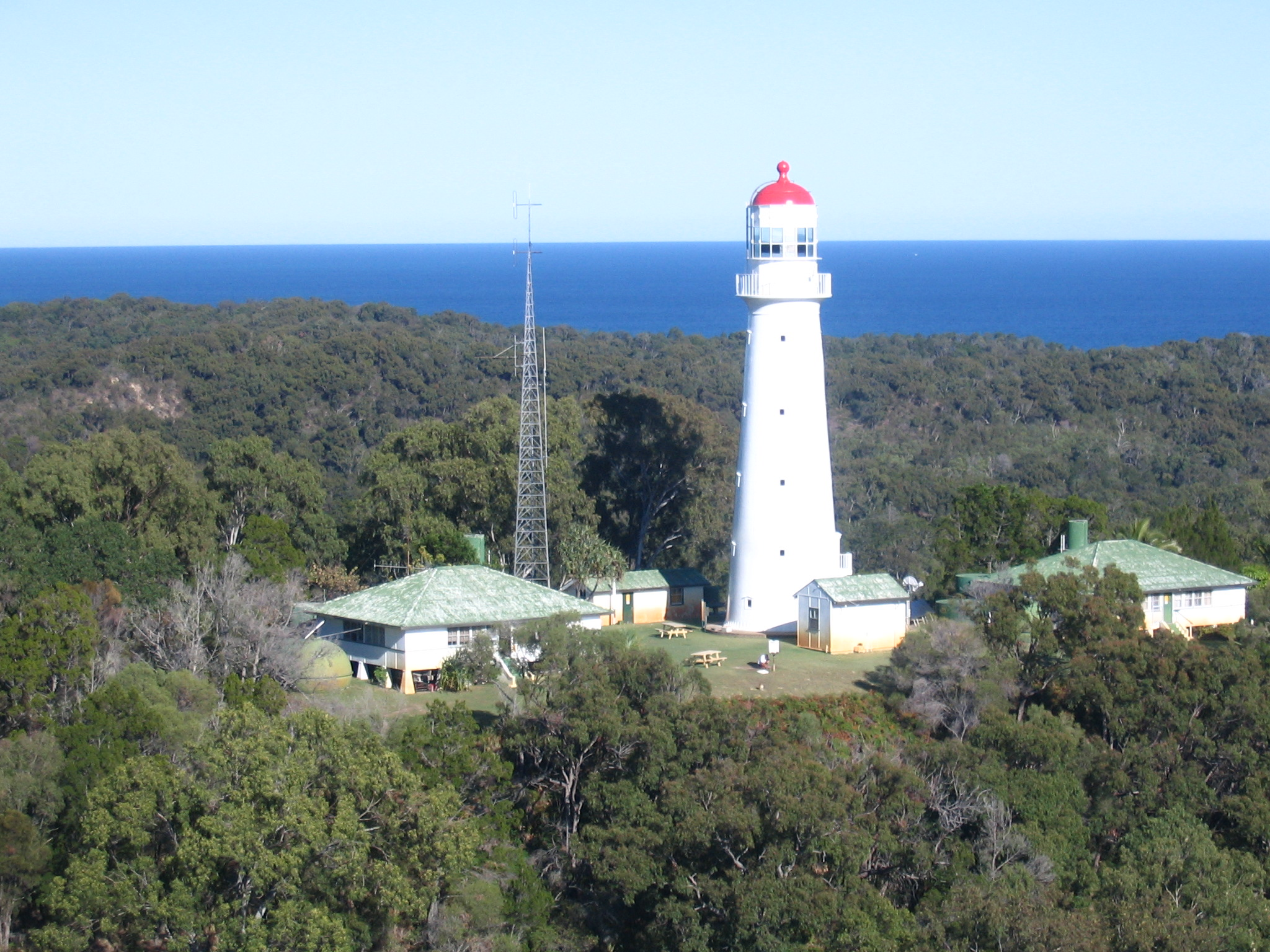
Sandy Cape Lighthouse

Sandy Cape Lighthouse is a heritage-listed active lighthouse. It is close to the northern tip of the island (24.7299°S 153.2088°E).

Simpson Reef is an 80.0-hectare (198-acre) artificial reef in the Great Sandy Marine Park. (25.1878°S 152.9608°E).

The Cathedrals are coloured sand cliffs that have been carved by the wind and rain blowing off the Coral Sea. They are approximately 18 kilometres (11 mi) south of Indian Head on the 75 Mile Beach (25.22043°S 153.25825°E).

The Champagne Pools are a series of natural rock pools that form shallow, sandy swimming holes next to the ocean. They are located on 75 Mile Beach, between Waddy Point and Indian Head.

There are a number of lookouts:

- Markwells Lookout (25.5303°S 153.0969°E)
- Lake Wabby Lookout (25.4560°S 153.1279°E)
- Stonetool Sandblow Lookout(25.4417°S 153.1411°E)
- Knifeblade Sandblow Lookout (25.2265°S 153.2322°E)
- Lake Allom Viewing Platform (25.1985°S 153.2098°E)

== Transport ==
There are a number of airstrips and heliports within the locality:

- Boomanjin Airstrip, also known as Toby's Gap airstrip (25.5897°S 153.0652°E)
- Pailba Airstrip (25.4555°S 152.9969°E)
- Orchid Beach airstrip (24.9592°S 153.3150°E)
- unnamed airstrip (25.2098°S 153.1564°E)
- unnamed airstrip (25.2479°S 153.1368°E)
- Orchid Beach Resort heliport (24.9600°S 153.3155°E)
- Eurong heliport (25.5050°S 153.1292°E)
- Happy Valley heliport (25.3363°S 153.2019°E)
- Kingfisher Resort heliport (25.3904°S 153.0290°E)
