= Happy Valley station =

Happy Valley station may refer to:

- Happy Valley station (Beijing Subway), a station on Line 7 of the Beijing Subway
- Happy Valley station (Chongqing Rail Transit), a station on Line 6 of the Chongqing Rail Transit
- Happy Valley Terminus, a tram stop in Hong Kong
- Happy Valley railway station, a closed railway station in Adelaide, South Australia
