= Happy Valley Union Elementary School District =

School district in California, United States

Address
- 16300 Cloverdale Road Anderson, California, 96007; United States

District information
- Type: Public
- Grades: K–8
- NCES District ID: 0616570

Students and staff
- Students: 468 (2020–2021)
- Teachers: 25.5 (FTE)
- Staff: 35.31 (FTE)
- Student–teacher ratio: 18.35:1

Other information
- Website: www.hvusd.net

Happy Valley Elementary School District is a public school district based in Shasta County, California, United States.
