= Happy Valley, American Samoa =

Residential area with farmland near Mount Tepatasi

Coordinates: 14.275°S 170.698°W

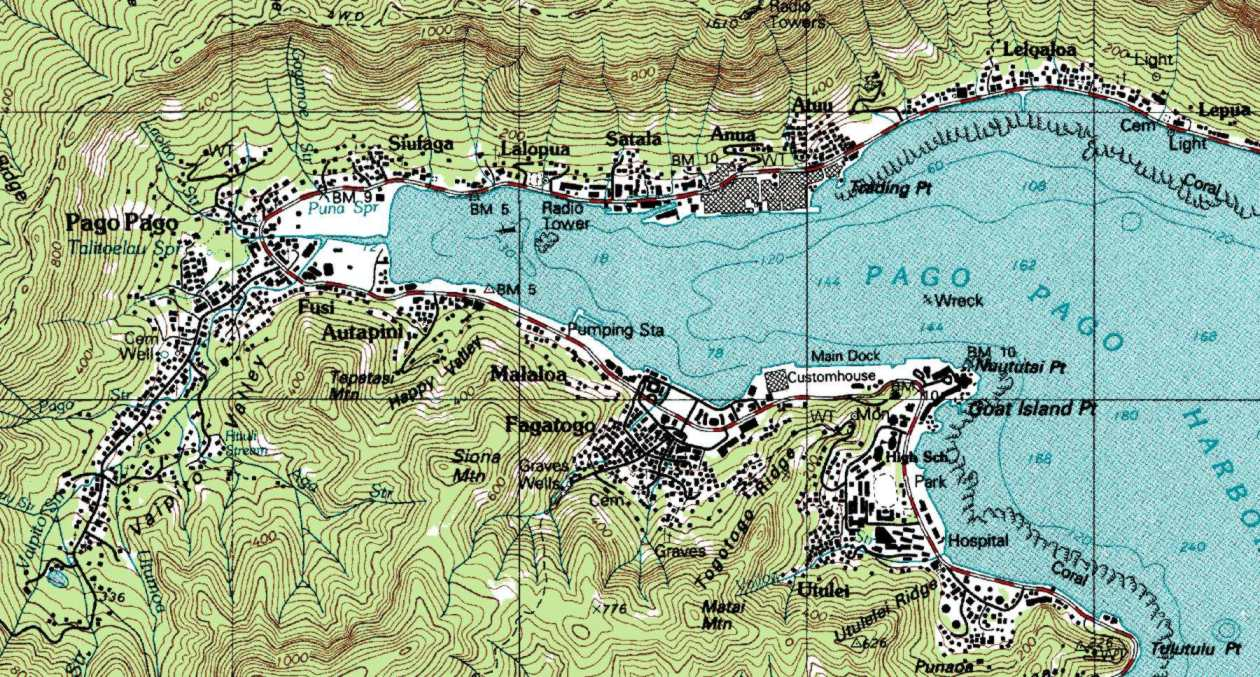
Map of Pago Pago.

Happy Valley is a residential area with farmland located near Mount Tepatasi in Pago Pago, American Samoa. Six World War II ammunition bunkers are visible along the main road leading into Happy Valley, situated on the left-hand side before reaching a dirt road. This dirt road, also on the left, leads to a large concrete bunker that once served as the naval communications headquarters during the war. Tutuila Island, where Happy Valley is located, is dotted with over fifty pillbox fortifications from the same period. Among these, the most prominent is the U.S. Marine Corps communication bunker in Pago Pago. This bunker is located in Autapini, which lies between Malaloa and Happy Valley.

== History ==
During World War II, the Happy Valley Command Post was established, comprising approximately 70 structures of diverse sizes and purposes. This installation included six bomb shelters and a large concrete bunker that functioned as the naval command headquarters. The complex featured a variety of facilities, such as small boiler rooms, shelters, latrines, a substantial administration building, a sickbay office, mess halls, and living quarters.

In October 1951, the Happy Valley Christian School was established. The school was led by Ieti Mageo and missionary Maurice Luce. It was situated on land belonging to the Mageo family and utilized a large building previously used by U.S. Marines. The school provided education in English, modeled after the British and American systems, and accommodated students up to the 8th grade before they transitioned to government high schools. The school expanded its mission with additional efforts, such as opening a branch in Faleasiu, Samoa, during 1957–1958. Key educators included Maurice Luce, Ieti Mageo, and others from the local and missionary communities. Early mornings at the school were characterized by prayer and preparation, reflecting its Christian foundation. Aside from academics, Happy Valley was a center for spiritual activities, including church services, open-air gatherings, and music training. The school became notable for fostering community and faith-based initiatives in the region. Maurice Luce and his wife were instrumental in promoting Christian teachings through printed materials and local outreach. In later years, the site evolved into a hub for broader community and religious activities.

In 2021, a proposal to build a correctional facility on Mageo family land in Happy Valley sparked controversy. The Sa’o (chief), Rev. Mageo Patolo Mageo, supported the project, citing its isolated location and potential benefits for the family. However, resistance emerged within the family and from the Pago Pago Village Council (PPVC), which raised concerns about cultural respect, environmental impacts, and prioritizing prisons over community-focused projects. A meeting in November 2021 resulted in a unanimous decision to reject the project.
