= Happy Valley, Calaveras County, California =

Unincorporated community in California, United States

Happy Valley
- Unincorporated community
- Location in California Happy Valley (the United States)
- Coordinates: 38°18′00″N 120°41′02″W
- Country: United States
- State: California
- County: Calaveras
- Elevation: 1,510 ft (460 m)

Happy Valley is an unincorporated community in Calaveras County, California, United States. It lies at an elevation of 1509 feet (460 m).

Happy Valley was settled by immigrants from France, who engaged in placer gold mining and viticulture, establishing a stone winery. The date of the town's establishment is uncertain; it may antedate the 1848 discovery of gold at Sutter's Mill. At its peak there were thousands of residents of many ethnic backgrounds in the vicinity; by 1956 only two buildings remained.
