= Happy Valley, Queensland (K'gari) =

Happy Valley Queensland
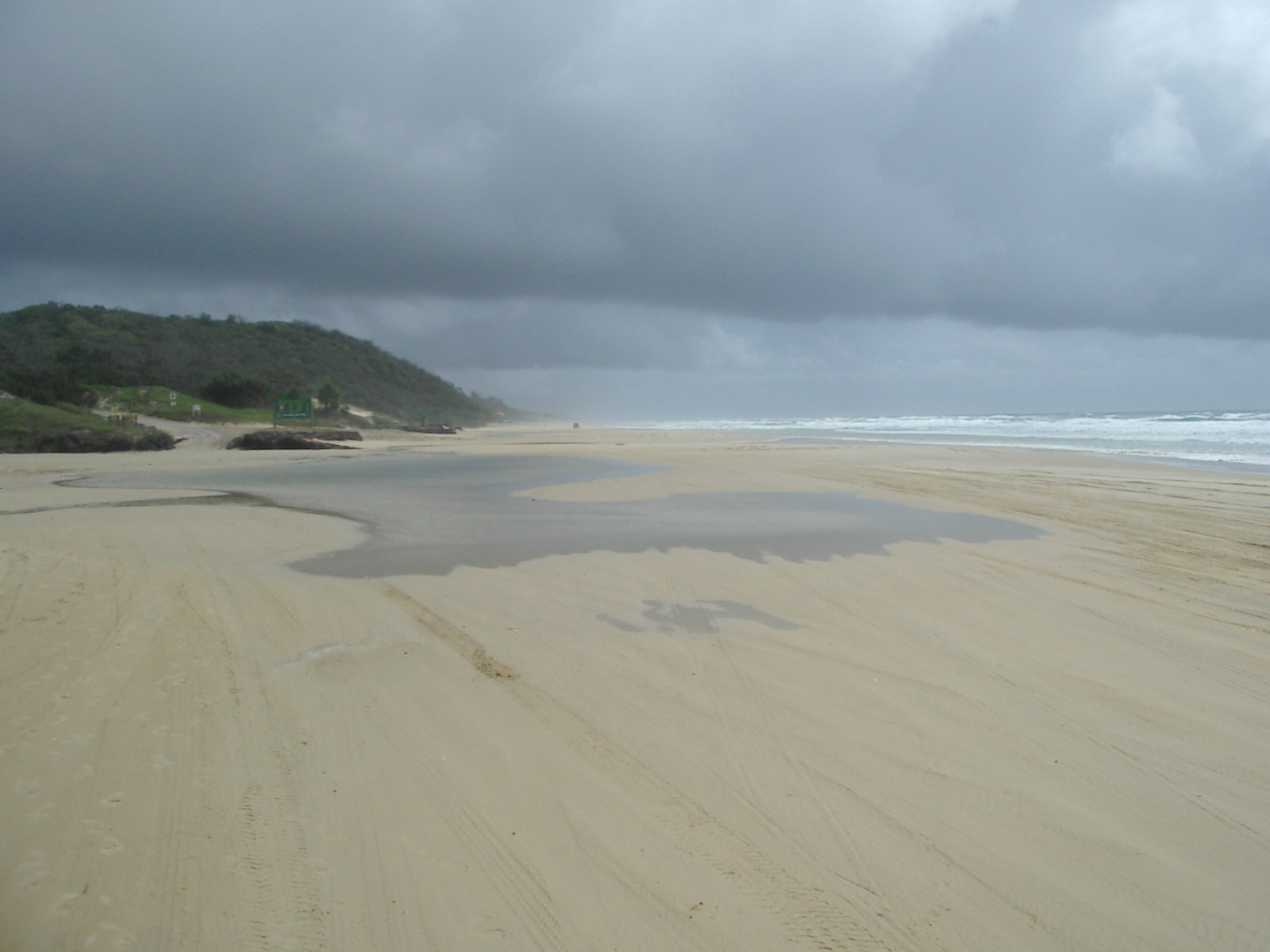
- Beach at Happy Valley, 2004

- Coordinates: 25.3375°S 153.2005°E
- Postcode(s): 4581
- Time zone: AEST (UTC+10:00)
- LGA(s): Fraser Coast Region
- State electorate(s): Hervey Bay
- Federal division(s): Wide Bay

Happy Valley is a coastal town in the locality of K'gari (formerly Fraser Island) in the Fraser Coast Region, Queensland, Australia.

== Geography ==
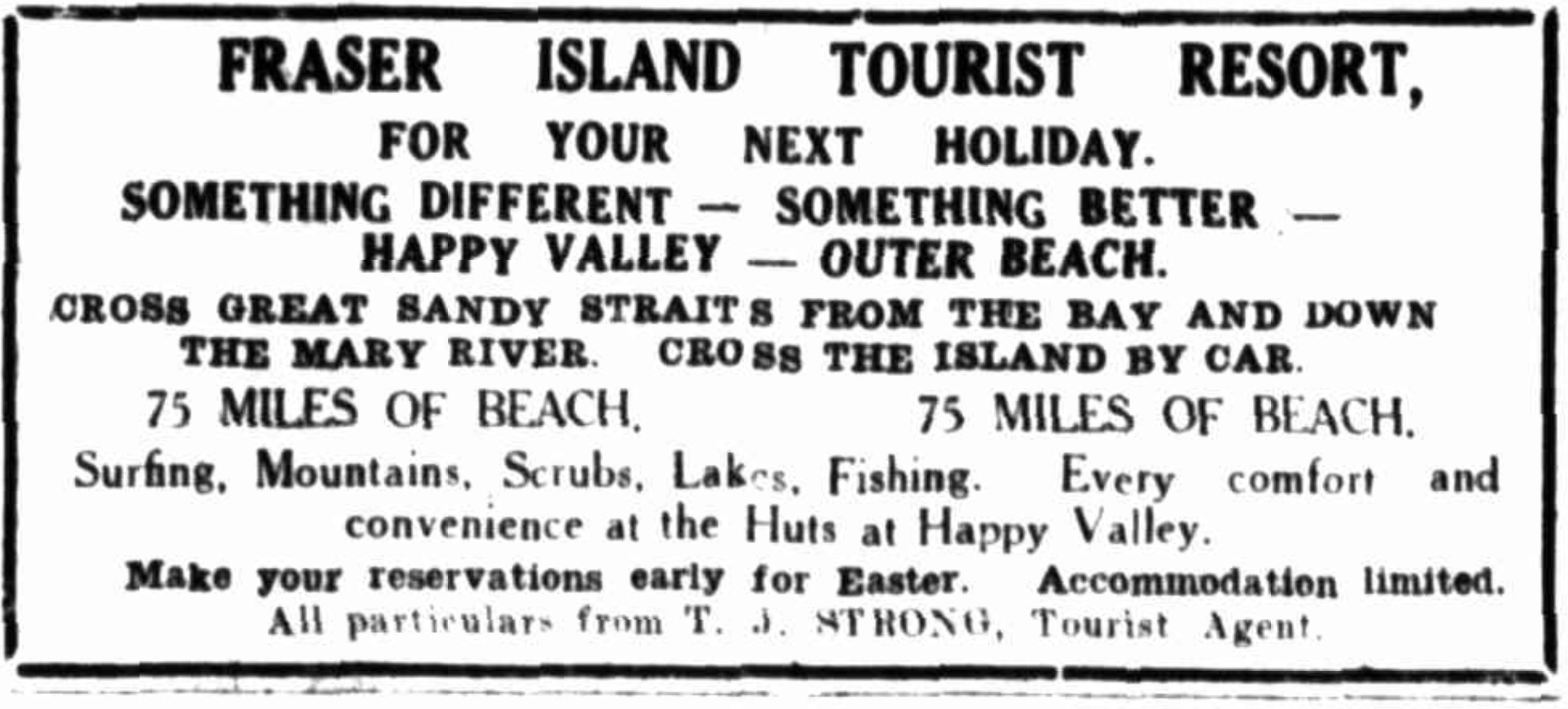
Advertising for the Happy Valley tourist resort, 9 February 1935

The island K'gari is divided into two localities, one very small one, Eurong, and a very large one called K'gari (the locality) with Happy Valley being its only township. Happy Valley is located approximately halfway up the east coast facing the Pacific Ocean.

One will need a 4WD vehicle to drive along the beach in order to get there.

== History ==
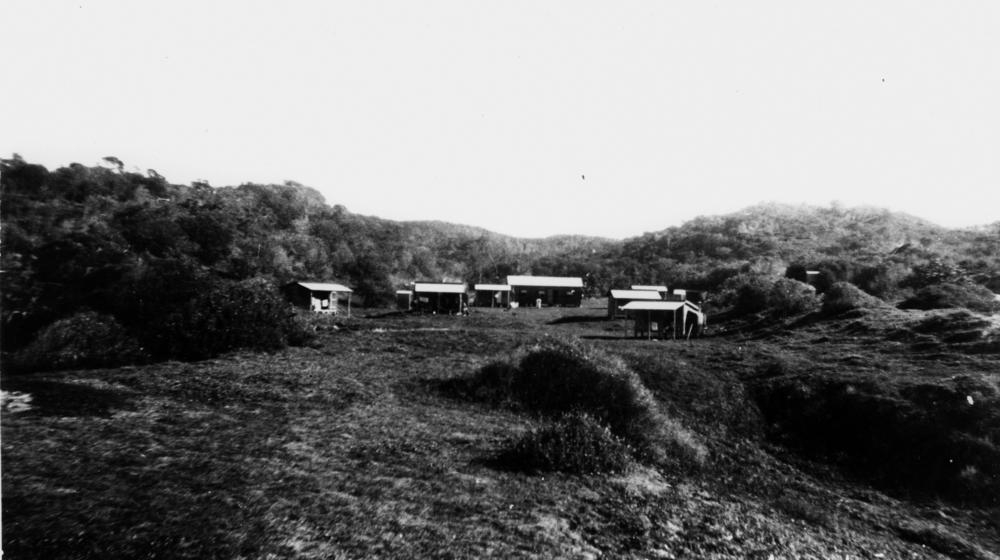
Huts at Happy Valley, circa 1935

From August 1934, tourists started coming to the Fraser Island Tourist Resort, a group of huts "offering every comfort and convenience" at Happy Valley.

On 7 December 2020 a bushfire, started in October by an illegal campfire, threatened the town and caused residents to evacuate their homes as it burned out of control. Early in the morning (3:35am) the Queensland Fire and Emergency Services (QFES) issued an emergency warning in which residents were advised to "leave immediately". Heavy rainfall in mid-December helped contain the fire and the QFES handed control back to the Queensland Parks and Wildlife Service (QPWS). Up to 14 December 2020 the fire had been burning for over two months and more than half the island had been "blackened". Though the fire was still burning the island was declared safe for visitors and reopened on 15 December.
