= Happy Valley, Plumas County, California =

Grizzly Valley area in Plumas County

Happy Valley is an area in Plumas County, California, United States, is located in Grizzly Valley.

== Geography ==
Happy Valley is located at 39°52′00″N 120°36′00″W
