= Matthews Cottage =

- Location within New South Wales Location within Australia
- 35°52′34″S 148°29′39″E
- Location: Kiandra, Kosciuszko National Park, Snowy Valleys Council, New South Wales, Australia

Site notes
- Owner: Office of Environment and Heritage

New South Wales Heritage Register
- Official name: Matthews Cottage
- Type: State heritage (built)
- Designated: 2 April 1999
- Reference no.: 998
- Type: historic site

Matthews Cottage is a heritage-listed cottage at Kiandra in the Kosciuszko National Park, Snowy Valleys Council, New South Wales, Australia. The property is owned by the Office of Environment and Heritage, an agency of the Government of New South Wales. It was added to the New South Wales State Heritage Register on 2 April 1999.

== History ==
The site of Matthews' Cottage, Lot 4, Section 12 of Kiandra, was initially sold at an auction of Crown land to George Venterman on 29 June 1874. George, who is recorded as a "miner of Kiandra" paid the sum of 20 shillings 3 pence for the land. In March 1879 the land was sold to Frederick Blaxland of Binjura, and subsequently to William John Foley of Kiandra.

"Bill" Foley was born at Goulburn Jail in 1879, the son of a warden. By the age of sixteen, Bill was working on the mail coach from Kiandra to Cooma. This work often proved to be exciting to the young Bill, particularly as the coach frequently carried gold for the banks. At these times a gold escort of six to eight armed men would accompany the coach. Bill was later employed on mining dredges, initially at Adelong and later at Myrtleford in Victoria. His departure from Myrtleford was by pushbike; he rode all the way to Grahamstown, near Adelong, for his wedding with Jenny Bradley. The Bradley family has a long association with the Snowy Mountains, various branches of the family having settled at Talbingo, the Yarrangobilly Hotel, Yarrangobilly Caves as the first caretakers, and Kiandra. During 1900 the Foleys moved to Kiandra where Bill found work at Oliver Harris' store. Work comprised the butchering of livestock and subsequent transportation of the meat by packhorses to miners at Lobbs Hole.

Photographic evidence indicates that the original cottage was constructed by the Foleys at some time between 1900 and 1906.

== Description ==
The Cottage was a simple three-roomed building with a verandah facing the street. Construction was of weatherboards with a corrugated iron gable roof and the interior was lined with timber boards. The construction utilised modern techniques and materials, due to the technology available within a typical rural town at the time and the easy access to major centres via reasonable roads.

The builder is not known. It is likely that the sawn timber framing would have been obtained from one of the local sawmills such as Alpine Creek. Lining boards, windows and doors are likely to have been obtained from outside the region. The use of basalt stonework in the fireplace is relatively uncommon, although the Kiandra Courthouse and Police Lockup were constructed entirely of basalt.

== Heritage listing ==
Matthews Cottage was listed on the New South Wales State Heritage Register on 2 April 1999.
