= Pterostylis oreophila =

Kiandra greenhood

Conservation status
- Critically endangered (EPBC Act)

Scientific classification
- Kingdom: Plantae
- Clade: Tracheophytes
- Clade: Angiosperms
- Clade: Monocots
- Order: Asparagales
- Family: Orchidaceae
- Subfamily: Orchidoideae
- Tribe: Cranichideae
- Genus: Pterostylis
- Species: P. oreophila

Binomial name
- Pterostylis oreophila Clemesha

Species of orchid

Pterostylis oreophila, commonly known as the Kiandra greenhood or blue-tongued greenhood is a species of orchid endemic to south-eastern Australia. Flowering and non-flowering plants have three to five dark green, fleshy leaves and flowering plants have a single green and white, sickle-shaped flower with a deeply notched, bulging sinus between the lateral sepals.

== Description ==
Pterostylis oreophila is a terrestrial, perennial, deciduous, herb with an underground tuber. Flowering plants have between three and five dark green, oblong to elliptic, fleshy leaves lying flat on the ground, each leaf 30–70 mm (1–3 in) long and 20–30 mm (0.8–1 in) wide. A single flower 25–30 mm (0.98–1.2 in) long and 12–16 mm (0.5–0.6 in) wide is borne on a flowering stem 80–200 mm (3–8 in) high. The flowers are white with light green stripes. The dorsal sepal and petals are fused, forming a hood or "galea" over the column, the dorsal sepal about the same length as the petals and pointed. The lateral sepals are erect with a wide gap between them and the galea and there is a bulging sinus with a deep central notch between them. The tips of the lateral sepals are erect and 10–16 mm (0.4–0.6 in) long. The labellum is bluish, blunt, curved, 13–20 mm (0.5–0.8 in) long and 4–5 mm (0.16–0.20 in) and protrudes above the sinus. Flowering occurs from November to January.

== Taxonomy and naming ==
Pterostylis oreophila was first formally described in 1974 by Stephen Clemesha from a specimen collected near Kiandra and the description was published in The Orchadian. The specific epithet (oreophila) is derived from the Ancient Greek words oros meaning "mountain" or "hill" and philos meaning "beloved" or "dear".

== Distribution and habitat ==
The Kiandra greenhood grows in moist soil, often near streams, in montane and subalpine forest and shrubland between the Brindabella Range in New South Wales and north-eastern Victoria.

== Conservation ==
Pterostylis oreophila is listed as "critically endangered" (CR) under the Environment Protection and Biodiversity Conservation Act 1999 (EPBC Act) and under the New South Wales Government NSW Threatened Species Conservation Act. Only about 240 mature plants are known from four main populations. The main threats to the species are grazing and trampling by cattle, horses and pigs, horse trail riding and weed invasion, including by blackberry (Rubus fruticosus).
