= James Barnet =

Australian architect (1827–1904)

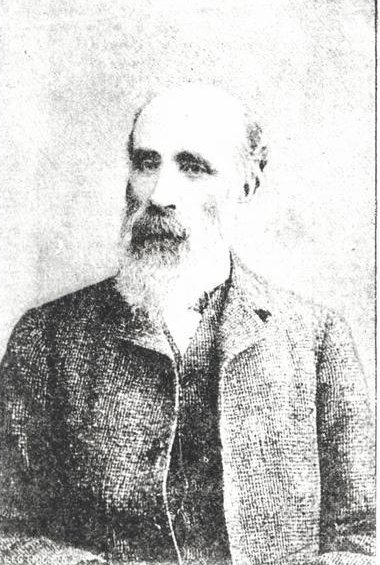
- James Barnet, circa 1888
- Born: James Johnstone Barnet; 1827; Almericlose, Angus, Scotland, U.K.
- Died: 16 December 1904 (aged 76–77); Forest Lodge, New South Wales
- Resting place: Rookwood Cemetery
- Occupations: Colonial Architect, New South Wales
- Years active: 1862 – 1890
- Known for: Design of Italianate, Gothic Revival, and Neoclassical public buildings with heavily worked façades, made typically with sandstone and brick, constructed in Sydney and throughout New South Wales
- Spouse: Rosa Barnet

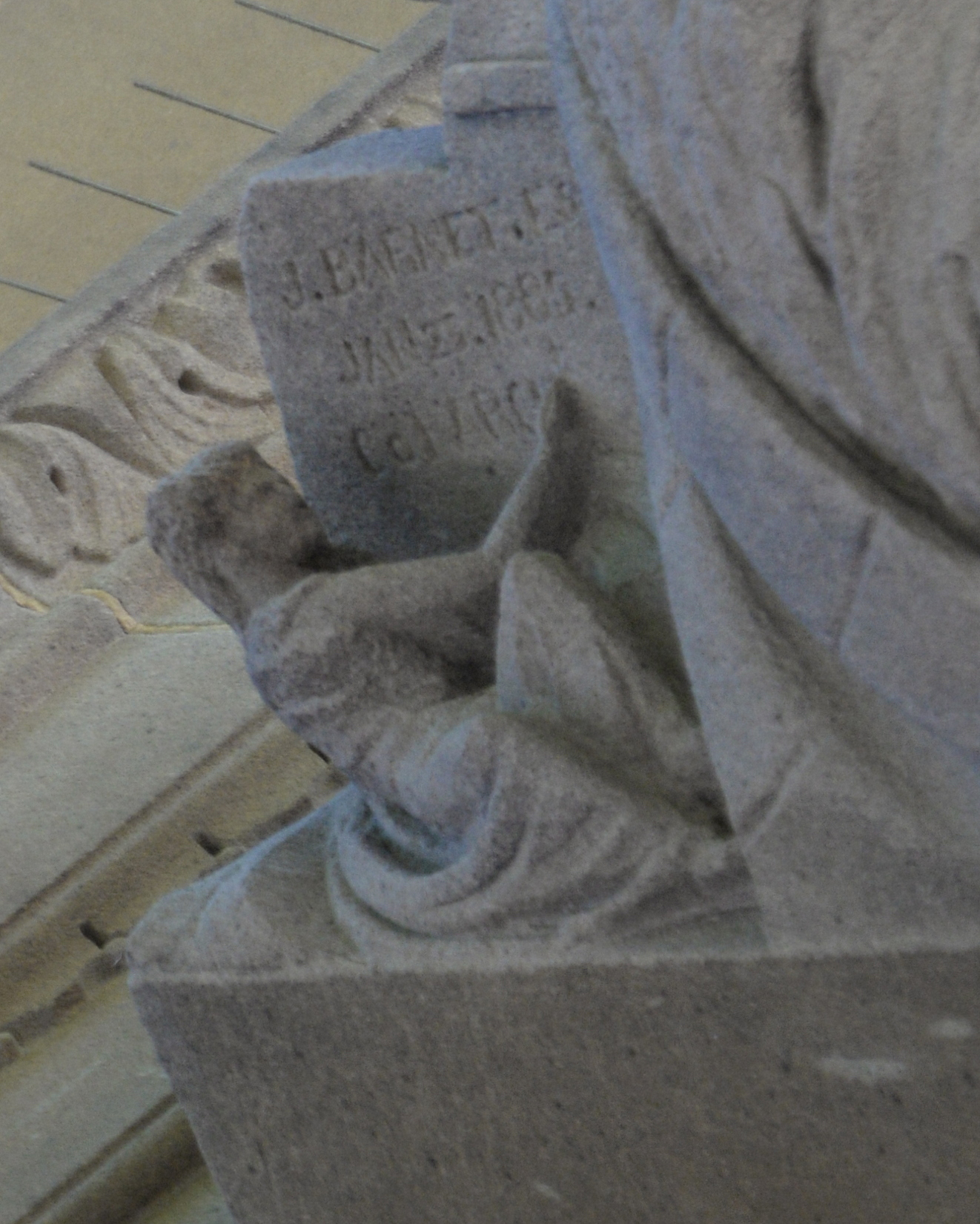
Detail of Sydney GPO, showing Barnet's name along with date:Jan 23 1885 (image has been turned sideways to facilitate reading)

James Johnstone Barnet (1827 – 16 December 1904) was the Colonial Architect for Colonial New South Wales, serving from 1862 to 1890.

== Early life ==
Barnet was born the son of a builder in Arbroath, Scotland, and was educated at the local high school. In 1843, at the age of sixteen, Barnet moved to London, where he became a builder's apprentice, studying drawing under William Dyce RA and architecture with CJ Richardson FRIBA. He then became of clerk of works with the Worshipful Company of Fishmongers. In 1854, he married and sailed for Sydney, Australia, with his new wife, Rosa. In Sydney, he worked first as a builder for Edmund Blacket, then became Clerk of Works at the University of Sydney.

== Colonial architect ==
In 1860, he joined the Colonial Architect's Office. In 1862, he was acting head of the office; in 1865, he was promoted to the post of Colonial Architect. He held that position for twenty-five years until the Office was reorganised in 1890.

In that period the department built 169 post and telegraph offices, 130 courthouses, 155 police stations, 110 lock-ups, 20 lighthouses and many other types of buildings. His major works include the General Post Office building in Sydney, Callan Park Lunatic Asylum, the Australian Museum, the Colonial Secretary's building, Lands Department building, and the Anderson Stuart Building at Sydney University.

=== Major projects ===
Some major works completed by Barnet include:

- Defence works at Botany Bay, Port Jackson and Newcastle
- Court houses, lock-ups, police stations and post offices throughout New South Wales (see Court houses in New South Wales)
- Lighthouses, including rebuilding the Macquarie Lighthouse first built by Francis Greenway, Smoky Cape Lighthouse at South West Rocks, Sugarloaf Point Light Station at Seal Rocks, Barranjoey Head at Palm Beach, Green Cape at Eden and the similarly designed five lighthouses, Richmond River Light, Clarence River Light, Tacking Point Lighthouse, Crowdy Head Light and Fingal Head Light, built in 1878–1880.

=== Major Sydney public buildings ===
Major public buildings in Sydney by Barnet include:

The Mortuary Station in Rookwood Cemetery circa 1865, now All Saints Church, Canberra

- Australian Museum (new wing)
- Colonial Secretary's Building
- Callan Park Lunatic Asylum
- Customs House
- Darlinghurst Court House
- Department of Lands building
- East Sydney Technical College
- General Post Office
- Medical School Anderson Stuart building at the University of Sydney
- Mortuary Station, Central Railway
- Mortuary Station, Rookwood
- North Sydney Post Office (opened 1889 as St Leonards PO, renamed 1890)
- Parramatta Post Office
- Public Works Building
- State Library of New South Wales
- Traffic Court No. 2, Sydney
- Victoria Lodge, Botanical Gardens

The Colonial Architect's office was also responsible for maintenance of public buildings. Between 1865 and 1881, Barnet had supervised 1,490 projects. Other roles were assigned to Barnet: for example, he was put in charge of the arrangements for the visit of the Duke of Edinburgh in 1868.

==== Sydney International Exhibition building ====
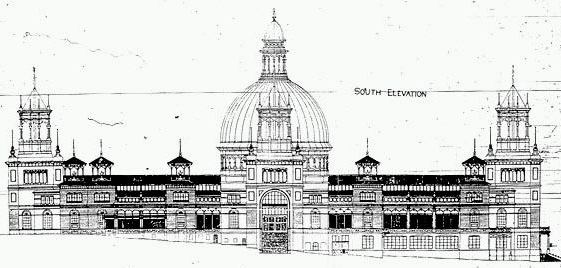
Architectural drawing of the Garden Palace, Sydney, Southern elevation

In 1879, Barnet was put in charge of the design and erection of the Sydney International Exhibition building. The Colonial Architect's Office completed this large task in nine months, including preparing 412 drawings, management of the accounts and payments associated with the project, and supervision of the building. Night shifts were used to get through the project using the first electric light in Sydney. Although the project was judged a success at the end, Barnet was constantly criticised in Parliament during the construction. The project overran its budget of £50,000 by more than three times, costing £184,570.

Barnet had previously been criticised in 1874 over the new wing of the Australian Museum by the museum's trustees and a select committee of the Legislative Assembly. By contrast, also in 1874, the first stage of his General Post Office in Martin Place received high praise, putting aside the much criticised carved figures in the arcade.

=== Defence buildings ===
Between 1870 and 1889 Barnet was on the commission set up to plan the colony's defence. Barnet built new batteries and barracks. In July 1889, defence works became the responsibility of a military works branch of the Public Works Department. The new director was Lieutenant–Colonel F.R. de Wolski. De Wolski criticised Barnet's work. Barnet was not prompt in handing over plans and documents for defence works. There had been rumours about the project at Bare Island battery in Botany Bay. On 1 July 1890, a royal commission was set up to investigate the letting of contracts and report on the work completed. The evidence presented by staff of the Colonial Architect's office and Barnet was contradictory. The commission found that the work was below standard and the Colonial Architect's supervision of the project was not adequate. While the minister supported Barnet, the commission's censure was a regrettable end to his distinguished career. Barnet resigned as Colonial Architect. He believed that de Wolski had significantly influenced the commission and held that the commission’s findings were unjust, petty and spiteful.

== Architectural approach and legacy ==
Barnet's work drew from a variety classical sources, sometimes with elements from specific buildings, with levels of elaboration or features that suited the function. For instance his courthouses often included a bold Neoclassical portico, while his post offices often featured a rustic Italianate clocktower, and both types of buildings often featured generous verandahs or arcaded loggias, shaded areas that suited the hot colonial climate. His larger works like the Sydney departmental buildings, the GPO, and the Garden Palace synthesised elements from various periods of the Italian Renaissance, as well as from English architects such as Christopher Wren and Charles Robert Cockerell, to create impressive compositions. When suitable he could also design in a lively Gothic Revival style, notably the two cemetery railway stations. Some later designs drew directly from the later Renaissance, from what we now call Mannerism and Baroque, notably Bathurst Gaol, the Central Police Court and the Rocks Police Station.

After his retirement in 1899 he published a short overview of architecture in his adopted colony, entitled Architectural work in Sydney, New South Wales, 1788-1899.

He had little time for the new styles of architecture becoming fashionable in Sydney at the end of the nineteenth century, particularly those that followed American trends. Barnet was also critical of domestic architectural fashions, cluttered with what he saw as useless ornamentation, and "surmounted with blazing red tiles from France."

== Personal life ==
Barnet died in 1904 and is buried in the Presbyterian section of Rookwood Cemetery. His wife had died in 1890. He was survived by four daughters and three sons, two of whom also practiced as architects.

== Gallery ==
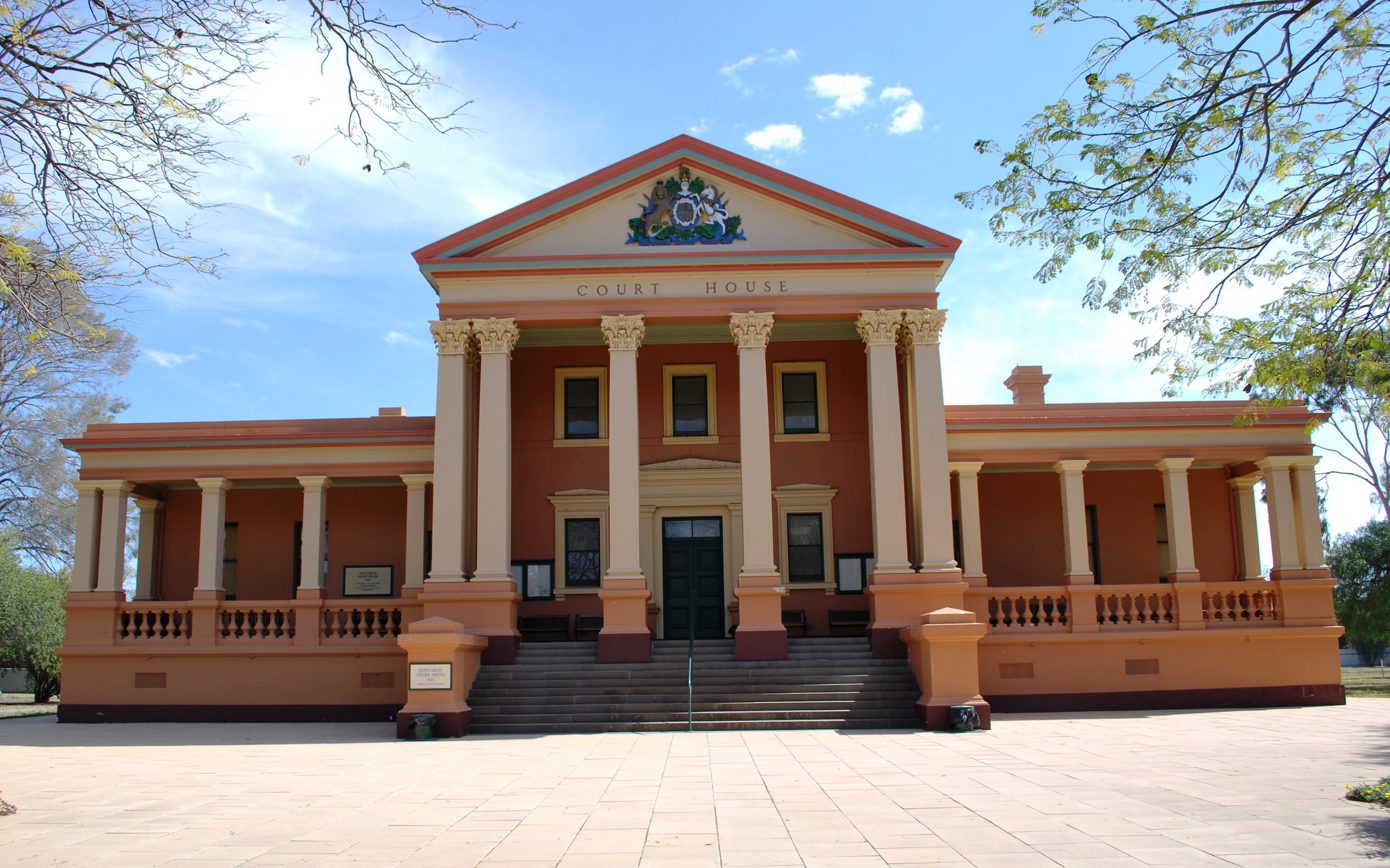
Court house at Deniliquin, New South Wales, occupied in 1892

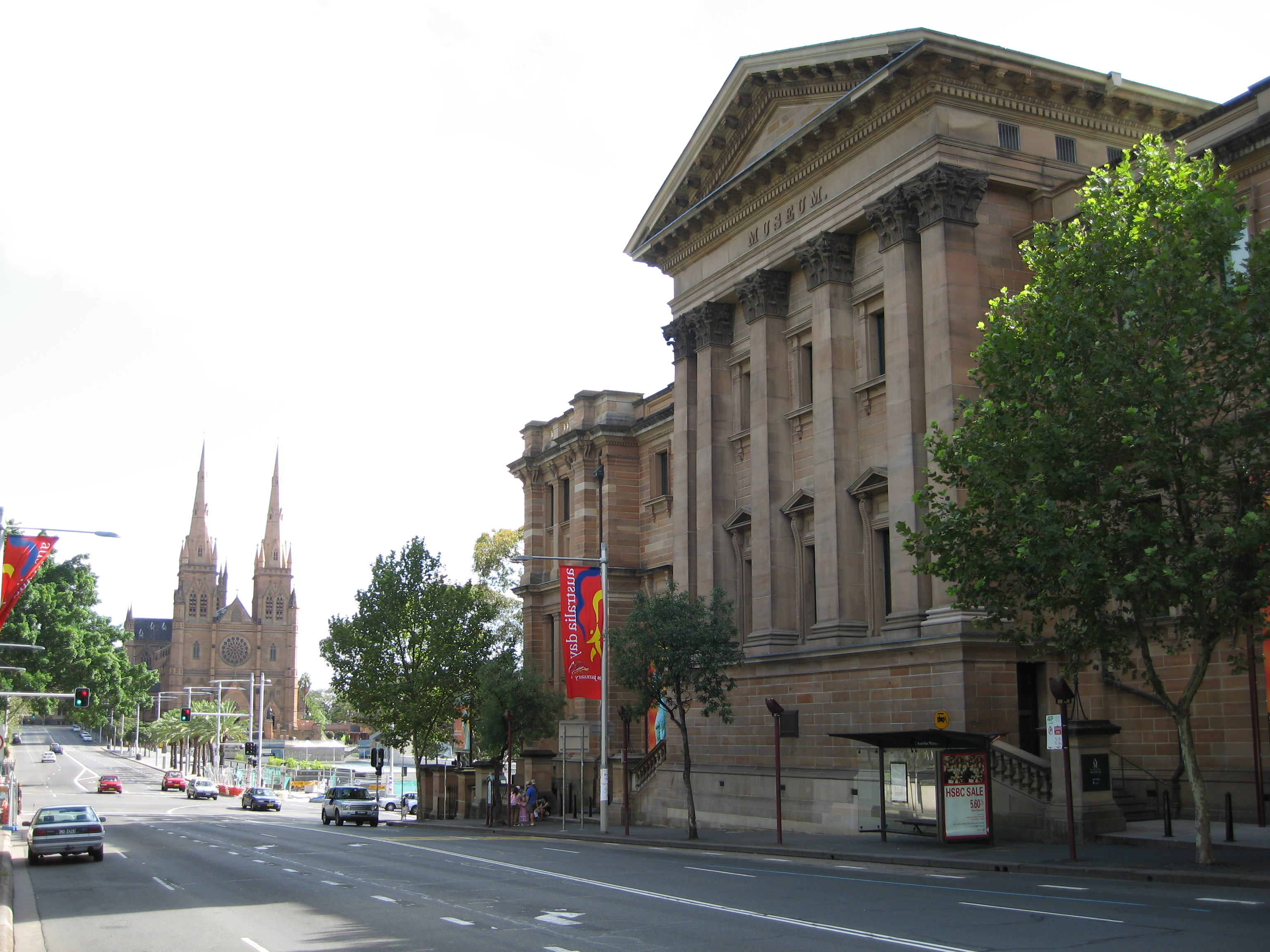
Australian Museum in Sydney, opened 1857

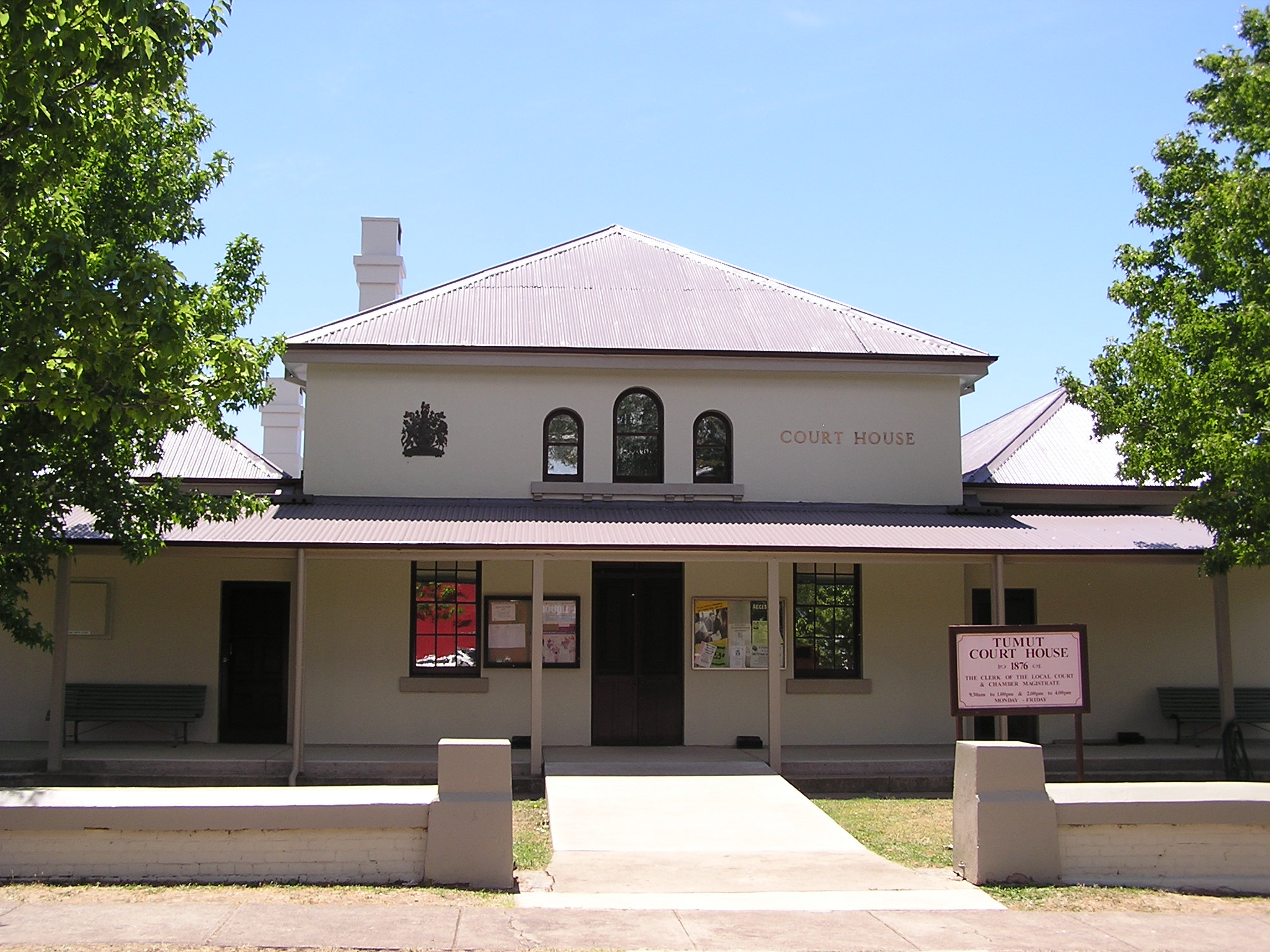
Tumut Court House was completed in 1878 and the Stables in 1879

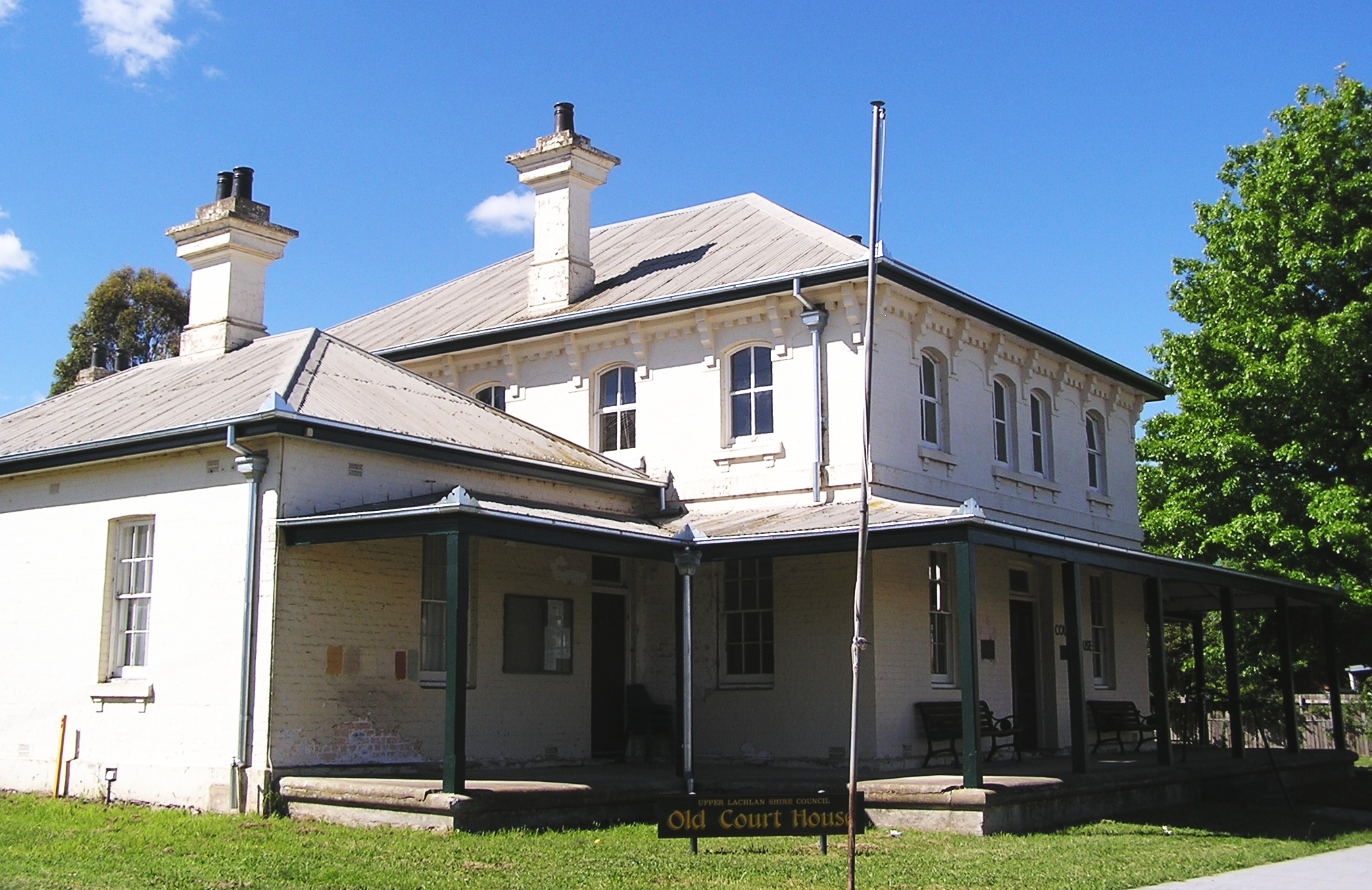
Gunning Court House completed in 1879

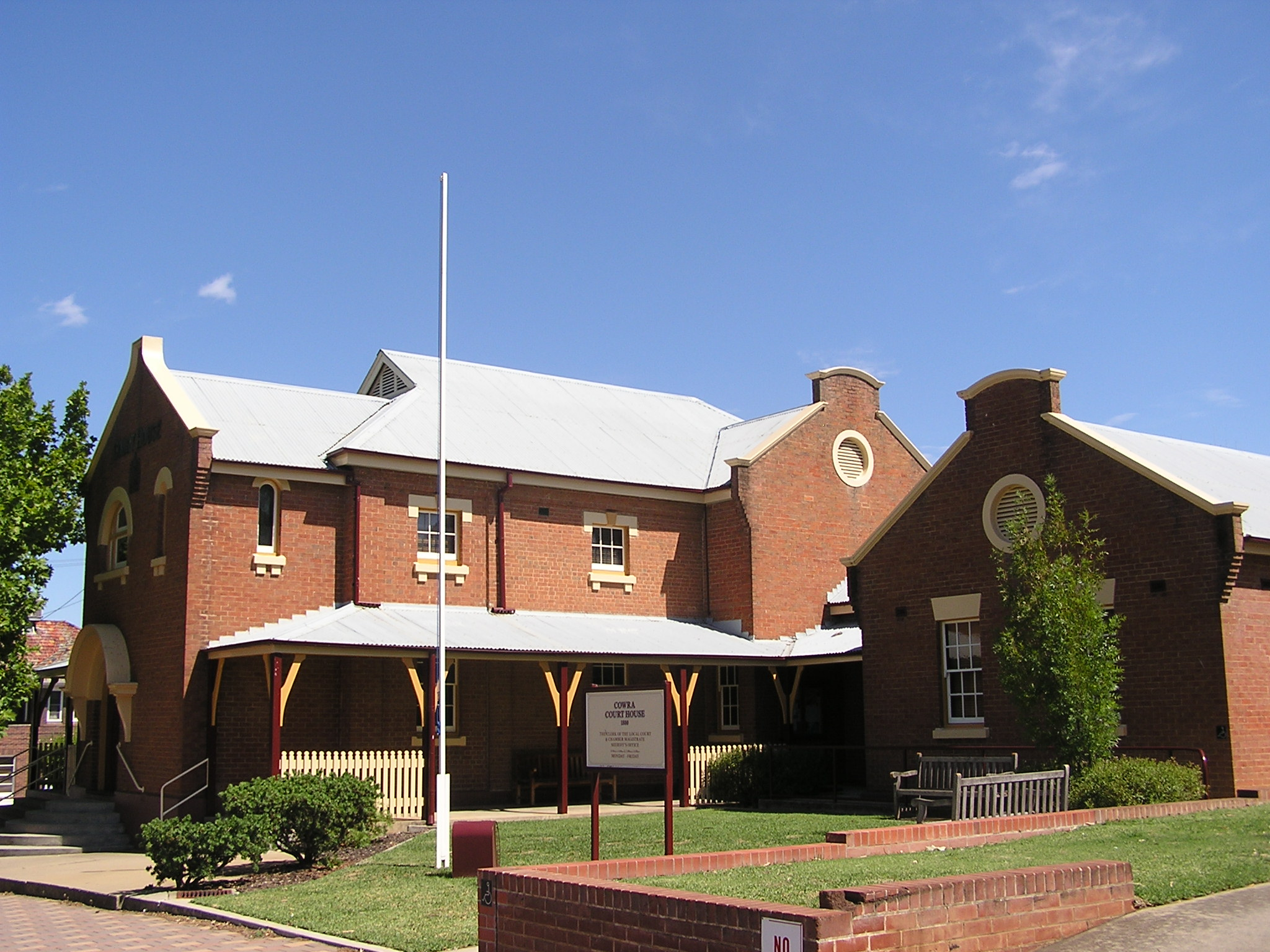
Cowra Court House completed in 1879

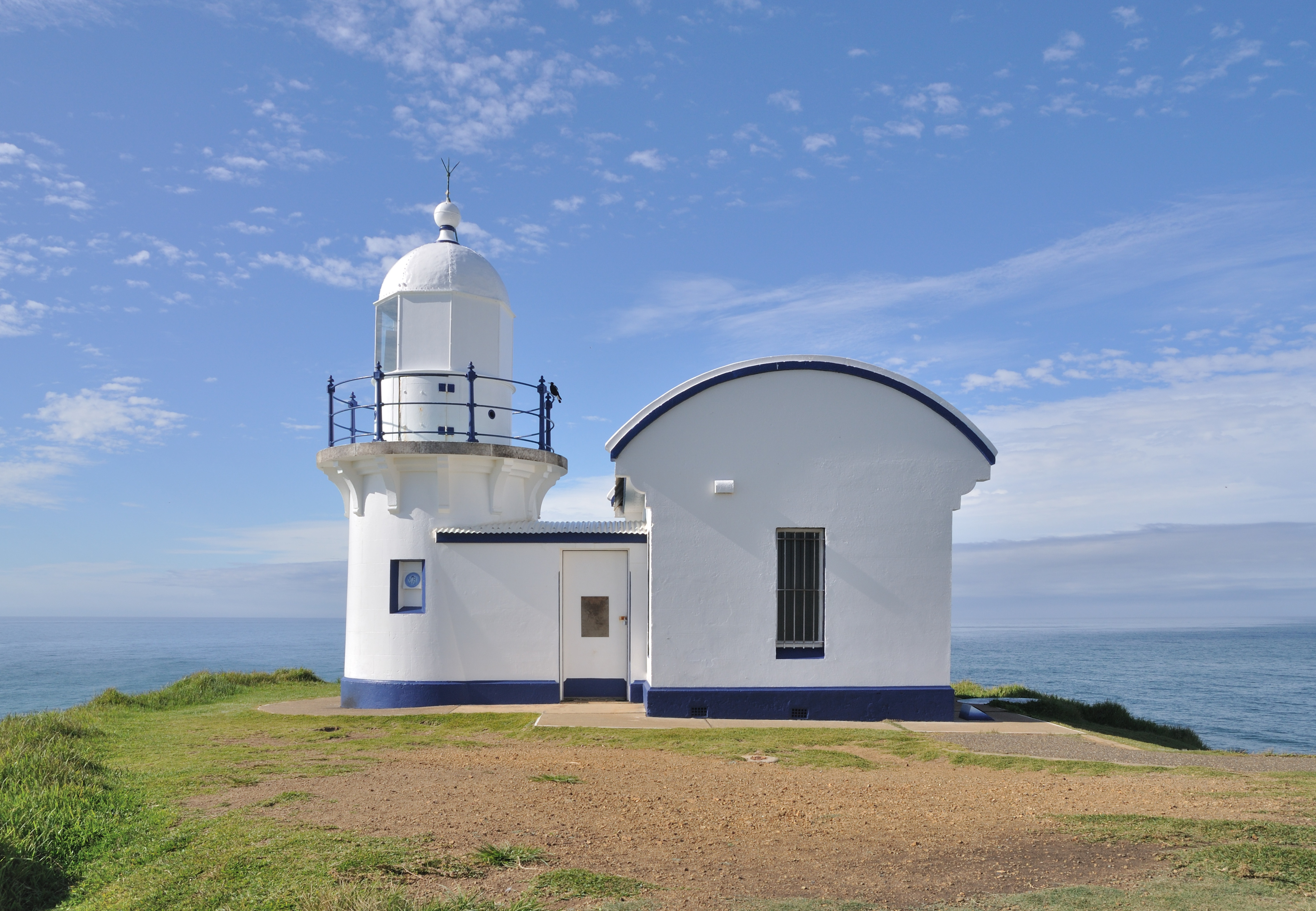
Tacking Point Lighthouse, built in 1879

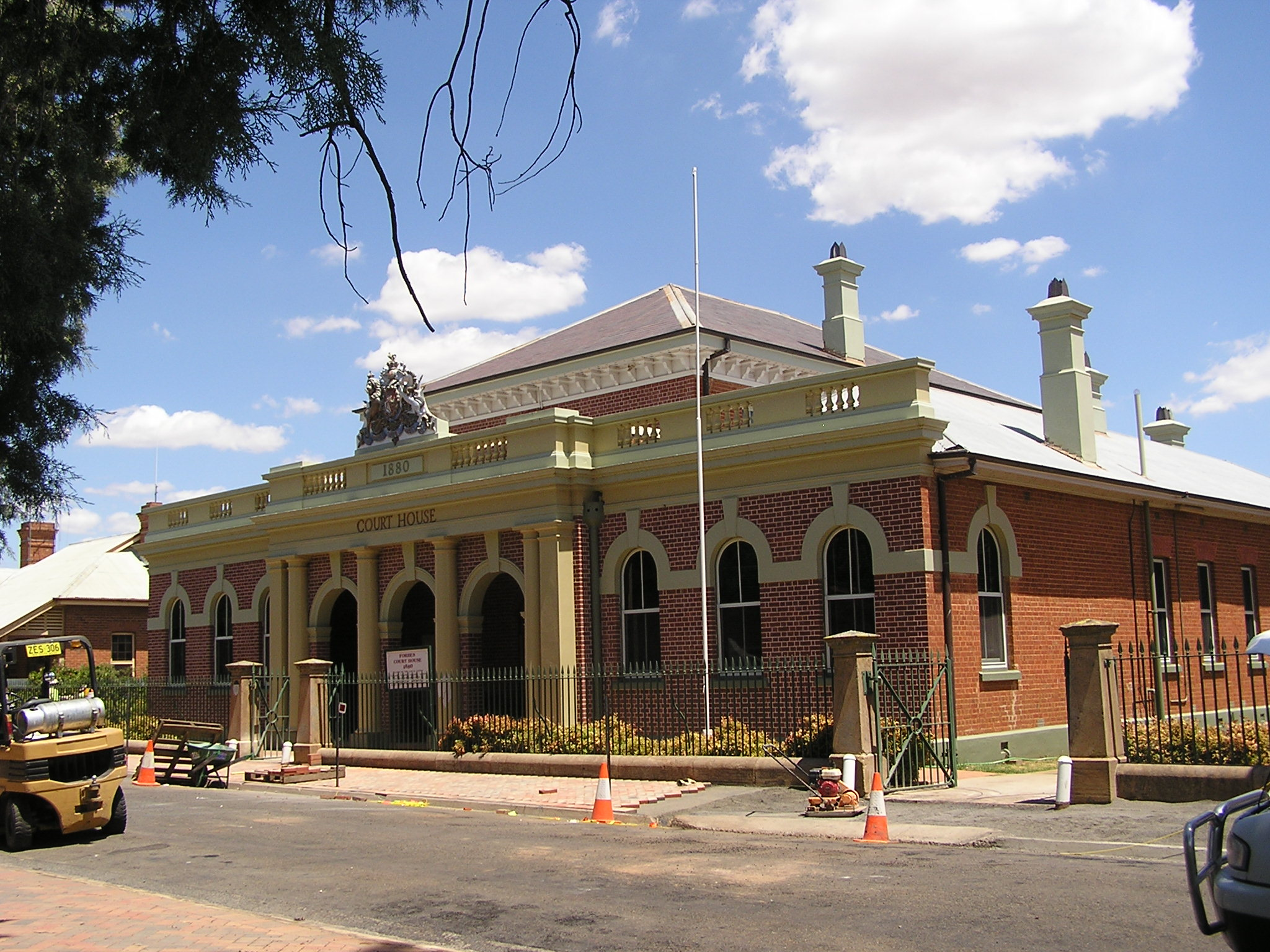
Forbes - a Classical Revival courthouse completed in 1880

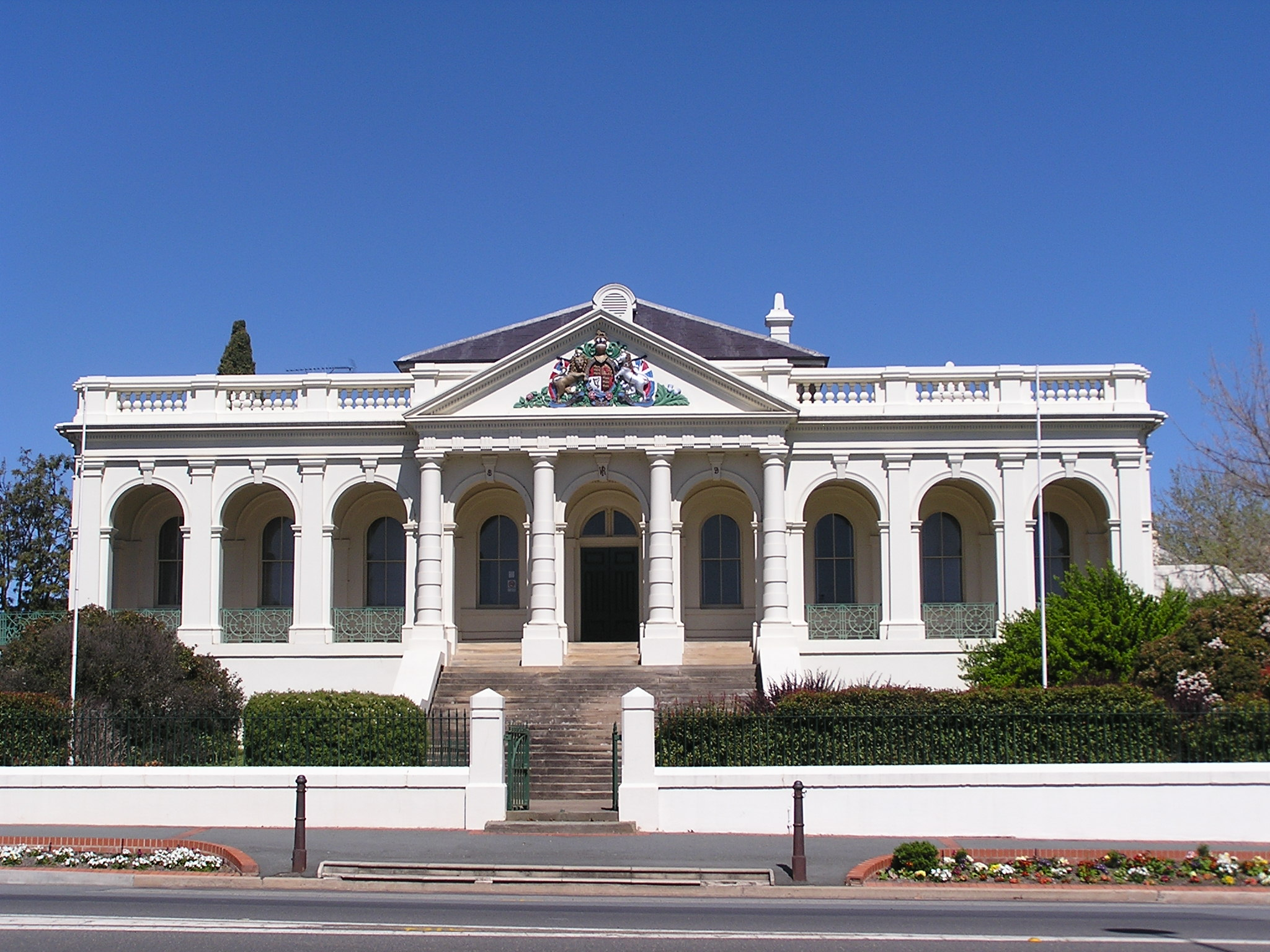
Yass Court House was opened in 1880

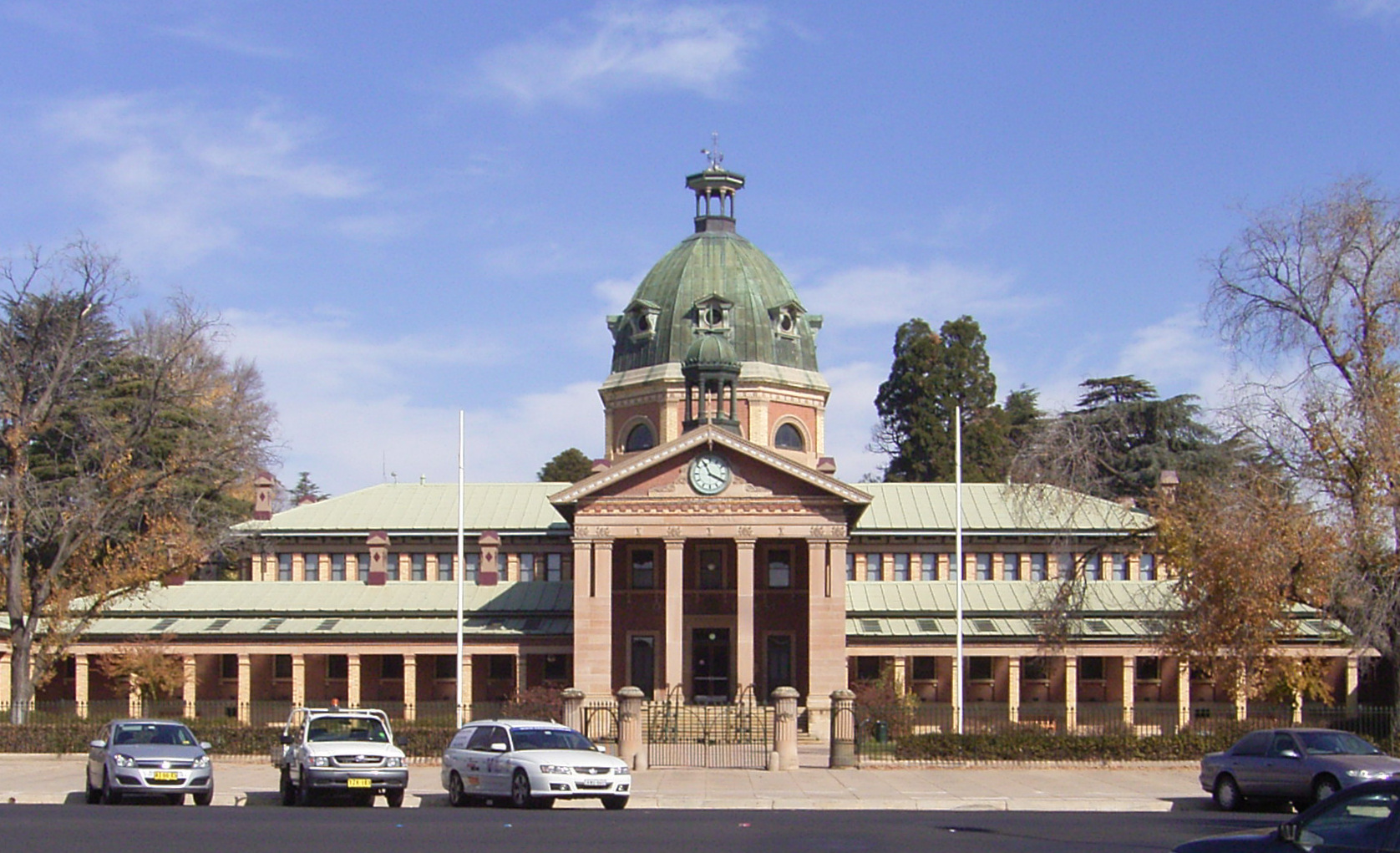
Bathurst Court House was completed in 1880

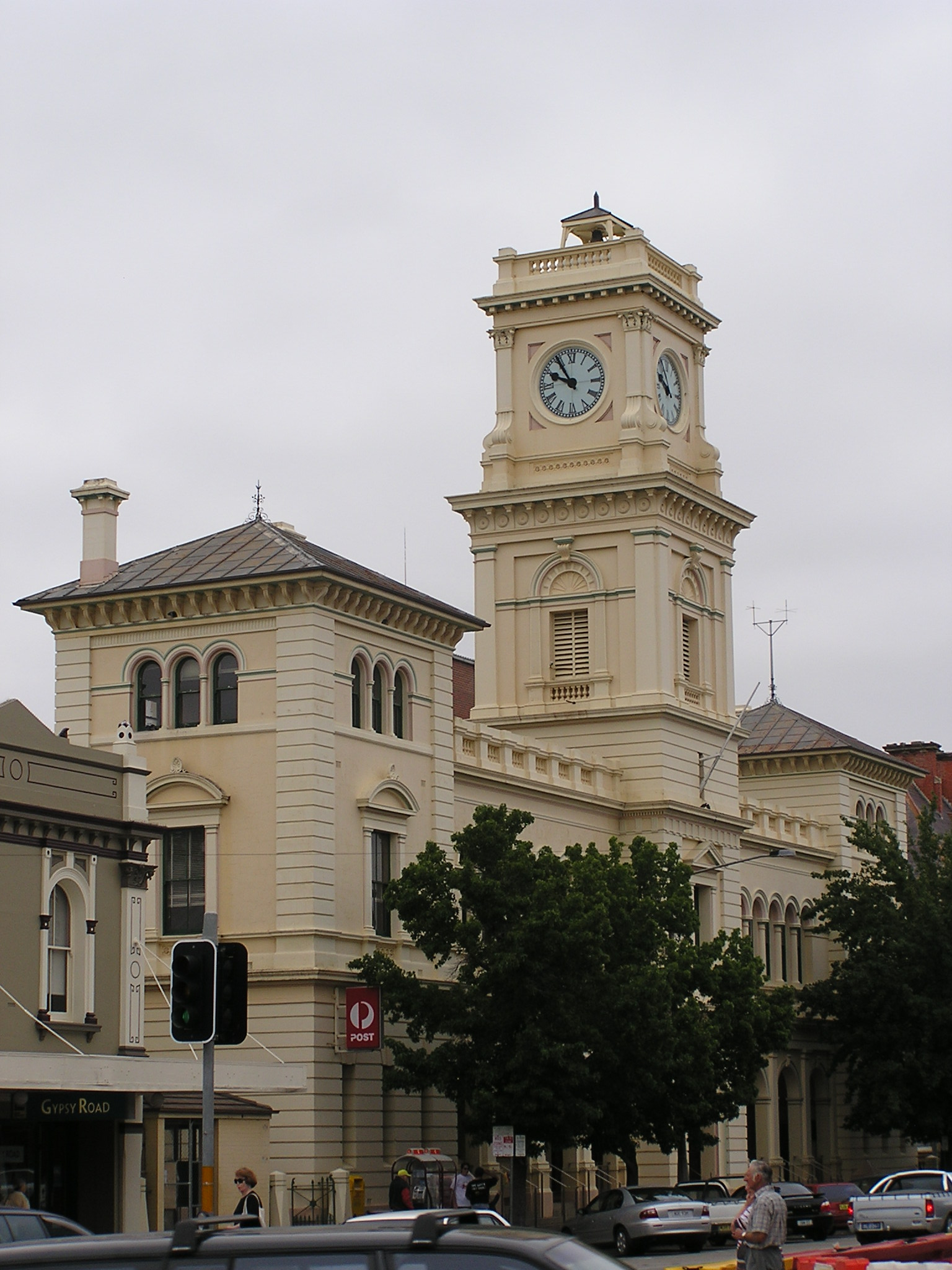
Goulburn Post Office designed 1880/81

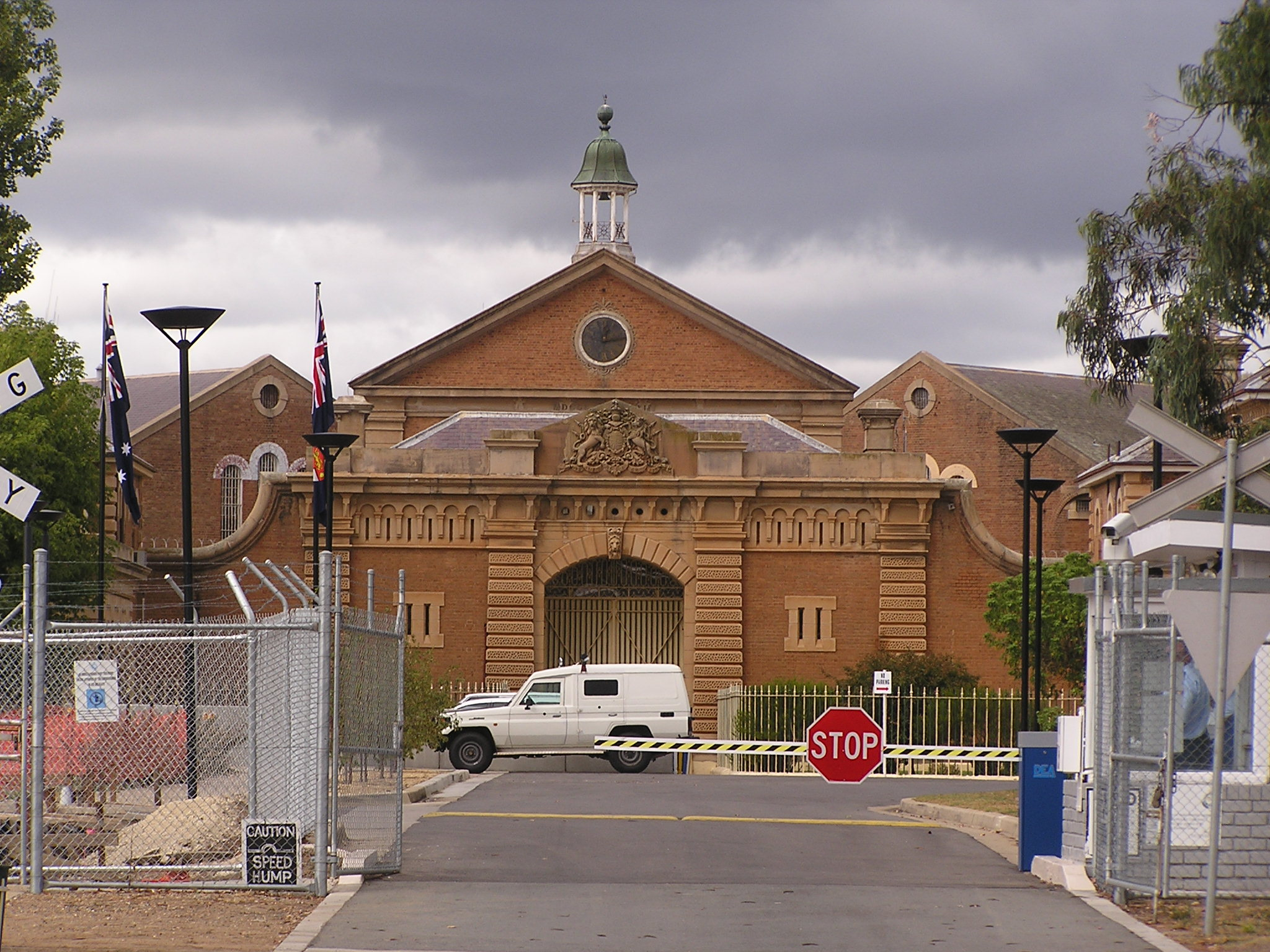
Goulburn Gaol - main buildings designed 1884

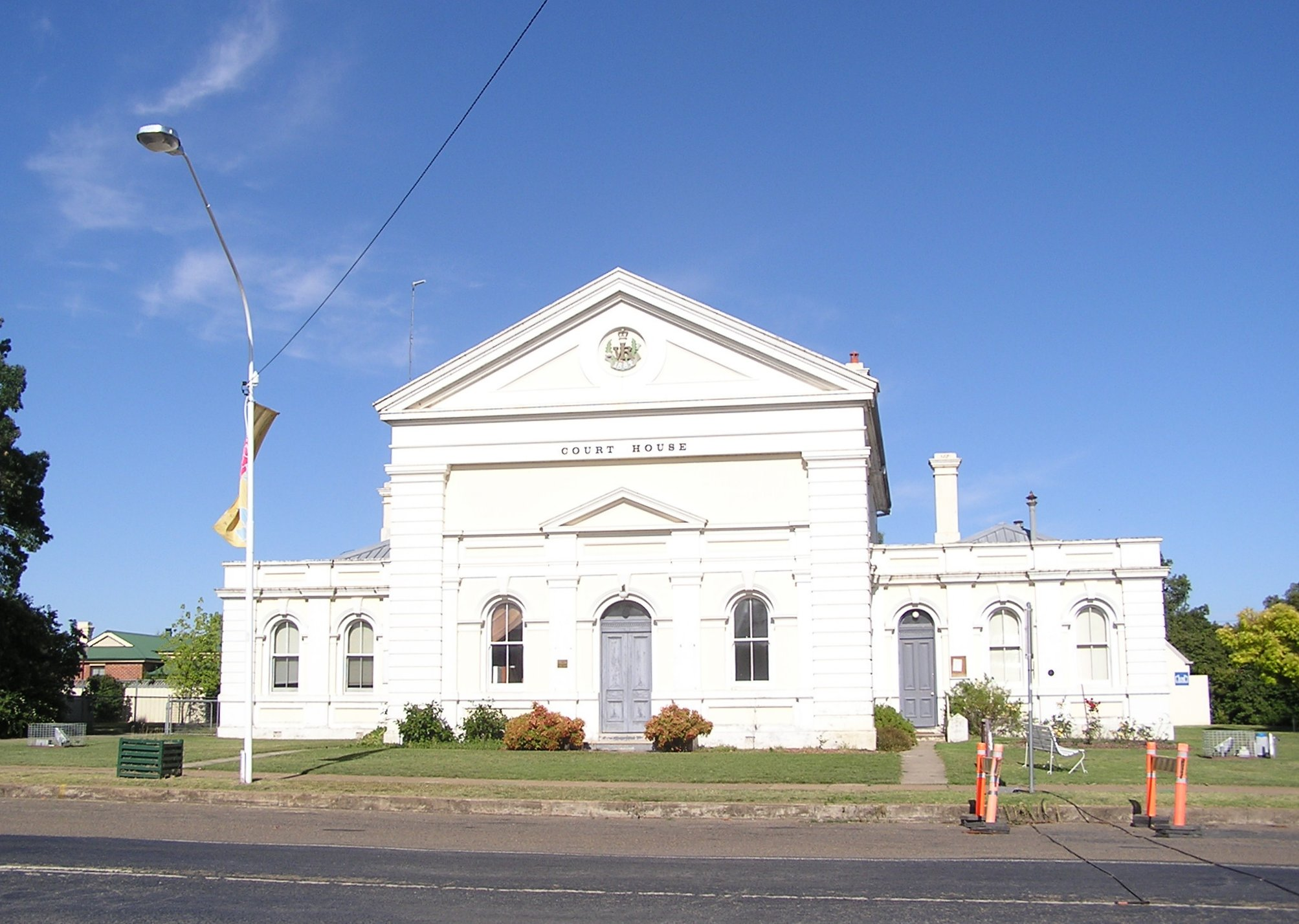
Boorowa Court House completed 1884

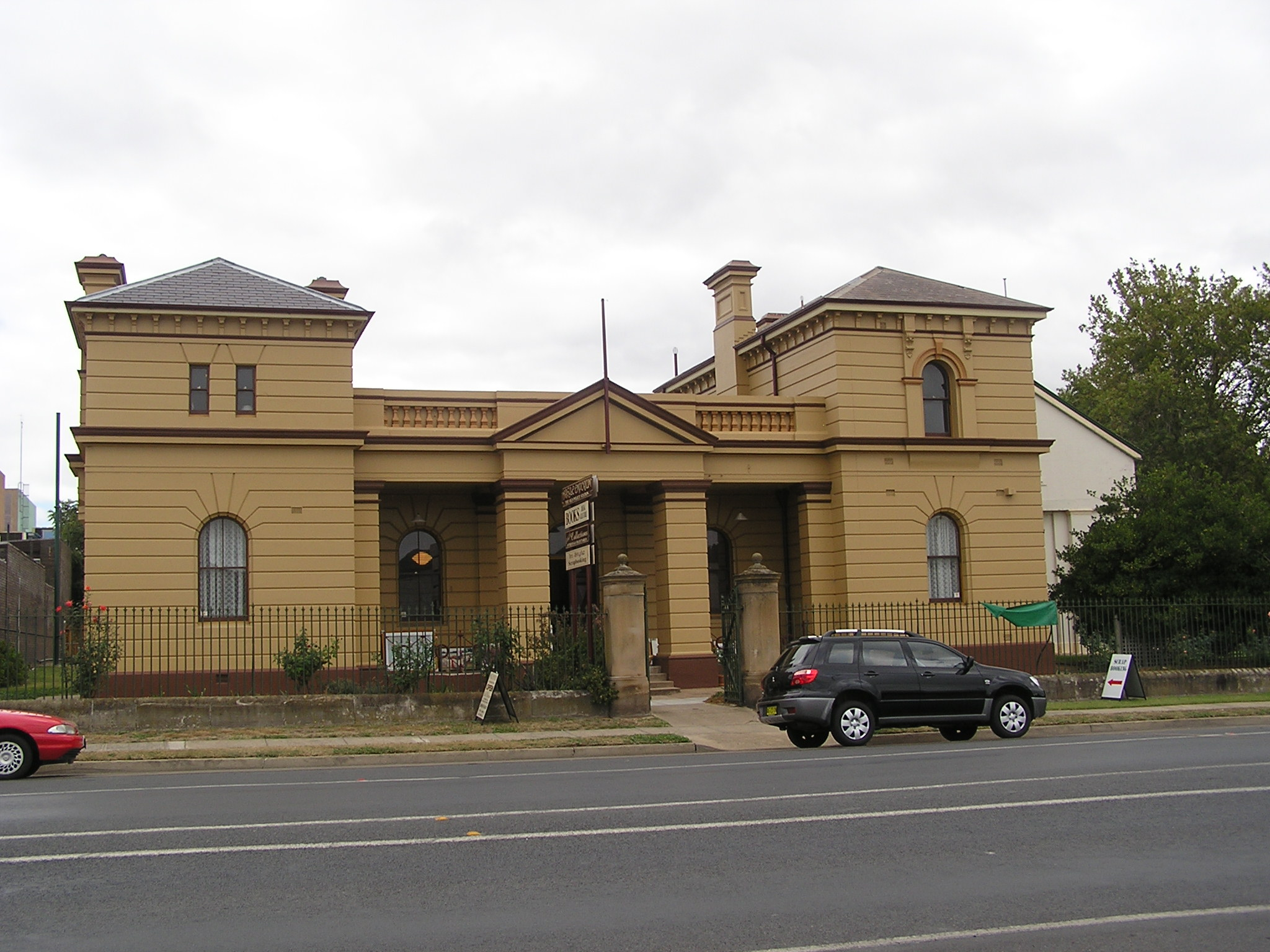
Former Goulburn police station on Sloane Street, opened 1885

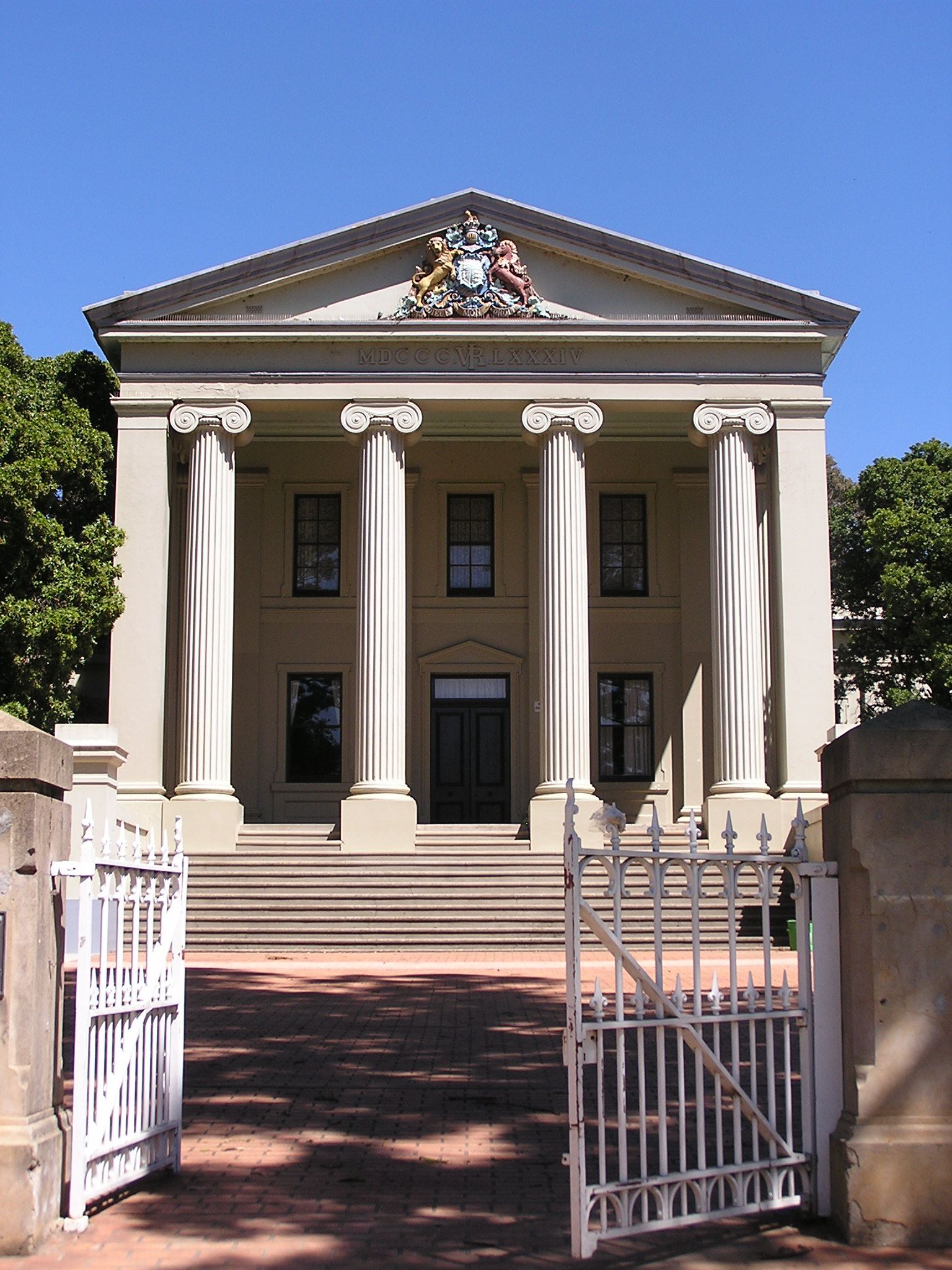
Young Court House completed in 1886

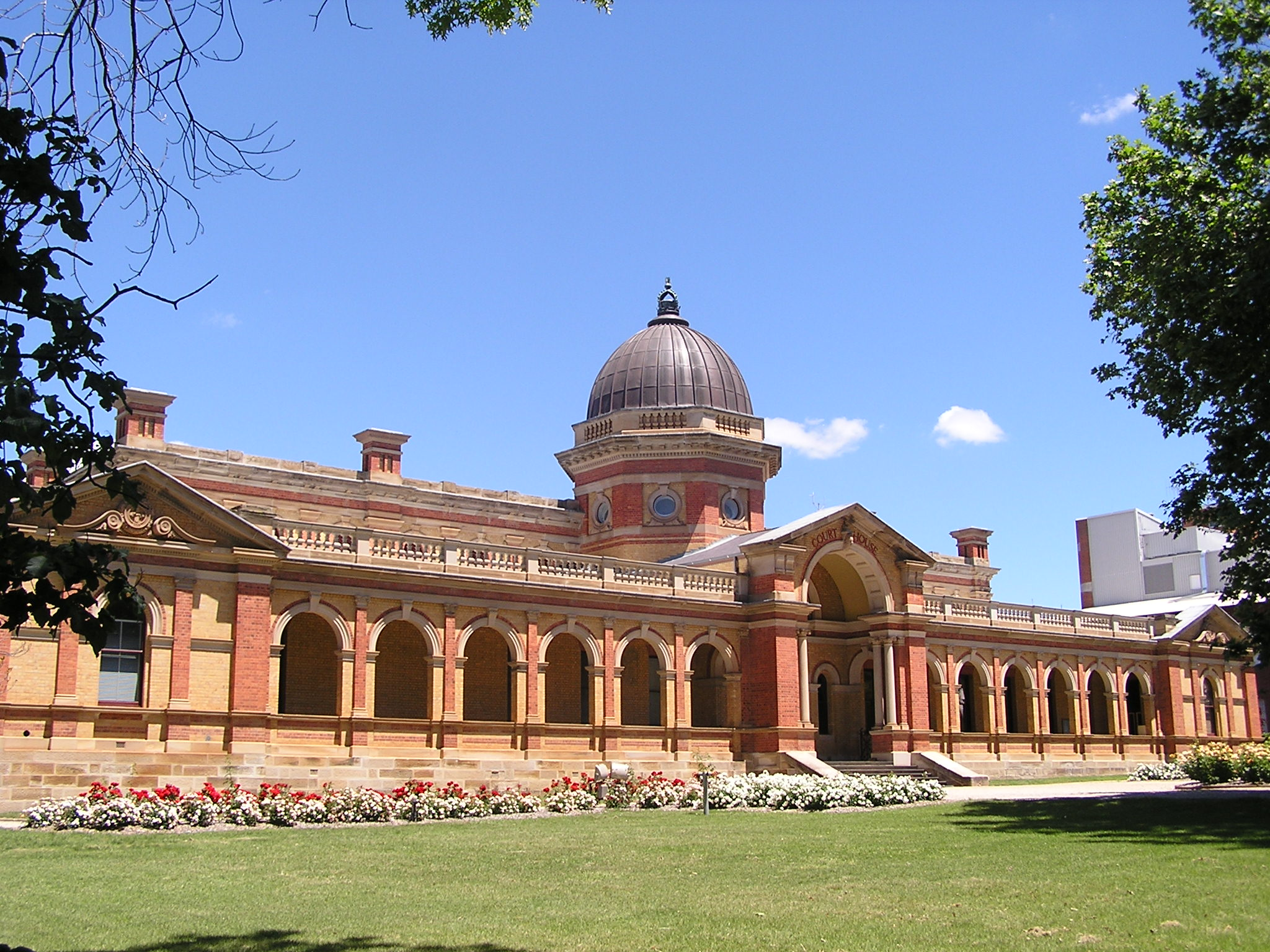
Goulburn Court House; Italianate style; opened 1887

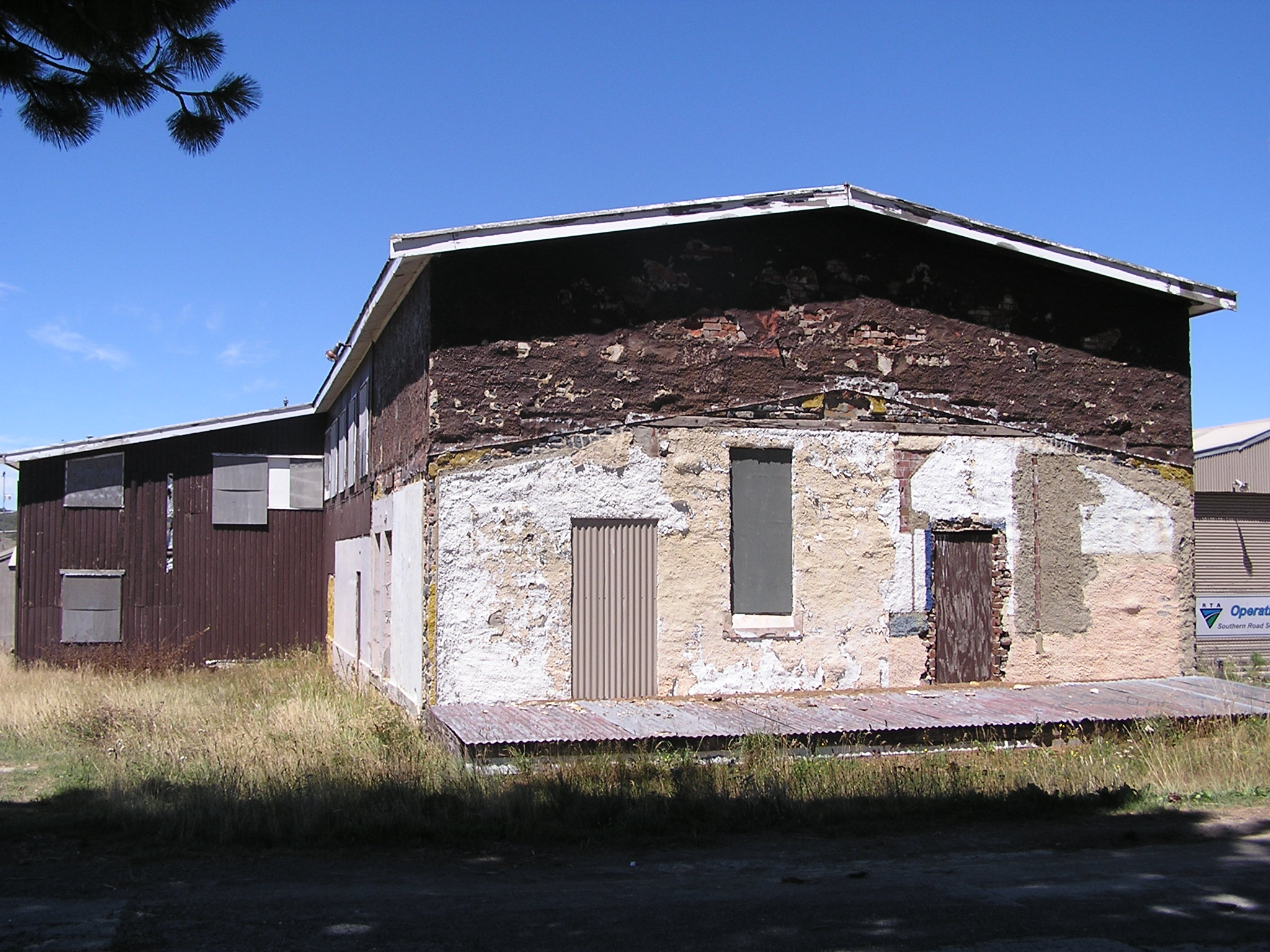
The second Kiandra Court House completed in 1890

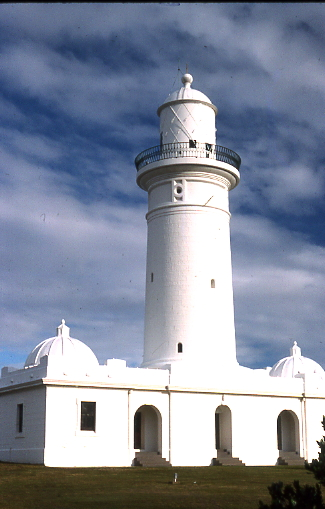
Macquarie Lighthouse, opened in 1883

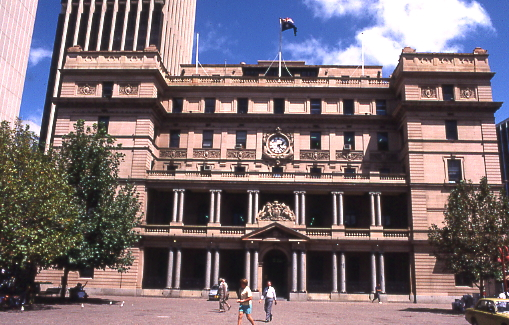
Customs House, Sydney

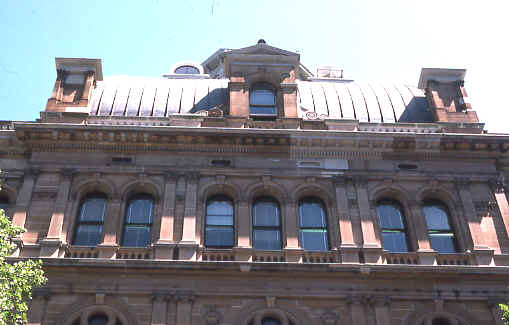
Department of Lands, Sydney

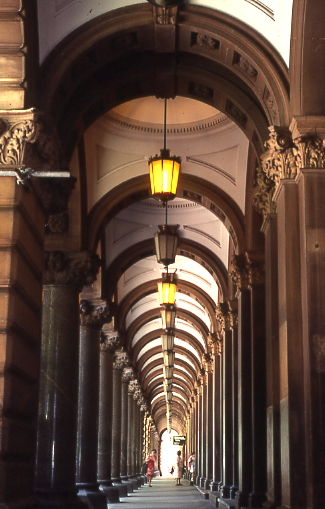
General Post Office, Sydney

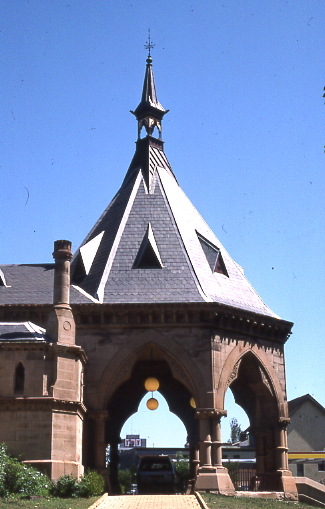
Mortuary Station, Sydney

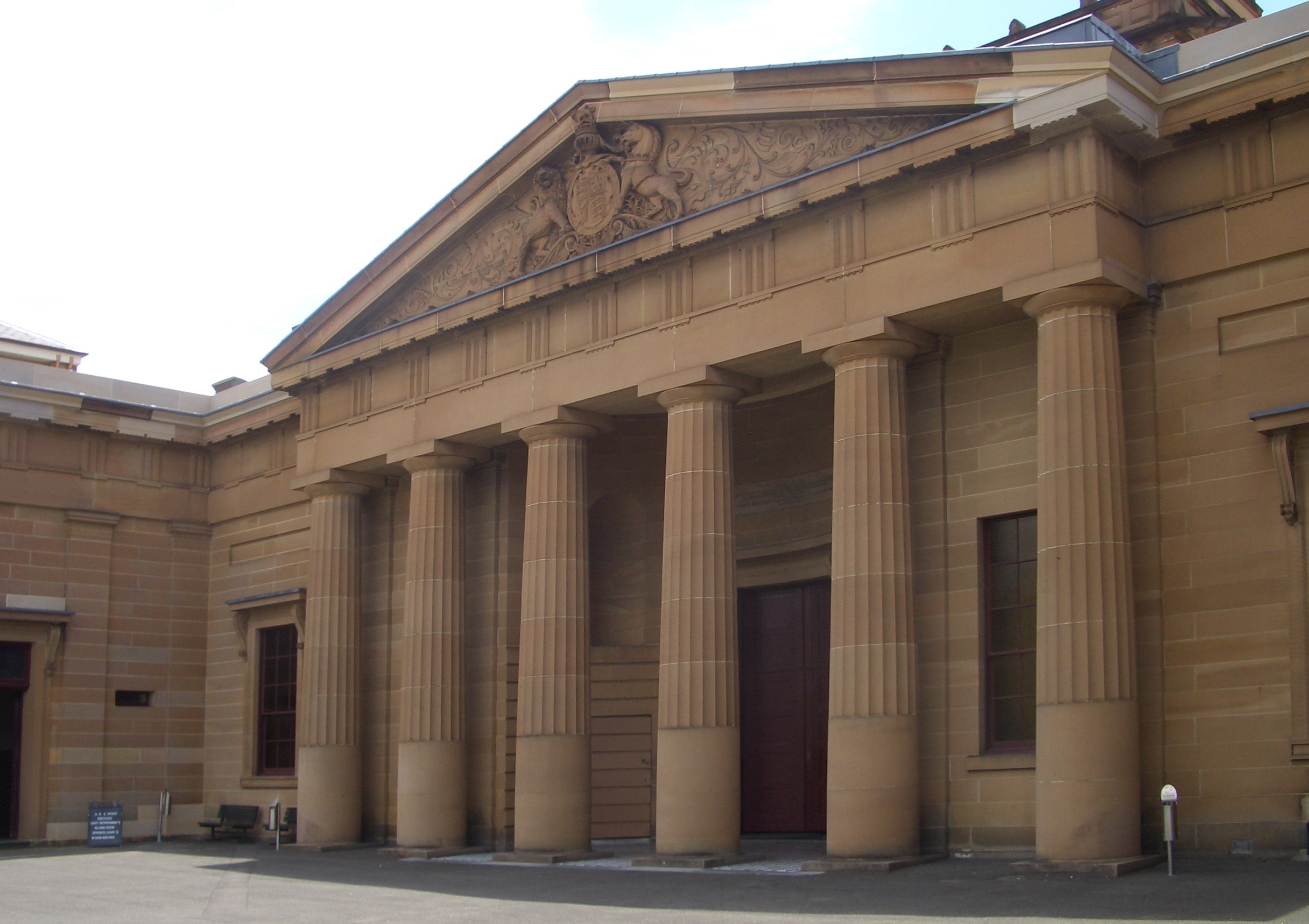
Darlinghurst Court House, Sydney

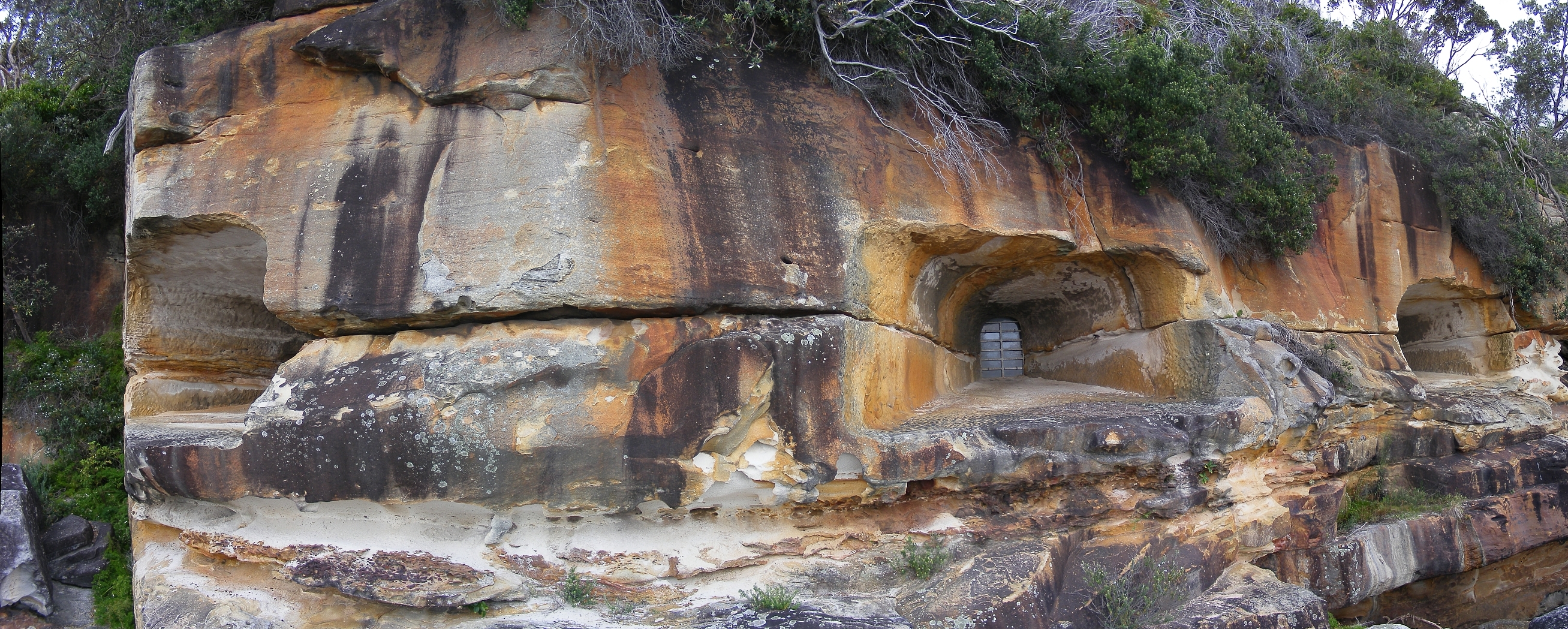
The Beehive Casemate (designed by James Barnet) was carved into the cliff face at Obelisk Bay in Sydney Harbour around 1871
