= Kiandra Courthouse =

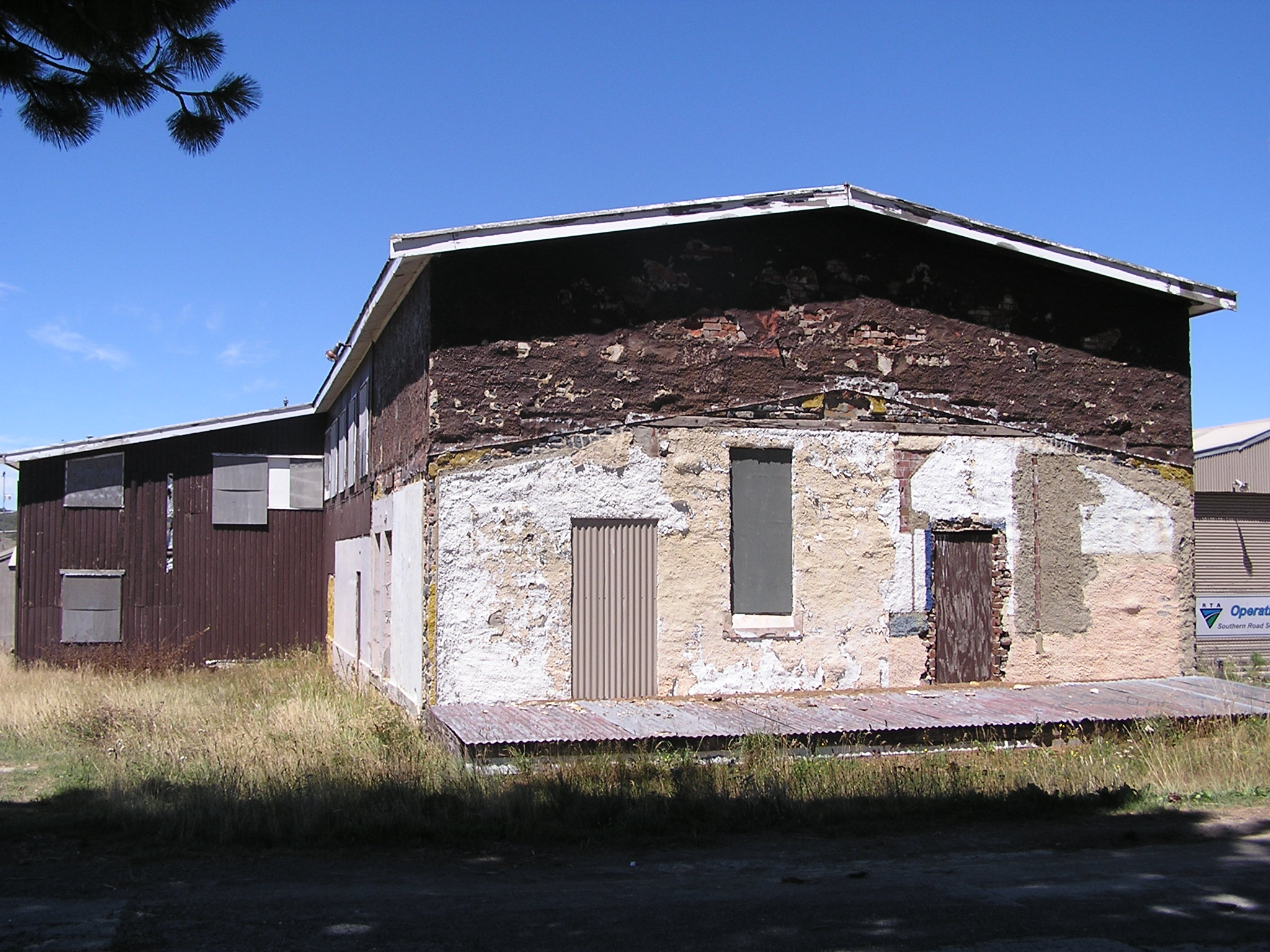
- Kiandra Courthouse in 2006, prior to its restoration as a chalet.

- Location within New South Wales Location within Australia
- 35°52′29″S 148°29′42″E
- Location: Kiandra, Kosciuszko National Park, Snowy Valleys Council, New South Wales, Australia

History
- Built: c. 1890s

Site notes
- Architect: James Barnet
- Owner: Office of Environment and Heritage

New South Wales Heritage Register
- Official name: Kiandra Courthouse/Chalet
- Type: State heritage (built)
- Designated: 2 April 1999
- Reference no.: 994
- Type: Historic site

The Kiandra Courthouse is a heritage-listed former courthouse at Kiandra in the Kosciuszko National Park in Snowy Valleys Council, New South Wales. It is also known as Kiandra Courthouse/Chalet. The property is owned by the Office of Environment and Heritage, an agency of the Government of New South Wales. It was added to the New South Wales State Heritage Register on 2 April 1999.

Kiandra Courthouse was severely damaged by fire during the 2020 Kosciuszko National Park bushfires

== History ==
This was the site of the courthouse and gaol established as part of Kiandra Township with a gold rush in the area in 1859–60. Evidence of the gold rush phenomenon and the former Kiandra Township is represented in the landscape, through the extant remains spread across the former town site.

Kiandra is significant as the site of the first Australian ski club and as probably the first Australian place which promoted snow sports. The 1958 and 1962 Kiandra Chalet building extensions to the original courthouse is a typical example of the KSPT promoted State Park Alpine style. The remnant chalet is important as one of the few remnant buildings of Kiandra's resort/Snowy Mountains Scheme era, and therefore is a twentieth century link with the nineteenth century pioneer snow sports in Australia. Later, the building was used as a place of accommodation for generations who stayed at the chalet for recreation or during the construction of the Snowy Hydro Scheme.

In 2000 Heritage Council approval was given for the removal of single storey additions, to return the building to the original courthouse, as well as to repair roofing and guttering to reduce water ingress.

In 2013 the Heritage Council approved the adaptive re-use of the courthouse and chalet, including a new accommodation and services building, including removal of the existing shed structures surrounding it.

However, in early January 2020, a bushfire was occurring the area means that the courthouse had been destroyed and the glass was melted by the flames. It also occurred in nearby huts and near the town of Batlow.

== Description ==
=== Setting ===
A large mature Western Yellow pine (Pinus ponderosa) survives on the road frontage of the former courthouse / chalet. This is one of three such trees in this location. Due to deteriorating condition, two of these pines were removed after a 2009 inspection (Tumut Region Tree Surgery, 27/10/2017). This remaining pine tree retains value as a landmark, literally marking the site of the courthouse/chalet on the flattish road landscape.

The courthouse is on the eastern side of the Snowy Mountains Highway, Kiandra, within the Kosciuszko National Park.

=== Buildings ===
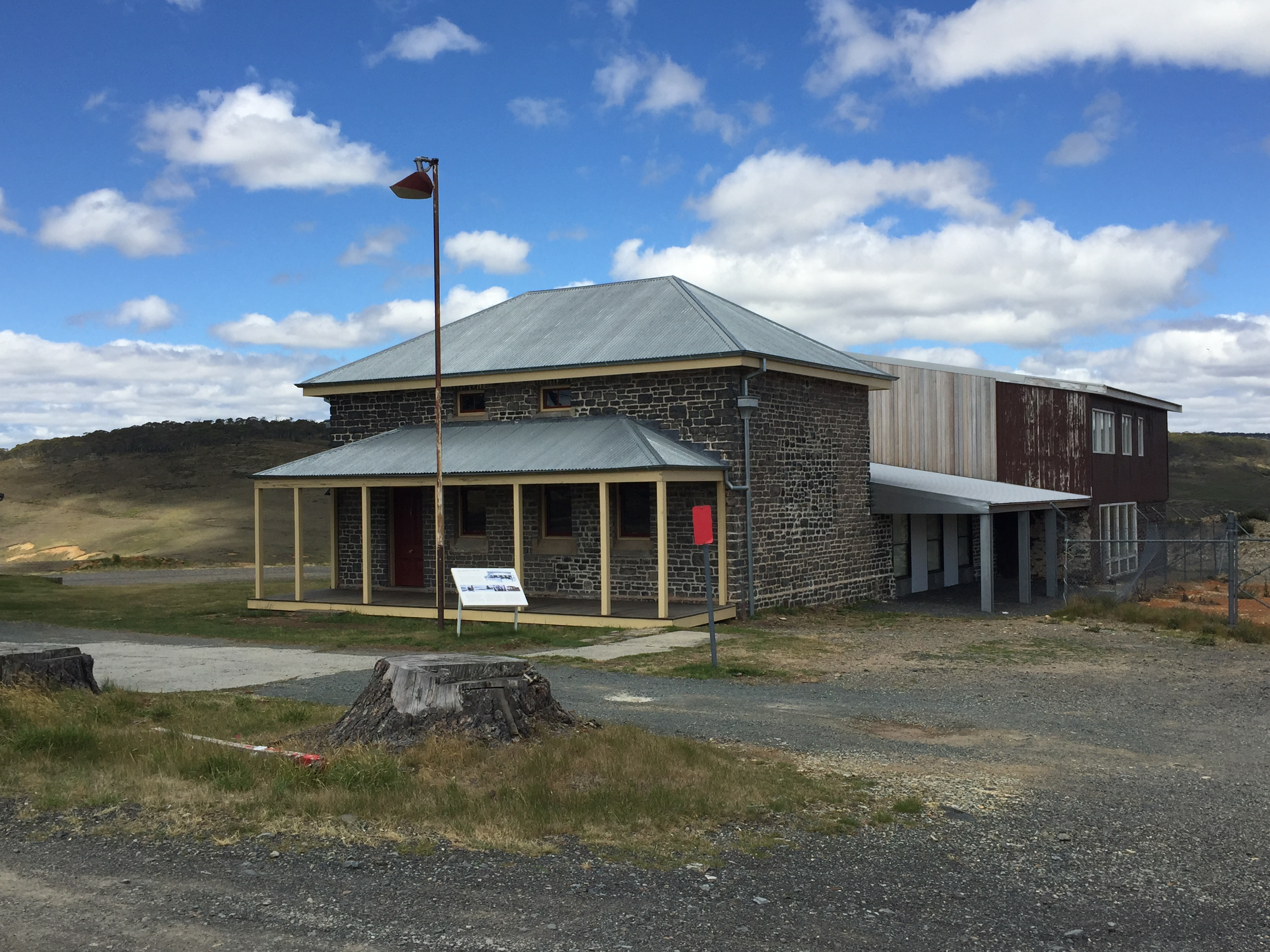
The former courthouse at Kiandra, New South Wales, in 2016

The stone building fronting the highway consists of the 1890s courthouse and associated police quarters (police cell) the courtroom and the chalet living room. The original courthouse was the first substantial public building in the town and the product of the office of the noted late-nineteenth century NSW Colonial Architect, James Barnet.

In the 1950s and 1960s the building was modified and expanded and the original courthouse fabric was subsumed entirely by extensions to the ground floor and addition of a first floor. These additions were timber clad with skillion roofs, in the established Kosciuszko State Park Trust Style.

The Department of Main Roads started using the building as the base for its snow clearing operations from 1971 until they vacated the building around 1999. From 1999 the NSW National Parks & Wildlife Service removed some sections of the deteriorated 1960s fabric and boarded up the building. The courthouse remained unused until 2010 when the courtroom at the front of the building was restored.

=== Modifications ===
In the 1950s and 1960s the building was modified and expanded and the original courthouse fabric was subsumed entirely by extensions to the ground floor and addition of a first floor. These additions were timber clad with skillion roofs, in the established Kosciuszko State Park Trust Style.

The Department of Main Roads started using the building as the base for its snow clearing operations from 1971 until they vacated the building around 1999. From 1999 the NPWS removed some sections of the deteriorated 1960s fabric and boarded up the building. The Courthouse remained unused until 2010 when the courtroom at the front of the building was restored.

== Heritage listing ==
Kiandra Courthouse was listed on the New South Wales State Heritage Register on 2 April 1999.
