= Beehive Casemate =

Rock carving in Sydney, Australia

Coordinates: 33°49′39″S 151°16′5″E

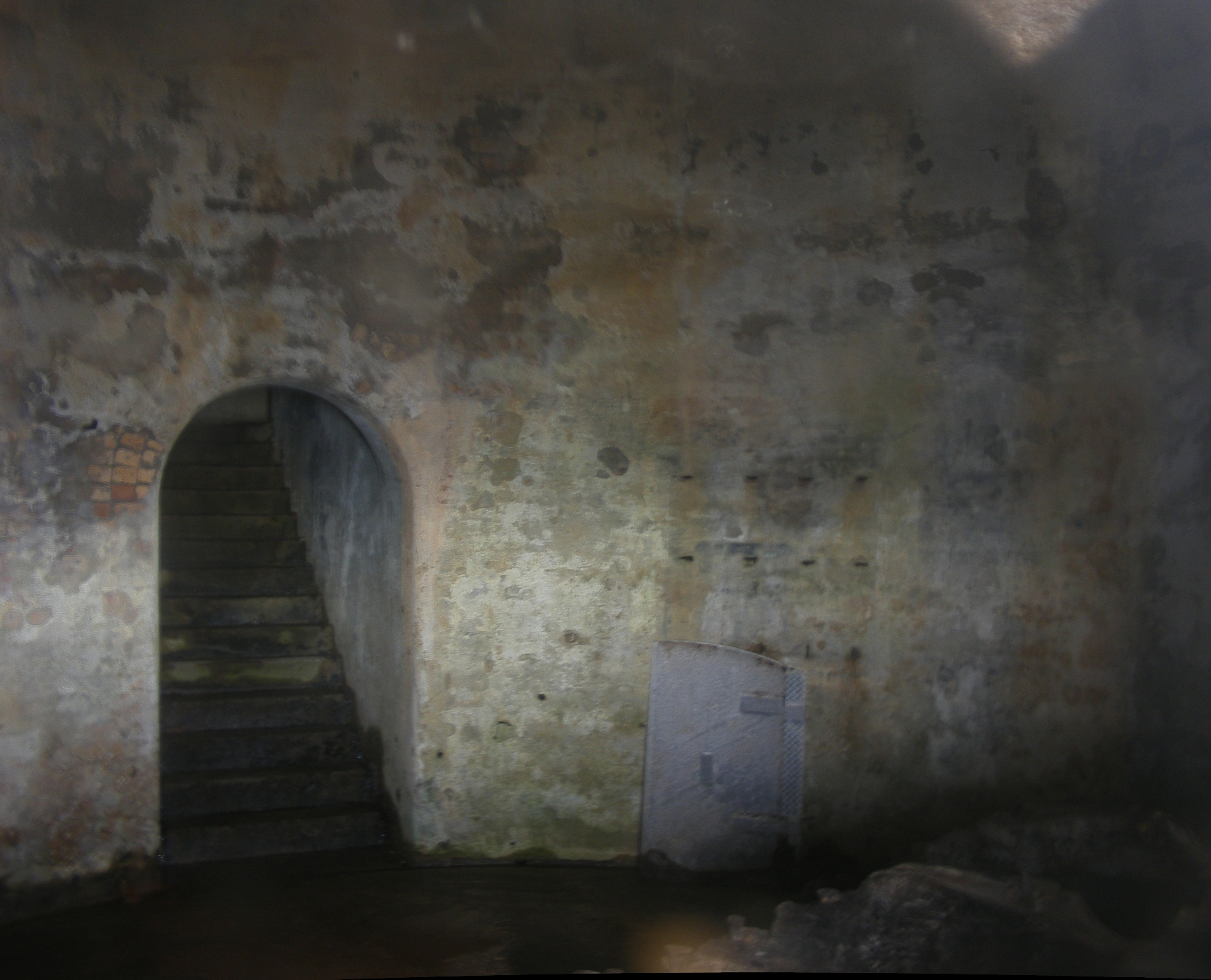
One of three chambers/gun emplacements within the fortification

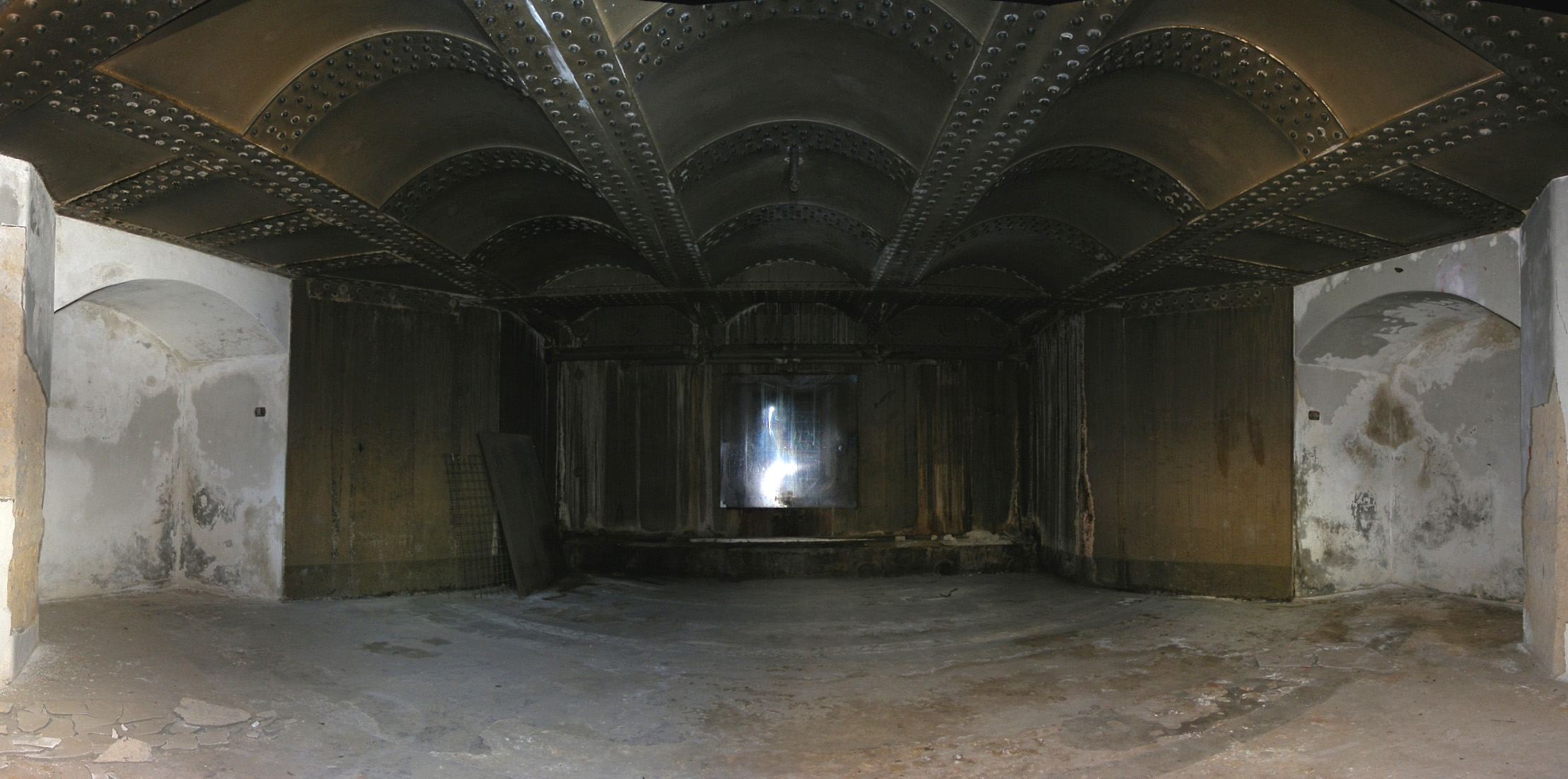
A larger fortification located above and adjacent to the Beehive Casemate in Obelisk Bay

Beehive Casemate is a historical fortification located on the banks of Obelisk Bay, in Sydney Harbour, New South Wales, Australia. It is part of the Sydney Harbour National Park.

== Description and history ==
Construction of the casement began in 1871 and was completed in 1874. The fort was constructed under the supervision of colonial architect James Barnet. The underground casemate was one of the first to be locally designed and built after the withdrawal of British troops in 1870 and the Cardwell Reforms. The fortification contains three domed chambers that were used as gun emplacements. Each chamber had a small opening or window for the gun to fire through with each window looking out towards the Sydney Heads. The underground chambers were made of brick and mortar and were built into the excavated cavities in the sandstone bedrock. They were intended to fire on enemy ships as they navigated the passages around Sow and Pigs Reef, within the entrance to Sydney Harbour.

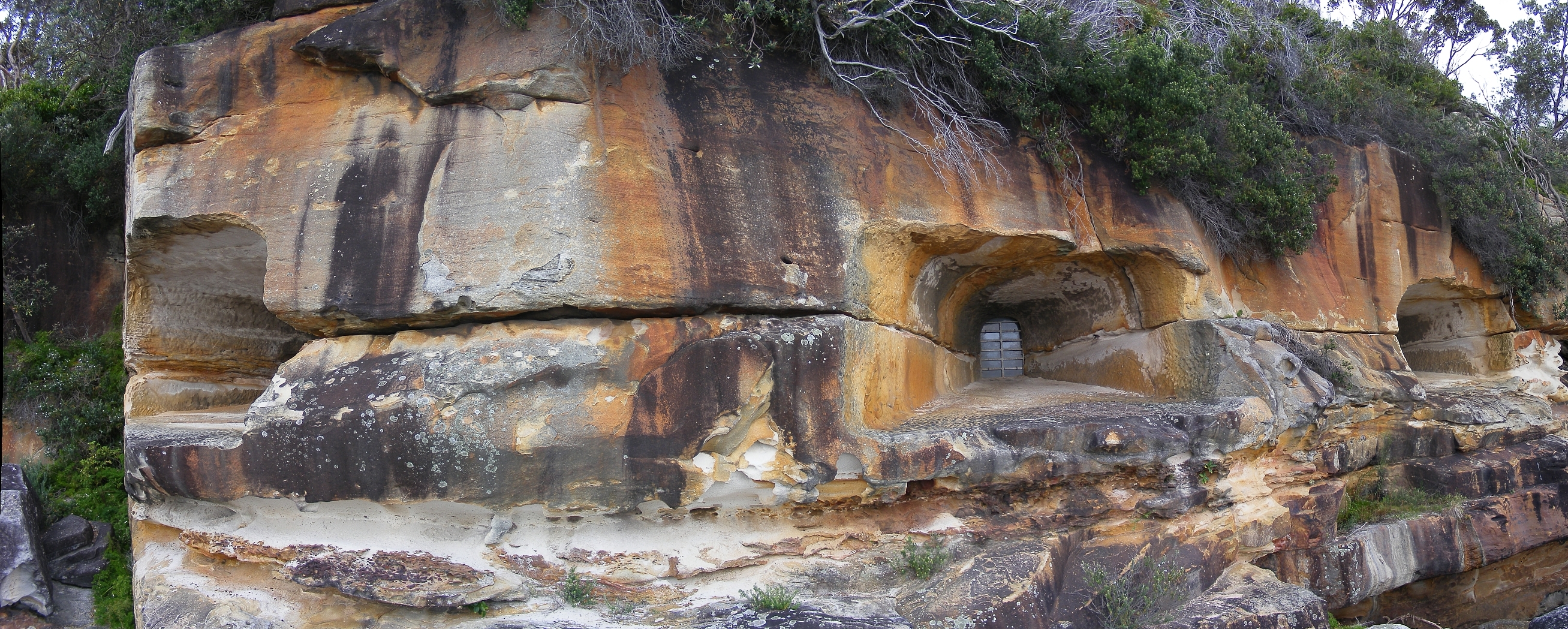
The Beehive Casemate was carved into the cliff face at Obelisk Bay on Sydney Harbour in 1871
