= Kiandra =

- Town
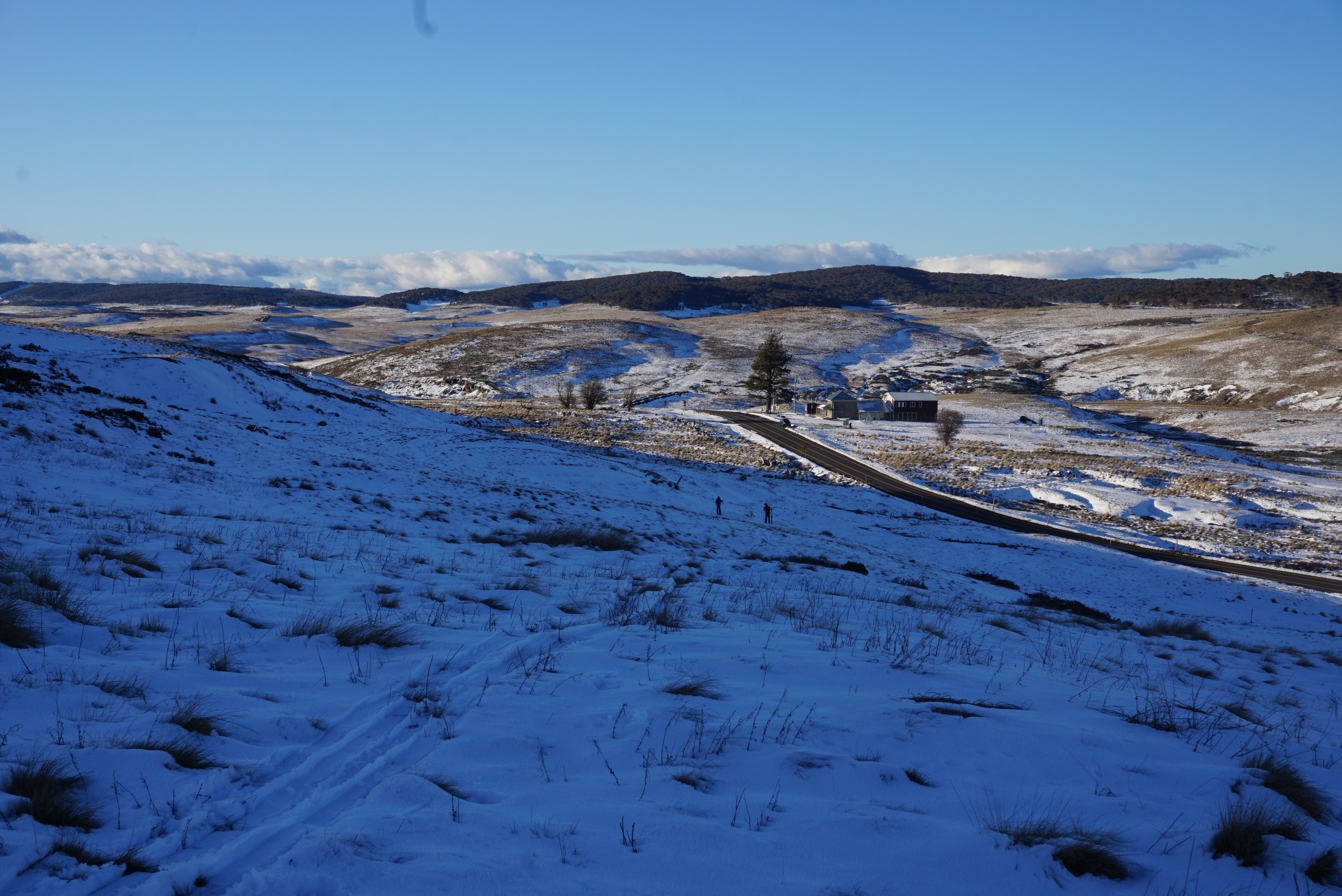
- View over Kiandra from a nearby hill

- Coordinates: 35°53′S 148°30′E
- Country: Australia
- State: New South Wales
- LGA: Snowy Monaro Regional Council
- Location: 90 km (56 mi) NW of Cooma
- Established: 1839

Government
  - State electorate: Monaro
  - Federal division: Eden-Monaro
- Elevation: 1,400 m (4,600 ft)
- Postcode: 2630
- Mean max temp: 12.7 °C (54.9 °F)
- Mean min temp: 0.9 °C (33.6 °F)
- Annual rainfall: 1,561.2 mm (61.46 in)

Kiandra is an abandoned gold mining town and the birthplace of Australian skiing. The town is situated in the Snowy Mountains of New South Wales, Australia, in the Snowy Monaro Regional Council inside the Kosciuszko National Park. Its name is a corruption of Aboriginal 'Gianderra' for 'sharp stones for knives'. It was earlier called Gibson's Plains, named after a Dr. Gibson, a settler in the district in 1839. For a century (until the establishment of Cabramurra), Kiandra was Australia's highest town.

Kiandra lies approximately 90 kilometres (56 mi) north-west of Cooma on the Snowy Mountains Highway between Adaminaby and Talbingo. It sits at 1,400 metres (4,600 ft) above sea level and is situated on a high, treeless ridge on the banks of the Eucumbene River, which is snow-covered during winter and is subject to high winds. It lies in the Australian Alps montane grasslands bioregion according to Interim Biogeographic Regionalisation for Australia.

After decades of decline, restoration work on the remaining buildings at Kiandra took place from 2009 to 2020, including work on the historic Kiandra Courthouse Chalet and Wolgal Lodge fishing cottage being conducted by the NSW National Parks and Wildlife Service (NPWS) and volunteers, enabling occasional amenities and limited accommodation at Kiandra.

The remaining buildings in the town were either destroyed or severely damaged during the 2019–20 Australian bushfire season.

== History ==
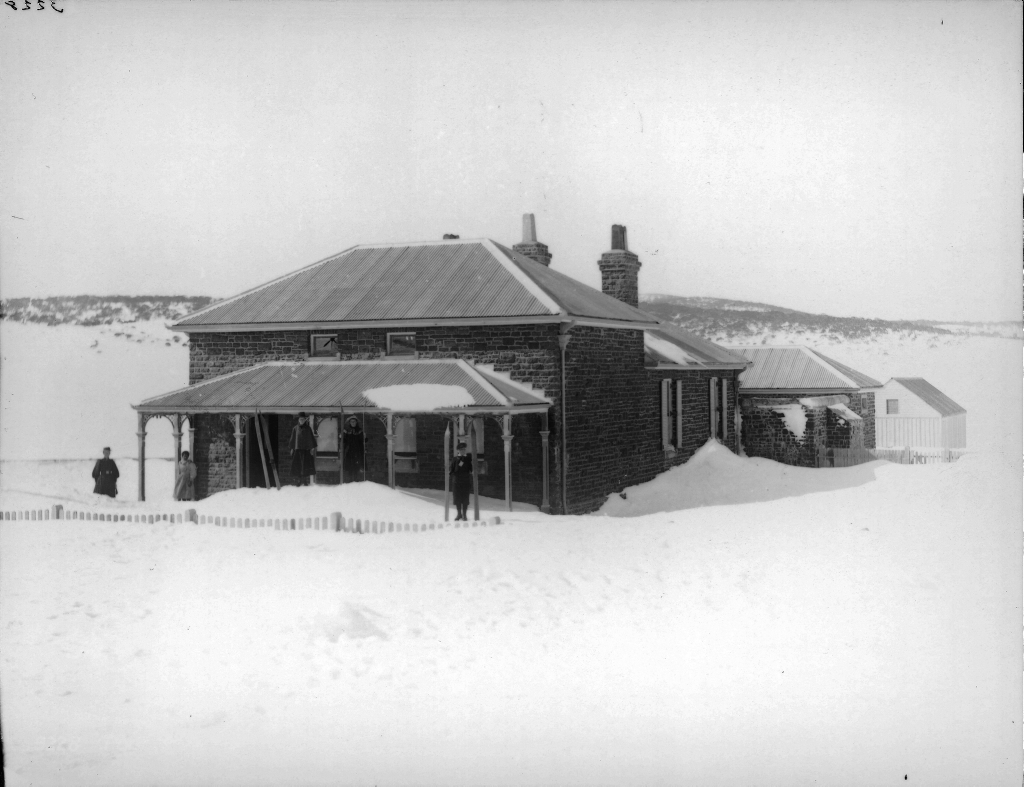
Kiandra Police Station

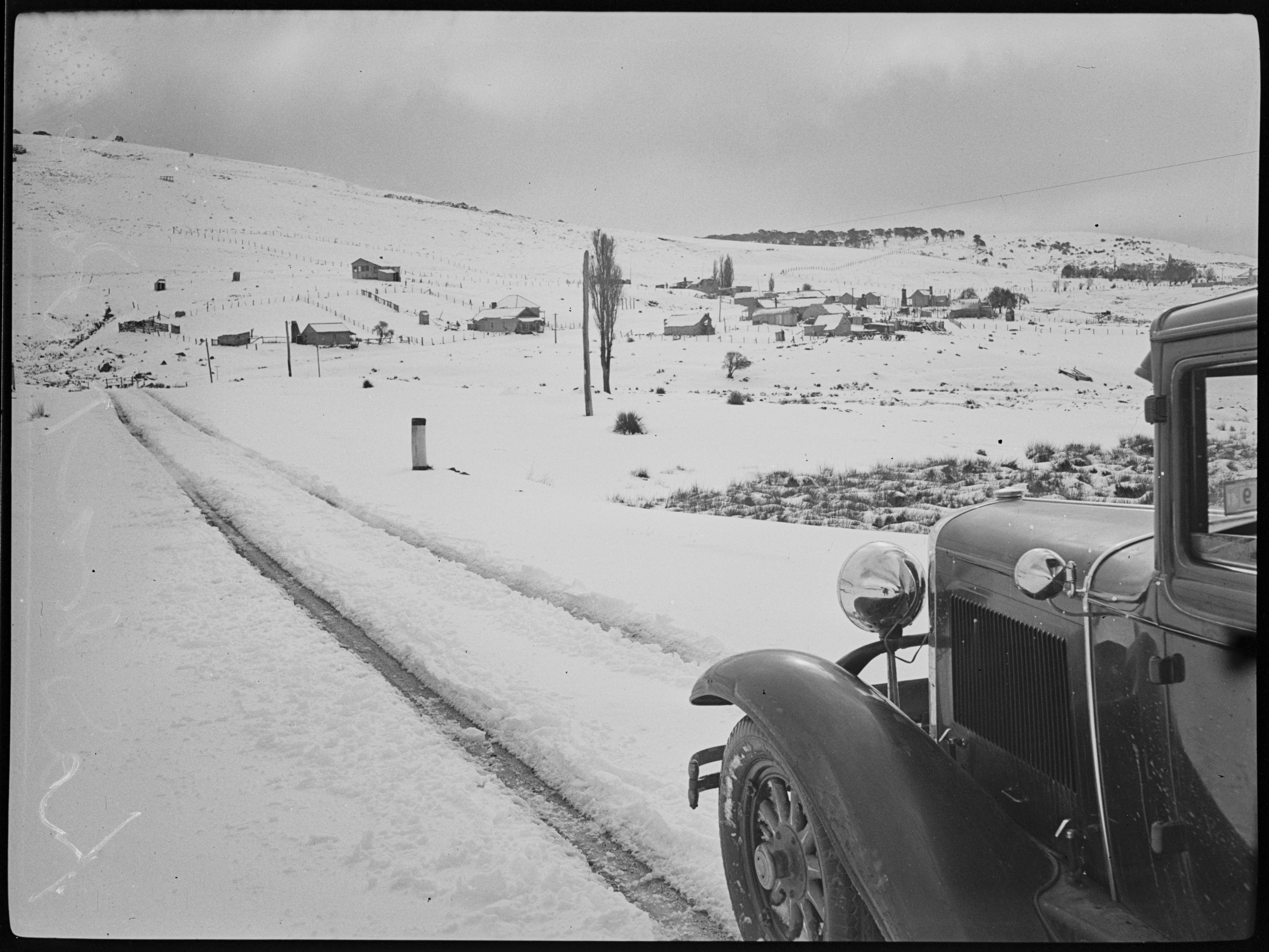
Kiandra township, New South Wales, 21 June 1941

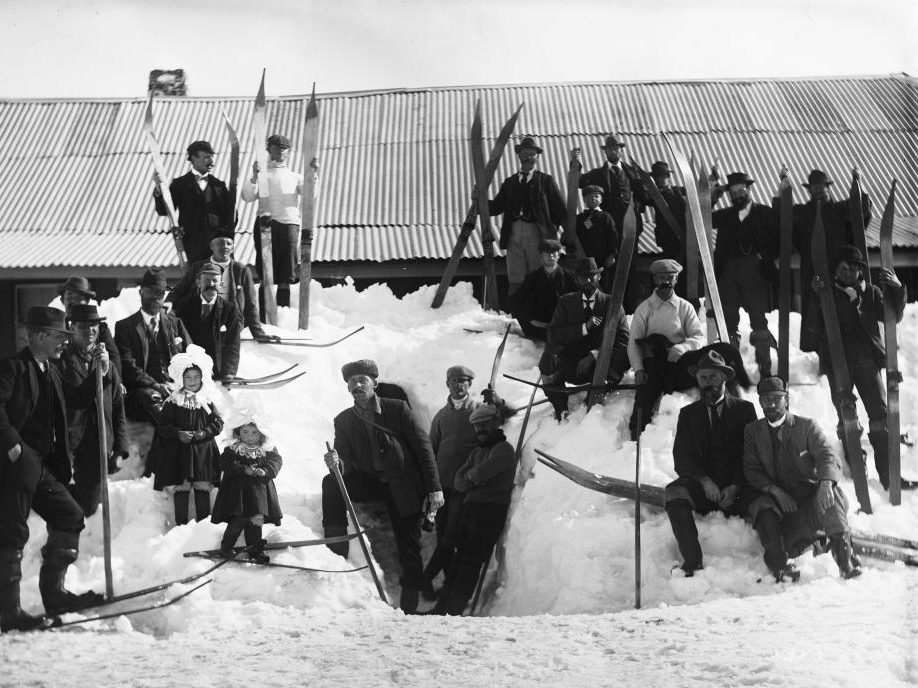
Kiandra Snow Shoe Carnival 1900

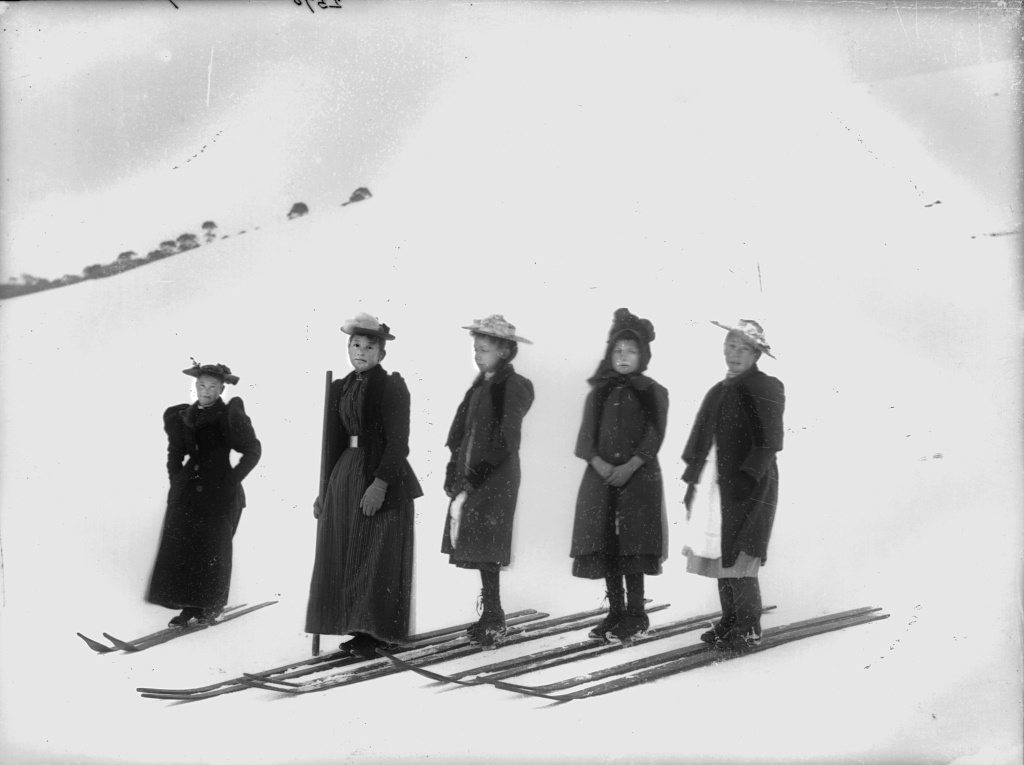
The Start of the Girls' Snowshoe Race

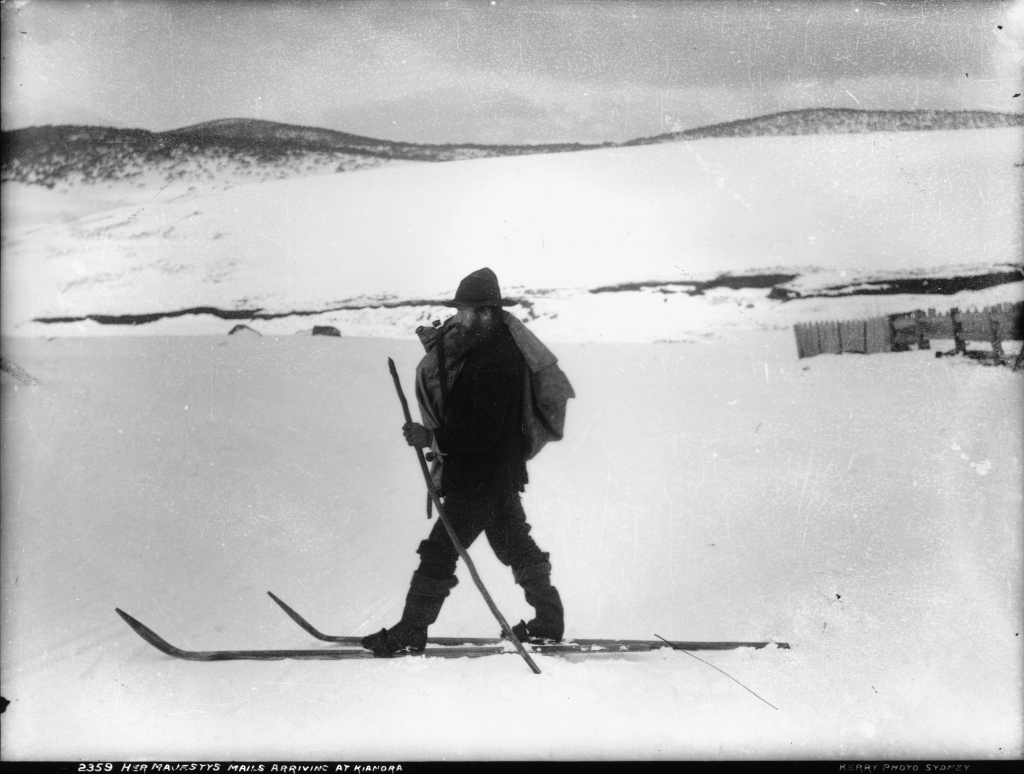
The mailman arrives at Kiandra

=== Goldrush ===
In November 1859, gold was discovered by mountain cattlemen, the Pollock brothers, and by March 1860, some 10,000 miners and storekeepers had raced to the scene. Initial returns were very good. A 9 kg nugget was discovered in river deposits under what became known as New Chum Hill. Kiandra post office opened on 1 June 1860 and it is estimated that the area at its peak accommodated around 15,000 people, served by 25 stores, 13 bakers, 16 butchers, 14 pubs, several banks and four blacksmiths. Nevertheless, by 1861, the Sydney Morning Herald was reporting a "mass exodus" and the easy pickings were exhausted.

Significant numbers of Chinese people worked the Kiandra goldfields. Chinese miners built Three Mile Dam in 1882 to assist with sluicing operations at "New Chum Hill". The scenic lake still exists and now supplies Selwyn Snowfields with its snow-making water requirements. Wikipedia's Chinese site lists Kiandra as 奇安德拉 (Qi An De La).

The last mining operations finally ceased around 1905. Official total production recorded was 48,676 kg.

In 1890 the second courthouse to be built in the township was constructed. The building included police barracks and was used more for its police rather than court function. It remained Kiandra's police station until 1937, later to become the Kiandra Chalet.

A 'battery stamper' and other mining relics recovered locally are situated on the road to Cabramurra below New Chums Hill, close to the NPWS entry booth (which is only attended during the snow season). This stamper was used to crush rock and quartz in order to free the embedded gold.

The Wig and Pen Brewery in Canberra commemorates this chapter in Australia's High Country history with a pale golden pilsner beer in the Czech style, named "Kiandra Gold".

=== Skiing ===
Kiandra is often isolated by deep snow which made it inaccessible during winter. In 1861, Norwegian miners introduced recreational skiing to the snowbound mining settlement after manufacturing over forty pairs of both short skis, known as "skates". and the longer "snow shoes" during the months before the first winter snow. To avoid confusion with a conventional skate, the skates were described as (two palings turned up at the front end and about four foot long). There were no fence palings or posts in Kiandra in 1861.

Ski races were held annually on Township Hill at Kiandra, which led to the founding of the Kiandra Snow Shoe Club—reportedly becoming the "world's longest continuously running ski club" as it evolved into the present-day Kiandra Pioneer Ski Club in Perisher Valley, NSW. Whether the club is the first of its kind has been subject to debate. At one time, the poet Banjo Paterson was a vice president. The Club held perhaps the first international ski race carnival in 1908. In 1927, William Hughes, a member of the club, together with four members of the Ski Club of Australia made the first historic ski traverse from Kiandra to the Hotel Kosciusko. Their eventful journey is retold in Klaus Hueneke's book "Kiandra to Kosciusko" and was commemorated by 150 ski tourers in 1977 in an event organised by the Kosciusko Huts Association.

The Kiandra courthouse closed as a police station in 1937, and was for a time used as a private residence, before becoming the Kiandra Chalet (until 1953) and later the Kiandra Chalet Hotel, The owner of the Chalet ran a ski rope tow. The Chalet closed in 1973 and the building became a Roads Depot building.

Australia's first T-bar lift was installed on Township Hill in 1957, but in 1978, Kiandra's ski lift operations re-located permanently to nearby Selwyn Snowfields. The T-Bar remained in operation at Mt Selwyn until the 2009 ski season when it was replaced by the Township Triple Chair (retaining the name "Township" in reference to the Kiandra Township hill run).

=== Restoration ===
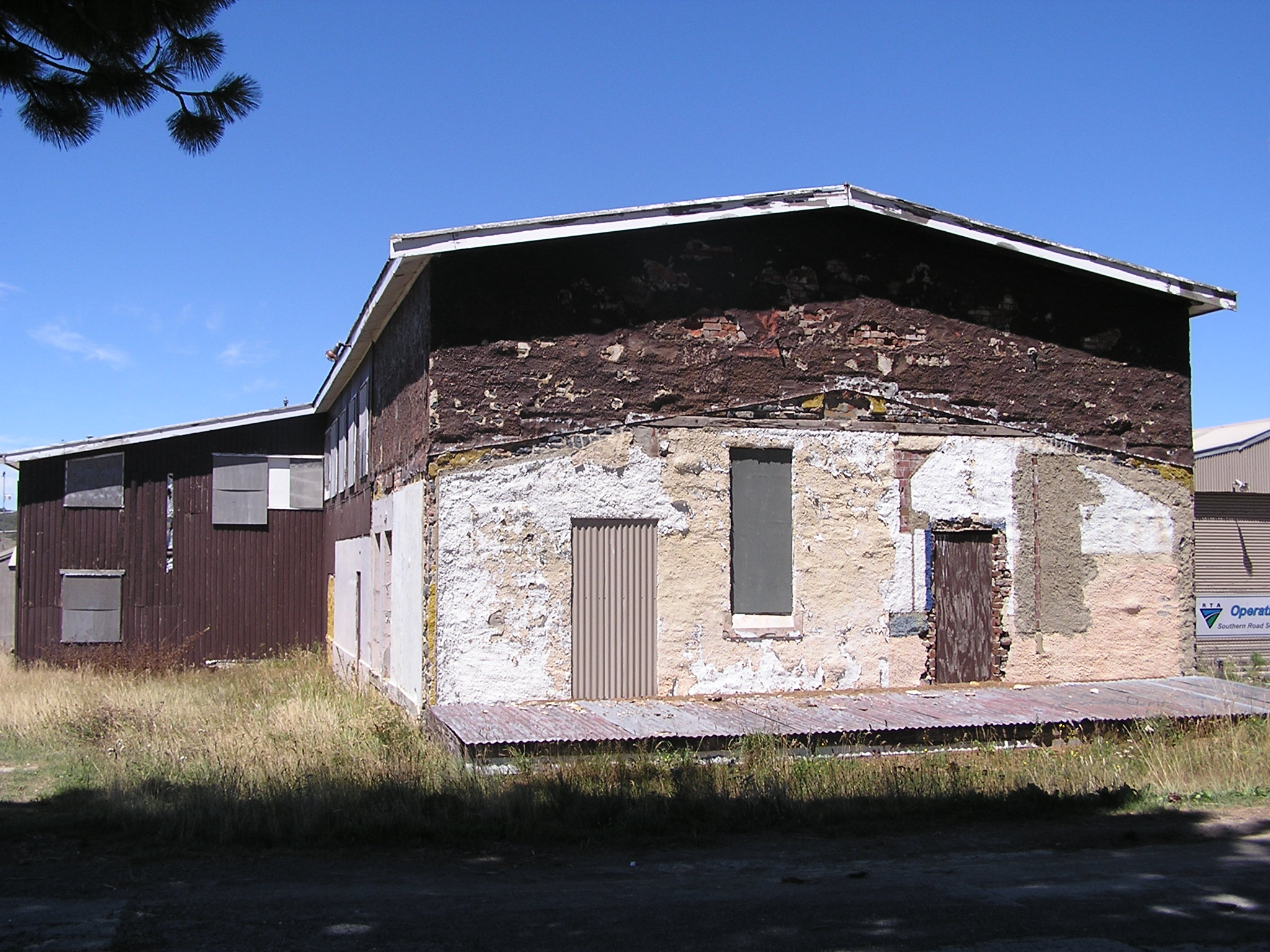
Kiandra courthouse before 2010 restoration

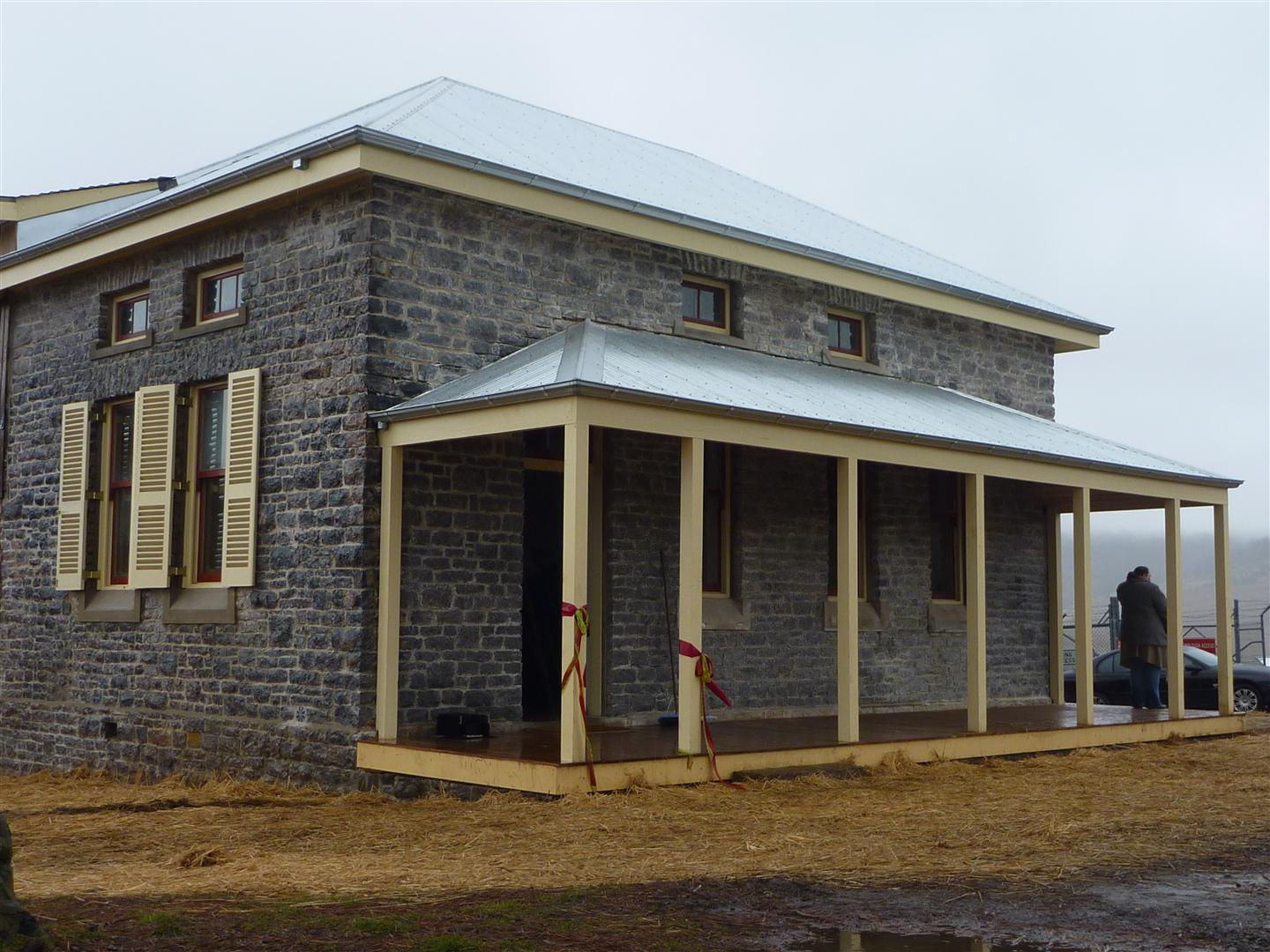
Kiandra courthouse after the 2010 restoration

The last resident left Kiandra in 1974, after which the NPWS took over the town and completed its demolition of most of its buildings. This decision by the NPWS not to preserve much of the human heritage of the township remains a source of resentment in some quarters in the district to this day. Only four buildings from the former township remain intact, together with a collection of ruins and the historic cemetery. The area retains various other relics of Australian pioneer history, including mining equipment, old gravesites and abandoned diggings.

The remaining buildings at Kiandra are of high heritage value and historical walking trails provided information on the former layout and points of interests of the old town. The most substantial remaining building is the former courthouse, which was originally constructed in 1890, and which was partially restored by National Parks in 2010, Stokes Rousseau and carpenters Sean Walker and Barry Ellwood from Furnbiz for use as an interpretive centre. The restored court room was officially opened on 5 May 2010 with some 150 people present for the ceremony. The later additions to the original courthouse at the rear of the building remain in a state of outward disrepair, although National Parks intended to continue the restoration in stages, aiming to preserve the cultural history of the site across its many previous uses.

In 2012, public accommodation returned to Kiandra with the opening of the restored Wolgal Lodge for bookings. The opening of the 1960s fishing cottage was in part conducted to create and demonstrate a market demand for Kiandra-based accommodation, which, according to the Snowy Times, could prove a "market based argument for restoring the Kiandra Courthouse and Chalet for accommodation".

Easter 2013 saw all four of Kiandra's buildings in public use for the first time in decades - with guided tours and exhibitions - including the Matthew's Cottage exhibition and the Pattinson's cottage house museum.

=== 2020 bushfire ===
During the 2019–20 Australian bushfire season, on 3 January 2020, the Dunns Road fire burned from Batlow into Kosciuszko National Park and burning much of the northern part of the park. The courthouse was severely damaged, the fire burning so hot that the glass and aluminium in the windows melted. Wolgal Hut and Pattisons Huts were also feared to have been destroyed.

== Heritage listings ==
The Kosciuszko National Park has a number of heritage-listed sites, including:

- Kiandra: Kiandra Courthouse
- Kiandra: Matthews Cottage

== Kiandra in print, photography and archaeology ==
Historic Kiandra: A Guide to the History of the District, by D. G. Moye (editor) was published by the Cooma-Monaro Historical Society to mark the centenary of the Kiandra Goldrush in 1959, and remains in print.

Australian High Country enthusiast Klause Hueneke has written two books on the Kiandra region: Huts of the High Country, 1982 and Kiandra to Kosciusko, 1987.

The Kiandra Pioneer Ski Club published two histories: Kiandra – Gold Fields to Ski Fields (2006) and Lapland Snow Shoes in Australia (2010).

The poet Barcroft Boake wrote a poem about skiing at Kiandra, entitled "The Demon Snow Shoes: A Legend of Kiandra". Banjo Paterson referenced Kiandra in his poetry - as in A Mountain Station (The Bulletin, 19 December 1891). Patrick White's first novel, Happy Valley (1939), has Kiandra thinly disguised as the township of "Kambala". The 2011 time travel/science fiction adventure novel Falling into History, by Peter Fleming, is partially set in Kiandra.

The Township has been subject to various archaeological studies, including a project by the Australian National University Department of Archaeology and Anthropology under the direction of Drs Mike Smith, Ken Heffernan and Annie Clark in the mid-1990s. The Kiandra Historical Society remains a useful resource of record for the history of the town.

A number of interesting photographic studies were taken of life at Kiandra, including a series by Charles Kerry, and a scene of Chinese miners near the Township.

== Climate ==
Owing to its elevation, Kiandra has a cold oceanic climate (Köppen climate classification Cfb), as at least 4 months see a mean temperature above 10 °C (50 °F), bordering on a Subpolar oceanic climate (Cfc); having cold and very snowy winters, alongside short and cool summers. Kiandra receives an average of 47.5 snowy days annually. If using the 0 °C (32.0 °F) isotherm, Kiandra qualifies for the continental (Dfb) climate type, a very rare climate for the Southern Hemisphere.

Climate statistics were compiled at the Kiandra Chalet site, elevation 1,395 metres (4,577 ft), from the year 1866 until 1974. Temperature averages were compiled from 1897 to 1974 – though extreme temperature readings were not digitised until 1957. The lowest temperature recorded at Kiandra is −20.6 °C (−5 °F) on 2 August 1929, also the lowest temperature recorded in Australia at that time. The highest temperature is 34.7 °C (94.5 °F), recorded during a severe heatwave in southeast Australia in January 1939. In the digitised records available for the years 1957–1974 displayed in the following table, the lowest temperature recorded is −17.8 °C (0 °F) on 21 July 1965 and 10 August 1966, while the highest temperature is 32.9 °C (91.2 °F) on 31 January 1968.

Climate data for Kiandra Chalet (1897–1974, extremes 1957–1974, rainfall to 1866); 1,395 m AMSL; 35.88° S, 148.50° E
Month	Jan	Feb	Mar	Apr	May	Jun	Jul	Aug	Sep	Oct	Nov	Dec	Year
Record high °C (°F)	34.7 (94.5)	32.8 (91.0)	27.2 (81.0)	22.8 (73.0)	21.1 (70.0)	14.4 (57.9)	10.6 (51.1)	16.7 (62.1)	23.3 (73.9)	23.3 (73.9)	27.8 (82.0)	29.5 (85.1)	34.7 (94.5)
Mean daily maximum °C (°F)	20.7 (69.3)	20.7 (69.3)	17.8 (64.0)	13.1 (55.6)	8.7 (47.7)	5.4 (41.7)	3.9 (39.0)	5.4 (41.7)	8.7 (47.7)	12.6 (54.7)	16.1 (61.0)	19.1 (66.4)	12.7 (54.9)
Daily mean °C (°F)	13.4 (56.1)	13.3 (55.9)	10.9 (51.6)	7.0 (44.6)	3.5 (38.3)	1.1 (34.0)	−0.4 (31.3)	0.8 (33.4)	3.6 (38.5)	6.7 (44.1)	9.6 (49.3)	12.0 (53.6)	6.8 (44.2)
Mean daily minimum °C (°F)	6.1 (43.0)	6.0 (42.8)	4.0 (39.2)	0.9 (33.6)	−1.7 (28.9)	−3.2 (26.2)	−4.7 (23.5)	−3.8 (25.2)	−1.4 (29.5)	0.8 (33.4)	3.2 (37.8)	5.0 (41.0)	0.9 (33.6)
Record low °C (°F)	−3.9 (25.0)	−5.6 (21.9)	−7.2 (19.0)	−10.8 (12.6)	−13.0 (8.6)	−15.6 (3.9)	−17.8 (0.0)	−20.6 (−5.1)	−11.1 (12.0)	−7.8 (18.0)	−7.0 (19.4)	−6.7 (19.9)	−20.6 (−5.1)
Average precipitation mm (inches)	90.3 (3.56)	71.4 (2.81)	94.4 (3.72)	114.0 (4.49)	146.6 (5.77)	185.9 (7.32)	165.0 (6.50)	164.2 (6.46)	152.1 (5.99)	160.6 (6.32)	116.8 (4.60)	99.9 (3.93)	1,561.2 (61.47)
Average precipitation days (≥ 0.2 mm)	7.6	6.8	7.7	9.3	11.7	14.1	13.8	14.3	12.9	12.5	10.1	8.7	129.5
Average afternoon relative humidity (%)	49	51	55	62	69	76	79	73	65	57	54	51	62
Mean monthly sunshine hours	288.3	251.4	241.8	195.0	142.6	114.0	111.6	124.0	156.0	213.9	240.0	282.1	2,360.7
Source 1: Bureau of Meteorology
Source 2: Bureau of Meteorology (sunshine hours from Cabramurra SMHEA, 1962−1999)

== See also ==
- Australian gold rushes
- Gold mining
- Skiing in Australia
- List of extreme temperatures in Australia
