= Clarence River Light =

Lighthouse in New South Wales, Australia

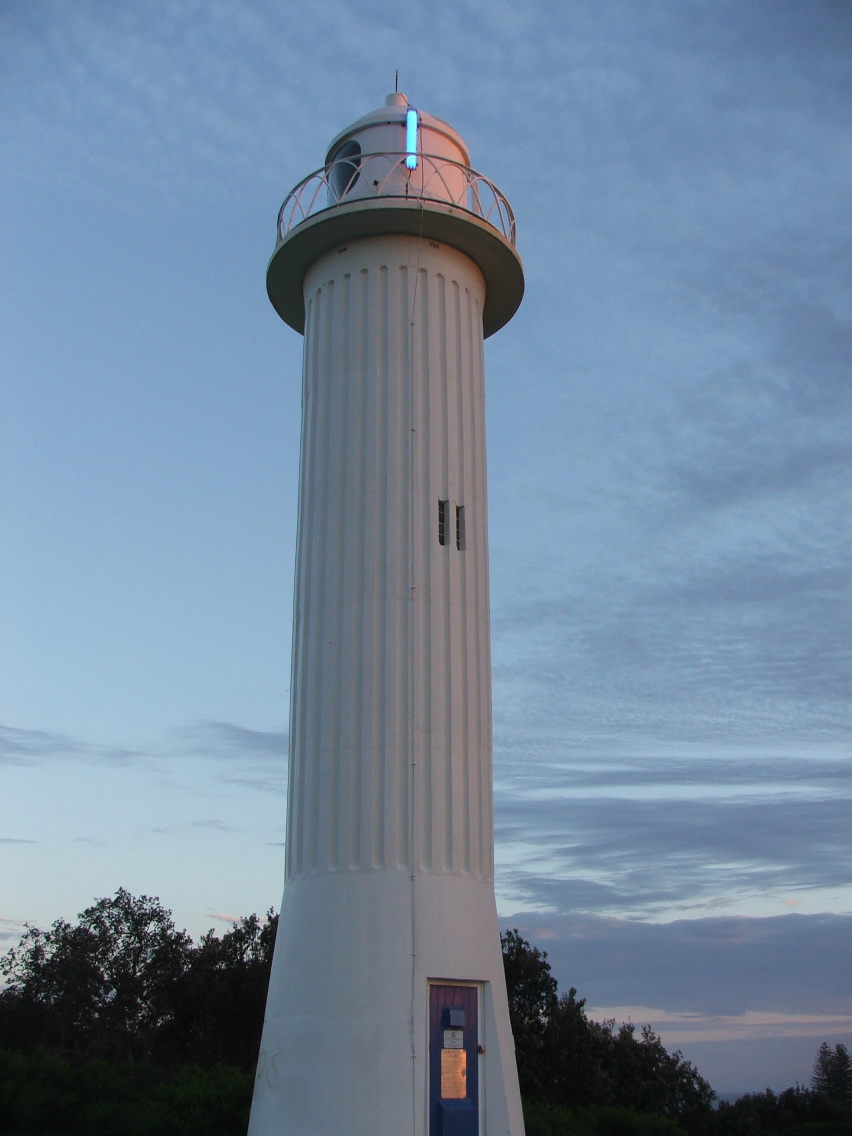
- Clarence River Lighthouse
- Location: Yamba; New South Wales; Australia
- Coordinates: 29°25′56.88″S 153°21′50.37″E

Tower
- Constructed: 1866 (first)
- Construction: concrete tower
- Automated: 1920
- Height: 56 feet (17 m)
- Shape: fluted cylindrical tower with balcony and lantern
- Markings: white tower and lantern
- Power source: mains electricity
- Operator: Australian Maritime Safety Authority

Light
- First lit: 1955 (current)
- Deactivated: 1955 (first)
- Focal height: 135 feet (41 m)
- Intensity: 22,000 candela
- Range: 16 nmi (30 km; 18 mi)
- Characteristic: Fl (3) W 15s. F Bu

Clarence River Light, also known as Yamba Light or Clarence Head Light, is an active lighthouse located on Pilot Hill, a hill in Wooli Park, Yamba, New South Wales, Australia, south of the entrance of Clarence River. The current lighthouse was built in 1955, replacing a previous lighthouse built in 1880. It serves as the rear range light for two different ranges.

== History ==
=== Old lighthouse ===
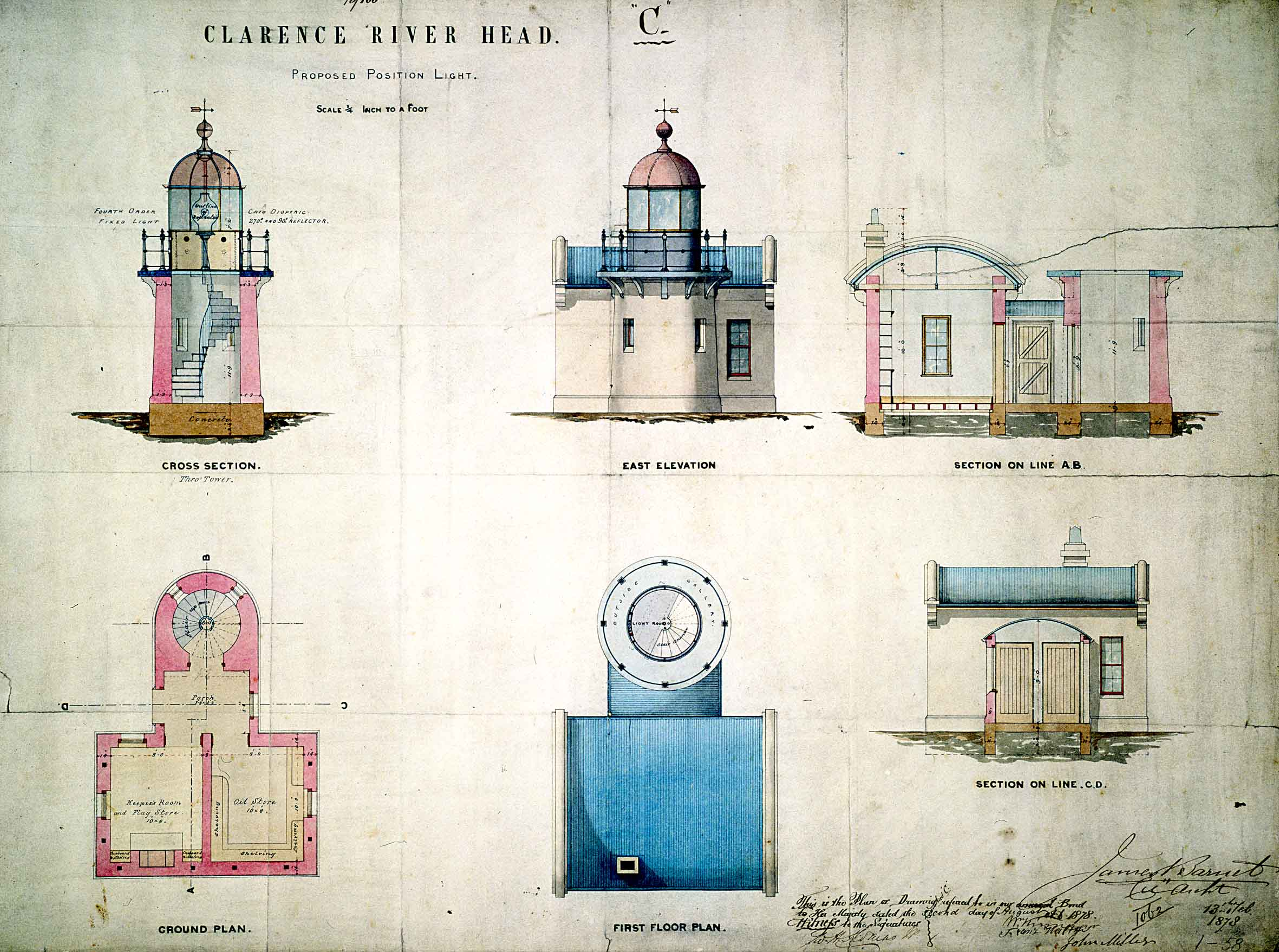
Plans for the lighthouse, as drawn in 1878 by James Barnet

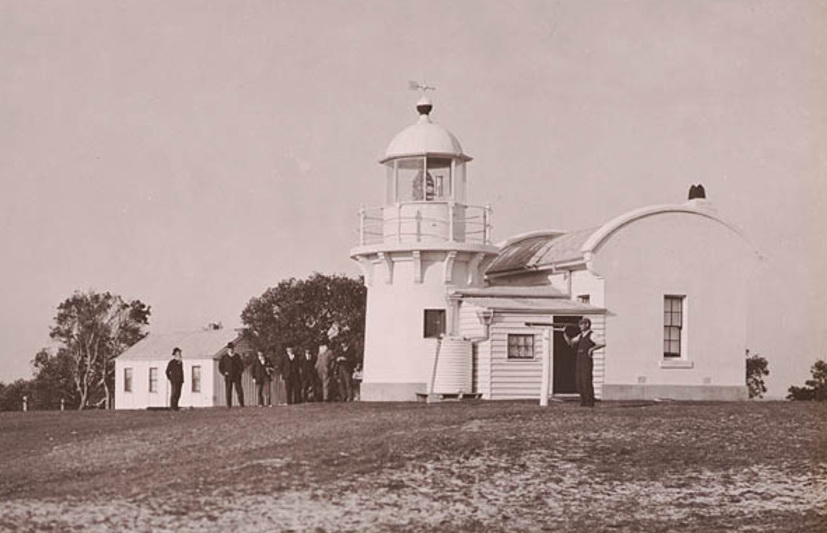
The original 1880 Clarence River Lighthouse with keeper's cottage to the left.

The first light on Pilot Hill was most probably a platform with a kerosene lamp, located on the eastern part of the hill. The first actual structure was a small wooden hut built in 1866 with a large kerosene lamp placed on a bench. It was located where the 1880 lighthouse was later built, at 29°26′1.16″S 153°21′44.26″E. The mast from this lighthouse is on display at the Story House Museum in Yamba.

In 1878 tenders were called for a permanent lighthouse, one of five lighthouses of similar design designed by James Barnet in 1878–80, the other four being Fingal Head Light, Crowdy Head Light, Tacking Point Lighthouse and Richmond River Light. It was built by W. Kinnear at a cost of £1,097, and construction was completed in 1880.

Like the other four lighthouses, it was a rather short tower, about 7 metres (23 ft) high, with a roofed porch connecting it to a rectangular annexe. It was visible for 6 nautical miles (11 km; 6.9 mi). A keeper's cottage was also constructed near-by.

In 1920 the lighthouse was automated and demanned.

In 1934 the Pacific Hotel was built in Yamba, and the light was somewhat obscured. In addition, a water reservoir was to be built at the location. A new lighthouse was built in 1955, and the old lighthouse was demolished in 1956.

=== Restoration ===
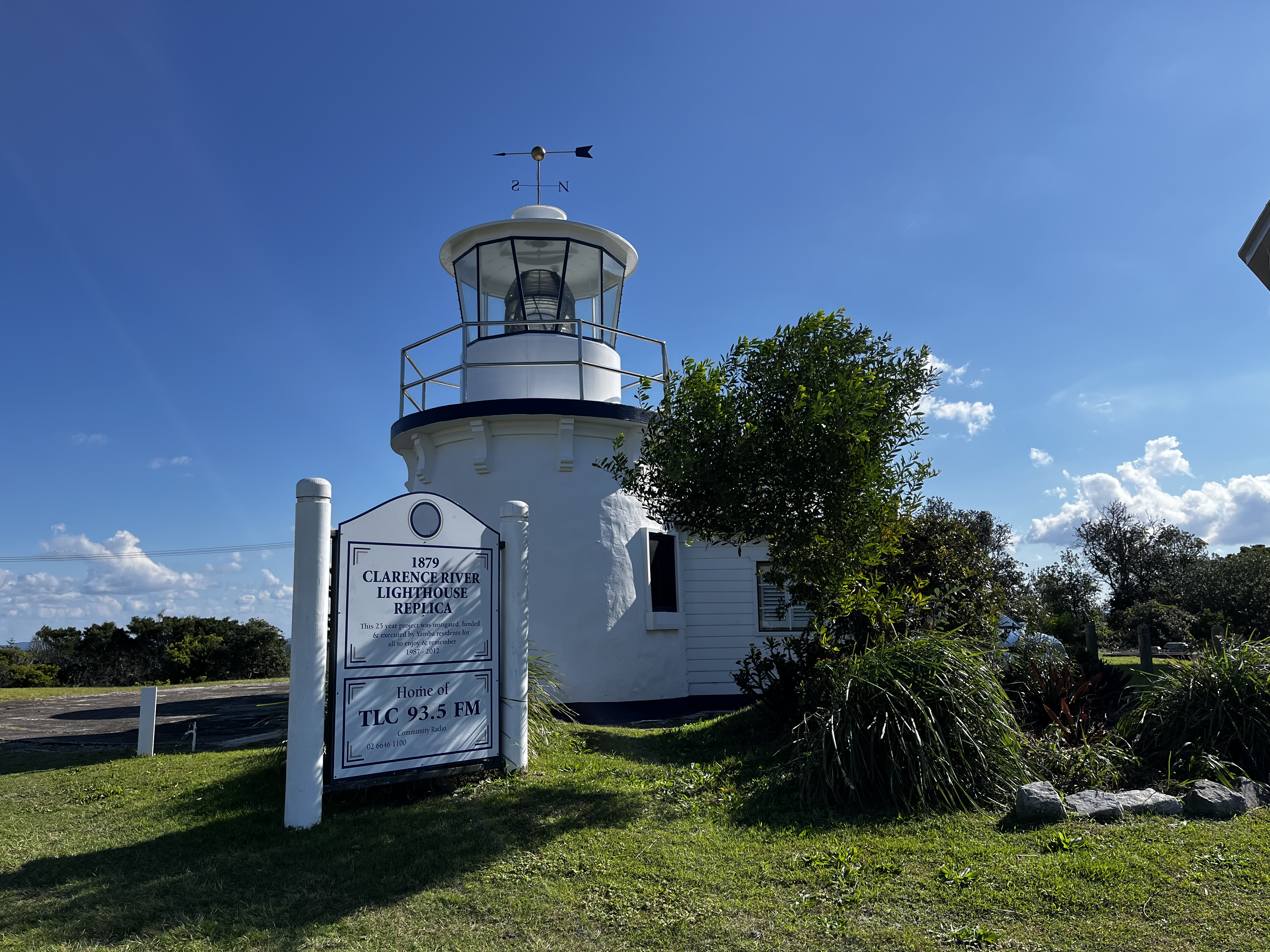
Replica of the 1879 Clarence River Lighthouse, completed in 2012

After the reservoir was demolished in 1980, an attempt has been made to raise government funds to erect a replica of the lighthouse at the original location. However, as funds could not be raised, local volunteers self-funded and built the replica, but without the lantern. The building houses the Yamba Community Radio Station 2TLC. In 2009, a project began to fully restore the lighthouse again, with support from local individuals and businesses. In November 2011 the project was almost completed, with the installation of a lantern and an original 19th century Fresnel lens donated by the Australian Maritime Safety Authority (AMSA) for the project.

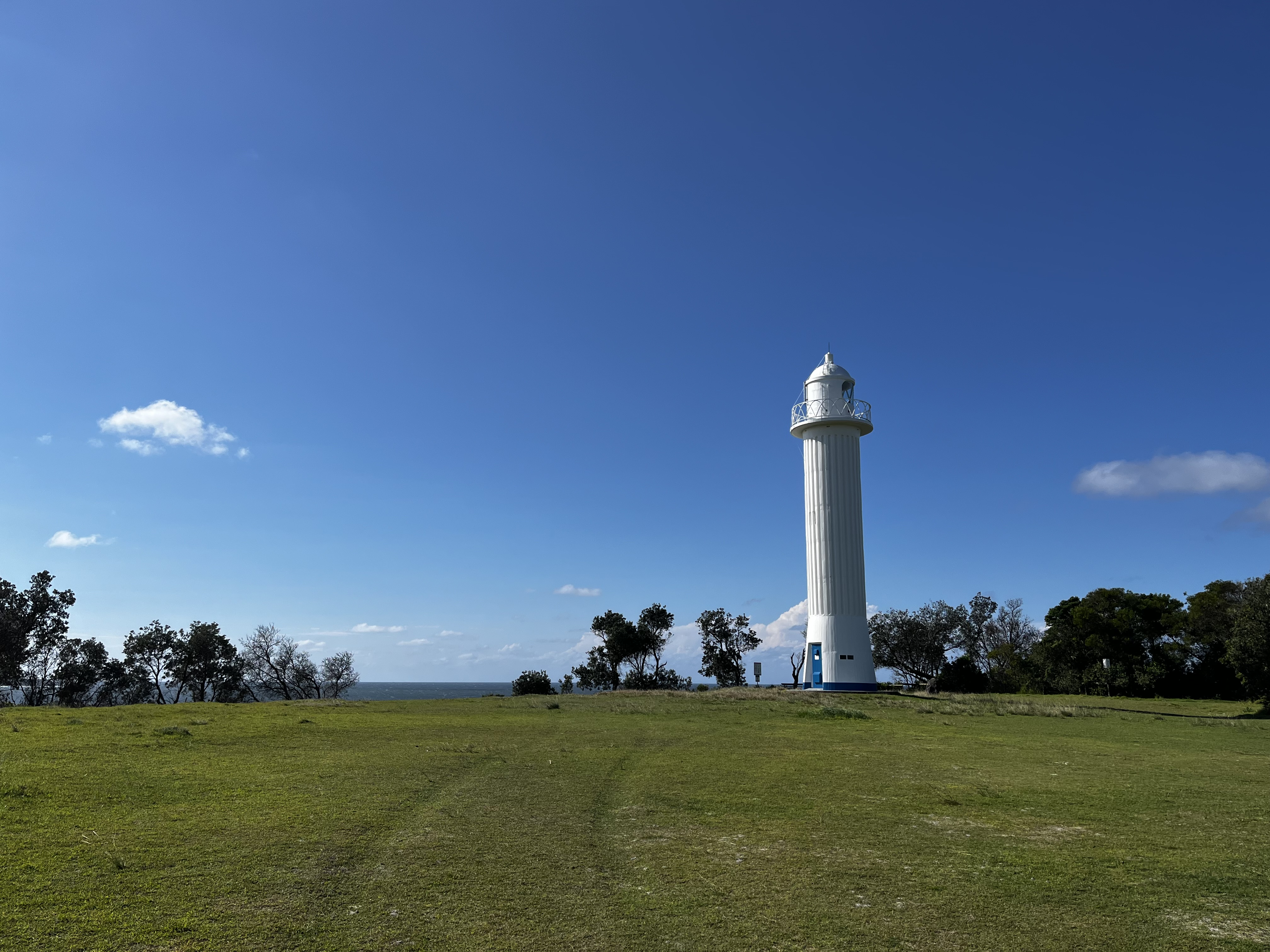
Distant view of the Clarence River Lighthouse (Yamba Lighthouse)

=== Current lighthouse ===
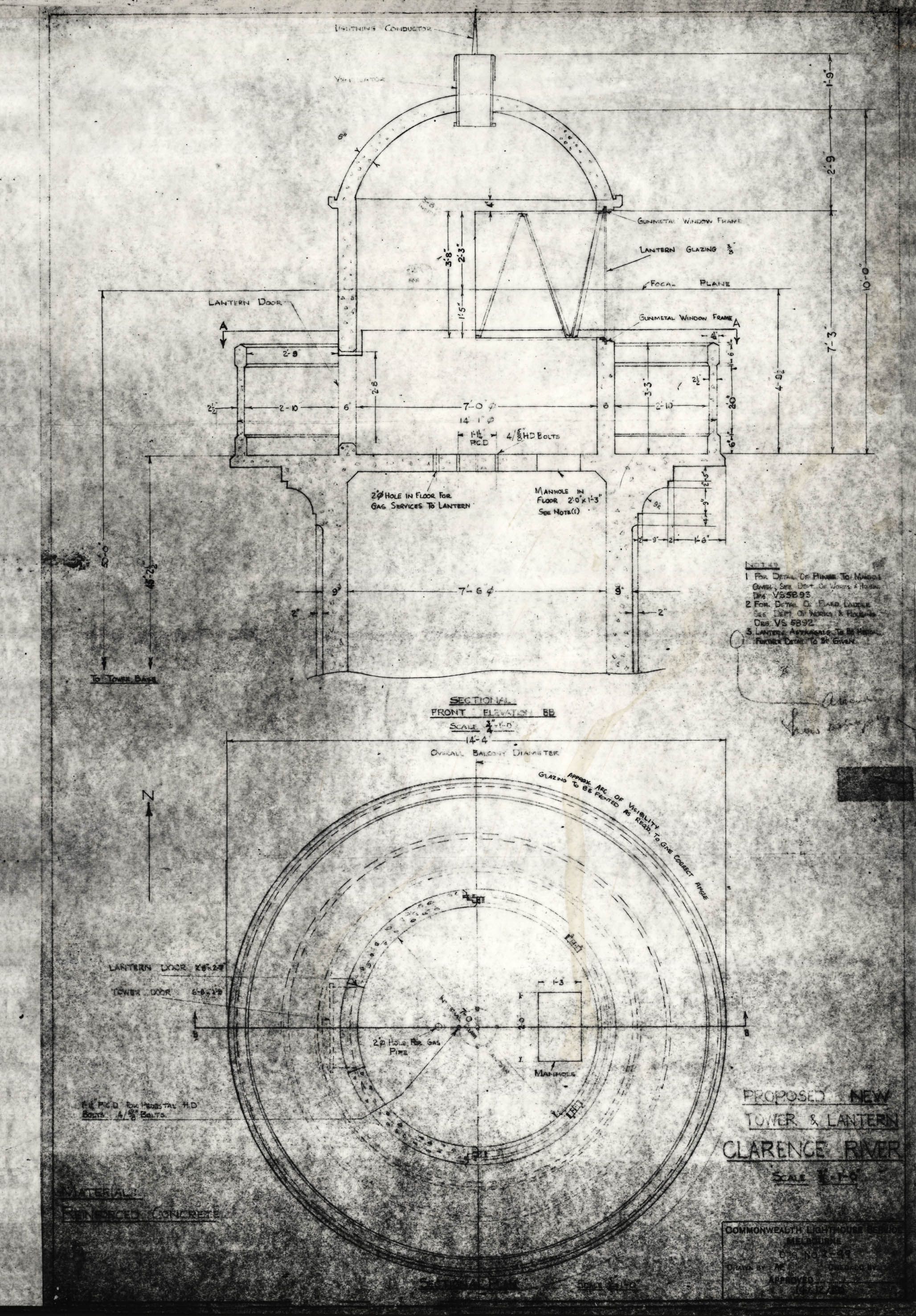
Plans for the new tower, 1951

The new lighthouse was built in 1955 from concrete in a modern style. The apparatus from the old lighthouse was transferred.

The current light source is a FA-251 beacon with a 12 Volt 75 Watt quartz halogen lamp, supplying a light intensity of 22,000 cd and visible for 16 nautical miles (30 km). The power source is a battery charged from the mains electricity. The current characteristic is three white flashes every 15 seconds (Fl.(3)W. 15s). It also shows a fixed blue light (F.Bu.) which serves as a rear light for the North Channel Range Front Light at -131° (NGA 5945, Admiralty K2822, showing Iso.Bu. 2s).

== Site operation and visiting ==
The light is operated by the Australian Maritime Safety Authority, while the site is managed by the New South Wales Department of Lands. The grounds are open and accessible to the public, and parking is available close by. The tower itself is closed.

== See also ==
- List of lighthouses in Australia
