= Tacking Point Lighthouse =

Lighthouse in New South Wales, Australia

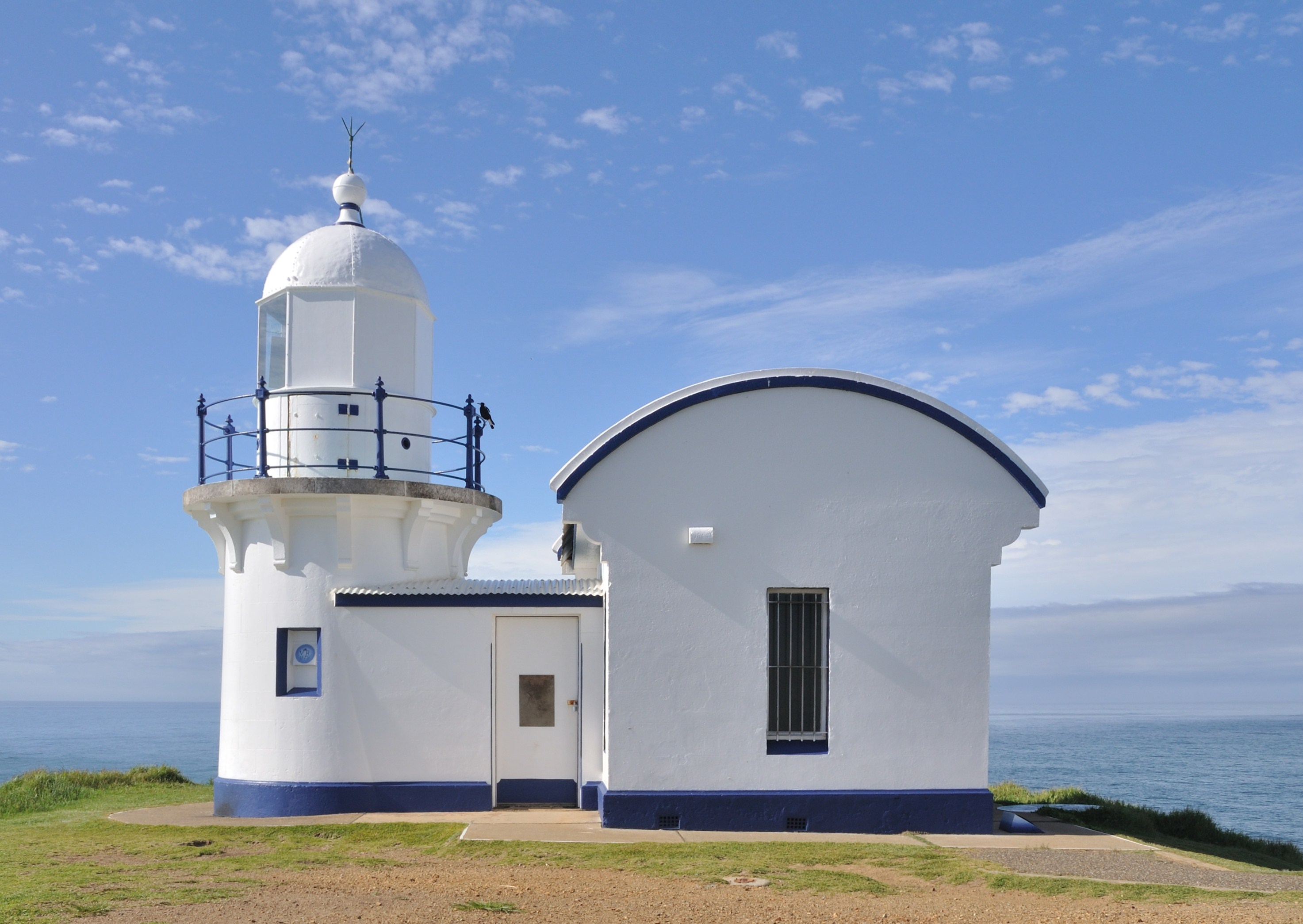
- Tacking Point Lighthouse, 2012
- Location: Port Macquarie; New South Wales; Australia
- Coordinates: 31.4755°S 152.9372°E

Tower
- Constructed: 1879
- Construction: cement render bricks
- Automated: 1919
- Height: 8 m (26 ft)
- Shape: cylindrical tower with balcony and lantern
- Markings: white tower, lantern and attached storeroom, blue balcony rail
- Power source: mains electricity
- Operator: Australian Maritime Safety Authority

Light
- Focal height: 34 m (111 ft)
- Intensity: 12,800 cd
- Range: 16 nmi (30 km; 18 mi)
- Characteristic: Fl (4) W 20s.

Tacking Point Lighthouse is Australia's thirteenth oldest lighthouse. It was built on a rocky headland about 8 kilometres south of Port Macquarie in 1879 by Shepherd and Joseph William Mortley, to a design by the New South Wales Colonial Architect, James Barnet. It is operated by the Australian Maritime Safety Authority and is classified by the National Trust of Australia (NSW).

Tacking Point was named by explorer Matthew Flinders in 1802 during his 1802–1803 circumnavigation of Australia. Its nearest lighthouses are Smoky Cape Lighthouse at South West Rocks, to the north, and Crowdy Head Light, to the south.

== History ==
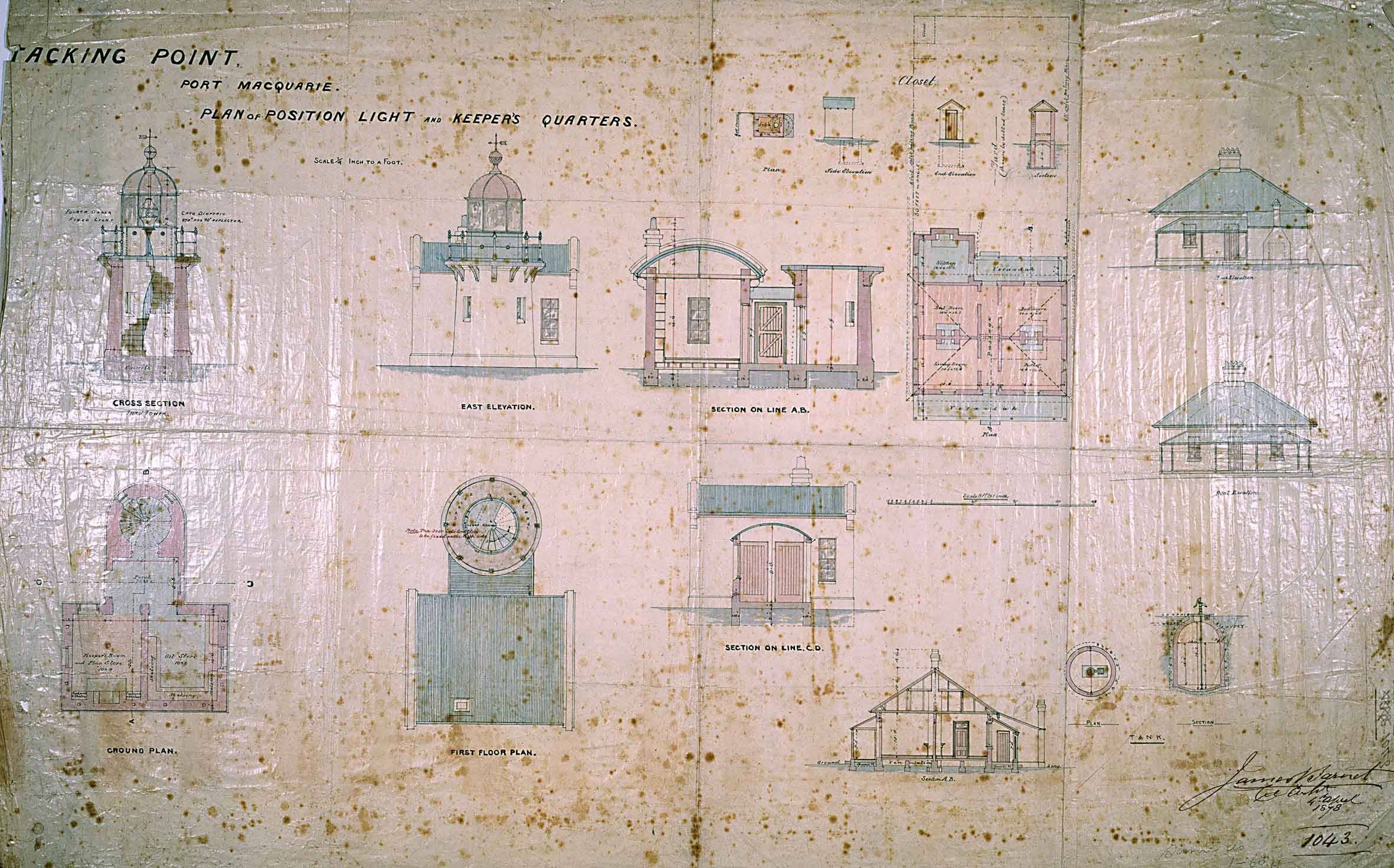
Original plans by James Barnet, 1878

In the mid-nineteenth century, there were few lights in the Tacking Point area and over 20 ships were wrecked. The first occurred in December 1823 when the schooner Black Jack was wrecked on the Port Macquarie bar. Consequently, in 1879, a fixed catadioptric light of less than 1000 candelas was erected on Tacking Point. It was the fourth of five small navigational lighthouses built to a design by James Barnet. The other four lighthouses were Crowdy Head Light, Fingal Head Light, Richmond River Light and Clarence River Light (now demolished). Only two of these lighthouses, Tacking Point and Crowdy Head still have a storeroom attached.

The lighthouse was built of cement-rendered bricks and only needed to be 8 metres high due to the elevation of the site. In 1919, the light was converted from wick oil light to automatic acetylene operation, and was converted to automated operations in 1920. The light was later converted to mains electricity in 1974. The foundations of the keeper's cottage are still visible.

Management of the lighthouse is shared by three government authorities: the New South Wales Department of Lands owns the lighthouse; Transport for NSW operates the light; and the Port Macquarie-Hastings Council manages the site. Vandalism has been a problem in the early 2000s. Resolving the issue has been complicated by the split management.

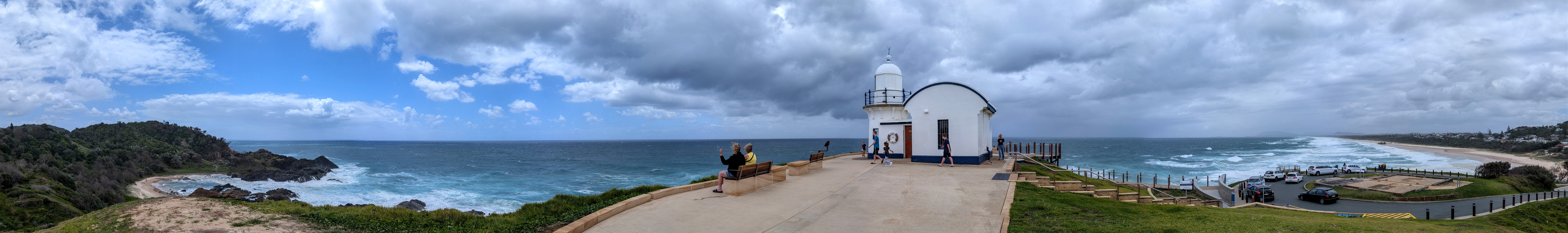
Panoramic view of Tacking Point Lighthouse, with Little Bay on the left, and Lighthouse Beach on the right

== Tourism ==
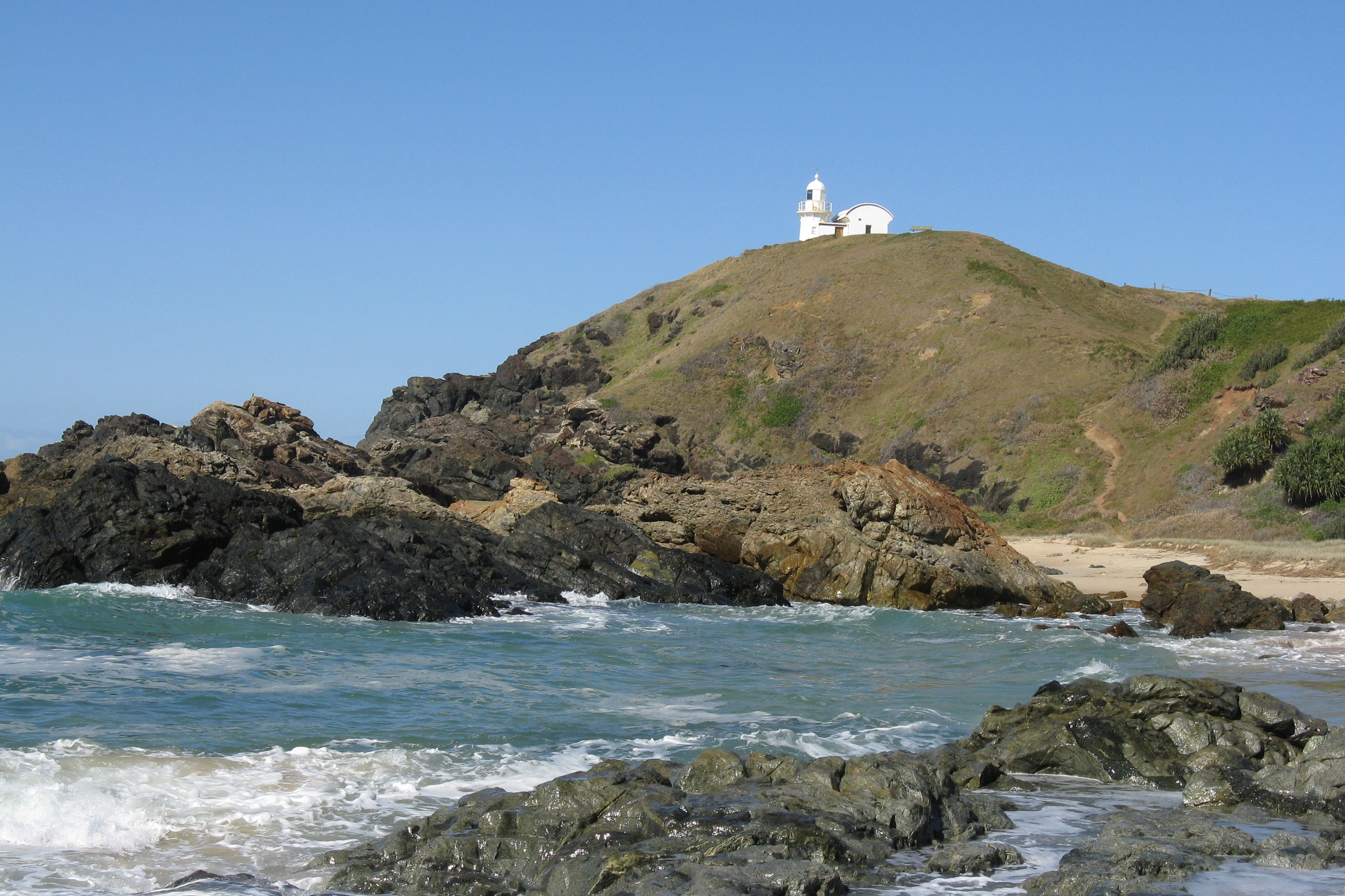
Tacking Point Lighthouse viewed from Little Bay, 2008

The lighthouse headland marks the end of the circa 9 km coastal walk from Town Beach to Lighthouse Beach being built by the Port Macquarie–Hastings Council. The lighthouse is a popular site for whale watching. The area is used for surfing and there is a surf life-saving club at the neighbouring Lighthouse Beach.

== See also ==
- List of lighthouses in Australia
