= Montara oil spill =

Oil spill in Timor Sea in 2009

Coordinates: 12.763589°S 124.502563°E

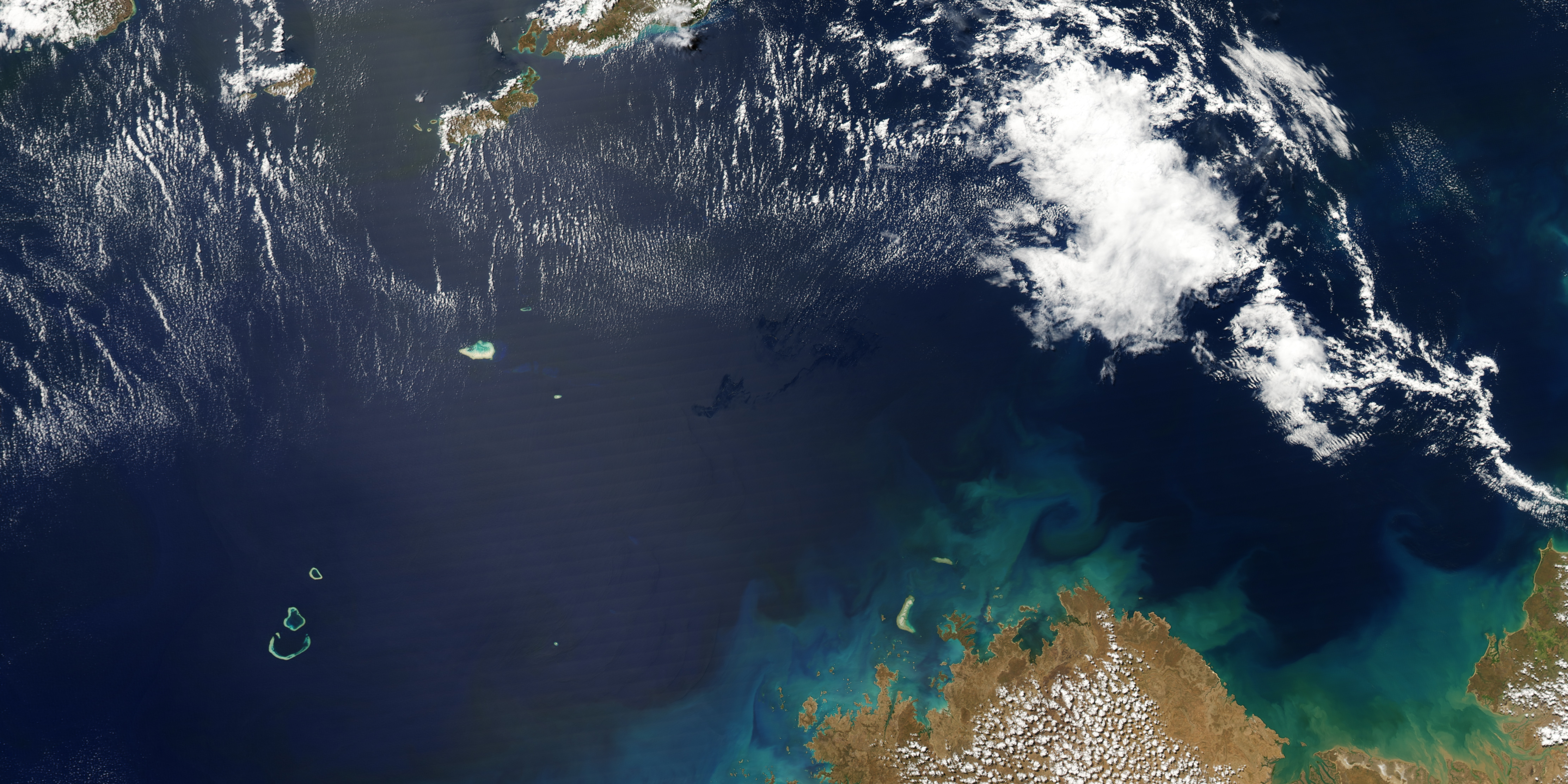
- Satellite image of the oil slick in the Timor Sea, September 2009.
- Interactive map of Montara oil spill
- Location: Timor Sea, off the northern coast of Western Australia
- Date: 21 August 2009 to 3 November 2009 (75 days)

Cause
- Cause: Leak from the Montara wellhead platform
- Operator: PTT Public Company Limited

Spill characteristics
- Volume: 1.2 to 9 million US gallons (4,500 to 34,100 m^{3}) total
- Area: 6,000 km2 (2,300 sq mi)

The Montara oil spill was an oil and gas leak and subsequent slick that took place in the Montara oil field in the Timor Sea, off the northern coast of Western Australia. It is considered one of Australia's worst oil disasters. The slick was released following a blowout from the Montara wellhead platform on 21 August 2009, and continued leaking until 3 November 2009 (in total 75 days), when the leak was stopped by pumping mud into the well and the wellbore cemented thus "capping" the blowout. The West Atlas rig is owned by the Norwegian-Bermudan Seadrill, and operated by PTTEP Australasia (PTTEPAA), a subsidiary of PTT Exploration and Production (PTTEP) which is in turn a subsidiary of PTT, the Thai state-owned oil and gas company was operating over on adjacent well on the Montara platform. Houston-based Halliburton was involved in cementing the well. The Montara field is located off the Kimberley coast, 250 km (160 mi) north of Truscott airbase, and 690 km (430 mi) west of Darwin. Sixty-nine workers were safely evacuated from the West Atlas jackup drilling rig when the blowout occurred.

The Australian Department of Resources, Energy and Tourism estimated that the Montara oil leak could be as high as 2,000 barrels (320 m^{3})/day, five times the 400 barrels (64 m^{3})/day estimated by PTTEP Australasia. A spokesman for Resources Minister, Martin Ferguson, said the 2,000 barrels (320 m^{3}) referred to the amount of oil that the well could produce when brought into peak production. After flying over the spill site, Australian Greens Senator Rachel Siewert claimed the spill was far greater than had originally been reported. WWF-Australia also claimed that the spill was worse than originally expected.

The first four attempts to plug the oil leak by PTTEPAA failed, but the fifth attempt succeeded on 3 November 2009, when PTTEPAA pumped approximately 3,400 barrels (540 m^{3}) of mud into a relief well to stop the leak.

On 1 November 2009, during an attempt to stop the leak, a fire broke out on the West Atlas drilling rig. On 2 November, PTTEPAA said that the fire appeared to be burning off the oil and thereby preventing further leakage into the sea. The fire was largely extinguished when the leak was stopped. Once safety criteria were met, a specialist team boarded the Montara wellhead platform and the West Atlas to assess the damages.

The operation later in November 2009 to finally plug the well after the leak was stopped involved pumping a 1,400 metre cement plug from the West Triton rig down the relief well to the bottom of the 2.5 kilometre well. Once completed, the West Triton relief rig was demobilized and returned to Singapore.

In December 2009, a team from PTTEPAA and Alert Well Control returned to the Montara field to complete the final stages of the operation, which involved inserting two mechanical barriers at depth above the cement plug into the well. Operations were completed in January 2010 when the reboarding team installed a capping assembly on the well.

Work to safely remove the West Atlas drilling rig from the Montara well head platform (WHP) in the Timor Sea started in August 2010.

The offshore construction vessel Jascon 25 equipped with an 800-tonne crane was mobilized for the salvage operations. This work was expected to take about three months and involve cleaning and removal of debris from the rig as well as the cantilever drill floor which was left extended over the WHP helideck after the fire in November 2009. After the debris removal work was completed, this was followed by the jacking down of the West Atlas rig to be towed to Singapore.

PTTEPAA announced a major transformation of its Australian drilling operations on 24 November 2010 following the release of the Australian Government's Montara Commission of Inquiry report into causes of the incident. The company said it was implementing a nine-point Action Plan to embed the highest standards of oil field practice and safety in its operations. PTTEPAA said it regretted the Montara incident and acknowledged there were deficiencies identified in the company's operations in the Commission of Inquiry's report. The company said drilling supervisors and management associated with the incident have been removed from their positions with the company. According to a company spokesman, the Action Plan will "ensure the full accountability of key personnel to give greater oversight for reporting and checking of all critical offshore operations. This will strengthen the integrity and safety of drilling operations".

== Initial leak and spread ==
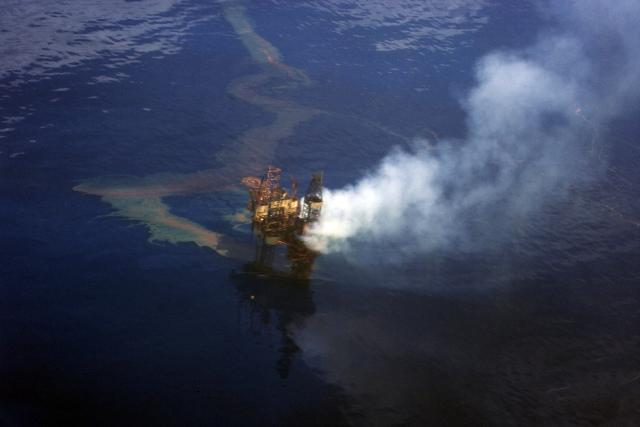
The damaged Montara Wellhead Platform before catching fire

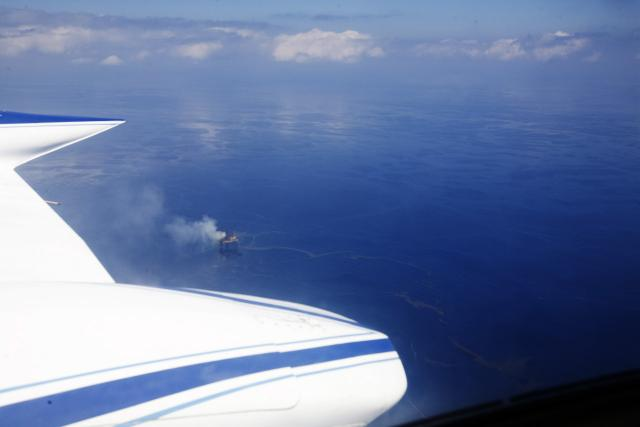
The West Atlas drilling rig and oil spill

The leak initially emanated from the Montara Wellhead platform on 21 August 2009. The depth of water was approximately 250 ft (76 m) and depth of hole was approximately 1.6 mi (3 km) below the seabed. Sixty-nine workers on the rig were safely evacuated with no injuries or fatalities. By 24 August, the oil slick resulting from the spill was estimated to be 14 km (9 mi) long and 30 m (100 ft) wide. On 29 August, the slick was estimated at 180 km (110 mi) at a minimum, measured east to west.

By 3 September 2009, the Australian Maritime Safety Authority (AMSA) reported that the slick was 170 km (106 mi) from the coast of Western Australia, and moving closer to the shore. The slick was also reported to have spread over 6,000 km^{2} (2,300 sq mi) of ocean with evidence that the oil was killing marine life. Reports that the slick had spread to within 120 km (75 mi) of the Northern Territory coastline were dismissed as incorrect, with the AMSA stating that the discoloured water was likely to be a natural phenomenon, such as an algal bloom or coral spawn. Daily overflights by the Australian authorities in September and October 2009 identified isolated patches of weathered oil and sheen within Indonesian waters with small patches seen 94 kilometres south east of Roti Island. At the time the main spill was located about 248 kilometres from the Indonesian coastline.

The West Australian newspaper online reported that no oil had reached the Kimberley coastline in northern Western Australia. The report was based on a West Australian Environmental Protection Authority study conducted in October 2009 during the spill. The study, released in July 2010 stated no traces of hydrocarbons were found in water or shoreline sediments in areas sampled between Camden Sound and the Stewart Islands.

== Clean-up and response ==
The Australian Marine Oil Spill Centre began mobilising aircraft and equipment on 21 August 2009. On 23 August 2009, a Hercules aircraft sprayed 10,000 liters of chemical dispersant onto parts of the slick, with ongoing aerial spraying with dispersants being the primary early response to the spill. Spraying from vessels commenced on 30 August and continued until 1 November utilising 118,000 liters of dispersant. Six different chemical dispersants were used: Slickgone NS, Slickgone LTSW, Ardrox 6120, Tergo R40, Corexit 9500 and Corexit 9527. In total, 184,135 liters of chemical dispersants were sprayed from aircraft or vessels between 23 August and 1 November.

The West Triton jackup drilling rig arrived at the Montara Field in an attempt to plug the oil leak on 11 September 2009. Oil and gas producer, Woodside Petroleum Ltd offered to assist PTTEPAA in cleaning up the oil spill with the use of a rig closer to the spill site. However, PTTEPAA rejected the Woodside offer on the basis of "safety reasons". The Woodside rig was a semisubmersible drilling rig and, as it floats on the sea surface, was not deemed as a suitable platform for the relief well. A jackup rig was required because it could be secured to the sea floor giving better stability and had the capacity to pump large volumes of heavy mud needed to stop the leak. On 6 September, the plugging of the oil leak was delayed further by a broken towline to the mobile oil rig being towed in from Indonesia by PTTEPAA. On 7 September, the Australian Federal Government announced that it was suspending the normal approval process to fast track stopping the leak at the West Atlas oil rig. PTTEP Australasia initially said it could be just days before the leak was brought under control, but then said that the oil leak would continue for eight weeks until they could bring in another mobile offshore rig, West Triton, to drill a hole into the leaking oil well, and pump mud in to alleviate pressure to stop the oil flow.

On 1 November 2009, the West Triton rig successfully drilled the relief well to intercept the leaking well. During operations to kill the leak by pumping heavy mud down the relief well, a fire broke out from the H1 well on the well head platform. This was expected to delay further work on resolving the spill. All eight non-essential personnel were taken off the West Triton rig.

On 1 November 2009, the fifth attempt to intercept the well succeeded. Approximately 3,400 barrels (540 m^{3}) of heavy mud were subsequently pumped down the relief well on 3 November 2009 thereby stopping the leak and extinguishing the fire. PTTEPAA continued to pump a mixture of heavy mud and brine into the relief to maintain a stable condition before it was eventually cemented. Once the leak was killed, the main fire on the Montara Wellhead platform was extinguished. Some material on the topside of the West Atlas rig remained on fire but had extinguished by 3 November 2009 as the fuel source burnt out.

In July 2010, a PTTEPAA team rebounded the well head platform to pressure test all the wells. Following a three-week operation, the company confirmed all wells were secure.

PTTEPAA estimates that it has spent $170 million on the gas and oil leak up to 3 November 2009. The environmental clean-up cost $5.3 million. Since the spill originated directly from an oil well, it is difficult to determine its total size with any precision. Estimates range from 1.2 million US gallons (4,500 m^{3}) to more than 9 million US gallons (34,000 m^{3}), or about 4,000 tonnes to 30,000 tonnes.

== Environmental effects ==
The Australian Government in November 2010 released the first results of an independent scientific studies conducted under the long-term environmental monitoring program being funded by PTTEPAA under an agreement with the Australian Government announced in October 2009. The scientific studies issued by the Australian Department of Sustainability, Environment, Water, Population and Communities (DSEWPaC) on 19 November 2010 found that no oil reached the Australian mainland or Indonesian coast and the maximum surface area of the ocean that had hydrocarbons on it on any one given day during the spill was 11,183 square kilometres. The Australian Government sought independent expert advice on the detail of the environmental monitoring program from organizations such as the Australian Institute of Marine Science, the Commonwealth Scientific and Industrial Research Organization (CSIRO) and State and Territory agencies. Each scientific study conducted under the program is subject to a detailed review by a DSEWPaC technical advisory board. PTTEPAA will fund the comprehensive monitoring program for at least two years, with some studies expected to continue up to five years or longer if required to provide data to measure and address any longer-term impacts should they occur. A PTTEPAA spokesperson said "the commitment to run some of the studies beyond two years does not necessarily indicate long-term impacts but supports the recommendations of independent experts to ensure the best science is in place to monitor the marine environment". The spokesperson said the studies are creating a body of high quality scientific baseline data in key areas of the Timor Sea marine environment which will be an asset for the industry and the community in managing activities in the region.

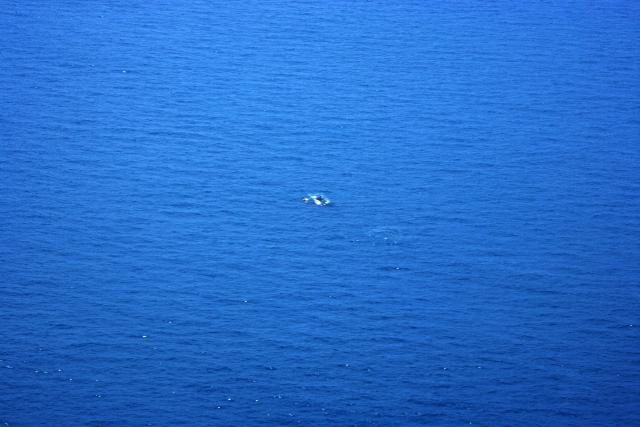
A whale and calf swimming near the site of the Montara oil spill

Biologists said that the effects of the Montara oil spill could be catastrophic for marine ecosystems, with claims that although it is a lightweight crude oil spilling from the platform, it can still have toxic effects on birds, marine invertebrates, coral and marine algae. The Wilderness Society described the area as a "marine superhighway", and whales and endangered flatback turtles observed in the area are at risk from the spill. By 3 September 2009, fishers observed sick and dying marine life, and an absence of birds in the spill area. The World Wildlife Fund (WWF) observed spinner dolphins, sooty terns, spotted sea snake and threatened hawksbill and flatback turtles swimming in the oil slick, and expressed concern about long-term effects. WWF also observed a wax-like residue from the oil spill. The Australian government has acknowledged treating a small number of birds as a result of the spill, including common noddies, brown boobies and a sooty tern.

=== West Timor, Indonesia ===
Indonesian fishermen have claimed that the spill and response polluted their national waters, killed thousands of fish and caused skin diseases and loss of human life. NGOs in Indonesia expressed concern about the oil spill's effects on the Indonesian environment and traditional fishing grounds as the oil spill drifted towards the islands of Timor and Sumba. The Montara oil field is situated south of Indonesia's Pasir Island, a popular fishing location for many East Nusa Tenggara fishermen.

The extent of the spread of the oil slick and sheen into Indonesian waters is disputed. Maps obtained by the Australian Lawyers Alliance under the Freedom of Information Act suggested that oil could have come as close as 37 km to the southern coast of Rote. The Australian Maritime Safety Authority advised that while figures on the maps were accurate, the maps were not drawn to scale so distances could not be visually interpreted. PTTEP maintains that the slick remained 94 km distant from Indonesia and was primarily contained within a 23 km radius of the drilling platform.

In October 2010, fishermen claimed to have observed dramatic declines in the number of red snapper caught by Indonesians, with 7,000 fishers impacted by loss of income, including cases of bankruptcy. Declining fish catches have forced thousands of fishermen to find new livelihoods on other islands as distant as the Bangka–Belitung Islands. On 10 November, video emerged of Indonesian fisherman and scuba divers holding dead fish whilst in the water amongst the oil slick. The footage was allegedly taken whilst in Indonesian waters.

The West Timor Care Foundation received reports on the death of eight people and 30 poisonous cases after the consumption of fish in the waters around areas allegedly contaminated by oil and chemical dispersant. As of October 2010, the foundation was the only Indonesian NGO to file a legal action with the Australian independent investigation commission into the Montara spill.

The Australian Lawyers Alliance has argued that in absence of sub-surface sampling of oil and chemical dispersant, the spread of contamination and the environmental consequences of the spill can not be fully understood. The organization has called for further investigation, suggesting that if Australian livelihoods had been affected there would be public outrage.

East Nusa Tenggara governor Frans Leburaya said Australia and the operator of the oil field should be held responsible for any environmental damage caused by the oil spill. In June 2010, the East Nusa Tenggara provincial government estimated that economic losses due to the pollution of the Timor Sea resulting from the Montara spill amounted to more than 2.5-3 trillion rupiah (Rp) or $318–382 million (AUD). The loss was born exclusively by the fishermen and coastal residents whose living was dependent on marine resources.

The Indonesian president, Susilo Bambang Yudhoyono announced that the Indonesian government would seek compensation from PTTEPAA because he believed the lives of Indonesian seaweed farmers and fishermen had been affected by the oil spill.

PTTEP Australia has stated that independent studies published by the Australian Department for the Environment found that 98.6 per cent of Montara oil stayed in Australian waters, and that the company has received "no credible evidence of damage to the environment in West Timor."

=== East Timor ===
East Timorese President, Dr José Ramos-Horta, said that the Australian government and the Thai company that own the platform are responsible for the spill, and that he will seek compensation for damage caused by the spill to his country's environment. Ramos-Horta called for Australian environmental organisations to help assess whether the spill has caused damage to East Timor's maritime area.

== Wildlife impact monitoring ==
To assist in planning and executing the spill response, the Australian Government commenced an environmental monitoring program comprising a series of operational studies, including a wildlife monitoring program. The wildlife monitoring program sought to locate, assess and treat oil affected wildlife found in the region of the spill. Carcasses of oil affected wildlife were retained and tested to determine their cause of death. Studies undertaken under this program by Associate Professor Marthe Monique Gagnon and Dr. Christopher Rawson from Curtin University in Western Australia, involved testing of four fish specimens collected in the vicinity of the spill. Tests were also conducted on 16 birds, two sea snakes and one green turtle collected in the region of the oil spill. Results announced in November 2010 found that two of the birds (both common noddies) had been affected by oil, one internally and the second both internally and externally. The study also found that the 14 remaining birds had no traces of oil. The poor physical condition of the remaining birds suggests that they likely died of natural causes. Tests on the horned sea snake indicated it had been affected by oil; however, positive hydrocarbon readings were only detected in its stomach contents. This suggests the sea snake was indirectly exposed to oil through ingesting prey. Tests on the sea turtle found no positive results for hydrocarbons, which indicated oil exposure was not the cause of death.

Shoreline ecological assessment – Study S2 This independent study, led by Dr Norm Duke of the University of Queensland, aimed to collect baseline information on habitats and species found along Australia's north-west coast between Broome in Western Australia and Darwin in the Northern Territory. During November 2009, aerial surveys were undertaken covering more than 5,000 km of shoreline. The study findings are consistent with those released in July 2010 by the Environmental Protection Authority of Western Australia (EPA) from an independent survey of the Kimberley shoreline conducted in October–November 2009 which found no oil issued during the Montara incident reached the Western Australian coast. The EPA surveyed 16 Kimberley island shorelines and two mainland promontories between Camden Sound and the Stewart Islands. The EPA found that no hydrocarbons were detected in any water or shoreline samples and analyses of rock oyster and cultured pearl oyster show no evidence of in situ contamination.

Oil Fate and Effects Assessment – Trajectory Analysis Study S7.1 This study was undertaken by Asia-Pacific ASA, an Australian company that specialises in modelling, mapping and assessing spill events throughout the world. Headed by senior oceanographer Dr Brian King and senior chemist and environmental scientist Trevor Gilbert, the S7.1 study combined sightings of oil with modelling data to produce a picture of the likely extent of the spill. The results of this study will be used so that future scientific monitoring covers appropriate areas. This study used trajectory modelling, overflight data and satellite images to gain an almost hourly understanding of the spill. This study reported, in part, that no oil reached the Australian mainland or Indonesian coast. The greatest occurrence of oil was within 22.8 kilometers of the release site. Beyond 22.8 kilometers, the hydrocarbons were predominantly sheens/waxy films and of short duration. 98.6 per cent of occurrences of hydrocarbons on surface were within Australian waters. King's oil fate and effects studies also used reports from the World Wildlife Fund (WWF), all submissions made to the Montara Commission of Inquiry and related transcripts, as well as Australian and Indonesian media reports of oil locations. Combination of all these datasets with scientific modelling ensured the most accurate and objective description of the movement of hydrocarbons in the Timor Sea throughout the incident, Dr King said. Satellite imagery used in Asia-Pacific ASA's assessments were the same used by the WWF and oil spill tracker Skytruth, with additional high resolution imagery from LANDSAT. These combined techniques gave Dr King the highest degree of confidence in providing detailed modelling, analysis and mapping of the spill event.

Oil Fate and Effects Assessment – Dispersant Oil Modelling Study S7.2 After using chemical dispersants to accelerate the natural breakdown of oil during the Montara incident, the Australian Government sought to find out the fate of the dispersed oil once it was in the water column. This study aimed to determine the potential concentrations of dispersed oil under the water surface using computer modelling.

The S7.2 study undertaken by specialist company ASA-Pacific reported, in part the chemical dispersant application caused increased hydrocarbon concentrations in the water column, mostly within the first meter of the water column. However, these concentrations reduced quickly with time, depth and distance from the dispersant application site and no dispersed oil reached the Australian mainland or Indonesian coast.

The study found that under the worst-case scenario dispersed oil from three of the spraying operations may have reached the Goerree and Barracouta shoals. Because of these findings, a further study—the Scientific Monitoring Study 5 Offshore Banks Assessment Survey—will be undertaken. Dispersant Study S7.2 research relied on the Australian Maritime Safety Authority's field monitoring of dispersed oil concentrations to validate S7.2 modelling. Where field data was unavailable, Asia-Pacific ASA took a "conservative approach" to modelling was taken and potential dispersed oil concentrations were overestimated to ensure further investigation by independent field monitoring teams from Western Australian Department of Fisheries and the Australian Institute of Marine Science.

Further studies The scientific studies triggered under the Montara Long Term Environmental Monitoring Program comprise: Shoreline Ecological Assessment Aerial Surveys (study S2); Assessments of Fish Catch for the Presence of Oil (study S3); Assessments of Effects on Timor Sea Fish and Fisheries (study S4); Offshore Banks Assessment Surveys (study S5); Shoreline Ecological Ground Surveys (study S6); and Oil Fate and Effects Assessments (study S7). Marine Megafauna Aerial Assessment Surveys (study S1) has not been triggered.

The Australian Government released the initial scientific reports S7 and S2 in November 2010 and further studies are expected to be released in the near future.

== Cause and investigation ==
PTTEPAA stated shortly after the leak was plugged that they had a theory about the cause of the leak but would not disclose nor confirm the cause until they had access to the Montara Wellhead Platform and could present a thorough appraisal.

On 5 November 2009, a Commission of Inquiry into the oil leak was announced. The inquiry, led by David Borthwick, had nearly all the powers of a Royal Commission. The report was to be presented by the end of April 2010; the commission delayed their report, however, until 18 June to further examine the causes and effects of the spill.

Elmer Danenberger, who used to be in charge of regulatory affairs for the U.S. Minerals Management Service, claimed that Halliburton had done a poor job cementing, a process that is supposed to fill the gaps around the casing with cement to prevent leaks of oil and gas, probably causing the spill. On 24 November 2010, Australian Resources and Energy Minister Martin Ferguson released the Report of the Montara Commission of Inquiry and a draft response from the Australian Government. The Report contained 100 findings and 105 recommendations. The Australian Government proposed accepting 92, noting 10, and not accepting three of the Report's recommendations. Commissioner David Borthwick's final report stated that while the source of the blowout was largely uncontested it was most likely that hydrocarbons entered the H1 Well through its 9 5/8 in (240 mm) cemented casing shoe and flowed up the inside of its 9 5/8 in (240 mm) casing. The Inquiry found that the primary well control barrier – the 9 5/8 in (240 mm) cemented casing shoe – failed. The final report by the Commission commended the spill response efforts by PTTEPAA, the Australian Maritime Safety Authority in its role as Combat Agency and the then Department of Environment, Water, Heritage and the Arts for its role as environmental regulator.

Minister Ferguson said the failure of the operator and regulator to adhere to Australia's oil and gas regulatory regime was a key factor in the Montara incident.

== Legal action and resolutions ==
Representatives from PTTEPAA held meetings with Indonesian government officials in Perth Western Australia on 27 July and 26 August 2010, to discuss the Indonesian government's claim for compensation. On 2 September 2010, PTTEPAA stated it did not accept any claim because no verifiable scientific evidence had been presented to the company to support the summary of claims presented by the Indonesian government. In October 2010, PTTEPAA announced its commitment to the Australian Government to fund a range of scientific studies aimed at determining any environmental impacts from the incident. The Commission during its inquiry took into account measures which could have been implemented to mitigate environmental damage.

In February 2011 PTT Exploration & Production Pcl (PTTEP) was cleared to keep operating in Australian waters after satisfying the Australian government that it had taken steps to prevent a repeat of the Montara blowout.

In 2012, PTTEP Australasia pleaded guilty to charges under the Offshore Petroleum and Greenhouse Gas Storage Act and was fined $510,000.

As of 2014, the fishermen of West Timor are represented by lawyer Greg Phelps with the support of the Indonesian government. Phelps believes an independent investigation into the oil spill's environmental and economic impact in Indonesia is necessary.

In August 2016, a class action suit was filed in Sydney, Australia representing the interests of over 13,000 Indonesian seaweed farmers whose livelihoods were affected by the spill and subsequent clean-up activities.

In December 2019, an international claim against Australia for transboundary harm, on behalf of 13 regencies of West Timor in Indonesia, was filed before the United Nations in Geneva, by the West Timor Care Foundation. The claim is represented by Monica Feria-Tinta, a barrister specialising in public international law.

== Transfer of ownership ==
PTTEP sold its 100% stake in the Montara field in 2018. Operatorship transfer to Singapore-based Jadestone Energy is expected to be completed in Q3 2019 pending final regulatory assessment.

== See also ==
- Environmental issues in Australia
- List of oil spills
