= Fingal Head Light =

Lighthouse in New South Wales, Australia

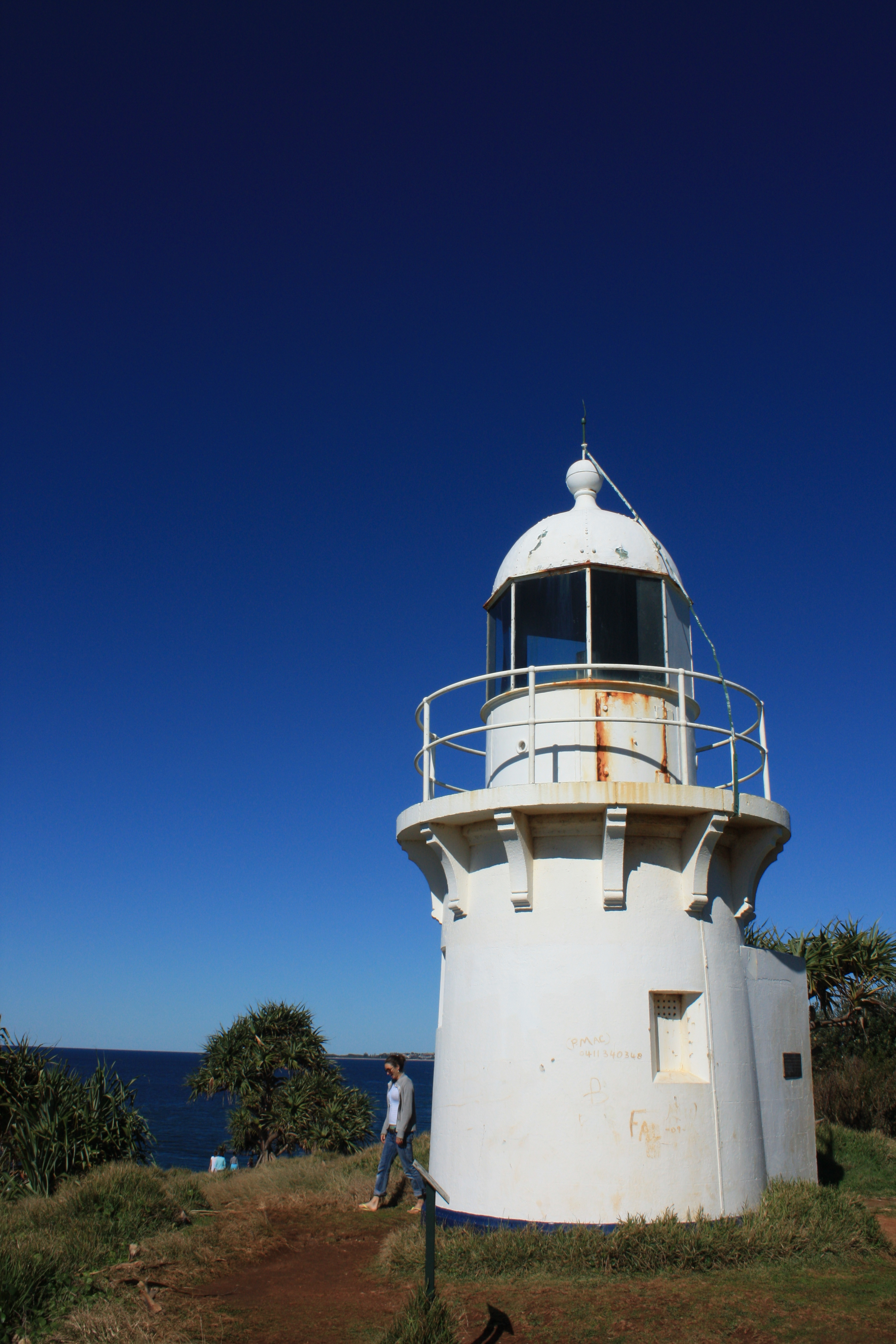
- Fingal Head Light, 2009
- Location: Fingal Head, New South Wales, Australia
- Coordinates: 28°12′00″S 153°34′15″E

Tower
- Constructed: 1872
- Construction: concrete (foundation), sandstone (tower)
- Automated: 1920
- Height: 23 ft (7.0 m)
- Shape: cylindrical tower with balcony and lantern
- Markings: White (tower), white (lantern)
- Power source: mains electricity
- Operator: Australian Maritime Safety Authority

Light
- First lit: 1878
- Focal height: 80 ft (24 m)
- Lens: fourth order catadioptric
- Intensity: 37,000 candela
- Range: 17 nmi (31 km; 20 mi) (white), 14 nmi (26 km; 16 mi) (red)
- Characteristic: Fl WR 5s

Fingal Head Light is an active lighthouse located at Fingal Head, New South Wales, Australia, a headland about 5 kilometres (3.1 mi) south of Point Danger, which marks the Queensland border.

== History ==
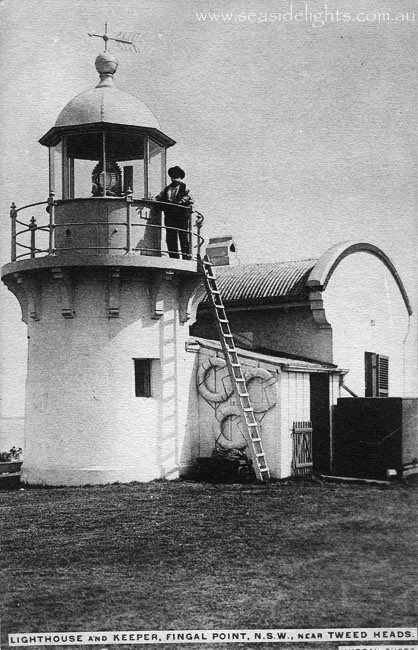
An historical view of the lighthouse pre-1920, with the lightkeeper of the day

The station was first established on 19 February 1872, a wooden pole structure of approximately 30 feet (9.1 m), holding a fixed kerosene wick burner which shone a fixed white light with an intensity of 1,000 cd. It was described by a daughter of William Arnold, the first lighthouse keeper, as being shaped like a large meat safe, mounted on a wooden structure resembling a pigeon loft. The keeper had to row from the Tweed Heads Pilot Station each day and light the lantern at sunset, and a hut was constructed for him to stay in.

In October 1878 the Maritime Board of New South Wales decided to construct a modern lighthouse at the location. It was the third of five lighthouses of similar design designed by James Barnet in 1878–80, the other four being Richmond River Light, Clarence River Light (now demolished), Tacking Point Lighthouse and Crowdy Head Light. It originally had a porch and an annexe serving as oil room. A four-room, single-storey lighthouse keeper's house was constructed about 20 metres (66 ft) northwest of the tower. The lighthouse and keeper's cottage were constructed by Joseph William Mortley and Shepherd who were successful with their government tender.

On 15 June 1920 the light was converted to an automatic carbide lamp (acetylene gas) apparatus, with an intensity of 1,500 cd, and altered to group flashing. Soon after, the station was demanned and all buildings other than the tower were demolished.

In 1980 the light was converted to electricity. The current light source is a modern FA-251 Beacon with a 12 Volt 75 Watt HL-2000 quartz halogen lamp. It is fed by mains electricity with a Battery standby. It revolves once every 30 seconds.

The current light characteristic is a flash every five seconds, red to east and white to other directions (Fl.W.R. 5s). It is partially obscured.

== Structure ==
The circular tower is made from bricks and cement rendered from the outside. It is capped by an oversailing bluestone platform at 12 feet (3.7 m) above ground levels, supported by shaped bluestone corbels. The platform is surrounded by a handrail of metal standards and rails. It is topped by the domed lantern housing the optical apparatus, a fourth order catadioptric.

== Site operation ==
The light is operated by Transport for NSW. The site is managed by the New South Wales Department of Lands.

== Visiting ==
The light is accessible by road from the Pacific Highway just south of the Tweed River. Parking is provided, and there is also a public beach and a picnic area just north of the lighthouse. The tower itself, however, is closed to the public.

== See also ==
- List of lighthouses in Australia
