= Australian Marine Oil Spill Centre =

- Formation: 1991
- Type: NGO
- Purpose: Accident response
- Headquarters: Geelong, Victoria
- Region served: Australian territorial water and parts of Indonesian and Papua New Guinean waters
- Parent organisation: Australian Institute of Petroleum
- Website: www.amosc.com.au

The Australian Marine Oil Spill Centre (AMOSC) is an organisation set up by the petroleum industry to enable a quick and effective response to oil spills around the Australian coastline. The organisation is owned by the Australian Institute of Petroleum and is financed by nine participating oil companies and other industry-related companies.

It was established in 1991 and the following year moved its base to Geelong, Victoria. Its establishment was a direct result of a review conducted by the Australian oil industry following the Exxon Valdez oil spill.

== Accident response ==
The Centre has an equipment stockpile on 24-hour stand-by. The AMOSplan is voluntary mutual aid arrangement where oil company equipment may be shared to best respond to a spill. AMOSplan replaced the former Marine Oil Spills Action Plan (MOSAP). The MOSAP was activated when an oil spill became too large for an individual company to adequately deal with.

Integration with government responses to spills is framed within the National Plan to Combat Pollution of the Sea by Oil, which is managed by the Australian Maritime Safety Authority.

== Major incidents ==
In 2009, AMOSC responded to the Montara oil spill in the Timor Sea by mobilising aircraft and dispersant for aerial spraying.

== See also ==
- Petroleum industry in Western Australia
