= Crowdy Head =

Coordinates: 31°50.7′S 152°45.3′E

Crowdy Head New South Wales
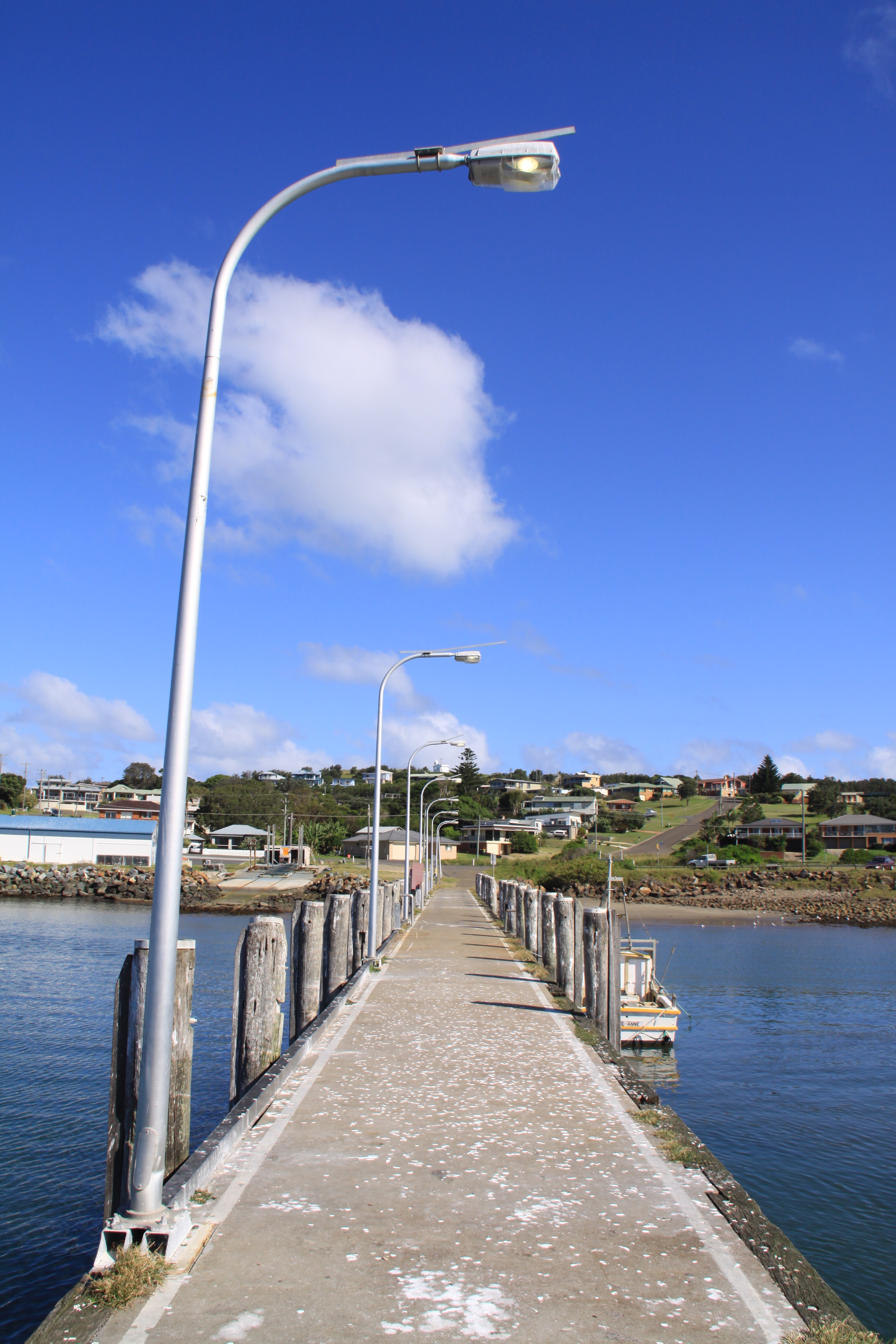
- Crowdy Head Jetty
- Population: 77 (2016 census)
- Postcode(s): 2427
- LGA(s): Mid-Coast Council
- State electorate(s): Port Macquarie
- Federal division(s): Lyne

Crowdy Head is a headland on the coast of New South Wales, Australia, 7 km from Harrington between Forster and Port Macquarie. The head is mostly cleared and was quarried between 1895 and 1901 for the Manning River training wall.

Crowdy Head is the site of Crowdy Head Light, a 24 feet (7.3 m) tall lighthouse built in 1878. And has a small harbour with a dedicated Marine Rescue NSW rescue boat, It is also home to Crowdy Head Surf Life Saving Club.
