= Richmond River Light =

Lighthouse in New South Wales, Australia

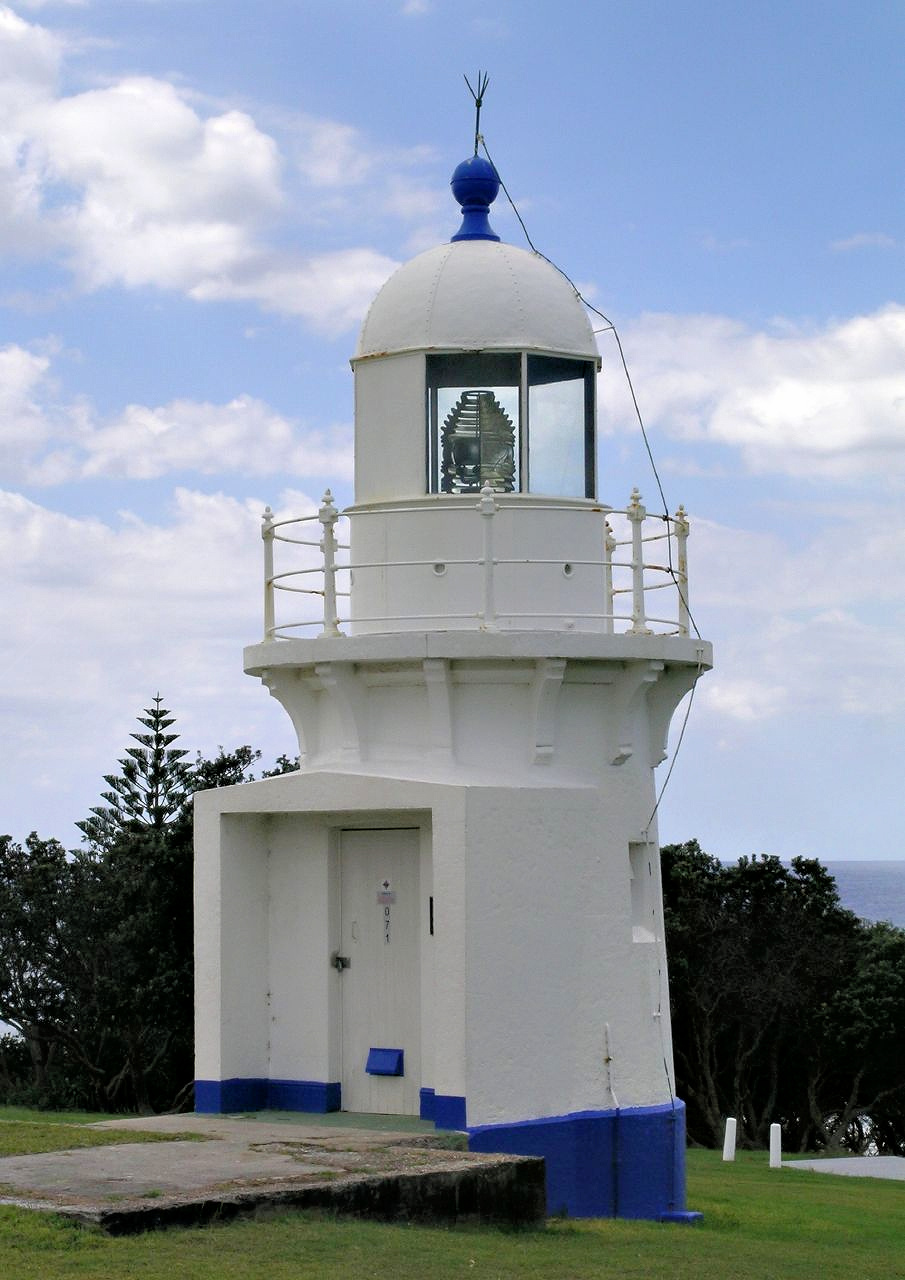
- Richmond River Light, 2006
- Location: Ballina, New South Wales; Australia
- Coordinates: 28°52′1.31″S 153°35′30.49″E

Tower
- Constructed: 1866
- Construction: stone tower
- Automated: 1920
- Height: 25 feet (7.6 m)
- Shape: cylindrical tower with balcony and lantern
- Markings: white tower and lantern
- Power source: mains electricity
- Operator: NSW Maritime

Light
- First lit: 1880
- Focal height: 115 feet (35 m)
- Lens: 4th order catadioptric (original), 2nd order Chance Brothers Fresnel lens (current)
- Intensity: 28,000 cd
- Range: 14 nautical miles (26 km; 16 mi)
- Characteristic: Fl (4) W 16s.

Richmond River Light, also known as Ballina Head Light and Ballina Light, is an active lighthouse located at Ballina Head, a headland in Ballina, New South Wales, Australia. The headland is at the northern side of the entrance to the Richmond River. It used to serve to guide ships into the river port and is used also serves as a leading light into the river, together with a steamer's masthead lantern with a 200 mm lens which is raised on a wooden structure 30 metres (98 ft) from it.

The nearby beach, Lighthouse Beach, one of Ballina's main beaches, is named for it.

== History ==
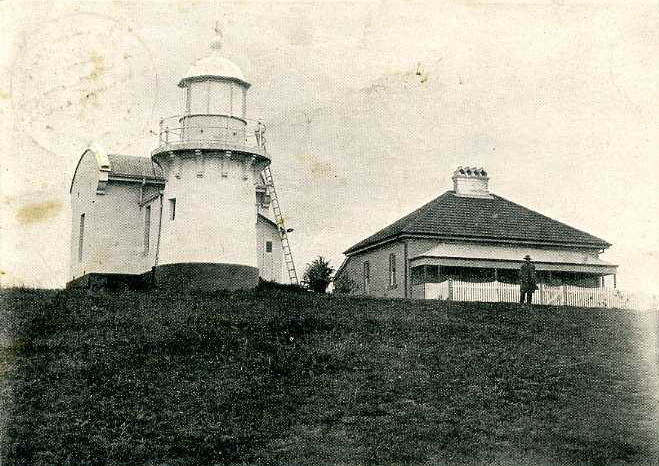
A historic view of Richmond River Light.

The station was established with a temporary light that was installed in 1866 from plans by James Barnet, at the same time of the installation of the Clarence River Light.

The current lighthouse is one of five lighthouses of similar design designed and built by James Barnet in 1878–80, the other four being Fingal Head Light, Clarence River Light (now demolished), Tacking Point Lighthouse and Crowdy Head Light. A tender was called in 1878, it was built in 1879 and lit in 1880.

The apparatus was a fixed light 4th order catadioptric apparatus of less than 1000 cd and was visible for 12 nautical miles (22 km; 14 mi). It was powered by colza oil. As the light was operated in conjunction with a nearby pilot station, only one light keeper was required.

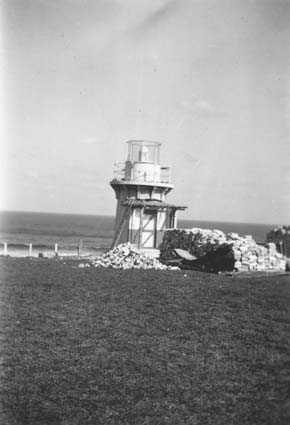
Demolition of the porch and annexe, November 1940

In 1920 the light was converted to acetylene gas and automated. In November 1940, the annexe and the porch connected to the lighthouse were demolished.

The light was electrified in the 1960s. The current light source is a 28,000 cd, 1,000 Watt 120 Volt tungsten-halogen lamp, and the power source is the Mains with a Battery standby. It shows a light characteristic of four white flashes every 16 s (Fl.(4)W. 16s)

== Structure ==
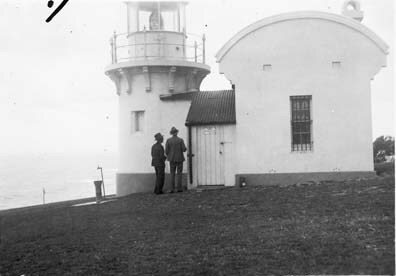
The lighthouse in 1930

The tower is very similar in design to the other four lighthouses. It is circular, 6 feet (1.8 m) in diameter (internally), with walls tapering from 19 inches (480 mm) at the bottom to 14 inches (360 mm) at the top. The tower is constructed of stone, and cement rendered, and painted white. On top of the tower there is an oversailing bluestone platform, supported at by twelve bluestone corbels, at about 12 feet (3.7 m) above the ground. The platform can be reached by an iron stair inside the tower. Around the perimeter of the platform is a metal handrail. The platform is topped by the simple metal dome which houses the optical apparatus.

Originally the lighthouse had a porch, rectangular annexe for the duty room and oil store. These were all demolished in November 1940. A one-story keeper's house is still present at the premises.

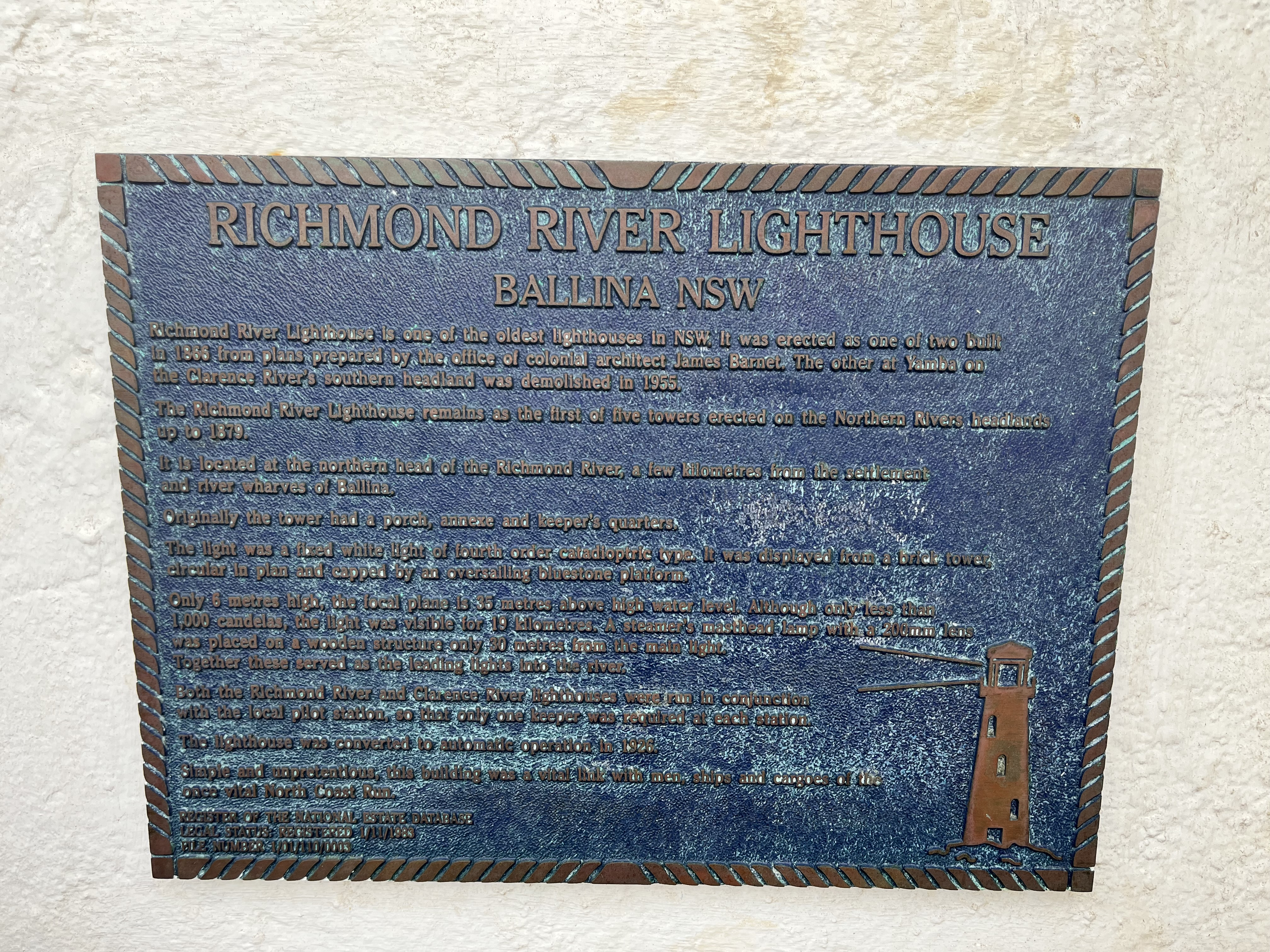
A sign near the entry of the lighthouse regarding historical significance including entry on the Register of the National Estate.

== Site operation ==
Richmond River Lighthouse is listed on the Register of National Estate held by the Australian Heritage Commission (Commonwealth Government) in 1983; this listing is defunct as this list was closed in 2007. However, it is also listed under the North Coast Regional Environmental Plan 1988 and the Ballina Local Environmental Plan 1987.

The light is currently operated by Transport for NSW and the site is managed by the New South Wales Department of Lands.

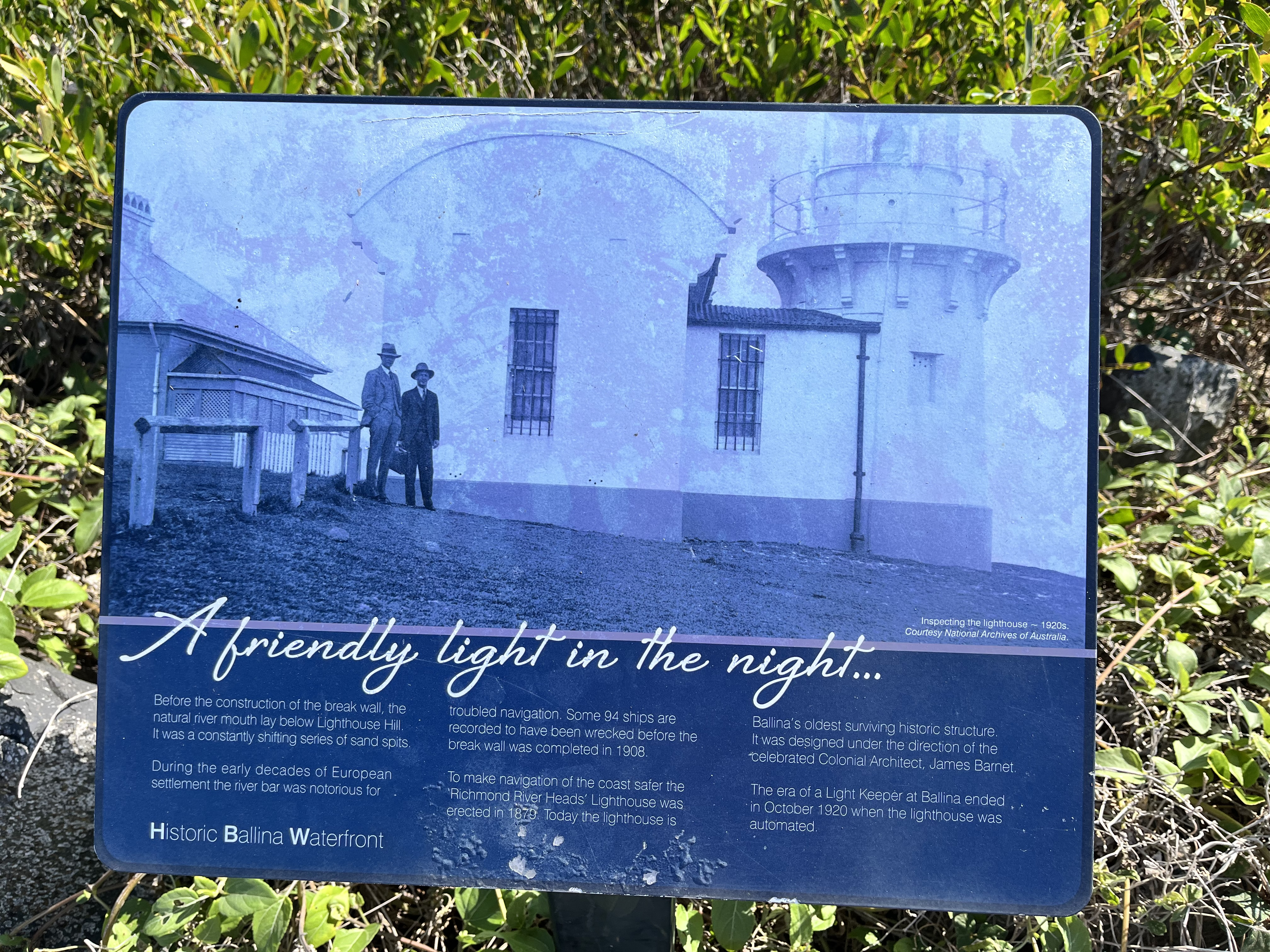
Inforrnamtion about the lighthouse on interpretive signage around Shaws Bay, East Ballina. This is a part of the sign series "Historic Ballina Waterfront".

== Visiting ==
The site is open to the public and accessible, but the tower is closed.

== See also ==
- List of lighthouses in Australia
