= Crowdy Head Light =

Lighthouse in New South Wales, Australia

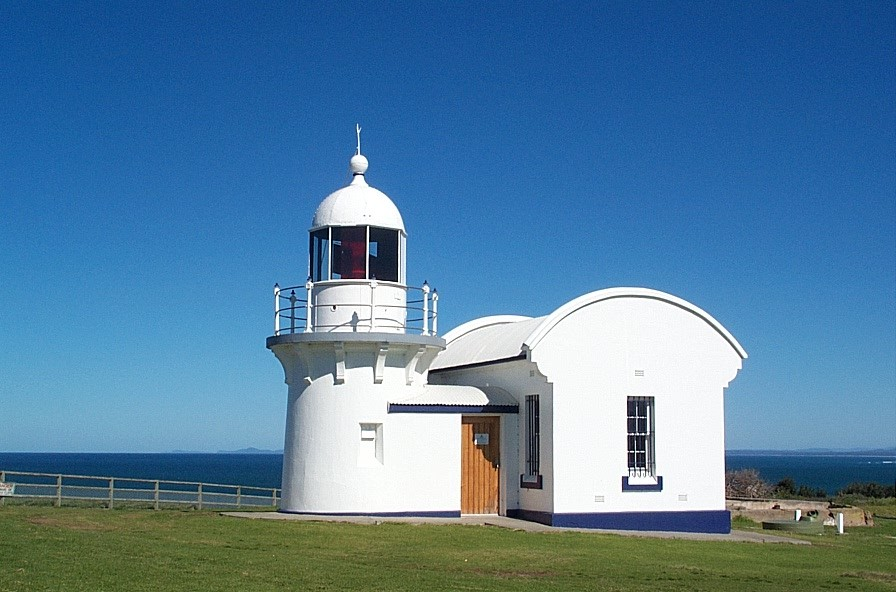
- Crowdy Head Light, 2008
- Location: Crowdy Head; New South Wales; Australia
- Coordinates: 31°50′36.32″S 152°45′12.79″E

Tower
- Constructed: 1878
- Foundation: concrete slab
- Construction: limestone
- Automated: 1928
- Height: 24 feet (7.3 m)
- Shape: cylindrical tower with balcony and lantern attached to one-story service builtding
- Markings: white tower and lantern
- Power source: mains electricity
- Operator: Australian Maritime Safety Authority
- Heritage: Australian Department of Environment

Light
- Focal height: 201 feet (61 m)
- Lens: Sealite SL-300 single-tier high intensity beacon
- Intensity: 28,000 cd
- Range: white: 16 nautical miles (30 km) red: 13 nautical miles (24 km)
- Characteristic: Fl (2) W 10s. Fl R (to northeast.)

Crowdy Head Light is an active lighthouse located at Crowdy Head, a headland between Forster and Port Macquarie, New South Wales, Australia. It is registered with the Register of the National Estate.

== History ==
The first station in the area was a pilot station established in 1860 at nearby Harrington, assisting ships navigating the entrance of the Manning River.

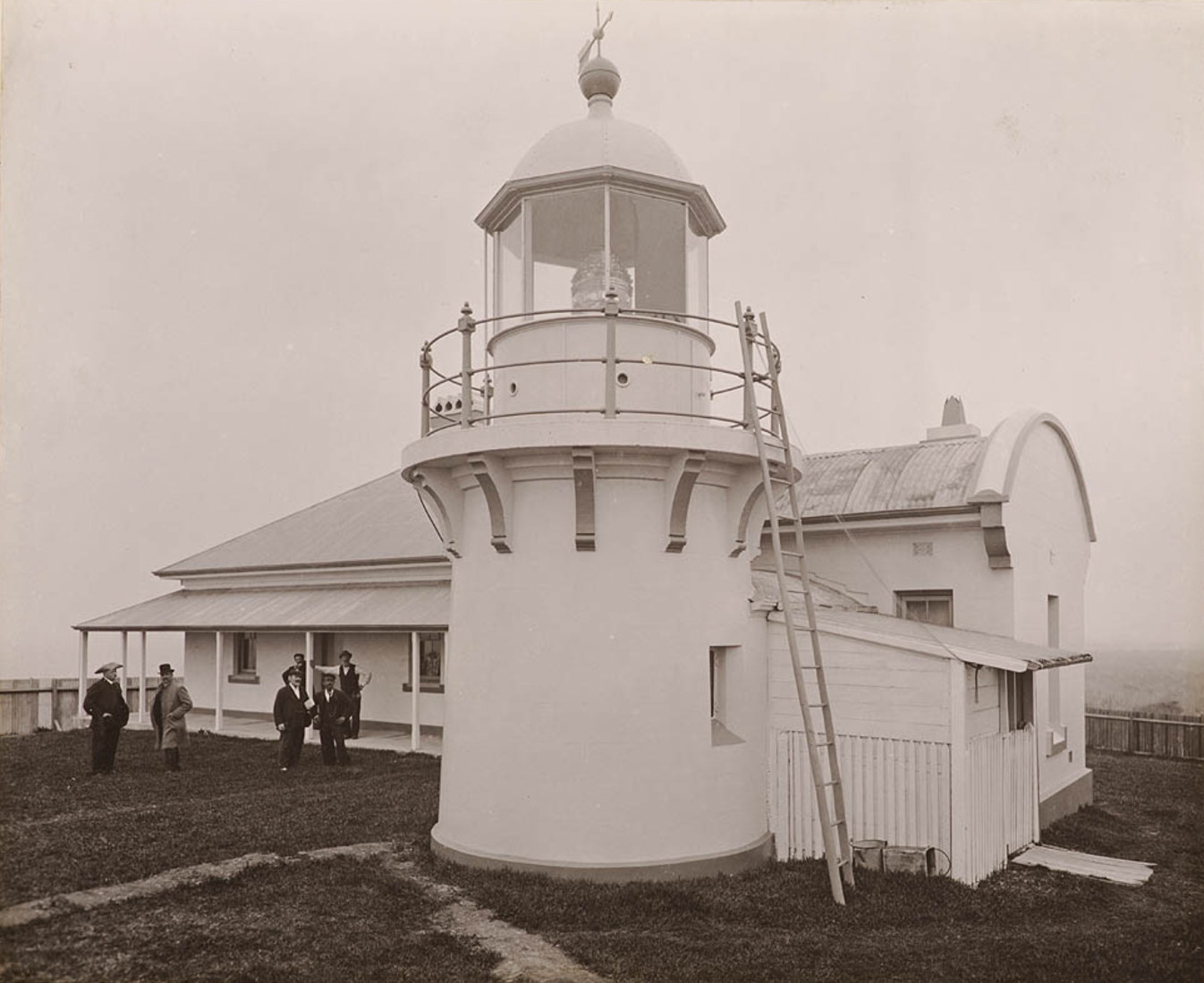
Crowdy Head Light and quarters, 1902.

The current lighthouse is the last of five lighthouses of similar design designed and built by James Barnet in 1878–80, the other four being Fingal Head Light, Clarence River Light (now demolished), Tacking Point Lighthouse and Richmond River Light. The original light was a fixed white light from a 4th-order catadioptric apparatus with an intensity of less than 1,000 cd. It was staffed by one keeper.

In 1928 the apparatus was converted to a carbide lamp (acetylene gas), with an intensity of 1,500 cd. At the same opportunity, the light was automated.

The pilot station was closed in the 1960s. In 1972 the light was converted to mains electricity.

In 2002 the 4th-order Fresnel lens was sold on eBay for $20,000 and is now on display at Sea Girt Light in New Jersey.

In 2021, conversion to an LED light source was completed with the addition of a Sealite SL-300 single tier high-intensity beacon with a range of 16 nautical miles.

== Structure ==
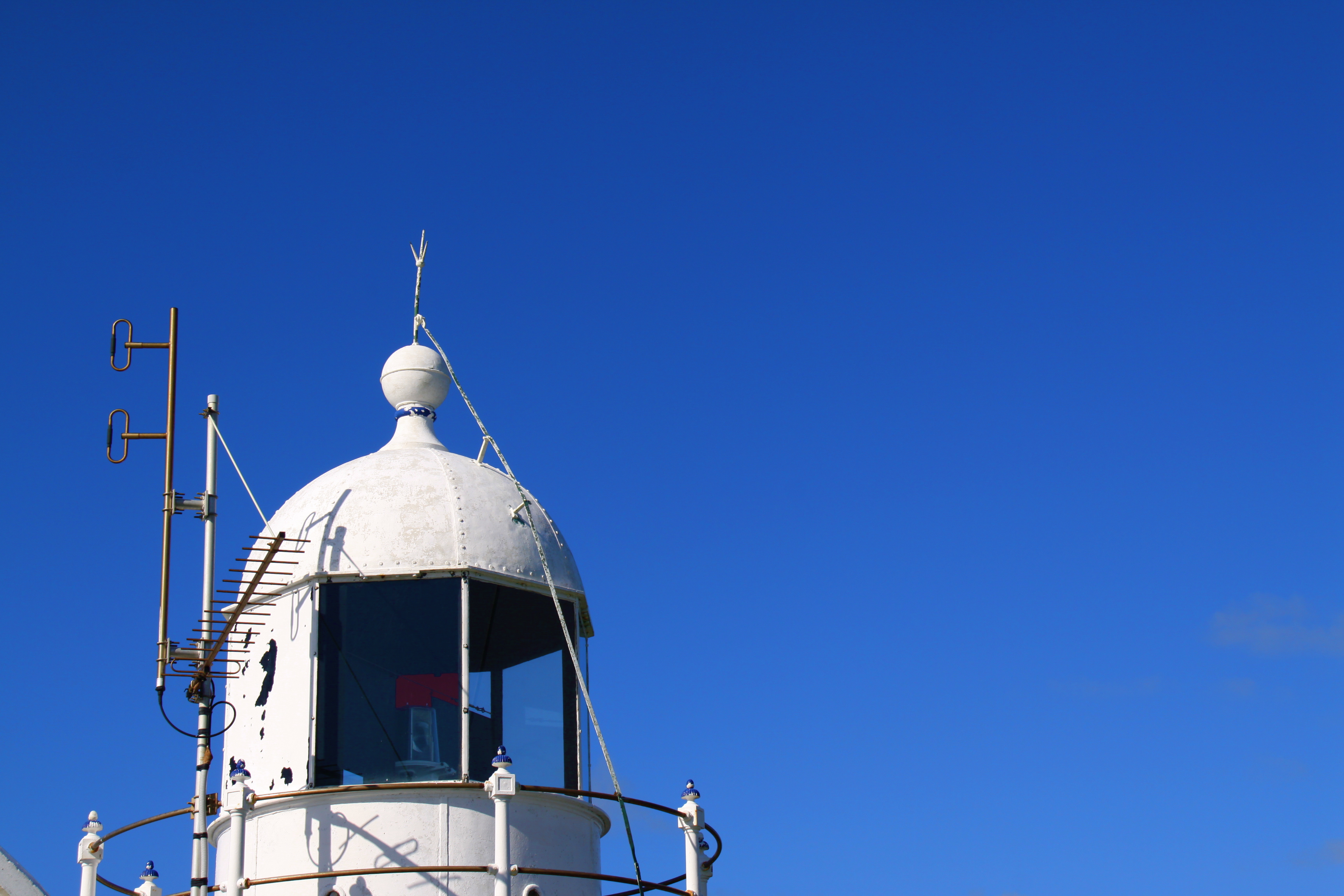
Crowdy Head Light, detail of the lamp.

The circular tower is capped by an oversailing bluestone platform supported by shaped bluestone corbels. It can be reached by a metal stair from the concrete slab, which forms the ground floor and foundation for the buildings. The tower walls of stone bricks taper off from a thickness of 19 inches (480 mm) at the base to 14 inches (360 mm) at the top.

A porch, roofed just above door height, connects the tower to a rectangular annexe, which originally contained a duty room for the keeper and a store for fuel

All the external walls of the structure are cement-rendered and painted white. The platform is surmounted by a simple metal domed lantern which encloses the optical apparatus. A handrail at the platform perimeter is of white painted cast iron standards with wrought iron rails.

== Site operation ==
The light is managed by Transport for NSW, while the site is managed by the New South Wales Department of Lands.

== Visiting ==
The grounds of the lighthouse are open, but the tower is closed.

== See also ==
- List of lighthouses in Australia
