= Australian Institute of Petroleum =

- Formation: 1976
- Type: NGO
- Purpose: petroleum industry
- Headquarters: Canberra
- Region served: Australia
- Main organ: board of directors
- Website: www.aip.com.au

The Australian Institute of Petroleum (AIP) is a representative body for Australia's petroleum industry. it was established in 1976 and Its headquarters a located in Canberra. The formation of the AIP aimed to foster industry self-regulation and facilitate productive communication among the oil industry, government, and the community. It served as a platform for promoting effective dialogue and cooperation. The AIP took over the role of the Petroleum Information Bureau, an organization that had been active in Australia since the early 1950s, among other entities.

The body is managed by a board composed of chief executives, senior representatives and an executive director. The organisation aims to support the development of sustainable, internationally competitive petroleum products industry.

The four core members are Ampol, BP, Mobil and Shell. Its members own and operate all oil refineries in Australia.

The AIP owns the Australian Marine Oil Spill Centre. It is a member of the Australian Industry Greenhouse Network. The AIP produces a weekly fuel report detailing average prices for transport fuels by location.

== See also ==
- Energy in Australia
- Road transport in Australia
