= Australian Aerial Patrol =

The Australian Aerial Patrol is an aerial observation and support service in New South Wales, Australia. It was formed in 1957 following a meeting convened by the City of Greater Wollongong Council, with a charter to maintain the safety and the welfare of the community through aerial observation and support. The Aerial Patrol is available to respond to emergencies 24 hours a day, 365 days a year.

== Services ==
The Aerial Patrol operates regular shark spotting and beach safety patrols along the coastline between Palm Beach (north of Sydney) and Mollymook on the New South Wales South Coast. The patrols take place on Saturdays, Sundays and public holidays from October to April and provide recreational safety for swimming, surfing, boating, fishing, bushwalking and other activities, as well as monitoring potential bushfire hazards.

In recent years, the Aerial Patrol has expanded its service to the south east region of New South Wales and, through its affiliation with VRA Rescue NSW, to inland regions of the territory. The patrol is accredited as a specialist agency in accordance with the State Rescue Manual, administered by the NSW Rescue and Emergency Services Board, to assist and support all land- and marine-based emergency services.

In 1993, the Australian Aerial Patrol was accredited by the Civil Aviation Safety Authority as a Search and Rescue (SAR) Unit, which was expanded between 2001 and 2007 to a Tier 1 SAR capability – the highest level of civilian fixed-wing SAR in the Commonwealth and only one of three such organisations at that time. Parallel to that, a working agreement was reached in 1993 between the Aerial Patrol and the Australian Volunteer Coast Guard by the Minister for Emergency Services, the only such agreement between a marine agency and an aerial support agency in Australia.

== Funding and personnel ==
The Aerial Patrol, as a Registered Charity, relies entirely on community fundraising programmes to pay for its operational costs, the most successful of which is the promotion of annual raffles over a 20-year period. Four local government bodies within Illawarra and Shoalhaven provide funding towards the operations, as well as a regional sponsorship by the Bendigo Bank and support from various clubs and local companies. Furthermore, a number of fundraising campaigns are conducted throughout the year, which together raise the half a million dollars a year required to ensure the continued operation of the service.

Aerial Patrol personnel are volunteers, rostered for duty 365 days a year, during daylight hours only. The air crew consists of commercial pilots, airborne observers, accredited dropmasters / dispatchers, and any time ERS and radio communications officers.

To support its emergency operations, the Aerial Patrol has introduced a commercial department that includes pilot training and aircraft engineering division under the name NSW Air. These have generated successful revenue streams for its community operations. Additionally, the pilot training has streamlined various aspects of the emergency operations through specialised techniques provided via a Commercial training syllabus. The Aerial Patrol is based at the Illawarra Regional Airport at Albion Park south of Sydney.
