= Australian Maritime Safety Authority =

Australian authority for maritime obligations

Statutory authority overview
- Formed: 1990
- Type: Corporate Commonwealth entity
- Jurisdiction: Australian exclusive economic zone
- Headquarters: Canberra, ACT
- Motto: Safe and clean seas, saving lives
- Employees: 476.5
- Minister responsible: Hon Catherine King, MP, Minister for Infrastructure, Transport, Regional Development and Local Government
- Statutory authority executives: Captain Jeanine Drummond, Chair; Kaylene Dale, CEO
- Website: www.amsa.gov.au

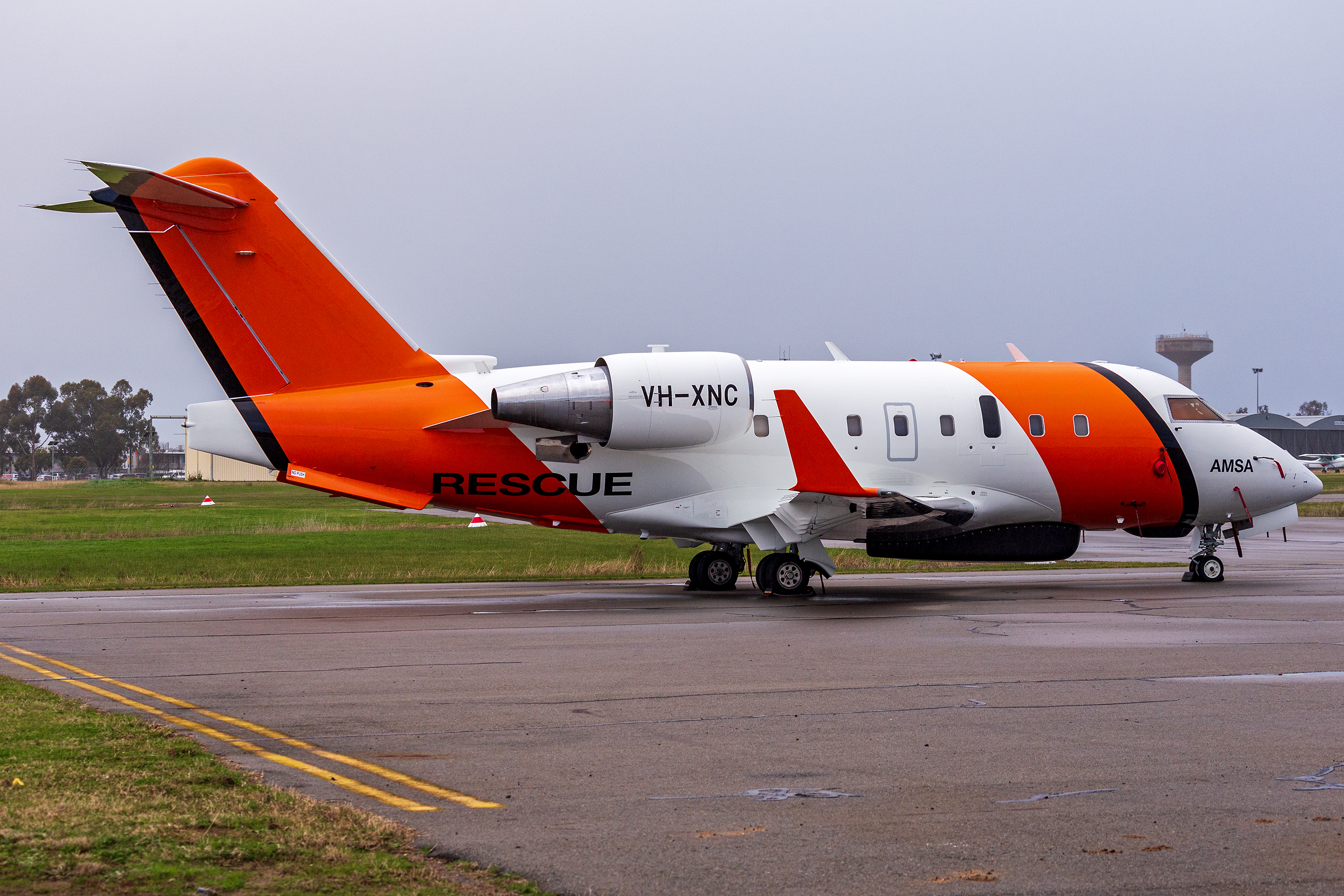
Bombardier Challenger 604, operated by Surveillance Australia, at Wagga Wagga Airport, 2023

Australian Maritime Safety Authority (AMSA) is an Australian statutory authority responsible for the operation of Australian flag state activities, domestic and international commercial vessel regulation, search and rescue coordination, beacon registration and international maritime obligations. The authority has jurisdiction over Australia's exclusive economic zone which covers an area of 11,000,000 square kilometres (4,200,000 sq mi).

AMSA was established in 1990 under the Australian Maritime Safety Authority Act 1990 and is governed by the Public Governance, Performance and Accountability Act 2013. As of 2025, AMSA is a statutory authority within the Department of Infrastructure, Transport, Regional Development, Communications and the Arts. Directors are appointed by the minister.

As part of its responsibilities AMSA administers international treaties such as the Maritime Labour Convention, International Convention for the Safety of Life at Sea (SOLAS) and International Convention on Salvage. These treaties are enforced using legislative instruments such as the Navigation Act 2012 and the Protection of the Sea (Prevention of Pollution from Ships) Act 1983.

AMSA is funded largely through levies and cost recovery measures on the shipping industry, however since 2010-11 financial year levies income has decreased by just under $14 million. Due to this and other factors, in the 2023-24 financial year, AMSA recorded expenses of just over $263 million, with revenue at just under $255 million, creating a deficit of more than $7.8 million.

== Functions ==
Marine safety activities of AMSA include:

- the provision, operation and maintenance of a network of marine aids to navigation, for example, lighthouses
- ensuring the seaworthiness and safe operation of Australian and foreign vessels in Australian waters, including the enforcement of compulsory pilotage
- administering the certification of seafarers
- the provision of a maritime distress and safety communications network
- the operation of Australia's Joint Rescue Coordination Centre and coordination of search and rescue (SAR) operations for civilian aircraft and vessels in distress and
- the development of a maritime safety commercial vessel legislative framework and operating system.
- representing Australia at international bodies such as the International Maritime Organization, International Organization for Marine Aids to Navigation, International Civil Aviation Organization and Asia-Pacific Heads of Maritime Safety Agencies.

AMSA aims to protect the marine environment by administering programs to prevent and respond to the threat of ship-sourced marine pollution; and together with the Australian Marine Oil Spill Centre, managing Australia's National Plan to combat pollution of the sea by oil and other noxious and hazardous substances.

It is responsible for administering MARPOL 73/78, an international marine environmental convention designed to minimize pollution of the seas. AMSA can instigate prosecutions itself, but mainly works with states and territories during investigations and enforcement activities such as vessel inspections.

Since its founding, AMSA has been involved with major changes in its regulatory environment such as the rewrite and replacement of the Navigation Act 1912 with the Navigation Act 2012, and the commencement and transition of all Domestic Commercial Vessels from the states and territories to AMSA under the Marine Safety (Domestic Commercial Vessel) National Law Act 2012.

== Shipping registers ==
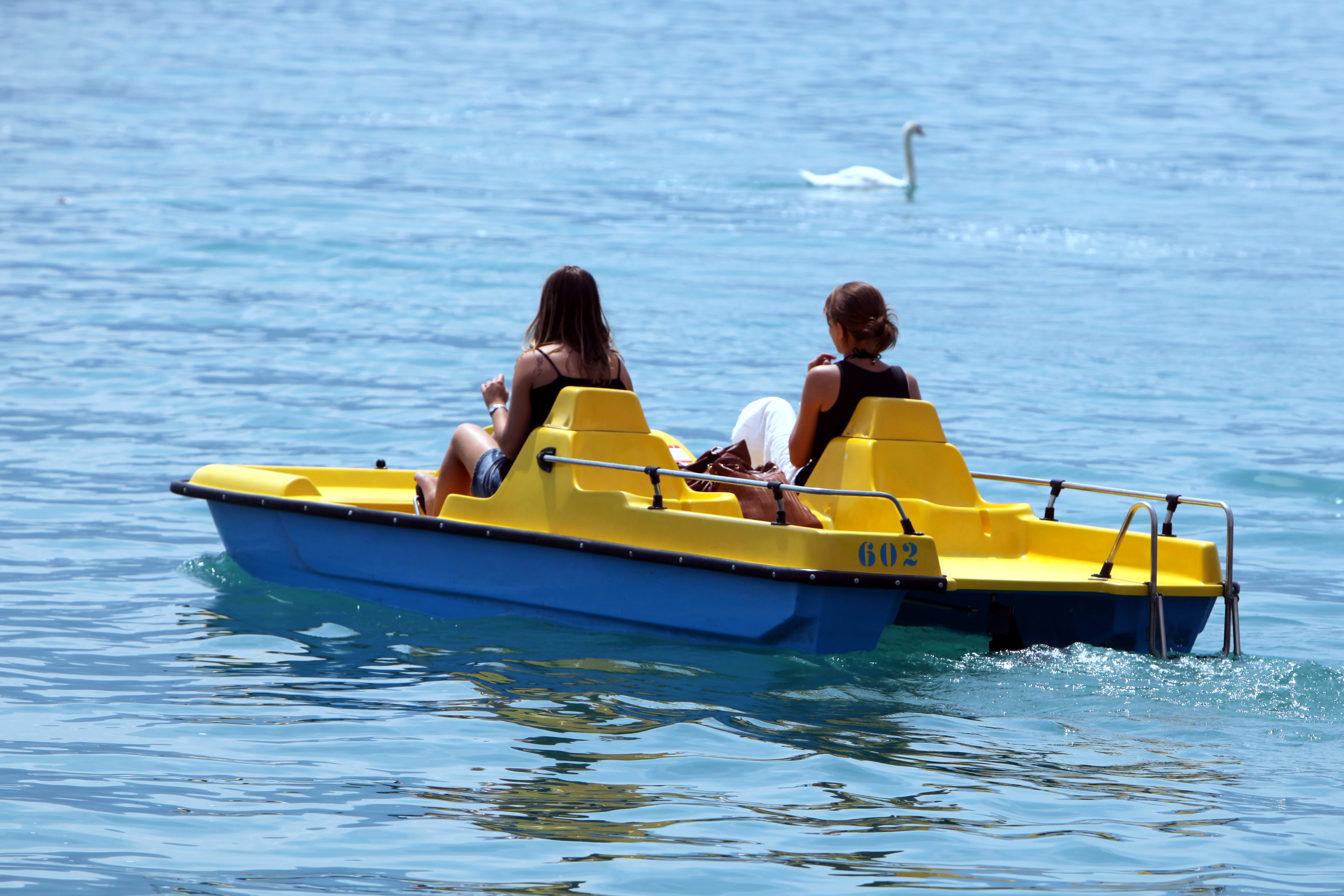
Regulation of pedalos is a new AMSA responsibility.

AMSA maintains two shipping registers. Ships registered on an Australian shipping register have Australian nationality for international shipping law purposes. Unless otherwise exempt, Australian owned ships are required to be registered on the general or international shipping register if it is a domestic commercial vessel, 24 metres or over in tonnage length, capable of navigating the high seas, or any vessel travelling overseas. Vessels engaging in international trading that are at least 24 metres in tonnage length and wholly owned or operated by Australian residents, or by Australian residents and Australian nationals may apply to be registered on the international register. There are tax incentives for ships on the international register to make the register competitive with other registers, such as vessels being operated with mixed crews, with the majority of officers and crew not being required to be Australian citizens or residents. AMSA has delegated certain survey and certification functions to a number of recognised classification societies, which are members of the International Association of Classification Societies.

The Council of Australian Governments (COAG) in 2011 directed AMSA to work co-operatively with the states and territories to create a national system for domestic commercial vessels, including any changes to Commonwealth, state and territory laws and administrative arrangements of the parties that are necessary to facilitate the reform. The new legislation came into effect in 2013, and the transition to the new system was completed in July 2018.

== Emergency towage vessel capability ==
Coral Knight
General characteristics
- Type: Emergency towage vessel
- Tonnage: 583 NRT; 1,945 GRT
- Length: 60.5 m (198 ft)
- Draught: 5.0 m (16.4 ft)
- Propulsion: 2× Azimuth thrusters; 2× variable pitch bow thrusters
- Speed: 13.8 kn (25.6 km/h; 15.9 mph)
- Capacity: Bollard pull: 82 tonne; Load capacity: 150 tonne line pull; Brake capacity: 200 tonne brake holding
- Towing equipment: 2× 1,000 metre 56 millimetre steel wire ropes; 2× 40 metre Plasma pennats; 2× 20 metre Dyneema pennats; 2× 2 metre v-thane wire rope chafe sleeves; 2× 88 millimetre akwaflex stretchers

Coral Knight is an anchor handling tug supply vessel modified to fulfil the role of dedicated emergency towage vessel (ETV). It is the only ETV of its type in Australia and operates in the particularly sensitive sea areas of the northern Great Barrier Reef and Torres Strait.

Coral Knight is also equipped to respond to other maritime incidents such as search and rescue or limiting the effects of ship-sourced pollution of the sea and carries oil pollution response equipment.

== Publications ==
The Authority publishes a range of materials in relation to maritime safety. As of 2011, its maritime survival manual Survival at Sea: A Training and Instruction Manual is in its 6th edition.

== See also ==
- Australian aerial patrol
- Coast Guards of Australia
