= Synaphea diabolica =

Conservation status
- Priority Three — Poorly Known Taxa (DEC)

Scientific classification
- Kingdom: Plantae
- Clade: Tracheophytes
- Clade: Angiosperms
- Clade: Eudicots
- Order: Proteales
- Family: Proteaceae
- Genus: Synaphea
- Species: S. diabolica

Binomial name
- Synaphea diabolica R.Butcher

Species of Australian shrub in the family Proteaceae

Synaphea diabolica is a species of flowering plant in the family Proteaceae and is endemic to the south-west of Western Australia. It is a clumped, sprawling subshrub with many woody stems, fan-shaped leaves and spikes of more or less crowded yellow flowers.

== Description ==
Synaphea diabolica is a clumped, sprawling subshrub that typically grows to up to 20–60 cm (7.9–23.6 in) height and 50–90 cm (20–35 in) wide and has many woody, pink to reddish-brown stems with patches of silky hairs. The leaves are fan-shaped, 43–103 mm (1.7–4.1 in) long and 36–103 mm (1.4–4.1 in) long, divided more than half-way into three lobes, each with up to three shortly triangular, sharply pointed lobes 0.5–5 mm (0.020–0.197 in) long and 12–43 mm (0.47–1.69 in) wide, the petiole 25–150 mm (0.98–5.91 in) long. The flowers are yellow and borne in moderately crowded spikes 73–131 mm (2.9–5.2 in) long on a peduncle 93–215 mm (3.7–8.5 in) long. The perianth has a narrow opening, the upper tepal 4.4–5.1 mm (0.17–0.20 in) long and 1.5–1.8 mm (0.059–0.071 in) wide and strongly curved forward over the anthers, the lateral tepals 4.4–5.2 mm (0.17–0.20 in) long. The stigma is oblong to egg-shaped, 1.2–1.3 mm (0.047–0.051 in) long and 1.4–1.7 mm (0.055–0.067 in) wide. Flowering occurs between late August and early November and the fruit is oval, 4.5–5.2 mm (0.18–0.20 in) long and 2.3–3.1 mm (0.091–0.122 in) wide and dark brown at maturity.

== Taxonomy ==
Synaphea diabolica was first formally described in 2007 by Ryonen Butcher in the journal Nuytsia from specimens collected at The Lakes in 1999. The specific epithet (diabolica) means 'diabolus', 'in reference to the complex taxonomic associations between this taxonomic and similar species".

== Distribution and habitat ==
This species of Synaphea is found on undulating areas in an area west and south-west of York in the Jarrah Forest bioregion of south-western Western Australia.

== Conservation status ==
Synaphea diabolica is listed as "Priority Three" by the Government of Western Australia Department of Biodiversity, Conservation and Attractions, meaning that it is poorly known and known from only a few locations but is not under imminent threat.
