= Synaphea canaliculata =

Conservation status
- Priority Two — Poorly Known Taxa (DEC)

Scientific classification
- Kingdom: Plantae
- Clade: Tracheophytes
- Clade: Angiosperms
- Clade: Eudicots
- Order: Proteales
- Family: Proteaceae
- Genus: Synaphea
- Species: S. canaliculata

Binomial name
- Synaphea canaliculata A.S.George

Species of Australian shrub in the family Proteaceae

Synaphea canaliculata is a species of flowering plant in the family Proteaceae and is endemic to the south-west of Western Australia. It is a shrub with widely spreading, pinnatipartite leaves usually with 3 to 7 pairs of lobes, and more or less crowded yellow flowers.

== Description ==
Synaphea canaliculata is a low, shrub that typically grows to a height of up to 40 cm (16 in) with branches up to 30 cm (12 in) long, with overlapping scales and leaf bases covered with woolly hairs. The leaves are pinnatipartite on a petiole 15–25 mm (0.59–0.98 in) long, with widely spreading lobes, the upper lobes 3-lobed, 25–35 mm (0.98–1.38 in) long the end-lobes linear, 1.5–1.0 mm (0.059–0.039 in) long and prominently channelled. The flowers are yellow and borne on more or less crowded spikes 10–50 mm (0.39–1.97 in) long on a peduncle 50 mm (2.0 in) long with broad, hairy bracts. The perianth has a narrow opening, the upper tepal 3.8–4.6 mm (0.15–0.18 in) long and 2.0–2.2 mm (0.079–0.087 in) wide, the lower tepal 3.0–3.5 mm (0.12–0.14 in) long. The stigma is oblong to more or less square, and the ovary is covered with soft hairs. Flowering occurs from August to October.

== Taxonomy ==
Synaphea canaliculata was first formally described in 1995 by Alex George in the Flora of Australia from specimens he collected between Newdegate and Lake King in 1994. The specific epithet (canaliculata) means 'channelled', referring to the leaves.

== Distribution and habitat ==
This species of Synaphea grows in sandy loam in kwongan and is locally common in a small area between Newdegate and Lake King in the Esperance Plains and Mallee bioregions of south-western Western Australia.

== Conservation status ==
Synaphea boyaginensis is listed as "Priority Two" by the Government of Western Australia Department of Biodiversity, Conservation and Attractions, meaning that it is poorly known and from one or a few locations.
