= Synaphea tamminensis =

Conservation status
- Priority Two — Poorly Known Taxa (DEC)

Scientific classification
- Kingdom: Plantae
- Clade: Embryophytes
- Clade: Tracheophytes
- Clade: Spermatophytes
- Clade: Angiosperms
- Clade: Eudicots
- Order: Proteales
- Family: Proteaceae
- Genus: Synaphea
- Species: S. tamminensis

Binomial name
- Synaphea tamminensis A.S.George

Species of Australian shrub in the family Proteaceae

Synaphea tamminensis is a species of flowering plant in the family Proteaceae and is only known a single location near Tammin in the south-west of Western Australia. It is a shrub with glabrous branchlets, deeply divided, hairy leaves, and spikes of yellow flowers.

== Description ==
Synaphea tamminensis is a shrub with stems up to 50 cm (20 in) long and covered with soft hairs that are hidden by the leaf bases. The leaves are multiplanar, 50–100 mm (2.0–3.9 in) long and 60–140 mm (2.4–5.5 in) wide on a petiole 60–150 mm (2.4–5.9 in) long, the end lobes linear to lance-shaped, 2–3 mm (0.079–0.118 in) long with a fine network of veins. The flowers are yellow, somewhat crowded on a spike 40–80 mm (1.6–3.1 in) long on a openly branched peduncle 120–200 mm (4.7–7.9 in) long. The bracts are 1.5–2.0 mm (0.059–0.079 in) long and almost glabrous. The perianth is ascending with a more or less narrow opening and glabrous. The upper tepal is 4–5 mm (0.16–0.20 in) long, about 2 mm (0.079 in) wide, more or less straight and slightly curved downwards, the lower tepal 3.2 mm (0.13 in) long. The stigma is trapezoid and more or less flat, 0.8 mm (0.031 in) long and 1 mm (0.039 in) wide and the ovary is covered with silky hairs. Flowering occurs in August and September, and the fruit is barrel-shaped, about 2 mm (0.079 in) long and covered with soft hairs.

== Taxonomy ==
Synaphea tamminensis was first formally described in 1995 by Alex George in the Flora of Australia from specimens he found in the Charles Gardner Flora Reserve south of Tammin. The specific epithet (tamminensis) means 'native of Tammin'.

== Distribution and habitat ==
This species of Synaphea is only known from the type location where it grows in sandy loam over laterite, in open kwongan.

== Conservation status ==
Synaphea tamminensis is listed as "Priority Two" by the Western Australian Government Department of Biodiversity, Conservation and Attractions, meaning that it is poorly known and from only one or a few locations.
