= Synaphea flexuosa =

Conservation status
- Priority Two — Poorly Known Taxa (DEC)

Scientific classification
- Kingdom: Plantae
- Clade: Tracheophytes
- Clade: Angiosperms
- Clade: Eudicots
- Order: Proteales
- Family: Proteaceae
- Genus: Synaphea
- Species: S. flexuosa

Binomial name
- Synaphea flexuosa A.S.George

Species of Australian shrub in the family Proteaceae

Synaphea flexuosa is a species of flowering plant in the family Proteaceae and is endemic to the south-west of Western Australia. It is a much-branched, tangled, small shrub with deeply forked leaves with linear, curved to winding lobes, spikes of mostly widely spaced yellow flowers and hairy fruit.

== Description ==
Synaphea flexuosa is a much-branched, tangled small shrub with stems up to 15 mm (0.59 in) long and covered by silky leaf bases. The leaves are deeply three to five times forked, 50–110 mm (2.0–4.3 in) long and 80–200 mm (3.1–7.9 in) wide on a petiole 50–110 mm (2.0–4.3 in) long, the leaves with linear, curved to winding lobes 1.5–3 mm (0.059–0.118 in) wide. The flowers are yellow and borne in several rather widely spaced spikes 40–150 mm (1.6–5.9 in) long on the ends of branches on hairy peduncles 30–70 mm (1.2–2.8 in) long. There are hairy, widely spreading bracts 1.5 mm (0.059 in) long. The perianth is more or less horizontal, slightly curved, moderately open and glabrous. The upper tepal is 4.5 mm (0.18 in) long and 2 mm (0.079 in) wide, the lower tepal 3.5 mm (0.14 in) long. The stigma is oblong and two-lobed, 0.8 mm (0.031 in) long and 1.0 mm (0.039 in) wide. Flowering occurs in September and October and the fruit is 4 mm (0.16 in) long, spreading and covered with soft hairs.

== Taxonomy ==
Synaphea flexuosa was first formally described in 1995 by Alex George in the Flora of Australia from specimens he collected south-east of Kulin in 1994. The specific epithet (flexuosa) means 'zig-zagged', referring to the leaf lobes.

== Distribution and habitat ==
This species of Synaphea grows is sandy loam in tall open shrubland south-east of Kulin and near Nyabing in the Mallee bioregion of south-western Western Australia.

== Conservation status ==
Synaphea flexuosa is listed as "Priority Two" by the Government of Western Australia Department of Biodiversity, Conservation and Attractions, meaning that it is poorly known and from one or a few locations.
