= Synaphea oligantha =

Scientific classification
- Kingdom: Plantae
- Clade: Tracheophytes
- Clade: Angiosperms
- Clade: Eudicots
- Order: Proteales
- Family: Proteaceae
- Genus: Synaphea
- Species: S. oligantha

Binomial name
- Synaphea oligantha A.S.George

Species of Australian shrub

Synaphea oligantha is a species of flowering plant in the family Proteaceae and is endemic to coastal areas of southern Western Australia. It is a tangled shrub with deeply divided leaves with linear to triangular lobes and spikes of yellow flowers enclosed within the foliage.

== Description ==
Synaphea nexosa is a tangled shrub with few to many, simple or branched stems up to 90 cm (35 in) long and covered with soft hairs. Its leaves are deeply divided, 50–130 mm (2.0–5.1 in) long and 80–120 mm (3.1–4.7 in) wide, on a petiole 30–90 mm (1.2–3.5 in) long, with linear to triangular lobes 1.5–3 mm (0.059–0.118 in) wide. The flowers are borne in spikes up to 5 cm (2.0 in) long and enclosed in the foliage, on a branched peduncle up to 11 cm (4.3 in) long, with few flowers widely spaced on the spikes. There are softly hairy bracts 1.0–1.5 mm (0.039–0.059 in) long at the base of the peduncle. The perianth is ascending with a narrow opening, the upper tepal 3.5–4.0 mm (0.14–0.16 in) long and 1.4–1.8 mm (0.055–0.071 in) wide, the side tepals curved and the lower tepal 3.0 mm (0.12 in) long. The stigma is shaped like a trapezoid and notched, 0.6–0.8 mm (0.024–0.031 in) long, 0.7–0.8 mm (0.028–0.031 in) wide with an ovary covered with soft hairs. Flowering occurs from July to September and the fruit is oval and beaked, 5–6 mm (0.20–0.24 in) long.

== Taxonomy ==
Synaphea oligantha was first formally described in 1995 by Alex George in the Flora of Australia from specimens he collected 1.6 km (0.99 mi) north of Mount Le Grand in the Cape Le Grand National Park in 1971. The specific epithet (oligantha) means 'few-flowered'.

== Distribution and habitat ==
This species of Synaphea occurs from the Fitzgerald River National Park and Twilight Cove along the south coast on flats and dunes in the Esperance Plains, Hampton and Mallee bioregions of Western Australia, where it grows in sandy soils.

== Conservation status ==
Synaphea oligantha is listed as "not threatened" by the Government of Western Australia Department of Biodiversity, Conservation and Attractions.
