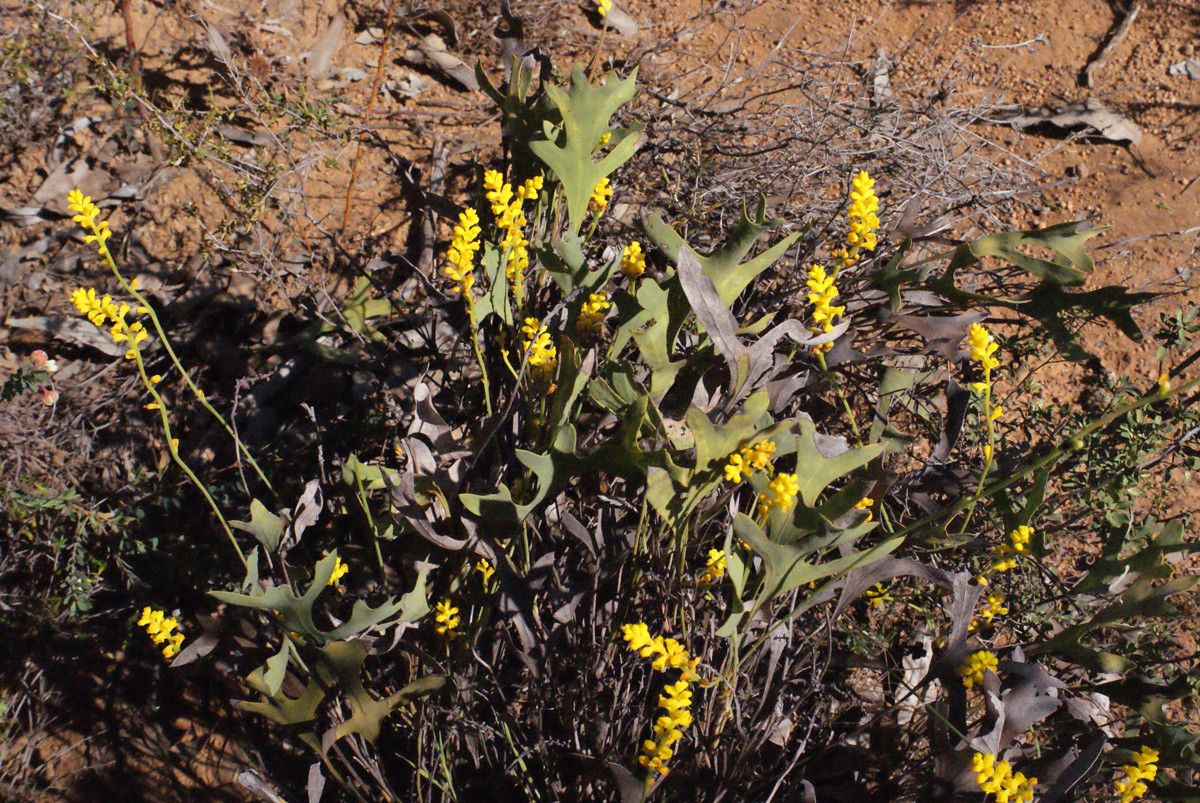

Scientific classification
- Kingdom: Plantae
- Clade: Tracheophytes
- Clade: Angiosperms
- Clade: Eudicots
- Order: Proteales
- Family: Proteaceae
- Genus: Synaphea
- Species: S. gracillima

Binomial name
- Synaphea gracillima Lindl.

= Synaphea gracillima =

Species of Australian shrub in the family Proteaceae

Synaphea gracillima is a species of flowering plant in the family Proteaceae and is endemic to the south-west of Western Australia. It is a tufted shrub with several to many stems, pinnatipartite leaves with the end lobes broadly linear to lance-shaped, spikes of yellow flowers and narrowly oval fruit.

== Description ==
Synaphea gracillima is a tufted shrub with several to many branched stems up to 80 mm (3.1 in) long, covered with soft hairs at first. The leaves are pinnatipartite, 60–190 mm (2.4–7.5 in) long and 60–150 mm (2.4–5.9 in) wide with several lobes, on a petiole 100–170 mm (3.9–6.7 in) long. The upper lobes are also pinnatipartite, the lower lobes less divided, the end lobes broadly linear to lance-shaped, 3–9 mm (0.12–0.35 in) wide, more or less flat and covered with soft hairs when young. The flowers are yellow and borne in more or less openly spaced spikes 60–150 mm (2.4–5.9 in) long and much longer than the leaves.The flowers are borne on a peduncle 100–170 mm (3.9–6.7 in) long with spreading bracts at the base. The perianth opens widely and is glabrous, the upper tepal 4.5–6 mm (0.18–0.24 in) long and 1.5–2.0 mm (0.059–0.079 in) wide, the lower tepal 3.5–4.5 mm (0.14–0.18 in) long. The stigma is oblong to crescent moon-shaped, 0.8–1.0 mm (0.031–0.039 in) long and 1.0–1.5 mm (0.039–0.059 in) wide. Flowering occurs from August to October and the fruit is narrowly egg-shaped, 5.0–5.7 mm (0.20–0.22 in) long and covered with a few soft hairs.

== Taxonomy ==
Synaphea gracillima was first formally described in 1839 by John Lindley in A Sketch of the Vegetation of the Swan River Colony from specimens collected by James Drummond near the Swan River Colony. The specific epithet (gracillima) means 'very thin' or 'very slender'.

== Distribution and habitat ==
This species of Synaphaea grows in lateritic soil in jarrah-marri woodland on the Darling plateau between Bindoon and Manjimup, and west to Margaret River and east to Albany in the Avon Wheatbelt, Esperance Plains, Jarrah Forest, Swan Coastal Plain and Warren bioregions of south-western Western Australia.

== Conservation status ==
Synaphea gracillima is listed as "not threatened" by the Government of Western Australia Department of Biodiversity, Conservation and Attractions.
