= Synaphea hians =

Conservation status
- Priority Three — Poorly Known Taxa (DEC)

Scientific classification
- Kingdom: Plantae
- Clade: Tracheophytes
- Clade: Angiosperms
- Clade: Eudicots
- Order: Proteales
- Family: Proteaceae
- Genus: Synaphea
- Species: S. hians

Binomial name
- Synaphea hians A.S.George

Species of Australian shrub in the family Proteaceae

Synaphea hians is a species of flowering plant in the family Proteaceae and is endemic to the south-west of Western Australia. It is a prostrate or low-lying shrub with hairy branchlets, wedge-shaped leaves with three lobes, spikes of more or less crowded yellow flowers and broadly oval fruit.

== Description ==
Synaphea hians is a prostrate or low-lying shrub that typically grows to a height of 0.15–0.6 m (5.9 in – 1 ft 11.6 in) high and up to 1 m (3 ft 3 in) wide, with hairy stems up to 50 cm (20 in) long, that later become glabrous. The leaves are wedge-shaped, more or less wavy with three lobes, 40–100 mm (1.6–3.9 in) long and 25–45 mm (0.98–1.77 in) wide, on a hairy petiole 40–150 mm (1.6–5.9 in) long. The lobes of the leaves are triangular, sometimes with one or two teeth with a small point on the tip. The flowers are yellow and borne in more or less crowded spikes 40–100 mm (1.6–3.9 in) long on a peduncle up to 250 mm (9.8 in) long. There are spreading, hairy, tapered bracts 3–6 mm (0.12–0.24 in) long at the base of the peduncles. The perianth opens widely, the upper tepal gently to strongly curved, 6.5–7.5 mm (0.26–0.30 in) long and 2.8–3.5 mm (0.11–0.14 in) wide, the lower tepal 4.5–6 mm (0.18–0.24 in) long. The stigma is oblong with erect to curved horns, 1.7–2.5 mm (0.067–0.098 in) long and about 1.8 mm (0.071 in) wide. Flowering occurs in September and October and the fruit is broadly oval, 3.0–3.5 mm (0.12–0.14 in) long and covered with soft hairs.

== Taxonomy ==
Synaphea hians was first formally described in 1995 by Alex George in the Flora of Australia from specimens he collected about 6 km (3.7 mi) east of Busselton on the road to Nannup in 1993. The specific epithet (hians) means 'gaping', referring to the perianth.

== Distribution and habitat ==
This species of Synaphea grows on sandy rises in low eucalypt woodland from east of Busselton to south of Collie in the Jarrah Forest and Swan Coastal Plain bioregions of south-western Western Australia.

== Conservation status ==
Synaphea hians is listed as "Priority Three" by the Government of Western Australia Department of Biodiversity, Conservation and Attractions meaning that it is poorly known and known from only a few locations but is not under imminent threat.
