= Synaphea intricata =

Conservation status
- Priority Three — Poorly Known Taxa (DEC)

Scientific classification
- Kingdom: Plantae
- Clade: Embryophytes
- Clade: Tracheophytes
- Clade: Spermatophytes
- Clade: Angiosperms
- Clade: Eudicots
- Order: Proteales
- Family: Proteaceae
- Genus: Synaphea
- Species: S. intricata

Binomial name
- Synaphea intricata A.S.George

Species of Australian shrub in the family Proteaceae

Synaphea intricata is a species of flowering plant in the family Proteaceae and is endemic to a restricted area in south-west of Western Australia. It is a slender shrub with soft hairs pressed against the surface, thrice pinnatipartite leaves, spikes of crowded yellow flowers and elliptic fruit on a narrow neck.

== Description ==
Synaphea intricata is a slender shrub with stems up to 50 cm (20 in) long and covered with soft hairs pressed against the surface, later glabrous. The leaves are thrice pinnatipartite, 20–40 mm (0.79–1.57 in) long, 40–70 mm (1.6–2.8 in) wide on a petiole 5–15 mm (0.20–0.59 in) long, and multiplanar. The end lobes are 0.5–1.5 mm (0.020–0.059 in) long with two or three sharply pointed, concave lobes. The flowers are yellow and borne in crowded spikes up to 70 mm (2.8 in) long on a peduncle up to 10 mm (0.39 in) long. The perianth has a narrow opening, the upper tepal 4.9–5.2 mm (0.19–0.20 in) long and 2.2 mm (0.087 in) wide, the lower tepal 4.0–4.5 mm (0.16–0.18 in) long. The stigma is oblong and notched, 0.9 mm (0.035 in) long and 0.4 mm (0.016 in) wide. Flowering occurs from September to October, and the fruit is broadly elliptic, 4.5–5.5 mm (0.18–0.22 in) long with a narrow neck and hairy.

== Taxonomy ==
Synaphea intricata was first formally described in 1995 by Alex George in the Flora of Australia from specimens he collected about 19 km (12 mi) south of the Muir Highway on the Nornalup Road in 1993. The specific epithet (intricata) means 'entangled', referring to the leaves of this species.

== Distribution and habitat ==
This species of Synaphea grows in sandy in open woodland and in peaty sand in swamps south of Rocky Gully in the Jarrah Forest and Warren bioregions of south-western Western Australia.

== Conservation status ==
Synaphea incurva is listed as 'Priority Three' by the Government of Western Australia Department of Parks and Wildlife, meaning that it is poorly known and known from only a few locations but is not under imminent threat.
