= Synaphea decumbens =

Conservation status
- Priority Three — Poorly Known Taxa (DEC)

Scientific classification
- Kingdom: Plantae
- Clade: Tracheophytes
- Clade: Angiosperms
- Clade: Eudicots
- Order: Proteales
- Family: Proteaceae
- Genus: Synaphea
- Species: S. decumbens

Binomial name
- Synaphea decumbens A.S.George

Species of Australian shrub in the family Proteaceae

Synaphea decumbens is a species of flowering plant in the family Proteaceae and is endemic to the south-west of Western Australia. It is a shrub with low-lying branches, wedge-shaped to fan-shaped leaves and spikes of moderately crowded yellow flowers.

== Description ==
Synaphea decumbens is a shrub with low-lying stems up to 70 cm (28 in) and covered with soft, spreading hairs. The leaves are wedge-shaped to fan-shaped, 40–100 mm (1.6–3.9 in) long and 25–50 mm (0.98–1.97 in) wide on a petiole 10–40 mm (0.39–1.57 in) long, the end lobes more or less triangular. The flowers are yellow and borne in moderately crowded spikes 40–50 mm (1.6–2.0 in) long on a peduncle 50–100 mm (2.0–3.9 in) long. The perianth has a wide opening, the upper tepal 6.0–6.5 mm (0.24–0.26 in) long and 2.8 mm (0.11 in) wide and very convex, the lower tepal 5.0–5.5 mm (0.20–0.22 in) long. The stigma is oblong, expanded at the base and notched. Flowering occurs in September and October.

== Taxonomy ==
Synaphea decumbens was first formally described in 1995 by Alex George in the Flora of Australia from specimens he collected near Moorinup Lake in 1971. The specific epithet (decumbens) means 'reclining'.

== Distribution and habitat ==
This species of Synaphea grows in sand over laterite in jarrah forest in the Jarrah Forest bioregion of south-western Western Australia.

== Conservation status ==
Synaphea decumbens is listed as "Priority Three" by the Government of Western Australia, Department of Biodiversity, Conservation and Attractions, meaning that it is poorly known and known from only a few locations, but is not under imminent threat.
