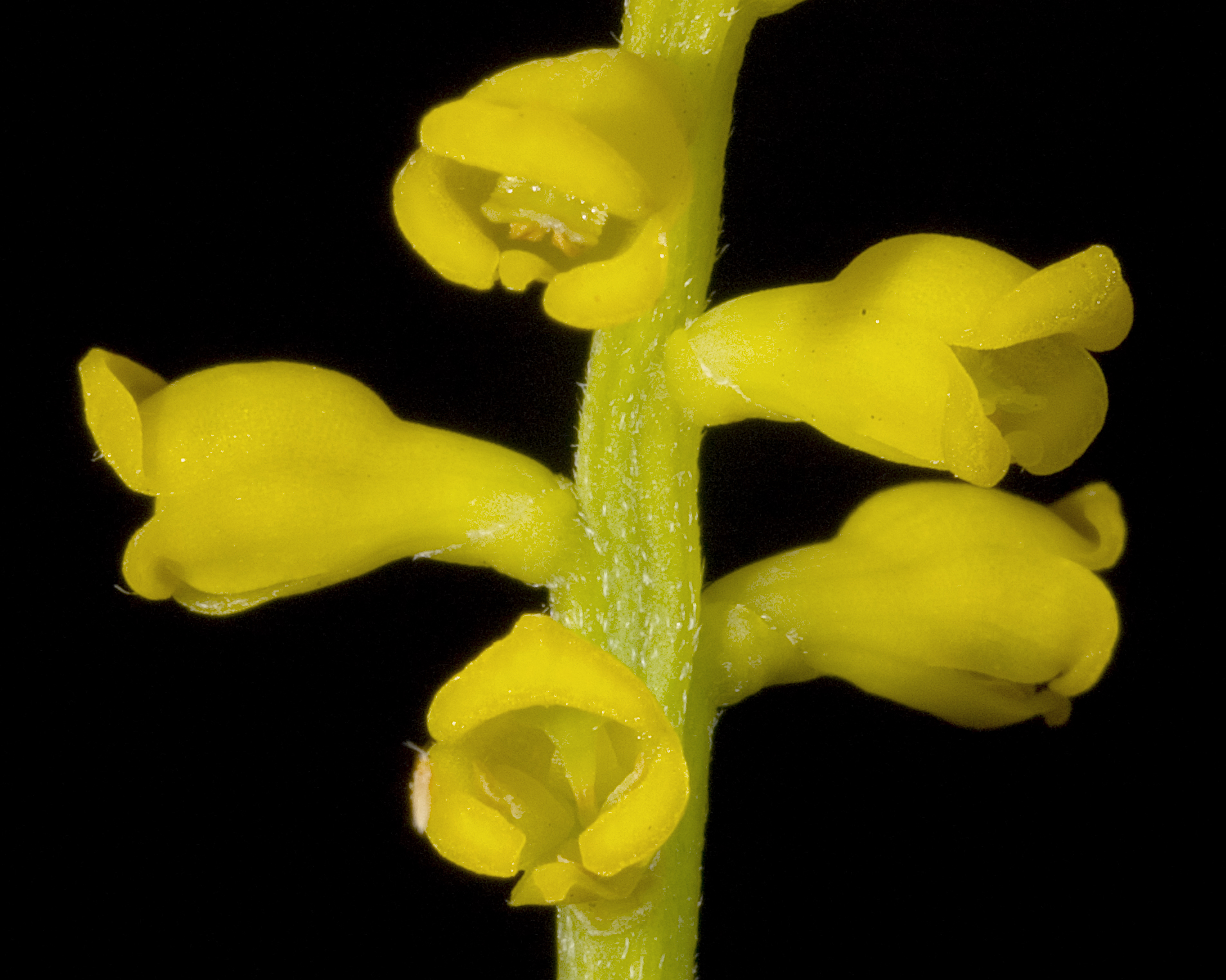

Scientific classification
- Kingdom: Plantae
- Clade: Tracheophytes
- Clade: Angiosperms
- Clade: Eudicots
- Order: Proteales
- Family: Proteaceae
- Genus: Synaphea
- Species: S. decorticans

Binomial name
- Synaphea decorticans Lindl.

= Synaphea decorticans =

Species of Australian shrub in the family Proteaceae

Synaphea decorticans is a species of flowering plant in the family Proteaceae and is endemic to the south-west of Western Australia. It is a dense shrub with pinnatipartite leaves, spikes of moderately crowded yellow flowers and elliptic fruit with a short beak.

== Description ==
Synaphea decorticans is a dense shrub that typically grows to a height of up to 60 cm (24 in) with stems up to 90 cm (35 in) long and covered with woolly hairs. The leaves are pinnatipartite, 100–140 mm (3.9–5.5 in) long and up to 200 mm (7.9 in) wide on a petiole 280 mm (11 in) long. The end lobes are lance-shaped, 5–10 mm (0.20–0.39 in) wide. The flowers are yellow and borne in moderately crowded spikes 50–100 mm (2.0–3.9 in) long on a peduncle up to 400 mm (16 in) long with spreading bracts 1.0–1.2 mm (0.039–0.047 in) long. The perianth has a wide opening, the upper tepal 5.0–5.6 mm (0.20–0.22 in) long and about 2.5 mm (0.098 in) wide and curved, the lower tepal about 4 mm (0.16 in) long. The stigma is almost square to shaped like a trapezium with the lobes bent back, shallowly to moderately notched, 0.9–1.1 mm (0.035–0.043 in) long and 1.5–1.6 mm (0.059–0.063 in) wide. Flowering occurs in September and October, and the fruit is elliptic on a short neck, 5–6 mm (0.20–0.24 in) long with a beak on the end.

== Taxonomy ==
Synaphea decorticans was first formally described in 1839 by John Lindley in his A Sketch of the Vegetation of the Swan River Colony. The specific epithet (decorticans) means 'with peeling bark', because Lindley believed a piece of bark from a different species, belonged to the type specimen.

== Distribution and habitat ==
This species of Synaphea grows in lateritic soil and is common in jarrah-marri forest on the Darling Scarp between Chittering and Collie in the Avon Wheatbelt, Jarrah Forest and Swan Coastal Plain bioregions of south-western Western Australia.

== Conservation status ==
Synaphea decorticans is listed as "not threatened" by the Government of Western Australia Department of Biodiversity, Conservation and Attractions.
