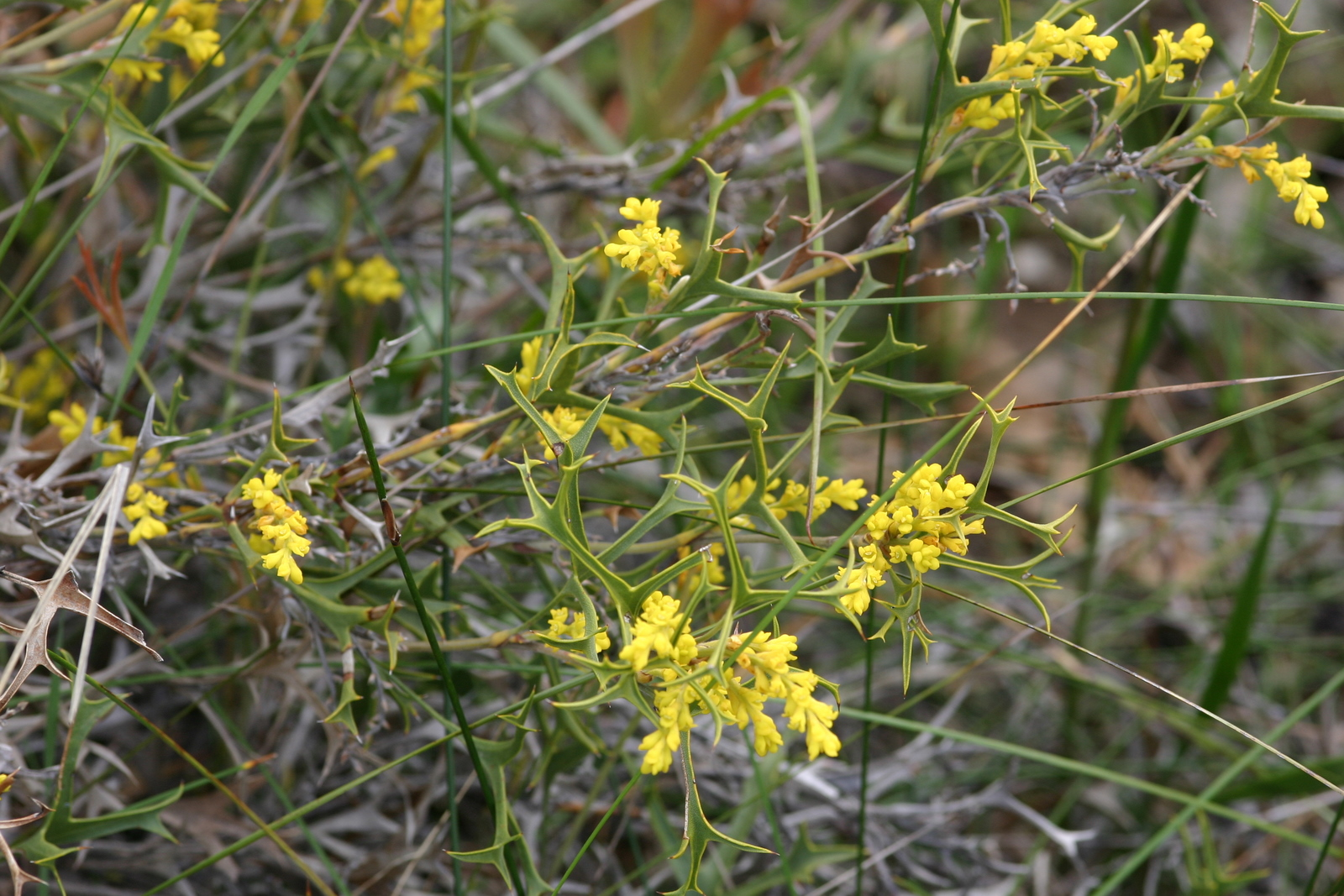
- Synaphea spinulosa subsp. spinulosa

Scientific classification
- Kingdom: Plantae
- Clade: Tracheophytes
- Clade: Angiosperms
- Clade: Eudicots
- Order: Proteales
- Family: Proteaceae
- Subfamily: Proteoideae
- Tribe: Conospermeae
- Subtribe: Conosperminae
- Genus: Synaphea; R.Br.

Type species
- Synaphea polymorpha R.Br.

= Synaphea =

Genus of shrubs endemic to Western Australia

Synaphea is a genus of flowering plants in the macadamia family Proteaceae, endemic to the southwestern corner of Western Australia. It contains 56 species as of April 2025, which are mostly small shrubs with variably shaped leaves but consistently yellow flowers with an unusual pollination mechanism. The genus was erected by botanist Robert Brown in 1810.

== Description ==
Plants in the genus Synaphea are small shrubs, usually with deeply lobed (pinnatipartite) leaves, although some have simple leaves, others pinnate leaves, and have a petiole with a sheathing base. The flowers are relatively small, bright yellow, usually unscented, and arranged in a spike in leaf axils or on the ends of branchlets. The perianth is tube-shaped and zygomorphic, the tube opening in the upper third to half. As in many other members of the Proteaceae, the male anthers and female style are initially in contact and the end of the style is a pollen presenter. In synapheas (and in Conospermum), the anthers and stigma are held together under tension and only separate when touched by a pollinator, ejecting the pollen. The fruit is a hard-shelled nut, but in most species seed set is low.

== Taxonomy ==
The genus Synaphea was first formally described in 1810 by Robert Brown in Transactions of the Linnean Society of London. The name Synaphea is from the Ancient Greek word synaphe meaning "a connection" or "a union", referring to a connection between a sterile anther and the stigma.

=== Species ===
The following is a list of formally named Synaphea species and subspecies accepted by the Australian Plant Census as at April 2020:

- Synaphea acutiloba Meisn. – granite synaphea
- Synaphea aephynsa A.S.George
- Synaphea bifurcata A.S.George
- Synaphea boyaginensis A.S.George
- Synaphea brachyceras R.Butcher
- Synaphea canaliculata A.S.George
- Synaphea cervifolia A.S.George
- Synaphea constricta A.S.George
- Synaphea cuneata A.S.George
- Synaphea damopsis A.S.George
- Synaphea decorticans Lindl.
- Synaphea decumbens A.S.George
- Synaphea diabolica R.Butcher
- Synaphea divaricata (Benth.) A.S.George
- Synaphea drummondii Meisn.
- Synaphea endothrix A.S.George
- Synaphea favosa R.Br.
- Synaphea flabelliformis A.S.George
- Synaphea flexuosa A.S.George
- Synaphea floribunda A.S.George
- Synaphea gracillima Lindl.
- Synaphea grandis A.S.George
- Synaphea hians A.S.George
- Synaphea incurva A.S.George
- Synaphea interioris A.S.George
- Synaphea intricata A.S.George
- Synaphea lesueurensis A.S.George
- Synaphea macrophylla A.S.George
- Synaphea media A.S.George
- Synaphea nexosa A.S.George
- Synaphea obtusata (Meisn.) A.S.George
- Synaphea odocoileops A.S.George
- Synaphea oligantha A.S.George
- Synaphea otiostigma A.S.George
- Synaphea oulopha A.S.George
- Synaphea pandurata R.Butcher
- Synaphea panhesya A.S.George
- Synaphea parviflora A.S.George
- Synaphea petiolaris R.Br.
  - Synaphea petiolaris R.Br. subsp. petiolaris
  - Synaphea petiolaris subsp. simplex A.S.George
  - Synaphea petiolaris subsp. triloba A.S.George
- Synaphea pinnata Lindl. – Helena synaphea
- Synaphea platyphylla A.S.George
- Synaphea polymorpha R.Br. – Albany synaphea
- Synaphea polypodioides R.Butcher
- Synaphea preissii Meisn.
- Synaphea quartzitica A.S.George – quartz-loving synaphea
- Synaphea rangiferops A.S.George
- Synaphea recurva A.S.George
- Synaphea reticulata (Sm.) Druce
- Synaphea sparsiflora A.S.George
- Synaphea spinulosa (Burm.f.) Merr.
  - Synaphea spinulosa subsp. borealis A.S.George
  - Synaphea spinulosa subsp. major A.S.George
  - Synaphea spinulosa (Burm.f.) Merr. subsp. spinulosa
- Synaphea stenoloba A.S.George
- Synaphea tamminensis A.S.George
- Synaphea trinacriformis R.Butcher
- Synaphea tripartita A.S.George
- Synaphea whicherensis A.S.George
- Synaphea xela R.Butcher

== Distribution ==
The genus is endemic to the southwestern corner of Western Australia, from near Kalbarri to about Nuytsland Nature Reserve.
