= Synaphea rangiferops =

Conservation status
- Priority Two — Poorly Known Taxa (DEC)

Scientific classification
- Kingdom: Plantae
- Clade: Embryophytes
- Clade: Tracheophytes
- Clade: Spermatophytes
- Clade: Angiosperms
- Clade: Eudicots
- Order: Proteales
- Family: Proteaceae
- Genus: Synaphea
- Species: S. rangiferops

Binomial name
- Synaphea rangiferops A.S.George

Species of Australian shrub

Synaphea rangiferops is a species of flowering plant in the family Proteaceae and is endemic to the south west of Western Australia. It is a shrub with lobed pinnatipartite leaves the lower leaves also lobed, and spikes of yellow flowers.

== Description ==
Synaphea rangiferops is a shrub with shaggy hairs and branched stems up to 19 cm (7.5 in) long. The leaves are pinnatipartite, 90–180 mm (3.5–7.1 in) long and 50–130 mm (2.0–5.1 in) wide on a petiole 50–110 mm (2.0–4.3 in) long, the lower two or three pairs of lobes, with one or two parts. The end lobes are linear to narrowly triangular, 1.5–4 mm (0.059–0.157 in) wide. The flowers are yellow and borne in spikes up to 120 mm (4.7 in) long on a branched, sparsely hairy peduncle 120–280 mm (4.7–11.0 in) long. The bracts are egg-shaped and spreading, 1–2 mm (0.039–0.079 in) long and mostly glabrous. The perianth has a moderately wide opening, the upper tepal 4.5–5.5 mm (0.18–0.22 in) long and 1.5 mm (0.059 in) wide and strongly curved, the lower tepal 2.5 mm (0.098 in) long. The stigma is oblong and shallowly notched, 0.7–0.8 mm (0.028–0.031 in) long and 0.5 mm (0.020 in) wide, mostly glabrous and the ovary is also mostly glabrous. Flowering occurs in August and September, and the fruit is elliptic, 5.0–6.5 mm (0.20–0.26 in) long and covered with soft hairs.

== Taxonomy ==
Synaphea rangiferops was first formally described in 1995 by Alex George in the Flora of Australia from specimens he found 10 km (6.2 mi) south-west of Calingiri in 1976. The specific epithet (rangiferops) means reindeer- or caribou-like, and refers to the leaf lobes that reminiscent of their antlers.

== Distribution and habitat ==
This species of synaphea occurs between Mogumber, Gillingarra and Calingiri where it grows in gravelly loam in kwongan

== Conservation status ==
Synaphea rangiferops is listed as "Priority Two" by the Government of Western Australia Department of Biodiversity, Conservation and Attractions, meaning that it is poorly known and from one or a few locations.
