= Synaphea incurva =

Conservation status
- Priority Three — Poorly Known Taxa (DEC)

Scientific classification
- Kingdom: Plantae
- Clade: Tracheophytes
- Clade: Angiosperms
- Clade: Eudicots
- Order: Proteales
- Family: Proteaceae
- Genus: Synaphea
- Species: S. incurva

Binomial name
- Synaphea incurva A.S.George

Species of Australian shrub in the family Proteaceae

Synaphea incurva is a species of flowering plant in the family Proteaceae and is endemic to the south of Western Australia. It is a low-lying shrub with hairy stems, lance-shaped or lobed leaves, spikes of moderately crowded yellow flowers and elliptic fruit on a narrow neck.

== Description ==
Synaphea incurva is a low-lying shrub with hairy stems up to 26 cm (10 in) long. The leaves are 70–150 mm (2.8–5.9 in) long, 6–12 mm (0.24–0.47 in) wide on a petiole 35–65 mm (1.4–2.6 in) long and lance-shaped or three-lobed to pinnatipartite. The flowers are yellow and borne in moderately crowded spikes 25–60 mm (0.98–2.36 in) long on a peduncle 50–210 mm (2.0–8.3 in) long. There are spreading, egg-shaped bracts 1.5–2 mm (0.059–0.079 in) long at the base of the peduncles. The perianth opens widely, the upper tepal more or less straight, 6.5–7.5 mm (0.26–0.30 in) long and 2.3–2.5 mm (0.091–0.098 in) wide, the lower tepal 6.0–6.5 mm (0.24–0.26 in) long. The stigma is egg-shaped and notched with curved lobes, 1.3–1.6 mm (0.051–0.063 in) long and 1.0–1.3 mm (0.039–0.051 in) wide. Flowering occurs in September and October and the fruit is elliptic with a narrow neck, 5–8 mm (0.20–0.31 in) long and glabrous or sparsely hairy.

== Taxonomy ==
Synaphea incurva was first formally described in 1995 by Alex George in the Flora of Australia from specimens he collected near Albany airport. The specific epithet (incurva) means 'bowed' or 'curved inwards', referring to the lobes of the stigma.

== Distribution and habitat ==
This species of Synaphea grows in jarrah-marri woodland or shrubland just west and north-west of Albany in the Esperance Plains, Jarrah Forest, Warren bioregions of southern Western Australia.

== Conservation status ==
Synaphea incurva is listed as "Priority Three" by the Government of Western Australia Department of Biodiversity, Conservation and Attractions meaning that it is poorly known and known from only a few locations but is not under imminent threat.
