= Synaphea sparsiflora =

Conservation status
- Priority Two — Poorly Known Taxa (DEC)

Scientific classification
- Kingdom: Plantae
- Clade: Embryophytes
- Clade: Tracheophytes
- Clade: Spermatophytes
- Clade: Angiosperms
- Clade: Eudicots
- Order: Proteales
- Family: Proteaceae
- Genus: Synaphea
- Species: S. sparsiflora

Binomial name
- Synaphea sparsiflora A.S.George

Species of Australian shrub

Synaphea sparsiflora is a species of flowering plant in the family Proteaceae and is only known from a few locations in the south-west of Western Australia. It is a shrub with hairy branchlets, wavy pinnatipartite leaves, the lowest leaves also pinnatipartite, and spikes of yellow flowers.

== Description ==
Synaphea sparsiflora is a shrub that typically grows to a height of 0.6–1 m (2 ft 0 in – 3 ft 3 in) with hairy branchlets, and stems up to 25 cm (9.8 in) long. The leaves are pinnatipartite, 50–90 mm (2.0–3.5 in) long and 100–150 mm (3.9–5.9 in) wide on a petiole 50–100 mm (2.0–3.9 in) long, the lowest pair of lobes also pinnatipartite. The flowers are yellow and widely spaced on spikes up to 50–120 mm (2.0–4.7 in) long on a branched peduncle 80–150 mm (3.1–5.9 in) long. The bracts are 2.5–3.0 mm (0.098–0.118 in) long and covered with soft hairs. The perianth is ascending and opens moderately widely, the lower half covered with soft hairs pressed against the surface. The upper tepal is 5.8–7 mm (0.23–0.28 in) long and 2.3–2.6 mm (0.091–0.102 in) wide and gently convex, the lower tepal 4.6–5.5 mm (0.18–0.22 in) long. The stigma is broadly egg-shaped and shallowly notched, more or less flat, 1.1 mm (0.043 in) long and wide and the ovary is covered with silky hairs. Flowering occurs in August and September, and the fruit is elliptic, 7 mm (0.28 in) long and hairy.

== Taxonomy ==
Synaphea sparsiflora was first formally described in 1995 by Alex George in the Flora of Australia from specimens he found on First North Road, just north of the Three Springs-Eneabba Road in 1993. The specific epithet (sparsiflora) means 'scattered-flowered'.

== Distribution and habitat ==
This species of synaphea is only known from near Eneabba in the Geraldton Sandplains bioregion and west of Gillingarra in the Swan Coastal Plain bioregion where it grows in sandy loam in kwongan in the south-west of Western Australia.

== Conservation status ==
Synaphea recurva is listed as 'Priority Two' by the Western Australian Government Department of Biodiversity, Conservation and Attractions, meaning that it is poorly known and from only one or a few locations.
