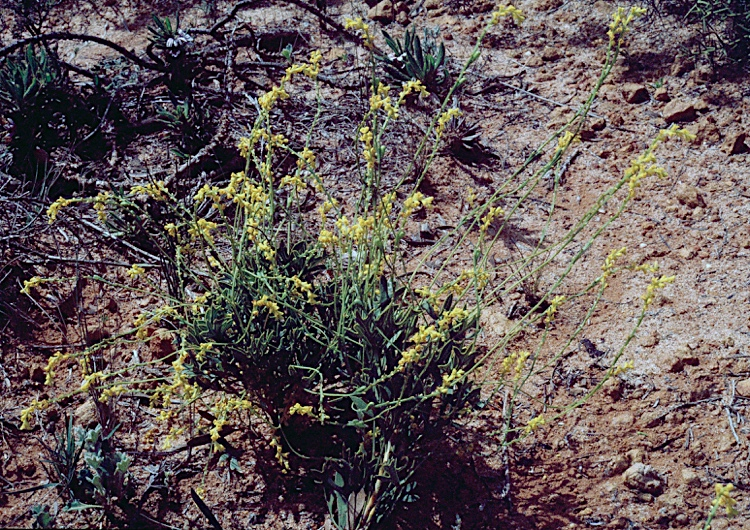

Conservation status
- Priority Two — Poorly Known Taxa (DEC)

Scientific classification
- Kingdom: Plantae
- Clade: Tracheophytes
- Clade: Angiosperms
- Clade: Eudicots
- Order: Proteales
- Family: Proteaceae
- Genus: Synaphea
- Species: S. lesueurensis

Binomial name
- Synaphea lesueurensis A.S.George

= Synaphea lesueurensis =

Species of Australian shrub in the family Proteaceae

Synaphea lesueurensis is a species of flowering plant in the family Proteaceae and is endemic to a restricted area in south-west of Western Australia. It is a shrub with many stems, tripartite leaves, spikes of openly-spaced yellow flowers, and oval fruit.

== Description ==
Synaphea lesueurensis is a shrub with many stems, each with few branches up to 50 cm (20 in) long and covered with soft hairs. Its leaves are tripartite, 50–60 mm (2.0–2.4 in) long and 60–80 mm (2.4–3.1 in) wide on a petiole 20–70 mm (0.79–2.76 in) long. The primary lobes have two or three lobes and the end lobes are flat, linear to lance-shaped, 2.5–5 mm (0.098–0.197 in) wide, and covered with soft hairs at first, but soon become glabrous. The flowers are borne on openly spaced spikes up to 100 mm (3.9 in) long on a branched peduncle up to 180 mm (7.1 in) long and hairy at the base, glabrous above. There are egg-shaped, spreading bracts 1.0–1.5 mm (0.039–0.059 in) long at the base of the peduncle. The perianth is ascending with a wide opening, the upper tepal 3.8–5.0 mm (0.15–0.20 in) long and 1.5–2.5 mm (0.059–0.098 in) wide, the lower tepal 2.5–3.5 mm (0.098–0.138 in) long. The stigma is egg-shaped with a small notch and very concave, 1.0–1.2 mm (0.039–0.047 in) long and 0.7–0.8 mm (0.028–0.031 in) wide. Flowering occurs from September to October, and the fruit is broadly elliptic, 4.5–5.5 mm (0.18–0.22 in) long with a narrow neck and hairy.

== Taxonomy ==
Synaphea lesueurensis was first formally described in 1995 by Alex George in the Flora of Australia from specimens he collected on Mount Lesueur in 1974. The specific epithet (lesueurensis) refers to the type location, near where this species occurs.

== Distribution and habitat ==
This species of Synaphea grows in laterite and sandy loam over laterite in kwongan on, and close to Mount Lesueur in the Geraldton Sandplains bioregion of south-western Western Australia.

== Conservation status ==
Synaphea lesueurensis is listed as "Priority Two" by the Government of Western Australia Department of Biodiversity, Conservation and Attractions, meaning that it is poorly known and from one or a few locations.
