= Synaphea odocoileops =

Conservation status
- Priority One — Poorly Known Taxa (DEC)

Scientific classification
- Kingdom: Plantae
- Clade: Tracheophytes
- Clade: Angiosperms
- Clade: Eudicots
- Order: Proteales
- Family: Proteaceae
- Genus: Synaphea
- Species: S. odocoileops

Binomial name
- Synaphea odocoileops A.S.George

Species of Australian shrub

Synaphea odocoileops is a species of flowering plant in the family Proteaceae and is endemic to the south-west of Western Australia. It is a tufted, compact to sprawling shrub with tripartite or pinnatipartite leaves, the end lobes linear, and spikes of openly spaced yellow flowers.

== Description ==
Synaphea odocoileops is a tufted, compact to sprawling shrub that typically grows to a height of 20–59 cm (7.9–23.2 in) with stems up to 20–70 cm (7.9–27.6 in) long and covered with soft hairs. Its leaves are divided, tripartite or pinnatipartite, 60–120 mm (2.4–4.7 in) long and 70–150 mm (2.8–5.9 in) wide, on a petiole 20–90 mm (0.79–3.54 in) long, the end lobes erect, tapering linear, 1–2 mm (0.039–0.079 in) wide and soon become glabrous. The flowers are borne in spikes 30–130 mm (1.2–5.1 in) long on a peduncle up to 150–300 mm (5.9–11.8 in) long, the flowers widely spaced on the spikes. There are more or less glabrous bracts 1 mm (0.039 in) long at the base of the peduncle. The perianth has a more or less widely opening, the upper tepal 3.5–4.0 mm (0.14–0.16 in) long and 1.5 mm (0.059 in) wide, the lower tepal 2.8 mm (0.11 in) long. The stigma is egg-shaped with prominent lobes, 0.8–1.0 mm (0.031–0.039 in) long, 1.2–1.3 mm (0.047–0.051 in) wide with a sparsely hairy ovary. Flowering occurs from August to October and the fruit is oval with a short beak, 4–5 mm (0.16–0.20 in) long and covered with long, soft hairs.

== Taxonomy ==
Synaphea odocoileops was first formally described in 1995 by Alex George in the Flora of Australia from specimens he collected near the Elgin railway siding in 1993. The specific epithet (odocoileops) means 'mule deer-like', alluding to the shape of the leaves.

== Distribution and habitat ==
This species grows in swamps and winter-wet areas in sandy clay in kwongan and is only known from near Byford, Serpentine and Elgin in the south-west of Western Australia.

== Conservation status ==
Synaphea odocoileops is listed as "Priority One" by the Government of Western Australia Department of Biodiversity, Conservation and Attractions, meaning that it is known from only one or a few locations that are potentially at risk.
