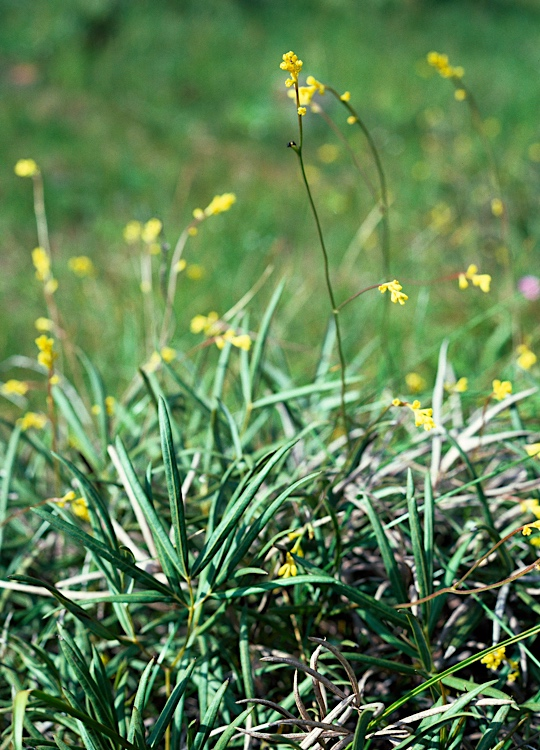

Scientific classification
- Kingdom: Plantae
- Clade: Tracheophytes
- Clade: Angiosperms
- Clade: Eudicots
- Order: Proteales
- Family: Proteaceae
- Genus: Synaphea
- Species: S. pinnata

Binomial name
- Synaphea pinnata Lindl.

= Synaphea pinnata =

Species of Australian shrub

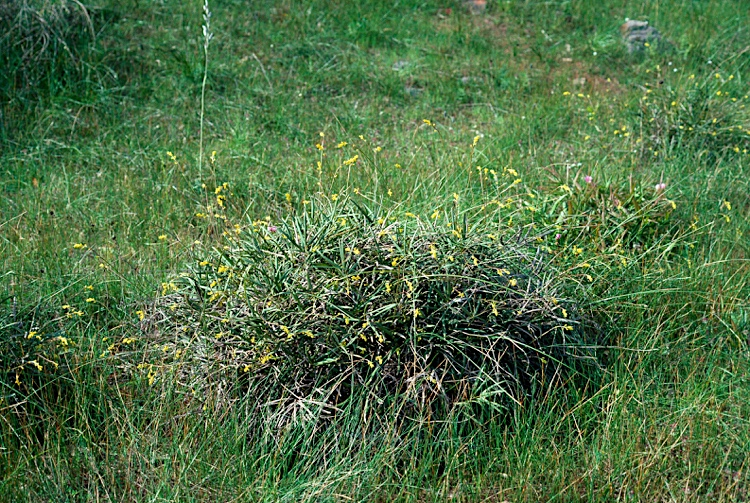
Habit in Martin

Synaphea pinnata, commonly known as Helena synaphea, is a species of flowering plant in the family Proteaceae and is endemic to a small area in the south west of Western Australia. It is a low, open shrub with erect stems, more or less flat, pinnatisect leaves and spikes of openly spaced yellow flowers.

== Description ==
Synaphea pinnata is a low, open shrub that typically grows to a height of 15–50 cm (5.9–19.7 in) and has stems up to 2 cm (0.79 in) long. Its leaves are more or less flat, pinnatisect, usually with up to three lobes from each lobe, 50–110 mm (2.0–4.3 in) long and 4–11 mm (0.16–0.43 in) wide, on a petiole 100–230 mm (3.9–9.1 in) long. The midrib and lateral veins are prominent only on the lower surface. The flowers are yellow and openly spaced on a spike 50–100 mm (2.0–3.9 in) long on a branched peduncle 100–420 mm (3.9–16.5 in) long. The bracts are 4–5 mm (0.16–0.20 in) long and covered with soft hairs pressed against the surface. The perianth is more or less straight, opening widely and glabrous, the upper tepal 7.5 mm (0.30 in) long and 1.4 mm (0.055 in) wide, the lower tepal 7.5 mm (0.30 in) long. The stigma is round and deeply concave, about 0.5 mm (0.020 in) long and wide, and the ovary is covered with soft hairs. Flowering occurs from October to November, and the fruit is elliptic with a curved beak, 5–6 mm (0.20–0.24 in) long and hairy.

== Taxonomy ==
Synaphea pinnata was first formally described in 1839 by John Lindley in his A Sketch of the Vegetation of the Swan River Colony. The specific epithet (pinnata) means 'pinnate'.

== Distribution and habitat ==
Helena synaphea is found in the Darling Scarp and the hills in the eastern suburbs of Perth between John Forrest National Park and Gosnells in the Jarrah Forest and Swan Coastal Plain bioregions of south-western Western Australia, where it grows in sandy-clay-loamy soils over laterite or granite.

== Conservation status ==
Synaphea pinnata is listed as "not threatened" by the Government of Western Australia Department of Biodiversity, Conservation and Attractions
