= Synaphea preissii =

Conservation status
- Priority Three — Poorly Known Taxa (DEC)

Scientific classification
- Kingdom: Plantae
- Clade: Tracheophytes
- Clade: Angiosperms
- Clade: Eudicots
- Order: Proteales
- Family: Proteaceae
- Genus: Synaphea
- Species: S. preissii

Binomial name
- Synaphea preissii Meisn.

Species of Australian shrub

Synaphea preissii is a species of flowering plant in the family Proteaceae and is endemic to the south-west of Western Australia. It is a low, erect shrub with three-lobed leaves, the lobes also three-lobed, the end lobes triangular to lance-shaped, and spikes of widely spaced, yellow flowers.

== Description ==
Synaphea preissii is a low, erect shrub that typically grows to a height of 15–40 cm (5.9–15.7 in) and has stout branches up to 13 cm (5.1 in) long and covered with woolly hairs pressed against the surface. The leaves have three lobes, the lobes also three-lobed, the end lobes triangular to lance-shaped and more or less flat, 30–80 mm (1.2–3.1 in) long and 1.5–4 mm (0.059–0.157 in) wide on a petiole 20–70 mm (0.79–2.76 in) long. The flowers are borne in spikes 20–60 mm (0.79–2.36 in) long, the flowers yellow and widely spaced, on a peduncle 10–40 mm (0.39–1.57 in) long and covered with soft hairs. The perianth opens widely, the upper tepal 6.0–6.5 mm (0.24–0.26 in) long and 2.3 mm (0.091 in) wide, the lower tepal 6 mm (0.24 in) long. The stigma is oblong to narrowly heart-shaped and notched, 1.5–1.6 mm (0.059–0.063 in) long and 1 mm (0.039 in) wide, and the ovary is covered with soft hairs. Flowering occurs in August and September, and the fruit is oval, 5–6 mm (0.20–0.24 in) long and covered with soft hairs.

== Taxonomy ==
Synaphea preissii was first formally described in 1845 by Carl Meissner in Lehmann's Plantae Preissianae of specimens collected by Ludwig Preiss on the sandy slopes of Princess Royal Harbour in 1840. The specific epithet (preissii) honours the collector of the type specimens.

== Distribution and habitat ==
This species of Synaphea is found in the Albany district and near Two Mile Lake in the eastern Stirling Range National Park where it grows in sandy-loamy soils in shrubland and kwongan in the Esperance Plains, Jarrah Forest and Warren bioregions of south-western Western Australia.

== Conservation status ==
Synaphea preissii is listed as "Priority Three" by the Government of Western Australia Department of Biodiversity, Conservation and Attractions, meaning that it is poorly known and known from only a few locations but is not under imminent threat.
