= Synaphea boyaginensis =

Conservation status
- Priority Two — Poorly Known Taxa (DEC)

Scientific classification
- Kingdom: Plantae
- Clade: Tracheophytes
- Clade: Angiosperms
- Clade: Eudicots
- Order: Proteales
- Family: Proteaceae
- Genus: Synaphea
- Species: S. boyaginensis

Binomial name
- Synaphea boyaginensis A.S.George

Species of Australian shrub in the family Proteaceae

Synaphea boyaginensis is a species of flowering plant in the family Proteaceae and is endemic to the south-west of Western Australia. It is a shrub with paripinnate leaves usually with 3 to 7 pairs of lobes, and more or less crowded yellow flowers.

== Description ==
Synaphea boyaginensis is a shrub that typically grows to a height of up to 25 cm (9.8 in) with few branches that have soft hairs pressed against the surface, later glabrous. The leaves are pinnatipartite, 40–100 mm (1.6–3.9 in) long and 100–180 mm (3.9–7.1 in) wide on a petiole 50–150 mm (2.0–5.9 in) long with 3 to 7 pairs of lobes, the lower one or two pairs often with up to five lobes. The end lobes are linear, 2–6 mm (0.079–0.236 in) wide. The flowers are yellow and borne on more or less crowded spikes 30–60 mm (1.2–2.4 in) long, much longer than the leaves, on a peduncle 120–200 mm (4.7–7.9 in) long with spreading, heart-shaped bracts. The perianth is somewhat swollen, opening widely, the upper tepal 5.0–5.5 mm (0.20–0.22 in) long and 2–3 mm (0.079–0.118 in) wide, the lower tepal 4.5 mm (0.18 in) long. Flowering occurs from late September to October.

== Taxonomy ==
Synaphea boyaginensis was first formally described in 1995 by Alex George in the Flora of Australia from specimens he collected in the Boyagin Nature Reserve in 1973. The specific epithet (boyaginensis) means 'native of Boyagin'.

== Distribution and habitat ==
This species of Synaphea is mainly found in the Boyagin Nature Reserve and in the Avon Wheatbelt, Jarrah Forest and Mallee bioregions of south-western Western Australia.

== Conservation status ==
Synaphea boyaginensis is listed as "Priority Two" by the Government of Western Australia Department of Biodiversity, Conservation and Attractions, meaning that it is poorly known and from one or a few locations.
