= Synaphea recurva =

Scientific classification
- Kingdom: Plantae
- Clade: Embryophytes
- Clade: Tracheophytes
- Clade: Spermatophytes
- Clade: Angiosperms
- Clade: Eudicots
- Order: Proteales
- Family: Proteaceae
- Genus: Synaphea
- Species: S. recurva

Binomial name
- Synaphea recurva A.S.George

Species of Australian shrub

Synaphea recurva is a species of flowering plant in the family Proteaceae and is endemic to the north-west of Western Australia. It is a tangled shrub with lobed, pinnatipartite leaves, the lower leaves also lobed, and spikes of yellow flowers.

== Description ==
Synaphea recurva is a tangled shrub that typically grows to a height of 1 m (3 ft 3 in) with branched stems covered with soft or shaggy hairs when young. The leaves are pinnatipartite or three-part, 50–100 mm (2.0–3.9 in) long and 60–120 mm (2.4–4.7 in) wide on a petiole 40–150 mm (1.6–5.9 in) long, the lowest pair of lobes with one or three parts near the end. The end lobes are linear to narrowly triangular, 2–8 mm (0.079–0.315 in) wide. The flowers are yellow and borne in spikes up to 140 mm (5.5 in) long on a crowded, openly branched, glabrous peduncle up to 300 mm (12 in) long. The bracts are egg-shaped and spreading, 1.1–1.6 mm (0.043–0.063 in) long and mostly glabrous. The perianth has narrow opening, opening moderately widely, the upper tepal 6.0–6.5 mm (0.24–0.26 in) long and 2.0–2.5 mm (0.079–0.098 in) wide and strongly curved, the lower tepal 3.5–4.5 mm (0.14–0.18 in) long. The stigma is egg-shaped with the narrower end towards the base and broadly V-shaped, 0.7–1.0 mm (0.028–0.039 in) long and 0.9–1.0 mm (0.035–0.039 in) wide and deeply notched. The ovary is covered with velvety hairs. Flowering occurs from July to September, and the fruit is elliptic, 4–5 mm (0.16–0.20 in) long and covered with soft hairs.

== Taxonomy ==
Synaphea recurva was first formally described in 1995 by Alex George in the Flora of Australia from specimens he found east of Northampton in 1993. The specific epithet (recurva) means 'curved' or 'bent backwards', and refers to the lperianth.

== Distribution and habitat ==
This species of synaphea occurs between Northampton and Yerina Springs where it grows in granite and sandstone in kwongan in the Geraldton Sandplains bioregion of north-western Western Australia.

== Conservation status ==
Synaphea recurva is listed as 'not threatened' by the Government of Western Australia Department of Biodiversity, Conservation and Attractions.
