= Synaphea obtusata =

Scientific classification
- Kingdom: Plantae
- Clade: Embryophytes
- Clade: Tracheophytes
- Clade: Angiosperms
- Clade: Eudicots
- Order: Proteales
- Family: Proteaceae
- Genus: Synaphea
- Species: S. obtusata

Binomial name
- Synaphea obtusata (Meisn.) A.S.George

Synonyms
- Synaphea preissii var. obtusata Meisn.

Species of Australian shrub

Synaphea obtusata is a species of flowering plant in the family Proteaceae and is endemic to the south-west of Western Australia. It is a low, rounded shrub with deeply divided leaves, the end lobes linear, and spikes of yellow flowers, the spikes usually longer than the leaves.

== Description ==
Synaphea obtusata is a low, rounded shrub that typically grows to a height of up to 10–60 cm (3.9–23.6 in) and has several to many stems up to 4 cm (1.6 in) long and covered with soft hairs. Its leaves are deeply divided up to four times, 50–140 mm (2.0–5.5 in) long and 50–120 mm (2.0–4.7 in) wide, on a petiole 40–140 mm (1.6–5.5 in) long, the lobes linear, 1.5–3 mm (0.059–0.118 in) wide. The flowers are borne in spikes 70–140 mm (2.8–5.5 in) long and usually longer than the leaves, on a peduncle up to 30–90 mm (1.2–3.5 in) long, the flowers widely spaced on the spikes. There are broad bracts 20–25 mm (0.79–0.98 in) long at the base of the peduncle. The perianth it has a wide opening, the upper tepal 6–7 mm (0.24–0.28 in) long and 2.5–3.2 mm (0.098–0.126 in) wide, the lower tepal 5.0–5.5 mm (0.20–0.22 in) long. The stigma is egg-shaped to heart-shaped, 1.5–2.0 mm (0.059–0.079 in) long, 1.1–1.2 mm (0.043–0.047 in) wide with an ovary covered with soft hairs. Flowering from July to October and the fruit is 6–9 mm (0.24–0.35 in) long and beaked.

== Taxonomy ==
This taxon was first described in 1856 by Carl Meissner who gave it the name Synaphea preissii var. obtusata from specimens collected in the Swan River Colony by James Drummond. In 1995, Alex George raised the variety to species status as S. obtusata in the Flora of Australia. The specific epithet (obtusata) means 'blunt possessing', referring to the leaf lobes.

== Distribution and habitat ==
Synaphea obtusata grows in sand and gravelly soils in woodland and mallee kwongan in the Avon Wheatbelt, Esperance Plains, Jarrah Forest and Warren bioregions of south-western Western Australia.

== Conservation status ==
Synaphea obtusata is listed as "not threatened" by the Government of Western Australia Department of Biodiversity, Conservation and Attractions.
