= Synaphea pandurata =

Conservation status
- Priority Three — Poorly Known Taxa (DEC)

Scientific classification
- Kingdom: Plantae
- Clade: Tracheophytes
- Clade: Angiosperms
- Clade: Eudicots
- Order: Proteales
- Family: Proteaceae
- Genus: Synaphea
- Species: S. pandurata

Binomial name
- Synaphea pandurata R.Butcher

Species of Australian shrub in the family Ptoteaceae

Synaphea pandurata is a species of flowering plant in the family Proteaceae and is endemic to the south west of Western Australia. It is clumped shrub or subshrub with three-lobed to pinnatipartite leaves, and spikes of yellow, openly spaced flowers.

== Description ==
Synaphea pandurata is a clumped shrub or subshrub with many stems 20–100 mm (0.79–3.94 in) long, its younger stems yellowish-pink to pink-red, the older stems with brown bark. Its leaves are usually three-lobed to pinnatipartite, 50–100 mm (2.0–3.9 in) long and 45–95 mm (1.8–3.7 in) wide, the end lobes linear, 5–15 mm (0.20–0.59 in) wide and 3–11 mm (0.12–0.43 in) wide on a petiole 50–155 mm (2.0–6.1 in) long. The flowers are borne in spikes up to 40–194 mm (1.6–7.6 in) long on a peduncle up to 85–320 mm (3.3–12.6 in) long on a yellowish-green and red rachis with egg-shaped to broadly triangular bracts 1–2.2 mm (0.039–0.087 in) long. The perianth is glabrous horizontal to gently ascending, the upper tepal 4.4–5.6 mm (0.17–0.22 in) long and 2.0–2.8 mm (0.079–0.110 in) wide and strongly curved, the lower tepal more or less flat, 3.0–4.2 mm (0.12–0.17 in) long, 1.25–2.65 mm (0.049–0.104 in) long. The stigma is more or less four-sided, 0.8–1.4 mm (0.031–0.055 in) long, 0.9–1.3 mm (0.035–0.051 in) wide with a mostly glabrous ovary. Flowering has been observed in September and October, and the fruit is cylindrical to oval, 4.3–5.4 mm (0.17–0.21 in) long and 2.3–2.6 mm (0.091–0.102 in) wide, including a golden brown to dark olive green beak.

== Taxonomy ==
Synaphea pandurata was first formally described in 2007 by Ryonen Butcher in the journal Nuytsia from specimens collected in the Beverley Shire, south of the Brookton Highway in 1999. The specific epithet (pandurata) means pandurate referring to the shape of the stigma.

== Distribution and habitat ==
This species of Synaphea occurs in sand and sandy loam in jarrah (Eucalyptus marginata) - marri (Corymbia calophylla) forest on the eastern side of the Darling Range, west and south-west of Brookton in the Jarrah Forest bioregion of south-western Western Australia.

== Conservation status ==
Synaphea pandurata is listed as "Priority Three" by the Government of Western Australia, Department of Biodiversity, Conservation and Attractions, meaning that it is poorly known and known from only a few locations but is not under imminent threat.
