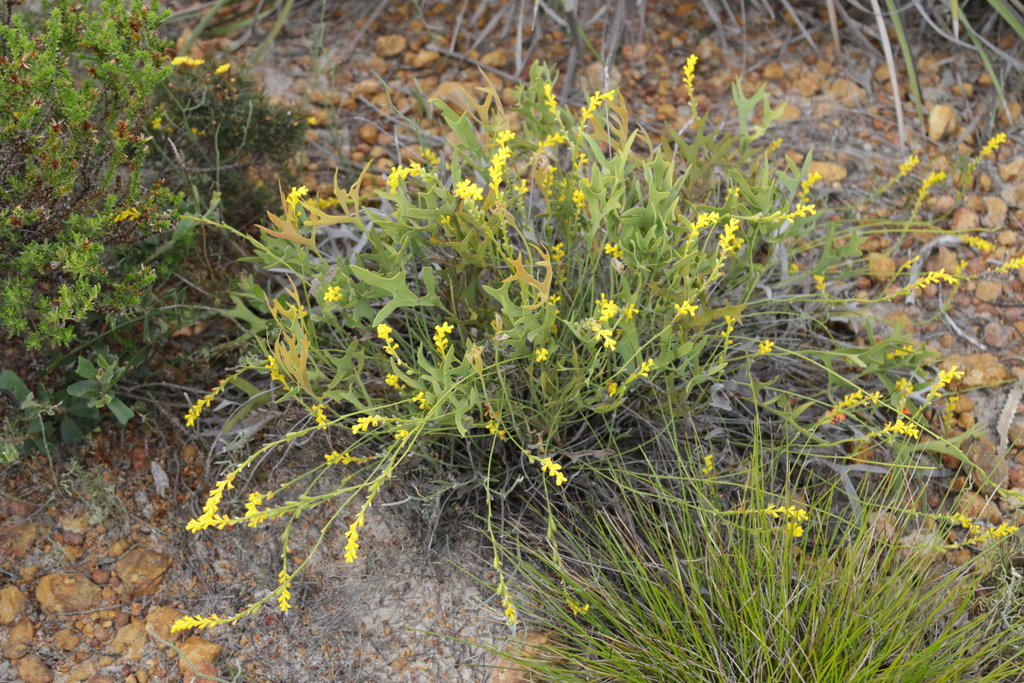
- Near the road to Jurien Bay

Scientific classification
- Kingdom: Plantae
- Clade: Tracheophytes
- Clade: Angiosperms
- Clade: Eudicots
- Order: Proteales
- Family: Proteaceae
- Genus: Synaphea
- Species: S. aephynsa

Binomial name
- Synaphea aephynsa A.S.George

= Synaphea aephynsa =

Species of Australian shrub in the family Proteaceae

Synaphea aephynsa is a flowering plant in the family Proteaceae and is endemic to the south-west of Western Australia. It is an erect, tufted shrub with hairs pressed against the surface, pinnatipartite leaves, spike of crowded yellow flowers, and glabrous, narrowly egg-shaped fruit.

== Description ==
Synaphea aephynsa is an erect, tufted shrub that typically grows to a height of up to 7 cm (2.8 in) and has woolly hairs pressed against the surface. The leaves are pinnatipartite, 50–100 mm (2.0–3.9 in) long and 50–150 mm (2.0–5.9 in) wide on a petiole 40–140 mm (1.6–5.5 in) long, the end lobes lance-shaped, more or less flat and 3–8 mm (0.12–0.31 in) wide. The flowers are borne on spikes 50–120 mm (2.0–4.7 in) long, crowded at first, on a peduncle 100–300 mm (3.9–11.8 in) long. The perianth is hairy inside, the upper tepal 4.5–5.0 mm (0.18–0.20 in) long and 2.0–2.2 mm (0.079–0.087 in) wide, the lower tepal 3.5–4.0 mm (0.14–0.16 in) long. Flowering occurs from July to October, and the fruit is narrowly egg-shaped, about 4 mm (0.16 in) long.

== Taxonomy ==
Synaphea aephynsa was first formally described in 1995 by Alex George in the Flora of Australia from specimens he collected near Eneabba in 1993. The specific epithet (aephynsa) is an anagram of the genus name Synaphea.

== Distribution and habitat ==
This species of Synaphea grows in gravelly laterite and sand over laterite in kwongan from north of Eneabba to Gillingarra in the Geraldton Sandplains, Jarrah Forest and Swan Coastal Plain bioregions of south-western Western Australia.
