= Synaphea xela =

Conservation status
- Priority Two — Poorly Known Taxa (DEC)

Scientific classification
- Kingdom: Plantae
- Clade: Tracheophytes
- Clade: Angiosperms
- Clade: Eudicots
- Order: Proteales
- Family: Proteaceae
- Genus: Synaphea
- Species: S. xela

Binomial name
- Synaphea xela R.Butcher

Species of Australian shrub in the family Proteaceae

Synaphea xela is a shrub endemic to Western Australia.

The sprawling shrub typically grows to a height of 0.4 metres (1 ft).

It is found along the west coast on undulating sites in the Wheatbelt region of Western Australia between Carnamah and Dandaragan where it grows in sandy-clay-loamy soils over laterite.
