= Synaphea cervifolia =

Conservation status
- Priority Two — Poorly Known Taxa (DEC)

Scientific classification
- Kingdom: Plantae
- Clade: Tracheophytes
- Clade: Angiosperms
- Clade: Eudicots
- Order: Proteales
- Family: Proteaceae
- Genus: Synaphea
- Species: S. cervifolia

Binomial name
- Synaphea cervifolia A.S.George

Species of Australian shrub in the family Proteaceae

Synaphea cervifolia is a species of flowering plant in the family Proteaceae and is endemic to the south-west of Western Australia. It is a shrub with widely spreading, bipinnatipartite leaves with sharply pointed lobes, and spikes of moderately crowded yellow flowers.

== Description ==
Synaphea cervifolia is a shrub that typically grows to a height of up to 30 cm (12 in) with several branches covered with silky hairs, but become glabrous as they age. The leaves are flat, 40–80 mm (1.6–3.1 in) long and up to 100 mm (3.9 in) wide and bipinnatipartite meaning deeply lobed, the lobes themselves lobed and giving the impressions of a bipinnate leaf. The leaves are on a petiole 25–50 mm (0.98–1.97 in) long, with widely spreading lobes, the end-lobes linear, tapering, 1.5–2.5 mm (0.059–0.098 in) long, glabrous and prominently sharply pointed. The flowers are yellow and borne in moderately crowded spikes 25–75 mm (0.98–2.95 in) long on a peduncle 10–50 mm (0.39–1.97 in) long with bracts 2.0–2.5 mm (0.079–0.098 in) long and hairy. The perianth has a narrow opening, the upper tepal very convex, 5.0–5.2 mm (0.20–0.20 in) long and 1.5–1.8 mm (0.059–0.071 in) wide, the lower tepal 3.5–3.6 mm (0.14–0.14 in) long. The stigma is oblong to trapezium-shaped, and notched, the ovary covered with soft hairs. Flowering occurs from June to October.

== Taxonomy ==
Synaphea cervifolia was first formally described in 1995 by Alex George in the Flora of Australia from specimens he collected south of Hyden in 1970. The specific epithet (cervifolia) means 'Cervus-leaved', alluding to the antler-like shape of the leaves.

== Distribution and habitat ==
This species of Synaphea grows in sandy clay and gravel in mallee kwongan and south of Hyden in the Mallee bioregion of south-western Western Australia.

== Conservation status ==
Synaphea cervifolia is listed as "Priority Two" by the Government of Western Australia Department of Biodiversity, Conservation and Attractions, meaning that it is poorly known and from one or a few locations.
