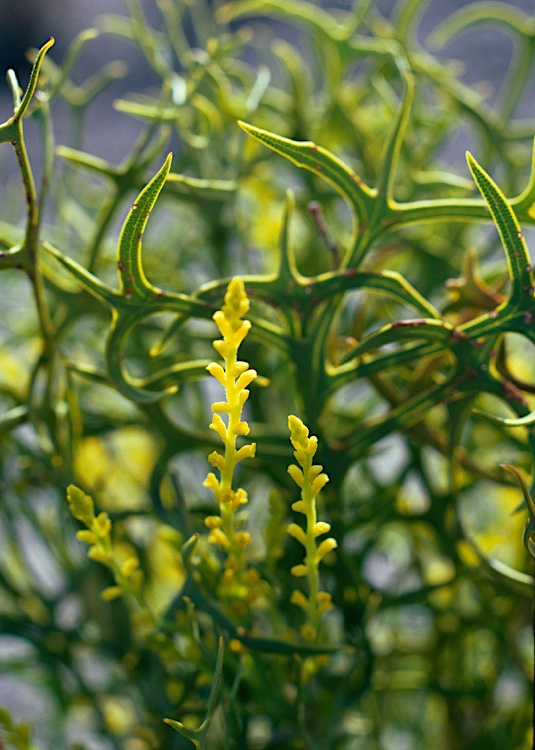

Conservation status
- Priority Two — Poorly Known Taxa (DEC)

Scientific classification
- Kingdom: Plantae
- Clade: Tracheophytes
- Clade: Angiosperms
- Clade: Eudicots
- Order: Proteales
- Family: Proteaceae
- Genus: Synaphea
- Species: S. parviflora

Binomial name
- Synaphea parviflora A.S.George

= Synaphea parviflora =

Species of Australian shrub

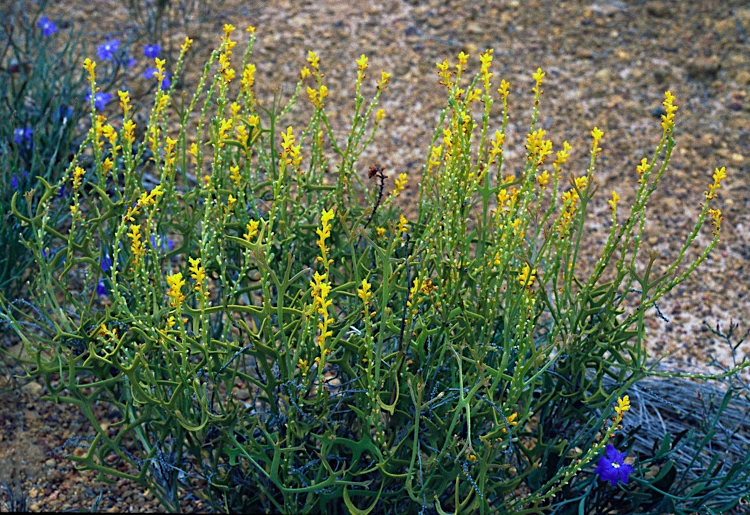
Habit near Lake Grace

Synaphea parviflora is a species of flowering plant in the family Proteaceae and is endemic to the south west of Western Australia. It is a shrub with hairy stems, pinnatipartite leaves, the end lobes thick, linear to triangular, and spikes of moderately crowded yellow flowers.

== Description ==
Synaphea parviflora is a shrub with stems up to 200 mm (7.9 in) long and covered with woolly hairs. The leaves are widely spaced, pinnatipartite, 40–50 mm (1.6–2.0 in) long and 60–90 mm (2.4–3.5 in) wide on a petiole 15–80 mm (0.59–3.15 in) long, the end lobes linear to triangular, 2–5 mm (0.079–0.197 in) wide and thick. The flowers are yellow and moderately crowded, borne in spikes 20–100 mm (0.79–3.94 in) long on a peduncle up to 10–30 mm (0.39–1.18 in) long and covered with woolly hairs. The bracts are 1.0–1.5 mm (0.039–0.059 in) long and hairy. The perianth is ascending with a moderately opening, the upper tepal 4.0–4.2 mm (0.16–0.17 in) long and 1.8 mm (0.071 in) wide and curved, the lower tepal 2.8–3.0 mm (0.11–0.12 in) long. The stigma is oblong with two lobes 0.7 mm (0.028 in) long, 1.0 mm (0.039 in) wide, and the ovary is covered with silky hairs. Flowering occurs from July to October, and the fruit is oval, 5 mm (0.20 in) long, beaked and hairy.

== Taxonomy ==
Synaphea parviflora was first formally described in 1995 by Alex George in the Flora of Australia from specimens collected near Tarin Rock in 1964. The specific epithet (parviflora) means 'small-flowered'.

== Distribution and habitat ==
This species of Synaphea grows kwongan in the Tarin Rock-Lake Grace area.

== Conservation status ==
Synaphea parviflora is listed as "Priority Two" by the Government of Western Australia Department of Biodiversity, Conservation and Attractions, meaning that it is poorly known and from one or a few locations.
