= Synaphea platyphylla =

Conservation status
- Priority Three — Poorly Known Taxa (DEC)

Scientific classification
- Kingdom: Plantae
- Clade: Tracheophytes
- Clade: Angiosperms
- Clade: Eudicots
- Order: Proteales
- Family: Proteaceae
- Genus: Synaphea
- Species: S. platyphylla

Binomial name
- Synaphea platyphylla A.S.George

Species of Australian shrub

Synaphea platyphylla is a species of flowering plant in the family Proteaceae and is endemic to the south west of Western Australia. It is a tufted shrub with many stems, simple or lobed leaves and spikes of yellow flowers.

== Description ==
Synaphea platyphylla is a tufted shrub with many stems up to 120 mm (4.7 in) long. Its leaves are simple, egg-shaped with the narrower end towards the base, 150–220 mm (5.9–8.7 in) long and 20 mm (0.79 in) wide, or sometimes with two or three lobes, then up to 60 mm (2.4 in) wide, narrowing to a petiole 50–80 mm (2.0–3.1 in) long. The flowers are yellow and moderately openly spaced on a spike up to 100 mm (3.9 in) long on a glabrous peduncle up to 300 mm (12 in) long. The bracts are broad, 1.5 mm (0.059 in) long and mostly glabrous. The perianth is ascending, opening widely and glabrous, the upper tepal 5.0–5.5 mm (0.20–0.22 in) long and 2.0–2.2 mm (0.079–0.087 in) wide, the lower tepal 3.2 mm (0.13 in) long. The stigma is more or less square, about 0.8–0.9 mm (0.031–0.035 in) long and wide, and the ovary is covered with soft hairs. Flowering occurs in September and October and the fruit is oval with a beak on the end, 4.5–5.5 mm (0.18–0.22 in) long and hairy.

== Taxonomy ==
Synaphea platyphylla was first formally described in 1995 by Alex George in the Flora of Australia from specimens collected near Dongolocking Nature Reserve in 1994. The specific epithet (platyphylla) means 'flat-, broad- or wide-leaved'.

== Distribution and habitat ==
This species of synaphea is found in the Narrogin area and near Ravensthorpe in the Avon Wheatbelt and Esperance Plains bioregions of southwestern, Western Australia where it grows in sandy loam in tall shrubland.

== Conservation status ==
Synaphea pinnata is listed as "Priority Three" by the Government of Western Australia Department of Biodiversity, Conservation and Attractions, meaning that it is poorly known and known from only a few locations but is not under imminent threat.
