= Synaphea damopsis =

Scientific classification
- Kingdom: Plantae
- Clade: Tracheophytes
- Clade: Angiosperms
- Clade: Eudicots
- Order: Proteales
- Family: Proteaceae
- Genus: Synaphea
- Species: S. damopsis

Binomial name
- Synaphea damopsis A.S.George

Species of Australian shrub in the family Proteaceae

Synaphea damopsis is a species of flowering plant in the family Proteaceae and is endemic to the south-west of Western Australia. It is a tufted, low-lying shrub with fan-shaped leaves, spikes of more or less crowded yellow flowers and elliptic fruit with a short beak on the end.

== Description ==
Synaphea damopsis is a tufted, low-lying shrub that typically grows to a height of up to 10 cm (3.9 in) and is covered with soft, spreading hairs. The leaves are fan-shaped, 50–100 mm (2.0–3.9 in) long and 20–70 mm (0.79–2.76 in) wide on a petiole 40–130 mm (1.6–5.1 in) long with triangular lobes on the end. The flowers are yellow and borne in more or less crowded spikes 20–90 mm (0.79–3.54 in) long on a peduncle up to 120 mm (4.7 in) long with blunt bracts 1.7–2 mm (0.067–0.079 in) long. The perianth has a moderately wide opening, the upper tepal 5.2–5.5 mm (0.20–0.22 in) long and about 2.5 mm (0.098 in) wide and gently curved, the lower tepal 4.0–4.5 mm (0.16–0.18 in) long. The stigma is shaped like a trapezium with the lobes bent back, concave, 0.8–1.1 mm (0.031–0.043 in) long and 1.0–1.5 mm (0.039–0.059 in) wide. Flowering occurs from September to November, and the fruit is elliptic, about 5 mm (0.20 in) long with a beak on the end.

== Taxonomy ==
Synaphea damopsis was first formally described in 1995 by Alex George in the Flora of Australia from specimens he collected about 8 km (5.0 mi) south of Collie in 1973. The specific epithet (damopsis) means 'Dama (fallow deer)-like', referring to lobes on the leaves.

== Distribution and habitat ==
This species of Synaphea grows in lateritic gravel in jarrah forest on the Darling Scarp between Armadale, Dryandra and Collie in the Jarrah Forest and Warren bioregions of south-western Western Australia.

== Conservation status ==
Synaphea damopsis is listed as "not threatened" by the Government of Western Australia Department of Biodiversity, Conservation and Attractions.
