= Synaphea polypodioides =

Conservation status
- Priority Three — Poorly Known Taxa (DEC)

Scientific classification
- Kingdom: Plantae
- Clade: Tracheophytes
- Clade: Angiosperms
- Clade: Eudicots
- Order: Proteales
- Family: Proteaceae
- Genus: Synaphea
- Species: S. polypodioides

Binomial name
- Synaphea polypodioides R.Butcher

Species of Australian shrub in the family Proteaceae

Synaphea polypodioides is a species of flowering plant in the family Proteaceae and is endemic to the south-west of Western Australia. It is a clumped subshrub with simple, three-lobed or pinnatipartite leaves, and openly spaced, yellow flowers.

== Description ==
Synaphea polypodioides is a clumped subshrub that typically grows to a height of 30–40 cm (12–16 in) and 40–80 cm (16–31 in) wide with many stems up to 5–90 mm (0.20–3.54 in) long. The leaves are simple, three-lobed or pinnatipartite, mostly 75–175 mm (3.0–6.9 in) long and 46–165 mm (1.8–6.5 in) wide on a petiole 20–105 mm (0.79–4.13 in) long, the end lobes linear, oblong or lance-shaped with the narrower end towards the base, mostly 26–90 mm (1.0–3.5 in) long and 4–16 mm (0.16–0.63 in) wide. The flowers are yellow and borne on an openly spaced spike 45–250 mm (1.8–9.8 in) long, and shorter or up to three times longer than the leaves, on a peduncle 100–410 mm (3.9–16.1 in) long with triangular to broadly egg-shaped bracts. The perianth is ascending, moderately to widely opening, the upper tepal very strongly curved, 5.6–6.8 mm (0.22–0.27 in) long and 2.6–3.8 mm (0.10–0.15 in) wide, the lower tepal flat to slightly convex, 4.75–5.6 mm (0.187–0.220 in) long and 1.8–2.1 mm (0.071–0.083 in) wide. Flowering occurs in September, October or November, and the fruit is cylindrical to oval, 5.4–5.8 mm (0.21–0.23 in) long and 2.6–3.1 mm (0.10–0.12 in) wide with a slender to broad neck, 0.7–1.5 mm (0.028–0.059 in) long and about 0.7 mm (0.028 in) long.

== Taxonomy ==
Synaphea polypodioides was first formally described in 2007 by Ryonen Butcher in the journal Nuytsia from specimens collected north-north-west of Donnybrook in 1998. The specific epithet (polypodoides) refers to the leaves of this species that resemble to divided leaves of some species of the fern genus Polypodium.

== Distribution and habitat ==
This species of Synaphaea is restricted to the Dardanup - Donnybrook region where it grows in loam, sandy loam and gravelly sandy clay soils in marri-jarrah (Corymbia calophylla - Eucalyptus marginata) open forest and woodland with a shrubby understorey, in the Jarrah Forest and Swan Coastal Plain bioregions of south-western Western Australia.

== Conservation status ==
Synaphea polypodioides is listed as "Priority Three" by the Government of Western Australia Department of Biodiversity, Conservation and Attractions meaning that it is poorly known, and known from only a few locations, but is not under imminent threat.
