= Synaphea nexosa =

Conservation status
- Priority One — Poorly Known Taxa (DEC)

Scientific classification
- Kingdom: Plantae
- Clade: Tracheophytes
- Clade: Angiosperms
- Clade: Eudicots
- Order: Proteales
- Family: Proteaceae
- Genus: Synaphea
- Species: S. nexosa

Binomial name
- Synaphea nexosa A.S.George

Species of Australian shrub in the family Proteaceae

Synaphea nexosa is a species of flowering plant in the family Proteaceae and is endemic to the far south-west of Western Australia. It is a densely tangled shrub with deeply divided leaves, the end lobes triangular, and spikes of yellow flowers, the spikes longer than the leaves.

== Description ==
Synaphea nexosa is a densely tangled shrub that typically grows to a height of up to 1 m (3 ft 3 in) with more or less glabrous stems up to 35 cm (14 in) long. Its leaves are deeply divided, 80–200 mm (3.1–7.9 in) long and wide, on a petiole 130–300 mm (5.1–11.8 in) long, with three linear lobes 3–7 mm (0.12–0.28 in) wide. The flowers are borne in spikes 10–30 cm (3.9–11.8 in) long and longer than the leaves, on a peduncle up to 60 cm (24 in) long, the flowers widely spaced on the spikes. There are more or less glabrous bracts 2 mm (0.079 in) long at the base of the peduncle. The perianth is ascending with a wide opening, the upper tepal 5.5–6.0 mm (0.22–0.24 in) long and 2.2 mm (0.087 in) wide, the lower tepal 4.0 mm (0.16 in) long. The stigma is crescent moon-shaped with prominent horns, 1.4 mm (0.055 in) long, 1.5 mm (0.059 in) wide with an ovary covered with silky hairs in the lower half, glabrous above. Flowering occurs in October and November.

== Taxonomy ==
Synaphea nexosa was first formally described in 1995 by Alex George in the Flora of Australia from specimens he collected near the Scott River in 1993. The specific epithet (nexosa) means 'much intertwined' or 'complicated', referring to the growth habit of this species.

== Distribution and habitat ==
This species grows in winter-wet flats in mixed scrub and is only known from the Scott River plain, east of Augusta in the far south-west of Western Australia.

== Conservation status ==
Synaphea nexosa is listed as "Priority One" by the Government of Western Australia Department of Biodiversity, Conservation and Attractions, meaning that it is known from only one or a few locations that are potentially at risk.
