= Synaphea stenoloba =

Conservation status
- Declared rare (DEC)

Scientific classification
- Kingdom: Plantae
- Clade: Embryophytes
- Clade: Tracheophytes
- Clade: Spermatophytes
- Clade: Angiosperms
- Clade: Eudicots
- Order: Proteales
- Family: Proteaceae
- Genus: Synaphea
- Species: S. stenoloba

Binomial name
- Synaphea stenoloba A.S.George

Species of Australian shrub in the family Proteaceae

Synaphea stenoloba is a species of flowering plant in the family Proteaceae and is only known from a few locations in the south-west of Western Australia. It is a shrub with many hairy stems, tripinnatipartite leaves, the end lobes erect, and spikes much longer than the foliage with crowded, yellow flowers.

== Description ==
Synaphea stenoloba is a tufted shrub that typically grows to a height of 30–45 cm (12–18 in) and has many stems covered with soft hairs. The leaves are tripinnatipartite, 50–180 mm (2.0–7.1 in) long and 29–90 mm (1.1–3.5 in) wide on a petiole 50–270 mm (2.0–10.6 in) long, each lobe divided three times, the end lobes erect, linear, 1–2 mm (0.039–0.079 in) wide. The flowers are yellow and crowded on spikes much longer than the foliage, up to 100–150 mm (3.9–5.9 in) long on a sometimes branched peduncle 100–180 mm (3.9–7.1 in) long. The bracts are egg-shaped, 1.0–1.5 mm (0.039–0.059 in) long and glabrous. The perianth opens more or less widely, the upper tepal 4.5–5.0 mm (0.18–0.20 in) long and 2 mm (0.079 in) wide and the lower tepal about 3.5 mm (0.14 in) long. The stigma is egg-shaped and lobed, 1 mm (0.039 in) long and 1.0–1.2 mm (0.039–0.047 in) wide and the ovary is covered with soft hairs. Flowering occurs in September and October, and the fruit is oval, 6 mm (0.24 in) long and covered with short hairs.

== Taxonomy ==
Synaphea stenoloba was first formally described in 1995 by Alex George in the Flora of Australia from specimens he collected north-east of Pinjarra in 1993. The specific epithet (stenoloba) means 'narrow-lobed', referring to the leaf lobes.

== Distribution and habitat ==
This species of Synaphea is found on winter wet flats with low heath sedgeland and on granite outcrops in several small locations near Pinjarra in the Swan Coastal Plain bioregion of south-western Western Australia.

== Conservation status ==
Synaphea stenoloba is listed as Threatened under the Biodiversity Conservation Act 2016.
