= Synaphea oulopha =

Conservation status
- Priority Three — Poorly Known Taxa (DEC)

Scientific classification
- Kingdom: Plantae
- Clade: Tracheophytes
- Clade: Angiosperms
- Clade: Eudicots
- Order: Proteales
- Family: Proteaceae
- Genus: Synaphea
- Species: S. oulopha

Binomial name
- Synaphea oulopha A.S.George

Species of Australian shrub in the family Ptoteaceae

Synaphea oulopha is a species of flowering plant in the family Proteaceae and is endemic to the south west of Western Australia. It is small, compact shrub with twice or more divided, pinnatipartite leaves and spikes of yellow, openly spaced flowers.

== Description ==
Synaphea oulopha is a compact shrub with several stems 20–50 mm (0.79–1.97 in) long and covered with shaggy hairs. It has twice or more divided, pinnatipartite leaves, 40–60 mm (1.6–2.4 in) long and 4–8 mm (0.16–0.31 in) wide, the end lobes linear, 1.5–2.5 mm (0.059–0.098 in) wide and tapering. The flowers are openly-spaced and borne in spikes up to 150 mm (5.9 in) long on a peduncle up to 150 mm (5.9 in) long on a red rachis with egg-shaped bracts 0.7–0.9 mm (0.028–0.035 in) long and hairy. The perianth is glabrous and ascending with a wide opening, the upper tepal 3–4 mm (0.12–0.16 in) long and 1.5 mm (0.059 in) wide and strongly curved, the lower tepal 2.1–2.3 mm (0.083–0.091 in) long and not curved down. The stigma is oblong, 0.7–0.8 mm (0.028–0.031 in) long, 0.2 mm (0.0079 in) wide with a more or less glabrous ovary. Flowering occurs from June to August, and the fruit is cylindrical 6–7 mm (0.24–0.28 in) long.

== Taxonomy ==
Synaphea oulopha was first formally described in 1995 by Alex George in the Flora of Australia from specimens he collected near Bunney Road, north-north-east of Eneabba in 1993. The specific epithet (oulopha) means 'no crest', referring to the lack of glands on the ovary, present in all other species of Synaphea.

== Distribution and habitat ==
This species of Synaphea occurs near Nannup in the Geraldton Sandplains bioregion in the south-west of Western Australia, where it grows in clay, gravelly loam and gravel on breakaways in low kwongan.

== Conservation status ==
Synaphea otiostigma is listed as "Priority Three" by the Government of Western Australia, Department of Biodiversity, Conservation and Attractions, meaning that it is poorly known and known from only a few locations but is not under imminent threat.
