= Synaphea whicherensis =

Scientific classification
- Kingdom: Plantae
- Clade: Tracheophytes
- Clade: Angiosperms
- Clade: Eudicots
- Order: Proteales
- Family: Proteaceae
- Genus: Synaphea
- Species: S. whicherensis

Binomial name
- Synaphea whicherensis A.S.George

Species of Australian shrub in the family Proteaceae

Synaphea whicherensis is a shrub endemic to Western Australia.

The compact and tufted shrub typically grows to a height of 0.15 to 0.4 metres (0 to 1 ft) and blooms between October and November producing yellow flowers.

It is found on flats and winter wet depressions in the South West region of Western Australia between Capel and Augusta where it grows in gravelly-sandy soils over laterite.
