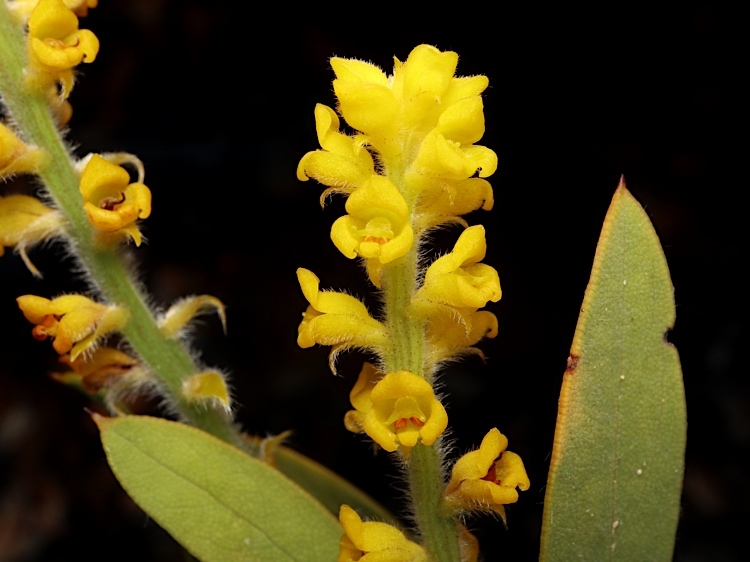

Scientific classification
- Kingdom: Plantae
- Clade: Tracheophytes
- Clade: Angiosperms
- Clade: Eudicots
- Order: Proteales
- Family: Proteaceae
- Genus: Synaphea
- Species: S. floribunda

Binomial name
- Synaphea floribunda A.S.George

= Synaphea floribunda =

Species of Australian shrub in the family Proteaceae

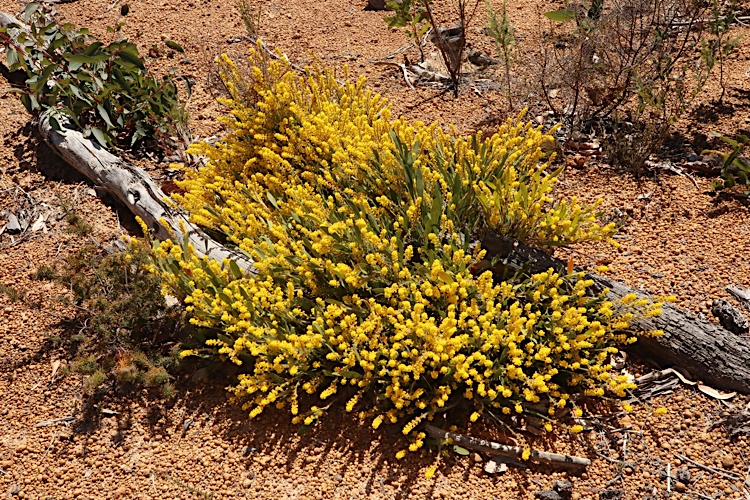
Habit in the Whicher National Park

Synaphea floribunda is a species of flowering plant in the family Proteaceae and is endemic to the south-west of Western Australia. It is a prostrate to ascending shrub with low branches covered with soft hairs at first, lance-shaped, flat leaves with two or three teeth near the tip, spikes of crowded yellow flowers and broadly oval fruit.

== Description ==
Synaphea floribunda is a prostrate to ascending shrub that typically grows to 10–30 cm (3.9–11.8 in) high and up to 1 m (3 ft 3 in) wide, with low-lying stems that are covered with soft hairs at first, later becoming glabrous. The leaves are lance-shaped with the narrower end towards the base, 40–120 mm (1.6–4.7 in) long and 8–18 mm (0.31–0.71 in) wide on a petiole 30–90 mm (1.2–3.5 in) long, the leaves sometimes with two or three teeth near the tip. The flowers are yellow and borne in crowded spikes 20–110 mm (0.79–4.33 in) long on hairy, sometimes branched peduncles 20–150 mm (0.79–5.91 in) long. There are hairy, spreading bracts 3.0–3.5 mm (0.12–0.14 in) long at the base of the peduncles. The perianth opens widely, the upper tepal is 6.0–6.5 mm (0.24–0.26 in) long and 2.5–3.0 mm (0.098–0.118 in) wide, the lower tepal 4.0–4.9 mm (0.16–0.19 in) long. The stigma is crescent moon-shaped with two horns, 1.5–2.0 mm (0.059–0.079 in) long and 1.8–2.0 mm (0.071–0.079 in) wide. Flowering occurs from September to November and the fruit is broadly oval, 3.5 mm (0.14 in) long and covered with soft hairs.

== Taxonomy ==
Synaphea floribunda was first formally described in 1995 by Alex George in the Flora of Australia from specimens he collected near the edge of the Darling Scarp, south-east of Carpel in 1993. The specific epithet (floribunda) means 'flowering profusely'.

== Distribution and habitat ==
This species of Synaphea grows is sandy loam and gravelly sand in woodland and forest and is common between Yallingup and Ludlow and in scattered places to Lake Muir and Kojonup in the Esperance Plains, Jarrah Forest, Swan Coastal Plain and Warren bioregions of south-western Western Australia.

== Conservation status ==
Synaphea flexuosa is listed as "not threatened" by the Government of Western Australia Department of Biodiversity, Conservation and Attractions.
