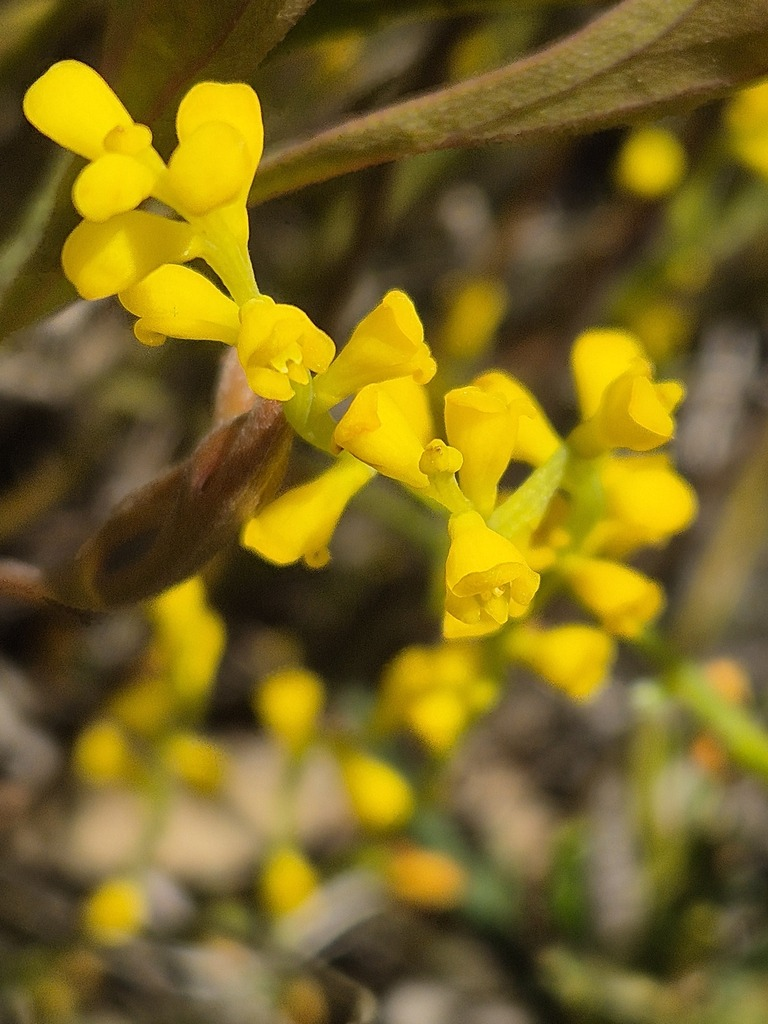

Conservation status
- Priority Three — Poorly Known Taxa (DEC)

Scientific classification
- Kingdom: Plantae
- Clade: Tracheophytes
- Clade: Angiosperms
- Clade: Eudicots
- Order: Proteales
- Family: Proteaceae
- Genus: Synaphea
- Species: S. drummondii

Binomial name
- Synaphea drummondii Meisn.

= Synaphea drummondii =

Species of Australian shrub in the family Proteaceae

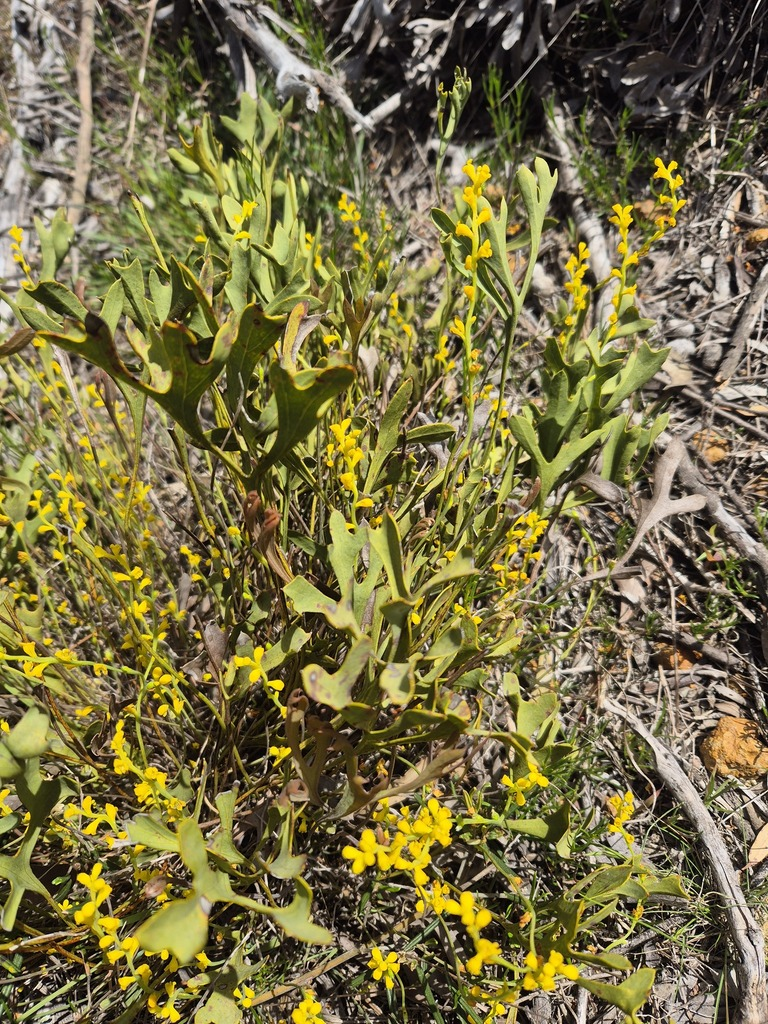
Habit

Synaphea drummondii is a species of flowering plant in the family Proteaceae and is endemic to the south-west of Western Australia. It is a shrub with hairy branchlets, somewhat fan-shaped, wavy, pinnatipartite leaves and spikes of openly spaced yellow flowers.

== Description ==
Synaphea drummondii is a shrub with woolly hairy stems up to 6 cm (2.4 in) long and hairy branchlets. The leaves are fan-shaped, but pinnatipartite, 40–80 mm (1.6–3.1 in) long, 60–100 mm (2.4–3.9 in) wide on a petiole 70–200 mm (2.8–7.9 in) long and twice divided, the end lobes wavy, broadly triangular and 5–10 mm (0.20–0.39 in) wide. The flowers are yellow and borne in rather openly spaced spikes 30–100 mm (1.2–3.9 in) long on a peduncle 70–100 mm (2.8–3.9 in) long. The perianth is ascending with a wide opening, the upper tepal 4.8–5.5 mm (0.19–0.22 in) long and 2.0–2.3 mm (0.079–0.091 in) wide, the lower tepal 3.5–4.2 mm (0.14–0.17 in) long. The stigma is more or less round to egg-shaped, 0.9–1.0 mm (0.035–0.039 in) long and 1.0–1.2 mm (0.039–0.047 in) wide and flat, the ovary covered with silky hairs. Flowering occurs between July and September.

== Taxonomy ==
Synaphea drummondii was first formally published in 1852, but without formal description, by Carl Meissner in Hooker's Journal of Botany and Kew Garden Miscellany from specimens collected in the Swan River Colony by James Drummond.

== Distribution and habitat ==
This species of Synaphea grows in sand over laterite in the Avon Wheatbelt, Esperance Plains and Mallee bioregions of south-western Western Australia.

== Conservation status ==
Synaphea drummondii is listed as "Priority Three" by the Government of Western Australia Department of Biodiversity, Conservation and Attractions, meaning that it is poorly known and known from only a few locations but is not under imminent threat.
