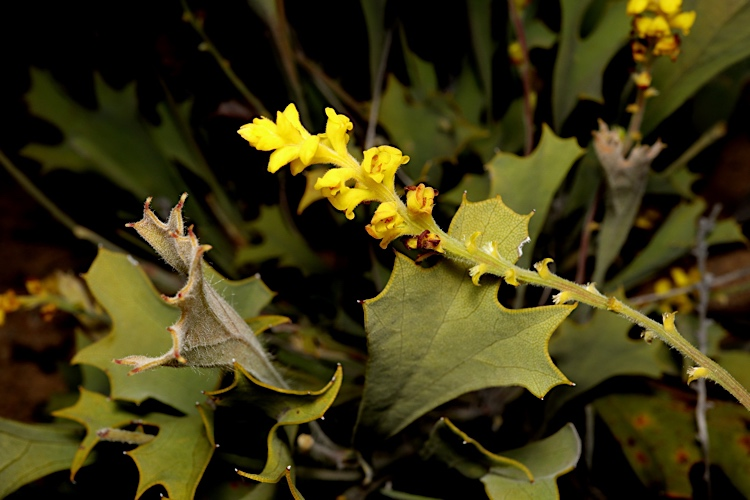

Scientific classification
- Kingdom: Plantae
- Clade: Tracheophytes
- Clade: Angiosperms
- Clade: Eudicots
- Order: Proteales
- Family: Proteaceae
- Genus: Synaphea
- Species: S. flabelliformis

Binomial name
- Synaphea flabelliformis A.S.George

= Synaphea flabelliformis =

Species of Australian shrub in the family Proteaceae

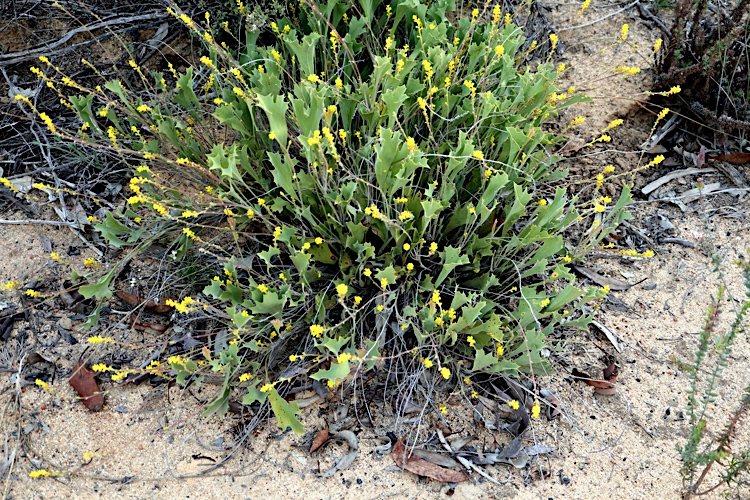
Habit in the Boyagin Nature Reserve

Synaphea flabelliformis is a species of flowering plant in the family Proteaceae and is endemic to the south-west of Western Australia. It is an ascending or low-lying, tufted shrub with fan-shaped leaves and spikes of crowded yellow flowers.

== Description ==
Synaphea flabelliformis is an ascending or low-lying, tufted shrub with stems up to 25 cm (9.8 in) long, sometimes with a few branches, and covered with fine, soft hairs. The leaves are fan-shaped, 50–90 mm (2.0–3.5 in) long and 20–60 mm (0.79–2.36 in) wide with coarse teeth or short lobes, on a petiole 50–140 mm (2.0–5.5 in) long. The flowers are yellow and borne in crowded spikes 60–120 mm (2.4–4.7 in) long on a peduncle up to 150 mm (5.9 in) long. The perianth is moderately open, the upper tepal spoon-shaped, strongly curved and 3.0–3.5 mm (0.12–0.14 in) long and 1.5–1.8 mm (0.059–0.071 in) wide, the lower tepal 2.8–3.0 mm (0.11–0.12 in) long. The stigma is curved, elliptic with a broad notch at the end, 0.6 mm (0.024 in) long and 1.1 mm (0.043 in) wide. Flowering occurs from July to October and the fruit is 4.0–4.7 mm (0.16–0.19 in) long.

== Taxonomy ==
Synaphea flabelliformis was first formally described in 1995 by Alex George in the Flora of Australia from specimens he collected in the Boyagin Nature Reserve in 1971. The specific epithet (flabelliformis) means 'small fan-shaped', referring to the leaves.

== Distribution and habitat ==
This species of Synaphea occurs between Toodyay, Narrogin and the Wickepin area in the Avon Wheatbelt, Esperance Plains and Jarrah Forest bioregions of south-western Western Australia where it grows in sandy-gravelly soils over laterite.

== Conservation status ==
Synaphea flabelliformis is listed as "not threatened" by the Government of Western Australia Department of Parks and Wildlife.
