= Synaphea macrophylla =

Conservation status
- Priority One — Poorly Known Taxa (DEC)

Scientific classification
- Kingdom: Plantae
- Clade: Tracheophytes
- Clade: Angiosperms
- Clade: Eudicots
- Order: Proteales
- Family: Proteaceae
- Genus: Synaphea
- Species: S. macrophylla

Binomial name
- Synaphea macrophylla A.S.George

Species of Australian shrub in the family Proteaceae

Synaphea macrophylla is a species of flowering plant in the family Proteaceae and is endemic to a restricted area in south-west of Western Australia. It is a low-lying shrub covered with soft hairs, fan-shaped, more or less flat or concave, simple or lobed leaves, spikes of moderately crowded yellow flowers, and oval fruit.

== Description ==
Synaphea macrophylla is a low-lying shrub covered with soft hairs and with stems up to 20 cm (7.9 in) long. Its leaves are fan-shaped, more or less flat or concave, simple or with two to five short lobes, 30–180 mm (1.2–7.1 in) long and 30–80 mm (1.2–3.1 in) wide, narrowed gradually to a petiole 60–170 mm (2.4–6.7 in) long. The flowers are borne in moderately crowded spikes up to 70–100 mm (2.8–3.9 in) long on a peduncle up to 300 mm (12 in) long and covered with soft hairs. There are blunt, hairy bracts 1.3–1.8 mm (0.051–0.071 in) long at the base of the peduncle. The perianth is moderately ascending to spreading with a wide opening, the upper tepal 5.5 mm (0.22 in) long and 2 mm (0.079 in) wide, the lower tepal 4 mm (0.16 in) long. The stigma is oblong with two lobes 0.7 mm (0.028 in) long, 1 mm (0.039 in) wide with a hairy ovary. Flowering occurs in October, and the fruit is oval, 5.5–6.0 mm (0.22–0.24 in) long and hairy.

== Taxonomy ==
Synaphea macrophylla was first formally described in 1995 by Alex George in the Flora of Australia from specimens he collected near the Blackwood River on the Brockman Highway in 1993. The specific epithet (macrophylla) means 'long- or 'large-leaved'.

== Distribution and habitat ==
This species of Synaphea grows in gravelly loam between Augusta and Margaret River in the Jarrah Forest and Warren bioregions of south-western Western Australia.

== Conservation status ==
Synaphea macrophylla is listed as is listed as "Priority One" by the Government of Western Australia Department of Biodiversity, Conservation and Attractions, meaning that it is known from only one or a few locations which are potentially at risk.
