= Synaphea divaricata =

Scientific classification
- Kingdom: Plantae
- Clade: Tracheophytes
- Clade: Angiosperms
- Clade: Eudicots
- Order: Proteales
- Family: Proteaceae
- Genus: Synaphea
- Species: S. divaricata

Binomial name
- Synaphea divaricata (Benth.) A.S.George

Species of Australian shrub in the family Proteaceae

Synaphea divaricata is a species of flowering plant in the family Proteaceae and is endemic to the south-west of Western Australia. It is a tufted shrub with hairy stems, pinnatipartite, more or less flat, lobed leaves and spikes of moderately crowded yellow flowers.

== Description ==
Synaphea divaricata is a tufted shrub with stems up to 70 cm (28 in) and covered with silky or shaggy hairs. The leaves are pinnatipartite and more or less flat, with up to three lobes, each with three to five lobes on a petiole 50–160 mm (2.0–6.3 in) long. The flowers are yellow and borne in moderately crowded spikes 10–50 mm (0.39–1.97 in) long on a peduncle 25–120 mm (0.98–4.72 in) long. The perianth has a narrow opening, the upper tepal 4.4–4.8 mm (0.17–0.19 in) long and 1.5–2.0 mm (0.059–0.079 in) wide, the lower tepal about 3.0 mm (0.12 in) long. The stigma is more or less egg-shaped with a shallow notch, thickened on the back, 0.8–0.9 mm (0.031–0.035 in) long and wide. Flowering occurs in August and September.

== Taxonomy ==
This species was first described in 1870 by George Bentham in his Flora Australiensis as Synaphea favosa var. divaricata. In 1995, Alex George raised the variety to species status as Synaphea divaricata in the Flora of Australia. The specific epithet (divaricata) means 'widely spreading' or 'forked'.

== Distribution and habitat ==
Synaphea divaricata grows in sandy soils among quartzite rocks in the Nuytsland Nature Reserve and Frank Hann National Park in the Avon Wheatbelt, Coolgardie, Esperance Plains and Mallee bioregions of south-western Western Australia.

== Conservation status ==
Synaphea decumbens is listed as "not threatened" by the Government of Western Australia, Department of Biodiversity, Conservation and Attractions.
