= Synaphea panhesya =

Conservation status
- Priority One — Poorly Known Taxa (DEC)

Scientific classification
- Kingdom: Plantae
- Clade: Tracheophytes
- Clade: Angiosperms
- Clade: Eudicots
- Order: Proteales
- Family: Proteaceae
- Genus: Synaphea
- Species: S. panhesya

Binomial name
- Synaphea panhesya A.S.George

Species of Australian shrub in the family Ptoteaceae

Synaphea panhesya is a species of flowering plant in the family Proteaceae and is endemic to the south west of Western Australia. It is a shrub with many hairy branches, pinnatipartite leaves, the end lobes more or less triangular, and spikes of more or less crowded yellow flowers.

== Description ==
Synaphea panhesya is an erect shrub with many branches up to 130 mm (5.1 in) long and covered with soft hairs. The leaves are pinnatipartite, 50–90 mm (2.0–3.5 in) long and 50–100 mm (2.0–3.9 in) wide on a petiole 70–200 mm (2.8–7.9 in) long, the end lobes more or less triangular 3–10 mm (0.12–0.39 in) wide and a sometimes sharp point on the end. The flowers are yellow and crowded, borne in spikes 50–100 mm (2.0–3.9 in) long on a branched peduncle up to 300 mm (12 in) long. The bracts are egg-shaped, 1.0–1.5 mm (0.039–0.059 in) long with hairy edges. The perianth is ascending, curved with a more or less wide opening and glabrous the upper tepal 3–4 mm (0.12–0.16 in) long and 1.5 mm (0.059 in) wide and strongly curved, the lower tepal 4.5–5.5 mm (0.18–0.22 in) long and 1.8–2.0 mm (0.071–0.079 in) wide with the edges curved downwards. The stigma is trapezoid-shaped and shallowly notched, 0.7–0.9 mm (0.028–0.035 in) long, 0.9–1.0 mm (0.035–0.039 in) wide and slightly concave, and the ovary is hairy. Flowering occurs from August to September.

== Taxonomy ==
Synaphea panhesya was first formally described in 1995 by Alex George in the Flora of Australia from specimens he collected near the north-west corner of the Bindoon military firing range in 1976. The specific epithet (panhesya) as an anagram of the genus name, Synaphea.

== Distribution and habitat ==
This species of Synaphea grows in gravelly loam and sandy gravel in woodland in the Bindoon-Mogumber area.

== Conservation status ==
Synaphea panhesya is listed as "Priority One" by the Government of Western Australia Department of Biodiversity, Conservation and Attractions, meaning that it is known from only one or a few locations where it is potentially at risk.
