= Synaphea trinacriformis =

Conservation status
- Priority One — Poorly Known Taxa (DEC)

Scientific classification
- Kingdom: Plantae
- Clade: Tracheophytes
- Clade: Angiosperms
- Clade: Eudicots
- Order: Proteales
- Family: Proteaceae
- Genus: Synaphea
- Species: S. trinacriformis

Binomial name
- Synaphea trinacriformis R.Butcher

Species of Australian shrub in the family Proteaceae

Synaphea trinacriformis is a shrub endemic to Western Australia.

The prostrate shrub typically grows to a height of 0.15 to 0.3 metres (0 to 1 ft).

It is found on undulating places and roadsides in small area in the Wheatbelt region of Western Australia near Arthur River where it grows in sandy-loamy soils over laterite.
