= Synaphea tripartita =

Conservation status
- Priority Three — Poorly Known Taxa (DEC)

Scientific classification
- Kingdom: Plantae
- Clade: Tracheophytes
- Clade: Angiosperms
- Clade: Eudicots
- Order: Proteales
- Family: Proteaceae
- Genus: Synaphea
- Species: S. tripartita

Binomial name
- Synaphea tripartita A.S.George

Species of Australian shrub in the family Proteaceae

Synaphea tripartita is a shrub endemic to Western Australia.

The small clumped shrub blooms between July and October producing yellow flowers.

It is found in small area in the Wheatbelt region of Western Australia between Lake Grace and Kulin where it grows in gravelly-clay soils over laterite.
