= Synaphea brachyceras =

Conservation status
- Priority Three — Poorly Known Taxa (DEC)

Scientific classification
- Kingdom: Plantae
- Clade: Tracheophytes
- Clade: Angiosperms
- Clade: Eudicots
- Order: Proteales
- Family: Proteaceae
- Genus: Synaphea
- Species: S. brachyceras

Binomial name
- Synaphea brachyceras R.Butcher

Species of Australian shrub in the family Proteaceae

Synaphea brachyceras is a species of flowering plant in the family Proteaceae and is endemic to the south-west of Western Australia. It is a small, rounded, prostrate shrub with leaves sometimes lance-shaped or three-lobed to pinnatipartite, and moderately crowded yellow flowers.

== Description ==
Synaphea brachyceras is a rounded, prostrate shrub that typically grows to a height of up to 30 cm (12 in) and 20–90 cm (7.9–35.4 in) wide with several stems up to 15 cm (5.9 in) long. The leaves are 110–235 mm (4.3–9.3 in) wide, sometimes lance-shaped with the narrower end towards the base, or three-lobed, or pinnatipartite. The distance from the base of the leaf to the lowest lobe is 60–230 mm (2.4–9.1 in), the lowest lobe 50–65 mm (2.0–2.6 in) long and the end lobe 6–15 mm (0.24–0.59 in) long and 2–6 mm (0.079–0.236 in) wide. The flowers are yellow and borne on a moderately crowded spike 25–150 mm (0.98–5.91 in) long, and shorter or just longer than the leaves, on a peduncle 25–170 mm (0.98–6.69 in) long with egg-shaped bracts. The perianth is gaping, the upper tepal 4.1–5.5 mm (0.16–0.22 in) long and 1.7–2.4 mm (0.067–0.094 in) wide, the lower tepal 2.5–3.7 mm (0.098–0.146 in) long. Flowering occurs from August to October and the fruit is elliptic, covered with soft hairs, about 4.5 mm (0.18 in) long with a top-shaped seed, about 2.2 mm (0.087 in) long.

== Taxonomy ==
Synaphea brachyceras was first formally described in 2000 by Ryonen Butcher in the journal Nuytsia from specimens collected north-west of the Arthur River in 1998. The specific epithet (brachyceras) means 'short horn', referring to a projection on the back of the stugma.

== Distribution and habitat ==
This species of Synaphea grows in clayey sand and sandy gravel on flats and slight slopes in shrubby woodland in the Arthur River - Highbury area in the Avon Wheatbelt and Jarrah Forest bioregions of south-western Western Australia.

== Conservation status ==
Synaphea brachyceras is listed as "Priority Three" by the Government of Western Australia Department of Biodiversity, Conservation and Attractions, meaning that it is poorly known and known from only a few locations but is not under imminent threat.
