= Synaphea interioris =

Scientific classification
- Kingdom: Plantae
- Clade: Tracheophytes
- Clade: Angiosperms
- Clade: Eudicots
- Order: Proteales
- Family: Proteaceae
- Genus: Synaphea
- Species: S. interioris

Binomial name
- Synaphea interioris A.S.George

Species of Australian shrub in the family Proteaceae

Synaphea interioris is a species of flowering plant in the family Proteaceae and is endemic to the south-west of Western Australia. It is a tufted shrub with woolly hairs, pinnatipartite, lobed leaves, spikes of moderately crowded yellow flowers and oval fruit.

== Description ==
Synaphea interioris is a tufted shrub up to 100 cm (39 in) long and covered with woolly hairs pressed against the surface. The leaves are pinnatipartite, 70–110 mm (2.8–4.3 in) long, 70–160 mm (2.8–6.3 in) wide on a petiole 40–120 mm (1.6–4.7 in) long, and more or less multiplanar. The lowest 2 pairs of lobes also usually pinnatipartite, the end lobes linear to lance-shaped, 2.5–10 mm (0.098–0.394 in) long, usually curved, flat and sharply pointed. The flowers are yellow and borne in moderately crowded spikes 50–140 mm (2.0–5.5 in) long on a peduncle up to 120 mm (4.7 in) long, mostly shorter than the foliage. There are broadly egg-shaped bracts 1.3–2 mm (0.051–0.079 in) long at the base of the peduncles. The perianth opens moderately widely, the upper tepal 5–6 mm (0.20–0.24 in) long and 1.5–2 mm (0.059–0.079 in) wide, the lower tepal 3.5–4.0 mm (0.14–0.16 in) long. The stigma is oblong to more or less square, notched and slightly flared at the base, 0.8–1 mm (0.031–0.039 in) long and 0.7–1 mm (0.028–0.039 in) wide. Flowering occurs from August to October and the fruit is oval, 3.5–4.0 mm (0.14–0.16 in) long with a short, blunt beak and hairy.

== Taxonomy ==
Synaphea interioris was first formally described in 1995 by Alex George in the Flora of Australia from specimens collected near Kokardine. The specific epithet (interioris) means 'interior', that is, 'found in inland districts".

== Distribution and habitat ==
This species of Synaphea grows in sandy loam and gravelly sand and is widespread from Wubin to Frank Hann National Park in the Avon Wheatbelt, Coolgardie, Esperance Plains, Jarrah Forest and Mallee bioregions in the south-west of Western Australia.

== Conservation status ==
Synaphea incurva is listed as "not threatened" by the Government of Western Australia Department of Biodiversity, Conservation and Attractions.
