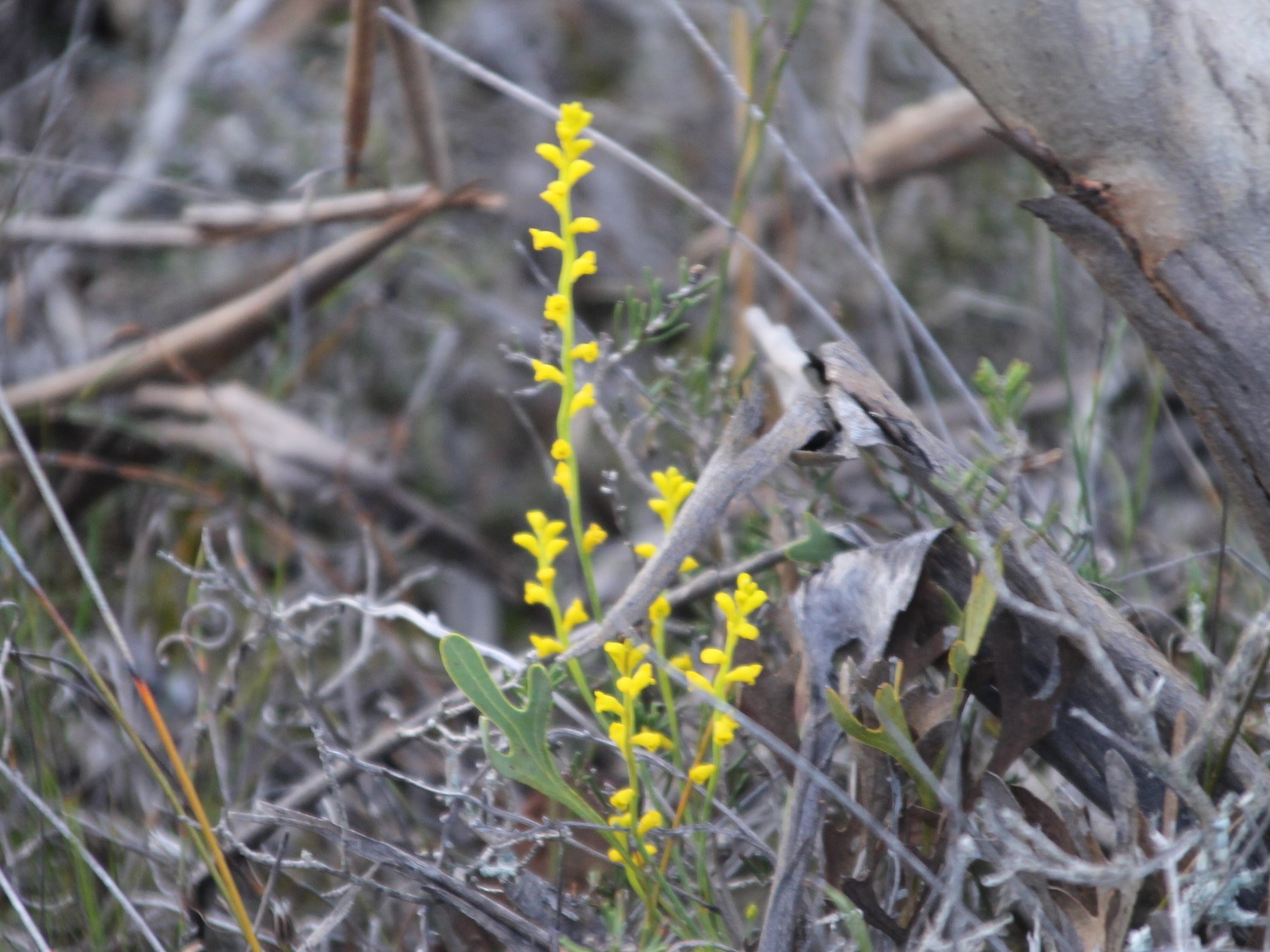

Conservation status
- Priority One — Poorly Known Taxa (DEC)

Scientific classification
- Kingdom: Plantae
- Clade: Tracheophytes
- Clade: Angiosperms
- Clade: Eudicots
- Order: Proteales
- Family: Proteaceae
- Genus: Synaphea
- Species: S. media

Binomial name
- Synaphea media A.S.George

= Synaphea media =

Species of Australian shrub

Synaphea media is a species of flowering plant in the family Proteaceae and is endemic to the south of Western Australia. It is an erect, multi-stemmed shrub with three-part leaves, the lobes also three-part, the end lobes triangular to lance-shaped, spikes of moderately crowded yellow flowers, and oval fruit.

== Description ==
Synaphea media is an erect, multi-stemmed shrub covered with soft hairs at first, later glabrous, and with stems up to 35 cm (14 in) long. Its leaves are three-part, 30–50 mm (1.2–2.0 in) long and 70–90 mm (2.8–3.5 in) wide, on a petiole 15–40 mm (0.59–1.57 in) long, the lobes also three part, the end lobes triangular to lance-shaped, 3–5 mm (0.12–0.20 in) wide. The flowers are borne in moderately crowded spikes up to 20–50 mm (0.79–1.97 in) long on a peduncle up to 35 mm (1.4 in) long and covered with soft hairs pressed against the surface. There are egg-shaped, hairy bracts 1.5–2.5 mm (0.059–0.098 in) long at the base of the peduncle. The perianth has a wide opening, the upper tepal 5.5–5.7 mm (0.22–0.22 in) long and 2.0–2.3 mm (0.079–0.091 in) wide, the lower tepal 4.5–5.0 mm (0.18–0.20 in) long. The stigma is oblong, slightly constricted and shallowly notched, concave, 0.8–1 mm (0.031–0.039 in) long, 0.7–1 mm (0.028–0.039 in) wide with a hairy ovary. Flowering occurs from August to October, and the fruit is oval, about 5.0 mm (0.20 in) long and hairy.

== Taxonomy ==
Synaphea media was first formally described in 1995 by Alex George in the Flora of Australia from specimens collected near Horwick Hill by Anthony Orchard in 1968. The specific epithet (media) means 'intermediate' between two other species.

== Distribution and habitat ==
This species grows in sand in kwongan between Cheyne Beach and Howick Hill (east of Esperance) and in the Stirling Range in the Avon Wheatbelt, Esperance Plains and Jarrah Forest bioregions in the south of Western Australia.
