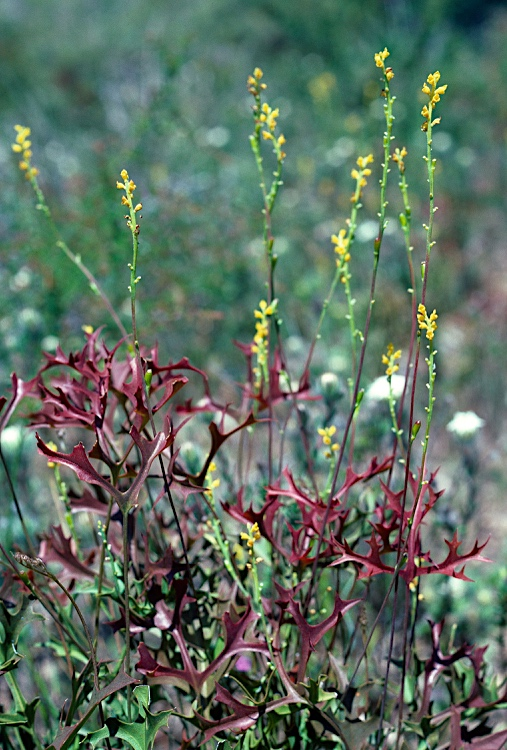
- On Gooseberry Hill

Scientific classification
- Kingdom: Plantae
- Clade: Tracheophytes
- Clade: Angiosperms
- Clade: Eudicots
- Order: Proteales
- Family: Proteaceae
- Genus: Synaphea
- Species: S. acutiloba

Binomial name
- Synaphea acutiloba Meisn.

= Synaphea acutiloba =

Species of Australian shrub in the family Proteaceae

Synaphea acutiloba, commonly known as granite synaphea, is a flowering plant in the family Proteaceae and is endemic to Western Australia. It is a shrub with many stems with very wavy, pinnatipartite leaves, spike of yellow flowers much longer than the foliage, and glabrous, more or less cylindrical fruit.

== Description ==
Synaphea acutiloba is an erect, tufted shrub that typically grows to a height of 0.3–1 m (1 ft 0 in – 3 ft 3 in) and has many stems up to 28 cm (11 in) long with few branches covered with soft hairs at first, later becoming glabrous. The leaves are pinnatipartite 30–70 mm (1.2–2.8 in) long, 40–80 mm (1.6–3.1 in) wide and very wavy, on a petiole 50–200 mm (2.0–7.9 in) long. The lowest lobes of the leaves have two or three lobes, the end lobes triangular, 2–4 mm (0.079–0.157 in) long with two to three sharply pointed lobes with the edges rolled under. The flowers are borne in crowded spikes 150 mm (5.9 in) long and much longer than the leaves, on a branched peduncle up to 350 mm (14 in) long. The flowers are yellow, 4.5–5.0 mm (0.18–0.20 in) long, the upper tepals 3.5–4.0 mm (0.14–0.16 in) long and 1.5–1.8 mm (0.059–0.071 in) wide, the lower tepals 2.3–2.5 mm (0.091–0.098 in) long. The stigma is 0.7–0.8 mm (0.028–0.031 in) long and wide, more or less flat and the lower half of the ovary is hairy. The fruit is more or less cylindrical and glabrous, 5–6 mm (0.20–0.24 in) long.

== Taxonomy ==
Synaphea acutiloba was first formally described in 1845 by Carl Meissner in Lehmann's Plantae Preissianae from specimens collected by James Drummond. The specific epithet (acutiloba) means 'sharp-pointed lobes'.

== Distribution and habitat ==
Granite synaphea grows in granitic and lateritic soils in kwongan and woodland along and just east of the Darling Scarp near Perth in the Jarrah Forest and Swan Coastal Plain bioregions of south-western Western Australia.

== Conservation status ==
Synaphea acutiloba is listed as "not threatened" by the Government of Western Australia Department of Biodiversity, Conservation and Attractions.
