= Synaphea otiostigma =

Conservation status
- Priority Three — Poorly Known Taxa (DEC)

Scientific classification
- Kingdom: Plantae
- Clade: Tracheophytes
- Clade: Angiosperms
- Clade: Eudicots
- Order: Proteales
- Family: Proteaceae
- Genus: Synaphea
- Species: S. otiostigma

Binomial name
- Synaphea otiostigma A.S.George

Species of Australian shrub in the family Ptoteaceae

Synaphea otiostigma is a species of flowering plant in the family Proteaceae and is endemic to the south west of Western Australia. It is small, erect to low-lying shrub with pinnatipartite, more or less wedge-shaped leaves and spikes of yellow, openly spaced flowers.

== Description ==
Synaphea otiostigma is a small, erect to low-lying shrub with stems up to 50 cm (20 in) long and covered with long, soft hairs. Its leaves are more or less wedge-shaped, but three-lobed or pinnatipartite, flat to wavy, the primary lobes with two or three lobes, sometimes with further small lobes or teeth, 40–90 mm (1.6–3.5 in) long, 30–80 mm (1.2–3.1 in) wide on a petiole 50–160 mm (2.0–6.3 in) long. The flowers are borne in spikes up to 20 cm (7.9 in) long, rather openly spaced, on a branched peduncle up to 25 cm (9.8 in) long. There are broadly heart-shaped bracts 1.5–2.0 mm (0.059–0.079 in) long at the base of the peduncle. The perianth is ascending with a wide opening, the upper tepal 5–6 mm (0.20–0.24 in) long and 1.9–2.0 mm (0.075–0.079 in) wide and strongly curved, the lower tepal 4.0 mm (0.16 in) long. The stigma broadly crescent moon-shaped, 0.8–1.0 mm (0.031–0.039 in) long, 1.0–1.1 mm (0.039–0.043 in) wide with an ovary covered with soft hairs. Flowering occurs in October and November and the fruit is oval with a short beak, 5 mm (0.20 in) long with shaggy hairs.

== Taxonomy ==
Synaphea otiostigma was first formally described in 1995 by Alex George in the Flora of Australia from specimens he collected 9 km (5.6 mi) south of Nannup on the Pemberton Road in 1993. The specific epithet (otiostigma) means 'little-eared stigma', referring to the lobes of the stigma.

== Distribution and habitat ==
This species of Synaphea occurs near Nannup in the Jarrah Forest and Warren bioregions in the south-west of Western Australia, where it grows in clayey laterite, gravelly loam and sand.

== Conservation status ==
Synaphea otiostigma is listed as "Priority Three" by the Government of Western Australia, Department of Biodiversity, Conservation and Attractions, meaning that it is poorly known and known from only a few locations but is not under imminent threat.
