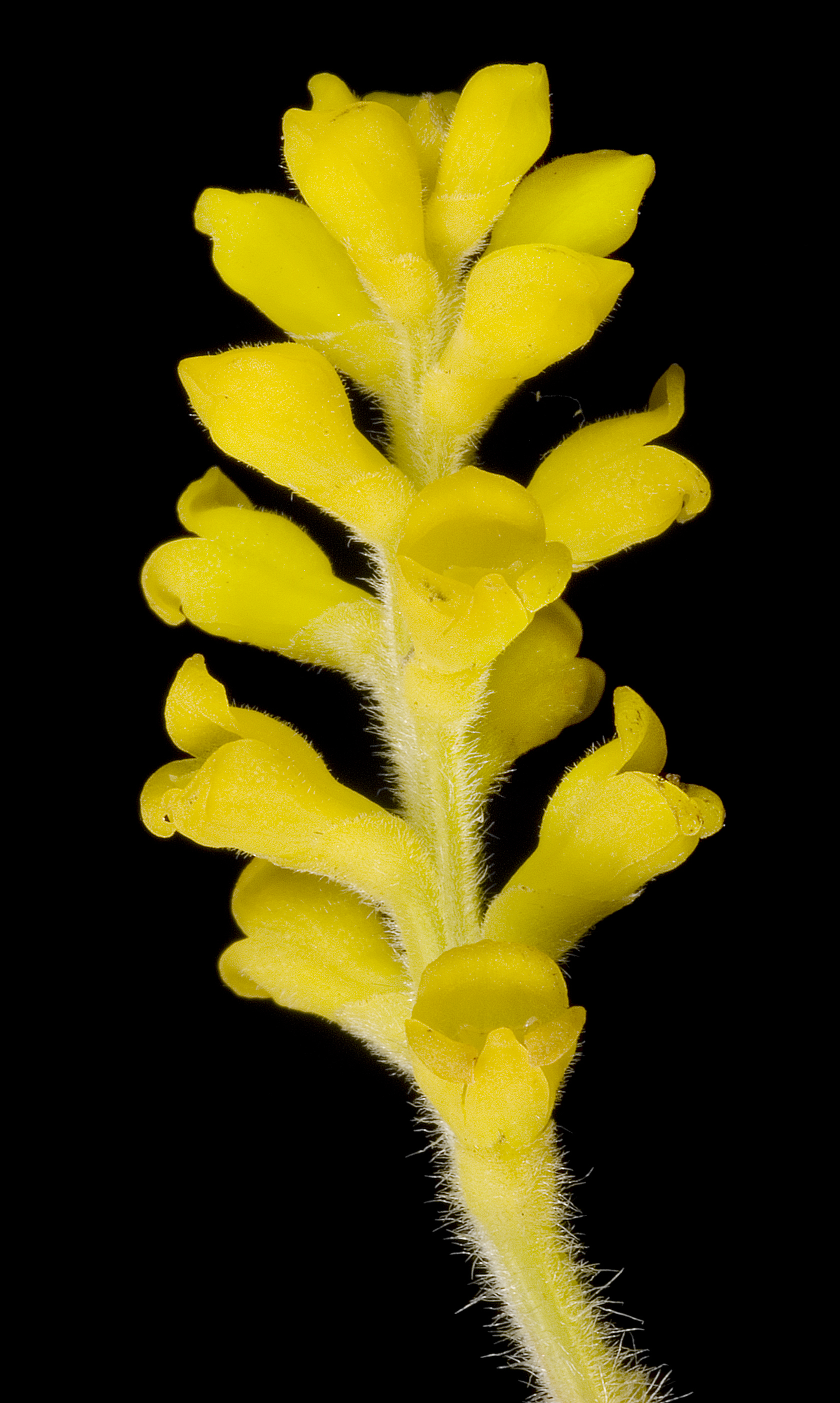

Scientific classification
- Kingdom: Plantae
- Clade: Tracheophytes
- Clade: Angiosperms
- Clade: Eudicots
- Order: Proteales
- Family: Proteaceae
- Genus: Synaphea
- Species: S. cuneata

Binomial name
- Synaphea cuneata A.S.George

= Synaphea cuneata =

Species of Australian shrub in the family Proteaceae

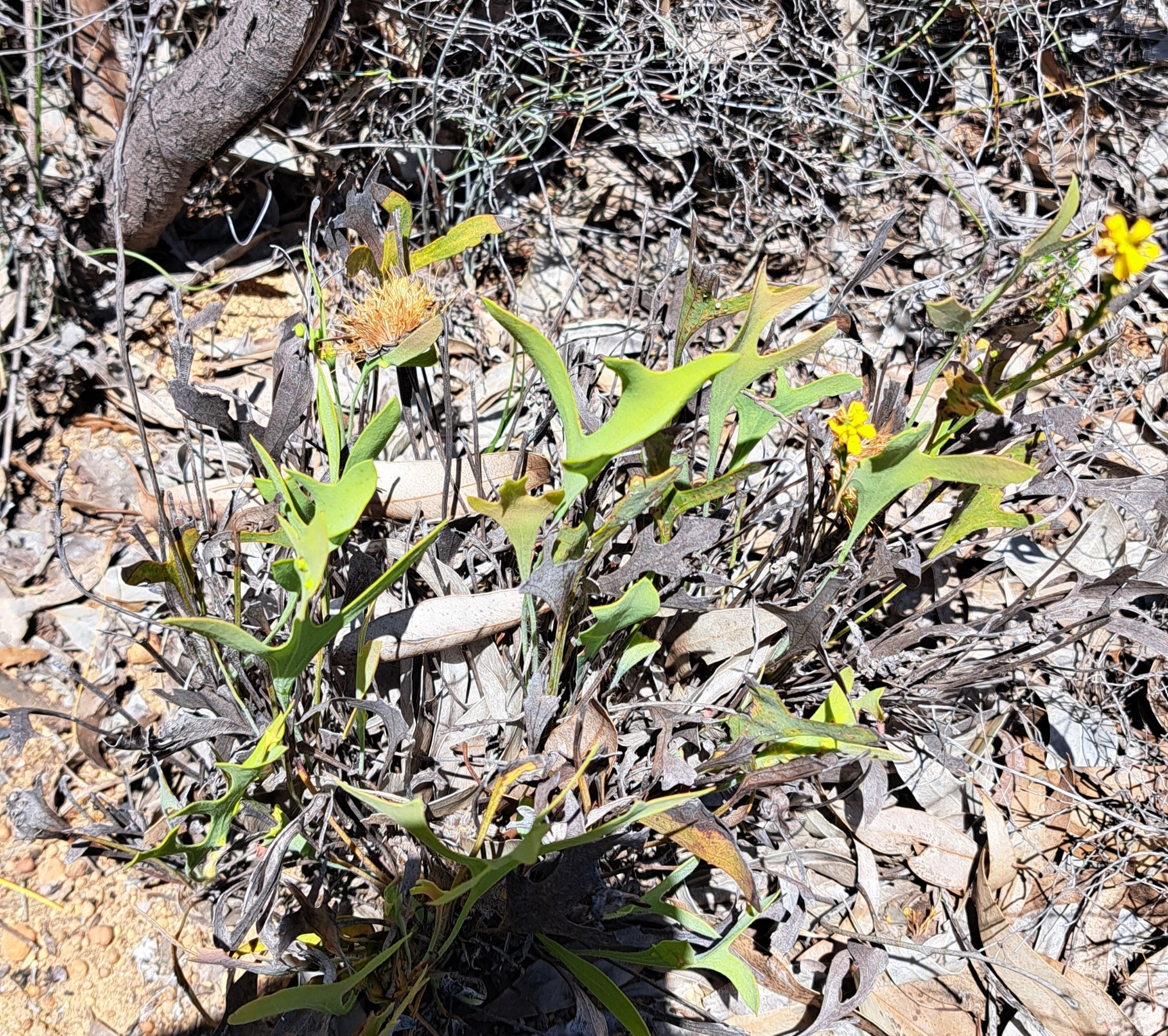
Habit near Williams

Synaphea cuneata is a species of flowering plant in the family Proteaceae and is endemic to the south-west of Western Australia. It is a low-lying or ascending shrub with wedge-shaped leaves, spikes of moderately crowded yellow flowers and elliptic to egg-shaped fruit.

== Description ==
Synaphea cuneata is a low-lying or ascending shrub that typically grows to a height of up to 20 cm (7.9 in) and has few branches covered with soft, velvety hairs. The leaves are wedge-shaped, 40–150 mm (1.6–5.9 in) long and up to 15–75 mm (0.59–2.95 in) wide on a petiole 30–120 mm (1.2–4.7 in) long with blunt teeth on the edges with sparse, soft hairs. The flowers are yellow and borne in moderately crowded spikes 20–120 mm (0.79–4.72 in) long on a peduncle 180 mm (7.1 in) long with egg-shaped bracts . The perianth has a wide opening, the upper tepal about 6 mm (0.24 in) long and 3.0–3.4 mm (0.12–0.13 in) wide and gently convex, the lower tepal 4.2–4.5 mm (0.17–0.18 in) long. The stigma is elliptic, convex with spreading horns. Flowering occurs in September and October, and the fruit is elliptic to egg-shaped, about 4.5 mm (0.18 in) long and sparsely hairy.

== Taxonomy ==
Synaphea cuneata was first formally described in 1995 by Alex George in the Flora of Australia from specimens collected 7 km (4.3 mi) south of Bannister in 1993. The specific epithet (cuneata) means 'wedge-shaped', referring to the leaves.

== Distribution and habitat ==
This species of Synaphea grows in lateritic soil in jarrah forest and sandy loam in wandoo woodland on the Darling Scarp between York and Bannister in the Avon Wheatbelt and Jarrah Forest bioregions of south-western Western Australia.

== Conservation status ==
Synaphea cuneata is listed as "not threatened" by the Government of Western Australia Department of Biodiversity, Conservation and Attractions.
