= Blackbutt =

Blackbutt may refer to:

== Plants ==
Blackbutt is a common name for Australian tree or mallee species:

- Eucalyptus
  - Blackbutt, Eucalyptus patens. Southwestern Australia
  - Blackbutt, Eucalyptus pilularis. Southeastern Australia
  - Blackbutt and coastal blackbutt, Eucalyptus todtiana. Southwest
  - Blackbutt candlebark, Eucalyptus rubida subsp. barbigerorum. Southeast
  - Blackbutt mallee, Eucalyptus zopherophloia. Southwest
  - Blackbutt peppermint, Eucalyptus smithii. Southeast
  - Carne's blackbutt, Eucalyptus carnei. Midwest Australia
  - Cleland's blackbutt, Eucalyptus clelandii. Midwest
  - Dawson River blackbutt, Eucalyptus cambageana. Southeast
  - Dundas blackbutt, Eucalyptus dundasii. Midwest
  - Fraser Range blackbutt, Eucalyptus fraseri subsp. melanobasis. Fraser Range W.A.
  - Goldfields' blackbutt, Eucalyptus lesouefii. Midwest
  - Kondinin blackbutt, Eucalyptus kondininensis. Kondinin, W.A.
  - Large-fruited blackbutt, Eucalyptus pyrocarpa. New South Wales
  - New England blackbutt, Eucalyptus andrewsii subsp. andrewsii and Eucalyptus andrewsii subsp. campanulata [or synonyms Eucalyptus andrewsii and Eucalyptus campanulata]. N.S.W., Queensland

== Places ==
- Blackbutt, New South Wales, Australia, a suburb of Wollongong
- Blackbutt, Queensland, Australia, a town in the South Burnett Region
- Blackbutt South, Queensland, Australia, a rural locality in the South Burnett Region
