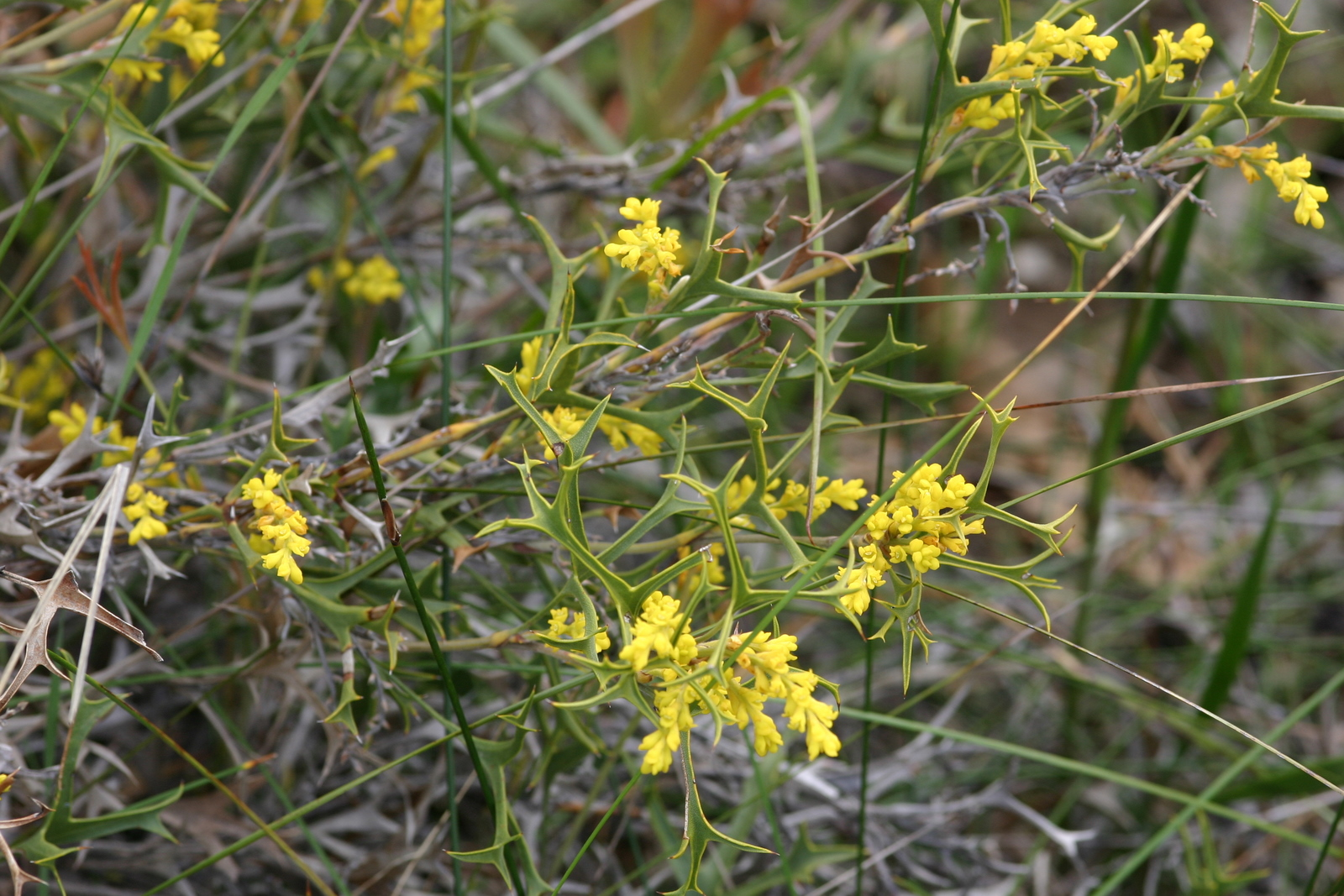
- Subspecies spinulosa

Conservation status
- Least Concern (IUCN 3.1)

Scientific classification
- Kingdom: Plantae
- Clade: Embryophytes
- Clade: Tracheophytes
- Clade: Spermatophytes
- Clade: Angiosperms
- Clade: Eudicots
- Order: Proteales
- Family: Proteaceae
- Genus: Synaphea
- Species: S. spinulosa

Binomial name
- Synaphea spinulosa (Burm.f.) Merr.

= Synaphea spinulosa =

Species of plant endemic to Western Australia

Synaphea spinulosa is a species of small shrub in the flowering plant family Proteaceae. It is endemic to Western Australia. Along with Acacia truncata, it was the first Australian endemic to be scientifically described and named. The specimen on which this description is based is the oldest extant specimen of an Australian plant and is very likely among the first Australian plant specimens ever collected.

== Description ==
Synaphea spinulosa grows as a small shrub with several stems up to 50 cm (20 in) long and covered with soft hairs. The leaves are deeply divided into three lobes 20–70 mm (0.79–2.76 in) long on a petiole usually 5–20 mm (0.20–0.79 in) long, each lobe usually also divided into three. The ultimate lobes are usually triangular, 1.5–5 mm (0.059–0.197 in) wide with up to three sharply pointed teeth. The flowers are bright yellow, and borne in more or less crowded spikes 20–50 mm (0.79–1.97 in) long in upper leaf axils on a usually branched peduncle 10–30 mm (0.39–1.18 in) long with egg-shaped bracts 15–45 mm (0.59–1.77 in) long. The perianth usually has a narrow opening, covered with soft hairs, the upper tepal 4.4–7 mm (0.17–0.28 in) long and 1.4–3 mm (0.055–0.118 in) wide, the lower tepal 3.5–5.5 mm (0.14–0.22 in) long. The stigma is more or less b roadly egg-shaped to elliptic and shallowly notched, 0.7–1.0 mm (0.028–0.039 in) long and wide and the ovary is hairy. The fruit is elliptical to cylindrical, prominently beaked, 3.5–5 mm (0.14–0.20 in) long and hairy.

== Taxonomy ==
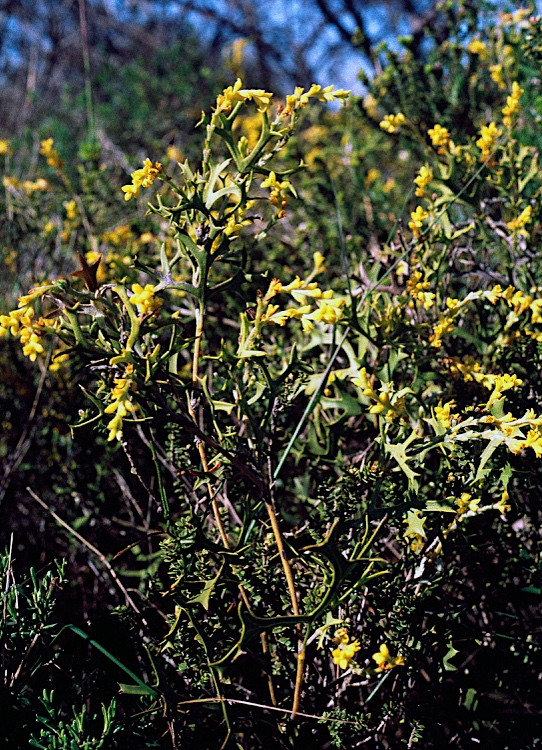
Subspecies borealis

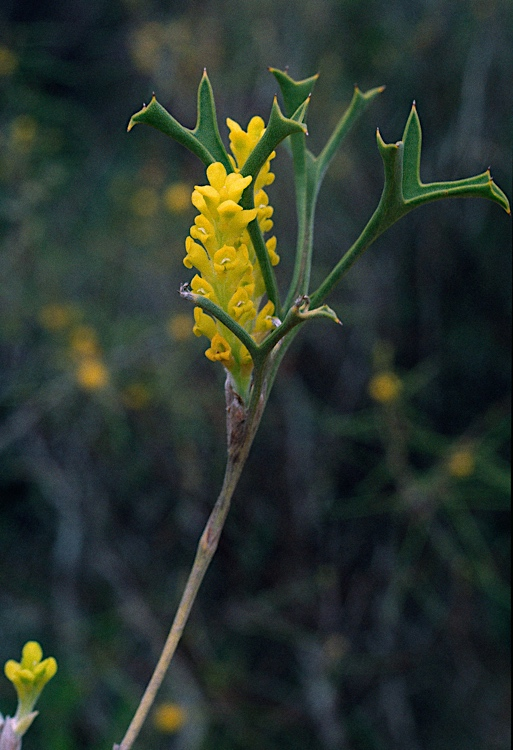
Subspecies major

=== Taxonomic history ===
Synaphea spinulosa bears the distinction of holding several 'firsts' in Australia botanical history. Together with Acacia truncata it was the first Australian endemic to be scientifically described and named, and the specimen upon which that description is based is the oldest extant specimen of an Australian plant, and very likely among the first Australian plant specimens ever collected.

Nothing is known of the original collection of the specimen, except that it was necessarily collected before publication of the species description in 1768. Prior to this, the only known visit by Europeans to an area where S. spinulosa occurs was the voyage of Dutch mariner Willem de Vlamingh, who explored Rottnest Island and the Swan River in December 1696 and January 1697 respectively. It is therefore very likely, but not proven, that the specimen was collected during that voyage, and thus predates by nearly three years the oldest authenticated collection of Australian plants, that made by William Dampier in 1699. It is known that Dutch botanist Nicolaas Witsen asked Vlamingh to collect plants for him during the voyage, and it is recorded that Vlamingh returned to Holland with plants, fruits, and wood samples. However, according to Mabberley, at least one of the two specimens came from Christiaan Kleijnhoff who had established a botanic garden in Java (which is where Burman describes S. spinulosa as coming from - "ex Java").

In 1768, Dutch botanist Nicolaas Laurens Burman acquired the two specimens and published names, descriptions and illustrations of them in his Flora Indica. S. spinulosa was wrongly identified as a Javanese fern, and named Polypodium spinulosum; A. truncata was similarly misidentified and misnamed. The specimen of A. truncata is now lost, but the specimen of S. spinulosa is extant, and currently lodged in the Herbarium of the Conservatoire et Jardin botaniques de la Ville de Genève (CJB) in Geneva, Switzerland; it is among the oldest extant botanical specimens of an Australian endemic. (Some older specimens collected by William Dampier, e.g. Swainsona formosa, still exist at the Druce Herbarium in Oxford, but were not described.)

The next known collection of S. spinulosa was made in December 1801, when King George Sound was visited by HMS Investigator under the command of Matthew Flinders. On board were botanist Robert Brown, botanical artist Ferdinand Bauer, and gardener Peter Good. All three men gathered material for Brown's specimen collection, including specimens of S. spinulosa. Neither Brown's nor Good's diary can be used to assign a precise location or date for the first collection of this species, but one of Brown's specimen slips is dated "Decr 19 1801".

Brown, however, did not recognise the species as distinct; in his specimen collection, specimens of S. spinulosa are attributed to S. polymorpha, and when he eventually published the genus in his 1810 monograph On the Proteaceae of Jussieu, he assigned Burman's Polypodium spinulosum to S. petiolaris.

In 1919, American botanist Elmer Drew Merrill identified Burman's Polypodium spinulosum with S. polymorpha. Claiming priority for Burman's name, he transferred P. spinulosum into Synaphea as S. spinulosa, relegating S. polymorpha to synonymy. This synonymy was accepted for many years, though the more established name S. polymorpha was preferred. The species was finally recognised as distinct in 1995 when Alex George divided S. polymorpha into several species in his treatment of the genus for the Flora of Australia series of monographs.

=== Subspecies ===
In 1995, Alex George described three subspecies of S. spinulosa in the Flora of Australia, and the names are accepted by the Australian Plant Census:

- Synaphea spinulosa subsp. borealis has a shorter flower than S. spinulosa subsp. major, a smaller fruit, is less hairy than S. spinulosa subsp. spinulosa and flowers from August to September.
- Synaphea spinulosa subsp. major has longer flowers than the other subspecies, and flowers from July to October.
- Synaphea spinulosa subsp. spinulosa has a shorter flower than S. spinulosa subsp. major, larger fruit and more hair than S. spinulosa subsp. major and flowers from July to October.

George notes that the species is highly variable, and there are several unstudied collections exhibiting interesting variability.

== Distribution and habitat ==
Synaphea spinulosa is widespread between Kalbarri and Bunbury and inland through the central and southern wheatbelt.

- Subspecies borealis grows in sand and sandy clay in kwongan from Kalbarri National Park almost to Geraldton.
- Subspecies major grows in sandy loam in kwongan between Ballidu and Calingiri, south-east to Southern Cross, south to Hopetoun and east to Israelite Bay.
- Subspecies spinulosa grows in sand and sandy gravel in Banksia woodland and kwongan north of Perth to Eneabba and south along the coastal plain to Bunbury.

== Conservation status ==
Synaphea spinulosa and all three subspecies are listed as 'not threatened' by the Government of Western Australia Department of Parks and Wildlife.
