= Eucalyptus baiophylla =

Conservation status
- Least Concern (IUCN 3.1)

Scientific classification
- Kingdom: Plantae
- Clade: Tracheophytes
- Clade: Angiosperms
- Clade: Eudicots
- Clade: Rosids
- Order: Myrtales
- Family: Myrtaceae
- Genus: Eucalyptus
- Species: E. alipes

Binomial name
- Eucalyptus alipes D.Nicolle & Brooker

Synonyms
- Eucalyptus giraliensis Paczk. & A.R.Chapm. nom. inval.; Eucalyptus giraliensis L.A.S.Johnson ms.; Eucalyptus prominens subsp. galea D.Nicolle ms.; Eucalyptus sp. Giralia Range (M.E.French 195) D.Nicolle

Species of eucalyptus

Eucalyptus baiophylla is a mallee that is endemic to the far west of Western Australia. It has rough, fibrous bark on all its stems, linear adult leaves, oval buds in groups of five or seven, white flowers and conical to more or less barrel-shaped fruit. It is similar to E. prominens which has less rough bark, larger, wider leaves and fruit with the valves more protruding.

== Description ==
Eucalyptus baiophylla is a mallee that often has sprawling lower branches, that grows to a height of 1–4 m (3–10 ft) and has a lignotuber. It has rough, loose, fibrous bark on all its stems. The leaves on young plants and on coppice regrowth are dull bluish green, linear and up to 75 mm (3 in) long and 6 mm (0.2 in) wide. Adult leaves are linear, 50–85 mm (2–3 in) long and 4–7 mm (0.2–0.3 in) wide and the same colour on both surfaces. The flowers are arranged in groups of five or seven in leaf axils on a peduncle 3–6 mm (0.1–0.2 in) long, individual flowers on a pedicel 0.5–2 mm (0.020–0.079 in) long. The mature buds are oval, 7–9 mm (0.28–0.35 in) long and 3.5–4.5 mm (0.14–0.18 in) wide. The operculum is hemispherical to conical, about the same length as the flower cup. The flowers are white and the fruit is a cone-shaped to slightly barrel-shaped capsule, 5–9 mm (0.20–0.35 in) long and 6–10 mm (0.24–0.39 in) wide with the valves not protruding above the rim.

== Taxonomy and naming ==
Eucalyptus baiophylla was first formally described in 2012 by Dean Nicolle and Ian Brooker from a specimen collected on the road to Exmouth, 48 km from the North West Coastal Highway. The specific epithet (baiophylla) is derived from the Ancient Greek words baios meaning "little" and phyllon meaning "leaf", referring to the small leaves of this species compared to those of E. zopherophloia and E. prominens.

== Distribution and habitat ==
This eucalypt grows in sand over limestone, often on low rises and occurs on the Giralia Range between the Exmouth Gulf and Lake MacLeod in the Carnarvon biogeographic region.

== Conservation ==
Eucalyptus baiophylla is classified as "not threatened" by the Western Australian Government Department of Parks and Wildlife.

== See also ==
- List of Eucalyptus species
