= S. polymorpha =

S. polymorpha may refer to:

- Sacciolepis polymorpha, a true grass
- Scolopendra polymorpha, a centipede indigenous to the Southwestern United States and northern Mexico
- Siphonosopra polymorpha, a possibly carcinogenic microorganism
- Sporichthya polymorpha, a gram-positive bacterium
- Stigmella polymorpha, a pigmy moth
- Synaphea polymorpha, a plant endemic to Western Australia
