= Tube stock =

Tube stock may refer to:

- London Underground rolling stock designed to work in "tube size" tunnels
- Tubestock, meaning plants ready for revegetation
