= Stigmella polymorpha =

Scientific classification
- Kingdom: Animalia
- Phylum: Arthropoda
- Clade: Pancrustacea
- Class: Insecta
- Order: Lepidoptera
- Family: Nepticulidae
- Genus: Stigmella
- Species: S. polymorpha

Binomial name
- Stigmella polymorpha Puplesis & Diškus, 2003

Species of moth

Stigmella polymorpha is a moth of the family Nepticulidae. It is known from the western part of the Kopet Dag ridge in Turkmenistan.

The larvae feed on Rosa species. They probably mine the leaves of their host plant.
