= Eucalyptus prominens =

Scientific classification
- Kingdom: Plantae
- Clade: Tracheophytes
- Clade: Angiosperms
- Clade: Eudicots
- Clade: Rosids
- Order: Myrtales
- Family: Myrtaceae
- Genus: Eucalyptus
- Species: E. prominens

Binomial name
- Eucalyptus prominens Brooker

Species of eucalyptus

Eucalyptus prominens is a species of mallee that is endemic to a small area on the west coast of Western Australia. It has smooth greyish bark, sometimes with rough bark near the base, lance-shaped adult leaves, flower buds in groups of seven or nine, white flowers and conical fruit.

== Description ==
Eucalyptus prominens is a mallee that typically grows to a height of 3–4 m (9.8–13.1 ft) and forms a lignotuber. It has smooth greyish to brownish bark, sometimes with fibrous bark at the base of the trunk. Young plants and coppice regrowth have more or less sessile, narrow lance-shaped leaves that are 55–80 mm (2.2–3.1 in) long and 12–20 mm (0.47–0.79 in) wide. Adult leaves are the same shade of glossy green on both sides, lance-shaped to narrow lance-shaped, 80–145 mm (3.1–5.7 in) long and 12–20 mm (0.47–0.79 in) wide, tapering to a petiole 5–13 mm (0.20–0.51 in) long. The flower buds are arranged in leaf axils in groups of seven or nine on an unbranched peduncle 10–12 mm (0.39–0.47 in) wide, the individual buds sessile or on pedicels up to 4 mm (0.16 in) long. Mature buds are oval to club-shaped, 7–11 mm (0.28–0.43 in) long and 5–8 mm (0.20–0.31 in) wide with a rounded operculum. Flowering occurs from August to Octoberand the flowers are white. The fruit is a woody, conical capsule 6–11 mm (0.24–0.43 in) long and 7–10 mm (0.28–0.39 in) wide with the valves near rime level.

== Taxonomy and naming ==
Eucalyptus prominens was first described in 1976 by Ian Brooker in the journal Nuytsia from material collected in the Shothole Canyon in the Cape Range National Park in 1970. The specific epithet (prominens) is a Latin word meaning "prominent", referring to the valves of the fruit, compared to those or related species.

== Distribution and habitat ==
This mallee is restricted to limestone hills and valleys in the Cape Range in the Carvarvon biogeographic region.

== Conservation status ==
This eucalypt is classified as "not threatened" by the Western Australian Government Department of Parks and Wildlife,

== See also ==
- List of Eucalyptus species
