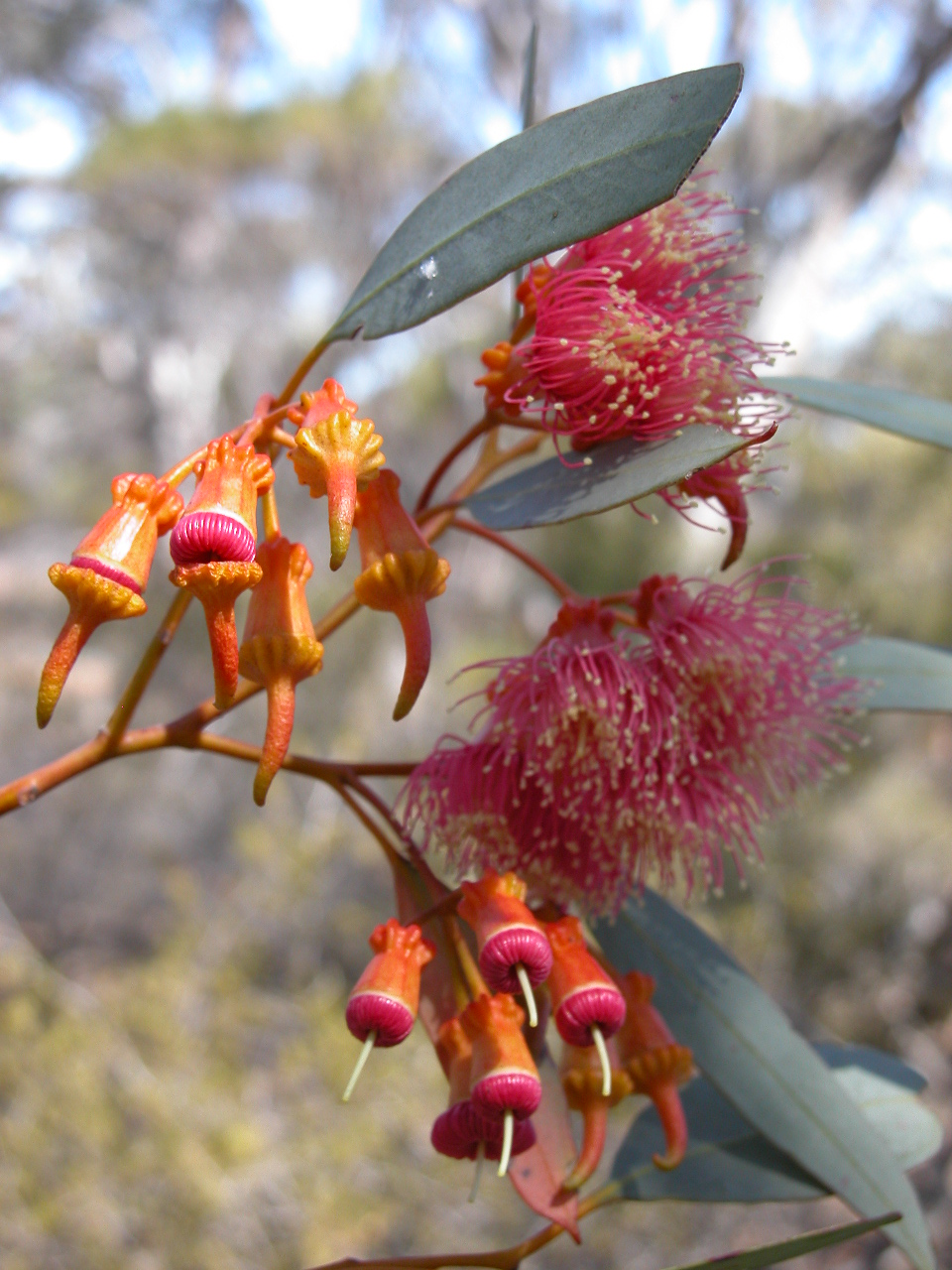

Scientific classification
- Kingdom: Plantae
- Clade: Tracheophytes
- Clade: Angiosperms
- Clade: Eudicots
- Clade: Rosids
- Order: Myrtales
- Family: Myrtaceae
- Genus: Eucalyptus
- Species: E. torquata

Binomial name
- Eucalyptus torquata Luehm.

= Eucalyptus torquata =

Coral gum

Species of eucalyptus

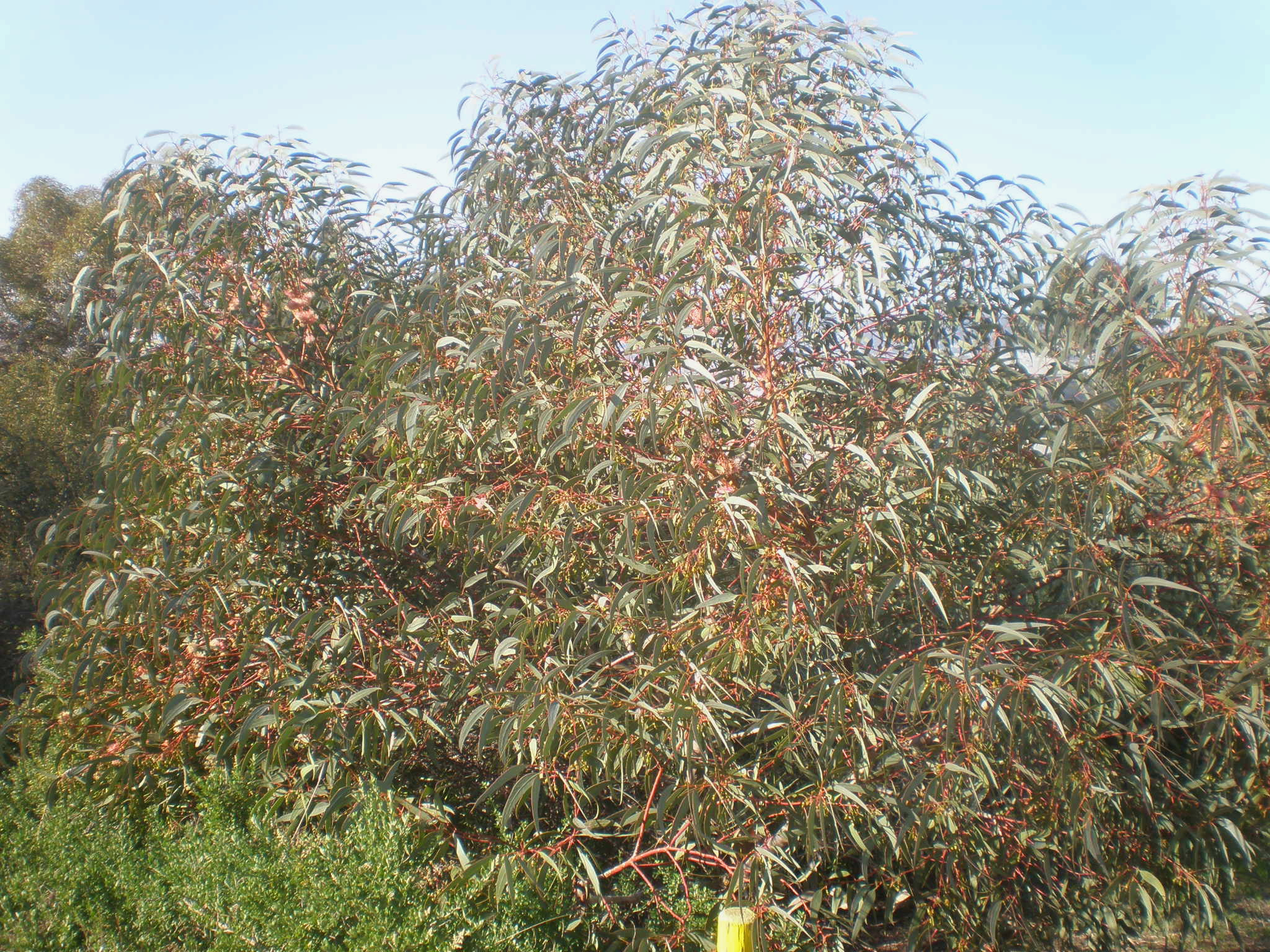
Eucalyptus torquata habit

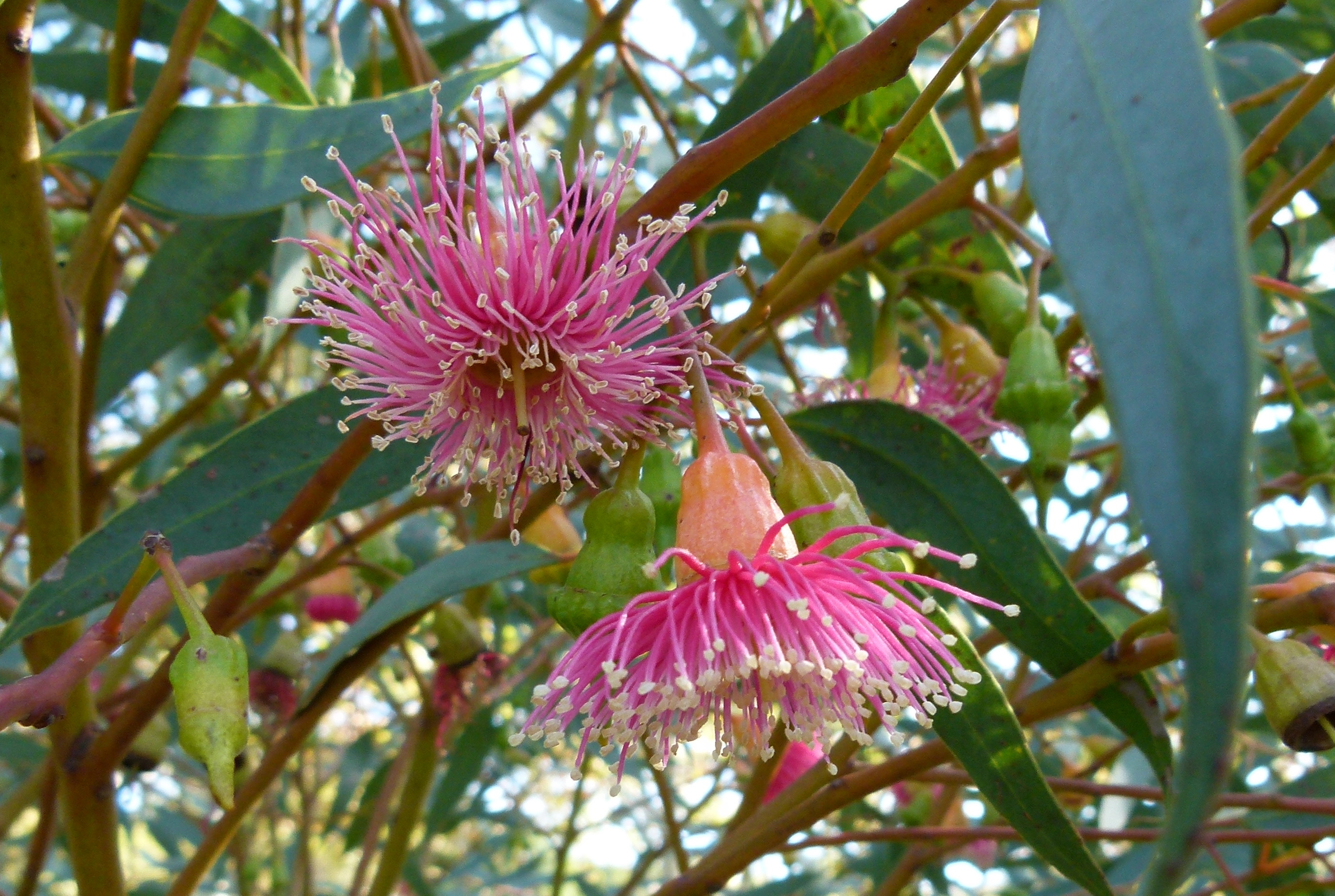
Eucalyptus torquata inflorescences

Eucalyptus torquata, commonly known as coral gum or Coolgardie gum, is an endemic tree of Western Australia. The species is cultivated for use in gardens and as a street tree.

== Description ==
A tree, small and stout in form, with beautiful flowers. It reaches between 4 and 11 metres (13 and 36 ft) in height in its native habitat which has a spreading habit. It produces clusters of orange barrel-shaped buds with horned caps, which are followed by prolific red or pink flowers between August and December. The bark is rough and is persistent on the trunk and branches. The bark is fibrous-flaky box type grey-black, grey or black colour bark with whitish patches. The leaves are greyish green in colour, the blade has a lanceolate shape and is 90 to 120 mm (3.5 to 4.7 in) in length and 15 to 20 millimetres (0.6 to 0.8 in) wide. The leaves are basally tapered, the petioles are quadrangular or narrowly flattened or channelled. The conflorescences have a diameter that are 35 mm (1.4 in) with flowers that are normally coral-pink in colour but white, cream and red flowered plants are known. They are simple and axillary with three to seven flowered umbellasters with terete peduncles. The buds have a rostrate or urceolate shape and are not pruinose, the calyx calyptrate sheds early. The fruits that form later have a cylindrical shape with a depressed disc and enclosed valves.

== Taxonomy ==
The species was first formally described by the botanist Johann George Luehmann in 1897 in Victorian Naturalist. The type specimen was collected by W.A. Macpherson from near Coolgardie.

The species name torquata is taken from the Latin word torquatus meaning having a twisted ring or collar. This refers to the corrugated structure found at the base of the buds and fruit.

Amongst the common names of the species is the use of Christmas tree, given for flowers that appear in December, and Goldfields red flowering gum for the region's mining operations.

== Distribution ==
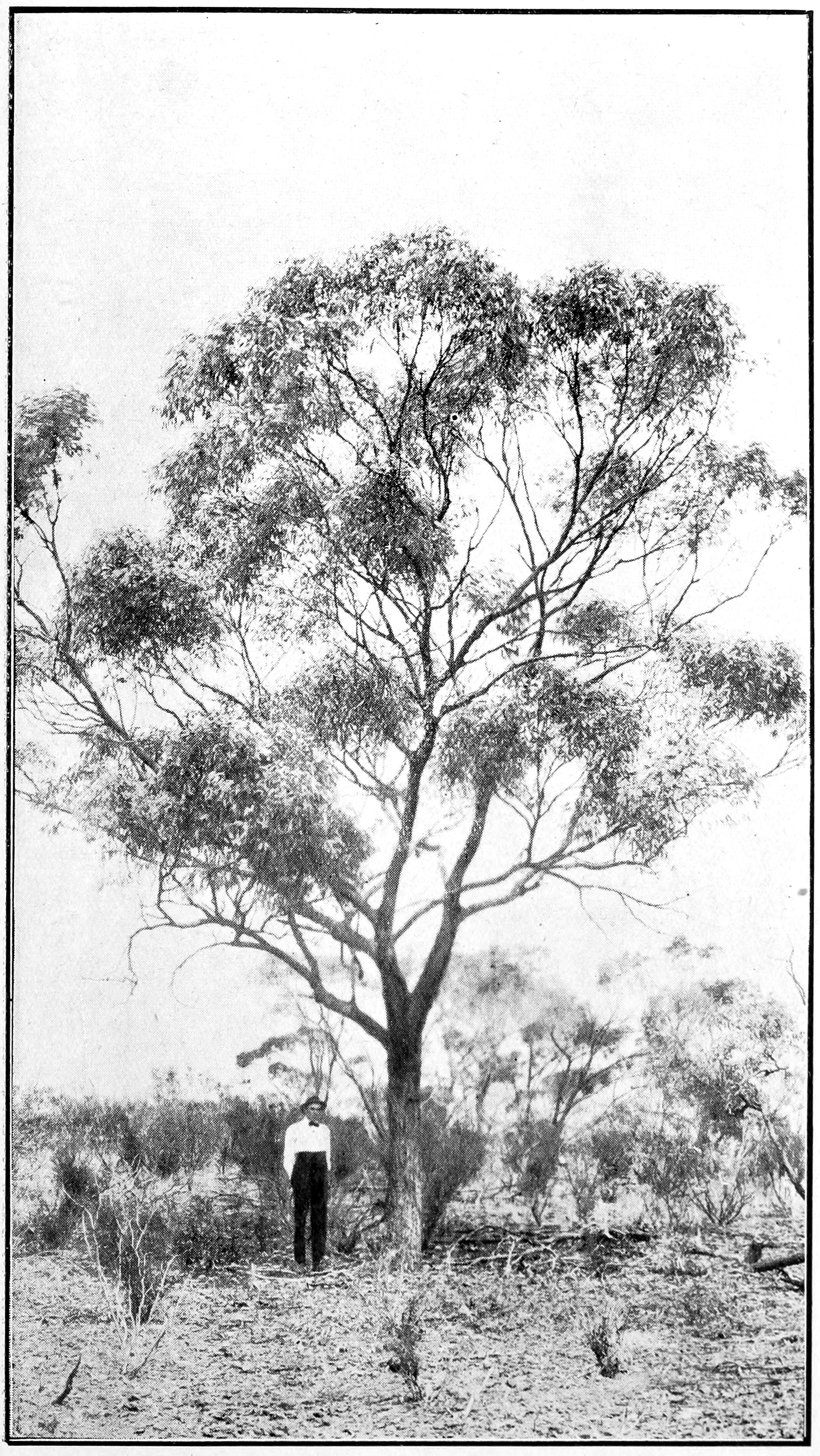
Mature tree in native habitat, circa 1920

It is found on hillsides around Kalgoorlie and Coolgardie, and south to about Widgiemooltha in the Goldfields region of Western Australia where it grows in stony loam or clay and red sandy soils.

== Uses ==
Coral gum is commonly cultivated for small gardens and for use as an ornamental or as a street tree, especially in arid areas. Flowering often occurs in 2 years from seed. It can be grown in large containers in well-drained soils.

== See also ==
- List of Eucalyptus species
- Lemon-flowered Mallee (Eucalyptus woodwardii and Torwood hybrids)
