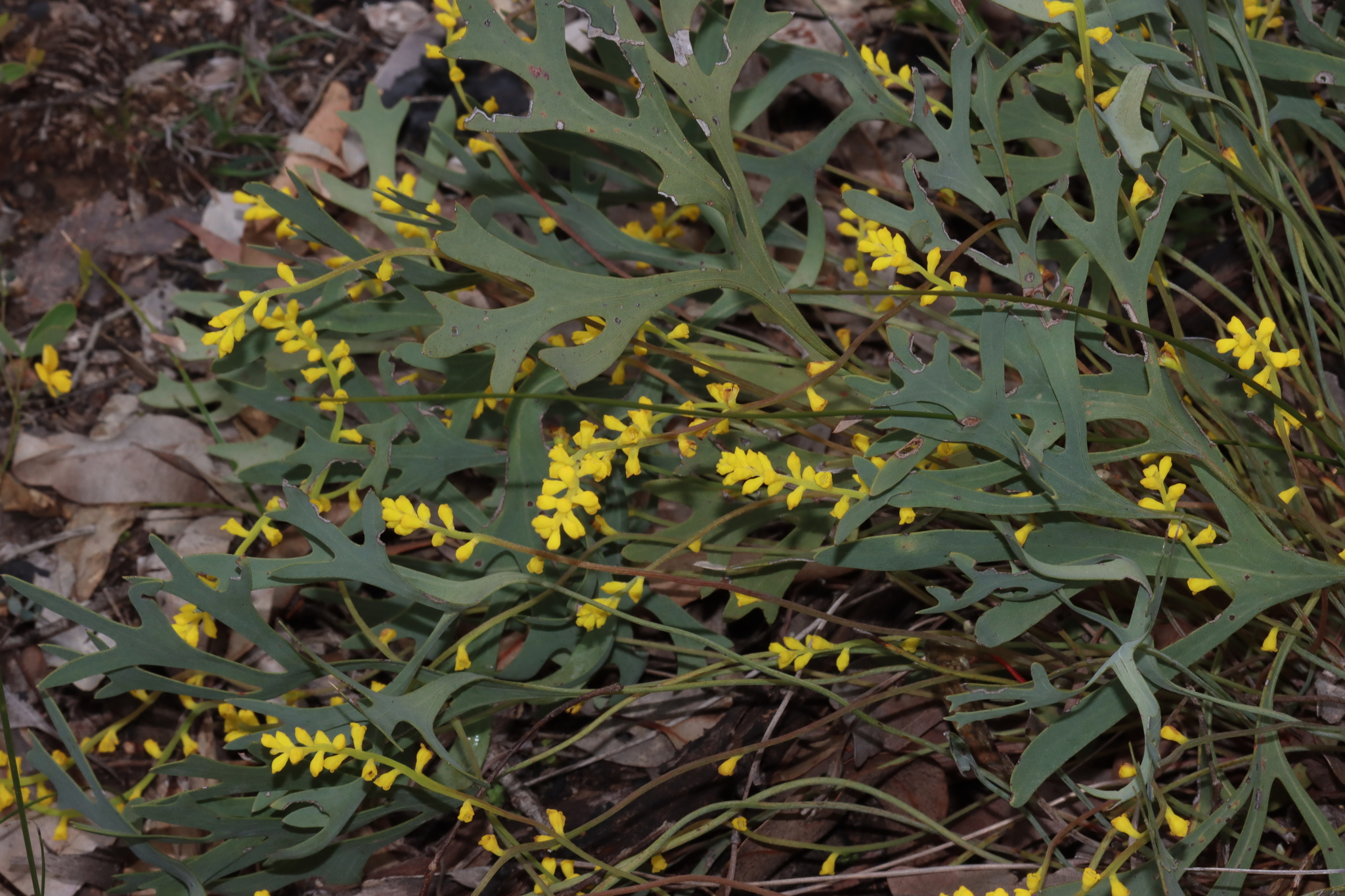

Scientific classification
- Kingdom: Plantae
- Clade: Tracheophytes
- Clade: Angiosperms
- Clade: Eudicots
- Order: Proteales
- Family: Proteaceae
- Genus: Synaphea
- Species: S. petiolaris

Binomial name
- Synaphea petiolaris R.Br.

= Synaphea petiolaris =

Species of Australian shrub in the family Proteaceae

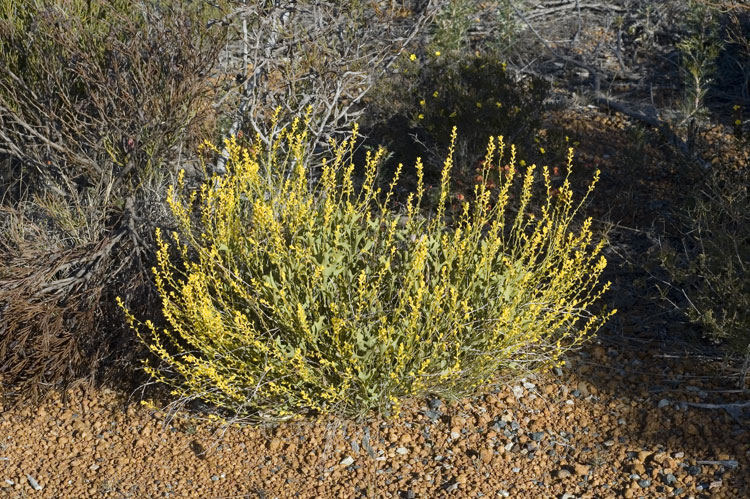
Habit in the East Naemup Nature Reserve

Synaphea petiolaris is a species of flowering plant in the family Proteaceae and is endemic to the south west of Western Australia. It is a shrub with tufted stems, simple or deeply lobed to pinnatipartite leaves, and spikes of widely spaced yellow flowers.

== Description ==
Synaphea petiolaris is a shrub that typically grows to a height of up to 60 cm (24 in) and has tufted stems up to 100 mm (3.9 in) long, sometimes covered with soft hairs pressed against the surface. Its leaves are usually deeply three-lobed to pinnatipartite, 60–200 mm (2.4–7.9 in) long on a petiole, the primary lobes simple or deeply lobed. The lobes are linear to lance-shaped, 5–8 mm (0.20–0.31 in) long. The flowers are yellow and widely spaced in spikes 30–150 mm (1.2–5.9 in) long on simple or branched peduncles 70–350 mm (2.8–13.8 in) long, with bracts 1.0–1.5 mm (0.039–0.059 in) long. The perianth is ascending, the opening more or less wide, sparsely hairy or glabrous. The upper tepal is 4.0–5.5 mm (0.16–0.22 in) long and 1.9–2.5 mm (0.075–0.098 in) wide and the lower tepal 3.5–4.0 mm (0.14–0.16 in) long. The stigma is broadly egg-shaped to oblong, deeply notched to horned, 0.8–1.3 mm (0.031–0.051 in) long and 0.9–1.1 mm (0.035–0.043 in) wide. The ovary is covered with soft hairs to almost glabrous. Flowering occurs from June to December or January, and the fruit is elliptic to egg-shaped on a prominent neck and beaked, 5–6 mm (0.20–0.24 in) long with spreading hairs or glabrous.

== Taxonomy ==
Synaphea petiolaris was first formally described in 1810 by Robert Brown in Transactions of the Linnean Society of London. The specific epithet (petiolaris) means 'borne on a petiole'.

In 1995, Alex George described three subspecies of Synaphea petiolaris in the Flora of Australia, and the names are accepted by the Australian Plant Census:

- Synaphea petiolaris R.Br. subsp. petiolaris has primary leaf lobes with two or three lobes on a petiole 50–270 mm (2.0–10.6 in) long, and flowers from August to October.
- Synaphea petiolaris subsp. simplex A.S.George has simple leaves on a petiole up to 130 mm (5.1 in) long. It flowers in September and October.
- Synaphea petiolaris subsp. triloba A.S.George has leaves with three lobes, rarely four or five lobes, the lower leaf lobes simple, on a petiole 100–200 mm (3.9–7.9 in) long. It flowers from August to October.

== Distribution and habitat ==
Synaphea petiolaris is found around swamps and on sand plains, slopes and low-lying areas in the Esperance Plains, Jarrah Forest, Mallee, Swan Coastal Plain and Warren bioregions of south-western Western Australia.

- Subspecies petiolaris often grows in low-lying areas in sand or sandy loam, sometimes over laterite or granite and is widespread from Walpole, east to Cape Arid National Park, inland to the Stirling Range and north to Wooroloo.
- Subspecies simplex grows in sandy soils on flats and winter-wet areas in open eucalypt woodland and is restricted to areas north-east of Busselton in the Jarrah Forest and Swan Coastal Plain bioregions.
- Subspecies triloba grows in sandy soils in swampy areas and clay flats from Walpole to Busselton in the Jarrah Forest, Swan Coastal Plain and Warren bioregions.

== Conservation status ==
Synaphea petiolaris and two of its subspecies are listed as "not threatened" by the Government of Western Australia Department of Biodiversity, Conservation and Attractions, but subsp. simplex is listed as "Priority Three" by the Government of Western Australia, Department of Biodiversity, Conservation and Attractions, meaning that it is poorly known and known from only a few locations but is not under imminent threat.
