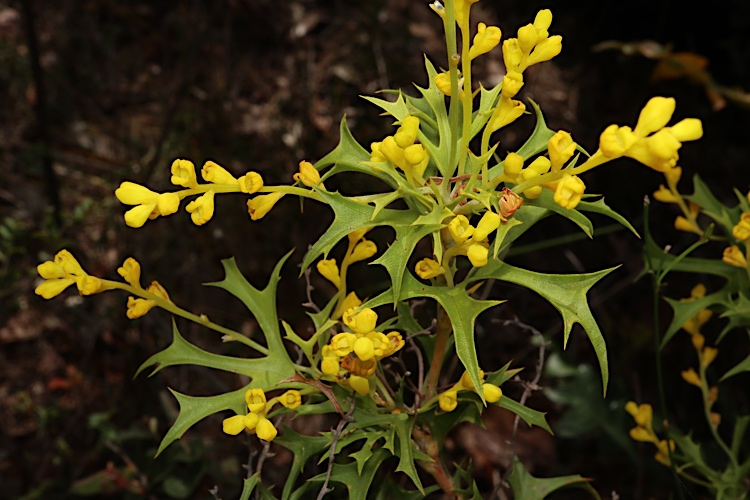

Scientific classification
- Kingdom: Plantae
- Clade: Tracheophytes
- Clade: Angiosperms
- Clade: Eudicots
- Order: Proteales
- Family: Proteaceae
- Genus: Synaphea
- Species: S. polymorpha

Binomial name
- Synaphea polymorpha R.Br.

= Synaphea polymorpha =

Species of shrub endemic to Western Australia

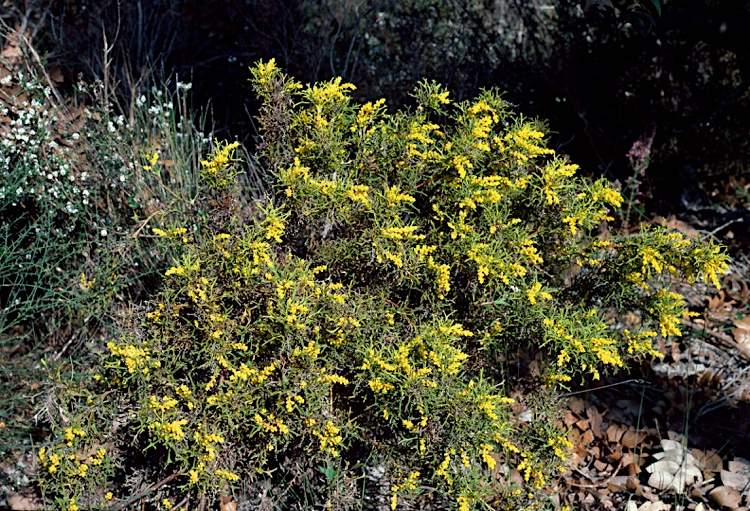
Habit near Narrikup

Synaphea polymorpha, commonly known as Albany synaphea, is a species of flowering plant in the family Proteaceae and is endemic to the south west of Western Australia. The Noongar peoples know the plant as bindak. It is a slender or rounded shrub with sharply pointed, three-part leaves, more or less crowded spikes of yellow flowers, and beaked, elliptic, hairy fruit.

== Description ==
Synaphea polymorpha is a slender or rounded shrub that typically grows to a height of 15–70 cm (5.9–27.6 in). Its leaves are three part, 20–30 mm (0.79–1.18 in) long and 30–50 mm (1.2–2.0 in) wide on a petiole 4–6 mm (0.16–0.24 in) long, the primary lobes 3–4 mm (0.12–0.16 in) wide and the end lobes with up to three teeth concave, sharply pointed teeth. The flowers are yellow and borne in more or less crowded spikes 10–30 mm (0.39–1.18 in) long on a peduncle 10–20 mm (0.39–0.79 in) long with bracts 2 mm (0.079 in) long. The perianth has a narrow opening, the upper tepal 5.0–6.5 mm (0.20–0.26 in) long and 1.8–2.8 mm (0.071–0.110 in) wide, the lower tepal 5 mm (0.20 in) long with a more or less erect, narrow tip. The stigma is egg-shaped to oblong, concave, very thick and curved at the tip, 1.4–1.89 mm (0.055–0.074 in) long and 0.9–1.1 mm (0.035–0.043 in) wide and the ovary is covered with soft hairs. Flowering occurs from August to November and the fruit is elliptic, beaked, 5 mm (0.20 in) long and covered with fine, soft hair.

== Taxonomy ==
Synaphea polymorpha was first formally described in 1810 by Robert Brown in Transactions of the Linnean Society of London. The specific epithet (polymorpha) means 'many-shaped', or variably shaped in different plants.

== Distribution and habitat ==
Albany synaphea grows on hillsides, low-lying areas and swamps in sandy loam and lateritic soil in woodland and kwongan, mainly within 30 km (19 mi) of Albany, in the Esperance Plain, Jarrah Forest, Swan Coastal Plain and Warren bioregions of south-western Western Australia.

== Conservation status ==
Synaphea polymorpha is listed as "not threatened" by the Western Australian Government Department of Biodiversity, Conservation and Attractions.
