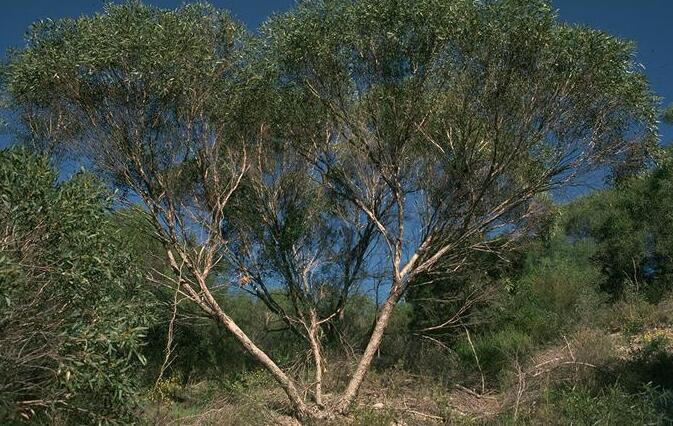
- Near Dongara

Conservation status
- Priority Four — Rare Taxa (DEC)

Scientific classification
- Kingdom: Plantae
- Clade: Tracheophytes
- Clade: Angiosperms
- Clade: Eudicots
- Clade: Rosids
- Order: Myrtales
- Family: Myrtaceae
- Genus: Eucalyptus
- Species: E. zopherophloia

Binomial name
- Eucalyptus zopherophloia Brooker & Hopper

= Eucalyptus zopherophloia =

Blackbutt mallee

Species of eucalyptus

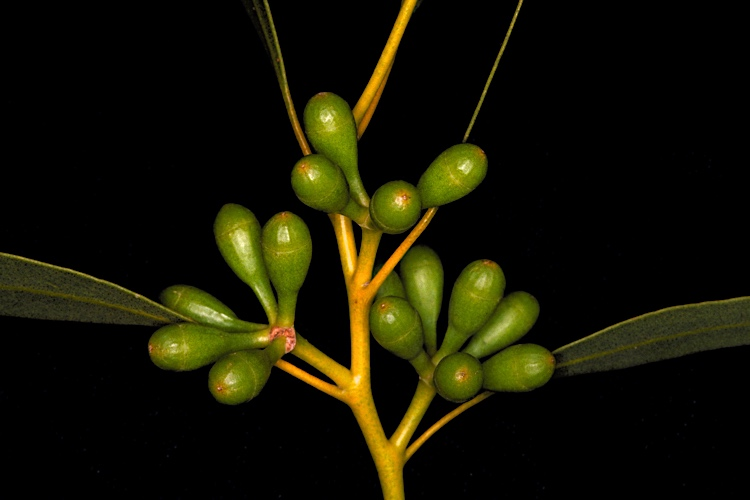
Flower buds

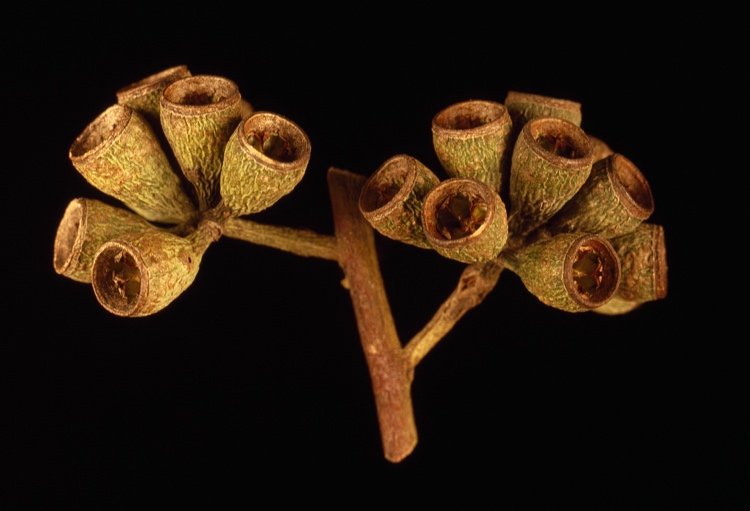
Fruit

Eucalyptus zopherophloia, commonly known as the blackbutt mallee, is a species of spreading mallee that is endemic to an area on the west coast of Western Australia. It has rough bark over part or all of the trunk, smooth grey bark above, narrow lance-shaped leaves, flower buds in groups of nine or eleven, creamy white flowers and conical fruit.

== Description ==
Eucalyptus zopherophloia is a spreading mallee that typically grows to a height of 2.5–6 m (8 ft 2 in – 19 ft 8 in) and forms a lignotuber. It has rough, fibrous bark over part or all of the trunks, smooth grey bark above. The adult leaves are arranged alternately, the same shade of dull to slightly glossy light green on both sides, narrow lance-shaped to narrow elliptical, 45–103 mm (1.8–4.1 in) long and 5–13 mm (0.20–0.51 in) wide, tapering to a petiole 5–17 mm (0.20–0.67 in) long. The flower buds are arranged in leaf axils in groups of nine or eleven on an unbranched peduncle 4–15 mm (0.16–0.59 in) long, the individual buds on pedicels 1–4 mm (0.039–0.157 in) long. Mature buds are oval, 7–10 mm (0.28–0.39 in) long and 4–5 mm (0.16–0.20 in) wide with a rounded operculum. Flowering occurs between October and January and the flowers are creamy white. The fruit is a woody conical capsule 6–10 mm (0.24–0.39 in) long and 6–9 mm (0.24–0.35 in) wide with the valves near rim level. Trees can reach an age of 70 years.

== Taxonomy and naming ==
Eucalyptus zopherophloia was first formally described by the botanists Ian Brooker and Stephen Hopper in 1993 in the journal Nuytsia from specimens collected by Brooker in 1986 at an area north of Coolimba. The specific epithet (zopherophloia) is from ancient Greek words meaning "dusky" and "bark".

== Distribution and habitat ==
Blackbutt mallee is found in coastal areas between Jurien Bay and Zuytdorp Cliffs where it grows in grey or white sand with limestone rubble.

== Conservation status ==
This eucalypt is classified as "Priority Four" by the Government of Western Australia Department of Parks and Wildlife, meaning that is rare or near threatened.

The International Union for the Conservation of Nature has the species listed as being of least concern since 2019 with a stable population, although it notes the population is severely fragmented with a continuing decline of mature individuals.

== See also ==
- List of Eucalyptus species
