= Tubestock =

Tubestock is the plural term for young plants which have been grown to the point where they are ready for either planting out in the field or potting on to larger pot sizes. Smaller, shallower pots (approx. 50 mm in diameter x 80 mm deep) are usually used to grow Tubestock in for the purpose of them being potted on to larger sizes. Larger, deeper pots (approx. 50 mm square x 120 mm deep) are generally preferred for planting out in the field, as in the case of Revegetation and Landscaping. The term tubestock mostly refers to seedlings grown in individual pots (or Tubes) as opposed to smaller seedlings grown in cell-trays containing from 100 to 500 plants, which are referred to as "Plugs".
