= Kulin =

Kulin may refer to:

== Places ==
- Kulin, Western Australia, a small town in Australia
  - Shire of Kulin, a local government area
- Kulin, Iran, a village near Tehran
- Kulin, Lower Silesian Voivodeship, a village in south-west Poland
- Kulin, Kuyavian-Pomeranian Voivodeship, a village in north-central Poland
- 3019 Kulin, a main-belt asteroid

== Other uses ==
- Kulin people, an Australian Aboriginal nation
- Kulin languages, a group of Australian languages
- Kulin Brahmin, a clan of India
- Kulin Kayastha, a clan of India
- Kulin (surname) (including a list of people with the name)
- Ban Kulin, Ban of Bosnia from 1180 to 1204

== See also ==
- Culin (disambiguation)
- Kulen, a type of sausage
- Kulinism, a type of Hindu caste and marriage rules
- Qulin, a town in the United States
