= Cullen =

Cullen may refer to:

== Places ==
=== Canada ===
- Cullen, Saskatchewan, a former hamlet in Benson No. 35 Rural Municipality

=== Ireland ===
- Cullen, County Cork, a village near Boherbue, County Cork
- Cullen, County Tipperary, a small village in County Tipperary

=== Scotland ===
- Cullen, Moray, a village in Moray
- Cullen (Parliament of Scotland constituency), a pre-1707 constituency

=== United States ===
- Cullen, Kentucky
- Cullen, Louisiana, a town in Webster Parish
- Cullen, New York, a hamlet in the town of Warren
- Cullen, Virginia
- Cullen, Wisconsin, an unincorporated community in Oconto County

== People ==
- Cullen (surname), an Irish surname (includes a list)
- Cullen A. Battle (1829–1905), American general and attorney
- Cullen Baker (1835–1869), American criminal
- Cullen Bunn (born 1971), American writer
- Cullen Finnerty (1982–2013), American football player
- C. J. Fite Cullen Fite (born 2005), American football player
- Cullen Gillaspia (born 1995), American football player
- Cullen Harper (born 1986), American former football player
- Cullen Hightower (1923–2008), American writer
- Cullen Jenkins (born 1981), American football player
- Cullen Jones (born 1984), American swimmer
- Cullen Landis (1896–1975), American actor and director
- Cullen Moss (born 1975), American actor
- Cullen Potter (born 2007), American ice hockey player
- Cullen Rogers (1921–1997), American football player
- Cullen Washington Jr. (born 1972), American abstract painter

== Fictional entities ==
- Cullen Bloodstone, a character in Marvel Comics
- Cullen Bohannon, the protagonist of the television series Hell on Wheels
- Cullen Crisp, a character in Kindergarten Cop
- Cullen Row, a character in DC Comics
- Cullen Rutherford, a recurring character in the Dragon Age series
- Cullen family of vampires, in the Twilight series by Stephenie Meyer
- Cullen Virus, a fictional virus in "Berlin", an episode of The Blacklist

== Other uses ==
- Cullen Center in Houston, Texas
- Cullen (plant), a genus of legumes native to the Old World
- Cullen College of Engineering, an academic college at the University of Houston
- Cullen number, a natural number of the form n · 2^{n} + 1 (written C_{n})
- Cullen skink, a thick Scottish soup
- Cullen Wines, a winery in Western Australia

== See also ==
- Cullen's sign, blue-black bruising of the area around the umbilicus
- Culen (disambiguation)
- Kullen (disambiguation)
- Cullens (disambiguation)
