= Acacia kulinensis =

Kulin wattle

Conservation status
- Priority One — Poorly Known Taxa (DEC)

Scientific classification
- Kingdom: Plantae
- Clade: Embryophytes
- Clade: Tracheophytes
- Clade: Spermatophytes
- Clade: Angiosperms
- Clade: Eudicots
- Clade: Rosids
- Order: Fabales
- Family: Fabaceae
- Subfamily: Caesalpinioideae
- Clade: Mimosoid clade
- Genus: Acacia
- Species: A. kulinensis

Binomial name
- Acacia kulinensis Maslin

Species of legume

Acacia kulinensis, also known as Kulin wattle, is a species of flowering plant in the family Fabaceae and is endemic to a small area of inland Western Australia. It is an intricately branched, prickly shrub with clusters of oblong to elliptic or lance-shaped phyllodes, spherical heads of bright yellow flowers and thinly leathery, mostly curved or twisted pods, appearing somewhat like a string of beads.

== Description ==
Acacia kulinensis is an intricately branched, prickly shrub that typically grows to a height of 0.5–1.5 m (1 ft 8 in – 4 ft 11 in) and has grey bark. Its phyllodes are in clusters of usually four to ten and are oblong to elliptic or egg-shaped with the narrower end towards the base, 2–3 mm (0.079–0.118 in) long and 0.6–1.0 mm (0.024–0.039 in) wide, straight and glabrous with obscure veins, on a pulvinus 0.3–0.5 mm (0.012–0.020 in) long. There are sharply pointed by brittle stipules 2–3 mm (0.079–0.118 in) long below the phyllodes clusters. The flowers are borne in spherical heads on slender peduncles 4–10 mm (0.16–0.39 in) long, each head about 4 mm (0.16 in) in diameter with 17 to 20 bright yellow flowers. Flowering occurs in September, and the pods are thinly leathery, 20–50 mm (0.79–1.97 in) long, 3.0–3.5 mm (0.12–0.14 in) wide and mostly curved or twisted, clearly raised over the seeds and shallowly constricted between them, appearing somewhat like a string of beads.

== Taxonomy ==
Acacia kulinensis was first formally described in 2014 in the journal Nuytsia from specimens he collected near Kulin in 2013. The specific epithet (kulinensis) means 'native of Kulin'.

== Distribution and habitat ==
Kulin wattle often grows in gravelly sand or sandy loam over clay in low shrubland in a very restricted area near Kulin in the Mallee bioregion of inland Western Australia.

== Conservation status ==
Acacia kulinensis is listed as "Priority One" by the Government of Western Australia Department of Biodiversity, Conservation and Attractions, meaning that it is known from only one or a few locations that are potentially at risk.

== See also ==
- List of Acacia species
