= Acacia chrysopoda =

Scientific classification
- Kingdom: Plantae
- Clade: Tracheophytes
- Clade: Angiosperms
- Clade: Eudicots
- Clade: Rosids
- Order: Fabales
- Family: Fabaceae
- Subfamily: Caesalpinioideae
- Clade: Mimosoid clade
- Genus: Acacia
- Species: A. chrysopoda

Binomial name
- Acacia chrysopoda Maiden & Blakely
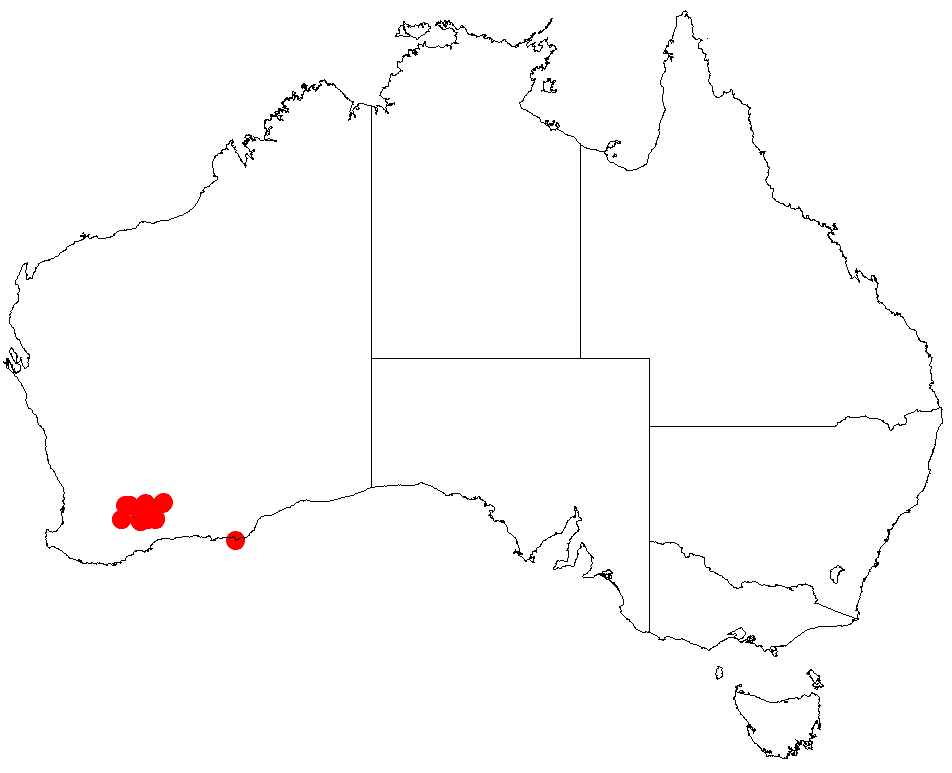
- Occurrence data from AVH

Synonyms
- Racosperma chrysopodum (Maiden & Blakely) Pedley

Species of legume

Acacia chrysopoda is a species of flowering plant in the family Fabaceae and is endemic to the south-west of Western Australia. It is a compact, densely branched shrub, with hairy branchlets, linear phyllodes crowded at the ends of branchlets, spherical heads of light golden yellow flowers and linear to narrowly oblong, more or less curved, thinly leathery pods.

== Description ==
Acacia chrysopoda is a compact, densely branched shrub that typically grows to a height of 0.3–1 m (1 ft 0 in – 3 ft 3 in) and has branchlets covered with golden or white hairs when young. The phyllodes are crowded at the ends of branchlets, linear to lance-shaped with the narrower end towards the base, 10–20 mm (0.39–0.79 in) long, 1–2 mm (0.039–0.079 in) wide with one to three, more or less indistinct main longitudinal veins. The flowers are arranged in one or two spherical heads in axils on a peduncle mostly 7–10 mm (0.28–0.39 in) long. Each head is 5–6 mm (0.20–0.24 in) in diameter with mostly 30 to 45 light golden yellow flowers. Flowering occurs from about July to August and the pods are linear to narrowly oblong, more or less curved, thinly leathery and 20–35 mm (0.79–1.38 in) long and 3–4 mm (0.12–0.16 in) wide.

== Taxonomy ==
Acacia chrysopoda was first formally described in 1928 by the botanists Joseph Maiden and William Blakely in the Journal of the Royal Society of Western Australia from specimens apparently collected near Cape Arid by George Maxwell. (The collection from near "Cape Arid" is likely to be an error by Maxwell.) The specific epithet (chrysopoda) means 'golden foot', referring to the golden hairs on the peduncles.

== Distribution ==
This species of wattle grows in sand or loam in Eucalyptus woodland between Karlgarin Hill and south to Newdegate and Lake King in the Coolgardie and Mallee bioregions of south-western Western Australia.

== Conservation status ==
Acacia chrysopoda is listed as "not threatened" by the Government of Western Australia Department of Biodiversity, Conservation and Attractions.

== See also ==
- List of Acacia species
