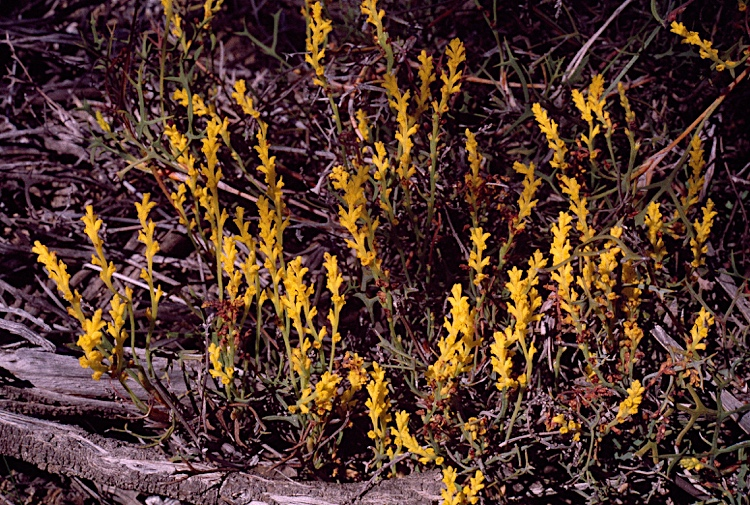

Conservation status
- Priority Three — Poorly Known Taxa (DEC)

Scientific classification
- Kingdom: Plantae
- Clade: Tracheophytes
- Clade: Angiosperms
- Clade: Eudicots
- Order: Proteales
- Family: Proteaceae
- Genus: Synaphea
- Species: S. constricta

Binomial name
- Synaphea constricta A.S.George

= Synaphea constricta =

Species of Australian shrub in the family Proteaceae

Synaphea constricta is a species of flowering plant in the family Proteaceae and is endemic to the south-west of Western Australia. It is a compact, tufted shrub with widely spreading, more or less flat, pinnatipartite leaves with sharply pointed lobes, and spikes of moderately crowded yellow flowers.

== Description ==
Synaphea constricta is a compact, tufted shrub that typically grows to a height of 20–50 cm (7.9–19.7 in) with few branches covered with soft hairs at first, but soon glabrous. The leaves are flat, 30–80 mm (1.2–3.1 in) long and up to 60–80 mm (2.4–3.1 in) wide on a petiole 15–60 mm (0.59–2.36 in) long. The end lobes are almost flat, triangular, 2–6 mm (0.079–0.236 in) and sharply pointed. The flowers are yellow and borne in moderately crowded spikes 20–120 mm (0.79–4.72 in) long on a peduncle 20–40 mm (0.79–1.57 in) long with spreading bracts 1.5–2 mm (0.059–0.079 in) long and more or less glabrous. The perianth has a narrow opening, the upper tepal 3.7–4.5 mm (0.15–0.18 in) long and 1.5 mm (0.059 in) wide and gently curved, the lower tepal 2.5–2.9 mm (0.098–0.114 in) long with a prominently curved tip. The stigma is oblong but narrowed in the middle, notched or with two lobes, the ovary covered with soft hairs. Flowering occurs from June to September.

== Taxonomy ==
Synaphea constricta was first formally described in 1995 by Alex George in the Flora of Australia from specimens he collected north of Wongan Hills on the road to Ballidu in 1988. The specific epithet (constricta) means 'constricted', referring to the stigma.

== Distribution and habitat ==
This species of Synaphea grows in sand, sandy clay-loam over laterite in kwongan and mallee-kwongan near Wongan Hills, Manmanning, Minnivale east of Dowerin, Kellerberrin and Bendering in the Avon Wheatbelt and Mallee bioregions of south-western Western Australia.

== Conservation status ==
Synaphea constricta is listed as "Priority Three" by the Government of Western Australia Department of Biodiversity, Conservation and Attractions, meaning that it is poorly known and known from only a few locations but is not under imminent threat.
