= Jitarning =

Locality in Wheatbelt of Western Australia

- Town
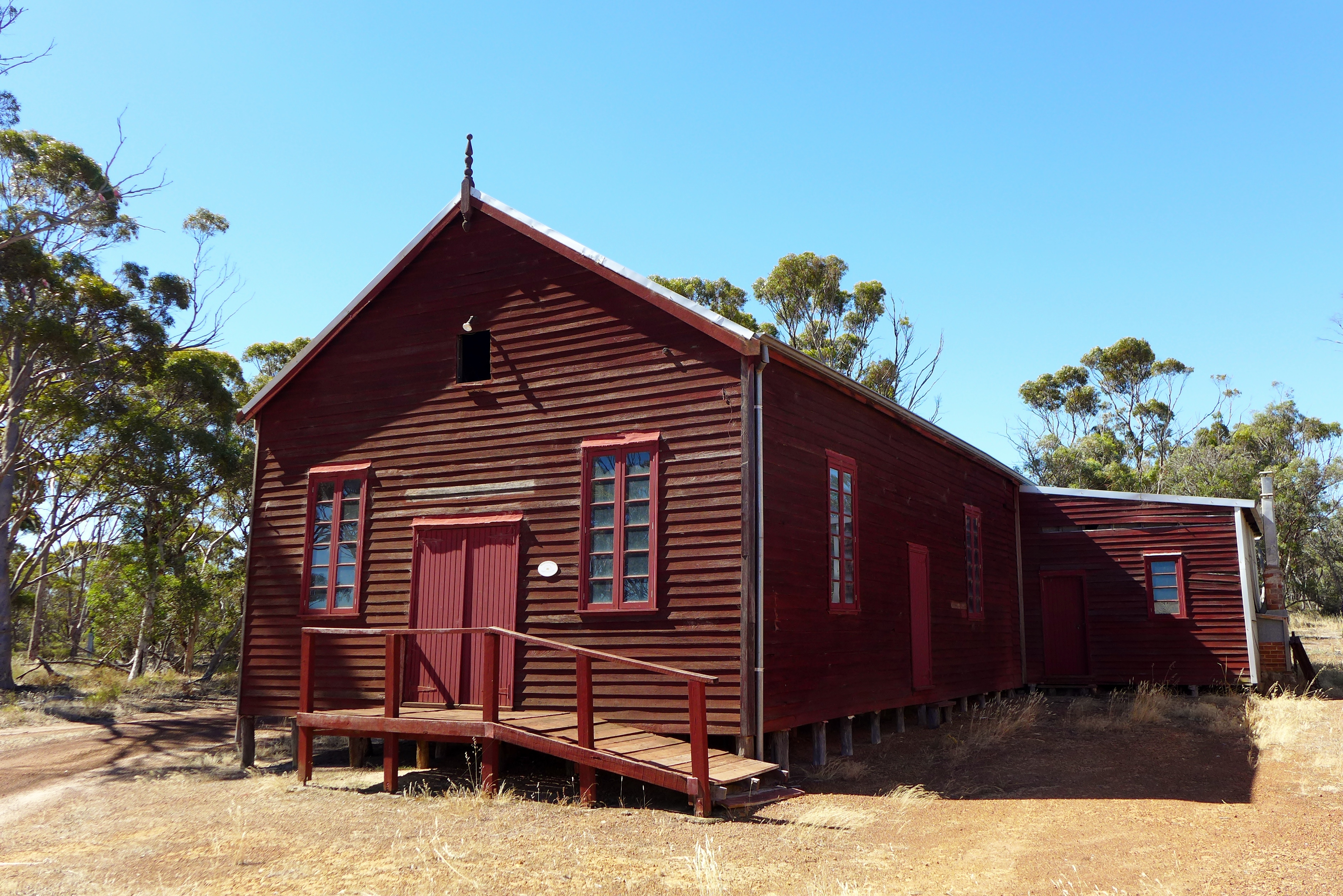
- Jitarning Hall, 2014

- Coordinates: 32.7859°0′S 117.9966°0′E
- Country: Australia
- State: Western Australia
- LGA: Shire of Kulin
- Location: 257.7 km (160.1 mi) SE of Perth
- Established: 1917
- Elevation: 342 m (1,122 ft)

Population
  - Total: 72
- Postcode: 6365

Jitarning is a locality in the Shire of Kulin in Western Australia, with a population of 63 according to the 2021 Census.

== Location ==
Jitarning is located approximately 22km south of the town of Kulin.

== History ==
Michael Brown, founder of the Narrogin Road Board and the Narrogin Flour Mills, took up a pastoral lease and established a base camp at Jitarning (formerly Geetaring) soak. The presence of the nearby water sources drew in settlers and future residents. Jitarning was gazetted in 1917 after the construction of the Merredin to Yilliminning railway line connected the small settlement.

An inability to get a liquor licence hindered Jitarning's development into a small town; the neighbouring Kulin's hotel had a licence, so it outcompeted Jitaring, causing Kulin's continual development and hindering Jitarning's growth.
