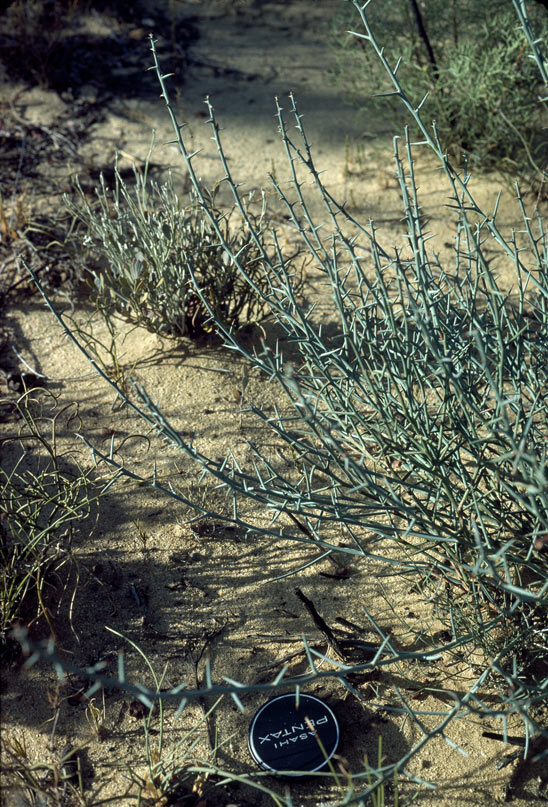
- Subspecies redacta near Yellowdine

Scientific classification
- Kingdom: Plantae
- Clade: Tracheophytes
- Clade: Angiosperms
- Clade: Eudicots
- Clade: Rosids
- Order: Fabales
- Family: Fabaceae
- Subfamily: Faboideae
- Genus: Daviesia
- Species: D. sarissa

Binomial name
- Daviesia sarissa Crisp

= Daviesia sarissa =

Species of legume

Daviesia sarissa is a species of flowering plant in the family Fabaceae and is endemic to inland areas of south-western Western Australia. It is a spreading or sprawling, glaucous shrub with scattered, long, rigid, cylindrical, sharply-pointed phyllodes, and orange-yellow and red flowers.

== Description ==
Daviesia sarissa is a spreading or sprawling, glabrous, glaucous shrub that typically grows up to 50 cm (20 in) high and 80 cm (31 in) wide. Its phyllodes are scattered, rigid, cylindrical, 10–80 mm (0.39–3.15 in) long, 1–2 mm (0.039–0.079 in) wide and fiercely pointed. The flowers are arranged in a group of three to six in leaf axils on a peduncle about 1 mm (0.039 in) long, the rachis 1–3 mm (0.039–0.118 in) long, each flower on a pedicel 0.5–3 mm (0.020–0.118 in) long. The sepals are 2.5–3.5 mm (0.098–0.138 in) long and joined at the base, the two upper lobes joined for most of their length, the lower three with lobes about 0.5 mm (0.020 in) long. The standard petal is broadly elliptic, 5.5–7 mm (0.22–0.28 in) long, 5.5–6.5 mm (0.22–0.26 in) wide, and orange-yellow with a dark red base. The wings are 4–5 mm (0.16–0.20 in) long and red, the keel 3.5–4.5 mm (0.14–0.18 in) long and red. Flowering occurs from July to September and the fruit is a triangular pod 7–8 mm (0.28–0.31 in) long.

== Taxonomy ==
Daviesia sarissa was first formally described in 1995 by Michael Crisp in Australian Systematic Botany from specimens he collected near Lake Chidnup, north-west of Ravensthorpe in 1975. The specific epithet (sarissa) is a word meaning a long Macedonian lance, referring to the leaves.

In the same paper, Crisp described two subspecies of D. sarissa and the names are accepted by the Australian Plant Census:

- Daviesia sarissa subsp. redacta Crisp;
- Daviesia sarissa Crisp subsp. sarissa Crisp differs from subsp. redacta in having bracts that do not overlap or hide the inflorescence, but are long, the flowers usually smaller.

== Distribution and habitat ==
This daviesia grows in heath. Subspecies redacta occurs between Southern Cross and Coolgardie in the Coolgardie biogeographic region, and subp. sarissa between Pingaring, Newdegate and near Lake King in the Esperance Plains and Mallee bioregions of south-western Western Australia.

== Conservation status ==
Daviesia sarissa is listed as "not threatened" by the Government of Western Australia Department of Biodiversity, Conservation and Attractions, but subspecies redacta is classified as "Priority Two", meaning that it is poorly known and from only one or a few locations.
