= Culen =

Culen may refer to:

- Culén, 10th-century Scottish king
- Culen, a surname; notable people with the name include:
  - Monica Culen, Austrian businesswoman and philanthropist

== See also ==
- Cullen (disambiguation)
- Culin (disambiguation)
- Kulen
