= Cullens =

Cullens may refer to:

== People ==
- Alan Cullens, a British politician; see Lancashire County Council elections
- Iain Cullens Forsyth, a British politician; see 2017 Highland Council election
- Lynne Cullens (born 1964), British Anglican bishop
- Magdalene "Magda" Cullens, a British politician; see 2004 Chorley Borough Council election

=== Fictional characters ===
- Phillip "Chozen" Cullens, the titular character from the animated TV show Chozen
- The Cullen vampire clan ("The Cullens") from the Young Adult fantasy franchise Twilight'; see List of Twilight characters

== Places ==
- Leaffony River, County Sligo, Ireland; also known as the Cullens River

== Other uses ==
- Cullens, a UK convenience shop, a subsidiary of Tesco; see List of convenience shops in the United Kingdom

== See also ==
- Cullen (disambiguation)
