= Bendering, Western Australia =

Bendering
- Town
- Interactive map of Bendering
- Coordinates: 32°52′S 117°09′E
- Country: Australia
- State: Western Australia
- LGA: Shire of Kondinin
- Location: 291 km (181 mi) east of Perth; 12 km (7.5 mi) north of Kondinin
- Established: 1921

Government
  - State electorate: Wagin
  - Federal division: O'Connor
- Elevation: 306 m (1,004 ft)
- Postcode: 6367

Bendering is a town located between Kondinin and Narembeen in the eastern Wheatbelt region of Western Australia.

The town was gazetted in 1921. The name of the town is taken from a nearby spring and is Aboriginal in origin; its meaning is unknown. Bendering was a stop on the Merredin to Yilliminning railway line.

The surrounding areas produce wheat and other cereal crops. The town is a receival site for Cooperative Bulk Handling.
