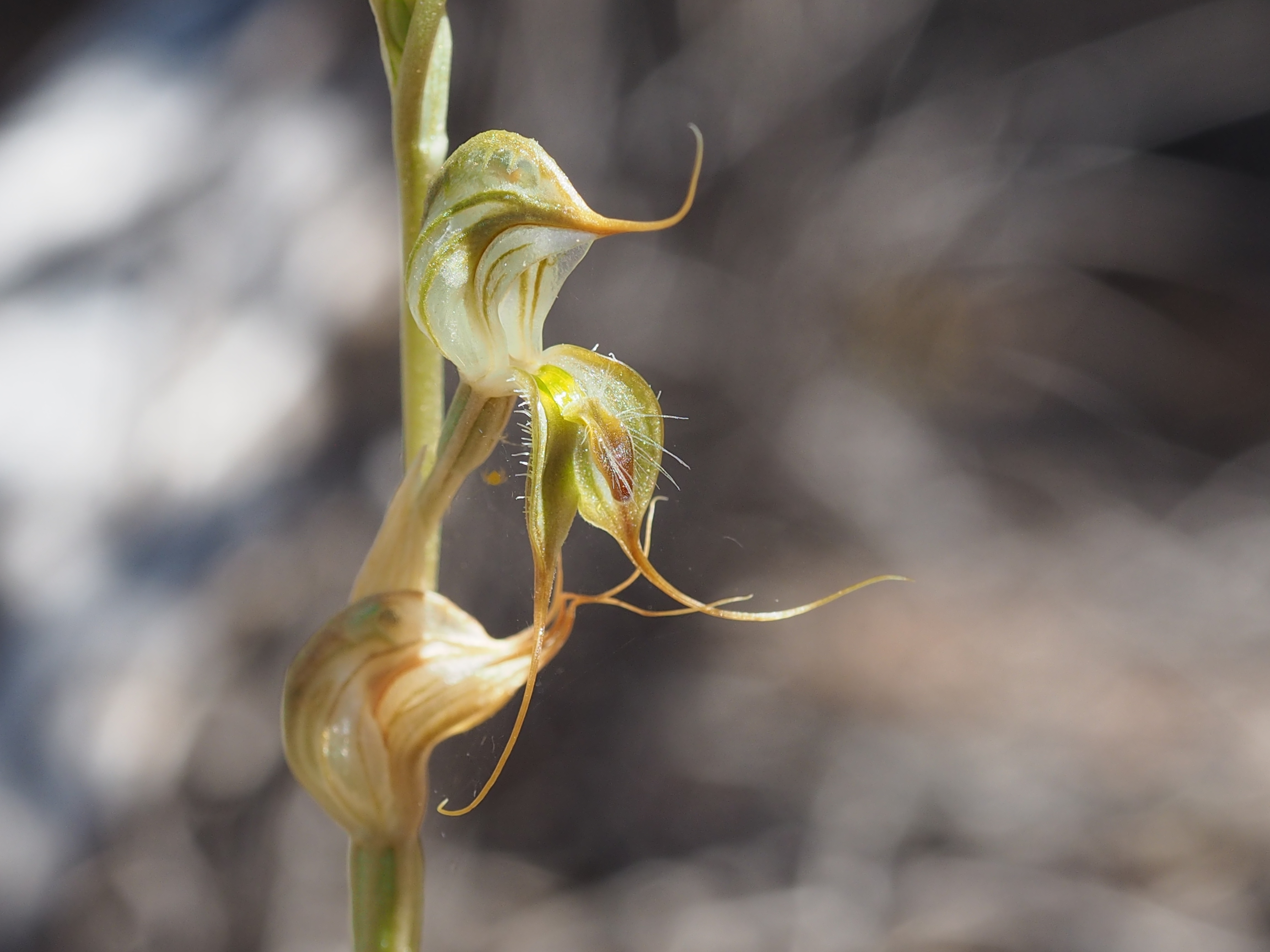
- Pterostylis roensis, east of Kondinin

Scientific classification
- Kingdom: Plantae
- Clade: Tracheophytes
- Clade: Angiosperms
- Clade: Monocots
- Order: Asparagales
- Family: Orchidaceae
- Subfamily: Orchidoideae
- Tribe: Cranichideae
- Genus: Pterostylis
- Species: P. roensis

Binomial name
- Pterostylis roensis D.L.Jones & M.A.Clem.

Synonyms
- Oligochaetochilus roensis (M.A.Clem.) Szlach.

= Pterostylis roensis =

Rufous greenhood

Species of orchid

Pterostylis roensis, commonly known as the painted rufous greenhood or dark rustyhood is a plant in the orchid family Orchidaceae and is endemic to the south-west of Western Australia. Both flowering and non-flowering plants have a relatively large rosette of leaves. Flowering plants also have up to six green or brown to blackish flowers with translucent white panels and a dark brown, fleshy, insect-like labellum.

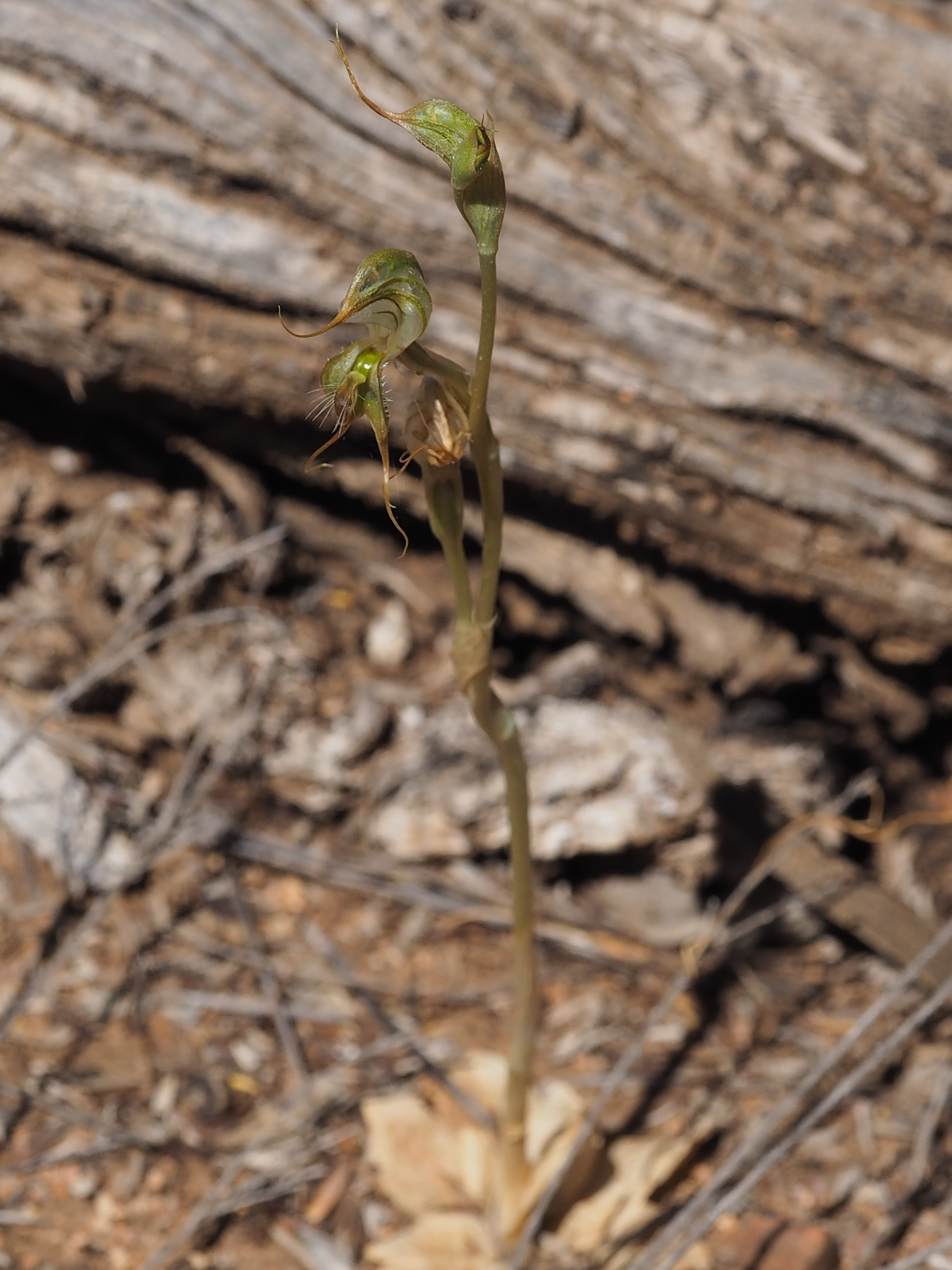
whole plant in the Kalgarin Nature Reserve

== Description ==
Pterostylis roensis is a terrestrial, perennial, deciduous, herb with an underground tuber and a rosette of between six and eleven leaves. The leaves are 15–45 mm (0.6–2 in) long and 5–18 mm (0.2–0.7 in) wide. Flowering plants have a rosette at the base of the flowering stem but the leaves are usually withered by flowering time. Up to six green or brown to blackish flowers with translucent white panels and 24–27 mm (0.9–1 in) long and 6–9 mm (0.2–0.4 in) wide are borne on a flowering stem 150–300 mm (6–10 in) tall. The dorsal sepal and petals form a hood or "galea" over the column with the dorsal sepal having a narrow tip 3–5 mm (0.1–0.2 in) long. The lateral sepals turn downwards, about the same width as the galea and suddenly taper to narrow tips 6–10 mm (0.2–0.4 in) long which spread apart from each other. The labellum is dark brown, thick, fleshy and insect-like, about 5 mm (0.2 in) long and 2 mm (0.08 in) wide. The "head" end of the labellum has a few short hairs and there are six to nine longer bristles on each side of the "body". Flowering occurs from September to November.

== Taxonomy and naming ==
Pterostylis roensis was first formally described in 1989 by David Jones and Mark Clements from a specimen collected south of Norseman and the description was published in Australian Orchid Research. The specific epithet (roensis) refers to the Roe botanical district where this greenhood is common.

== Distribution and habitat ==
The rufous greenhood grows in woodland, shrubland and in shallow soil on granite outcrops between Hyden and Balladonia in the Avon Wheatbelt, Coolgardie and Mallee biogeographic regions.

== Conservation status ==
Pterostylis roensis is classified as "not threatened" by the Western Australian Government Department of Parks and Wildlife.
