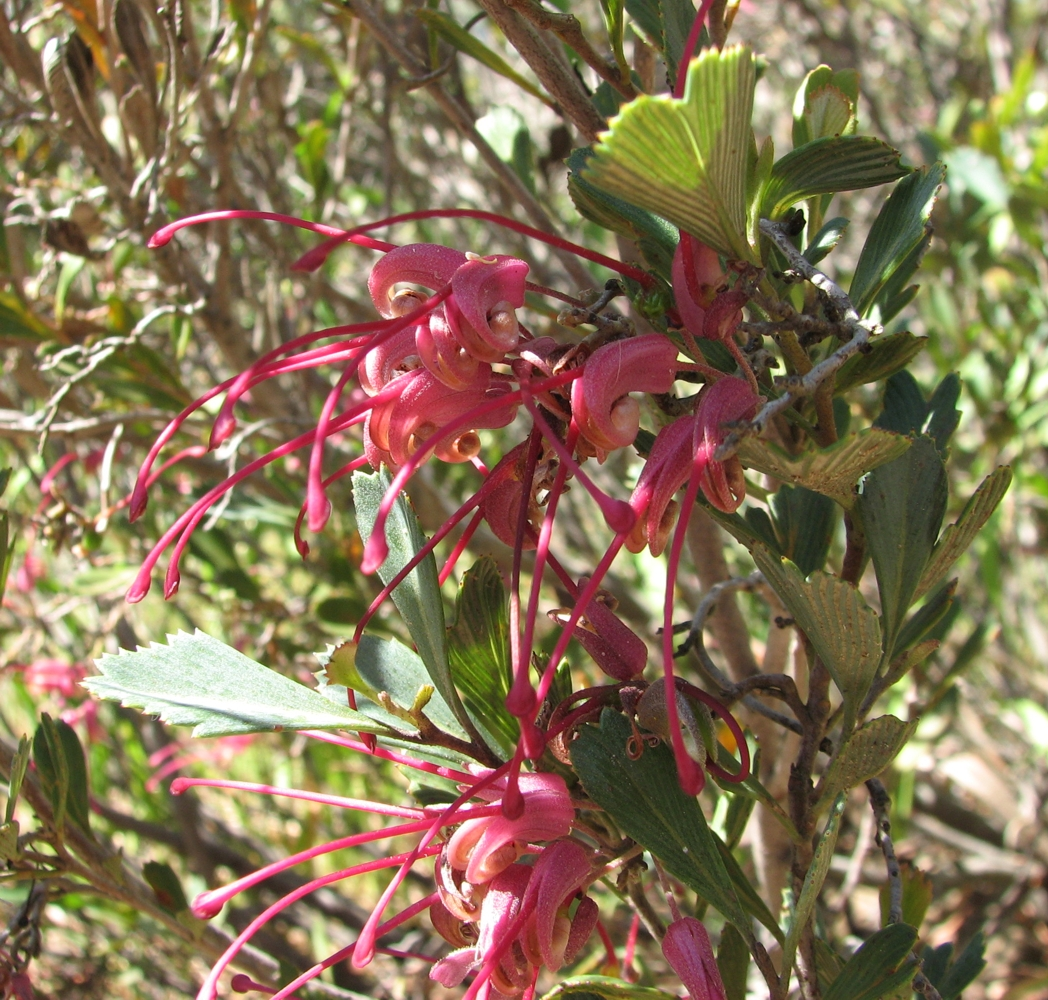

Scientific classification
- Kingdom: Plantae
- Clade: Tracheophytes
- Clade: Angiosperms
- Clade: Eudicots
- Order: Proteales
- Family: Proteaceae
- Genus: Grevillea
- Species: G. pectinata

Binomial name
- Grevillea pectinata R.Br.

Synonyms
- Grevillea ctenophylla Meisn.

= Grevillea pectinata =

Species of shrub endemic to Western Australia

Grevillea pectinata, commonly known as comb-leaf grevillea, is a species of flowering plant in the family Proteaceae and is endemic to the south of Western Australia. It is a spreading shrub with divided, comb-like leaves and mauve-pink to red and cream-coloured to yellow flowers with a red to deep pink style.

== Description ==
Grevillea pectinata is spreading shrub that typically grows to a height of 0.5–2.5 m (1 ft 8 in – 8 ft 2 in) and sometimes forms a lignotuber. Its leaves are 15–60 mm (0.59–2.36 in) long, 7–25 mm (0.28–0.98 in) wide and oblong to egg-shaped in outline, pinnatipartite to pinnatisect with 8 to 24 lobes sharply-pointed, linear lobes 3–22 mm (0.12–0.87 in) long and 0.8–1.6 mm (0.031–0.063 in) wide, the lobes sometimes almost touching. The edges of the lobes are more or less rolled under, enclosing most of the lower surface. The flowers are arranged singly or in clusters of up to 10 flowers on a rachis 1–5 mm (0.039–0.197 in) long, the pistil 27–37 mm (1.1–1.5 in) long. The flowers are mauve-pink to red and cream-coloured to yellow, the style red to deep pink. Flowering occurs from June to January and the fruit is an erect, glabrous follicle 8–11 mm (0.31–0.43 in) long with prominent horns or ridges.

== Taxonomy ==
Grevillea pectinata was first formally described by botanist Robert Brown in 1830 in Supplementum primum prodromi florae Novae Hollandiae. The specific epithet (pectinata) means "in the form of a comb", referring to the leaves.

== Distribution and habitat ==
Comb-leaf grevillea grows in mallee scrub, heath or low woodland in near-coastal areas of southern Western Australia from the Stirling Range to near Esperance and inland as far as Kulin and Lake King in the Esperance Plains and Mallee bioregions.

== Conservation status ==
This grevillea is listed as "not threatened" by the Government of Western Australia Department of Biodiversity, Conservation and Attractions.
