= Karlgarin, Western Australia =

Karlgarin
- Town
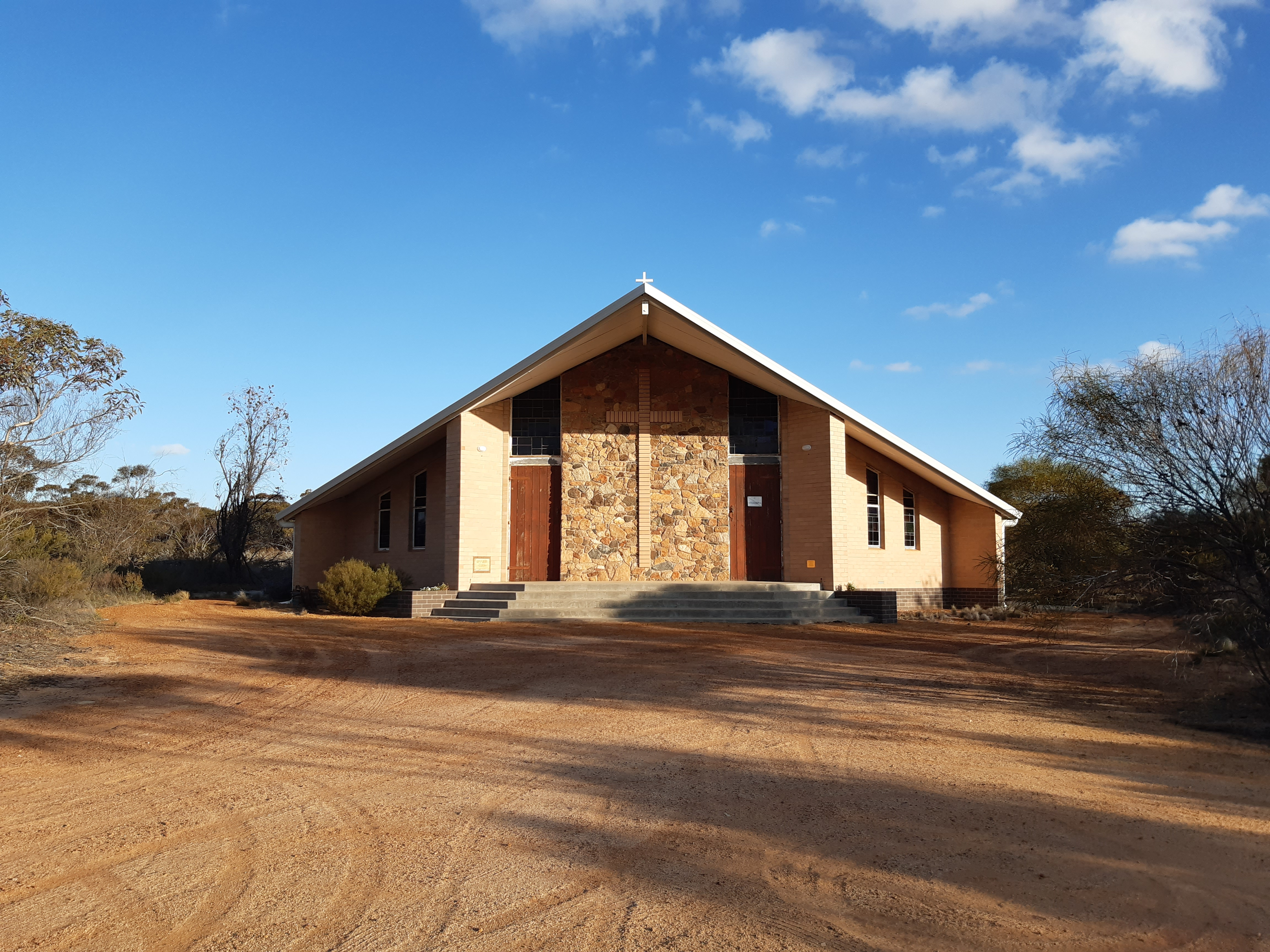
- Church of Our Lady Help of Christians, Karlgarin

- Interactive map of Karlgarin
- Coordinates: 32.497°S 118.71°E
- Country: Australia
- State: Western Australia
- LGA: Shire of Kondinin
- Location: 321 km (199 mi) south east of Perth; 42 km (26 mi) east of Kondinin; 71 km (44 mi) north of Lake Grace
- Established: 1931

Government
  - State electorate: Wagin
  - Federal division: O'Connor

Area
  - Total: 1,048.5 km^{2} (404.8 sq mi)
- Elevation: 308 m (1,010 ft)

Population
  - Total: 105 (SAL 2021)
- Postcode: 6358

Karlgarin is a town located 321 kilometres (199 mi) south-east of Perth in the eastern Wheatbelt region of Western Australia. A small traditional farming town, in 2010 Karlgarin made national papers, as the poorest town in Western Australia, with an average of $34,054 taxable income.

The first European to visit the area was Surveyor General John Septimus Roe, who passed through in 1848. He recorded the name "Carlgarin" as the name of a nearby hill. the town name, Karlgarin, was derived from the Noongar word, karl, meaning fire. Karlgarin was selected as a soldier settlement site and a declaration of a townsite was sought in 1924. The townsite was gazetted in 1931. The Hyden railway line opened in 1933.

== Economy ==
According to 2011 census data, 57.3% of Karlgarin residents are employed in sheep, beef cattle and grain farming. The surrounding areas also produce wheat and other cereal crops.

== Facilities ==
Karlgarin townsite has an abandoned school and shop, both of which were destroyed during a storm in 2013. The main hub of the community is the Karlgarin Country Club, established in 1953.

The Church of Our Lady Help of Christians Catholic Church, which sustained major roof damage in the 2013 storm, was fully restored and re-blessed by Archbishop Timothy Costelloe in April 2016 to celebrate its 50th anniversary. It was noted that local farmers who originally built the church in 1966 were instrumental in its repair.

== Tourism ==
Karlgarin is home to the annual gilgie races. The town's proximity to Hyden and Wave Rock, along with its location on the Brookton Highway, means reliable tourism potential. To capitalise on this, the Trestrail family opened Tressie's Museum and Caravan Park.

== Sport ==
Karlgarin has a small cricket oval, used by the combined Karlgarin and Pingaring cricket team. The town also shares a football team with Hyden, the Hyden/Karlgarin Football Club, which competes in the Eastern Districts Football League, and hockey and netball team shares a hockey team, both shared with Hyden.

== 2013 storm ==
A freak storm swept through the town 16 January 2013, with heavy rain and winds of 90 kilometres per hour (56 mph). Only 25 millimetres (1 in) of rain fell but trees were uprooted and roofs were torn off buildings, including the local school, general store and church. Twelve buildings were damaged and the town has never fully recovered.
