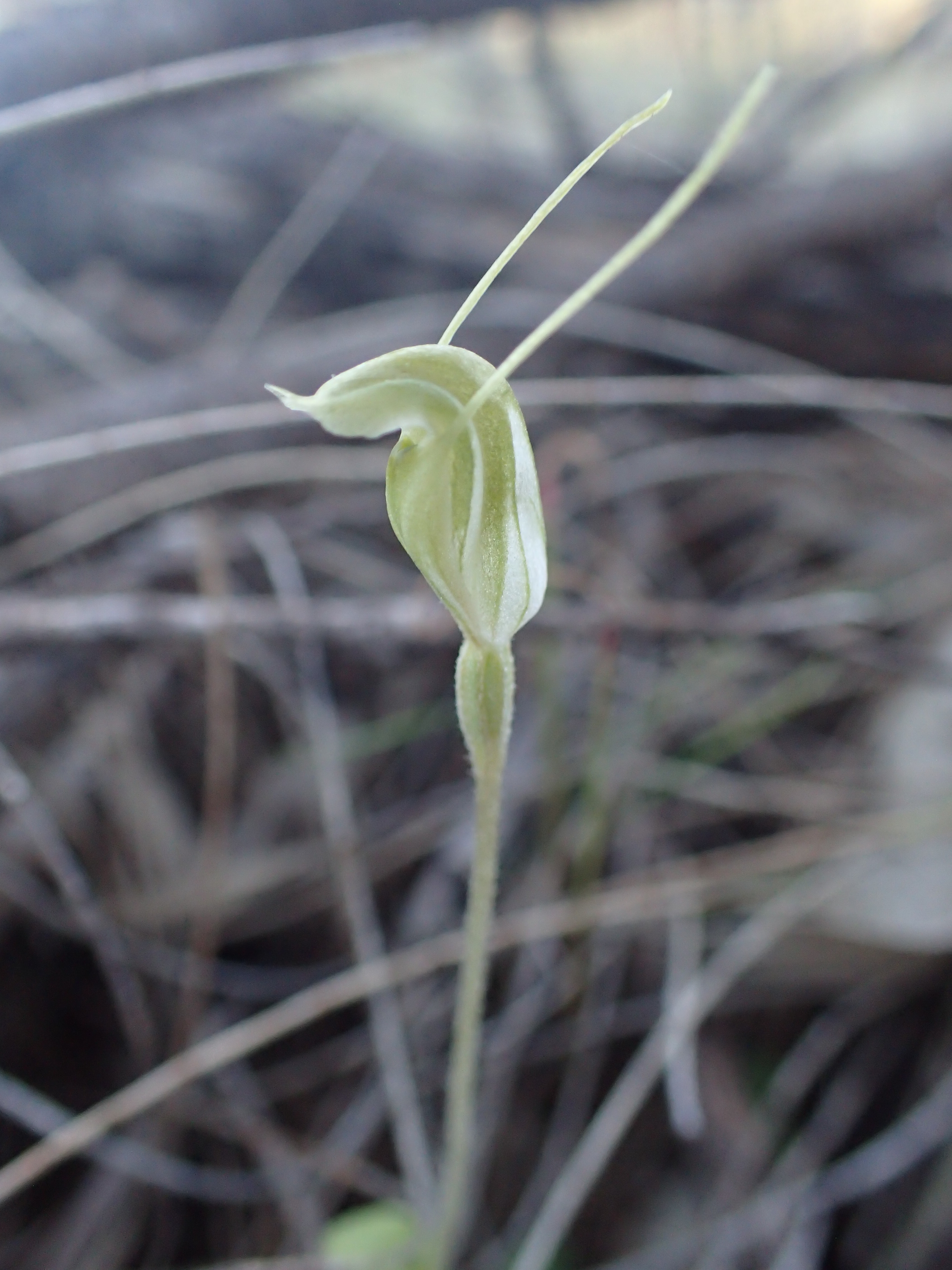
- Pterostylis echinulata growing in Beverley

Conservation status
- Priority One — Poorly Known Taxa (DEC)

Scientific classification
- Kingdom: Plantae
- Clade: Tracheophytes
- Clade: Angiosperms
- Clade: Monocots
- Order: Asparagales
- Family: Orchidaceae
- Subfamily: Orchidoideae
- Tribe: Cranichideae
- Genus: Pterostylis
- Species: P. echinulata

Binomial name
- Pterostylis echinulata D.L.Jones & C.J.French

= Pterostylis echinulata =

Hairy-leafed snail orchid

Species of orchid

Pterostylis echinulata, commonly known as the hairy-leafed snail orchid, is a species of orchid endemic to the south-west of Western Australia. Both flowering and non-flowering plants have a compact rosette of leaves flat on the ground and flowering plants have a single pale yellowish-green flower.

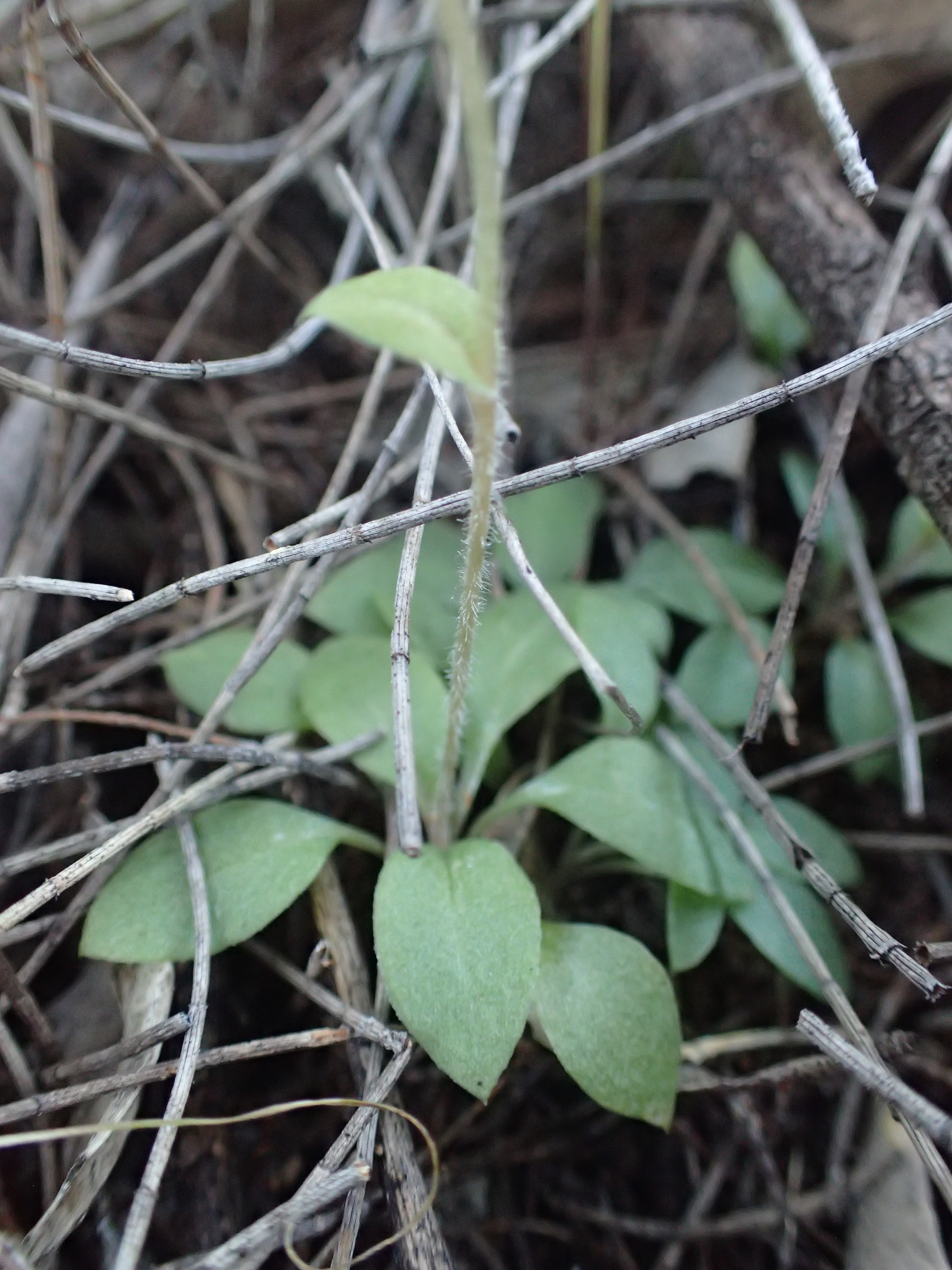
rosette and hairy stem

== Description ==
Pterostylis echinulata is a terrestrial, perennial, deciduous, herb with an underground tuber and a compact rosette of leaves 5–20 mm (0.2–0.8 in) in diameter. Flowering plants have a single pale yellowish-green flower 9–11 mm (0.4–0.4 in) long and 5–8 mm (0.2–0.3 in) wide on a densely hairy flowering stem 40–80 mm (2–3 in) high. There is a single stem leaf 6–8 mm (0.2–0.3 in) long and 3–4 mm (0.1–0.2 in) wide on the flowering stem. The dorsal sepal and petals are fused, forming a slightly inflated hood or "galea" over the column. The lateral sepals are held close to the galea almost closing the front of the flower and have erect, thread-like tips 14–17 mm (0.6–0.7 in) long. The labellum is broad but not visible from outside the flower. Flowering occurs in June and July.

== Taxonomy and naming ==
Pterostylis echinulata was first formally described in 2014 by David Jones and Christopher French from a specimen collected near Kulin and the description was published in Australian Orchid Review. The species had previously been known as Pterostylis sp. 'hairy leaf'. The specific epithet (echinulata) is a Latin word meaning "with very small prickles, alluding to the impression imparted by the siliceous cells present on the leaves, scape and ovary of this species".

== Distribution and habitat ==
The hairy-leafed snail orchid grows under small shrubs in open woodland in the Mallee biogeographic region.

== Conservation ==
Pterostylis echinulata is classified as "Priority One" by the Western Australian Government Department of Parks and Wildlife, meaning that it is known from only one or a few locations which are potentially at risk.
