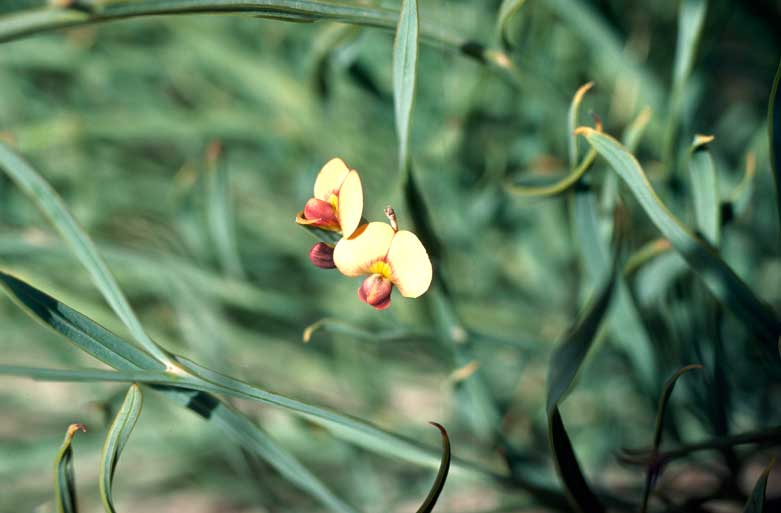
- Between Tarin Rock and Lake Grace

Conservation status
- Priority Three — Poorly Known Taxa (DEC)

Scientific classification
- Kingdom: Plantae
- Clade: Tracheophytes
- Clade: Angiosperms
- Clade: Eudicots
- Clade: Rosids
- Order: Fabales
- Family: Fabaceae
- Subfamily: Faboideae
- Genus: Daviesia
- Species: D. implexa

Binomial name
- Daviesia implexa Crisp

Synonyms
- Davies elongata subsp. implexa Crisp

= Daviesia implexa =

Species of flowering plant

Daviesia implexa is a species of flowering plant in the family Fabaceae and is endemic to the south-west of Western Australia. It is a mound-shaped shrub with many tangled stems, scattered linear phyllodes and yellow or apricot-coloured, reddish-brown and yellowish-green flowers.

== Description ==
Daviesia implexa is a mound-shaped shrub that typically grows up to 1 m (3 ft 3 in) and 2 m (6 ft 7 in) wide and that has many tangled, glabrous branchlets with ridged or winged branchlets. Its phyllodes are scattered, linear but twisted, 5–100 mm (0.20–3.94 in) long and 2–5 mm (0.079–0.197 in) long. The flowers are arranged in groups of two or three in leaf axils, each flower on a pedicel 2.5–6 mm (0.098–0.236 in) long with bracts 1.5–2.0 mm (0.059–0.079 in) long at the base. The sepals are joined at the base, the upper two lobes joined for most of their length and the lower three pointed. The standard petal is elliptic, 10.0–11.5 mm (0.39–0.45 in) long and yellow or apricot-coloured with a reddish-brown ring around a yellowish-green base, the wings 8.5–11 mm (0.33–0.43 in) long, red and yellow, and the keel is about 6.5 mm (0.26 in) long and yellow. Flowering occurs from September to January and the fruit is a flattened triangular pod 15–17 mm (0.59–0.67 in) long.

== Taxonomy and naming ==
This species was first formally described in 1995 by Michael Crisp and given the name Daviesia elongata subsp. implexa in Australian Systematic Botany from specimens collected near Lake Grace in 1983. In 2017, Crisp raised the subspecies to species status as Daviesia implexa in the journal Phytotaxa. The specific epithet (implexa) means "interwoven or entwined".

== Distribution and habitat ==
Daviesia implexa grows in kwongan between Kulin and Hyden in the Coolgardie, Jarrah Forest and Mallee regions of south-western Western Australia.

== Conservation status ==
Daviesia implexa is classified as "Priority Three" by the Government of Western Australia Department of Biodiversity, Conservation and Attractions, meaning that it is poorly known and known from only a few locations but is not under imminent threat.
