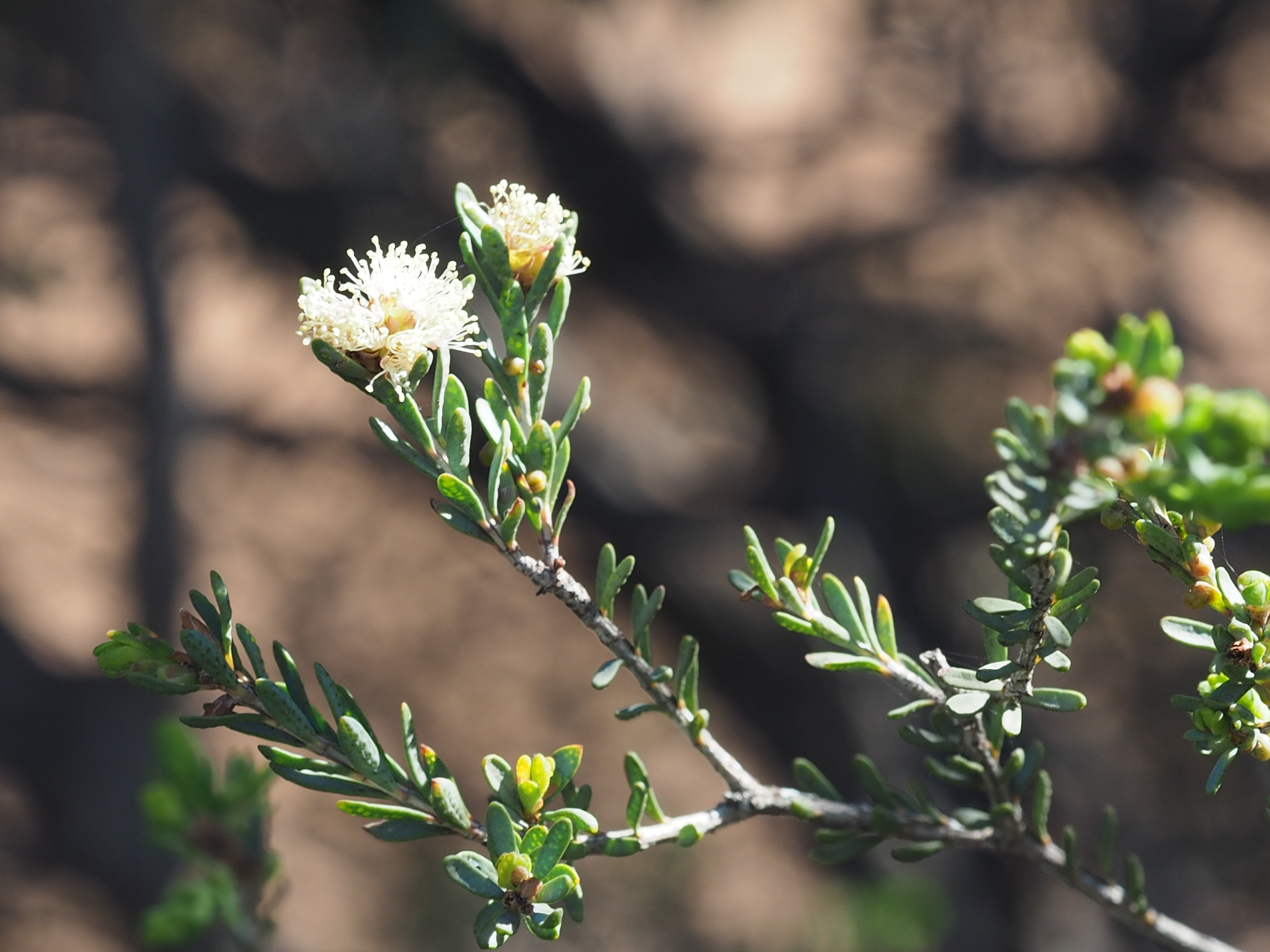

Conservation status
- Least Concern (IUCN 3.1)

Scientific classification
- Kingdom: Plantae
- Clade: Embryophytes
- Clade: Tracheophytes
- Clade: Spermatophytes
- Clade: Angiosperms
- Clade: Eudicots
- Clade: Rosids
- Order: Myrtales
- Family: Myrtaceae
- Genus: Melaleuca
- Species: M. phoidophylla

Binomial name
- Melaleuca phoidophylla Barlow ex Craven

= Melaleuca phoidophylla =

Species of flowering plant

Melaleuca phoidophylla is a plant in the myrtle family, Myrtaceae and is endemic to the south-west of Western Australia. It is distinguished by its leaf arrangement, small raised blisters on the leaves and heads of white or cream flowers on the ends of the branches in spring.

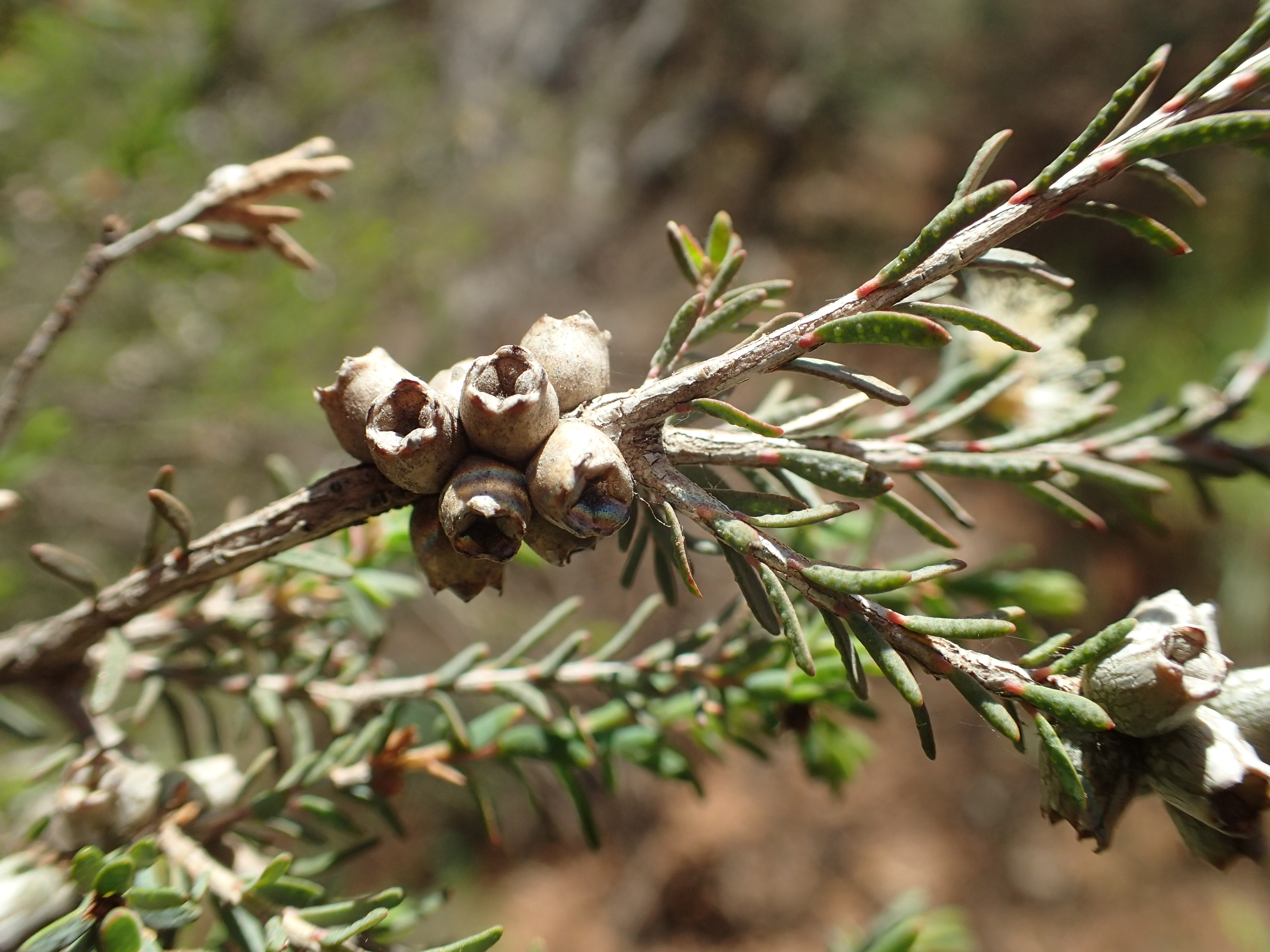
Fruit

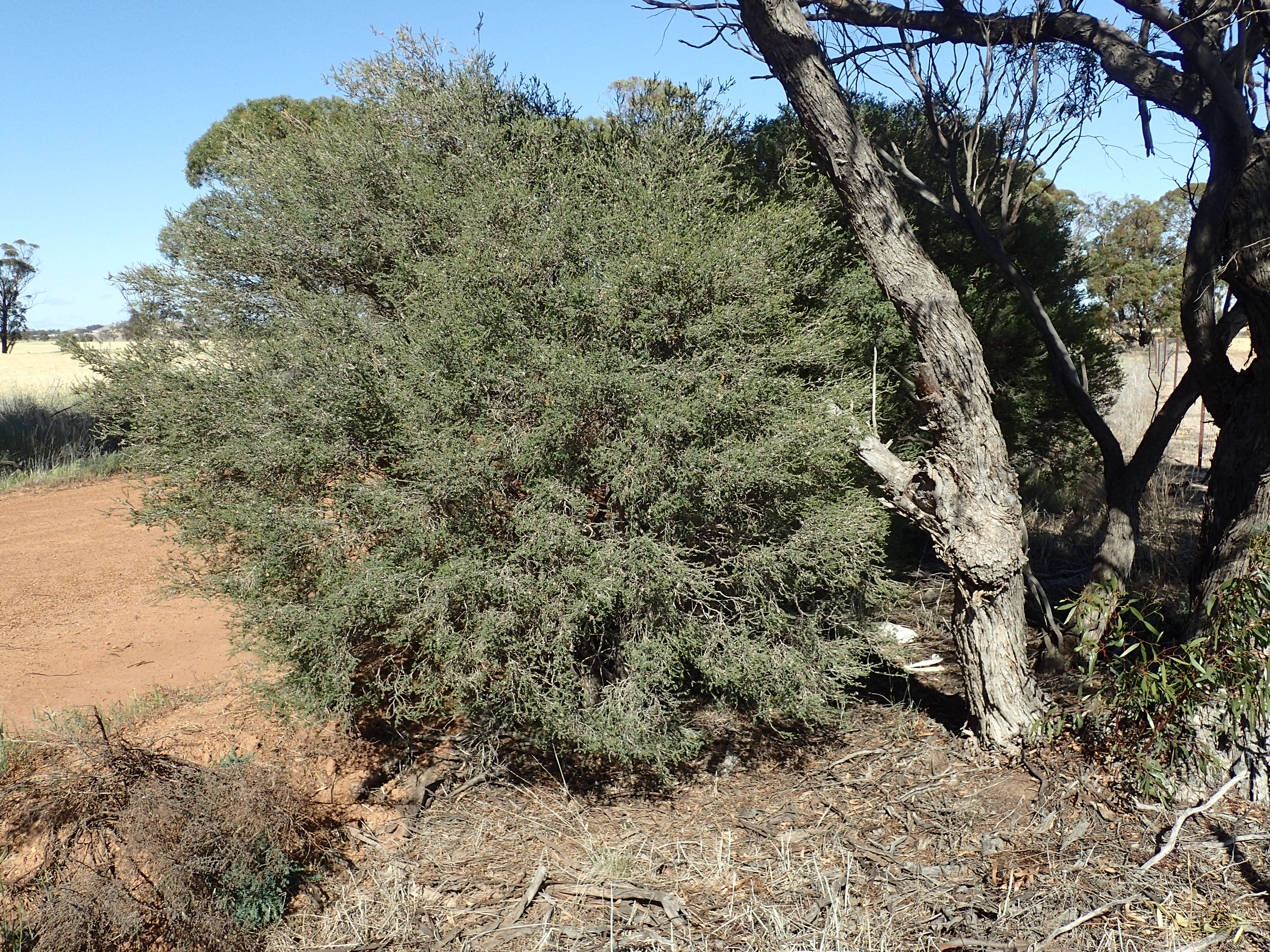
Habit near Bruce Rock

== Description ==
Melaleuca phoidophylla is a shrub sometimes growing to 6 m (20 ft) tall. Its leaves are arranged in rings of three around the stem and are 3–7.6 mm (0.1–0.3 in) long, 0.9–1.6 mm (0.04–0.06 in) wide, linear to narrow egg-shaped and with a rounded end. The leaves have small blisters and in cross section are crescent moon-shaped to semicircular.

The flowers are cream to white, sometimes pinkish and arranged in heads on the ends of branches which continue to grow after flowering. The heads are up to 15 mm (0.6 in) in diameter with 3 to 18 individual flowers. The petals are 1.3–2 mm (0.05–0.08 in) long and fall off as the flower matures. There are five bundles of stamens around the flower, each with 7 to 11 stamens. Flowering occurs from September to November, and is followed by fruit which are woody, cup-shaped capsules, 1.8–2 mm (0.07–0.08 in) long in clusters along the stem.

== Taxonomy and naming ==
Melaleuca phoidophylla was first formally described in 1999 by Lyndley Craven in Australian Systematic Botany from a specimen collected near Pingaring. The specific epithet (phoidophylla) is derived from ancient Greek words phois meaning "blister" and phyllon meaning "leaf", referring to the raised blisters on the leaves of this species.

== Distribution and habitat ==
This melaleuca occurs in and between the Katanning, Boorabbin and Salmon Gums districts in the Avon Wheatbelt, Coolgardie, Mallee and Murchison biogeographic regions. It grows in sandy or clayey soils near lakes and areas that are seasonally flooded.

== Conservation ==
Melaleuca phoidophylla is listed as not threatened by the Government of Western Australia Department of Parks and Wildlife.
