= Acacia repanda =

Conservation status
- Priority Three — Poorly Known Taxa (DEC)

Scientific classification
- Kingdom: Plantae
- Clade: Tracheophytes
- Clade: Angiosperms
- Clade: Eudicots
- Clade: Rosids
- Order: Fabales
- Family: Fabaceae
- Subfamily: Caesalpinioideae
- Clade: Mimosoid clade
- Genus: Acacia
- Species: A. repanda

Binomial name
- Acacia repanda R.S.Cowan & Maslin
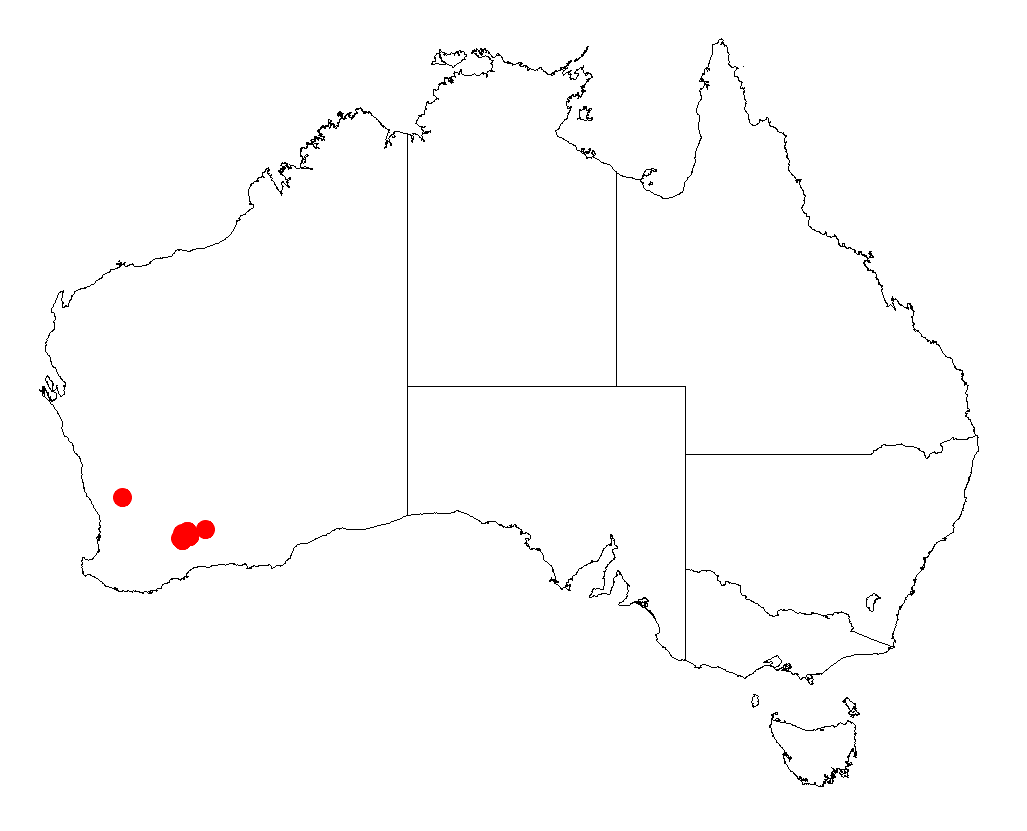
- Occurrence data from AVH

Species of legume

Acacia repanda is a shrub belonging to the genus Acacia and the subgenus Juliflorae that is endemic to a small area in western Australia.

== Description ==
The rounded to obconic shrub typically grows to a height of 0.5 to 2 metres (2 to 7 ft). The single stemmed and multi-branched plant has minni-ritchi bark and branchlets that have spreading hairs. Like most species of Acacia it has phyllodes rather than true leaves. The patent to ascending evergreen phyllodes are terete to flat with a linear to linear-oblanceolate shape that is slightly to moderately incurved. The rigid, glabrous and grey-green coloured phyllodes have a length of 2.5 to 6 cm (0.98 to 2.36 in) and a width of 1 to 3 mm (0.039 to 0.118 in) have eight prominent nerves with deep furrows between each nerve. It blooms from June to August producing yellow flowers. The simple inflorescences occur in pairs in the axils with sessile and spherical to broadly ellipsoid shaped flowerheads with a length of 5 to 8 mm (0.20 to 0.31 in) and a diameter of 4 to 5 mm (0.16 to 0.20 in) containing 20 to 25 golden coloured flowers. After flowering coriaceous seed pods with a narrowly oblong shape form that are strongly undulate. The pods have a length of up to around 3 cm (1.2 in) and a width of around 4 mm (0.16 in) and are shaggy with golden or white hairs and some smaller red resin-hairs throughout. The glossy dark-brown to black seeds are also sometimes mottled yellow have a broadly elliptic to oblong-ovate shape and are 2.5 to 3 mm (0.098 to 0.118 in) in length.

== Distribution ==
It is native to a small area in the southern Wheatbelt region of Western Australia where it has a disjunct distribution with the bulk of the population being found in the area around Holt Rock with a small population found in Wongan Hills. It is often situated around outcrops of granite growing in sandy loam or loamy soils as a part of heath or shrubland communities.

== See also ==
- List of Acacia species
