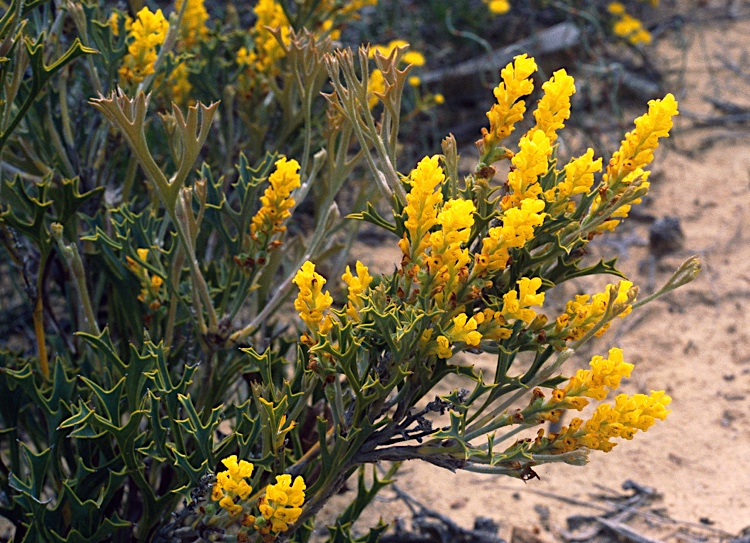
- 36 km (22 mi) east of Lake Grace

Conservation status
- Priority Three — Poorly Known Taxa (DEC)

Scientific classification
- Kingdom: Plantae
- Clade: Tracheophytes
- Clade: Angiosperms
- Clade: Eudicots
- Order: Proteales
- Family: Proteaceae
- Genus: Synaphea
- Species: S. bifurcata

Binomial name
- Synaphea bifurcata A.S.George

= Synaphea bifurcata =

Species of Australian shrub in the family Proteaceae

Synaphea bifurcata is a flowering plant in the family Proteaceae and is endemic to the south-west of Western Australia. It is a bushy shrub with hairy branchlets, bifurcated leaves with arched lobes, spike of crowded yellow flowers, and narrowly elliptic fruit covered with soft hairs.

== Description ==
Synaphea bifurcata is a bushy, branched shrub that typically grows to a height of up to 50 cm (20 in) and has soft hairs pressed against the surface. The leaves are twice bifurcated, 10–30 mm (0.39–1.18 in) long and 25–80 mm (0.98–3.15 in) wide on a petiole 20–40 mm (0.79–1.57 in) long, the lobes arched and more or less flat. The end lobes are linear to more or less triangular, with a blunt tip 1–2.5 mm (0.039–0.098 in) long and an impressed midrib on the lower surface. The flowers are yellow and borne on crowded spikes up to 150 mm (5.9 in) long, on a peduncle 5–30 mm (0.20–1.18 in) long with spreading, egg-shaped bracts. The perianth has a narrow opening, the upper tepal 3.0–3.5 mm (0.12–0.14 in) long and about 1.3 mm (0.051 in) wide, the lower tepal 2.5 mm (0.098 in) long. Flowering occurs from September to November, and the fruit is narrowly elliptic, about 4 mm (0.16 in) long and covered with soft hairs.

== Taxonomy ==
Synaphea bifurcata was first formally described in 1995 by the botanist Alex George in the Flora of Australia from specimens he collected 14 km (8.7 mi) north of the Newdegate-Lake King road on the Holt Rock South road in 1994. The specific epithet (bifurcata) means 'two-forked'.

== Distribution and habitat ==
This species of Synaphea grows in clay-loam or sand over laterite in kwongan from Newdegate to Lake King in the Mallee bioregion of south-western Western Australia.

== Conservation status ==
Synaphea bifurcata is listed as "Priority Three" by the Government of Western Australia Department of Biodiversity, Conservation and Attractions, meaning that it is poorly known and known from only a few locations but is not under imminent threat.
