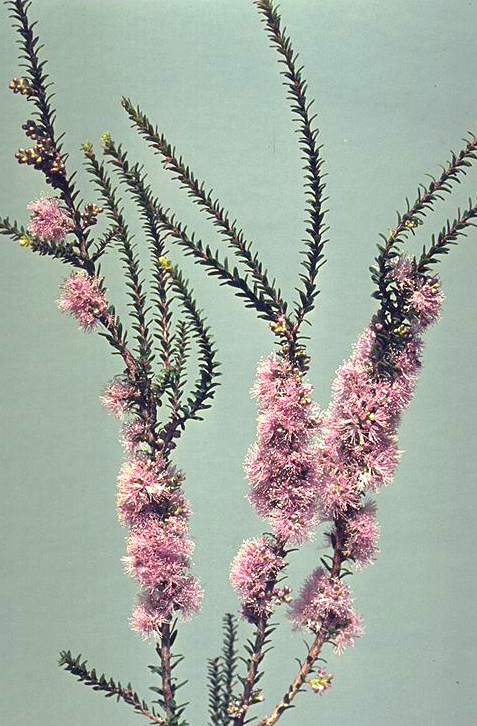

Scientific classification
- Kingdom: Plantae
- Clade: Tracheophytes
- Clade: Angiosperms
- Clade: Eudicots
- Clade: Rosids
- Order: Myrtales
- Family: Myrtaceae
- Genus: Melaleuca
- Species: M. depauperata

Binomial name
- Melaleuca depauperata Turcz.

Synonyms
- Melaleuca elachophylla F.Muell.; Myrtoleucodendron depauperatum (Turcz.) Kuntze; Myrtoleucodendron elachophyllum (F.Muell.) Kuntze

= Melaleuca depauperata =

Species of shrub

Melaleuca depauperata is a shrub in the myrtle family, Myrtaceae and is endemic to the south-west of Western Australia. It has small, fleshy leaves and purple to pink flowers on short stalks along the branches.

== Description ==
Melaleuca depauperata is dense, bushy, spreading shrub growing to about 2 m (7 ft) high and wide with fibrous bark. Its leaves are arranged alternately around the stem and are 1.8–5 mm (0.07–0.2 in) long and 1.0–3.0 mm (0.04–0.1 in) wide, flat but rather fleshy and oval shaped, usually with a blunt end but sometimes with a sharp point.

The flowers are mauve, pink or violet in spikes of between 4 and 17 individual flowers which fade to white as they age. The spikes are in the leaf axils, have a short stalk and are about 15 mm (0.6 in) in diameter. Flowering occurs from September to January but mainly between October and November. The fruit are almost spherical woody capsules 3.4 mm (0.1 in) long in loose clusters.

== Taxonomy and naming ==
This species was first formally described in 1852 by the Russian botanist Nikolai Turczaninow in Bulletin de la Classe physico-mathématique de l'Académie impériale des sciences de Saint-Pétersbourg. The specific epithet (depauperata) is from the Latin depauperatus, possibly referring to the type specimen having few flowers.

== Distribution and habitat ==
Melaleuca depauperata occurs inland from the Stirling Range as far as Wagin and eastwards as far as Muntadgin and the Peak Charles National Park in the Avon Wheatbelt, Coolgardie, Esperance Plains and Mallee biogeographic regions. It grows on sandy and clayey soils on flats and roadsides.

== Conservation status ==
Melaleuca depauperata is listed as not threatened by the Government of Western Australia Department of Parks and Wildlife.
