= Muntadgin, Western Australia =

Muntadgin
- Town
- Interactive map of Muntadgin
- Coordinates: 31.767°S 118.55°E
- Country: Australia
- State: Western Australia
- LGA: Shire of Merredin
- Location: 293 km (182 mi) east of Perth; 56 km (35 mi) SE of Merredin
- Established: 1925

Government
  - State electorate: Central Wheatbelt
  - Federal division: Durack

Area
  - Total: 262.2 km^{2} (101.2 sq mi)
- Elevation: 347 m (1,138 ft)

Population
  - Total: 39 (SAL 2021)
- Postcode: 6420

Muntadgin is a townsite off the Great Eastern Highway on Brissenden Road, located between the towns of Bruce Rock and Southern Cross in the Wheatbelt region of Western Australia. At the 2021 census, Muntadgin had a population of 39.

Originating as a railway siding on the Merredin to Yilliminning railway line, the location was thought by the district surveyor to be ideal for a townsite. The townsite was surveyed and gazetted in 1925.

A hotel licence was granted in 1931 to Colin Elliott to run the hotel that had recently been built in the town.

The name is Aboriginal in origin and is taken from the nearby Muntadgin Soak, which first appeared on maps of the area in 1912.

The town still has a wheat siding, the Muntadgin hotel that provides meals and accommodation, and recreation facilities, including a golf course. The town celebrated its 75th anniversary in 2005. The surrounding areas produce wheat and other cereal crops. The town has been a receival site for the CBH Group since 1940.
