= Dudinin, Western Australia =

Town in Wheatbelt region, Western Australia

Dudinin
- Town
- Interactive map of Dudinin
- Coordinates: 32.9525°0′S 118.0044°0′E
- Country: Australia
- State: Western Australia
- LGA: Shire of Kulin
- Location: 270.3 km (168.0 mi) SE of Perth
- Established: 1915

Area
  - Total: 396.8 km^{2} (153.2 sq mi)
- Elevation: 345 m (1,132 ft)

Population
  - Total: 72
  - Density: 0.1815/km^{2} (0.470/sq mi)
- Postcode: 6363

Dudinin is a small remote town located in the Shire of Kulin in Western Australia, with a population of 72.

== Location ==
Dudinin is located 37 kilometres southeast of the town of Kulin in the Weatbelt region of southeast WA.

== History ==
On 23 April 1915, Dudinin was founded in preparation for a proposed railway that would travel southeast from Narrogin through Yilliminning. It would run through Dudinin in preference to Wogalin. The railway line was taken over by the government on 15 March 1915 and the line opened on 16 March.

Many businesses relocated from Wogalin to Dudinin, resulting in Dudinin's substantial growth. Wogalin School was dismantled and relocated to Dudinin in 1921.

The government water scheme allowed water from Wellington Dam Hydro Power Station in Collie to be pumped and used in Dudinin in 1970, and in 1973 electricity was provided to the town.
