= Culin =

Culin may refer to:

- Culin, Isère, a commune in France
- Curtis G. Culin (1915–1963), American soldier and inventor
- Stewart Culin (1858–1929), American ethnographer and author

== See also ==
- Cullin, a family of proteins
- Cuillin, a mountain range in Scotland
- Culine, a village in Serbia
- Culen (disambiguation)
- Kulin (disambiguation)
- Qulin, a town in the United States
