= Kullen =

Kullen may refer to:

- Kullen, a promontory in Sweden, the site of Kullen Lighthouse
- Kullen Knoll, in Antarctica
- Kullen, a surname; people with the name include:
  - Bob Kullen
  - Nicole Kullen
  - Sue Kullen

== See also ==
- King Kullen, American supermarket chain
- Kulen
- Cullen (disambiguation)
