= Cullen Washington Jr. =

American painter (born 1972)

- Born: 1972 (age 53–54); Alexandria, Louisiana, U.S.
- Education: Louisiana State University (BFA), School of the Museum of Fine Arts at Tufts (MFA)
- Occupation: Painter
- Style: Abstraction

Cullen Washington Jr. (born 1972) is an African-American contemporary abstract painter. Washington lives in New York.

== Early life and education ==
Cullen Washington Jr. was born in Alexandria, Louisiana in 1972. As a child, he loved science, but also knew he wanted to be an artist at a young age. He grew up in a very supportive environment, where not only his parents but his two sisters encouraged him to develop his artistic skills. At the age of 9, he presented his first art exhibition at his elementary school in Alexandria, which made his interest in art grow even more rapidly.

He earned his MFA degree from Tufts University/School of the Museum of Fine Arts Boston, and BFA degree from Louisiana State University.

== Career ==
=== Exhibitions ===
His work has been exhibited at The Studio Museum in Harlem, The Contemporary Arts Museum Houston, Saatchi Gallery in London, and the Museum of Science and Industry in Chicago.

From January to March 2020, the University of Michigan Museum of Art exhibited Washington's work in a show titled Cullen Washington, Jr.: The Public Square. Though scheduled to be active through May, the exhibition was cut short when the museum closed in mid-March due to the COVID-19 pandemic. Consequently, the museum put Washington's work on their website as an online exhibition.

=== Artist residencies ===
Washington has been an artist in residence at Amherst College (2016–17), the Fountainhead Residency (2016), The Studio Museum in Harlem (2013); Rush Arts Gallery (2012), Yaddo (2011), and Skowhegan School of Painting and Sculpture (2010).

== Artistic style ==
Washington's paintings often utilize materials such as "tape, canvas, acrylic paint, charcoal dust, Black chalkboard paint, paper, Black copier toner, acrylic medium, Black ink, Kraft paper, wax coated cotton string, latex house paint, rubber, wire, hot plastic glue and ear phone cushions." He describes his work as "non-representational."
