= Monica Culen =

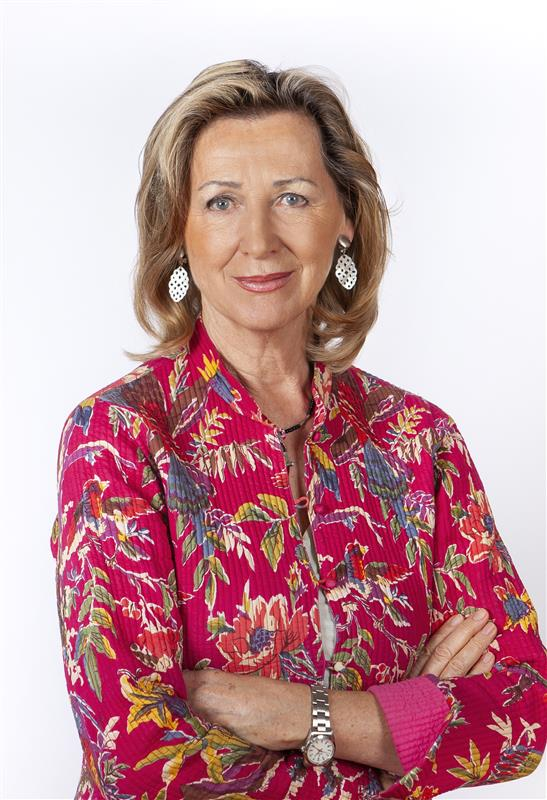
- Monica Culen
- Born: Monica E. Culen; Vienna, Austria
- Occupations: Business woman, philanthropist
- Years active: 1972 - present
- Known for: Founder of RED NOSES International
- Title: Former CEO & Chair of RED NOSES International President of RED NOSES Board of Trustees
- Spouse: Stefan Culen (m. 1970)
- Children: 3

Signature
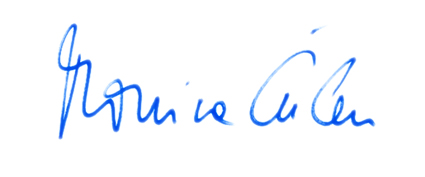

Monica Culen is an Austrian founder and advocate for humanitarian causes. In 1991, Culen helped create one of the first European hospital clown organisations. In 1994 she founded RED NOSES in Austria, developing during 30 years a professional Healthcare Clown Program and escalating it internationally to 11 more countries and worldwide Emergency Missions. Today RED NOSES International is the world's largest healthcare clowning organisation.

In 2023 Culen stepped down from the Management Board and is now presiding the Board of Trustees and still serves on the boards of directors for various RED NOSES organisations.

Between 2004 and 2021 Culen served as President of the Austrian Fundraising Association. For her contributions to Austrian society, Culen has received the Golden Medal of Merit of the Republic of Austria [Goldenes Ehrenzeichen für Verdienste um die Republik Österreich] for her social services. She also served as chairwoman of the board for the European Federation of Hospital Clown Organisations from 2010 to 2020.

== Early life ==
Monica Culen was born in Vienna on February 10, 1948. She is a descendant of the Fischer-Pochtler industrial family. She is the daughter of Marietta Fischer Pochtler and Hannes Folter. Culen grew up in an entrepreneurial family, getting familiar with managerial responsibilities. Her brother, Christian Pochtler, is now CEO and owner of the Pochtler Industrieholding and iSi Group.

== Professional background ==
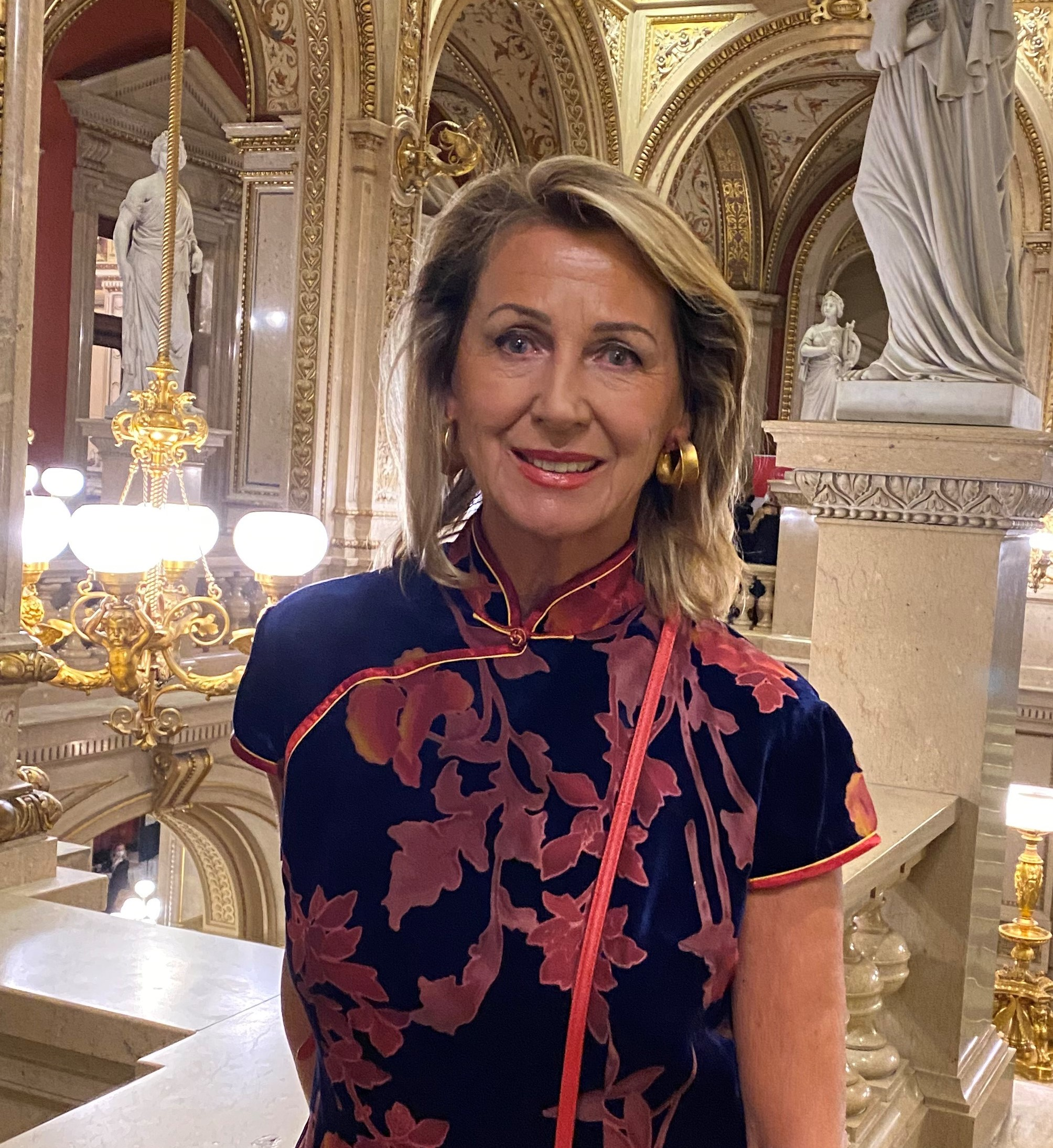
Monica Culen (2022)

=== Early career ===
Monica Culen started her career as a chief hostess at the 1972 Summer Olympics in Munich. In 1974, she worked at the Institut Europeen d'Administration des Affairs (INSEAD) at Fontainebleau in France as a public relations assistant throughout the academic year of 1974–75.

In 1976, Culen was hired as the public relations and protocol officer at the newly established OPEC Fund for International Development. She oversaw the organisation's intergovernmental relations as well as the regular convening and organisation of ministerial conferences in Vienna, Africa and South America.

=== Hospital clowning ===
In 1991, Culen co-founded one of the first European hospital clowning projects, Cliniclowns Österreich, and helped develop the strategic concepts and guidelines for such organizations in Austria, Netherlands and Belgium.

In 1994, Culen founded the non-profit organisation ROTE NASEN Clowndoctors Österreich [RED NOSES Clowndoctors Austria]. Culen served as Managing Director until 2011, when she subsequently became President of the Board.

In 2003, Culen and Giora Seeliger, along with additional support from Franz Haimerl, created RED NOSES Clowndoctors International. Since 1996, RED NOSES opened partner organisations in Germany, Hungary, Slovakia, Slovenia, Czech Republic, Croatia, Poland, Lithuania as well as branch offices in Jordan and Palestine. Furthermore, RED NOSES Clowndoctors International undertakes humanitarian missions through the Emergency Smile programme in crisis areas, refugee camps and other institutions worldwide. RED NOSES Group is the leading Healthcare Clown Organisation.

In April 2023 Monica Culen stepped down from the Management Board and is presently presiding the RED NOSES Board of Trustees and serves at the RNI Executive Committee as well as on various local Boards of Directors of Partner Organizations.

== Other associations ==
Monica Culen was appointed as president of the Austrian Fundraising Association [Fundraising Verband Austria] in 2004. The FVA is a platform for non-profit organizations to support and professionalize NPOs and help influence the formulation of relevant legislation concerning the non-profit sector in Austria.

Culen is also the co-founder and former Chair (2011 to 2021) of the European Federation of Healthcare Clowns (EFHCO), the world's largest federation of hospital clown organisations. The federation defines binding quality requirements for the work of hospital clowns in order to professionalize their engagement with their beneficiaries and to define standards for a future certification.

From 2002 until 2008, Culen developed and was in charge of the first Austrian fundraising college. She was also a lecturer at the Fundraising School of the University of Indiana (USA).
