= Kulin (surname) =

Kulin is a surname. Notable people with the surname include:

- Ayşe Kulin (born 1941), Turkish novelist, screenwriter, and columnist
- Ban Kulin (1163–1204), Bosnian monarch
- György Kulin (1905–1989), Hungarian astronomer
