= Leaffony River =

River in County Sligo, Ireland

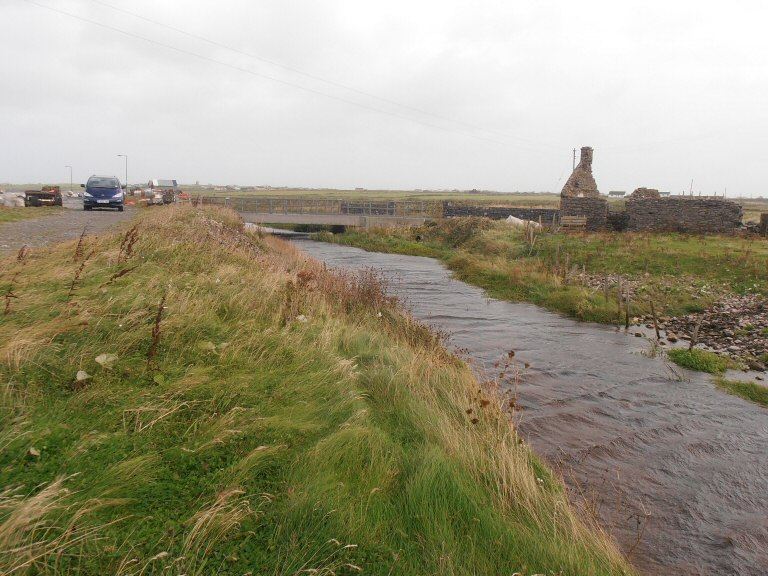
- Bridge over River Leaffony

Physical characteristics
- Source
  - coordinates: c. 54.165°N 8.972°W
- Mouth
  - location: Killala Bay
  - coordinates: 54.2672°N 9.0623°W
- Length: c. 15 kilometres (9.3 mi) (Note: Length is approximate with a likely +/- 3km tolerance)
- Basin size: 35 km^{2} (14 sq mi)

The Leaffony River is a small river that runs through County Sligo in Ireland. It is sometimes known as the Cullens River.

The 12.8 km (8 mi) river originates in County Sligo and empties into the Atlantic Ocean at Pollacheeny Harbour some 6 kilometres (3.7 mi) from Enniscrone on the west side of Killala Bay. (Note: Pollacheeny Harbour is also referred to as Pullaheeney Harbour)

There are claims that the river may previously have been known as the Geloir, meaning clear and mentioned several times in old records of Sligo.
