= Shire of Kondinin =

- Local government area
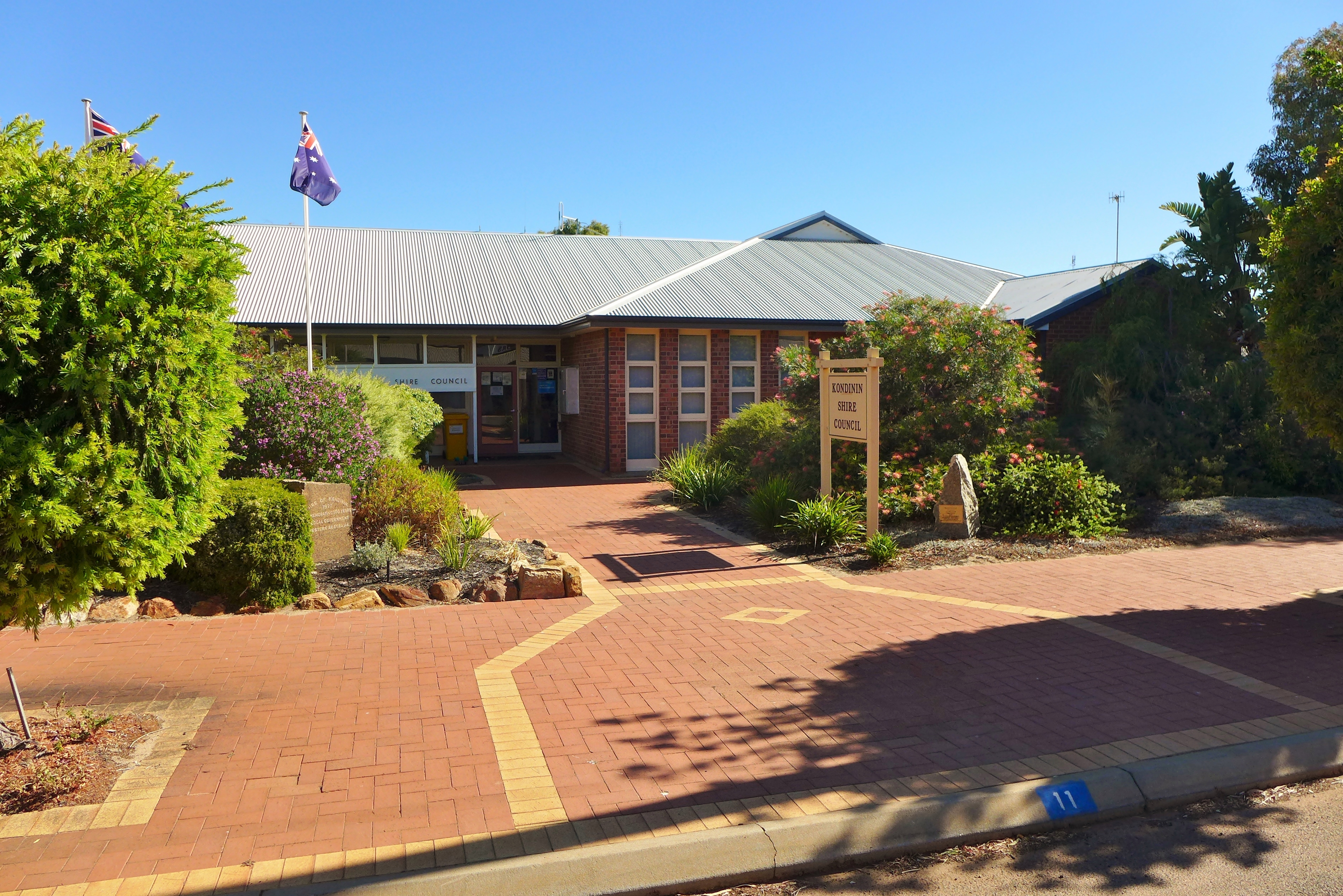
- Kondinin shire offices, 2014

- Interactive map of Shire of Kondinin
- Country: Australia
- State: Western Australia
- Region: Wheatbelt
- Established: 1925
- Council seat: Kondinin

Government
  - Shire President: Kent Mouritz
  - State electorate: Roe
  - Federal division: O'Connor

Area
  - Total: 7,376 km^{2} (2,848 sq mi)

Population
  - Total: 847 (LGA 2021)
- Website: Shire of Kondinin
LGAs around Shire of Kondinin
Narembeen	Yilgarn	Coolgardie
Corrigin	Shire of Kondinin	Dundas
Wickepin	Kulin	Ravensthorpe

The Shire of Kondinin is a local government area in the eastern Wheatbelt region of Western Australia, about 300 kilometres (186 mi) east of the state capital, Perth. The Shire's land area of 7,376 square kilometres (2,848 sq mi) forms a narrow east-west band, located between the Shire of Narembeen to the north and the Shire of Kulin to the south. Its seat of government is the town of Kondinin.

== History ==
The Kondinin Road District was gazetted on 15 May 1925, separating the district from the Roe Road District with effect from 1 July in that year. The first election was held on 5 September 1925, with the first meeting taking place seven days later.

It was declared a shire with effect from 1 July 1961 following the passage of the Local Government Act 1960, which reformed all remaining road districts into shires.

== Wards ==
The shire was previously divided into four wards; however, these were abolished in 2004. All eight councillors sit at large.

== Towns and localities ==
The towns and localities of the Shire of Kondinin with population and size figures based on the most recent Australian census:

Locality	Population	Area	Map
Forrestania	28 (SAL 2021)	3,187.9 km^{2} (1,230.9 sq mi)	
Hyden	384 (SAL 2021)	2,024.8 km^{2} (781.8 sq mi)	
Karlgarin	105 (SAL 2021)	1,048.5 km^{2} (404.8 sq mi)	
Kondinin	332 (SAL 2021)	1,165.4 km^{2} (450.0 sq mi)	

== Former towns ==
- Bendering

== Notable councillors ==
- Bill Young, Shire of Kondinin councillor 1954–1967, shire president 1959–1967; later a state MP

== Heritage-listed places ==
As of 2023, 179 places are heritage-listed in the Shire of Kondinin, of which one is on the State Register of Heritage Places, the Hyden CWA Rooms.

Place name	Place #	Street name	Suburb or town	Co-ordinates	Built	State registered	Notes & former names	Photo
Hyden CWA Rooms	10930	1 Marshall Street	Hyden	32.449033°S 118.864958°E	1950	23 January 2004		
