= Cullen Hightower =

American quotation and quip writer

Cullen Hightower (December 17, 1923 – November 27, 2008) was a well-known quotation and quip writer from the United States.

Hightower served in the U.S. army during World War II before beginning a career in sales. He began to publish his writing upon retirement. A collection of his quotations was published as Cullen Hightower's Wit Kit. One of Hightower's most notable quotations is "People seldom become famous for what they say until after they are famous for what they've done."
