= Merredin to Yilliminning railway line =

Railway line in Western Australia

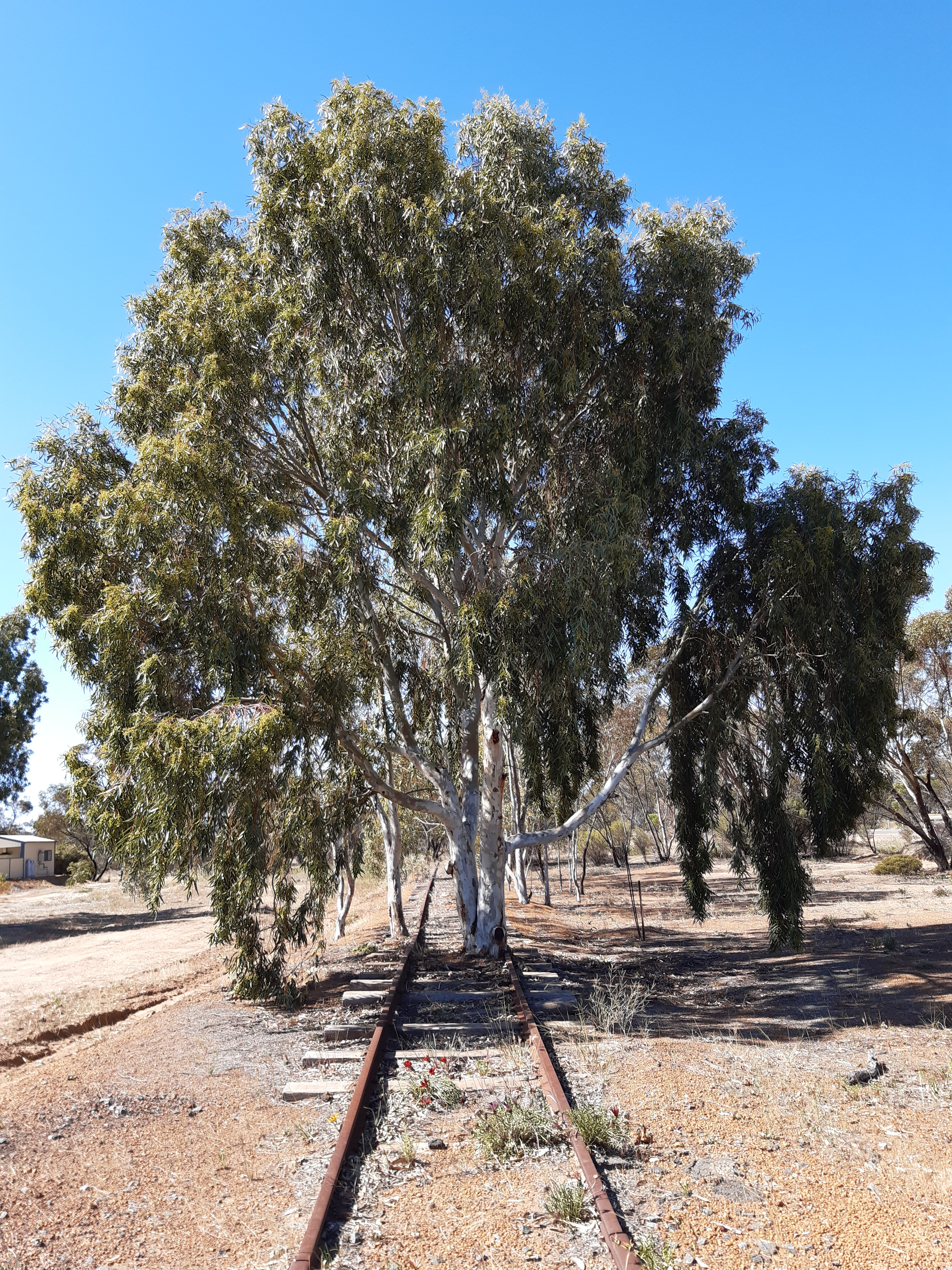
- A tree growing on the railway line at Kulin

Overview
- Status: Closed
- Locale: Wheatbelt, Western Australia
- Termini: Merredin; Yilliminning

Service
- Operator(s): Western Australian Government Railways

History
- Commenced: 1912
- Opened: 16 March 1925
- Section 1 opened: Yilliminning to Kondinin: 15 March 1915
- Section 2 opened: Kondinin to Narembeen: 22 December 1917
- Section 3 opened: Narembeen to Merredin: 16 March 1925

Technical
- Line length: 260 km (160 mi)
- Track gauge: 1,067 mm (3 ft 6 in)
- Merredin to Yilliminning railway line Main locations

The Merredin to Yilliminning railway line was a railway line connecting Merredin to Yilliminning via Kondinin. Also known as the West Merredin to Yilliminning via Kondinin railway, it was 260 kilometres (160 mi) long. At its northern end, at Merredin, it connected to the Eastern Goldfields Railway while, at the southern terminus at Yilliminning, it connected to the Merredin to Narrogin railway line. From Yilliminning, this line continued to Narrogin, 23 kilometres (14 mi) further west, where the line intersected the Great Southern Railway.

== History ==
The Yillimining–Kodinin Railway Act 1911, an act by the Parliament of Western Australia granted assent on 9 January 1912, authorised the construction of the railway line from Yilliminning to Kondinin. A second act, the Yilliminning–Kondinin Railway Extension Act 1914, assented to in 18 February 1915, authorised the construction of the railway line extension from Kondinin to Merredin.

The railway line's contract for construction for the first section from Yilliminning to Kondinin was awarded on 23 October 1912 and the line officially opened on 15 March 1915. It was constructed by the Western Australian Public Works Department. The second section of the line, from Kondinin to Narembeen, had its contract awarded on 7 February 1917, was constructed that year and officially opened on 22 December 1917, again having been built by the Public Works Department. The final section of the railway from Narembeen to Merredin had its contract awarded on 11 June 1923 and was officially opened on 16 March 1925, having once more been constructed by the Public Works Department.

In 1954, the state government of Western Australia had compiled a list of loss-making railway operations, of which the Merredin to Yilliminning line was one, having had a total expenditure of almost four times its earnings in the financial year to June 1953. The line was broken down in the report in a northern and southern section, split at Kondinin. The northern section was more unprofitable than the southern one, recording £A 98,946 expenditure versus earnings of £A 25,882 while figures for the southern section were £A 84,261 versus £A26,965. With a recorded loss of £A 73,064, the northern section of the line was the worst of the 18 railway lines listed for unprofitability.

Arc Infrastructure deems the railway line to be part of its Grain Freight Rail Network, which, in 2017, accounted for 50 percent of its network but only 10 percent of its freight. The line south of Kulin and north of Kondinin was classified as Tier 3 while the section in between was not assessed.

In 2021, it was estimated that it would cost A$164.41 million to upgrade the Narrogin to Kulin section of the railway line to reopen it. Reopening the Kondinin to Merredin section was estimated to cost A$210.67 million, or A$238.08 to upgrade the line to standard gauge. The following year, in 2022, it was announced that the state government would spend A$72 million on the railway line from Narrogin to Kulin, nine years after its closure, in order to reopen the Narrogin to Tincurrin section.

== Legacy ==
The railway line, as well as the Merredin to Narrogin railway line running in parallel further west, still exist, but are designated as "Not in use" on the Arc Infrastructure map in 2024.

At the northern terminus, at Merredin, four entries related to the railways are on the State Register of Heritage Places: the Merredin Railway Station, the Railway Water Tank, the Railway Dam and the Railway Housing Precinct.

At Narembeen, the Narembeen Railway Precinct is on the Shire of Narembeen's heritage list and consists of a goods sheet and stationmasters house, among other installations.

The Kondinin Railway Precinct is on the heritage list of the Shire of Kondinin and consists of a Ladies Waiting Room and a goods shed.

In the Shire of Kulin, the railway facilities at Dudinin and Kulin are on the shire's heritage list.
