= Holt Rock, Western Australia =

Holt Rock
- Town
- Coordinates: 32.683°S 119.467°E
- Country: Australia
- State: Western Australia
- LGA(s): Shire of Kulin
- Location: 341 km (212 mi) east south east of Perth; 100 km (62 mi) ENE of Lake Grace
- Established: 1939

Government
  - State electorate(s): Central Wheatbelt
  - Federal division(s): O'Connor

Area
  - Total: 772.8 km^{2} (298.4 sq mi)
- Elevation: 323 m (1,060 ft)

Population
  - Total(s): 46 (SAL 2021)
- Postcode: 6355

Holt Rock is a small town in the Wheatbelt region of Western Australia. It is situated between the towns of Hyden and Varley close to the edge of Lake Hurlstone.

The town is named after the nearby geographical feature that was named by the explorer Frank Hann in 1901. Hann had been on an expedition from Ravensthorpe to Menzies. Hann is thought to have named the rock after the surveyor G.H. Holt who worked in the Lands Department. The townsite was gazetted in 1939.

The rocks serve to provide potable water for the town, with a 1,100-cubic-metre (250,000 imp gal) rock catchment tank built to collect run-off from the rocks.

Economically, the area depends on cropping of cereals, primarily wheat. The town is a receival site for Cooperative Bulk Handling. Bulk bins were established in the town in 1940.
