= Pingaring, Western Australia =

Pingaring
- Town
- Coordinates: 32°45′0″S 118°37′0″E
- Country: Australia
- State: Western Australia
- LGA(s): Shire of Kulin
- Location: 341 km (212 mi) east south east of Perth; 42 km (26 mi) north of Lake Grace; 45 km (28 mi) east of Kulin
- Established: 1963

Government
  - State electorate(s): Central Wheatbelt
  - Federal division(s): O'Connor

Area
  - Total: 877.6 km^{2} (338.8 sq mi)
- Elevation: 284 m (932 ft)

Population
  - Total(s): 60 (SAL 2021)
- Postcode: 6357

Pingaring is a small town in the Wheatbelt region of Western Australia.

The name of the town is the Indigenous Australian name of a nearby spring that was first recorded by surveyors in 1926. The town originated as a railway siding on the Hyden to Lake Grace railway line, with its location being decided in 1930. The townsite was gazetted in 1963.

The surrounding areas produce wheat and other cereal crops. The town is a receival site for Cooperative Bulk Handling.
