= Shire of Kulin =

Local government area in the Wheatbelt region of Western Australia

- Local government area
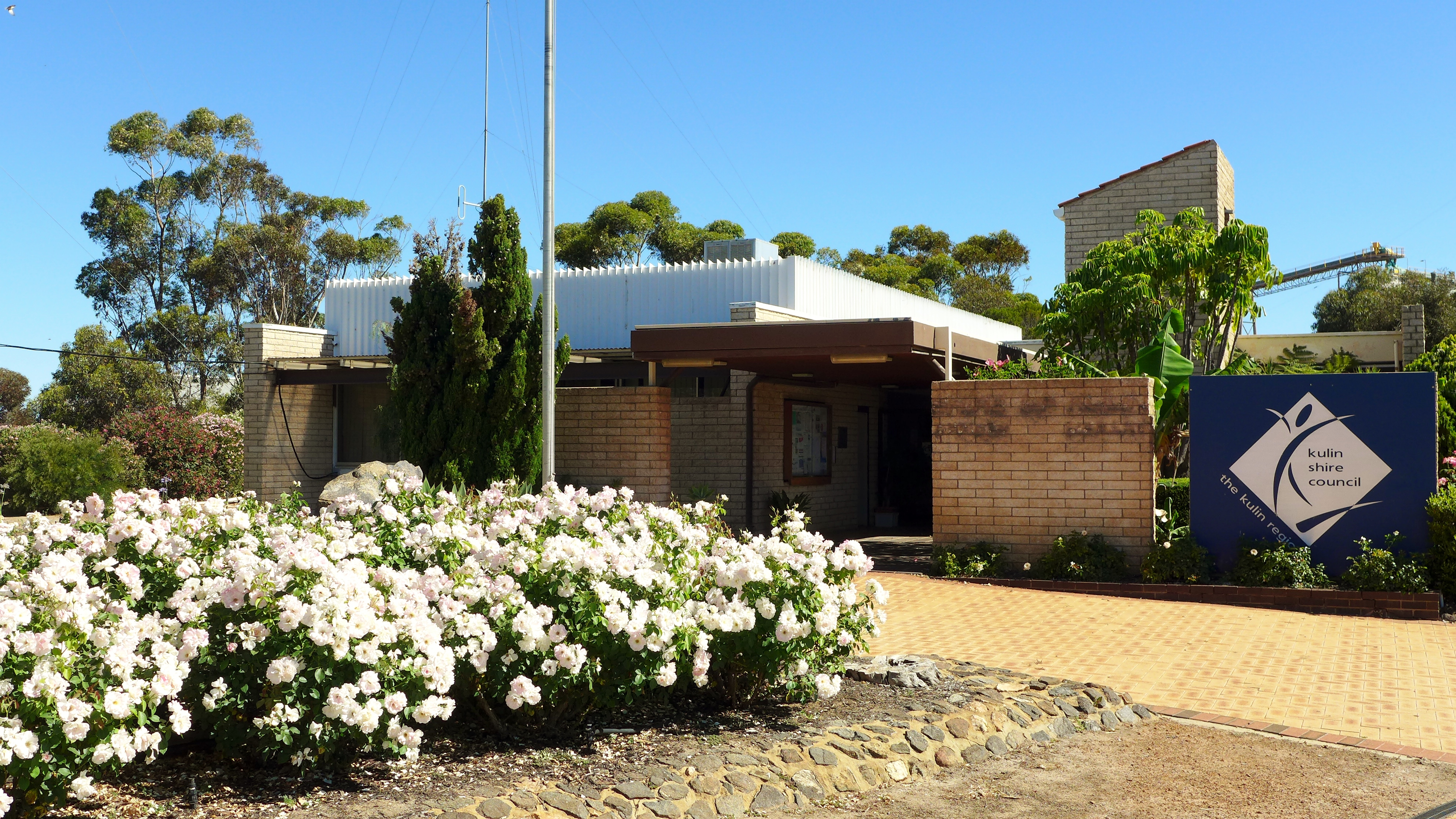
- Kulin shire offices, 2014

- Interactive map of Shire of Kulin
- Country: Australia
- State: Western Australia
- Region: Wheatbelt
- Established: 1918
- Council seat: Kulin

Government
  - Shire President: Barry West
  - State electorate: Central Wheatbelt
  - Federal division: O'Connor

Area
  - Total: 4,713.7 km^{2} (1,820.0 sq mi)

Population
  - Total: 769 (LGA 2021)
- Website: Shire of Kulin
LGAs around Shire of Kulin
Corrigin	Kondinin	Kondinin
Wickepin	Shire of Kulin	Dundas
Dumbleyung	Lake Grace	Ravensthorpe

The Shire of Kulin is a local government area in the eastern Wheatbelt region of Western Australia, about 300 kilometres (186 mi) ESE of the state capital, Perth. The Shire's land area of 4,714 square kilometres (1,820 sq mi) forms a narrow east-west band, located between the Shire of Kondinin to the north and the Shire of Lake Grace to the south. Its seat of government is the town of Kulin. The local economy is based on agriculture - predominantly cereal grains and sheep.

== History ==
On 14 June 1918, the Roe Road District was gazetted. It was renamed to the Kulin Road District on 12 March 1926. On 1 July 1961, it became a shire under the Local Government Act 1960.

== Wards ==
The shire is divided into 4 wards.

- Town Ward (3 councillors)
- West Ward (3 councillors)
- Central Ward (2 councillors)
- East Ward (1 councillor)

From 1964 until 3 May 2003, the following system existed:

- Town Ward
- Central Ward
- Dudinin Ward
- East Ward
- Jitarning Ward
- Kulin Rock Ward

== Towns and localities ==
The towns and localities of the Shire of Kulin with population and size figures based on the most recent Australian census:

Locality	Population	Area	Map
Dudinin	59 (SAL 2021)	396.8 km^{2} (153.2 sq mi)	
Holt Rock	46 (SAL 2021)	772.8 km^{2} (298.4 sq mi)	
Jilakin	49 (SAL 2021)	589.2 km^{2} (227.5 sq mi)	
Jitarning	63 (SAL 2021)	439.9 km^{2} (169.8 sq mi)	
Kulin	352 (SAL 2021)	322.8 km^{2} (124.6 sq mi)	
Kulin West	88 (SAL 2021)	495.8 km^{2} (191.4 sq mi)	
Little Italy	34 (SAL 2021)	408.6 km^{2} (157.8 sq mi)	
Pingaring	60 (SAL 2021)	877.6 km^{2} (338.8 sq mi)	
Walyurin	32 (SAL 2021)	408.8 km^{2} (157.8 sq mi)	

== Population ==
Historical population

Year	Pop.	±% p.a.
1921	1,121	—
1933	1,274	+1.07%
1947	873	−2.66%
1954	1,168	+4.25%
1961	1,261	+1.10%
1966	1,393	+2.01%
1971	1,260	−1.99%
1976	1,289	+0.46%
1981	1,275	−0.22%

Year	Pop.	±% p.a.
1986	1,162	−1.84%
1991	1,062	−1.78%
1996	890	−3.47%
2001	839	−1.17%
2006	881	+0.98%
2011	826	−1.28%
2016	765	−1.52%
2021	769	+0.10%

== Heritage-listed places ==
As of 2023, 140 places are heritage-listed in the Shire of Kulin, of which two are on the State Register of Heritage Places.

Place name	Place #	Street name	Suburb or town	Co-ordinates	Built	State registered	Notes & former names	Photo
Kulin Town Hall	1426	39 Johnston Street	Kulin	32.670586°S 118.154384°E	1928	23 January 2004	Kulin Road Board offices, Kulin Telecentre, Kulin Memorial Hall	
Pingaring CWA Rooms	6912	Luke Price Street	Pingaring	32.753033°S 118.626594°E	1956	23 January 2004	Side of the post office from 1937 to 1954	
