= Kondinin, Western Australia =

Kondinin
- Town
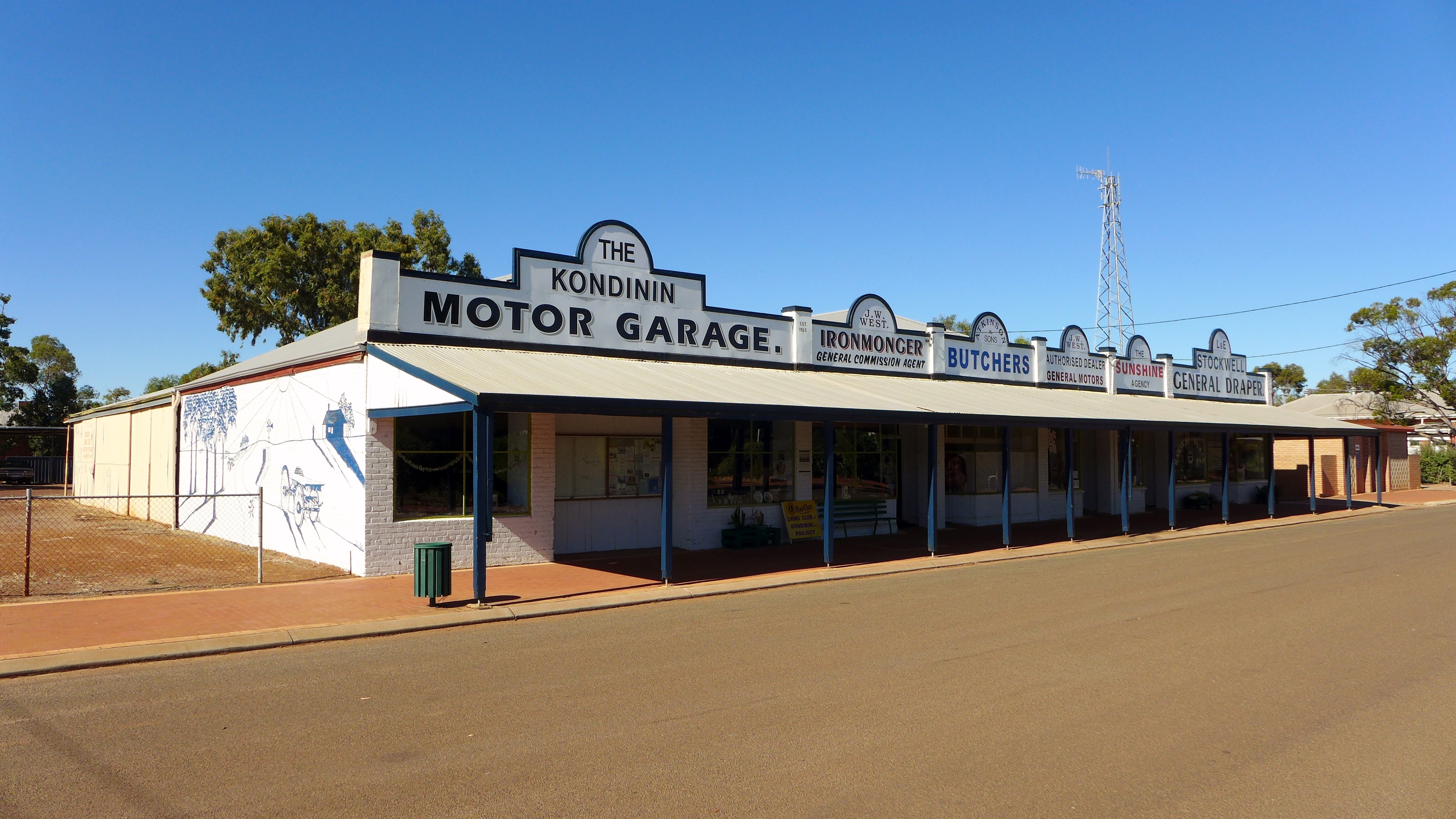
- A row of historic shops in Gordon Street, 2014

- Interactive map of Kondinin
- Coordinates: 32.49°S 118.27°E
- Country: Australia
- State: Western Australia
- LGA: Shire of Kondinin
- Location: 279 km (173 mi) E of Perth; 126 km (78 mi) S of Merredin
- Established: 1900s

Government
  - State electorate: Roe
  - Federal division: O'Connor

Area
  - Total: 1,165.4 km^{2} (450.0 sq mi)

Population
  - Total: 226 (UCL 2021)
- Postcode: 6367

Kondinin is a town in the eastern Wheatbelt region of Western Australia, 279 kilometres (173 mi) east of the state capital, Perth via the Brookton Highway and State Route 40 between Corrigin and Hyden. It is one of three towns in the Shire of Kondinin. At the 2006 census, Kondinin had a population of 311.

== History ==
The first European known to have visited the Kondinin area was Captain John Septimus Roe, Surveyor General of the Swan River Colony on his 1848–1849 expedition to examine the south coast. He encountered a group of Aboriginal people 55 kilometres (34 mi) east of Nalyaring (near Brookton) who guided the expedition party to several water sources before leaving the party at Yeerakine (just south-east of Kondinin) as this was the limit of their territory. The lake and well nearby came to be known as Kondinin, although the meaning is unknown.

In the early years, settlers occasionally encountered groups of Aborigines hunting possums. Although artifacts such as grinding stones and stone choppers have been found in the district, no signs of permanent occupation were found by early settlers other than the mia-mias built by "Europeanised" Aboriginal shepherds from Narrogin in the employ of Michael Brown.

Brown, a businessman from Narrogin, took up large pastoral leases in the Kulin/Kondinin area in 1905. These and other leases in the area were terminated in 1909/1910 to allow the government to distribute the land for agricultural purposes.

The town of Kondinin began life as a railway station on the railway line from Yilliminning to Kondinin, built from 1911 to 1915. The district around Kondinin was already settled when the government chose to construct a railway line here in 1911.

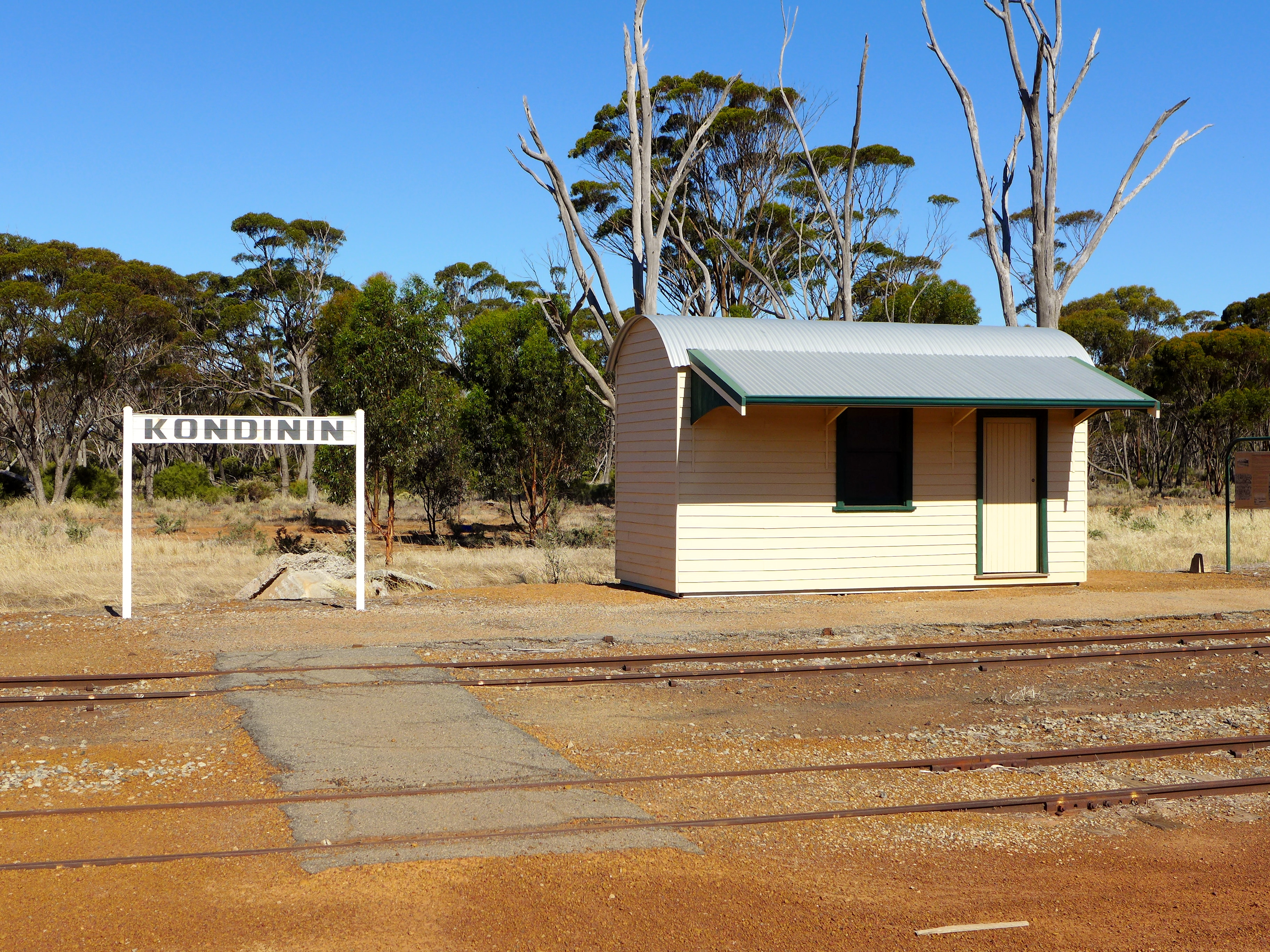
Railway station, Jones Street, 2014

The townsite was gazetted in 1915.

In 1949 the bulk wheat bin in town and another at Notting, located about 2 miles (3 km) from Kondinin, were both filled after a good season with excellent yields in the area despite the recorded rainfall of the previous year being only 10 inches (254 mm).

== Present day ==
Kondinin has a population of about 300 and is a key agricultural centre for a district whose main activities are wheat and sheep farming. It contains a TAFE centre, a primary school (the nearest high school being 23 km away in Kulin), National Australia Bank, Bankwest, shopping facilities, accommodation (hotel, motel, caravan park), council offices and a telecentre.

The town is a stop on the Transwa bus service to Esperance.

The surrounding areas produce wheat and other cereal crops. The town is a receival site for Cooperative Bulk Handling.

It is also known as the "Home of the Group" – the Kondinin Group, a farm improvement group that originated in Kondinin in 1955 and now has its head office in Perth, and other offices in Queensland, NSW, Victoria and South Australia. The Kondinin Group was formed as a self-help farmer group to study farm machinery reliability in the wheatbelt of Western Australia. It grew substantially in the 1990s and since 2000 has had about 10,000 members from mostly large scale cropping and livestock enterprises. Research suggests that the Kondinin Group has had a significant impact on the farm practices of its members. In surveys, it was preferred over consultants, suppliers, state departments of agriculture and accountants as a source of reliable and impartial information. The Kondinin Group runs an online bookstore that sells manuals on practical farm skills, teaching guides on agricultural industries and other materials, and publishes a magazine; both channels are used to disseminate Kondinin Group's research and related training. The community of Kondinin, through its historical innovation, continues to have a major impact on broadacre agriculture throughout Australia and is an acknowledged influence on agricultural extension throughout the world. This is recognised by Kondinin's continued use as the brand name of the group.

The Centenary of Women's Suffrage Gazebo is located in Kondinin.
