= Kulin, Western Australia =

Town in the Wheatbelt region of Western Australia

Kulin
- Town
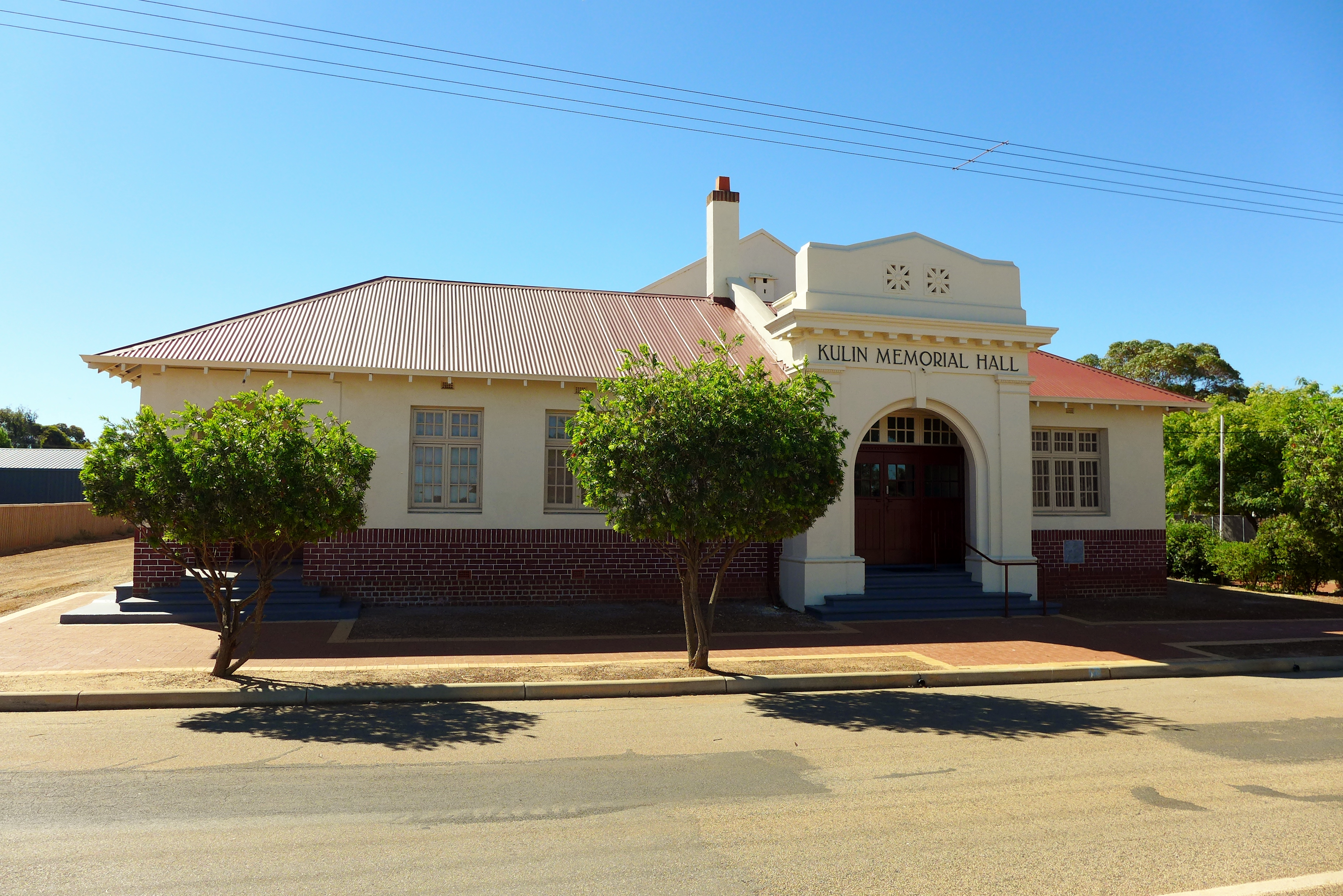
- Kulin Memorial Hall, 2014

- Interactive map of Kulin
- Coordinates: 32.67°S 118.15°E
- Country: Australia
- State: Western Australia
- LGA: Shire of Kulin
- Location: 283 km (176 mi) from Perth; 23 km (14 mi) from Kondinin
- Established: 1900s

Government
  - State electorate: Roe
  - Federal division: O'Connor

Area
  - Total: 322.8 km^{2} (124.6 sq mi)

Population
  - Total: 294 (UCL 2021)
- Postcode: 6365

Kulin is a town in the eastern Wheatbelt region of Western Australia, approximately 280 km from Perth. It is the main town in the Shire of Kulin.

== History ==
The first European known to have visited the Kulin area was Captain John Septimus Roe, Surveyor General of the Swan River Colony on his 1848-49 expedition to examine the south coast. He encountered a group of Aboriginal people 34 miles east of Nalyaring (near Brookton) who guided the expedition party to several water sources, including the Kulin Rock soak, before leaving the party at Yeerakine Rock (just south and east of Kondinin) as this was the limit of their territory. These guides used the name "Coolin" to describe the area now known as Kulin Rock.

In the early years, settlers occasionally encountered groups of Aborigines hunting possums. Although artifacts such as grinding stones and stone choppers have been found in the district, no signs of permanent occupation were found by early settlers other than the mia-mias built by "Europeanised" Aboriginal shepherds from Narrogin in the employ of Michael Brown.

Brown, a businessman from Narrogin, took up large pastoral leases in the Kulin/Kondinin area including Kulin Rock and Gnarming in 1905. These and other leases in the area were terminated in 1909/1910 to allow the government to distribute the land for agricultural purposes.

The first land selected for farming in the Kulin area was at Wogolin and Dudinin in January 1909 – extending from the more established areas of Narrogin and Wickepin. Settlement did not proceed evenly from this direction however as early farmers selected areas with better soils or reliable water sources. This was the case at Kulin Rock with Edward John (Dick) Reardon and Michael Healy arriving there in February 1909 to take up farming land. Much of this activity took place before the official survey at the end of 1909 including James Fitt (previously an overseer for Brown) taking up land adjoining Jilakin Rock and at Jitarning.

Jilakin had been the original name of the location in 1913; in 1915 it was changed to Kulin.

In 1932 the Wheat Pool of Western Australia announced that the town would have two grain elevators, each fitted with an engine, installed at the railway siding.

== Present day ==
Kulin has a population of about 350 and is an agricultural centre for a district whose main activities are wheat and sheep farming. Wildflower viewing is possible during September and October. The town contains a district high school, a Bendigo Bank, shopping facilities, accommodation (hotel, motel, caravan park), council offices and a telecentre. Every year in October, it hosts the Kulin Bush Races.

Kulin has its own police station, which covers the shire and surrounding areas. It has two permanent police officers who live in the township and conduct highway patrols and provide support to nearby stations.

The town is a stop on the Transwa bus service to Esperance.

The surrounding areas produce wheat and other cereal crops. The town is a receival site for Cooperative Bulk Handling.

=== Tin horses ===
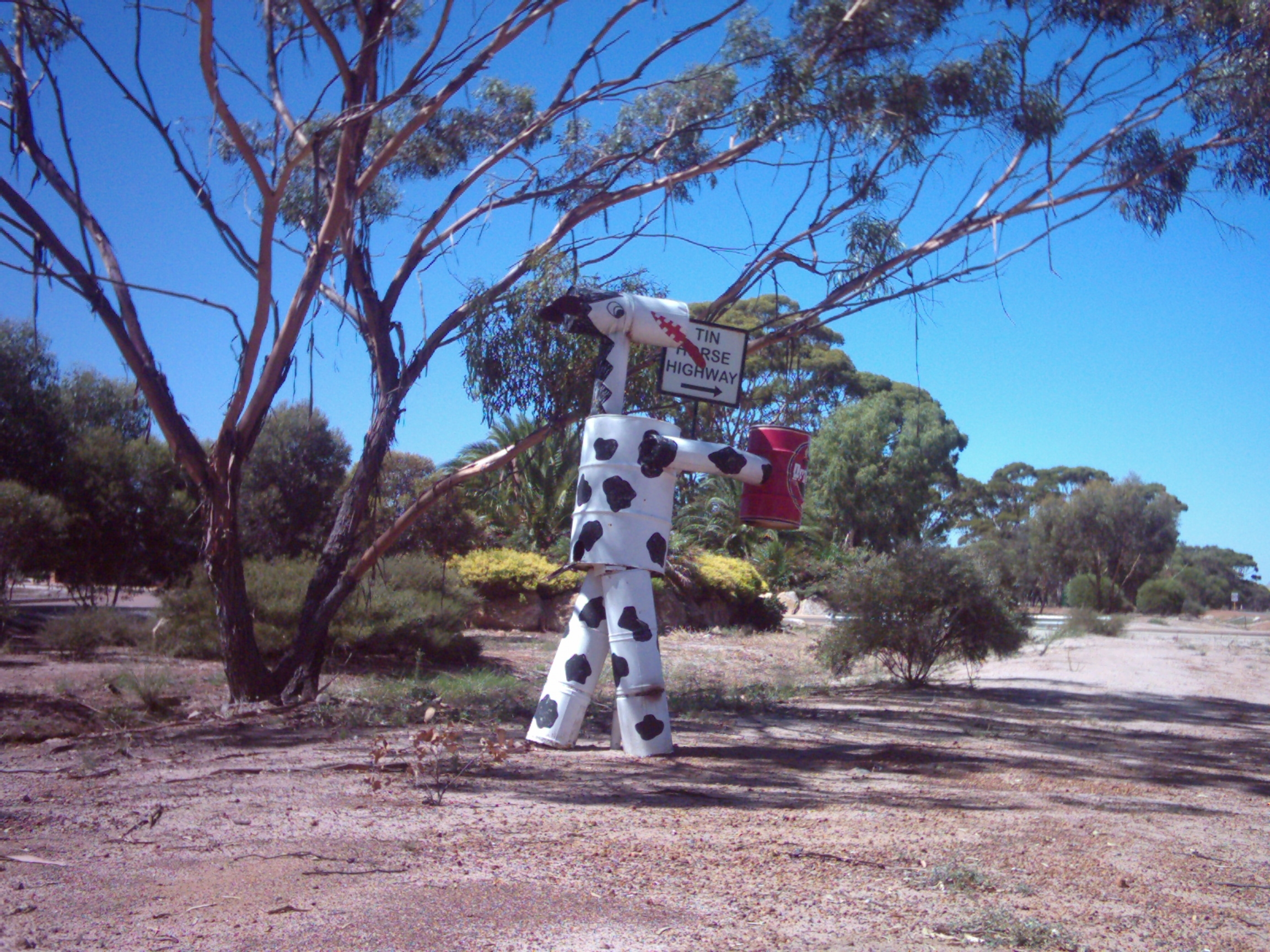
Tin horse near Kulin

The roads leading into and through Kulin have a collection of over 100 tin horses. The largest is 10 m long and stands 5 m high. All the horses are made primarily from lubricant tins and drums. They are from entries into the annual competition as part of the local race day.

=== Kulin Bush Races ===
The Kulin Bush Races is an annual event involving horse races, betting, alcohol and fireworks. It is held on one day, but campers can sleep the night the day before and after the event. All money made from the event is put back into the community.

=== Water slide ===
The water slide at the Kulin Aquatic Centre is the largest in regional Western Australia; it is 18 metres (59 ft) high and 182 metres (597 ft) long. It was opened in 2001.

The slide was funded by a local farmer to improve local sport and recreation. It was bought from Tanawha, Queensland, disassembled and trucked to Kulin by local volunteers, then reassembled.

=== Blazing Swan ===
Blazing Swan is an annual regional Burning Man event held in Kulin. It is a 7-day event which is an experiment in temporary community and artistic expression, and is guided by the ten principles of Burning Man, plus an eleventh - consent. The event occurs around Easter each year, with the 2017 event scheduled for 12–18 April. The event location is in dry bushland near Jilakin Lake, and is referred to as Jilakin Rock City. Each year a swan-shaped wooden effigy is built and burned at the culmination of the event.
