= Granite outcrops of Western Australia =

Landforms of Western Australia

Granite outcrops of Western Australia are weathered landforms that occur throughout the state of Western Australia, composed primarily of the rock type granite. All recognised types of this landform can be observed, commonly as bornhardts, but also as inselbergs, castle koppies and nubbins. Rising abruptly from the surrounding landscape they create a variety of microhabitats for plants, and provide seasonal resources and refuge for a range of animals. These areas thus have rich biodiversity and many endemic species. They are significant locations that tie in with the Aboriginal and European cultural heritage of Western Australia.

== Ecology ==
Granite outcrops in the state are ecologically complex and insular, often providing niches for ancient lineages of organisms that are relics of a wetter climate. These niches include unfractured rock surface that is covered in biofilm, composed of cyanobacteria that give massive rockfaces a characteristic colour. Crusts of lichens also appear, visible mats constructed by blue-green alga and fungal associations that may be up to a billion years old. Mats composed primarily of moss and spike-moss are also found when adequate moisture is available, which in turns provides opportunities for other organisms. At least 1300 plant species occur on granite outcrops in Western Australia, many of which are endemic to these sites. Some of these plant species gain a purchase a clefts and fissures in the rock face, and trees or large shrubs may appear in a bonsai-form. Slabs of rock, split by exfoliation or cracked and pushed up to an A profile, form habitat that is cooler, damper, and secure for plant and animal species that are often specially adapted to the narrow environ.

Pools of rainwater known as gnammas often form on granite outcrops. These provide habitat to around 230 aquatic invertebrates, of which at least 50 are endemic to these pools, and provide fresh water to other inhabitants and visitors.

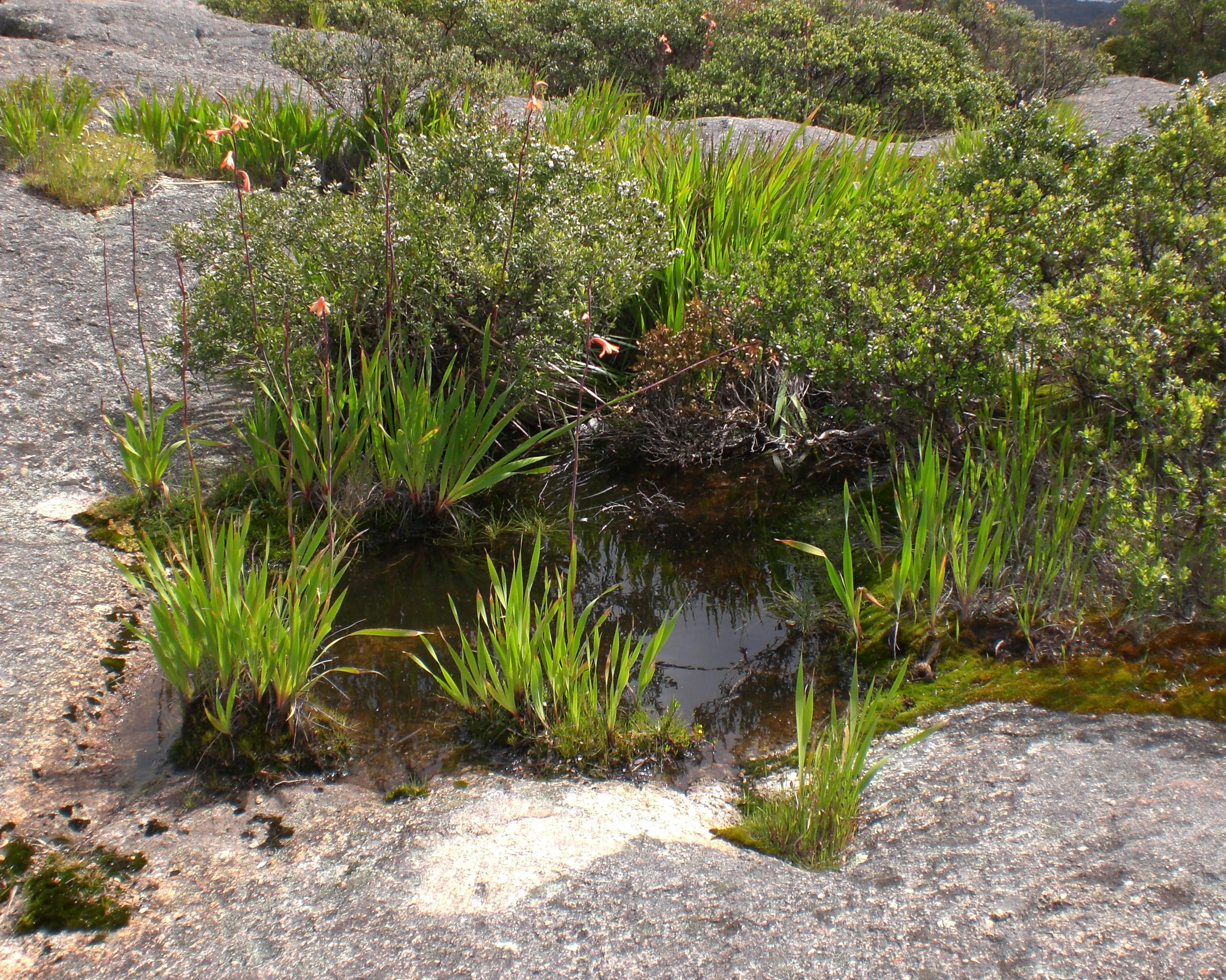
Gnamma on Mount Melville, Albany

The flora of these granitic outcrops is notable in many regards. Woody species may include tall trees, eucalypts, sheoak, acacia, and rock figs of the genus Ficus, smaller species include these genera and taxa of verticordia, banksia, grevillea, and melaleuca. The number of orchid species occurring on them is 141, and 16% of these are endemic to these landforms. Those orchid species endemic to outcrops may be widely distributed or, as with Spiculaea ciliata, only found at locations separated by a few kilometres.

Human use of the outcrops has been well documented, and as a resource—for food and especially permanent water—they were often crucial to existence.

More recent material also provides useful information as to how to manage the environment of the rocks and their surroundings.

Studies and conferences have also explored the natural history. A number of animals are restricted to granite outcrops, including four species of reptile, the mygalomorph spider Teyl luculentus, and the larvae of the chironomid fly Archaeochlus. They are also an important habitat of rock-wallabies such as the black-flanked rock-wallaby, and Ctenophorus ornatus, the ornate crevice-dragon. Granitic outcrops also provide refuge for animals, as temporary protection against predation or seasonal habitat insulated from the extremes of weather.

== Great Southern region ==
Granite outcrops occur along the southern coast of the state, where they are exposed to high winds and extremes and wave and tidal action. They often form steep coastline, headlands and islands.

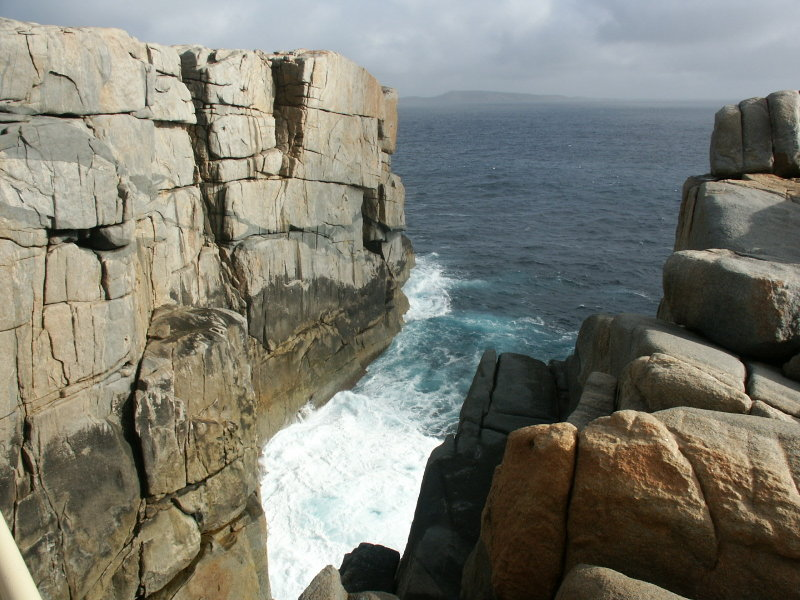
The Gap, Torndirrup

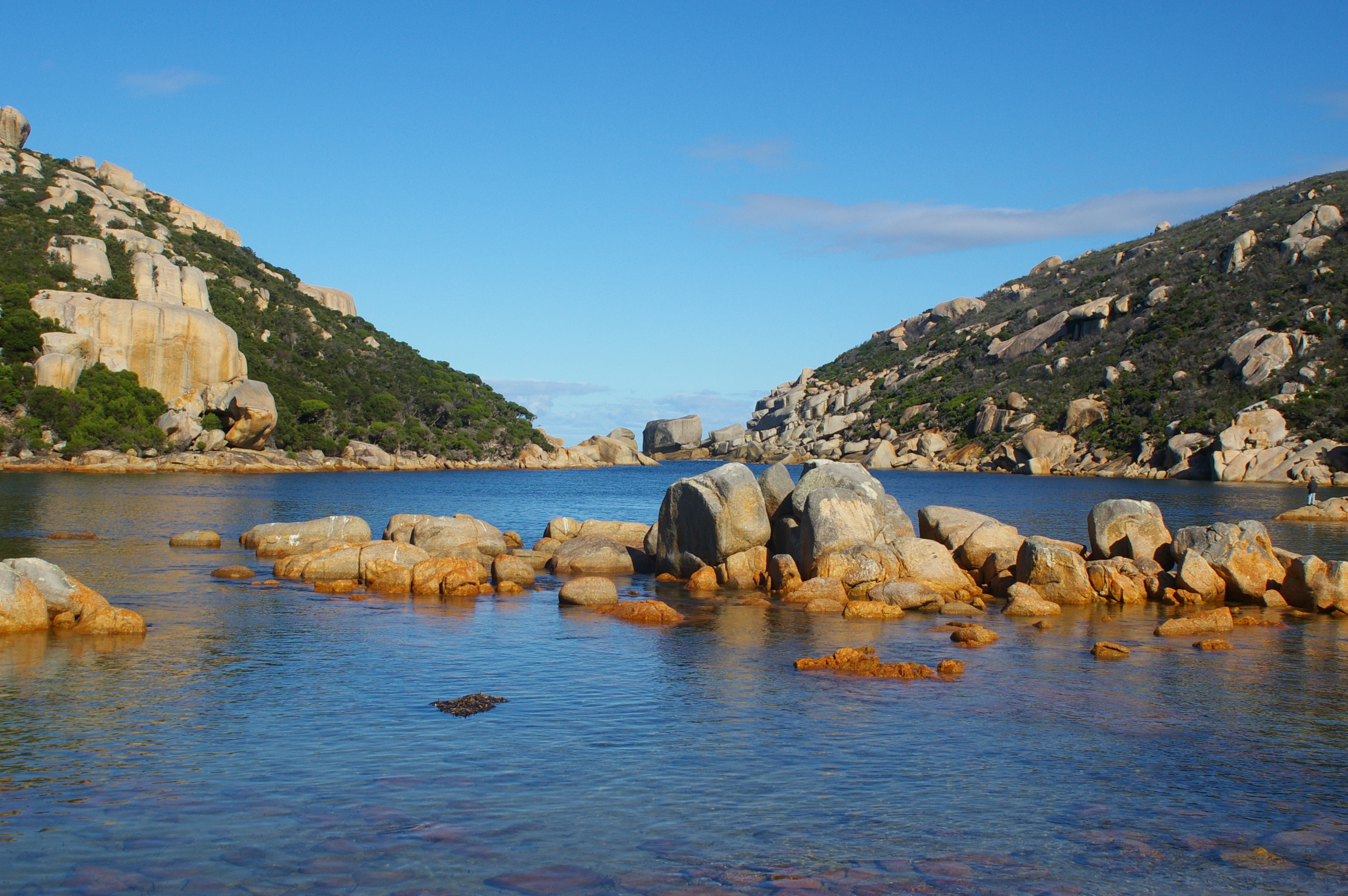
Waychinicup Inlet

- The granitic forms at the coast of Torndirrup National Park
- Gibraltar Rock
- Castle Rock and Balancing Rock at Porongurup National Park
- The granitic forms at Two Peoples Bay
- The granitic forms at Waychinicup National Park, Mount Manypeaks and Cheynes Beach.
- Elephant Rocks, granite boulders that make up Greens Pool and other forms at William Bay National Park
- The granitic forms around Mount Melville and Mount Clarence in Albany

== Wheatbelt region ==
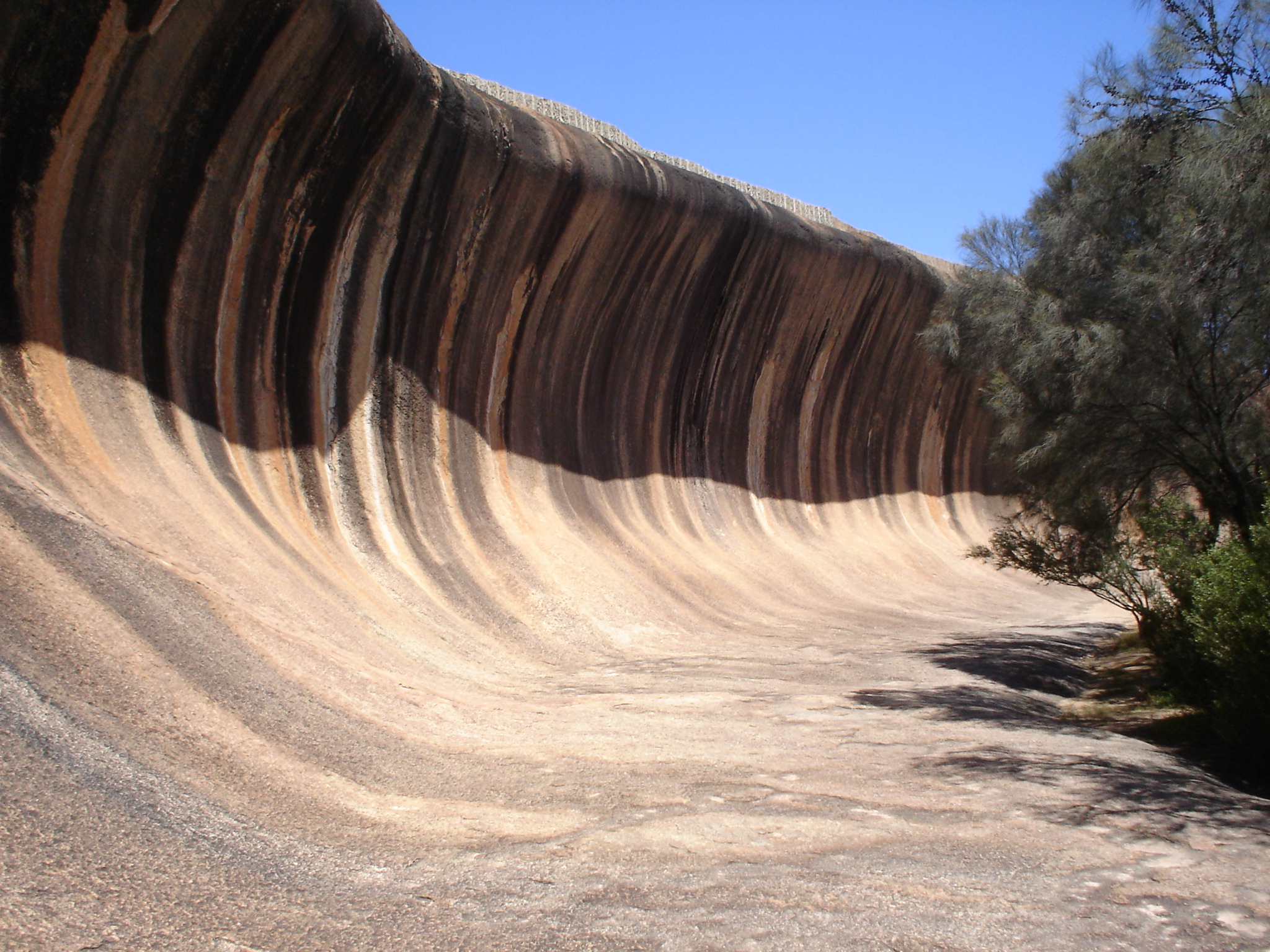
Wave Rock

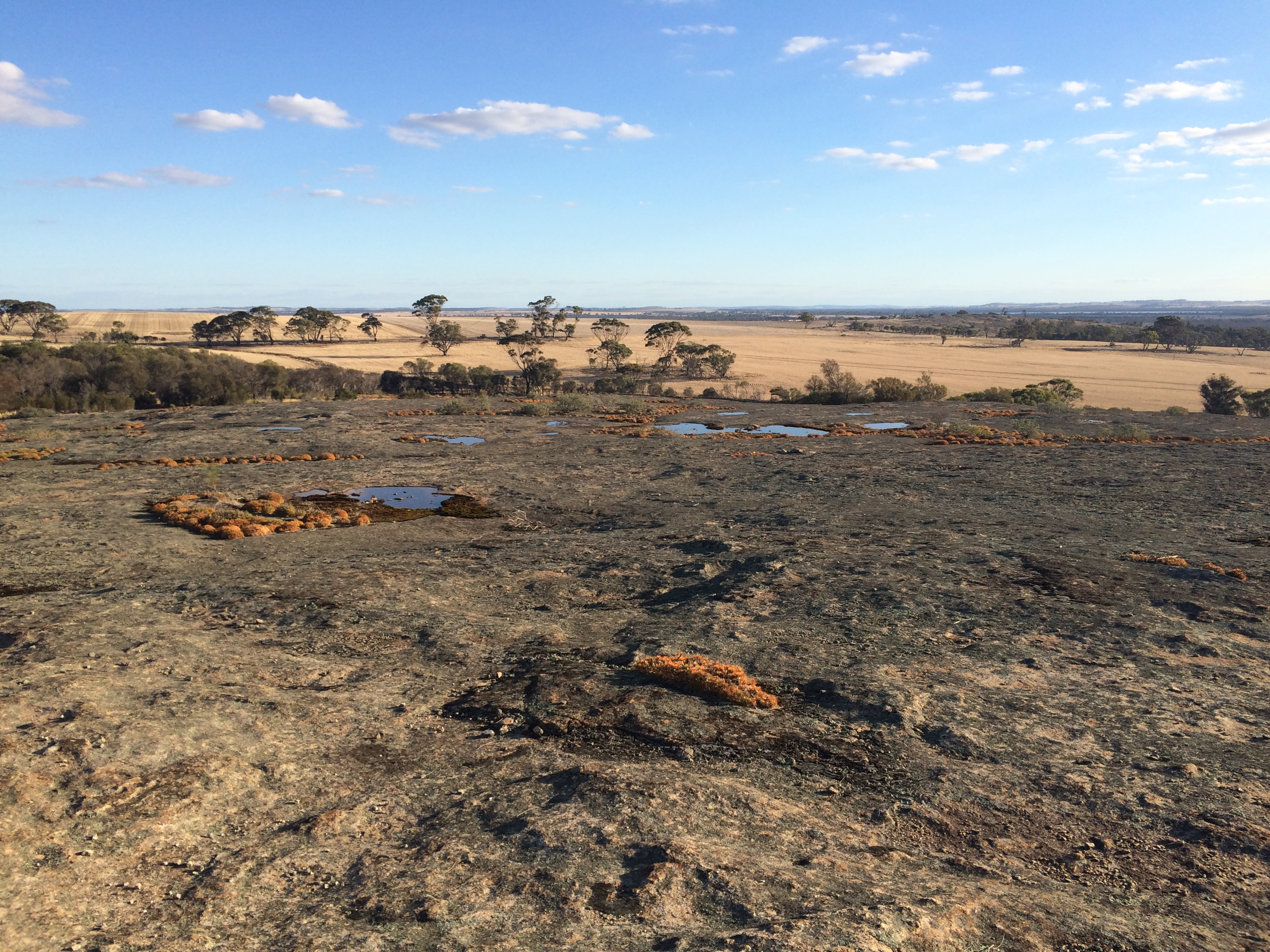
Puntapin Rock facing east

- Baladjie Rock
- Beringbooding Rock
- Boyagin Rock
- Bruce Rock
- Corrigin Rock
- Datjoin Rock
- Eaglestone Hill
- Elachbutting Rock
- Gorge Rock 32°27′S 118°00′E
- Hunts Soak
- Jilakin Rock 32°40′S 118°19′E
- King Rock
- Kokerbin Rock also known as Kokerbin Hill 31°53′S 117°42′E
  - Wave Wall, Dog Rock, Devils Marbles
- Mount Walker 32°01′S 118°45′E
  - Anderson Reserve, Twine Reserve and Roe Dam
- Puntapin Rock
- Sandford Rocks
- The Humps
- Wave Rock
- Westonia Common
  - Boodalim Soak
- Yeerakine Rock
- Yilliminning Rock east of Narrogin
- Yorkrakine Rock

== See also ==
- List of rocks in Western Australia

== Notes and references ==
- Bayly, I.A.E. Rock of ages : human use and natural history of Australian granites Nedlands, W.A.: Tuart House, 1999.ISBN 1-876268-29-8
- Granite Outcrops Symposium, 14–15 September 1996. pp. 87–237. Journal of the Royal Society of Western Australia. vol.80, pt.3 (September 1997)
- Nikulinsky, P.; Hopper, S.D. (2008). Life on the rocks : the art of survival (Revised ed.). Fremantle Press. ISBN 9781921361289.
