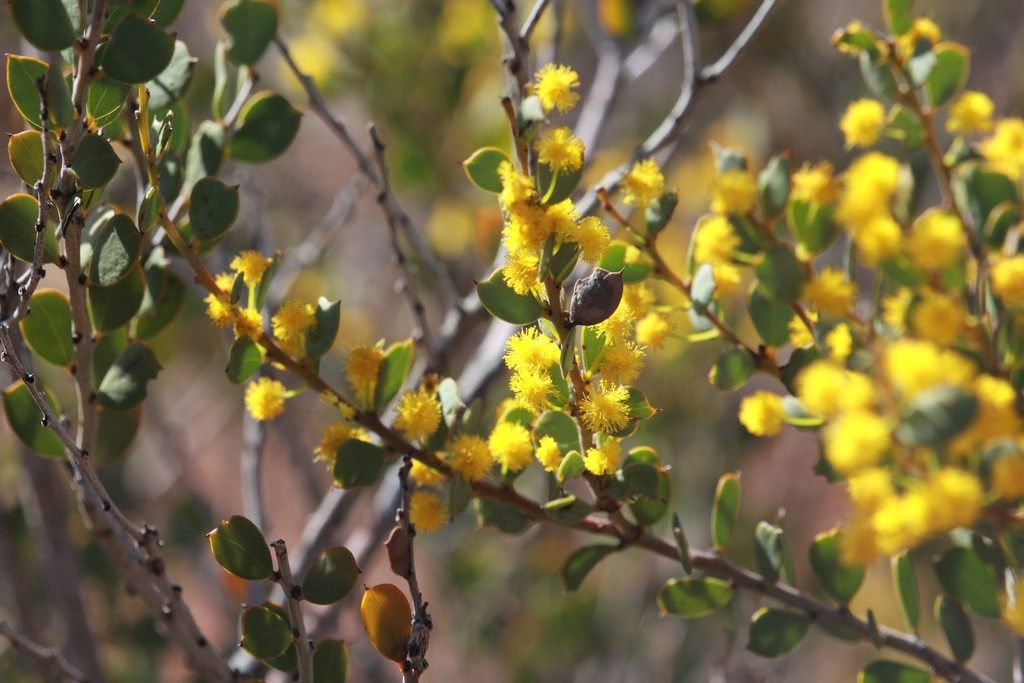
- Near Baladjie Rock

Scientific classification
- Kingdom: Plantae
- Clade: Tracheophytes
- Clade: Angiosperms
- Clade: Eudicots
- Clade: Rosids
- Order: Fabales
- Family: Fabaceae
- Subfamily: Caesalpinioideae
- Clade: Mimosoid clade
- Genus: Acacia
- Species: A. acoma

Binomial name
- Acacia acoma Maslin
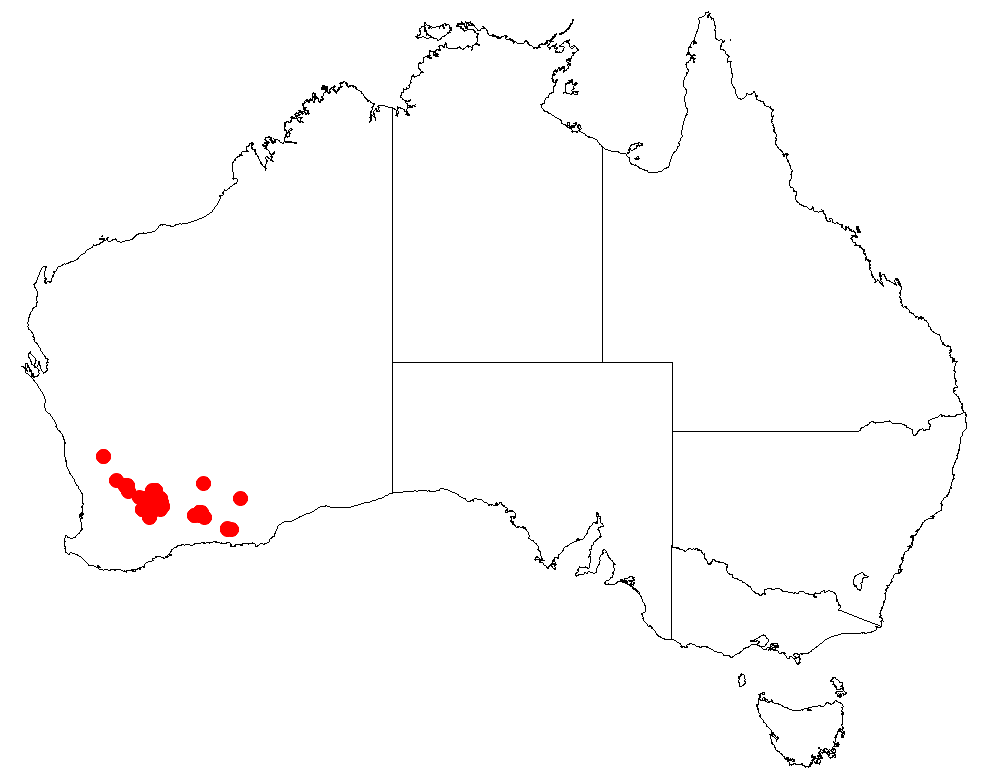
- Occurrence data from AVH

Synonyms
- Racosperma acomum (Maslin) Pedley

= Acacia acoma =

Species of legume

Acacia acoma is a species of flowering plant in the family Fabaceae and is endemic to inland areas of south-western Western Australia. It is an erect, spindly, open or spreading shrub with variably-shaped, often narrowly oblong phyllodes, flowers arranged in spherical heads, usually arranged in pairs in leaf axils, and strongly curved or spirally coiled pods up to 15 mm (0.59 in) long when expanded.

== Description ==
Acacia acoma is an erect, spindly, open or spreading shrub that typically grows to a height of 0.5–3 m (1 ft 8 in – 9 ft 10 in) and has smooth bark. Its phyllodes are variably-shaped, from narrowly oblong to elliptic or egg-shaped with the narrower end towards the base, mostly 15–30 mm (0.59–1.18 in) long and 7–12 mm (0.28–0.47 in) wide and often sessile. The flowers are borne in a 2-headed raceme 0.5–1 mm (0.020–0.039 in) long on a peduncle 8–21 mm (0.31–0.83 in) long, the heads spherical, 5–6 mm (0.20–0.24 in) in diameter with 30 to 37 golden-yellow flowers. Flowering occurs from July to October, and the pods are strongly curved or spirally coiled, up to 15 mm (0.59 in) long when expanded and 2–3 mm (0.079–0.118 in) wide, containing mottled black and yellowish green seeds 2.5–3.0 mm (0.098–0.118 in) long with a creamy-white conical aril.

== Taxonomy ==
Acacia acoma was first formally described in 1999 by Bruce Maslin from specimens he collected in the Bremer Range in 1983. The specific epithet (acoma) means "without a mane", referring to the lack of bristles on the plant.

== Distribution and habitat ==
This acacia grows on roadsides, low hills, or ridges in whipstick mallee or gimlet woodland mainly from near Hyden to the Bremer Range in the Avon Wheatbelt, Coolgardie and Mallee bioregions of inland south-western Western Australia.

== Conservation status ==
Acacia acoma is listed as "not threatened" by the Government of Western Australia Department of Biodiversity, Conservation and Attractions.

== See also ==
- List of Acacia species
