= Hyden Humps Dam =

Reservoir in Western Australia

Coordinates: 32°19′22″S 118°57′30″E

Hyden Humps Dam is situated approximately 295 km (183 mi) east of Perth, Western Australia.

Hyden Humps Dam is situated at the southern base of The Humps, approximately seventeen kilometres (11 miles) north east of Hyden and fifteen kilometres (9.3 miles) north of Wave Rock.

== Water ==
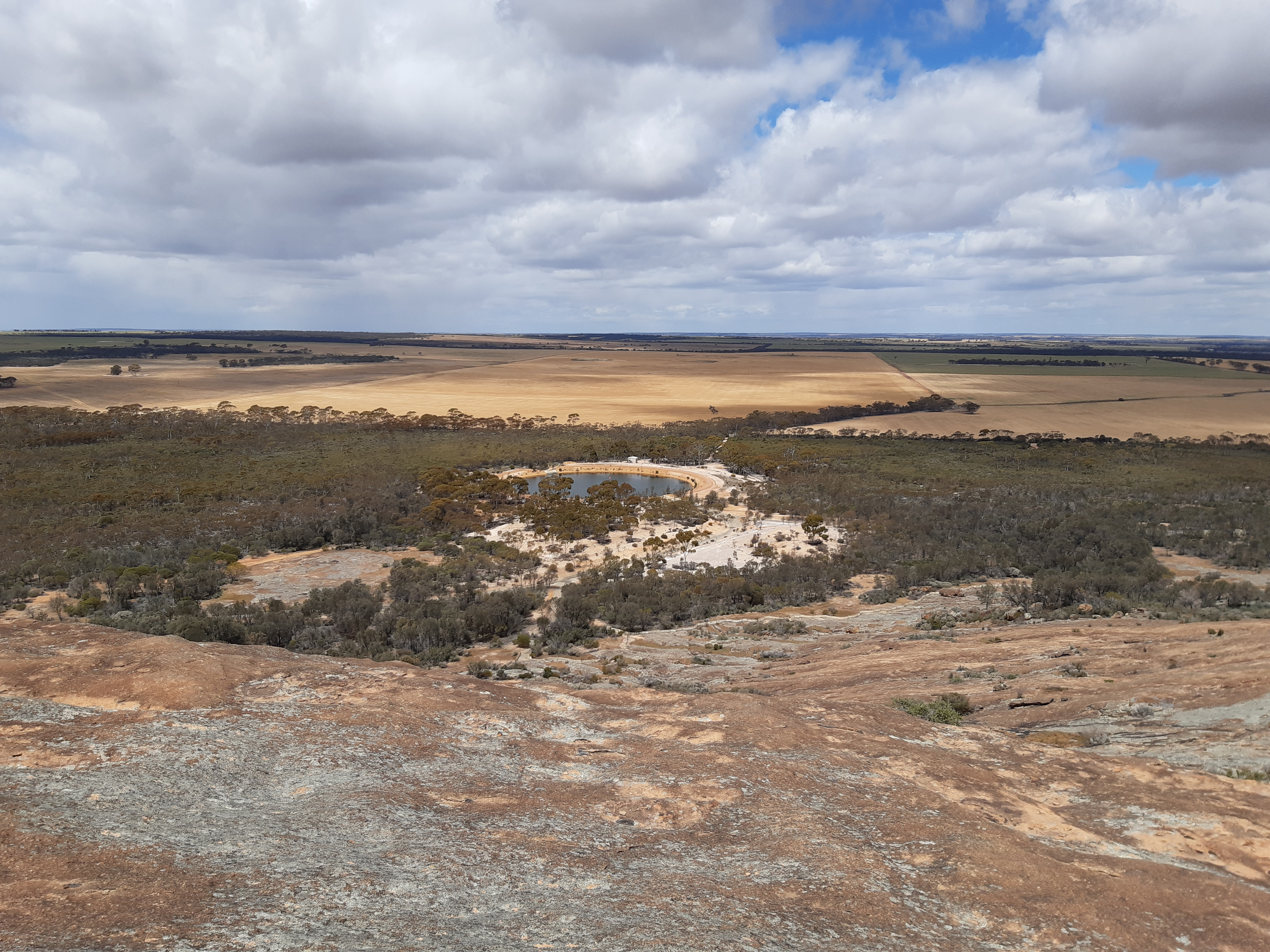
The Hyden Humps Dam, seen from The Humps in 2020

The dam is filled with rainwater runoff which is channeled off the Humps mountain.

== Characteristics ==
The water source is now only used as a backup supply after the completion of the Great Southern scheme where water is piped through the wheatbelt region from the Harris River Dam.

== See also ==
- List of reservoirs and dams in Australia

== Bibliography ==
- Serventy, Vincent. Article on The Humps, a rock formation near Hyden W.A. Naturalist Vol. 3, No. 6, 1952. also at Research Note 552 - Battye Library.
