= Dumbleyung Lake =

Salt lake in Western Australia

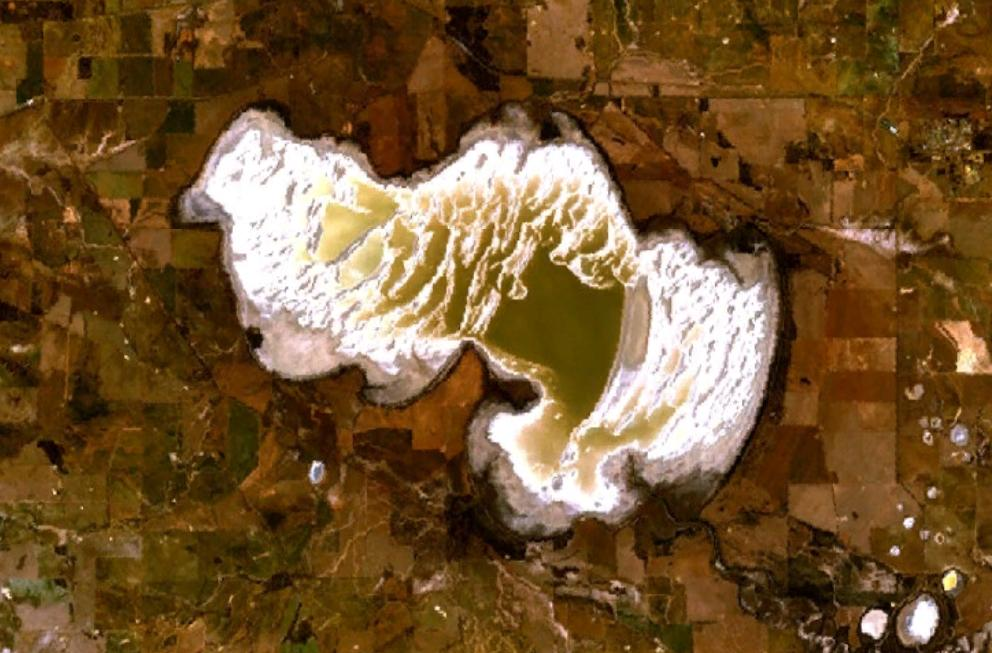
- View from space

- Location in Western Australia
- Interactive map of Dumbleyung Lake
- Location: Great Southern, Western Australia
- Coordinates: 33°20′S 117°39′E
- Type: Salt lake
- Primary inflows: Coblinine River system
- Basin countries: Australia
- Designation: Dumbleyung Lake Nature Reserve
- Max. length: 13 km (8.1 mi)
- Max. width: 6.5 km (4.0 mi)
- Surface area: 52 km^{2} (20 sq mi)
- Average depth: 2.35 m (7.7 ft)
- Max. depth: 4.57 m (15.0 ft)
- Surface elevation: 255 m (837 ft)

Dumbleyung Lake, also widely known as Lake Dumbleyung, is a salt lake in the Great Southern region of Western Australia. The lake has a length of 13 kilometres (8 mi) and a width of 6.5 kilometres (4 mi); it covers a total area of 52 square kilometres (20 sq mi).

== Description ==
The traditional owners of the area are the Noongar peoples. The lake is part of a Dreaming trail that extends from the south coast near Augusta to the Great Victoria Desert country to the north east. Other features along the trail include Mulka's Cave, Wave Rock, Jilakin Rock, Jitarning Rock and Puntapin Rock.

The explorers Henry Landor and Henry Maxwell Lefroy are usually credited with the discovery of Dumbleyung Lake, although it appears to have been shown on a map in 1839 with the name Kondening Lake. Grazing leases around the lake were first granted to George Kersley in 1875.

Dumbleyung Lake received world recognition when Donald Campbell broke the world water speed record on it on 31 December 1964, travelling at 444.66 km/h (276.3 mph) in his boat Bluebird K7. A granite memorial to Campbell can be seen at Pussy Cat Hill, a prominent feature and vantage point to view the entire lake area.

In recent times, the increased soil salination has made the area unsuitable for grazing. Today the lake is mainly used for aquatic recreation. Despite the extreme salinity of the lake, it provides a habitat for many varieties of water birds, and since 1963 has been protected by the Dumbleyung Lake Nature Reserve. The nature reserve was gazetted on 15 March 1963, has a size of 42.08 square kilometres (16.25 mi^{2}), and is located within the Avon Wheatbelt bioregion, but does not cover the entire lake.

The lake is recognised as a DIWA wetland as it is a drought refuge for waterbirds and a moulting area for the Australian shelduck. It is one of the five sites in the Avon-Wheatbelt area.

== See also ==
- List of lakes of Australia § Western Australia
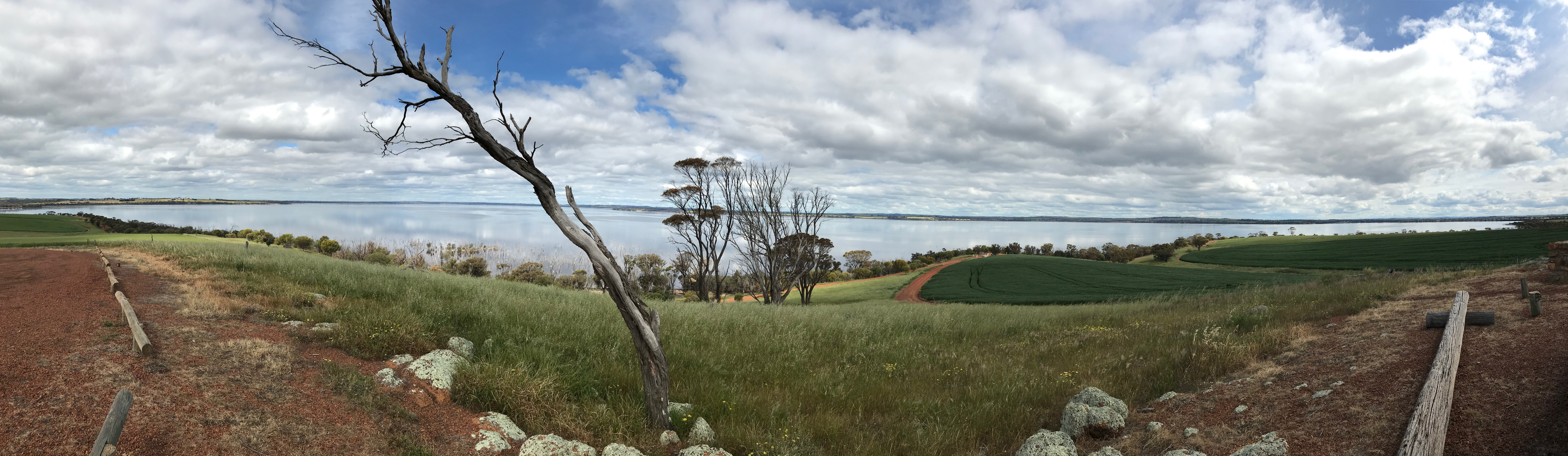
Dumbleyung Lake from Pussycat Hill

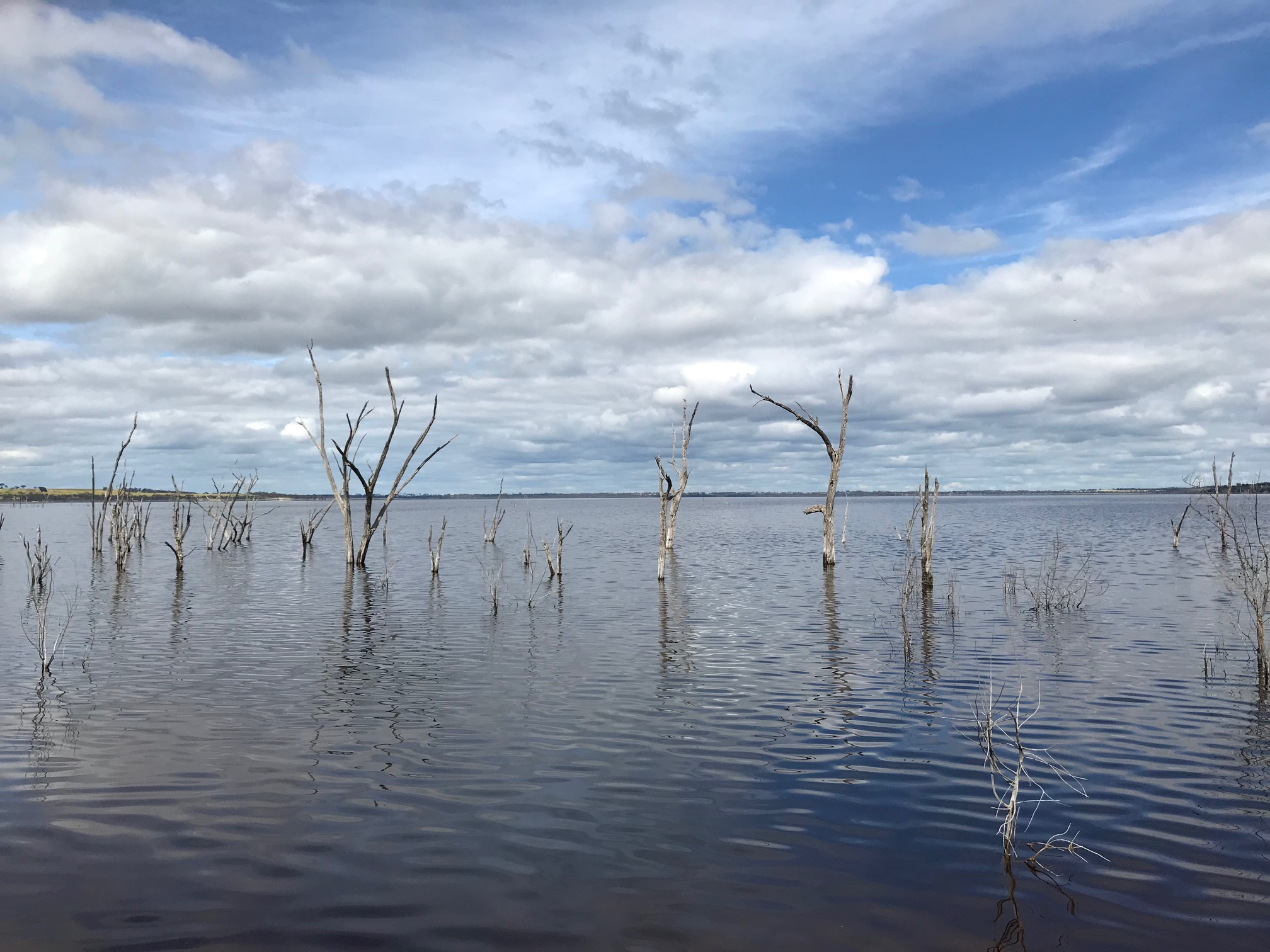
Dumbleyung Lake 2021
