= Puntapin Rock =

Granite rock in the wheatbelt of Western Australia

Coordinates: 33°19′19″S 117°23′54″E

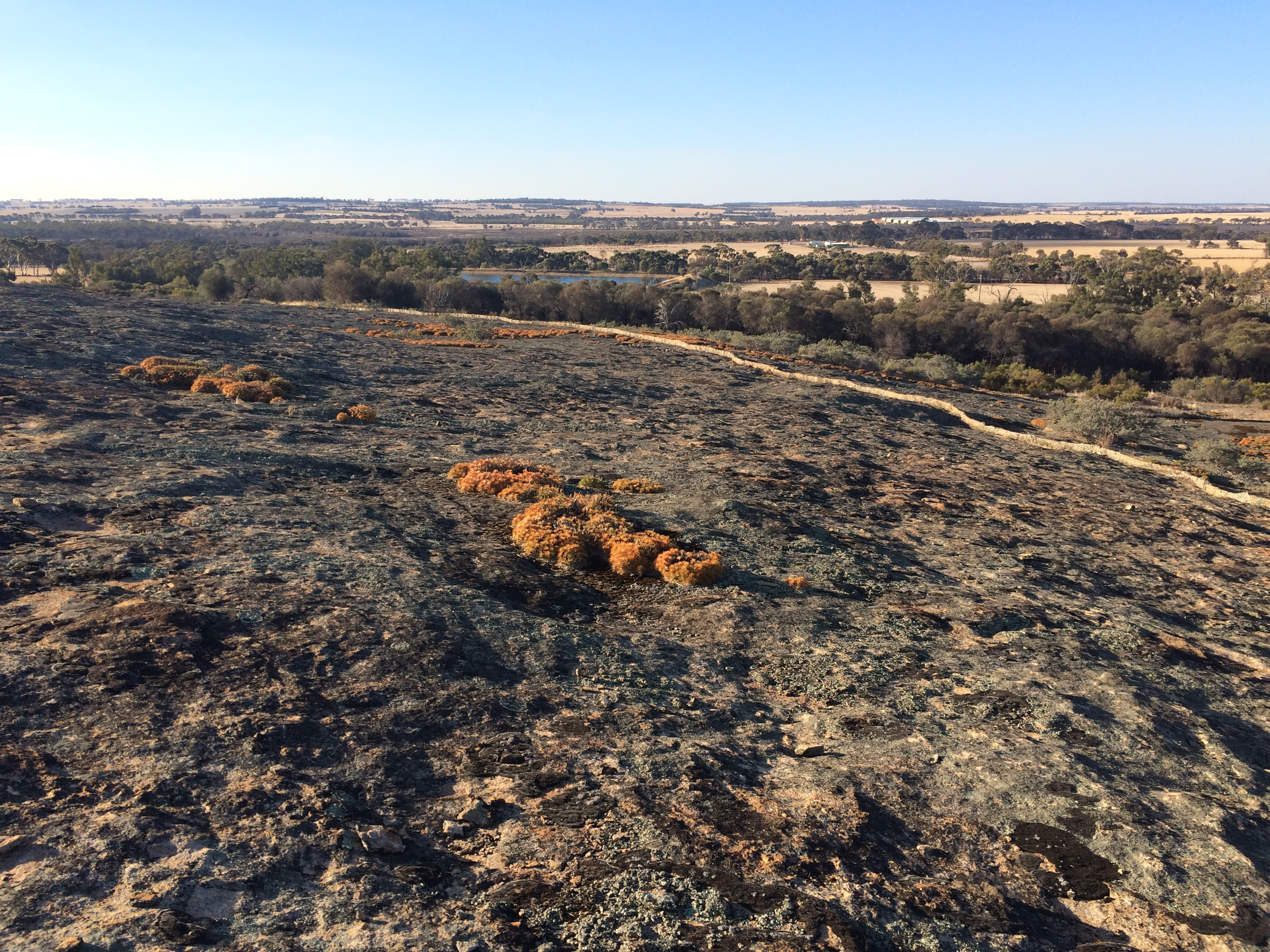
On top of Puntapin Rock facing west toward Wagin

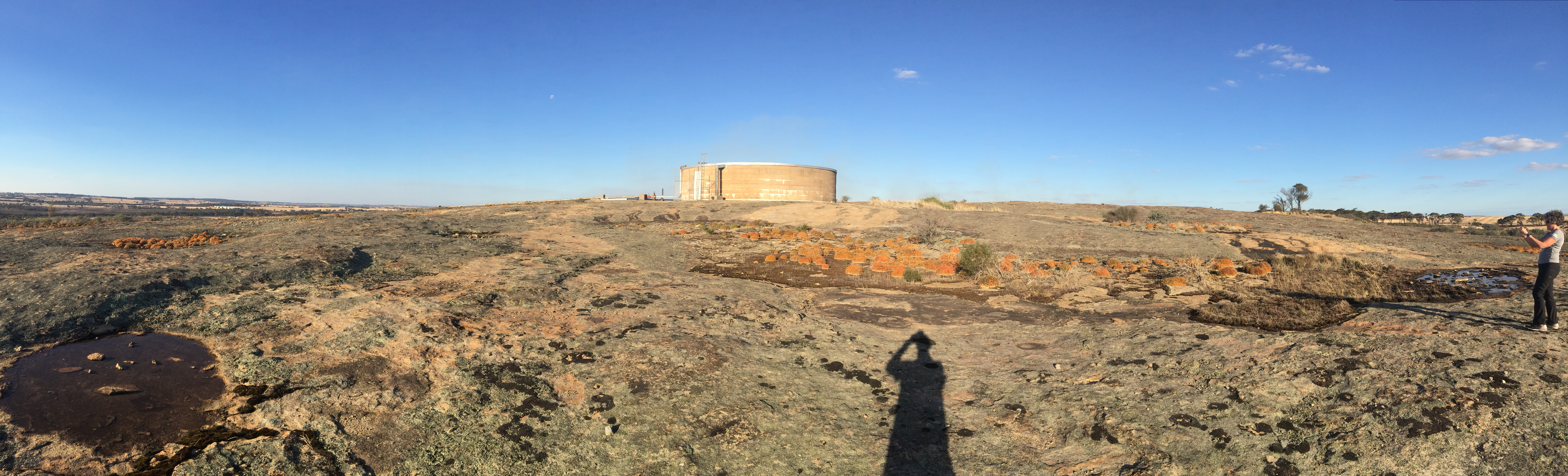
Panorama from top of Puntapin Rock with water tank on top

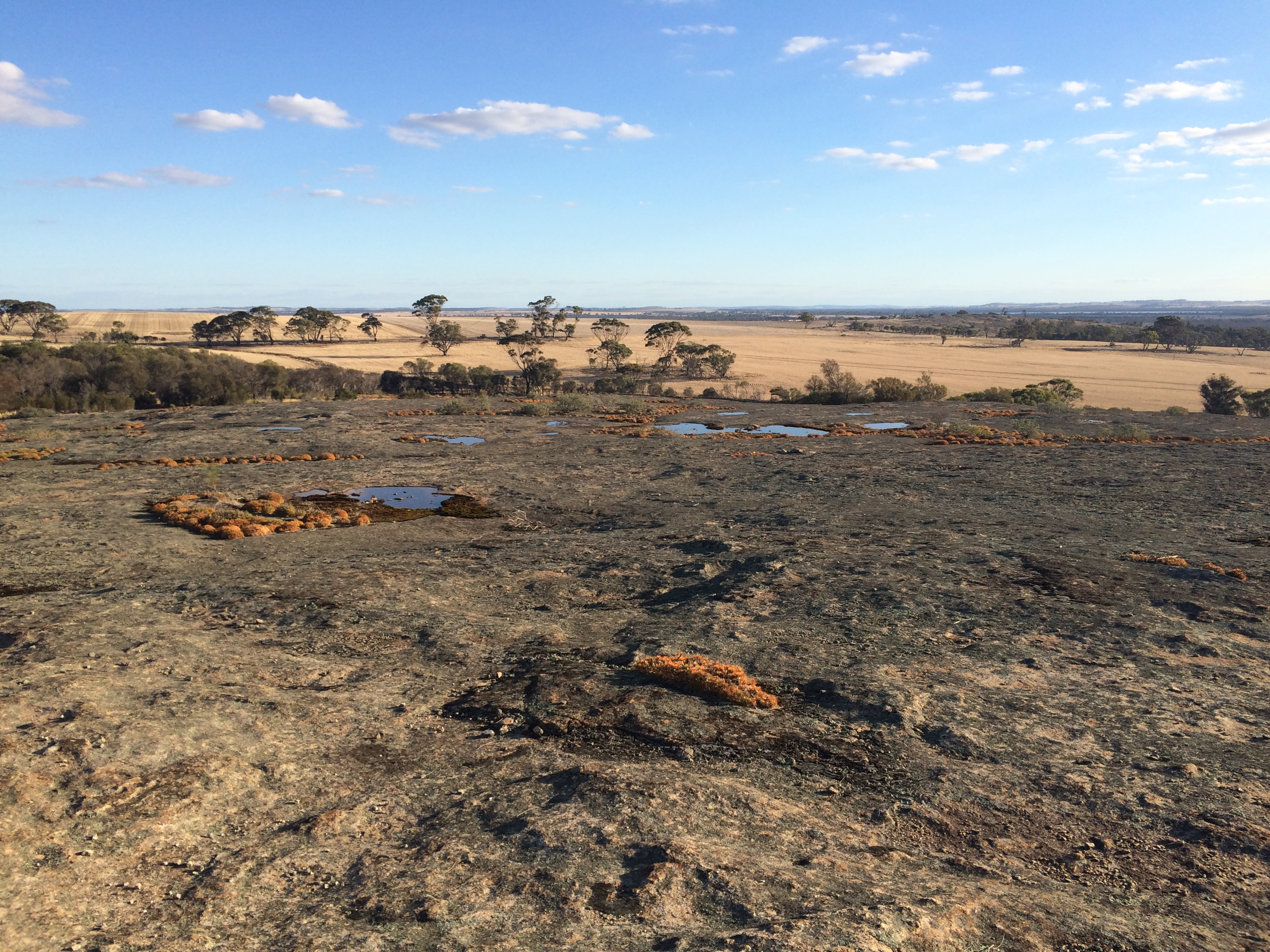
Puntapin Rock facing east

Puntapin Rock is a granite rock formation located approximately 4 km (2.5 mi) south east of Wagin and approximately 30 km (19 mi) west of Dumbleyung in the western Wheatbelt region of Western Australia. It is a prominent feature in the area, rising out of the surrounding flat plains.

The rock has an elevation of 310 m (1,020 ft) and an exposed surface of 42.5 ha (105 acres). It is found in the Yilgarn Block and composed of granite, a partially recrystallized archean adamellite that is mostly homogeneous. The rock does have some deformed lighter coloured veining throughout.

Puntapin Dam was built on the north side of Puntapin Rock in 1929 with a catchment area of 41 ha (100 acres) to replace Badgarning Dam, found 8 km (5.0 mi) west of Wagin, that had been completed in 1912 but continually leaked. A concrete tank with a capacity of 675,000 L (148,000 imp gal; 178,000 US gal) was constructed on top of the rock at some time after it was built. The population of Wagin were dependent on this dam for water supply until 1956 when the town was connected to Wellington Dam. Water from the Puntapin Dam is still mixed into the supply from Wellington.

The area now serves as a tourist attraction and public picnic area, and the Water Authority of Western Australia has allowed access to the rock's summit. The base of the rock has been equipped with picnic tables, toilets, signage and walk trails.

The traditional owners of the area are the Noongar peoples. The granite dome, with its numerous gnamma holes, is a natural water catchment area used by the Noongar as well as the early sandalwood cutters and kangaroo hunters. The rock is part of a dreaming trail that extends from the south coast near Augusta to the Great Victoria Desert country to the north east. Other features along the trail include Mulka's Cave, Wave Rock, Jilakin Rock, Jitarning Rock and Dumbleyung Lake.

== See also ==
- Granite outcrops of Western Australia
