= Jilakin Rock =

Granite rock formation in Western Australia

Coordinates: 32°39′41″S 118°19′34″E

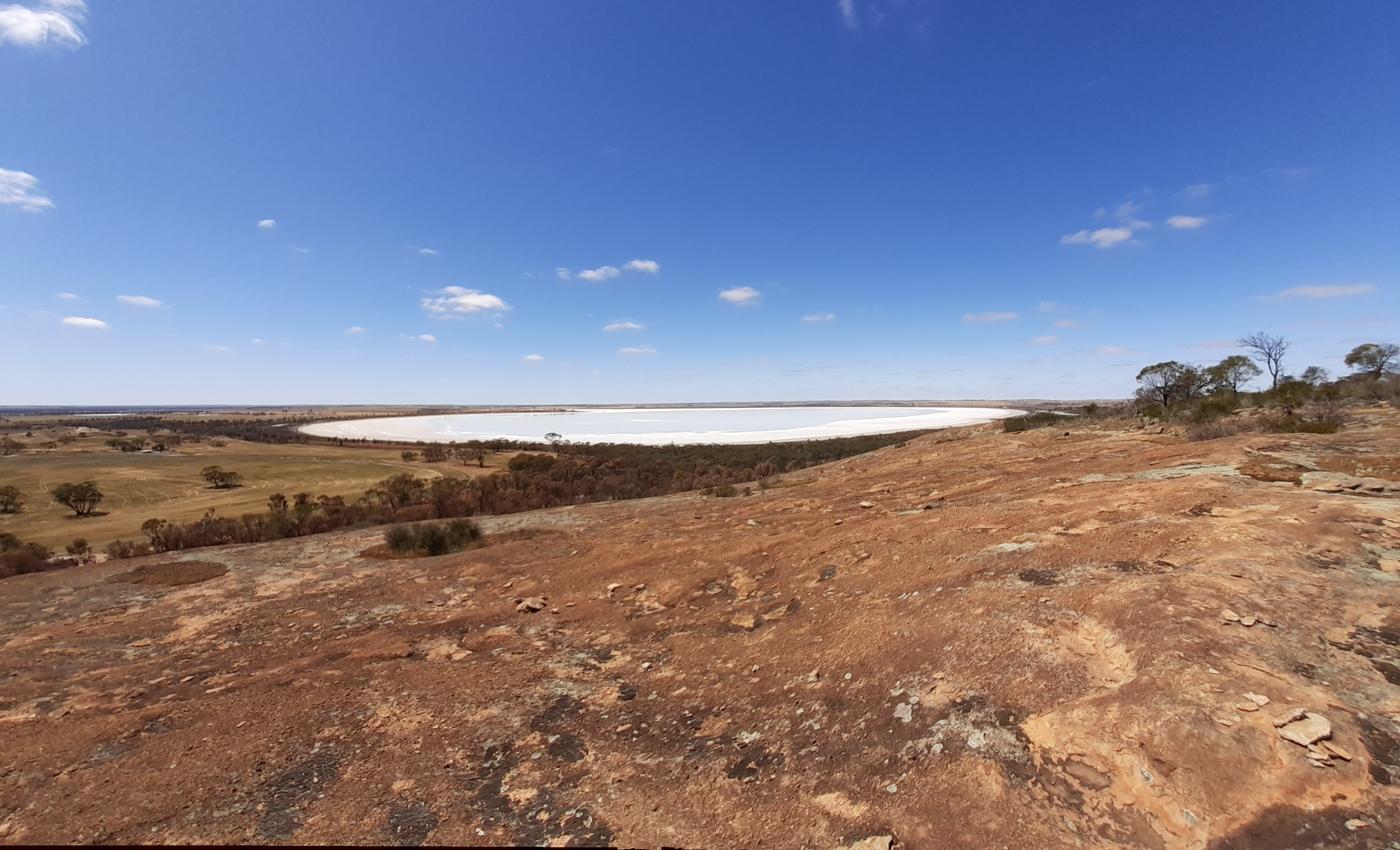
Jilakin Lake seen from Jilakin Rock

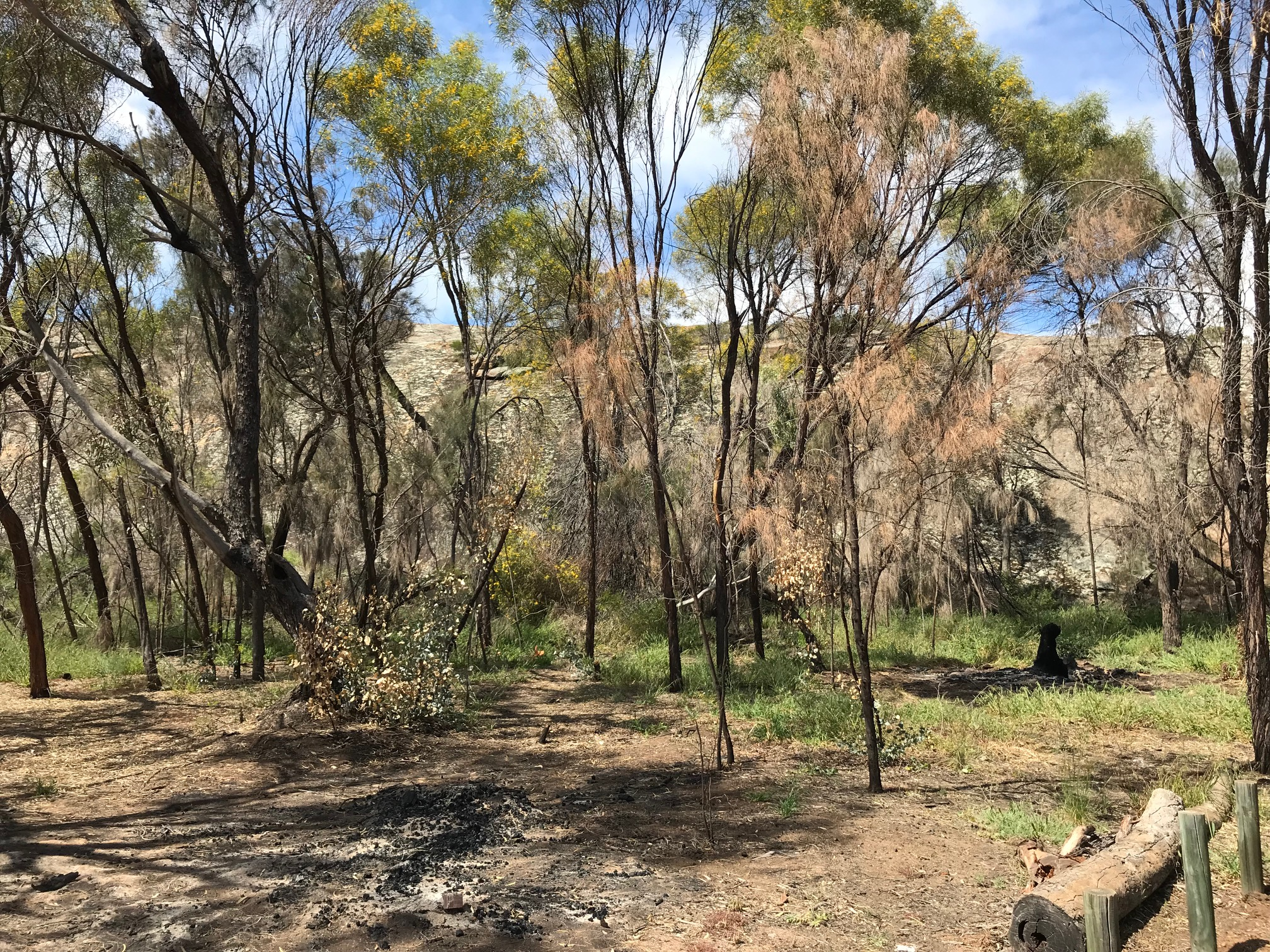
Jilakin Rock from car park at base

Jilakin Rock is a granite rock formation located approximately 15 km (9.3 mi) east of Kulin and approximately 25 km (16 mi) south of Kondinin in the central Wheatbelt region of Western Australia. It overlooks Jilakin Lake and is a prominent feature in the area, rising out of the surrounding flat plains.

The rock is an inselberg and is situated in the south western part of the Yilgarn craton.

The town of Kulin was gazetted as Jilakin in 1913, but the name was changed in 1914 when the railway to the town was completed.

There is a parking area and picnic tables at the base of the rock but no camping is permitted.

The site is home to a stand of jarrah trees at the base of the rock. They are the most isolated natural jarrah trees known, and are around 150 km (93 mi) east of the main jarrah belt. They survive on water that runs off the rock and quarry soils at the base of the rock. The trees were the reason the area was declared as an A Class Reserve in 1914 so that cutting of timber was prohibited. Other vegetation found to the eastern side of the site include: Eucalyptus transcontinentalis, Eucalyptus subangusta with patches of Eucalyptus salmonophloia and Eucalyptus salubris woodland.

The Noongar believe that the trees had grown as the result of two groups of Aboriginal people driving their spears into the ground when they met as a sign of friendship; the spears sprouted and grew as jarrah trees.

The area around the rock is also the home of the Blazing Swan, an annual Burning Man event that has been held in the area since 2014 at Easter time, attracting around 2,500 attendees.

The rock is part of a dreaming trail that extends from the south coast near Augusta to the Great Victoria Desert country to the north east. Other features along the trail include Mulka's Cave, Wave Rock, Puntapin Rock, Jitarning Rock and Dumbleyung Lake.

== See also ==
- Granite outcrops of Western Australia
