= Hippo's Yawn =

Rock in Western Australia

Coordinates: 32°26′33″S 118°54′18″E

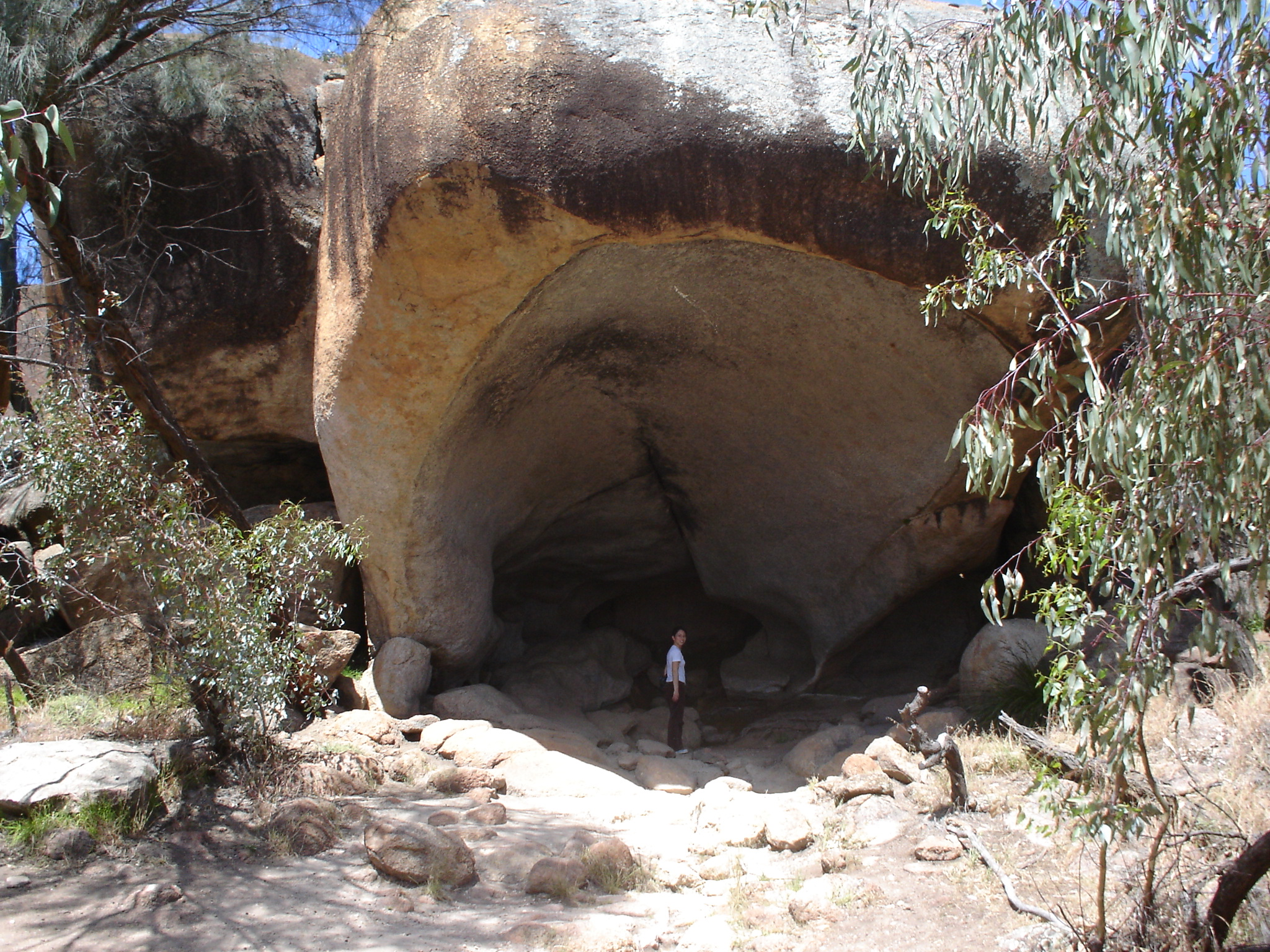
Hippo's Yawn

Hippo's Yawn is a rock near Wave Rock in Western Australia.

The rock's resemblance to a yawning hippopotamus led to its name.

It is about 12.6 metres (41 ft) tall and is located just outside of the town of Hyden, and is associated in travel literature with Wave Rock and other rocks.

== See also ==
- List of individual rocks
