= Blazing Swan =

Festival in Western Australia

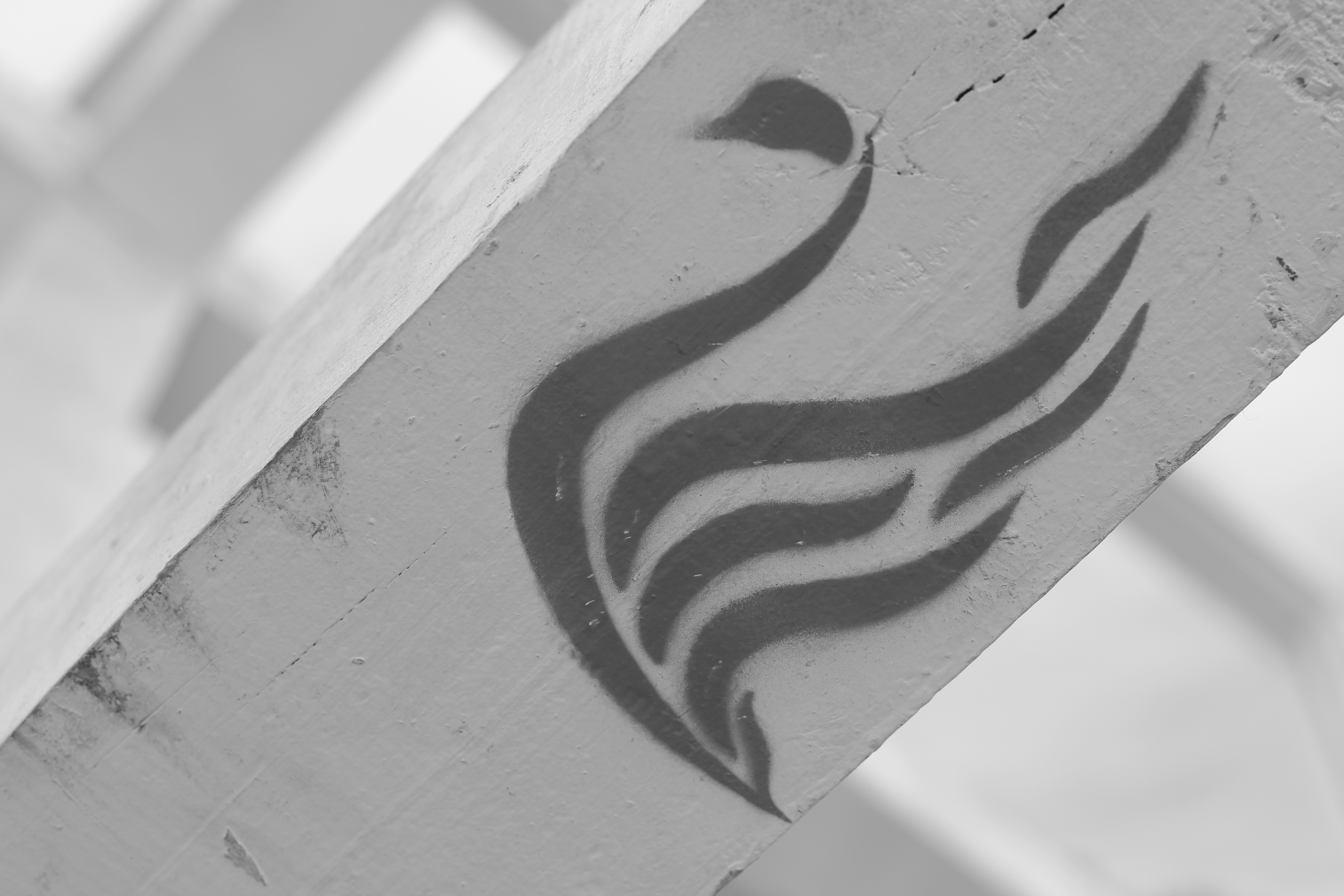
- Blazing Swan logo spray painted onto an art piece in 2015
- Location: Jilakin Rock City
- Inaugurated: 2013
- Most recent: March 27 – April 2, 2024
- Website: www.blazingswan.com.au

Blazing Swan is an annual regional Burning Man event held adjacent to Jilakin Lake near the town of Kulin, Western Australia. It is promoted as an experiment in temporary community and artistic expression, guided by eleven main principles, including radical inclusion, gifting and radical self-reliance.

The event occurs around Easter each year, usually over a period of seven days. The event location is on bushland adjacent to Jilakin Lake, and is referred to as Jilakin Rock City. A wooden effigy is built and burned at the culmination of the event.

== History ==
A collective of artists/producers who had attended the Burning Man Festival in the US, organized the official regional event in Western Australia.

Year	Theme	Date	Location	Participants	Ticket price	Notes
2013	Ignite	2 June	Bickley	~150		
2013	Syncronicity	1 September	Mosman Park	~250	$15-$30	
2014	Inception	24–28 April	Kulin	1400	$145–$195	
2015	Inspiration	1–7 April	Kulin	1900	$145–$255	
2016	Illumination	23–29 March	Kulin	2500	$150–$250	
2017	Elemental	12–18 April	Kulin	2700	$150–$250	
2018	Beyond the Black Stump	28 March – 3 April	Kulin	3200	$200–$300	
2019	Happy as Larry	17 - 23 April	Kulin	3000	$200–$300	
2020	Perception	8 - 14 April		N/A	$200–$300	Cancelled due to COVID-19 pandemic
2021	Phoenix	1 April - 6 April	Kulin	1500	$250–350	
2022	Poseidon's Flame	13 - 19 April		N/A	$250–350	Cancelled due to COVID-19 pandemic
2023	Poseidon's Flame II	5 April - 11 April	Kulin	3000	$290–350	
2024	Neon Caravan	27 March - 2 April	Kulin	3000	$400–475	
2025	Cosmic Coincidence	16 April - 22 April	Kulin	3000		
2026	Takes A Village	1 April - 7 April	Kulin	~3000	$450-5xx	

== Blazing Swan, Inc. ==
Blazing Swan, Inc. is the not-for-profit incorporated association dedicated to organizing the annual Blazing Swan event.

=== Community Involvement ===
Blazing Swan Inc has been involved with a number of community art projects and philanthropic activities in Western Australia. Some examples are:

- Providing significant art grants to the community to encourage creative expression.
- Donating $10 from each ticket sold at the 2015 event towards funding a full-time age care nurse to the Shire of Kulin.
- Partnership with the Australian Government's 'Work for the Dole' program, to help job seekers gain skills and experience that give back to the community and can help them find a job.
- Donating a three-metre-wide (9.8 ft) metal sculpture created by Matt Bray to the Shire of Kulin, as a permanent public art offering.
