= Flared slope =

Rock-wall with a smooth transition into a concavity at the foot zone

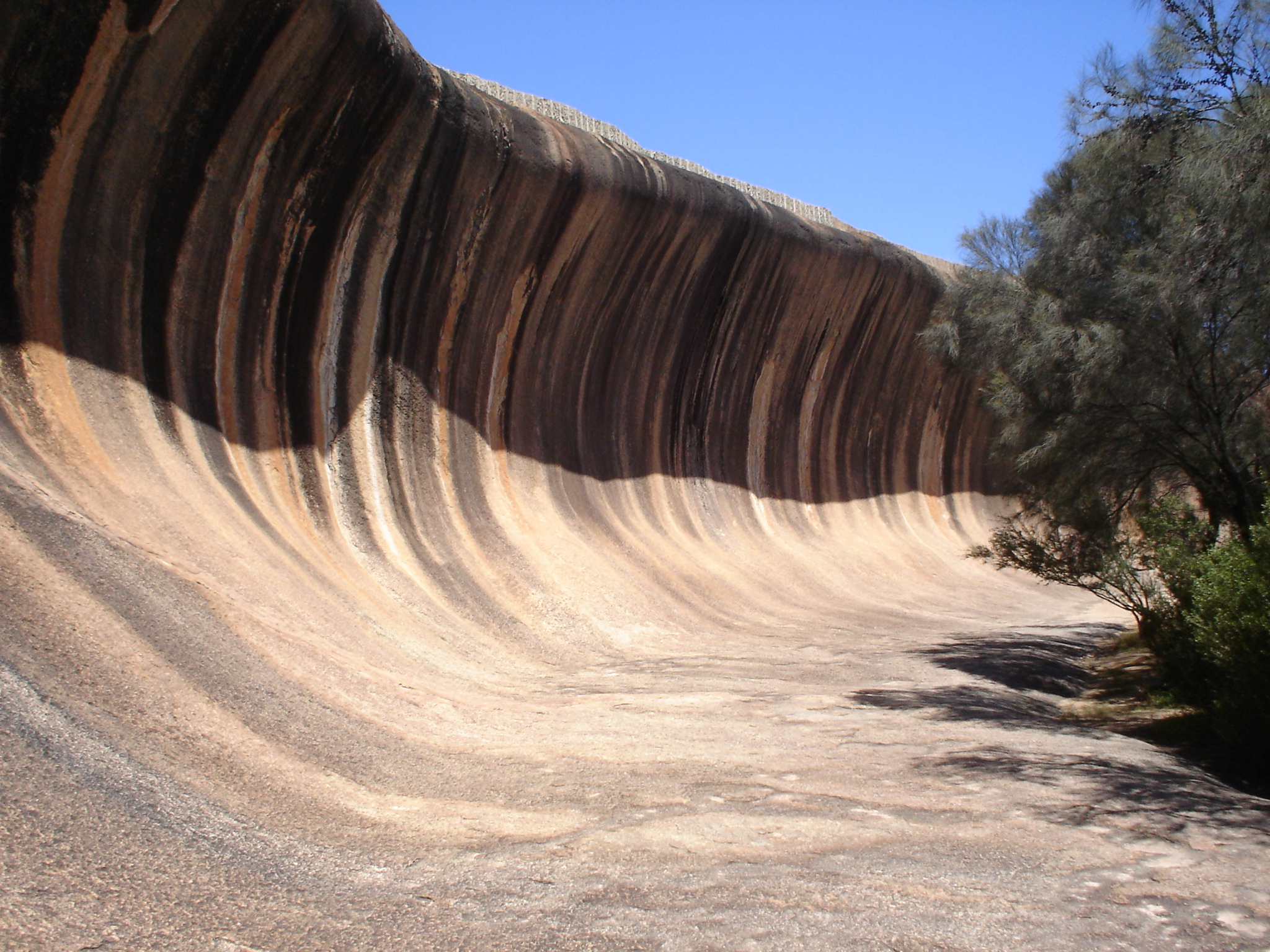
Picture of the Wave Rock, a landmark flared slope in Western Australia.

A flared slope is a landform consisting in a rock-wall with a smooth transition into a concavity at the foot zone. Flared slopes form due to various weathering patterns that are more effective at the regolith or soil-covered base of rock walls. These landforms are common in granitic rocks but can also occur in other rock types such as ignimbrite. Flared slopes are found in a variety of different lithological and climatic environments in Australia (including the notable example of Wave Rock), Spain, South Africa, and the western United States. Most flared slopes described in scientific literature are found in semi-arid climates. The existence of rocks and regolith that could form flared slopes if exhumed has been confirmed from various drillings in Australia.

== Formation ==
Fared slopes are formed by weathering processes that are controlled by water flow patterns, rock composition, and the local environment.

=== Water ===
Flared slopes can form when shallow groundwater erodes a rock's base faster than its upper layers exposed above ground. Particularly in granite rocks, subsurface groundwater weathering leads to multiple layers in the rock formation, creating different slopes and concavities within the same structure. This eroding of the lower layer (or "foot slope" or "scarp-foot zone") leaves the top of the rock unaffected giving a flared slope profile as the rock is further weathered.

Runoff can contribute greatly to the distinct features of a flared slope. The various ways water runoff contacts the rock allows for different patterns of erosion and features. The directional lines seen in many flared slopes indicate water flow over the structure and lead to different colors of exposed rock layers.

=== Rock composition ===
Rock composition plays an important role in how a rock is weathered. Because flared slopes tend to be made of granite, the weathering process is very slow because granite is resistant to water penetration. Loose material and weak areas of the rock allow faster weathering, causing a slight retreating concavity in the footslope of the rock. With the more resistant rock taking longer to weather, groundwater has time to penetrate weak points underground, removing subsurface material faster than exposed surface rock. Enough iterations of this process leads to significant concaving of the structure as it erodes farther into the rock.

=== Surroundings ===
The local environment also influences flared slope weathering patterns. External factors that lead to a decrease in moisture and water in a given area of a rock can cause it to weather improperly. Presence of poorly developed flared slopes next to well developed flared slopes cause them to act as obstacles or blocks that attribute to diverse runoff and weathering patterns. Similarly, certain areas have concentrated runoff that deprive them of moisture and form inclined bedrock structures instead of flared slopes.

== Wave Rock ==
A classic example of flared slopes is the renowned Wave Rock in Western Australia. Part of a larger inselberg, Hyden Rock, Wave Rock holds many distinct characteristics that make it a target for understanding flared slope formations. Because Wave Rock contains various distinct shapes and curves within its structure, it is thought to have formed from multiple processes, including due to marine erosion, sand blasting, and water erosion. Wave Rock has likely experienced subaerial weathering by rain, frost, and river water. As water flows over the cliff, it carries sediments and chemicals that contribute to weathering of the rock's inner face as the water runs vertically downward. As time progresses, sediments accumulate at the base of the slope and carve a concave shape into the rock, with vertical lines indicating runoff erosion that expose different colors of the granite.
