= Jilakin Lake =

Lake in Western Australia

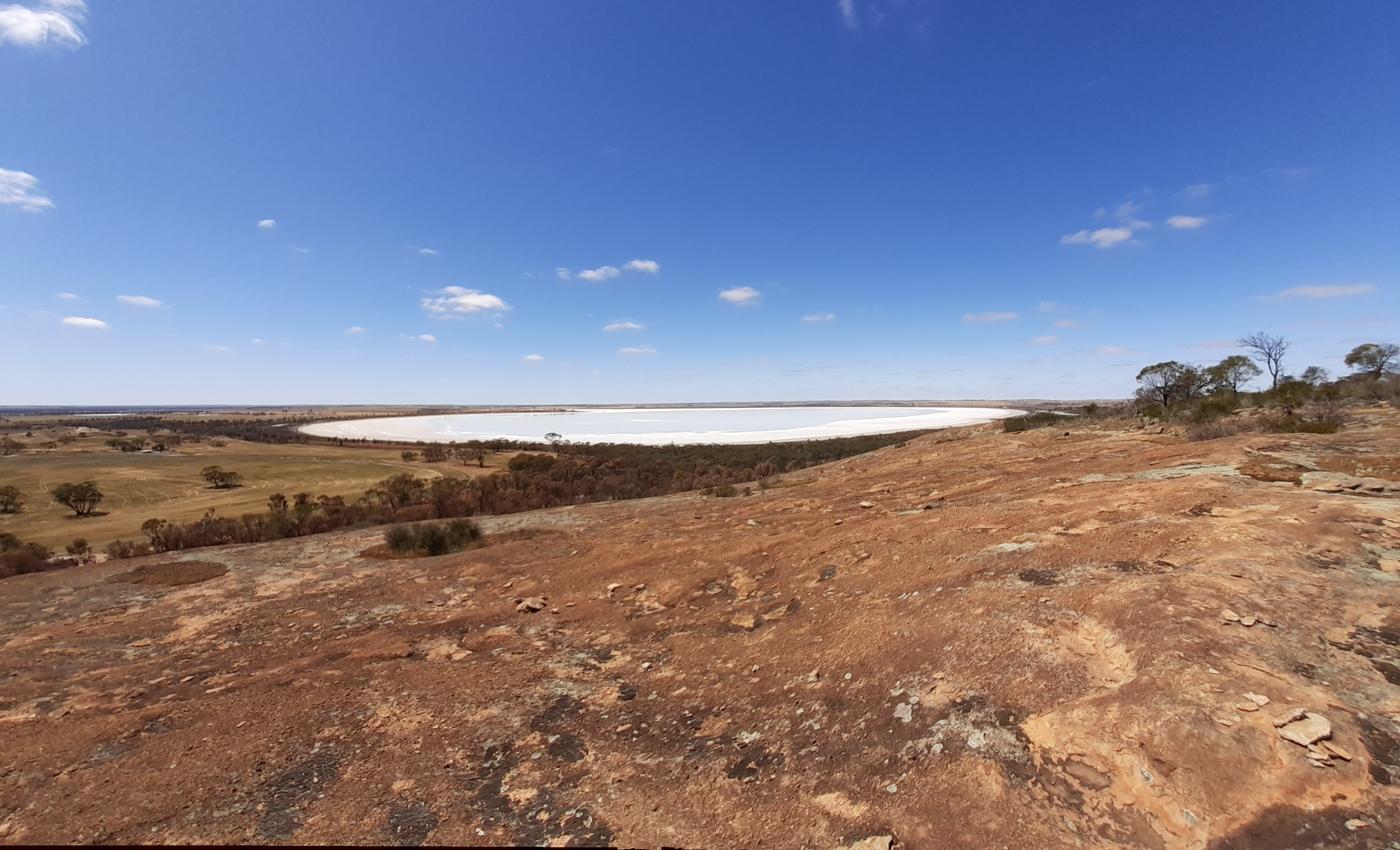
- Jilakin Lake seen from Jilakin Rock in October 2020

- Location in Western Australia
- Interactive map of Jilakin Lake
- Location: Wheatbelt, Western Australia
- Coordinates: 32.66259°S 118.35592°E
- Type: saline
- Primary inflows: Groundwater and surface runoff
- Basin countries: Australia
- Surface elevation: 264 m (866 ft)

Jilakin Lake is an ephemeral salt water lake found about 20 km (12 mi) east of Kulin in the Wheatbelt region of Western Australia.

The lake is situated adjacent to Jilakin Rock.

== See also ==
- List of lakes of Australia § Western Australia
