= Elephant Rocks (Western Australia) =

Beach in Western Australia

Coordinates: 35°1′32.41″S 117°14′7.24″E

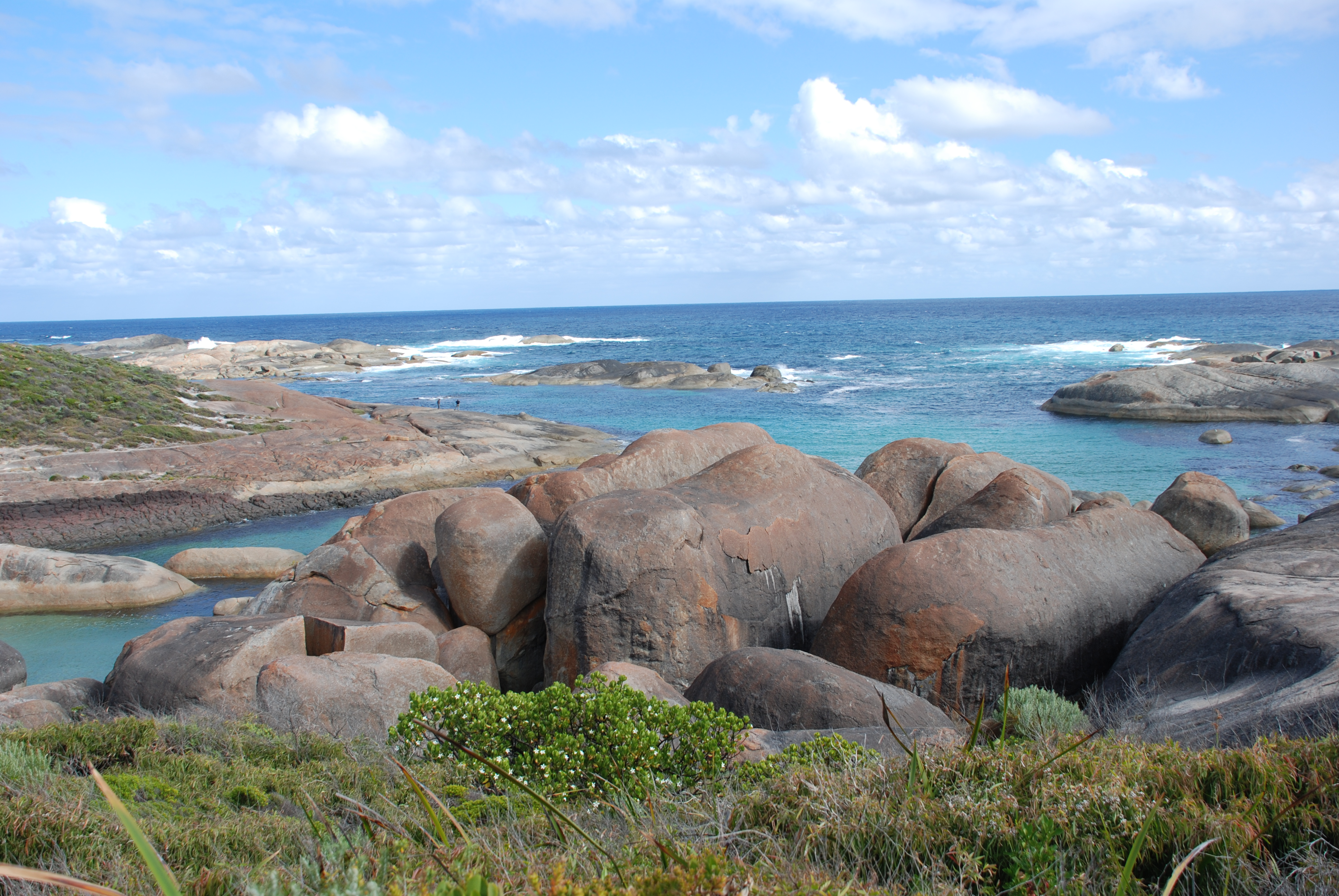
Elephant Rocks

Elephant Rocks is a sheltered beach in Western Australia, a few hundred metres east of Greens Pool. It is about 15 kilometres (9 mi) from Denmark, in William Bay National Park. Its name is derived from a series of exposed rocks, which from several angles resembles a herd of elephants. At the Elephant Rocks, people can bushwalk, fish, snorkel and swim.

== Formation ==
The Elephant Rocks are granite boulders that resemble a herd of elephants, extending at least 100 meters out to the sea along the coast between Greens Pool and Madfish Bay.

As one of the oldest rocks in the world, the granite rocks along the south coast of Western Australia started forming around 1.5 billion years ago. The collision of two continents led to the integration of various rock formations part of the Albany-Fraser orogeny. 600 million years ago, the region was home to a mountain range that exceeded the height of the Himalayas. The erosion of the rocks altered the landscape, exposing the rocks located deep within the mountain's foundation, close to the Earth's mantle. The deep rocks were subject to the pressures and temperatures causing them to melt and recrystallize, forming granites and migmatites.
