= Datjoin Rock =

Rock formation in wheatbelt of Western Australia

Coordinates: 30°26′29″S 118°04′05″E

Datjoin Rock, also known as Brockman's hide and Brockman's hideout, is a granite rock formation located approximately 19 kilometres (12 mi) east of Beacon and approximately 5 kilometres (3.1 mi) northwest of Wialki in the eastern Wheatbelt region of Western Australia.

It is one of the rocks within the Datjoin Well and Rock Reserve which has several unique rock formations. The land was leased to pastoralists in 1872 and the nearby well was built by sandalwood cutters in the early 1900s. From July to October the reserve is a popular picnic and tourist camping spot with abundant orchids and wildflowers.

The place is also known as Brockman's hideout as it is the place where Lionel Brockman set up a makeshift shelter for his wife and twelve children in caves around the base of the rock as he evaded police for over three months in 1970.

== See also ==
- Granite outcrops of Western Australia
