= William Bay National Park =

National park in Western Australia

- IUCN category II (national park)
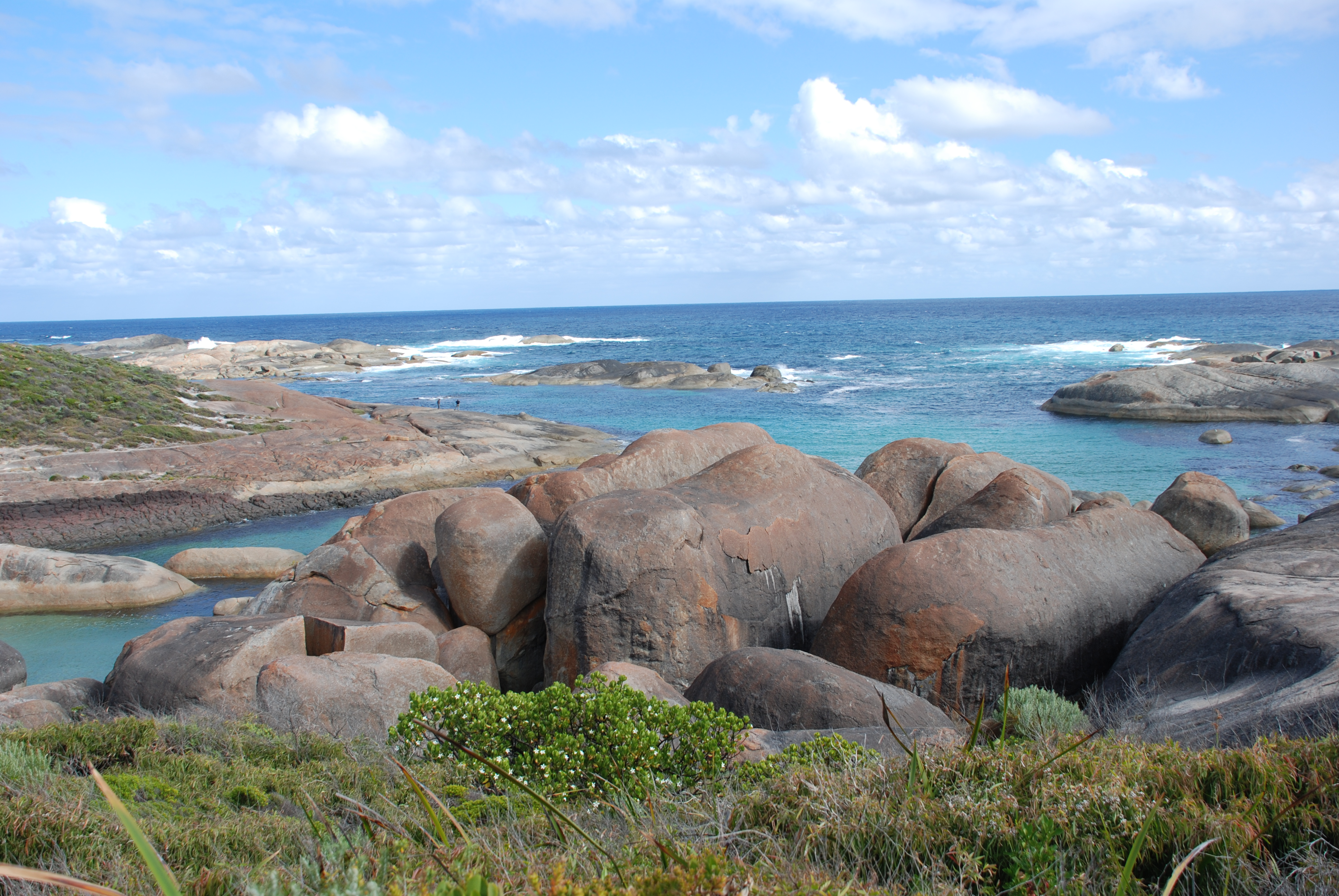
- Elephant Rocks

- Location within Western Australia
- Location: Western Australia
- Nearest city: Denmark
- Coordinates: 35°01′35″S 117°14′06″E
- Area: 17.34 km^{2} (6.70 sq mi)
- Established: 1971
- Governing body: Department of Parks and Wildlife
- Website: Official website

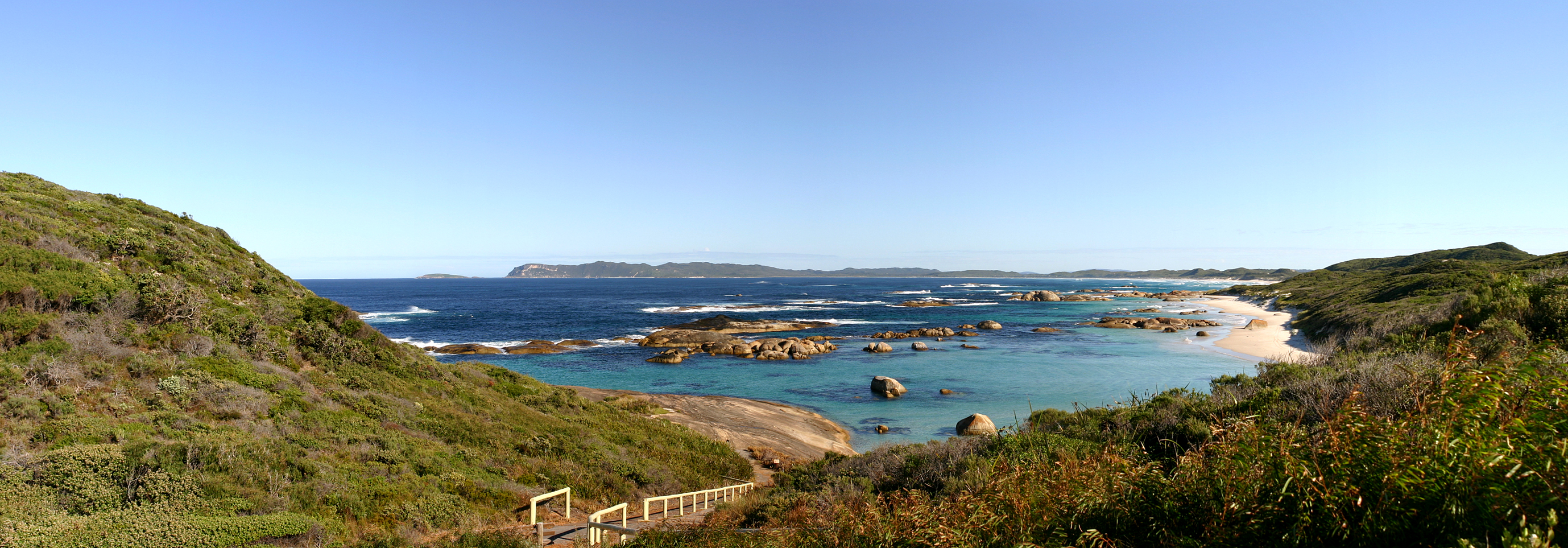
Greens Pool, William Bay

William Bay National Park is a national park in the Great Southern region of Western Australia, 369 km (229 mi) southeast of Perth and between the towns of Denmark and Walpole.

== Description ==
Situated approximately 15 km (9 mi) west of Denmark, William Bay National Park covers 1,734 ha (4,280 acres) and includes Greens Pool and Elephant Rocks. The granite boulders create a natural reef which protects Greens Pool from the Great Southern Ocean, and a safe swimming beach for children who are under supervision. William Bay National Park is located along the south coast of Western Australia along the Rainbow Coast, and is in the Shire of Denmark. The park also contains areas of peppermint scrub, dense heathland, pockets of karri forest, Eucalyptus woodlands, Parry Inlet, lakes, tall hills with granite tors and outcrops.

Coastal areas at the eastern side of the park include Greens Pool, Elephant Rocks, Madfish Bay and Madfish Island, Waterfall Beach. The wilder and less dramatic features along the coast of the western side include Parry Beach, Parry Inlet, Mazoletti Beach and Hillier Bay.

Fishing is popular along the rocks and beaches, with many different species found, including King George whiting, herring, Australian salmon and mulloway. Bushwalking is another popular activity to enjoy the views with numerous tracks around the park.

== History ==
The traditional owners of the area are the Mineng people; Aboriginal Australians have inhabited the area for between 40,000 and 50,000 years. Artefacts including pieces of stone tools have been found in the park at Lights Beach, Lake Byleveld and Parry Inlet.

William Bay was named after the famed British Arctic explorer and navigator, Sir William Edward Parry, as were two other nearby features, Parry Inlet and Edward Point. The bay was named in the 1830s by John Septimus Roe.

The area was declared as a national park in 1971 with an area of 4,644 acres (1,879 ha).

A small reserve with an area of 29.5 ha (73 acres) located near the north east end of the park that encompasses Lake Bylveld was added to the park in the 1980s.

The park is a popular tourist destination, with 137,000 visitors in 2006–2007, 208,000 in 2010-2011 and 238,000 visitors in 2014–2015.

== Fauna ==
Birds found within the park area and surrounds include several species of honeyeaters, white-breasted robins, red-eared fire tails, western rosella and red-capped parrot. Migratory waterbirds that visit the park include the threatened species; Australasian bittern, hooded plover and little bittern.

The rare and ancient assassin spider, currently listed as threatened, was found to inhabit the park during a survey conducted in 2008.

== See also ==
- Protected areas of Western Australia
