= Baladjie Rock =

Granite rock formation in Western Australia

Coordinates: 30°57′18″S 118°52′35″E

Baladjie Rock is a granite rock formation located approximately 42 kilometres (26 mi) north of Westonia and approximately 55 kilometres (34 mi) north west of Southern Cross in the eastern Wheatbelt region of Western Australia and is part of the Baladjie Lake Nature Reserve. The reserve is situated within the Great Western Woodlands and is adjacent to the southern edge of the Baladjie salt lake system.

The name of the rock is Aboriginal in origin but the meaning is not known. The spelling has been given as Balahgin, Baladgin, Balajie and Baladgee. The town of Baldjie that was established in 1928 took its name from the rock.

== See also ==
- Granite outcrops of Western Australia
