= Wave Rock =

Rock formation in Western Australia

Wave Rock Katter Kich
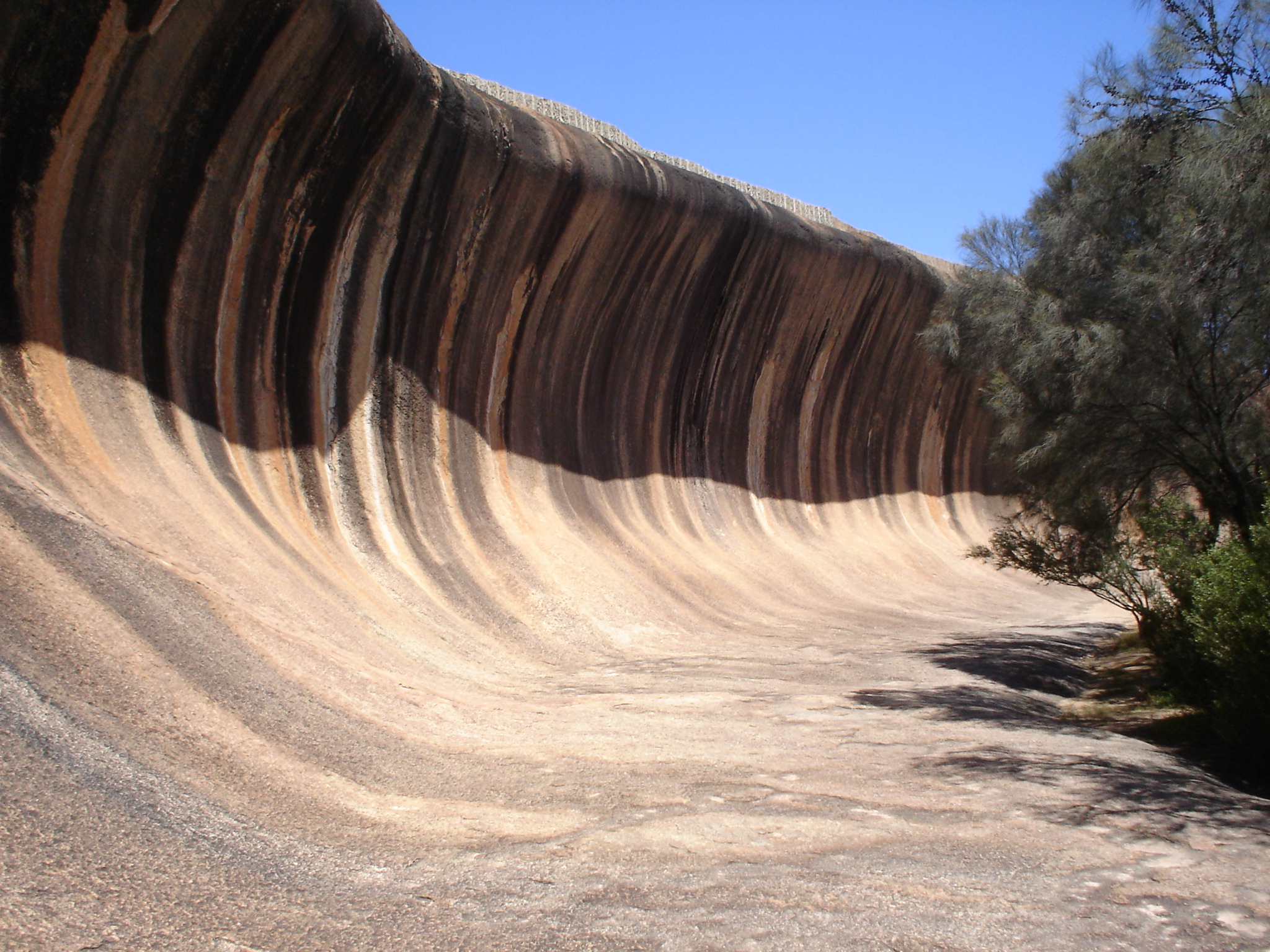

- Coordinates: 32°26′38″S 118°53′54″E
- Country: Australia
- State: Western Australia
- Location: 3 km (1.9 mi) E of Hyden; 296 km (184 mi) ESE of Perth

Designations

Western Australia Heritage Register
- Official name: Wave Rock & Environs
- Type: Aboriginal Heritage Sites Register
- Designated: 21 August 1995
- Reference no.: 4466
- Status: Registered

Register of the National Estate
- Official name: Wave Rock and Environs
- Type: Natural
- Reference no.: 17137
- Place File Number: 5/06/099/0004

Wave Rock (Nyungar: Katter Kich) is a natural rock formation that is shaped like a tall breaking ocean wave. The "wave" is about 15 m (50 ft) high and around 110 m (360 ft) long. It forms the north side of a solitary hill, which is known as "Hyden Rock". This hill, which is a granite inselberg, lies about 3 km (2 mi) east of the small town of Hyden and 296 km (184 mi) east-southeast of Perth, Western Australia. Wave Rock and Hyden Rock are part of a 160 ha (395-acre) nature reserve, Hyden Wildlife Park. More than 100,000 tourists visit every year.

== Dam ==
A wall lies above Wave Rock about halfway up Hyden Rock and follows the contours of the rock surface. It collects and funnels rainwater to a storage dam. The wall and dam were constructed in December 1928 by the Public Works Department for the colonist settlers of East Karlgarin District. Both were renovated in 1951 to increase water capacity for the Hyden township. Such walls are common on many similar rocks in the Wheatbelt.

The wall has become damaged over time. According to local Noongar man and tour guide Michael Ward, the wall above the top of Wave Rock has caused the rock to change colour over time. He has said that in the early days of the wall, the rock was lighter yellow or cream in colour, and that the wall has helped it to become red and orange with black streaking across its face.

== Dreamtime ==
Wave Rock has cultural significance to Ballardong people, who call it Katter Kich. Local tribes believed that wave rock was a creation of the Rainbow Serpent, and was created in her wake by dragging her swollen body over the land after she had consumed all of the water in the land. They respected this area as an icon of cultural learning; a moral from this Dreamtime tale was to be remembered for life. The rock is part of a dreaming trail that extends from the south coast near Augusta to the Great Victoria Desert country to the north east. Other features along the trail include Mulka's Cave, Puntapin Rock, Jilakin Rock, Jitarning Rock and Dumbleyung Lake.

== Geomorphology ==
Hyden Rock, of which Wave Rock is part, consists of 2.63 billion year-old biotite K-feldspar porphyritic monzogranite that is part of the Yilgarn Craton. Hyden Rock is a granite inselberg, which consists of three domes. The central and western domes are separated by a deep valley, which is now occupied by a reservoir. The central and eastern domes are linked by a low platform. A multistage process of landform development created these domes. The initial step in the development of Hyden Rock was the subsurface alteration by weathering of granite bedrock beneath a lateritised land surface during the Cretaceous Period between 100 and 130 million years ago. Depending on the degree to which it was fractured by jointing, the granite bedrock underlying this surface was altered to varying depths beneath the land surface. This process formed underground "domes" of solid granite bedrock surrounded by deeply weathered, relatively loose, and disaggregated granite. Following separation of Australia and Antarctica and accompanying tilting of what became southwestern Australia, periodic erosion of the deeply weathered granite, which underlaid the surrounding land surface, exposed these buried solid bedrock domes over time as Hyden Rock.

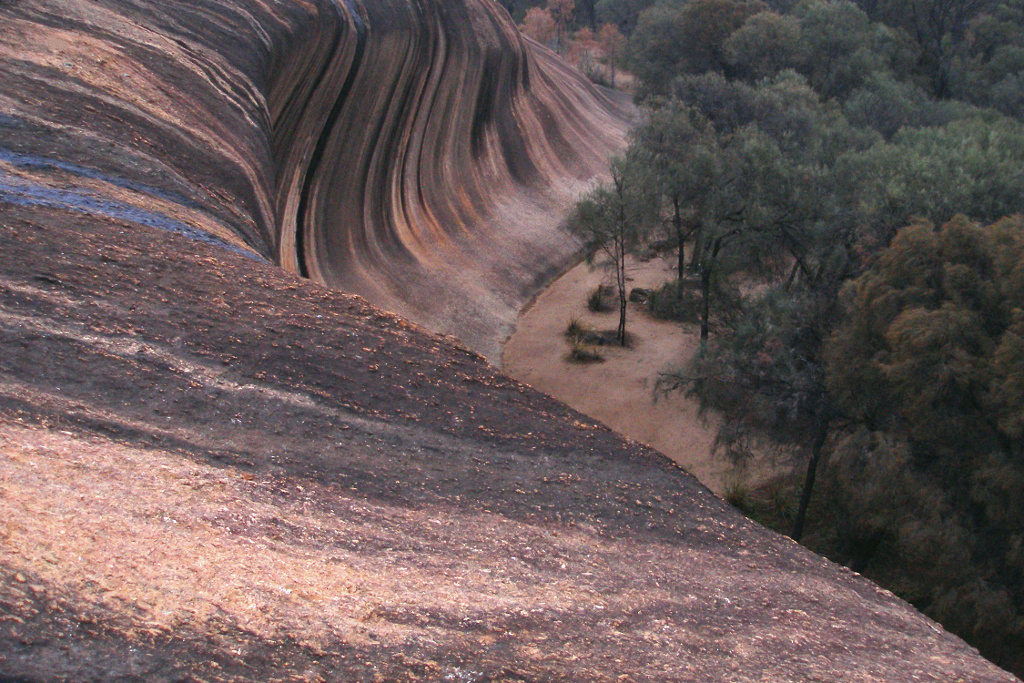
View from the top

Wave Rock is a good example of what geomorphologists call a "flared slope". A flared slope is a concave-upward or -inward bedrock surface that is typically found around the base of inselbergs, bornhardts, and granitic boulders and also on their higher slopes. Flared slopes like Wave Rock are particularly well developed in granitic landforms of south-western and southern Australia. The flared slopes are argued to have formed by the concentrated chemical weathering around the base of an inselberg by groundwater. The chemical weathering of the bedrock by groundwater produces a concave-upward or –inward pocket of deeply weathered, relatively loose, and disaggregated bedrock within the formerly solid bedrock base of an inselberg. When the land surface, which is underlain by deeply weathered bedrock, around an inselberg is lowered by erosion, the pocket of deeply weathered disaggregated bedrock is also removed to produce a flared slope such as Wave Rock. It has also been argued that flared slopes can form during the erosion of slopes of any inselbergs.

== Nearby features ==
Other notable rock formations in the area include Hippos Yawn and The Humps.

== In popular culture ==
Wave Rock hosts the nearby Wave Rock Weekender event, a music festival that has been held annually since 2006.

Wave Rock features on the album artwork for Japanese Jazz-fusion band T-Square's 1987 studio album, Truth.

== See also ==
- List of individual rocks
