= Greens Pool =

Beach in Western Australia

Coordinates: 35°1′27″S 117°14′6″E

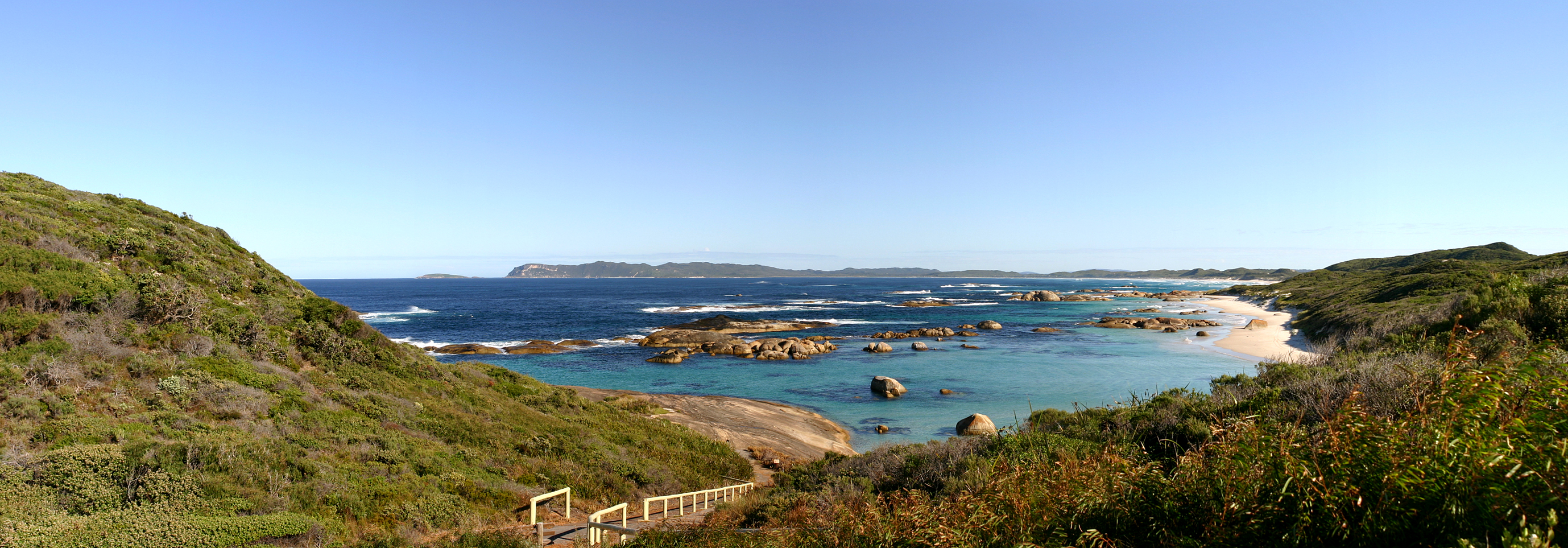
Greens Pool, William Bay, Denmark WA

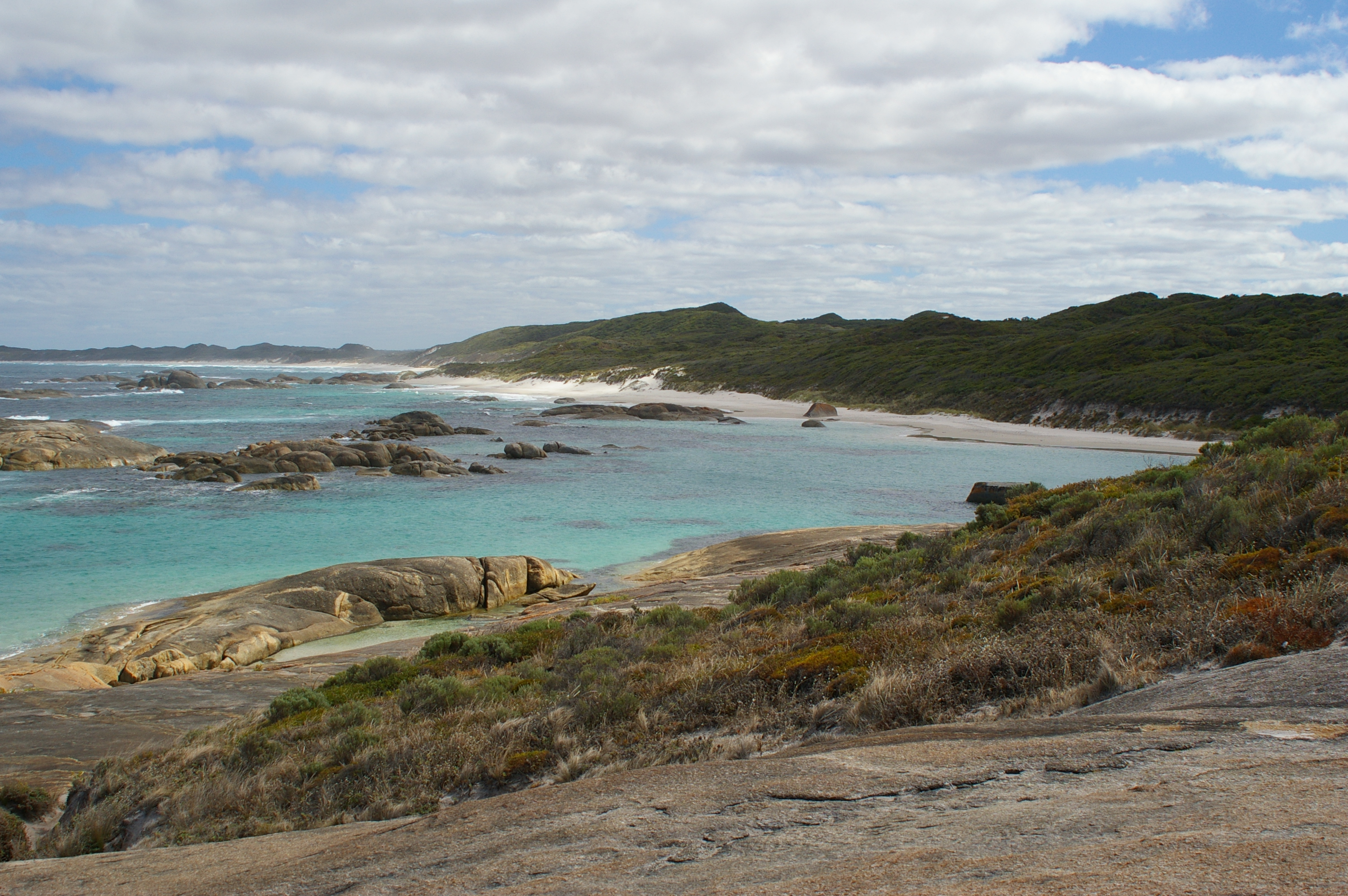
Greens Pool from the eastern side

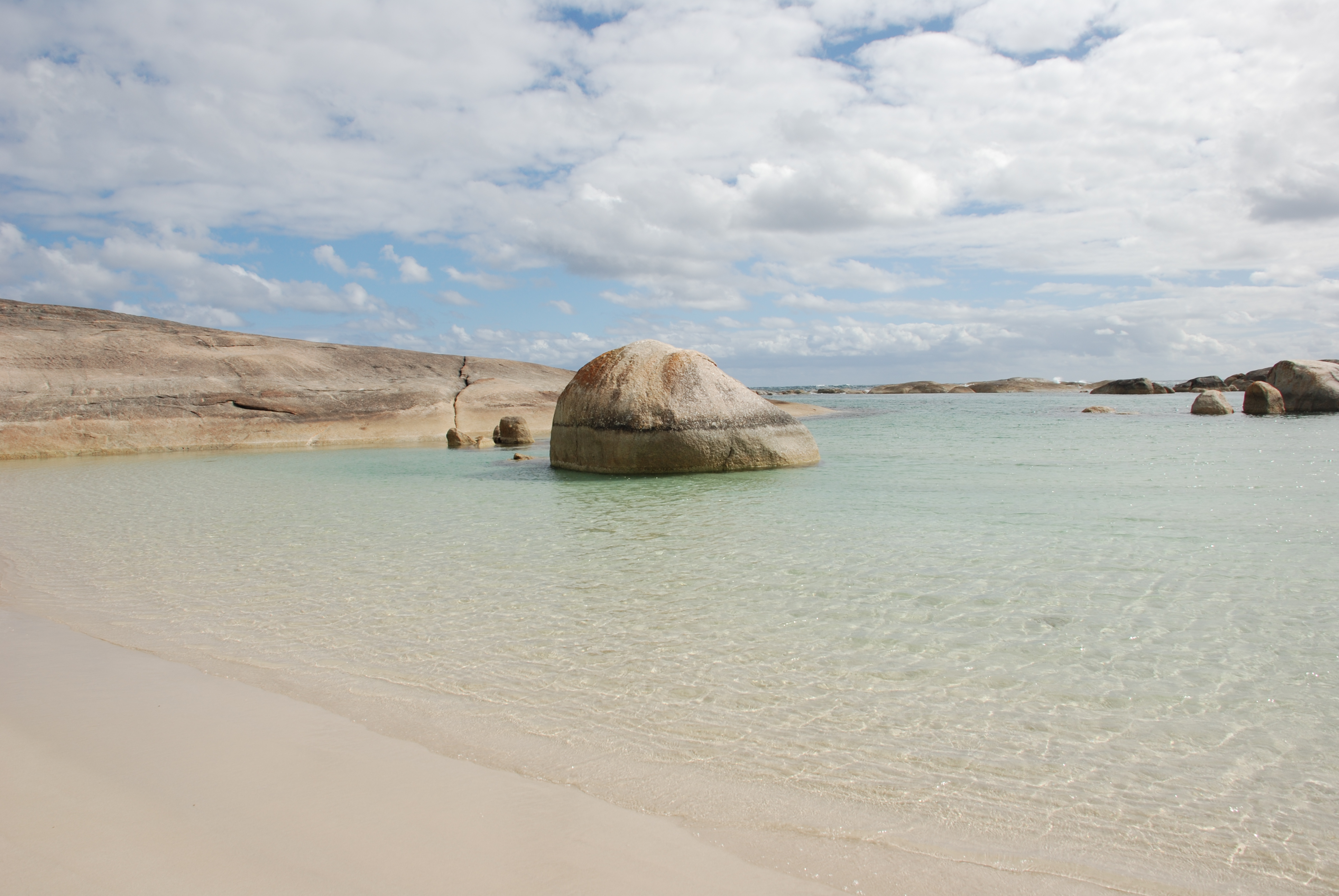
Greens pool granite boulders

Greens Pool is a sandy white beach with boulders on the south coast of Western Australia between Denmark and Walpole. This sheltered area is part of William Bay National Park and has a sandy white beach ringed by large granite boulders that prevent the swell of the Southern Ocean reaching the shoreline.

The pool is roughly 560 m (1,840 ft) long from east to west and 290 m (950 ft) at its widest point from the beach to the protective rocks.

Early settlers of the region used the beach location for outings and picnics.

The area has a car park, viewing platform and toilet facility with a reasonably steep sandy path down to the beach.

The granitic rocks along much of the south coast formed 1.5 billion years ago, placing them among some of the oldest rocks in the world. As the Australian continent collided with Antarctica, the rocks along the south coast became part of the Albany-Fraser Orogen, and 600 million years ago the area was a massive mountain range. The mountains eroded away long ago and the remaining rocks were once deep down in the base of the range. The high pressures and temperatures these rocks experienced during the mountain building event caused them to melt then recrystallise, forming granitic gneisses and migmatites, which are referred to as granites.

The pool is a popular tourist attraction within the National Park; in 1993-1994 the park had 110,000 visitors, and in 2011-2012 the park had some 218,105 visitors. In 2020, Greens Pool was ranked 13 in TripAdvisor's Top 25 Beaches in the South Pacific

Greens Pool was named to honour Police Inspector John Green, who was originally a farmer in Denmark. His son, Victor Green, drowned in nearby Wilson Inlet in 1922, and often used to fish at the pool. It was originally known as Green's Pool but the Lands Department dropped the apostrophe for many place names although the letter "s" was retained. Robert Byleveld constructed the first track to Greens Pool in the early 1920s when most of William Bay was inaccessible and visited infrequently.

Many species of fish inhabit the area, including; estuary cobbler, southern garfish, species of flathead, southern blue devil, King George whiting, skipjack trevally and Australian herring.
