= Hyden, Western Australia =

Hyden
- Town
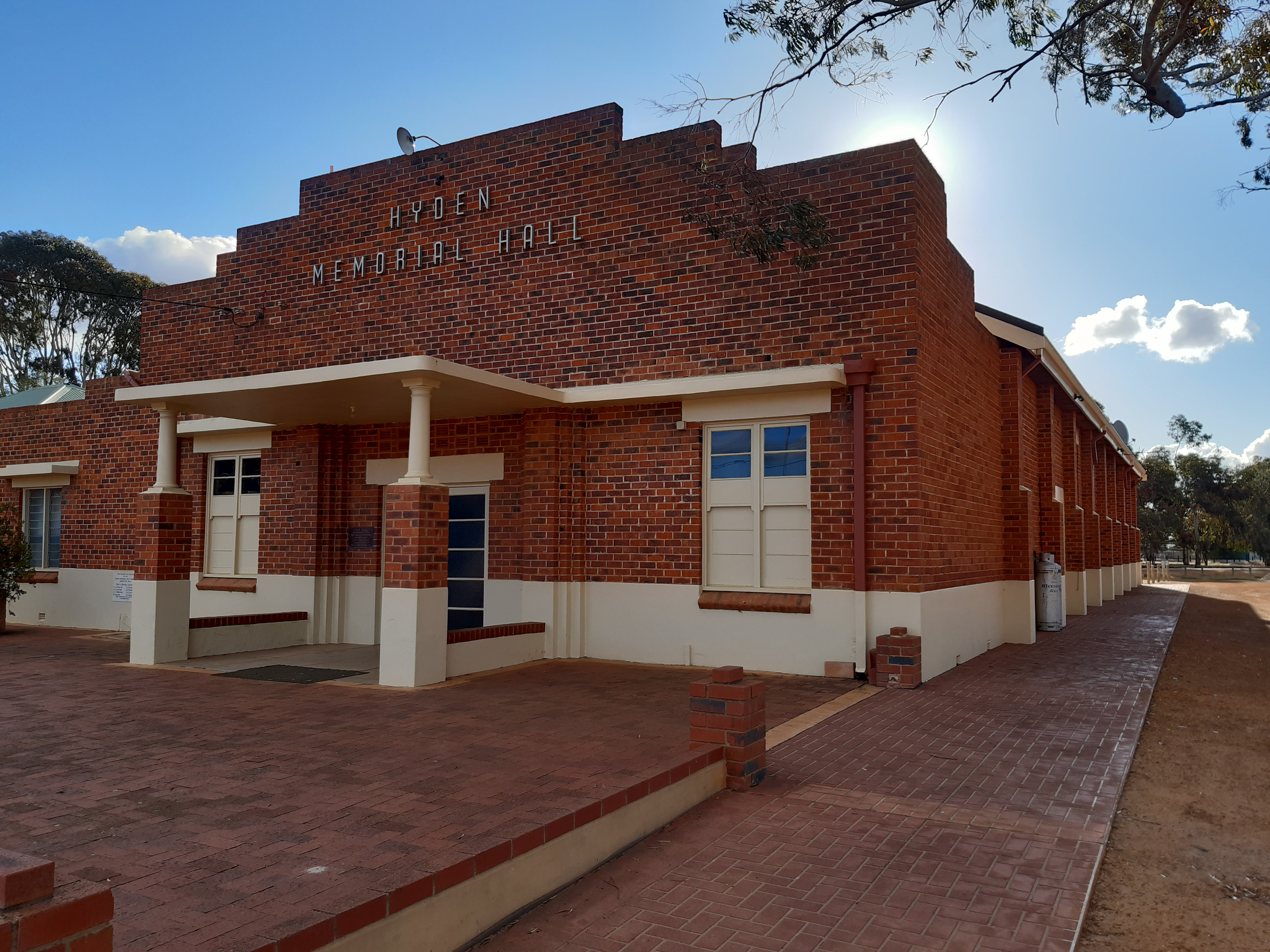
- The Hyden Memorial Hall in 2020

- Interactive map of Hyden
- Coordinates: 32.45°S 118.86°E
- Country: Australia
- State: Western Australia
- LGA: Shire of Kondinin
- Location: 292 km (181 mi) ESE of Perth; 56 km (35 mi) E of Kondinin; 121 km (75 mi) SE of Merredin
- Established: 1922

Government
  - State electorate: Wagin
  - Federal division: O'Connor

Area
  - Total: 2,024.8 km^{2} (781.8 sq mi)
- Elevation: 210 m (690 ft)

Population
  - Total: 384 (SAL 2021)
- Postcode: 6359
- Mean max temp: 25.1 °C (77.2 °F)
- Mean min temp: 9.9 °C (49.8 °F)
- Annual rainfall: 342.9 mm (13.50 in)

Hyden is a country town in the eastern Wheatbelt of south-west Western Australia. It lies 292 kilometres (181 mi) east-south-east of Perth, in the Shire of Kondinin. Established as an agricultural centre in the early 20th century, the town also benefits from mining and tourism.

== History ==
The traditional owners of the area are the Aboriginal Australian group the Njakinjaki people, who have inhabited the region for thousands of years. The many granite outcrops, land formations, waterways as well as flora and fauna are still culturally significant to them.

Sandalwood cutters were thought to be the earliest European visitors in the area.

The land in the surrounding area was opened up for agriculture in the 1920s. A railway line was opened between Lake Grace and Hyden Rock in April 1933. The townsite was gazetted in 1932 following demand for land around the railway terminus.

The first wheat crop was harvested in Hyden in 1927.

The Hyden Progress Association was established prior to 1931 when the town was home to about 100 settlers. In 1931 the town had another large wheat crop, which was transported from the railway terminus at Lake Grace. The town was being surveyed and already had an oil depot, tea rooms and an agency with a store being constructed. A large catchment of water had also been built at Hyden Rock.

In 1933 the Progress Association built a pavilion at the existing sports ground and plans were made to construct a town hall. The hall was completed prior to 1935.

In August 1998, the Wave Rock airstrip opened.

== Economy ==
=== Agriculture ===
The town's economy continues to rely on agriculture, mostly in the form of cattle and sheep production that by 2008 had a value of approximately A$35 million. The surrounding areas produce wheat and other cereal crops. The town is a grain receival site for CBH Group.

=== Tourism ===
Around 100,000 tourists visit the town throughout the year while travelling to Wave Rock, which is 4 kilometres (2.5 mi) to the east of the townsite. Other visitors arrive during the wildflower season between September and December to see the many wildflower species that bloom at the time and different birds that feed on the blossom.

Local tourist attractions include Wave Rock, Mulka's Cave and Hippo's Yawn. Wave Rock Wildlife Park is located in Hyden, and is set in 3 hectares (7.4 acres) of natural bushland. The inhabitants include: koalas, wombats, kangaroos, wallabies, bettongs, possums, alpacas, camels, donkeys and a variety of birds such as emus, owls and swans. Native lizards freely inhabit the park and a cafe is on site for visitors.

== Geography ==
=== Climate ===
Hyden has a semi-arid climate (Köppen: BSk); with hot, dry summers and mild, slightly wetter winters. On average, the town receives 133.1 clear days and 92.2 cloudy days per annum. Extreme temperatures ranged from 48.6 °C (119.5 °F) on 3 February 2007 to −5.6 °C (21.9 °F) on 28 July 1982. The wettest recorded day was 7 December 2011 with 47.6 mm (1.87 in) of rainfall.

Climate data for Hyden (32.44°S 118.90°E) (299 m (981 ft) AMSL) (1928-2025)
Month	Jan	Feb	Mar	Apr	May	Jun	Jul	Aug	Sep	Oct	Nov	Dec	Year
Record high °C (°F)	47.0 (116.6)	48.6 (119.5)	44.0 (111.2)	39.1 (102.4)	34.0 (93.2)	27.7 (81.9)	25.0 (77.0)	31.2 (88.2)	34.5 (94.1)	39.3 (102.7)	44.0 (111.2)	47.0 (116.6)	48.6 (119.5)
Mean daily maximum °C (°F)	33.9 (93.0)	33.2 (91.8)	30.0 (86.0)	25.6 (78.1)	21.0 (69.8)	17.5 (63.5)	16.5 (61.7)	17.7 (63.9)	20.7 (69.3)	25.1 (77.2)	28.5 (83.3)	32.1 (89.8)	25.1 (77.3)
Mean daily minimum °C (°F)	15.6 (60.1)	15.9 (60.6)	14.3 (57.7)	11.1 (52.0)	7.5 (45.5)	5.6 (42.1)	4.6 (40.3)	4.8 (40.6)	6.0 (42.8)	8.4 (47.1)	11.5 (52.7)	13.9 (57.0)	9.9 (49.9)
Record low °C (°F)	5.7 (42.3)	5.8 (42.4)	2.5 (36.5)	−1.0 (30.2)	−2.8 (27.0)	−4.0 (24.8)	−5.6 (21.9)	−3.0 (26.6)	−2.4 (27.7)	−1.0 (30.2)	1.3 (34.3)	2.0 (35.6)	−5.6 (21.9)
Average precipitation mm (inches)	19.3 (0.76)	20.3 (0.80)	22.4 (0.88)	24.5 (0.96)	38.3 (1.51)	47.6 (1.87)	47.4 (1.87)	41.5 (1.63)	27.1 (1.07)	21.4 (0.84)	19.5 (0.77)	13.8 (0.54)	342.9 (13.50)
Average precipitation days (≥ 0.2 mm)	2.9	3.1	3.7	5.0	8.1	11.8	12.8	11.2	8.0	5.8	4.4	3.1	79.9
Average afternoon relative humidity (%)	28	29	34	42	51	57	58	55	47	36	32	29	42
Average dew point °C (°F)	9.8 (49.6)	10.4 (50.7)	10.1 (50.2)	9.9 (49.8)	8.6 (47.5)	7.6 (45.7)	6.8 (44.2)	6.8 (44.2)	6.9 (44.4)	6.4 (43.5)	7.3 (45.1)	8.7 (47.7)	8.3 (46.9)
Source: Bureau of Meteorology (1928-2025)
