= The Humps =

Granite rock formation in Western Australia

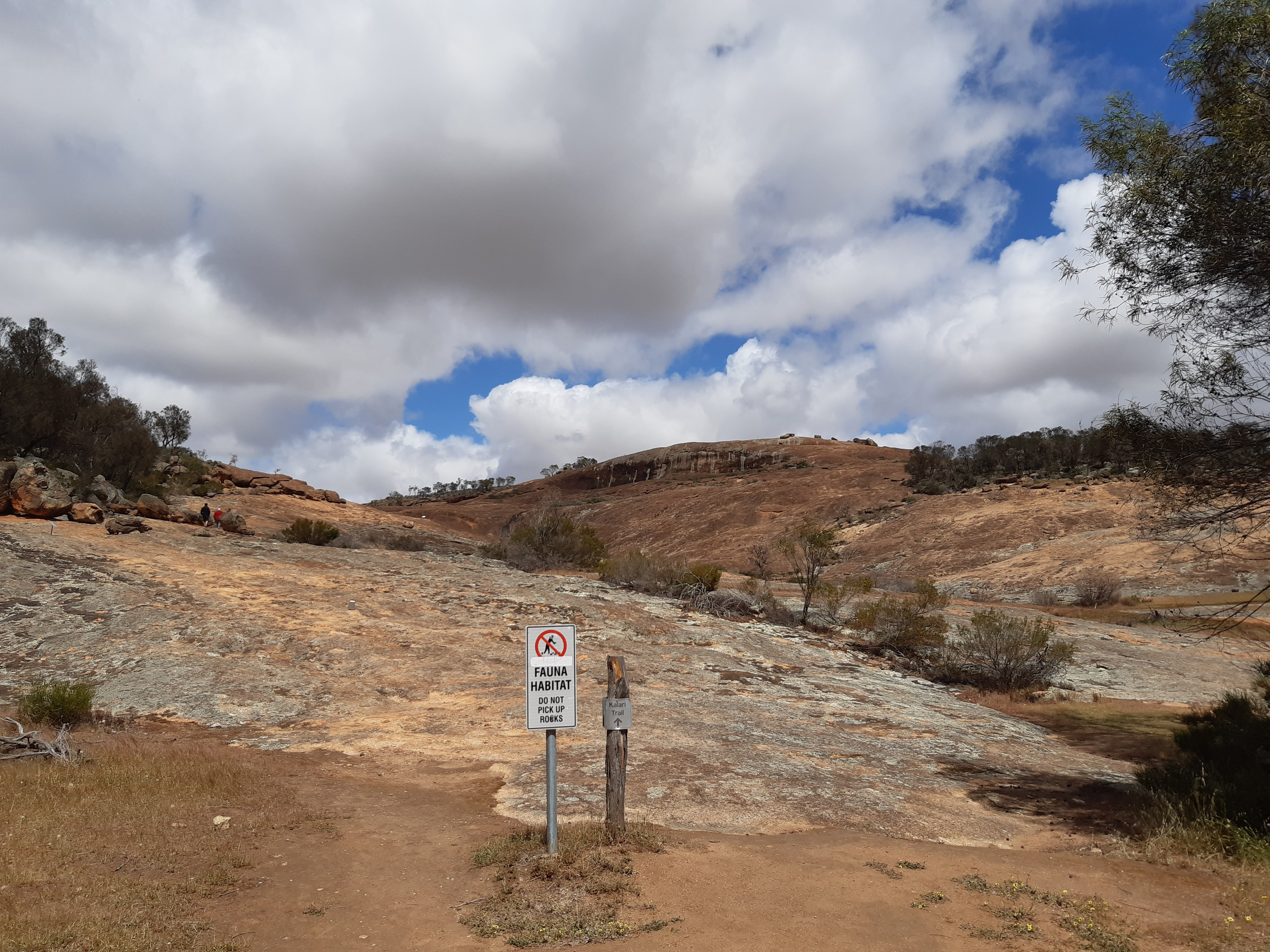
- The Humps in 2020

Highest point
- Elevation: 335 m (1,099 ft)
- Prominence: 80 m (260 ft)
- Coordinates: 32°19′11″S 118°57′20″E

Geography
- Location: Shire of Kondinin, Wheatbelt, Western Australia

The Humps are situated approximately 295 kilometres (183 mi) east of Perth

The Humps is a granite rock formation known as a "stepped bornhardt inselberg". It is located within The Humps Nature Reserve approximately 295 kilometres (183 mi) east of Perth and 17 kilometres (11 mi) north east of Hyden in the eastern wheatbelt region of Western Australia.

Rising about 80 metres (260 ft) above the surrounding plains, The Humps is one of numerous rock formations in the area. Approximately 15 kilometres (9.3 mi) to its south is Hyden Rock whose northern side features the Wave Rock formation. Also in the area are Scrivener Rocks and Camel Peaks roughly 13 kilometres (8.1 mi) west of The Humps, Anderson Rocks about 19 kilometres (12 mi) north, and King Rocks approximately 18 kilometres (11 mi) east of The Humps.

== Mulka's Cave ==
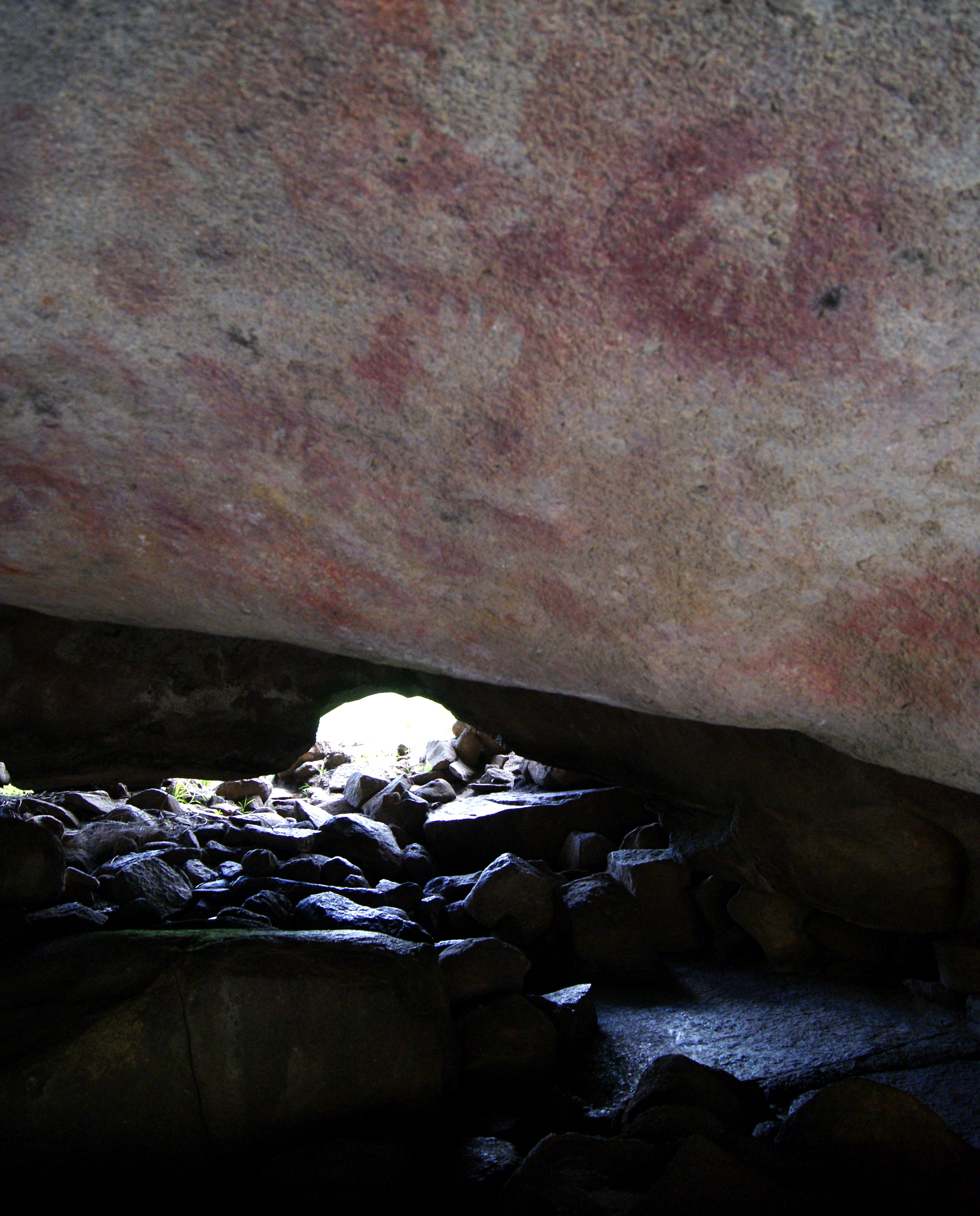
Rock art in Mulka's Cave

On the north-eastern edge of The Humps is Mulka's Cave, also known as Bate's Cave. The cave contains Aboriginal rock art comprising over 450 hand prints and images. Most sites of Aboriginal art in the region contain fewer than 30 motifs. While visitation has damaged the site, mitigation strategies put into place appear to have arrested further damage. Mulka's Cave is protected under the Aboriginal Heritage Act. It is also both a Protected Area and listed on the Register of the National Estate.

== Walks ==
The Humps Nature Reserve has two marked walking trails. Gnamma Trail is approximately 1,220 metres (4,000 ft) long over flat terrain. In contrast, Kalari Trail is approximately 1,670 metres (5,480 ft) long and ascends to the summit, and permits focus on the geology and vegetation along the way.

== Reservoir ==
Water run-off from The Humps is directed into the Hyden Humps Dam reservoir. The reservoir is situated approximately 200 metres (660 ft) south of The Humps.

== See also ==
- Granite outcrops of Western Australia
- List of protected areas of Western Australia
