= List of Australian place names of Aboriginal origin =

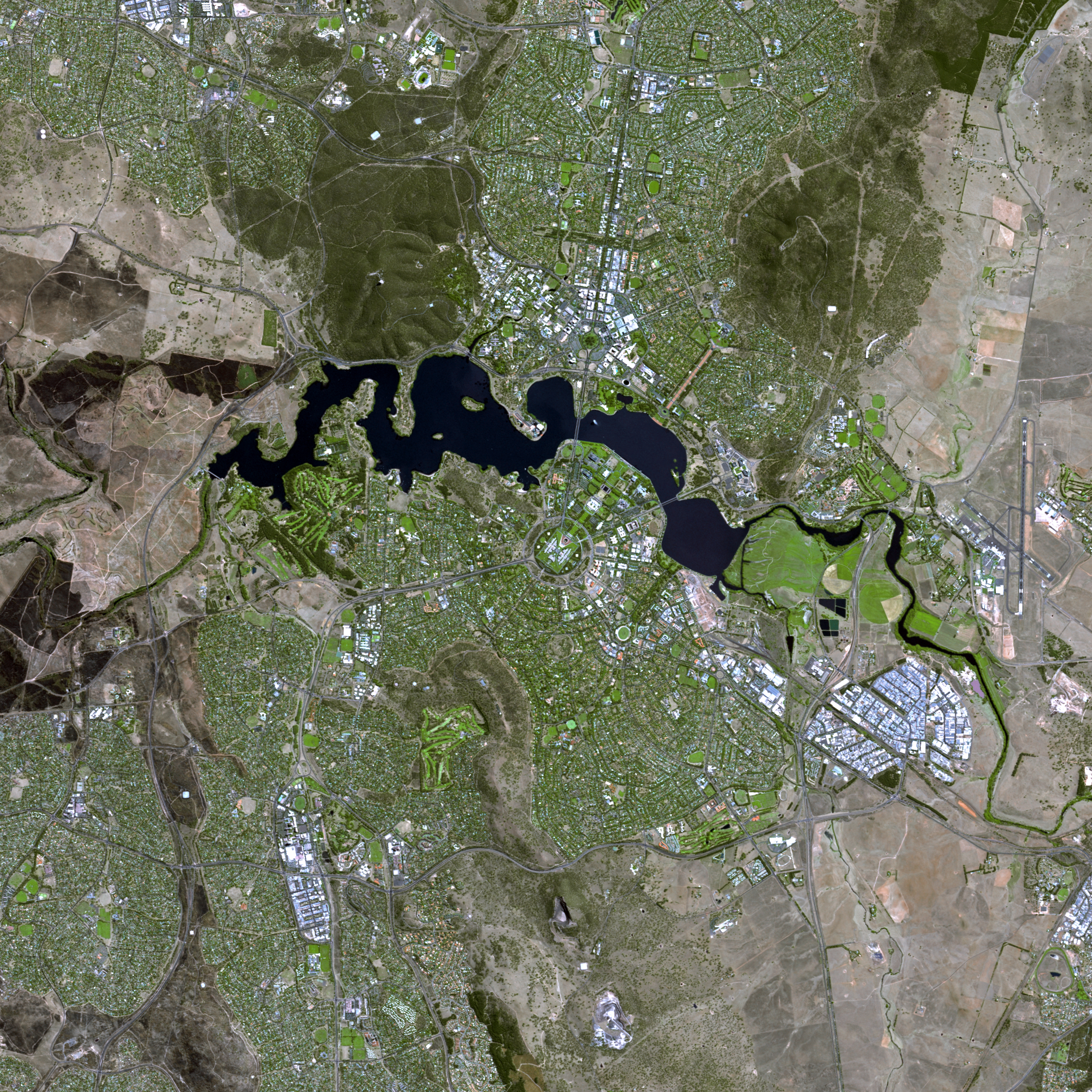
Satellite view of Australia's capital city, Canberra, whose name comes from a Ngunawal language word meaning "meeting place".

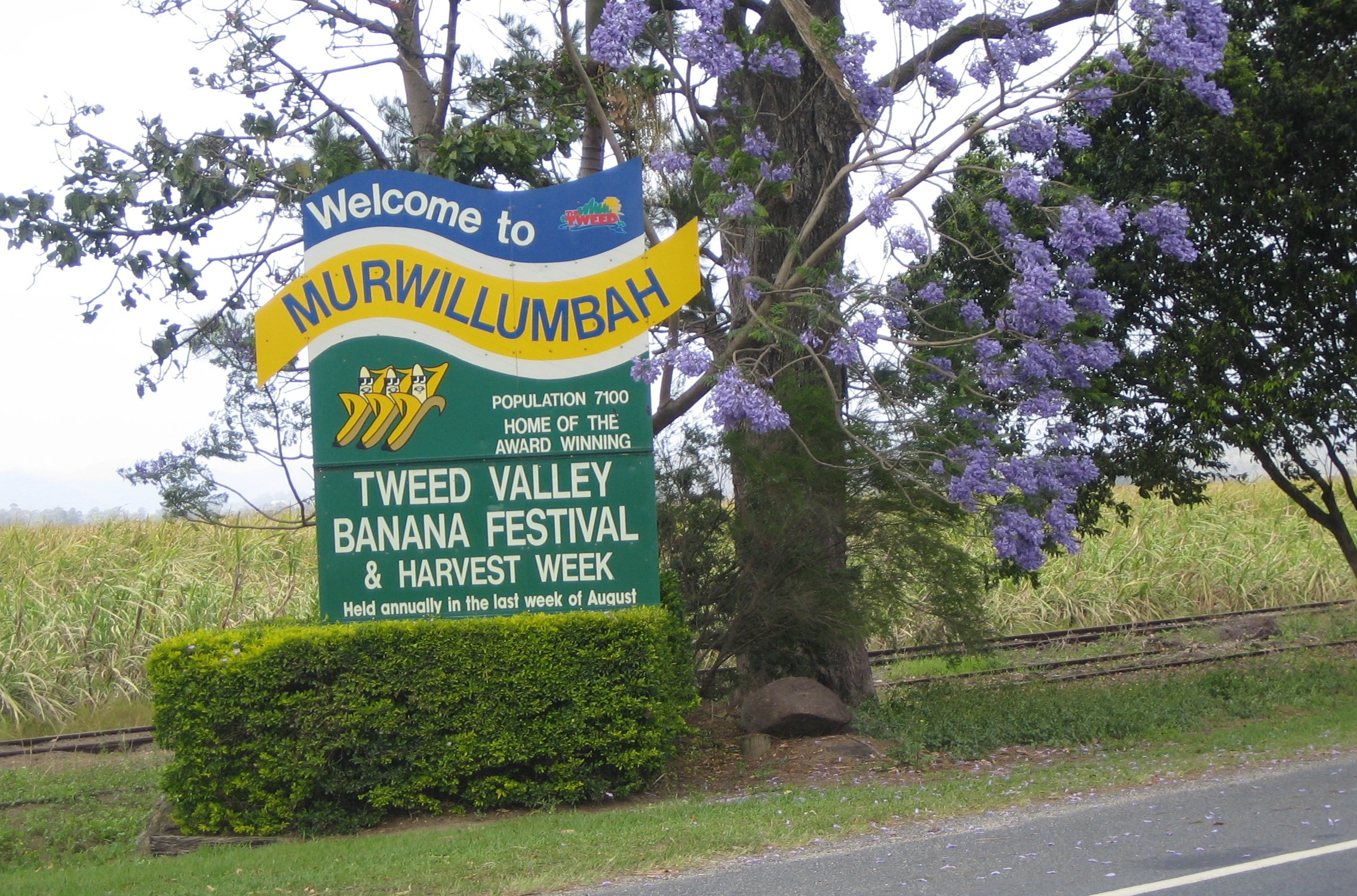
Welcome sign from Murwillumbah, New South Wales. The name derives from the Bandjalang word meaning "camping place".

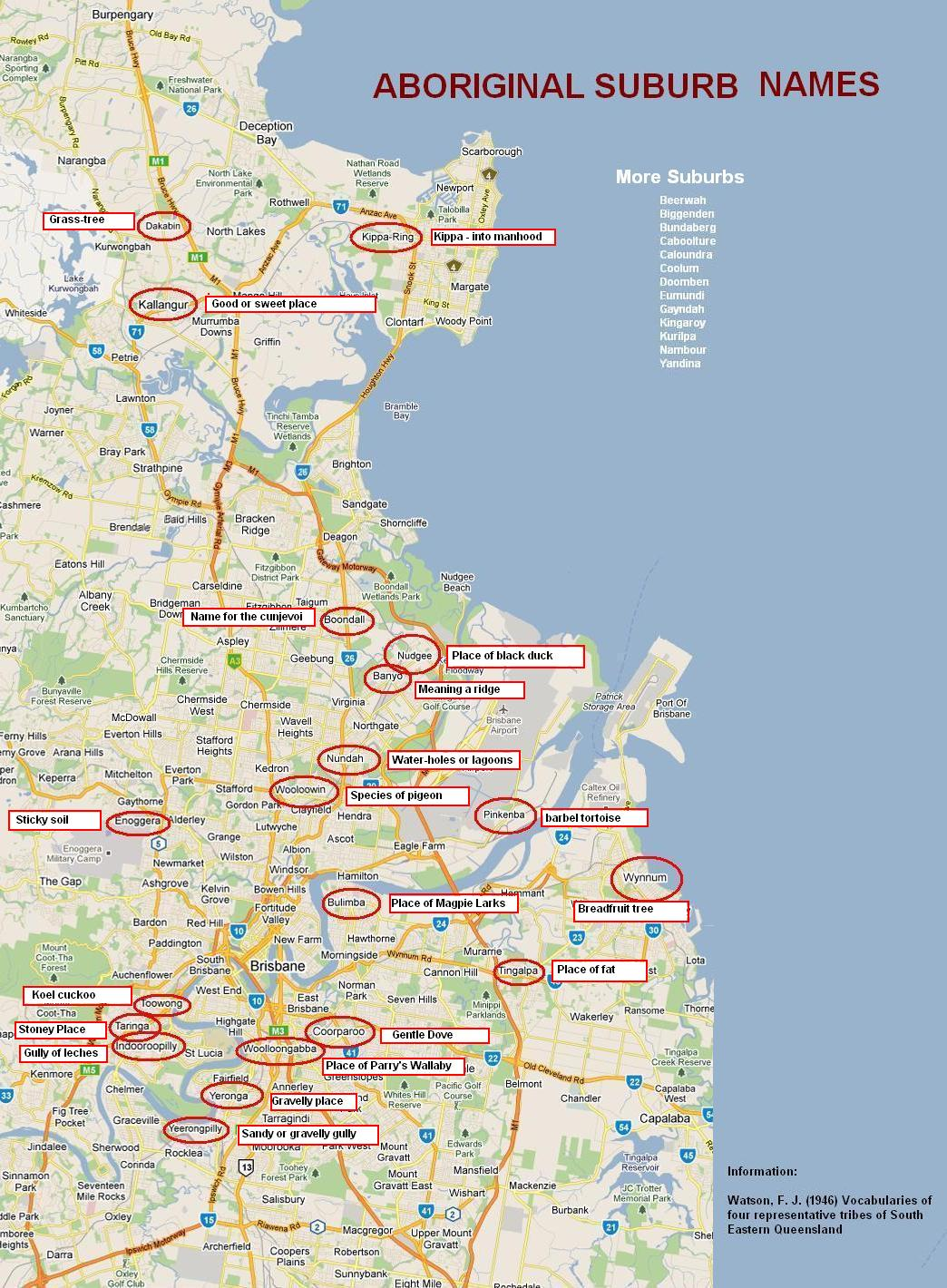
Aboriginal names of suburbs of Brisbane, derived from the Turrbal language.

Place names in Australia have names originating in the Australian Aboriginal languages for three main reasons:

- Historically, European explorers and surveyors may have asked local Aboriginal people the name of a place, and named it accordingly. Where they did not ask, they may have heard the place was so-named. Due to language difficulties, the results were often misheard and misunderstood names, such as the name of the Yarra River. There are a suspicious number of place names which translate as pretty and resting place, which may imply European romanticism, and no doubt a good deal of mispronunciation and corruption in general.
- Australian governments have officially named many places, particularly suburbs, after Aboriginal people or language groups, such as Aranda or Tullamarine.
- The place name has always been called thus by Aboriginal people, and Aboriginal people still live in the area. This is particularly so for Aboriginal communities, such as Maningrida in the Northern Territory. This is more frequent where non-indigenous settlement has been less dense, particularly in Central Australia and the Top End.

Watkin Tench, who arrived on the First Fleet in 1788, observed of the Aboriginal languages of the present-day Sydney area:

"We were at first inclined to stigmatise this language as harsh and barbarous in its sounds. Their combinations of words in the manner they utter them, frequently convey such an effect. But if not only their proper names of men and places, but many of their phrases and a majority of their words, be simply and unconnectedly considered, they will be found to abound with vowels and to produce sounds sometimes mellifluous and sometimes sonorous. What ear can object to the names of Colbee (pronounced exactly as Colby is with us), Bereewan, Bondel, Imeerawanyee, Deedora, Wolarawaree, or Baneelon, among the men; or to Wereeweea, Gooreedeeana, Milba, or Matilba, among the women? Parramatta, Gweea, Cameera, Cadi, and Memel, are names of places. The tribes derive their appellations from the places they inhabit. Thus Cemeeragal, means the men who reside in the bay of Cameera; Cadigal, those who reside in the bay of Cadi; and so of the others."

== Towns and suburbs ==
→A←

- Adaminaby
- Adelong
- Ajana
- Adelong
- Akuna Bay
- Aldinga
- Allambie
- Allambie Heights
- Allanooka
- Allawah
- Allora
- Amaroo
- Amelup
- Anembo
- Angledool
- Angourie
- Angurugu
- Anula
- Arakoon
- Araluen
- Arana Hills
- Aranda
- Aratula
- Ardmona
- Areyonga
- Argalong
- Arrawarra
- Arrino
- Attunga
- Aurukun
- Awaba

→B←

- Baandee
- Babakin
- Badgebup
- Badgingarra
- Badjaling
- Bailup
- Baladjie
- Balagundi
- Balarang
- Balbarrup
- Balcatta
- Balga
- Balgarri
- Balingup
- Ballarat
- Balkuling
- Ballaballa
- Bamaga
- Banya
- Banyo
- Barangaroo
- Bardoc
- Bargo
- Baringa
- Barra Brui (East Gordon)
- Barraba
- Barragup
- Baryulgil
- Beerburrum
- Beechina
- Beeliar
- Beerwah
- Bega
- Bellambi
- Bellara
- Bellata
- Bejoording
- Belka
- Belmunging
- Bemboka
- Benalla
- Bencubbin
- Bendering
- Benjaberring
- Berala
- Berrara
- Beria
- Bermagui
- Berowra
- Berri
- Bewong Creek
- Bilbarin
- Billimari
- Biloela
- Binalong
- Bindi Bindi
- Bindoon
- Binnaway
- Binningup
- Binna Burra
- Binnu
- Birralee
- Birrong
- Birtinya
- Bli Bli
- Bodalla
- Bodallin
- Buddina
- Bogan Gate
- Boggabilla
- Boggabri
- Bolaro
- Bolgart
- Bolong
- Bomaderry
- Bombala
- Bombo
- Bondi
- Bong Bong
- Bongaree
- Boodarockin
- Boogardie
- Boolading
- Boolaroo
- Booligal
- Boonoo Boonoo
- Boorabbin
- Booragoon
- Boorara
- Boorowa
- Boreen Point
- Bowelling
- Bowgada
- Bowral
- Boya
- Boyanup
- Boyup Brook
- Bredbo
- Brit Brit
- Broulee
- Brundee
- Buderim
- Budgewoi
- Bulimba
- Bullaring
- Bulli
- Buln Buln
- Bullaburra
- Bulong
- Bung Bong
- Bundamba
- Bundanoon
- Bundeena
- Bungulla
- Bunjil
- Bunyip
- Burakin
- Buraja
- Burekup
- Burpengary
- Buronga
- Burracoppin
- Burran Rock
- Burraneer
- Buttaba

→C←

- Caboolture
- Cabramatta
- Cabramurra
- Calga
- Calingiri
- Caiguna
- Callala
- Caloundra
- Cammeray
- Canbelego
- Canberra
- Candelo
- Canna
- Carbunup River
- Cardup
- Caringbah
- Carnamah
- Caron
- Carrabin
- Carramar
- Chinocup
- Chittering
- Clackline
- Clybucca
- Cobargo
- Cocklebiddy
- Collarenebri
- Collaroy
- Conargo
- Condingup
- Congelin
- Coodanup
- Coogee
- Coogee
- Cookernup
- Coolac
- Coolah
- Coolamon
- Coolangatta
- Coolbellup
- Coolbinia
- Coolgardie
- Coolimba
- Cooloongup
- Coolup
- Cooma
- Coomalbidgup
- Coonabarabran
- Coonamble
- Coonawarra
- Cooran
- Cooranbong
- Coorow
- Cooroy
- Cootamundra (but Cootamundry Creek)
- Coraki
- Coramba
- Cordering
- Corowa
- Corrigin
- Corrimal
- Corryong
- Couridjah
- Corindi
- Cowandilla
- Cowaramup
- Cowcowing
- Cowra
- Cringila
- Cronulla
- Cuballing
- Cuddingwarra
- Cudgewa
- Cudmirrah
- Culburra
- Cullacabardee
- Cunderdin
- Cunjerong Point
- Curl Curl
- Currambine
- Currarong
- Currumbin
- Currumundi

→D←

- Dalaroo
- Dalwallinu
- Dalyup
- Dandaragan
- Dandenong
- Dangin
- Dardanup
- Darkan
- Dapto
- Dattening
- Deniliquin
- Derrimut
- Dharruk
- Diddillibah
- Dinninup
- Dimbulah
- Dirranbandi
- Doonan
- Drik Drik
- Drouin
- Dongara
- Doodlakine
- Dooralong
- Dowerin
- Dubbo
- Dudinin
- Dukin
- Dumbleyung
- Dungog
- Duranillin
- Duri
- Dwarda
- Dwellingup

→E←

- Echuca
- Echunga
- Ejanding
- Elanora
- Eleebana
- Eneabba
- Eradu
- Erina
- Ettalong
- Ettamogah
- Eucla
- Eugowra
- Eujinyn
- Eulaminna
- Eumundi
- Eungai
- Euroa
- Eurobodalla
- Eurunderee

→G←

- Gabanintha
- Gabbin
- Gagalba
- Galong
- Ganmain
- Garah
- Geelong
- Gerogery
- Gerringong
- Gidgegannup
- Gilgandra
- Gindalbie
- Gingin
- Ginninderra
- Giralang
- Girraween
- Girrawheen
- Gnangara
- Gnowangerup
- Goodna
- Goodooga
- Gooloogong
- Goomalling
- Goondi
- Goondiwindi
- Goonellabah
- Goonengerry
- Goongarrie
- Goonoo Goonoo
- Goornong
- Gringegalgona
- Grong Grong
- Gulargambone
- Gunbalanya
- Gudarra
- Gulgong
- Gullewa
- Gundagai
- Gundamaian
- Gundaroo
- Gungahlin
- Gunnedah
- Gunyidi
- Guyra
- Gwambygine
- Gwelup
- Gymea

→H←

- Howatharra
- Howlong

→I←

- Illabo
- Illaroo
- Illalong
- Illawong
- Iluka
- Inala
- Indooroopilly
- Ingebyra
- Innaloo
- Imbil

→J←

- Jamberoo
- Jandabup
- Jannali
- Jardee
- Jeebropilly
- Jennacubbine
- Jeparit
- Jerangle
- Jerdacuttup
- Jerrabomberra
- Jerramungup
- Jimboomba
- Jincumbilly
- Jindabyne
- Jindalee, Queensland
- Jindalee
- Jingalup
- Jindabyne
- Jindera
- Jingellic
- Jitarning
- Joondalup
- Jugiong

→K←

- Kalamunda
- Kalannie
- Kalbarri
- Kaleen
- Kalgan
- Kalgoorlie
- Kallangur
- Kallaroo
- Kalli
- Kambah
- Kambalda
- Kameruka
- Kanahooka
- Kangy Angy
- Kanowna
- Kanwal
- Karawara
- Karrabin
- Karingal
- Karangi
- Kardinya
- Kareela
- Kariong
- Karlgarin
- Karnup
- Karragullen
- Karrakatta
- Karrakup
- Karratha
- Karridale
- Karrinyup
- Karuah
- Karumba
- Katanning
- Katoomba
- Kauring
- Kebaringup
- Kellerberrin
- Kemblawarra
- Kendenup
- Keperra
- Kerang
- Khancoban
- Kiah
- Kiama
- Kiara
- Kiewa
- Kiley
- Killara
- Kirrawee
- Kirribilli
- Kirup
- Kogarah
- Kojonup
- Kokardine
- Konnongorring
- Koo Wee Rup
- Koojan
- Koolan
- Koolanooka
- Koolewong
- Koolyanobbing
- Koonawarra
- Koondoola
- Koongamia
- Koorda
- Kooragang
- Koreelah
- Korrelocking
- Kooringal
- Korumburra
- Kotara
- Kowanyama
- Krambach
- Kudardup
- Kukerin
- Kulikup
- Kulin
- Kulja
- Kulyalling
- Kumari
- Kundana
- Kunjin
- Kununoppin
- Kununurra
- Kuranda
- Kurnalpi
- Kurnell
- Kurrawang
- Kweda
- Kwelkan
- Kwinana
- Kwolyin
- Kyancutta
- Kyogle
- Kurri Kurri
- Kyabram
- Kyeemagh
- Kywong

→L←

- Lake Cooroibah
- Lameroo
- Lang Lang
- Larrakeyah
- Legana
- Lenah Valley
- Leongatha
- Leumeah
- Leura
- Liawenee
- Lilli Pilli
- Loorana
- Lurnea
- Lutana

→M←

- Magati Ke
- Malanda
- Maleny
- Mallina
- Malua Bay
- Manangatang
- Mandiga
- Mandogalup
- Manera Heights
- Mandurah
- Mandurama
- Mandurang
- Maningrida
- Manildra
- Manilla
- Manjimup
- Manmanning
- Maralinga
- Marangaroo
- Marayong
- Marbelup
- Marchagee
- Mardella
- Mareeba
- Marmong Point
- Maroochydore
- Maroota
- Maroubra
- Mareeba
- Marree
- Maribyrnong
- Mariginiup
- Mathoura
- Matong
- Maya
- Mayanup
- Maydena
- Meckering
- Meekatharra
- Meenaar
- Mendooran
- Menindee
- Merimbula
- Merredin
- Merriwa
- Merrygoen
- Mia Mia
- Michelago
- Miling
- Millaa Millaa
- Millmerran
- Milparinka
- Milperra
- Mindarie
- Minnamurra
- Mingenew
- Minyip
- Mirrabooka
- Mittagong
- Moama
- Moe
- Mogo
- Monbulk
- Mollymook
- Moodiarrup
- Moojebing
- Mooloolaba
- Moonah
- Moonbi
- Mooloolaba
- Mooney Mooney
- Moonijin
- Moora
- Moorabbin
- Moorine Rock
- Moornaming
- Moorooka
- Mooroolbark
- Mooroopna
- Moorumbine
- Morawa
- Mordialloc
- Moree
- Moruya
- Moulyining
- Mount Colah
- Mount Ku-ring-gai
- Mount Warrigal
- Muchea
- Mudgee
- Mudjimba
- Muja
- Mukinbudin
- Mulgarrie
- Mulgoa
- Mullaloo
- Mullalyup
- Mullengandra (formerly Mullanjandra)
- Mullewa
- Mulline
- Mullumbimby
- Mulwarrie
- Mundaring
- Mundijong
- Mundubbera
- Mungindi
- Mungalup
- Munglinup
- Muntadgin
- Murarrie
- Muradup
- Murdunna
- Murrin Murrin
- Murrumba Downs
- Murrumbeena
- Murrumburrah
- Murrurundi
- Murwillumbah
- Myalup
- Myaree

→N←

- Nabawa
- Nabiac
- Nalkain
- Nalya
- Nambrok
- Nambucca
- Nana Glen
- Nangeenan
- Nannine
- Nannup
- Naracoopa
- Naraling
- Narara
- Nareena Hills
- Narembeen
- Naremburn
- Narkal
- Narooma
- Narwee
- Narrabeen
- Narrabri
- Narrabundah
- Narrandera
- Nar Nar Goon
- Narngulu
- Narrabundah
- Narrandera
- Narrawallee
- Narre Warren
- Narraweena
- Narrikup
- Narrogin
- Narromine
- Needilup
- Neendaling
- Neerabup
- Nelligen
- Nemingha
- Nerriga
- Nerrigundah
- Ngunnawal
- Nhulunbuy
- Nimmitabel
- Ningi
- Nippering
- Nirimba
- Noarlunga
- Noggerup
- Nollamara
- Noojee
- Noongal
- Noongar
- Noosa
- North Dandalup
- North Yunderup
- Nowergup
- Nowra
- Nugadong
- Nullagine
- Numbah
- Nungarin
- Nungatta
- Nunngarra
- Nuriootpa
- Nyabing
- Nyngan

→O←

- Omeo
- Ongerup
- Ourimbah
- Ouyen

→P←

- Pambula
- Papunya
- Panania
- Pannawonica
- Parraburdoo
- Paringa
- Parramatta
- Patchewollock
- Patonga
- Pawleena
- Pegarah
- Pemulwuy
- Penna
- Perenjori
- Peringillup
- Pialligo
- Piawaning
- Pindar
- Pingaring
- Pingelly
- Pingrup
- Pinjar
- Pinjarra
- Pintharuka
- Pinwernying
- Pithara
- Poatina
- Pooncarie
- Pootenup
- Popanyinning
- Pormpuraaw
- Porongurup
- Primbee
- Pyree

→Q←

- Quaama
- Quairading
- Qualeup
- Quambone
- Queanbeyan
- Quandialla
- Quigup
- Quindalup
- Quindanning
- Quirindi

→R←

- Ramingining
- Reekara

→S←

- South Kumminin
- South Yunderup

→T←

- Tahmoor
- Talbingo
- Tallangatta
- Tallawarra
- Tallebudgera
- Tambellup
- Tammin
- Tangambalanga
- Tanilba Bay
- Tanunda
- Tarago
- Taralga
- Taranna
- Tarcutta
- Taree
- Taringa
- Taroo
- Taroona
- Tarragindi
- Tarraleah
- Tarrawanna
- Tarzali
- Tathra
- Telarah
- Tenindewa
- Teralba
- Terara
- Terrigal
- Tewantin
- Tharwa
- Thirroul
- Thredbo
- Thurgoona
- Tibooburra
- Tilpa
- Timbillica
- Tincurrin
- Tingalpa
- Tingha
- Tintaldra
- Tolga
- Tomerong
- Tongarra
- Toodyay
- Toogoolawah
- Toukley
- Toolibin
- Tooloom
- Toombul
- Toongabbie
- Toowong
- Toowoomba
- Toolijooa
- Toowong
- Toukley
- Towradgi
- Towrang
- Trangie
- Trayning
- Tuckanarra
- Tuggerah
- Tuggeranong
- Tuggerawong
- Tullimbar
- Tumbarumba
- Tumbi Umbi
- Tumblong
- Tumut
- Tuncurry
- Tura Beach
- Turlinjah
- Turramurra

→U←

- Uki
- Umina
- Unanderra
- Uraidla
- Uriarra
- Uralla
- Urana
- Urunga

→W←

- Wadalba
- Waddamanna
- Wadderin
- Wagaman
- Wagerup
- Wagga Wagga
- Wagin
- Wahroonga
- Walbundrie
- Walcha
- Walgoolan
- Walla Walla
- Wallabadah
- Wallangarra
- Wallerawang
- Walwa
- Wamberal
- Wanaaring
- Wandandian
- Wandering
- Wandi
- Wamboin
- Wandoan
- Wangaratta
- Wangi Wangi
- Wannamal
- Wannanup
- Wanneroo
- Wantirna
- Waramanga
- Warana
- Waratah
- Warrimoo
- Waroona
- Warrachuppin
- Warragul
- Warralakin
- Warrandyte
- Warrawong
- Warrnambool
- Warumbul
- Watheroo
- Wee Waa
- Welbungin
- Werombi
- Weetangera
- Werribee
- West Toodyay
- Wialki
- Wickepin
- Widgiemooltha
- Wilcannia
- Wilga
- Wilkawatt
- Willagee
- Willunga
- Wiluna
- Windang
- Windellama
- Wingala
- Wingello
- Wodalba
- Wodonga
- Wogarl
- Wokalup
- Wollombi
- Wollomombi
- Wollongong
- Wooloowin
- Wonboyn
- Wongai
- Wongan Hills
- Wonnerup
- Woodanilling
- Woodarra
- Woolgoolga
- Wooli
- Woollahra
- Woolloomooloo
- Woolloongabba
- Woongarra
- Woori Yallock
- Woorim
- Wombarra
- Wongawilli
- Woodenbong
- Woolgoolga
- Woollamia
- Woomargamah
- Woomera
- Woonona
- Wooroloo
- Wonthaggi
- Worrigee
- Woy Woy
- Wubin
- Wujal Wujal
- Wulkuraka
- Wundowie
- Wurtulla
- Wyalkatchem
- Wyee
- Wyening
- Wymah
- Wyong
- Wyongah

→Y←

- Yackandandah
- Yagoona
- Yalata
- Yalgoo
- Yallah
- Yallakool
- Yallambie
- Yalup Brook
- Yalwal
- Yamba
- Yambacoona
- Yanchep
- Yanco
- Yandanooka
- Yanderra
- Yandina
- Yarrahapinni
- Yerrinbool
- Yangebup
- Yanmah
- Yannawah
- Yannergee
- Yantabulla
- Yarding
- Yarloop
- Yaroomba
- Yarrabah
- Yarrabandai
- Yarralumla
- Yarram
- Yarramalong
- Yarraman
- Yarrawarrah
- Yarrawonga
- Yarra Bay
- Yarri
- Yatala
- Yattalonga
- Yatte Yattah
- Yealering
- Yeerongpilly
- Yelbeni
- Yellowdine
- Yennora
- Yeppoon
- Yerecoin
- Yeronga
- Yerrinbool
- Yilliminning
- Yirrkala
- Yokine
- Yolla
- Yoogali
- Yornaning
- Yoting
- Youanmi
- Youndegin
- Yoweragabbie
- Yowie Bay
- Yowrie
- Yuendumu
- Yulara
- Yullundry
- Yuluma
- Yuna
- Yundamindera
- Yungaburra
- Yunndaga

== Regions and shires not named after town, river, etc. ==
- Banyule City Council
- Baryulgil
- Barrenjoey
- Boroondara City Council
- Buloke Shire
- Corangamite Shire
- Demondrille Shire (abolished)
- Eurobodalla Shire
- Gannawarra Shire
- Illawarra
- Ku-ring-gai Municipality
- Moorabool Shire
- Mulwaree Shire (abolished)
- Murrumbidgee
- Murrundindi Shire
- Ngaanyatjarraku
- Nillumbik Shire
- Orana Region
- Pilbara
- Warringah Shire
- Yarriambiack Shire

== Natural features ==
=== Beaches (not named after town or suburb) ===
- Belongil
- Bouddi
- Bulgo Beach
- Bungan
- Elouera
- Era Beach (North and South)
- Garie Beach
- Tamarama Beach
- Wanda
- Wattamolla
- Werri Beach
- Werrong Beach

=== Bays ===
- Akuna
- Careel
- Curracurrang Cove
- Curracurrong Cove
- Erowal Bay
- Gunamatta
- Malua
- Myuna Bay
- Tanilba Bay
- Toowoon
- Waratah
- Yowie

=== Lakes ===
- Budgewoi
- Bungunnia
- Burrendong
- Burrill Lake
- Cargelligo
- Lake Canobolas
- Catagunyah
- Lake Conjola
- Coomaditchy Lagoon
- Coongie
- Etamunbanie
- Minigwal
- Lake Mokoan (now demolished)
- Moondah
- Lake Mulwala
- Lake Munmorah
- Noondie
- Parangana
- Lake Tabourie
- Tuggerah
- Uloowaranie
- Yamma Yamma
- Yantabangee
- Yarra Yarra

=== Rivers ===
- Barcoo
- Barwon
- Bega
- Belubula River
- Belyando
- Bemboka River
- Bogan
- Bokhara River
- Bombala
- Boorowa River
- Brogo River
- Bulloo
- Bungala
- Capertee River
- Colo
- Coolaburragundy
- Crackenback River
- Cudgegong
- Culgoa
- Eucumbene River
- Goobarragandra River
- Goolwa
- Gudgenby River
- Kalang River
- Kalgan
- Kedumba River
- Kolan
- Kowmung River
- Maranoa River
- Maribyrnong
- Maroochy
- Mehi
- Minnamurra
- Mitta Mitta
- Molonglo
- Mooki
- Moonie
- Muleurundi (supplanted by use of name MacDonald River, Bendemeer)
- Munyang River
- Murrumbidgee
- Myponga
- Nambucca
- Namoi
- Narram
- Nattai River
- Nerang River
- Nogoa
- Noosa River
- Nowendoc River
- Nymboida
- Onkaparinga
- Orara
- Pallinup
- Paroo
- Parramatta
- Queanbeyan
- Ringarooma
- Talbragar
- Tamar
- Tambo
- Tooma River
- Tumut River
- Wallagaraugh River
- Warragamba River
- Warrego
- Willochra
- Wingecarribee River
- Wolgan River
- Wollondilly River
- Woronora
- Yankalilla
- Yappar
- Yarra
- Yass (corruption of Ngunnawal word Yarh)

=== Creeks ===
- Cabramatta
- Cockabutta
- Currumbene Creek
- Eungai
- Kinchela Creek
- Mingera
- Mullum Mullum
- Tantawangalo Creek
- Wallarah Creek
- Wollemi
- Wongo
- Djerriwarrh

=== Islands ===
- Kooragang Island
- K'gari Island

=== Mountains, ranges etc ===
- Mount Baranduda
- Mount Baw Baw
- Beerwah
- Mount Bimberi
- Bindook Tableland
- Mount Bingar
- Bogong High Plains
- Boorowa River (formerly Burrowa)
- Brindabella Range
- Budawang Range
- Mount Buller
- Bungle Bungle Range
- Bunya Mountains
- Burrup Peninsula
- Bywong Hills
- Caloola Pass
- Mount Canobolas
- Chincogan
- Conimbla Range
- Coonoowrin
- Mount Dandenong
- Dandenong Ranges
- Dargo High Plains
- Dederang Gap
- Mount Goonaneman
- Kanangra Walls
- Mount Kaputar
- Kata Tjuta
- Keajura Gap
- Mount Keira
- Mount Kembla
- Kyeamba Gap
- Moonbi Range
- Mount Moonbil
- Mumbulla Mountain
- Munghorn Gap
- Nandewar Range
- Mount Nardi
- Tibrogargan
- Mount Tilga
- Tinderry Range
- Mount Ulandra
- Uluru
- Mount Wandera
- Watagan Mountains
- Warrumbungle Range
- Wilpena Pound
- Wollumbin (Mount Warning)
- Wundu (Thornton's Peak)
- Mount Yarrahapinni
- You Yangs

=== Deserts ===
- Tanami Desert
- Tirari Desert

=== Caves ===
- Bendethera
- Bungonia
- Colong
- Coolamon
- Jenolan
- Tuglow
- Yarrongobilly

Borenore

== Dams ==
- Bendora
- Blowering
- Burrendong
- Burrinjuck
- Corin
- Eucumbene
- Googong
- Jounama Pondage
- Pindari
- Tantangara
- Wyangala

== Parks and forests ==
=== National parks ===
- Arakoon
- Arakwal
- Barool
- Baw Baw
- Bendidee
- Boonoo Boonoo
- Bouddi
- Budawang
- Bundjalung
- Burrowa
- Canunda
- Coopracambra
- Coorong
- Croajingolong
- Currawinya
- Dharug
- Dipperu
- Dunggir
- Eurobodalla
- Garigal
- Japoon
- Kakadu
- Karijini
- Kuringgai
- Marramarra
- Muoganmarra
- Nangar
- Nattai
- Nymboida
- Onkaparinga River
- Porongurup
- Purnululu
- Tamborine
- Tarra-Bulga
- Terrick Terrick
- Uluru-Kata Tjuta
- Witjira
- Wollemi
- Wyrrabalong
- Yarra Ranges
- Yengo

=== Nature reserves ===
- Muogamarra

=== State forests ===
- Bago
- Barmah
- Belanglo
- Bodalla
- Bondo
- Buckenbowra
- Buckingbong
- Bulga
- Bullala
- Bungongo
- Burrawan
- Chaelundi
- Cobaw
- Cobboboonee
- Colymea
- Conjola
- Corrabare
- Croobyar
- Currambine
- Currowan
- Dingo
- Drajurk
- Etoo
- Ewingar
- Gibberagee
- Gilwarny
- Goonoo
- Grahway
- Ingalba
- Jenolan
- Kioloa
- Malara
- Maragle
- Moruya
- Murrah
- Nerong
- Ourimbah
- Pilliga
- Pokolbin
- Riamukka
- Tallaganda
- Tamban
- Tillarook
- Toolangi
- Tuggolo
- Wang Wauk
- Weecurra
- Wingello
- Wombat
- Woomargama
- Wyong
- Yadboro
- Yalwal
- Yarratt

=== State Conservation Areas ===
- Whian Whian

== Highways and main roads ==
- Ballambur Street
- Ballandella Road
- Barrenjoey Road
- Belconnen Way
- Bindubi Street
- Bunnerong Road
- Canberra Avenue
- Coranderrk Street
- Ginninderra Drive
- Gundaroo Drive
- Gungahlin Drive
- Jerrabomberra Avenue
- Kamilaroi Highway
- Majura Parkway
- Maroondah Highway
- Menang Drive
- Milperra Road
- Mirrabei Drive
- Monaro Highway
- Namitjira Drive
- Oodnadatta Track
- Tharwa Drive
- Tuggeranong Parkway
- Warrego Highway
- Wilman Wadandi Highway
- Warrigal Road
- Warringah Road
- Woniora Road
- Yamba Drive

== Non-Aboriginal place names that are assumed to be Aboriginal ==
- Aramac (a corruption of the name Robert Ramsey Mackenzie, Premier of Queensland)
- Bellingen (three towns in Germany carry this name)
- Wangara ((Wan(neroo)) + (Gnan)gara)

== Place names over which uncertainty exists ==
- Bruthen – a Celtic place name used in Britain (now named Breidden), between Shropshire, England and Powys, Wales; also a Scott's Gaelic word meaning striped or checked; and in Cornish the word means freckled or speckled.
- Bodalla – a corruption of "boat alley".
- Narrabeen – a corruption of "narrow bean".
- Traralgon
- Ulladulla – a corruption of "holey dollar".
- Warracknabeal
- Watanobbi – could be from Watanabe, Japanese surname, or a description of the hill to which the word refers.

== See also ==
- Gadigal metro station in Sydney
- List of reduplicated Australian place names
- -up, a Noongar-based suffix, common to many south western Western Australia place names
