= Barwon =

Barwon may refer to:

- Barwon, a horse which won the 1862 Victoria Derby
- Electoral district of Barwon, in the New South Wales Legislative Assembly, Australia
- HM Prison Barwon, a maximum security prison in Lara, Victoria, Australia
- HMAS Barwon (K406), a Royal Australian Navy River class frigate

== See also ==
- Barwon River (disambiguation)
- Barwon Heads, Victoria, coastal township, Australia
