= List of State Register of Heritage Places in the Shire of Quairading =

List of heritage sites in Western Australia

The State Register of Heritage Places is maintained by the Heritage Council of Western Australia. As of 2026, 233 places are heritage-listed in the Shire of Quairading, of which seven are on the State Register of Heritage Places.

== List ==
The Western Australian State Register of Heritage Places, as of 2026, lists the following seven state registered places within the Shire of Quairading:

Place name	Place #	Street number	Street name	Suburb or town	Co-ordinates	Notes & former names	Photo
Toapin Weir	4898	70	Toapin Road	Quairading	31.979679°S 117.358445°E		
Quairading State School & Quarters (former)	4914	22 & 28	McLennan Street	Quairading	32.007159°S 117.400042°E	Quairading School, Quairading State School (former) Precinct School building destroyed by fire in February 2016	
Teacher's Quarters (former), Quairading	17588		McLennon Street	Quairading	32.007338°S 117.400288°E	School Master's House (former), Quairading	
Quairading State School (former)	17589		McLennon Street	Quairading	32.007157°S 117.400042°E		
St Francis Xavier Church & Presbytery, Quairading	24588	72	Coraling Street	Quairading	32.00601°S 117.398129°E		
St Francis Xavier- Presbytery	24641	Lot 135	Heggarty Street	Quairading	32.006245°S 117.398517°E		
St Francis Xavier Roman Catholic Church	24785	135	Heggarty Street	Quairading	32.006103°S 117.398764°E		
