= Acacia tratmaniana =

Scientific classification
- Kingdom: Plantae
- Clade: Tracheophytes
- Clade: Angiosperms
- Clade: Eudicots
- Clade: Rosids
- Order: Fabales
- Family: Fabaceae
- Subfamily: Caesalpinioideae
- Clade: Mimosoid clade
- Genus: Acacia
- Species: A. tratmaniana

Binomial name
- Acacia tratmaniana W.Fitzg.
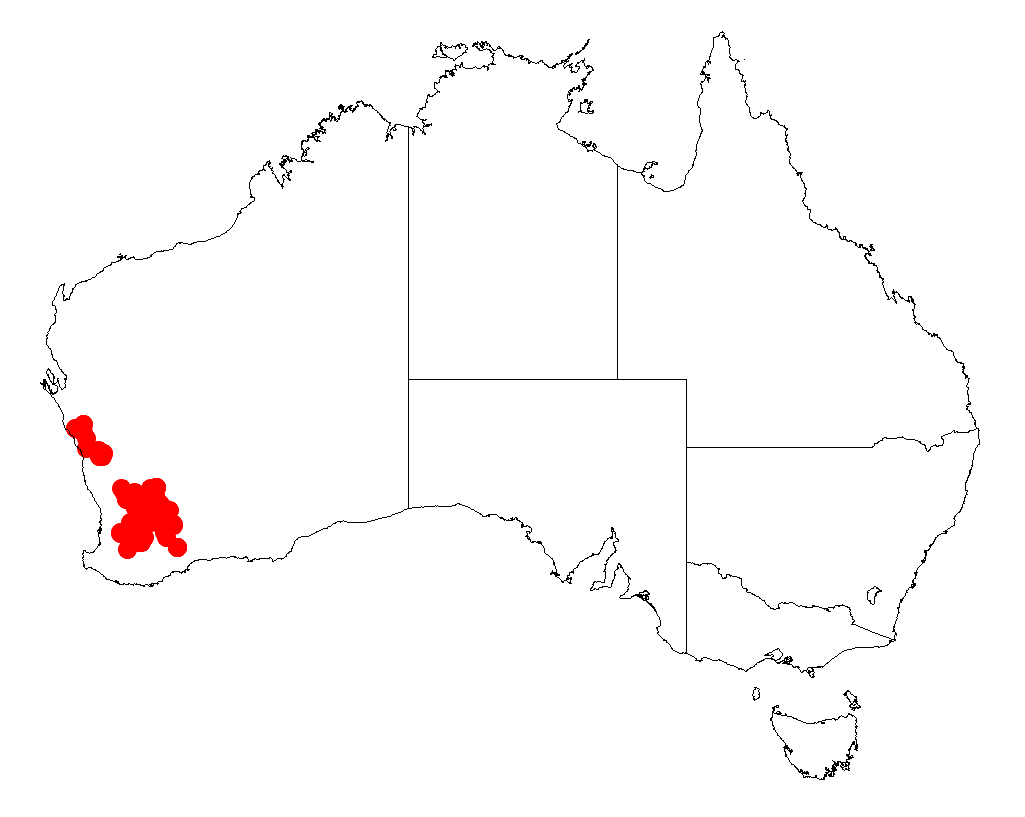
- Occurrence data from AVH

Species of legume

Acacia tratmaniana is a shrub belonging to the genus Acacia and the subgenus Juliflorae that is endemic to south western Australia.

== Description ==
The dense and erect shrub typically grows to a height of 1.5 to 3 metres (5 to 10 ft). The sericeous branchlets have resinous ribs. Like many species of Acacia it has phyllodes rather than true leaves. The ascending or spreading phyllodes are shallowly to moderately incurved and quadrangular in cross section. The slender and glabrous phyllodes have a length of 2.5 to 11 cm (0.98 to 4.33 in) and a width of 0.5 to 0.7 mm (0.020 to 0.028 in) with a broad nerve along each angle. It blooms from July to September producing yellow flowers.

== Distribution ==
It is native to an area in the Wheatbelt region of Western Australia where it is often situated on rocky ridges, flats and salt flats where it grows in sandy or sandy loam soils often with lateritic gravel. The bulk of the population is found from around Wongan Hills and Mukinbudin in the north down to around Pingelly and Hyden in the south with disjunct populations around Geraldton.

== See also ==
- List of Acacia species
