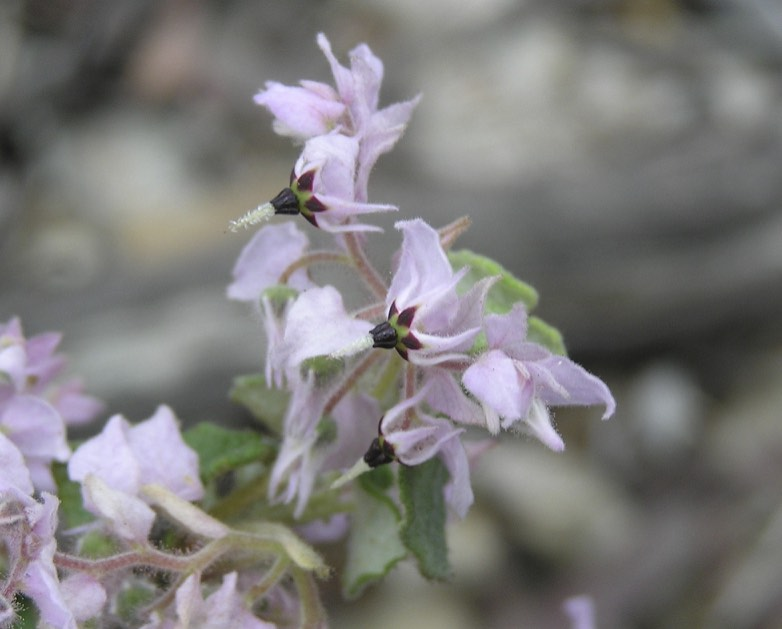

Conservation status
- Declared rare (DEC)

Scientific classification
- Kingdom: Plantae
- Clade: Tracheophytes
- Clade: Angiosperms
- Clade: Eudicots
- Clade: Rosids
- Order: Malvales
- Family: Malvaceae
- Genus: Lasiopetalum
- Species: L. rotundifolium

Binomial name
- Lasiopetalum rotundifolium Paust

= Lasiopetalum rotundifolium =

Species of shrub

Lasiopetalum rotundifolium is a species of flowering plant in the family Malvaceae and is endemic to the south-west of Western Australia. It is an erect to spreading shrub with hairy young stems, round leaves with a heart-shaped base, and pink and dark red flowers.

== Description ==
Lasiopetalum rotundifolium is an erect to spreading shrub, typically 0.5–1.5 m (1 ft 8 in – 4 ft 11 in) high and 0.6–0.8 mm (0.024–0.031 in) wide, its young stems covered with star-shaped hairs. The leaves are more or less round with a heart-shaped base, 6–24 mm (0.24–0.94 in) long and wide on a petiole 2.4–4.5 mm (0.094–0.177 in) long. The lower surface of the leaf is a lighter shade of green and is densely covered with star-shaped hairs. The flowers are borne in clusters of nine to fourteen 26–42 mm (1.0–1.7 in) long on a peduncle 8.5–15 mm (0.33–0.59 in) long, each flower on a pedicel 3–6 mm (0.12–0.24 in) long with egg-shaped to elliptic bracts 3.5–5 mm (0.14–0.20 in) long at the base and bracteoles 3.6–11 mm (0.14–0.43 in) long below the base of the sepals. The sepals lobes are narrowly egg-shaped and 5.1–6.5 mm (0.20–0.26 in) long, pinkish-mauve and green with a dark red patch. There are no petals, and the anthers are 1.7–1.8 mm (0.067–0.071 in) long on filaments 0.4–0.6 mm (0.016–0.024 in) long. Flowering occurs from September to December.

== Taxonomy ==
Lasiopetalum rotundifolium was first formally described in 1974 by Susan Paust in the journal Nuytsia from specimens collected from near New Norcia by Charles Gardner in 1947. The specific epithet (rotundifolium) means "almost circular leaves".

== Distribution and habitat ==
This lasiopetalum grows in shrubby or heathy woodland near Pingelly and Narrogin but is no longer found near the type location.

== Conservation status ==
Lasiopetalum rotundifolium is listed as "threatened" by the Western Australian Government Department of Biodiversity, Conservation and Attractions, meaning that it is in danger of extinction.
