= Kianga =

Kianga may refer to:

- Kianga, New South Wales, Australia
- Kianga, Queensland, a town in the Shire of Banana, Australia

== See also ==
- Kiang, a wild ass native to the Tibetan Plateau
- Kiangai, a settlement in Kenya
- Kiangan, Ifugao, Philippines
