= Pantapin, Western Australia =

Pantapin
- Town
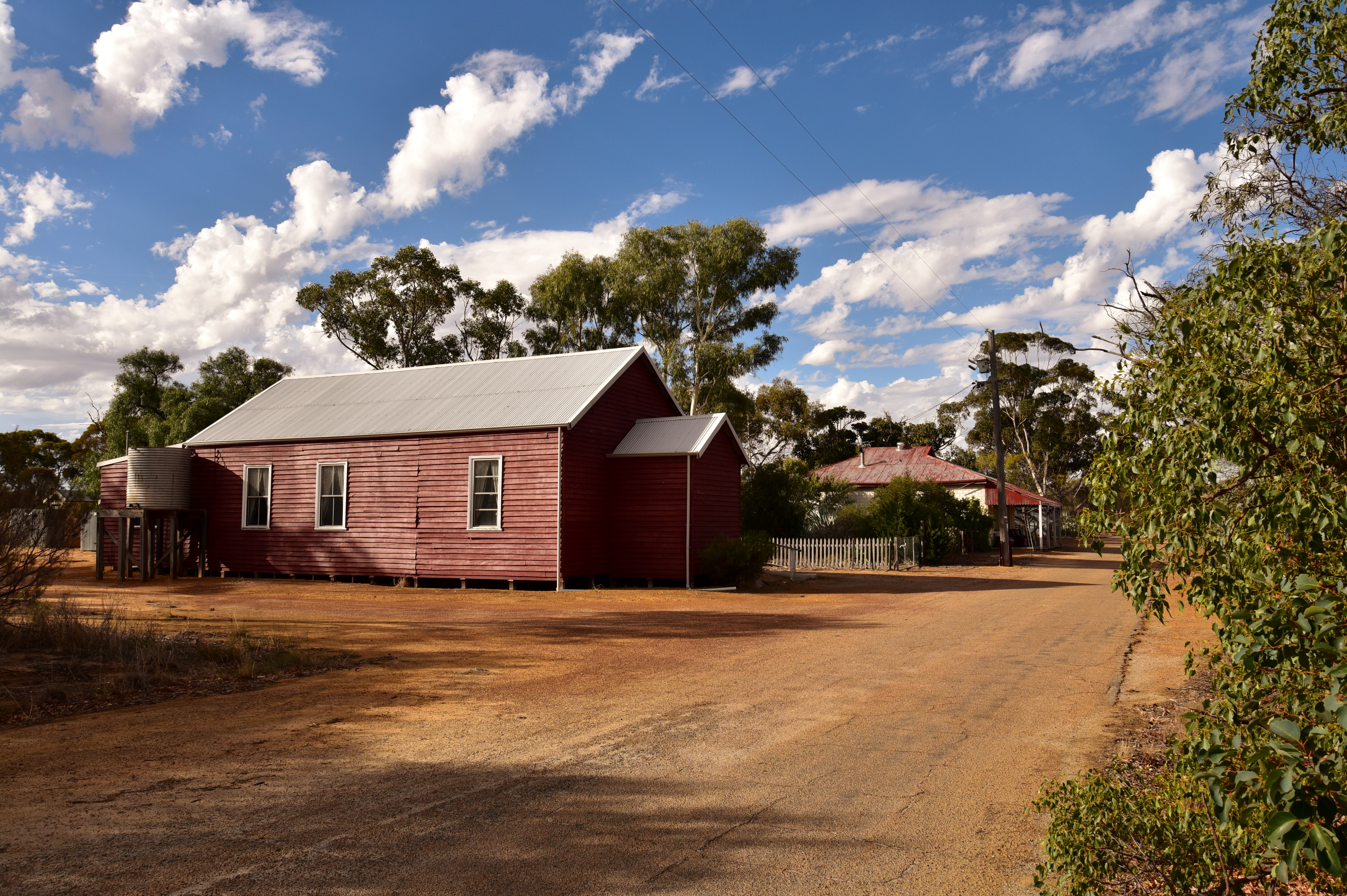
- Railway Street, Pantapin, 2018

- Coordinates: 31°57′00″S 117°39′00″E
- Country: Australia
- State: Western Australia
- LGA(s): Shire of Quairading
- Location: 191 km (119 mi) east of Perth; 26 km (16 mi) east of Quairading; 36 km (22 mi) south of Kellerberrin
- Established: 1913

Government
  - State electorate(s): Central Wheatbelt
  - Federal division(s): O'Connor

Area
  - Total: 219.5 km^{2} (84.7 sq mi)
- Elevation: 344 m (1,129 ft)

Population
  - Total(s): 25 (SAL 2021)
- Postcode: 6384

Pantapin is a small town in the Wheatbelt region of Western Australia.

The town originated as a railway siding that was planned in 1912 as part of the Quairading to Bruce Rock line. The town was initially named Ulakain, after a nearby well, and was gazetted under that name in 1914.

The name proved problematic – causing mail and goods to go missing, according to the residents – and was changed in 1921.
