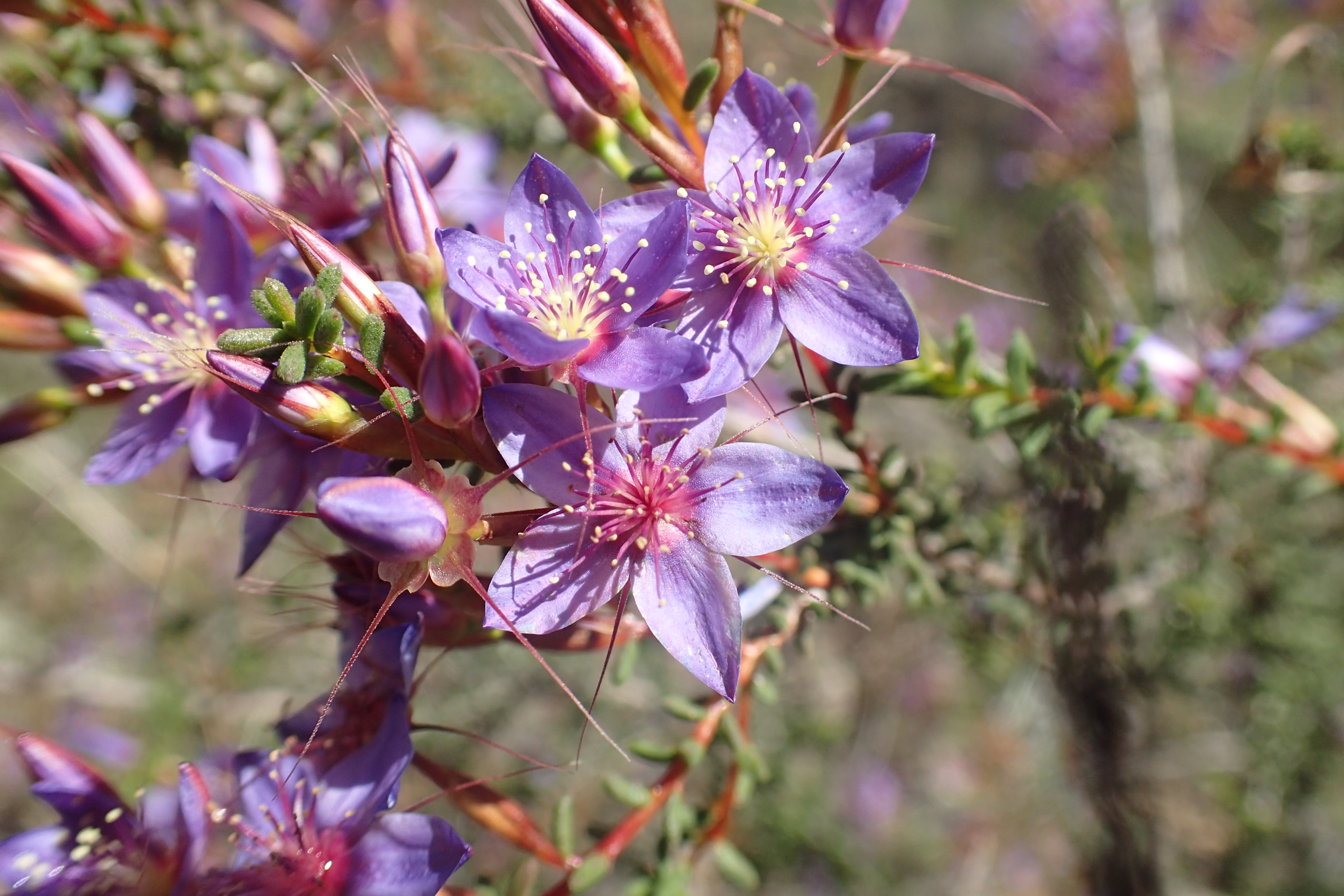

Scientific classification
- Kingdom: Plantae
- Clade: Tracheophytes
- Clade: Angiosperms
- Clade: Eudicots
- Clade: Rosids
- Order: Myrtales
- Family: Myrtaceae
- Genus: Calytrix
- Species: C. violacea

Binomial name
- Calytrix violacea (Lindl.) Craven

Synonyms
- Lhotskya violacea Lindl.; Lhotskya violacea Lindl. var. violacea

= Calytrix violacea =

Species of flowering plant

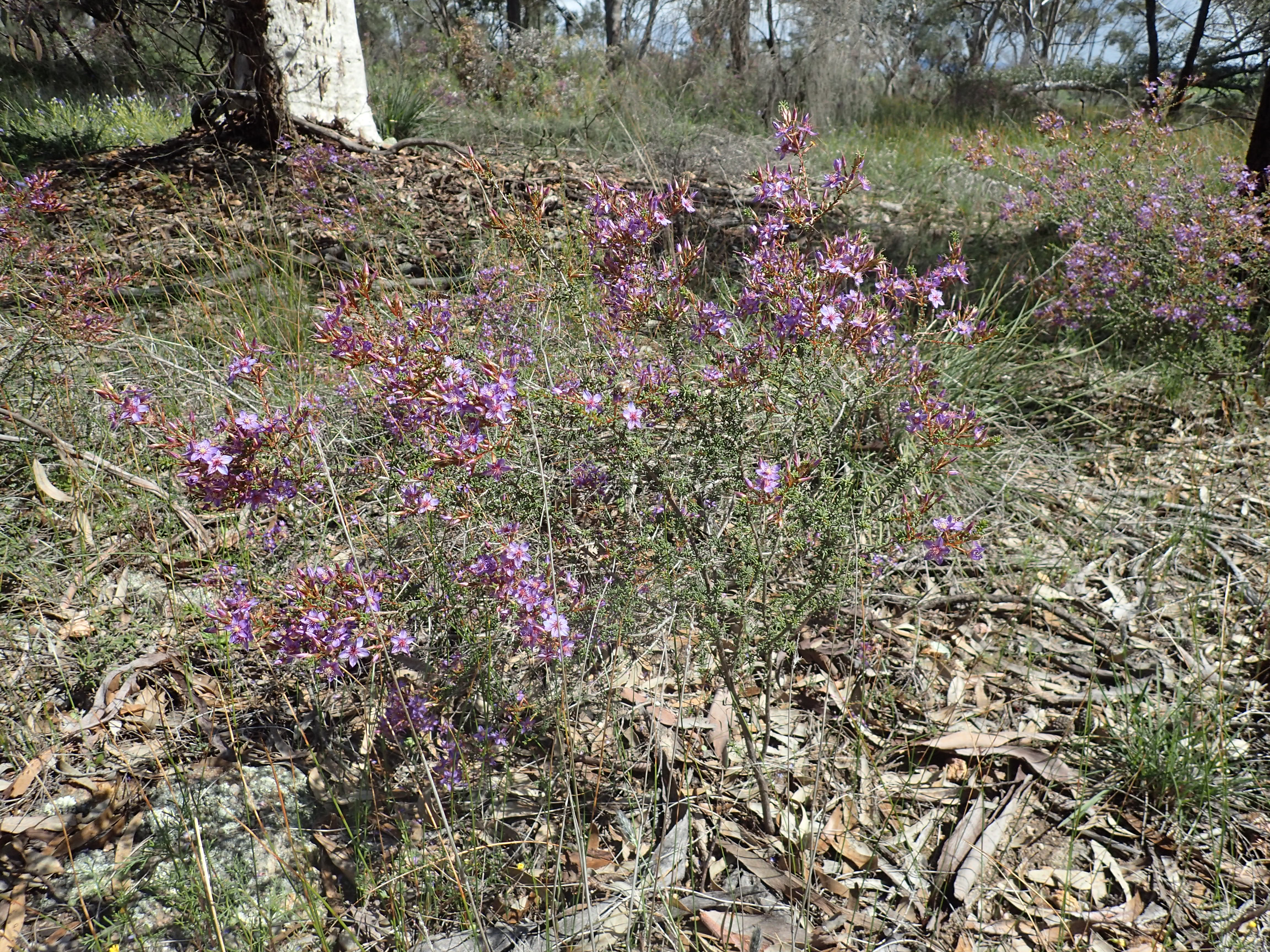
Habit in the Wallaby Hills Nature Reserve, near York

Calytrix violacea is a species of flowering plant in the myrtle family, Myrtaceae and is endemic to the southwest of Western Australia. It is a shrub with linear to narrowly egg-shaped leaves with the narrower end towards the base, and purple, star-shaped flowers.

== Description ==
Calytrix violacea is and erect to sprawling shrub that typically grows to a height of 15–45 cm (5.9–17.7 in), its young stems softly hairy. The leaves are linear to narrowly egg-shaped with the narrower end towards the base, mostly 4–5 mm (0.16–0.20 in) long and 0.8–1.2 mm (0.031–0.047 in) wide on a petiole 0.4–1 mm (0.016–0.039 in) long with thread-like stipules at the base. The flowers are star-shaped and arranged in clusters of 5 to 25 on the ends of branches that continue to grow after flowering. There are bracts 3–7 mm (0.12–0.28 in) long at the base of the flowers and clusters. The flowers are 12–15 mm (0.47–0.59 in) wide, the sepals broadly egg-shaped, 1.8–2.5 mm (0.071–0.098 in) long, the petals egg-shaped, purple, 5.5–7.0 mm (0.22–0.28 in) long and 2.8–3.5 mm (0.11–0.14 in) wide. There are 55 to 75 stamens and staminodes, the longest with filaments 4.5–5.5 mm (0.18–0.22 in) long and the anthers are yellow. Flowering mainly occurs in September and October.

== Taxonomy ==
This species was first formally described in 1839 by John Lindley, who gave it the name Lhotskya violacea in his book A Sketch of the Vegetation of the Swan River Colony. In 1987, Lyndley Craven changed the name to Calytrix violacea in the journal Brunonia. The specific epithet (violacea) means "violet".

== Distribution and habitat ==
Calytrix violacea grows in shrubland and woodland in sandy soil on plains and hills in the wheatbelt between Goomalling, Northam, Brookton and Quairading in the Avon Wheatbelt and Jarrah Forest bioregions of south-western Western Australia.

== Conservation status ==
Calytrix violacea is listed as "not threatened" by the Western Australian Government Department of Biodiversity, Conservation and Attractions.
