= Kulyaling, Western Australia =

Kulyaling
- Town
- Interactive map of Kulyaling
- Coordinates: 32°28′S 117°03′E
- Country: Australia
- State: Western Australia
- LGA: Shire of Pingelly
- Location: 148 km (92 mi) ESE of Perth; 10 km (6.2 mi) S of Brookton
- Established: 1907

Government
  - State electorate: Wagin
  - Federal division: O'Connor
- Elevation: 262 m (860 ft)
- Postcode: 6308

Kulyaling, formerly Kulyalling, is a small town just off the Great Southern Highway located between Brookton and Pingelly in the Wheatbelt region of Western Australia.

A railway siding named Westbrook was the origin of the town. The siding was established in 1905 and then the local progress association petitioned for a townsite to be declared. The townsite was gazetted in 1906 as Westbrook but the Lands Department sought to change the name as Westbrook was already in use. Two Aboriginal names were considered; Nimbedilling and Colyalling. The name was changed and the town was gazetted in 1907.

The name of the town comes from the Aboriginal name for a local water source and rock formation but the meaning is unknown.
