= Shire of Pingelly =

Local government area in Wheatbelt region of Western Australia

- Local government area
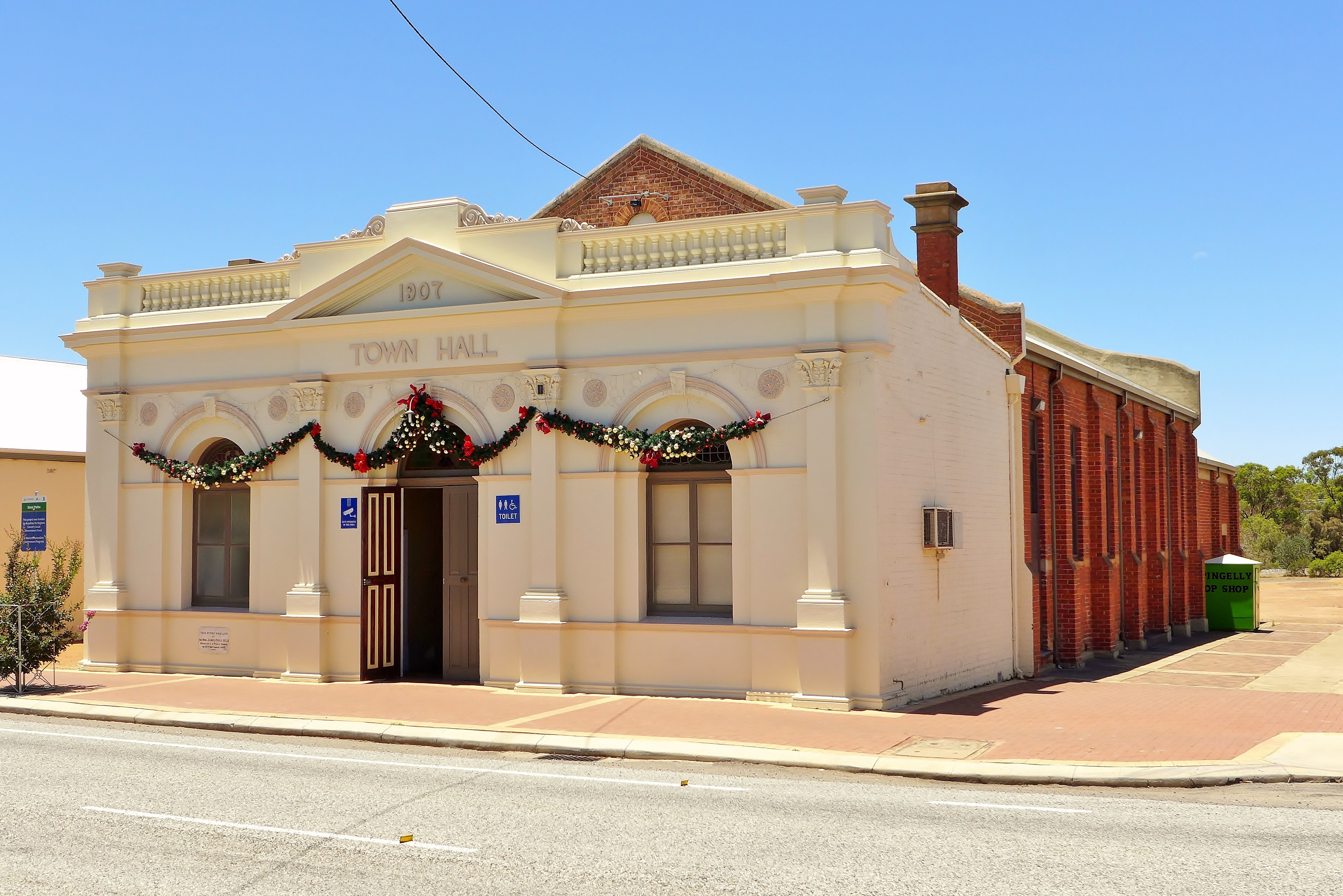
- Pingelly Town Hall, 2014

- Interactive map of Shire of Pingelly
- Country: Australia
- State: Western Australia
- Region: Wheatbelt
- Established: 1891
- Council seat: Pingelly

Government
  - Shire President: William Mulroney
  - State electorate: Central Wheatbelt
  - Federal division: O'Connor

Area
  - Total: 1,294.6 km^{2} (499.8 sq mi)

Population
  - Total: 1,037 (LGA 2021)
- Website: Shire of Pingelly
LGAs around Shire of Pingelly
	Brookton	Corrigin
Wandering	Shire of Pingelly	Corrigin
	Cuballing	Wickepin

The Shire of Pingelly is a local government area in the Wheatbelt region of Western Australia, about 160 kilometres (99 mi) southeast of the state capital, Perth, between the Shires of Brookton and Cuballing along the Great Southern Highway. The Shire covers an area of 1,295 square kilometres (500 sq mi), and its seat of government is the town of Pingelly.

== History ==
On 24 December 1891, the Morambine Road District was created. On 21 February 1913, it was renamed the Pingelly Road District. On 1 July 1961, it became a Shire following the passage of the Local Government Act 1960, which reformed all remaining road districts into shires.

== Wards ==
From 20 October 2007, Pingelly is no longer divided into wards, and its 8 councillors represent the entire shire.

The ward systems created under successive divisions were as follows:

1921	1986	1992	2003
Pingelly Ward (3)	Pingelly Ward (4)	Town Ward (4)	
Central Ward (2)	Mourambine Ward (1)	Hotham Ward (1)	Hotham Ward (2)
Central Ward (2)	Noonebin Ward (1)	Jingaring Ward (1)	Jingaring Ward (2)
North East Ward (1)		Kulyaling Ward (1)	Kulyaling Ward (2)
North West Ward (1)		Tutanning Ward (1)	Tutanning Ward (2)
South East Ward (1)			
South West Ward (1)			

== Towns and localities ==
The towns and localities of the Shire of Pingelly with population and size figures based on the most recent Australian census:

Locality	Population	Area	Map
East Pingelly	211 (SAL 2021)	922.2 km^{2} (356.1 sq mi)	
Pingelly	722 (SAL 2021)	12.5 km^{2} (4.8 sq mi)	
West Pingelly	100 (SAL 2021)	359.4 km^{2} (138.8 sq mi)	

== Former towns ==
- Dattening
- Kulyaling
- Moorumbine

== Population ==
Historical population

Year	Pop.	±% p.a.
1911	1,879	—
1921	1,644	−1.33%
1933	1,496	−0.78%
1947	1,230	−1.39%
1954	1,519	+3.06%
1961	1,639	+1.09%
1966	1,453	−2.38%
1971	1,447	−0.08%
1976	1,446	−0.01%

Year	Pop.	±% p.a.
1981	1,410	−0.50%
1986	1,371	−0.56%
1991	1,171	−3.10%
1996	1,132	−0.68%
2001	1,122	−0.18%
2006	1,168	+0.81%
2011	1,163	−0.09%
2016	1,146	−0.29%
2021	1,037	−1.98%

== Notable councillors ==
- George Sewel, Pingelly Roads Board member 1904–1915, chairman 1914–1915; later a state MP

== Heritage-listed places ==
As of 2023, 71 places are heritage-listed in the Shire of Pingelly, of which one is on the State Register of Heritage Places, the Pingelly Post Office. A second place on the register, the CBH Bins, Pingelly, was deregistered on 1 July 2021.

Place name	Place #	Street name	Suburb or town	Co-ordinates	Built	State registered	Notes & former names	Photo
Pingelly Post Office	2252	9 Parade Street	Pingelly	32.53387°S 117.083868°E	1893	7 October 1997		

Formerly on the State Register of Heritage Places:

Place name	Place #	Street name	Suburb or town	Co-ordinates	Built	State registered	Deregistered	Notes & former names	Photo
CBH Bins, Pingelly	5934	Quadrant Street	Pingelly	32.523338°S 117.080689°E	1962	1 August 2006	1 July 2021		
