= Moorumbine, Western Australia =

Moorumbine
- Town
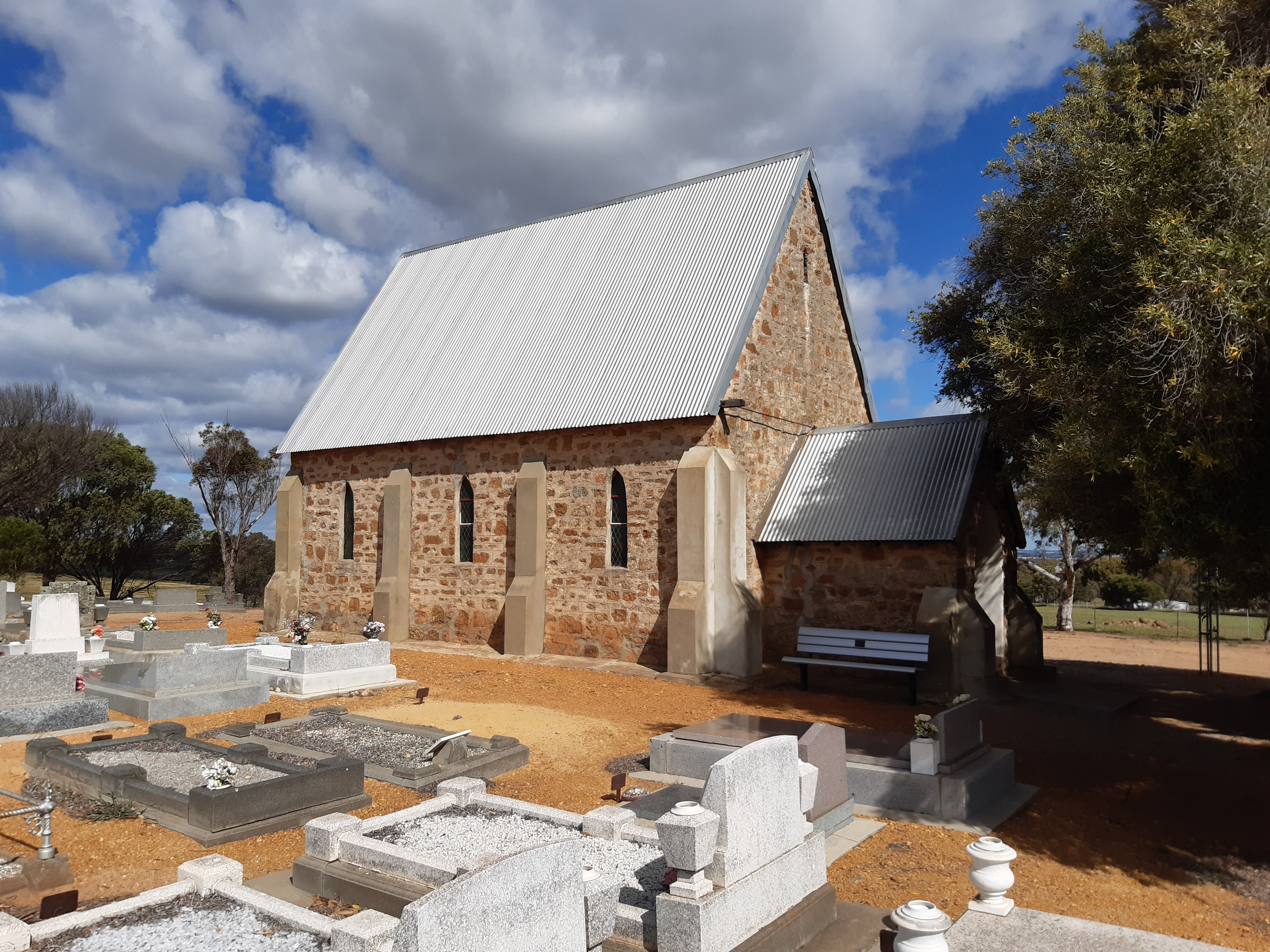
- St Patrick's Church of England, Moorumbine, in 2020

- Interactive map of Moorumbine
- Coordinates: 32.517°S 117.167°E
- Country: Australia
- State: Western Australia
- LGA: Shire of Pingelly
- Location: 165 km (103 mi) SE of Perth; 7 km (4.3 mi) E of Pingelly

Government
  - State electorate: Wagin
  - Federal division: O'Connor

Moorumbine, also spelt Mourambine, is a small town located between Brookton and Pingelly in the Wheatbelt region of Western Australia.

The area was first settled as a small agricultural community in the 1870s with an Anglican church, Saint Patricks, being built in 1873 at the expense of the local parishioners who raised the £77 required. The town was gazetted in 1884, which was prior to the planning and construction of the Great Southern Railway between Albany and Beverley. The railway passed 7 kilometres (4 mi) to the west of the town where the town of Pingelly now stands. This, in turn, led to the town becoming no longer needed and the population declined. The name Moorumbine is Aboriginal in origin but its meaning is unknown.

By early 1898 the population of the town was 161, 81 males and 80 females.
