= Balkuling, Western Australia =

Abandoned locality in the Wheatbelt region of Western Australia

Balkuling
- Town
- Coordinates: 31°59′S 117°07′E
- Country: Australia
- State: Western Australia
- LGA: Shire of Quairading
- Location: 192 km (119 mi) east of Perth; 28 km (17 mi) west of Quairading
- Established: 1920

Government
  - State electorate: Central Wheatbelt
  - Federal division: O’Connor

Area
  - Total: 82.3 km^{2} (31.8 sq mi)
- Elevation: 284 m (932 ft)

Population
  - Total: 21 (SAL 2021)
- Postcode: 6383

Balkuling is a town 192 km east of Perth, Western Australia along the Quairading-York Road situated in the Wheatbelt region of Western Australia.

The townsite of Balkuling was gazetted in 1920. The town originated as a siding on the Greenhills-Quairading railway line, which was established in 1907. The name of the town is Aboriginal in origin and is thought to mean walking and is also the name of the locale.

Balkuling was once a thriving wheatbelt town with many houses, shops and garages. A school was opened in the town hall in 1922 and continued until 1947 apart from a couple of closures due to lack of students. A new school was brought in from Bellakabella in 1947.
