= Dalmeny, New South Wales =

Dalmeny
- Town
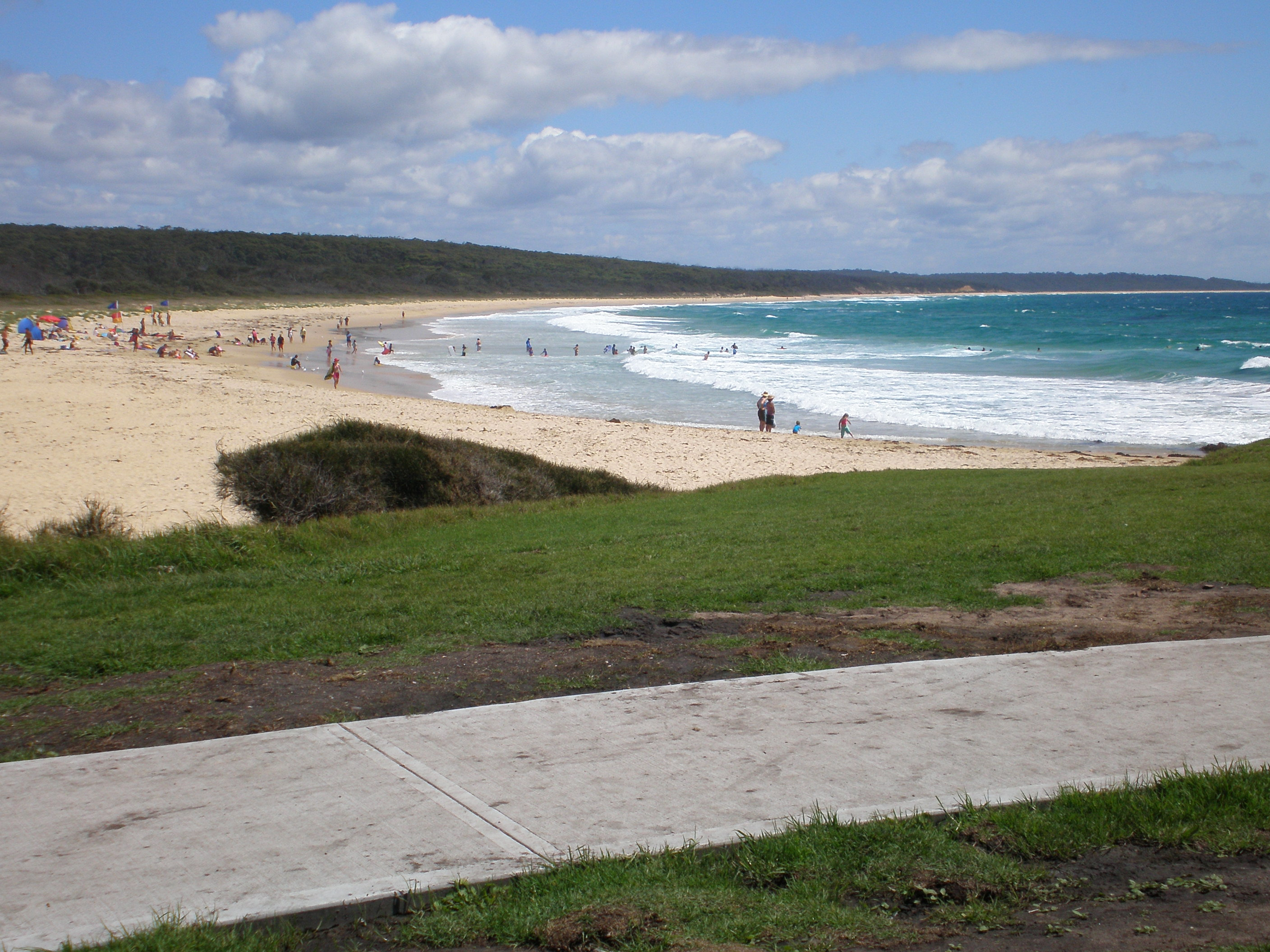
- Brou Beach

- Coordinates: 36°10′S 150°08′E
- Country: Australia
- State: New South Wales
- LGA: Eurobodalla Shire

Population
  - Total: 2,194 (2021 census)
- Postcode: 2546

Dalmeny is a town on the south coast of New South Wales, Australia, approximately seven kilometres north of Narooma. At the 2021 census, Dalmeny had a population of 2,194.

Dalmeny is a mainly residential area, with the town built upon headlands looking over the Tasman Sea to the south, and the shore of Lake Mummuga, a coastal lagoon, to the north. Due to its location, Dalmeny is a reasonably popular camping area, with a large camping ground located in the centre of town overlooking the southern end of Brou Beach (commonly called Dalmeny Beach, despite this technically being the next beach south). Brou (brue) beach should not be confused with Broulee (Brow-lee) to the north.

Despite the town's small and mainly residential nature, the town has a small shopping district in the centre of town, an industrial area to its north-west, and two retirement and aged-care facilities, as well as a bowling club with four greens and a small restaurant.

William Edye Mort (1850-1914) established Dalmeny Estate in 1880. William was the second son of Thomas Sutcliffe Mort who had established the township of Bodalla.

Mort the Younger named “Dalmeny‟ after his old Eton school friend Lord Dalmeny whose family home was Dalmeny House near Edinburgh (hence the proper pronunciation of Dal-men-ee).

There are many walking and cycling paths through Dalmeny, some along the coastline. Bushwalking is possible in some areas of the Eurobodalla National Park. Dalmeny also has many public boat ramps, picnic spots and lookouts and functional sporting fields.

== Access ==
There are two roads which lead into Dalmeny. Mort Avenue leads from the Princes Highway, and Dalmeny Drive leads from Kianga. Both these roads make up Tourist Drive 5, which provides views of Dalmeny's many beaches. There are many parking spaces in Dalmeny as well, particularly around Dalmeny Beach. There are also bus routes that run through Dalmeny connecting the town with the rest of the south coast.

== Beaches ==
Dalmeny is best known for its many beaches, which stretch right around the coastline. Dalmeny (Brou) Beach is the most popular beach, which is on the northern coastline. This beach is patrolled by lifeguards during summer, and is walking distance from shops and the camping ground. Dalmeny (Brou) Beach is great for swimming, surfing and bodyboarding. Dalmeny (Brou) Beach is also part of the Eurobodalla National Park.

Yabbara Beach is on the eastern coast of Dalmeny and is not patrolled by lifeguards at any time. This beach is more popular with surfers, as the waves here are usually stronger than Dalmeny Beach. Yabbara Beach also has many rocks to the side of the beach, which can pose a danger during rips.
