= Dattening, Western Australia =

Town in Wheatbelt region of Western Australia

Dattening
- Town
- Interactive map of Dattening
- Coordinates: 32.533°S 116.893°E
- Country: Australia
- State: Western Australia
- LGA: Shire of Pingelly
- Location: 178 km (111 mi) ESE of Perth; 20 km (12 mi) W of Pingelly
- Established: 1908

Government
  - State electorate: Wagin
  - Federal division: O'Connor
- Elevation: 320 m (1,050 ft)
- Postcode: 6308

Dattening is a small town in the Shire of Pingelly, between Boddington and Pingelly in the Wheatbelt region of Western Australia.

During the 1890s a farmer named Norris Taylor sunk a well in the locality and the area was initially known as Taylor's Well.

By 1906 the local progress association petitioned for a townsite to be surveyed and blocks were subdivided in 1907. Blocks were sold in 1908 with 20 "working men's blocks" being put on the market with prices between £8 and £14, equivalent to A$1,270 and A$2,223 respectively in 2022. The name, Dattening, was suggested as an alternative to Taylor's Well after this name had been rejected because it duplicated the name of a town in South Australia. The Morambine Road Board suggested the name Dattening, being the Aboriginal name of a spring in the vicinity of the well. The meaning of the name is unknown. The town was gazetted in 1908. The town residents petitioned for the name of the town to be changed to Taylor's Well in 1925, and 1929 but were unsuccessful on both occasions.
