= Balarang =

- Suburb
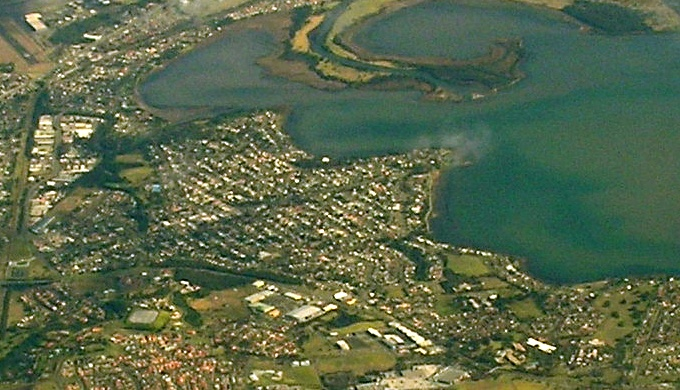
- Aerial photo from east

- Coordinates: 34°33′27″S 150°50′00″E
- Country: Australia
- State: New South Wales
- City: Wollongong
- LGA: City of Shellharbour

Government
  - State electorate: Shellharbour
  - Federal division: Whitlam
- Postcode: 2529
Suburbs around Balarang
Oak Flats	Balarang	Mount Warrigal
Albion Park Rail

Balarang is a suburb of Wollongong, New South Wales, Australia, located on the southern shore of Lake Illawarra. It is officially designated an urban place, and forms the eastern end of the suburb of Oak Flats.

The name is said to mean "place of swamp oak".

== See also ==
- Oak Flats
