= Eurobodalla National Park =

National park in New South Wales, Australia

- IUCN category II (national park)
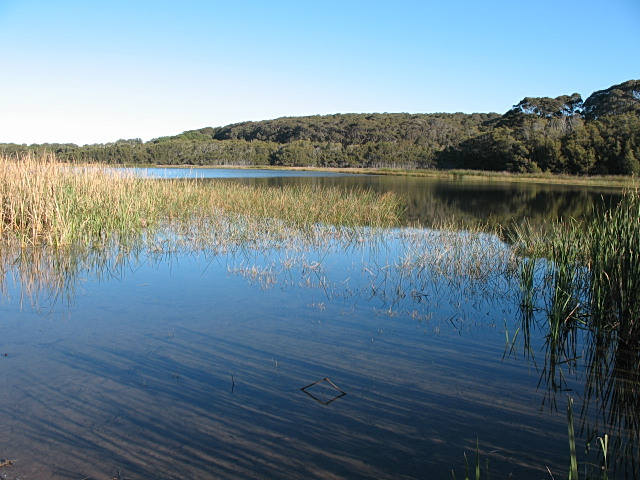
- Freshwater lake

- Location within New South Wales
- Location: New South Wales
- Nearest city: Narooma
- Coordinates: 36°07′50″S 150°06′56″E
- Area: 29.13 km^{2} (11.25 sq mi)
- Established: 22 December 1995
- Governing body: NSW National Parks and Wildlife Service
- Website: Official website

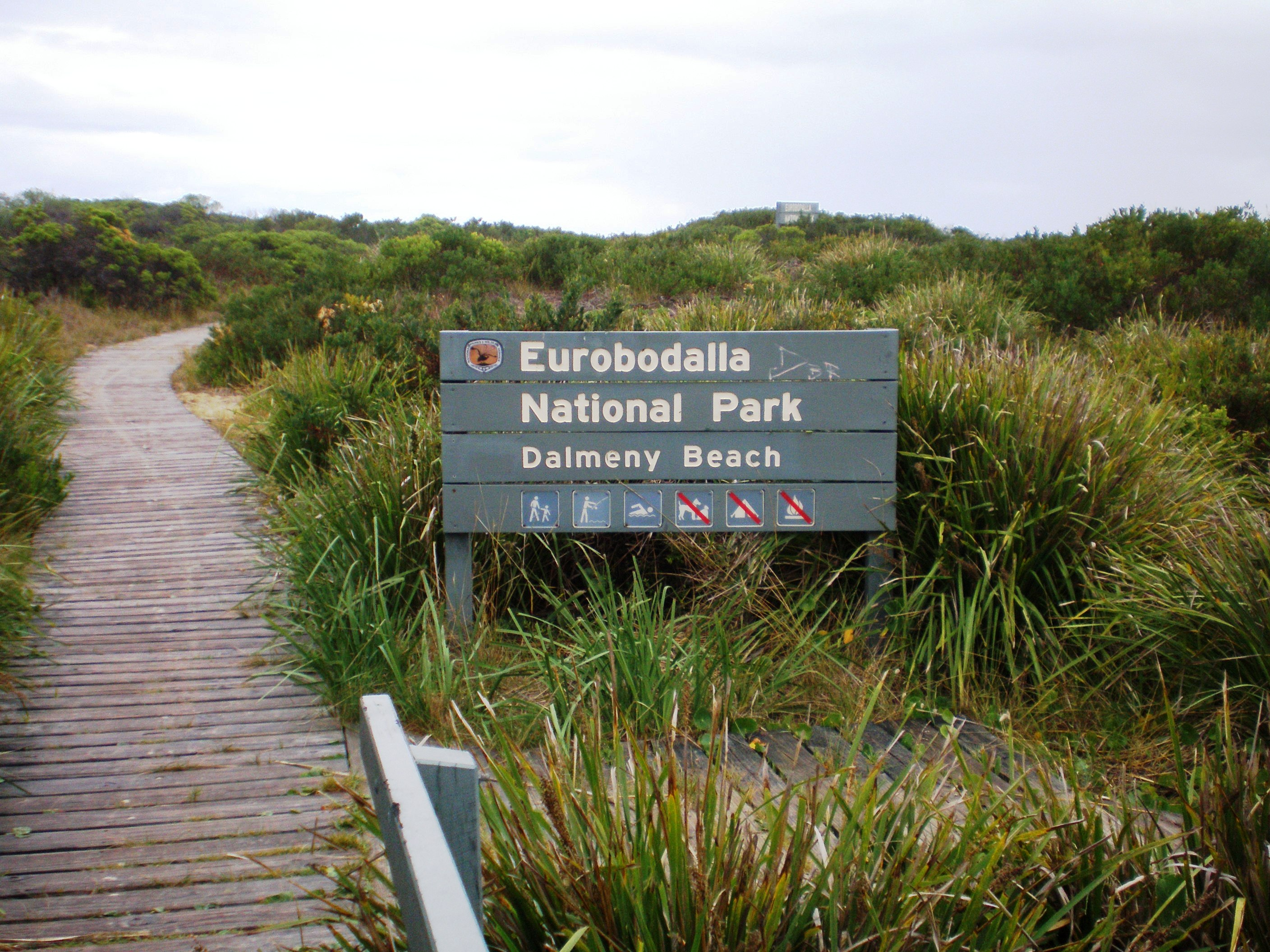
Eurobodalla National Park in Dalmeny on the NSW south coast

Eurobodalla National Park is a non-contiguous national park in New South Wales, Australia, 268 km southwest of Sydney spanning from Moruya Heads to Tilba Tilba Lake, 12 km south of Narooma. The park forms part of the Ulladulla to Merimbula Important Bird Area, identified as such by BirdLife International because of its importance for swift parrots.

== Fauna ==
131 species of birds have been recorded in the park. Many migratory birds use the coastal, estuarine and freshwater habitats of Eurobodalla National Park including the Far Eastern curlew, Eurasian whimbrel, greenshank, turnstone and bar-tailed godwit. Endangered species in the park include the long-nosed potoroo, white-footed dunnart, little tern and hooded plover.

== Features ==
Significant sites within the park are:

- Wreck of the SS Monaro
- Pilot station, South Head Moruya
- Toragy Point cemetery
- Wreck of the Kameruka

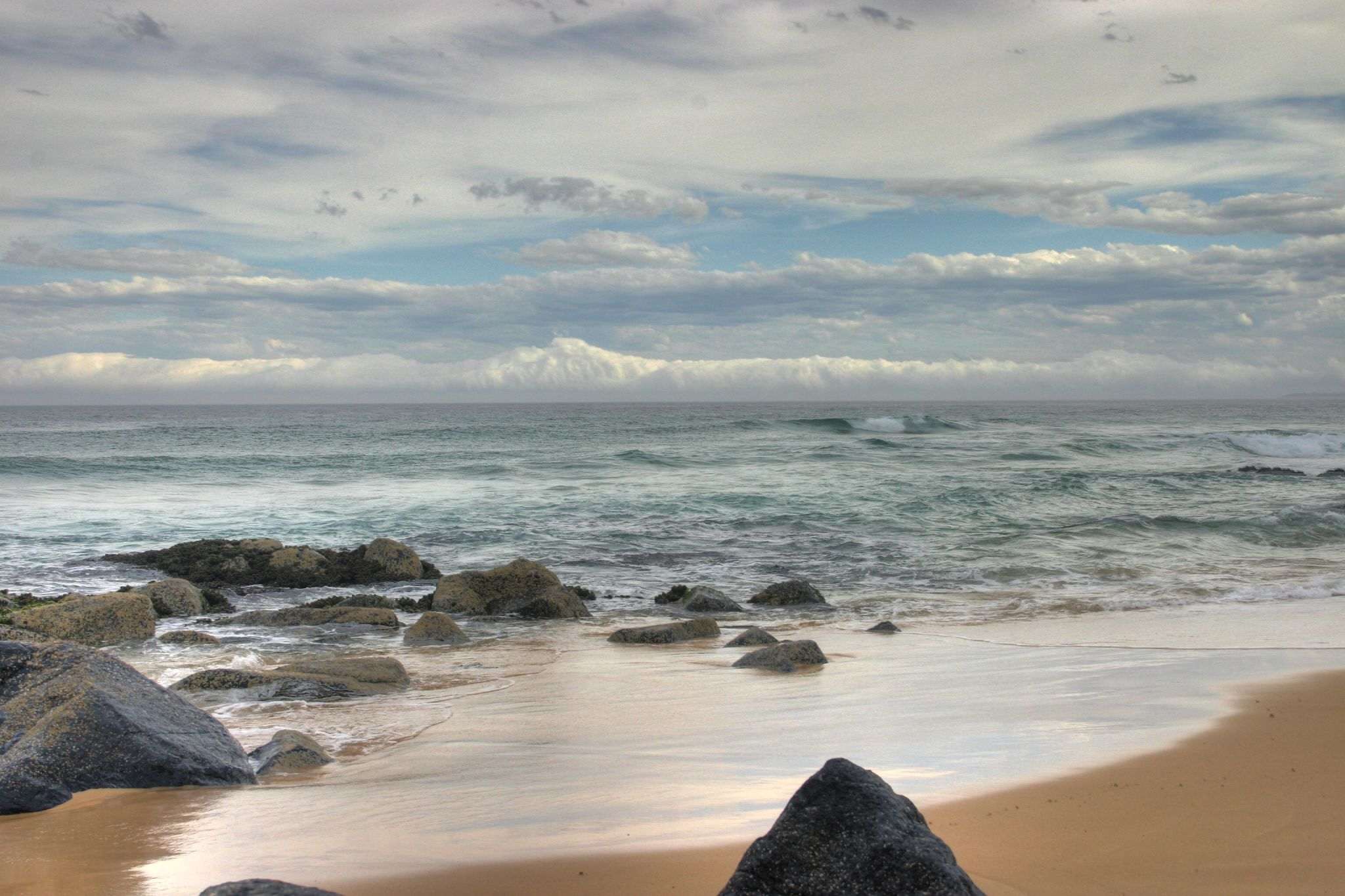
1080 Beach

== See also ==
- Protected areas of New South Wales
