= Wonboyn =

Wonboyn may refer to:

- Wonboyn, New South Wales, a village in New South Wales, Australia
- Wonboyn Lake, a tidal lake in New South Wales, Australia
- Wonboyn River, a barrier estuary or perennial stream in New South Wales, Australia
