= HMAS Barwon =

1944 River-class frigate

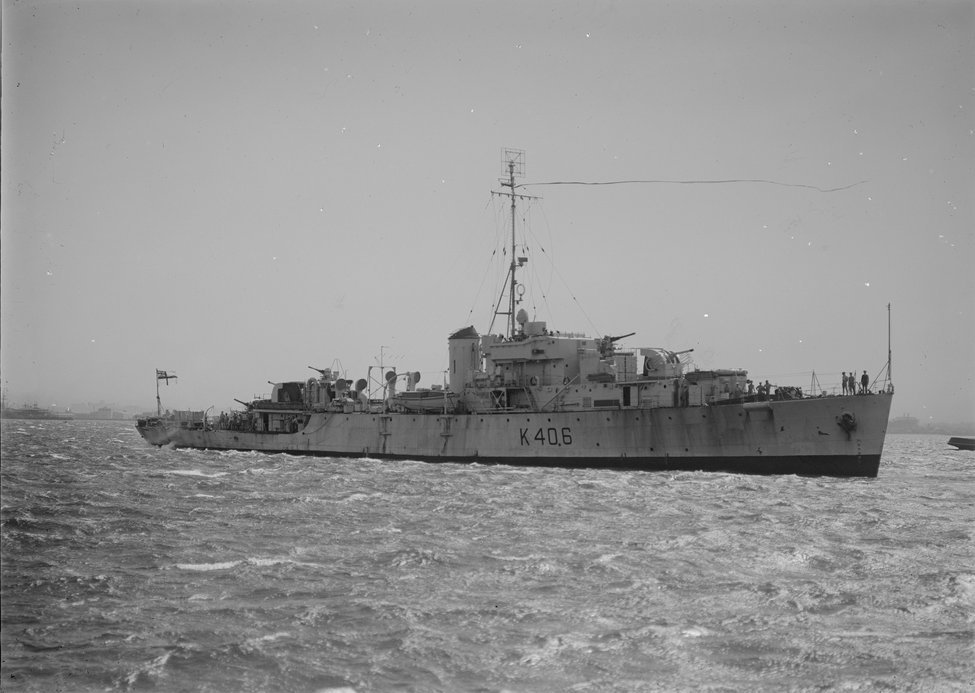
- HMAS Barwon

History

Australia
- Name: Barwon
- Namesake: Barwon River
- Builder: Cockatoo Docks & Engineering Company, Sydney
- Laid down: 31 May 1943
- Launched: 3 August 1944
- Commissioned: 10 December 1945
- Decommissioned: 31 March 1947
- Motto: "By the right use of Gods Gift"
- Fate: Sold for scrap January 1962
- Badge

General characteristics
- Class & type: River-class frigate
- Displacement: 1,420 long tons (1,440 t; 1,590 short tons); 2,020 long tons (2,052 t; 2,262 short tons) (deep load)
- Length: 283 ft (86.26 m) p/p; 301.25 ft (91.82 m) o/a
- Beam: 36.5 ft (11.13 m)
- Draught: 9 ft (2.74 m); 13 ft (3.96 m) (deep load)
- Propulsion: 2 × Admiralty 3-drum boilers, 2 shafts, reciprocating vertical triple expansion, 5,500 ihp (4,100 kW)
- Speed: 20 knots (37 km/h; 23 mph)
- Range: 500 long tons (510 t; 560 short tons) oil fuel; 5,180 nautical miles (9,590 km; 5,960 mi) at 12 knots (22 km/h; 14 mph)
- Complement: 140
- Armament: 2 × QF 4 in (102 mm) /45 Mk.XVI, single mounts HA/LA Mk.XX; 8 × QF 20 mm Oerlikon, single mounts Mk.III, later; 3 × QF 40 mm Bofors, single mounts Mk.VII; 4 × QF 20 mm Oerlikon, twin mounts Mk.V; 1 × Hedgehog 24 spigot A/S projector; up to 50 depth charges

HMAS Barwon (K406) was a River-class frigate that served the Royal Australian Navy (RAN) from 1945 to 1947. She was named for the Barwon River in Victoria and was one of eight River-class frigates built for the RAN during World War II.

== Construction ==
HMAS Barwon was one of eight River-class frigates built for the RAN during World War II. She was laid down on 31 May 1943 at Cockatoo Docks & Engineering Company, Sydney, launched on 3 August 1944 and commissioned on 10 December 1945.

== Operational history ==
Following a period of training Barwon departed Sydney on an operational patrol on 14 February 1946. She visited Darwin before sailing to the Philippines. After a period in Filipino waters she returned to Darwin where she was used to dump ammunition at sea and inspect coastal navigation lights. She also transported members of a war crimes tribunal to Koepang in Timor. She returned to Sydney by 1 July 1946 and underwent a refit from that date until 29 August.

Once the refit was complete Barwon sailed to New Guinea where she was again used to inspect and repair coastal lights and dump ammunition. She arrived in Melbourne on 20 January 1947 and was taken out of commission. She subsequently paid off to reserve on 31 March 1947. In April that year she was fitted with two Squid anti-submarine mortars.

Barwon was not reactivated after entering reserve and was sold for scrapping in January 1962.
