= Shire of Quairading =

Local government area in the Wheatbelt region of Western Australia

Coordinates: 32°00′36″S 117°23′56″E

- Local government area
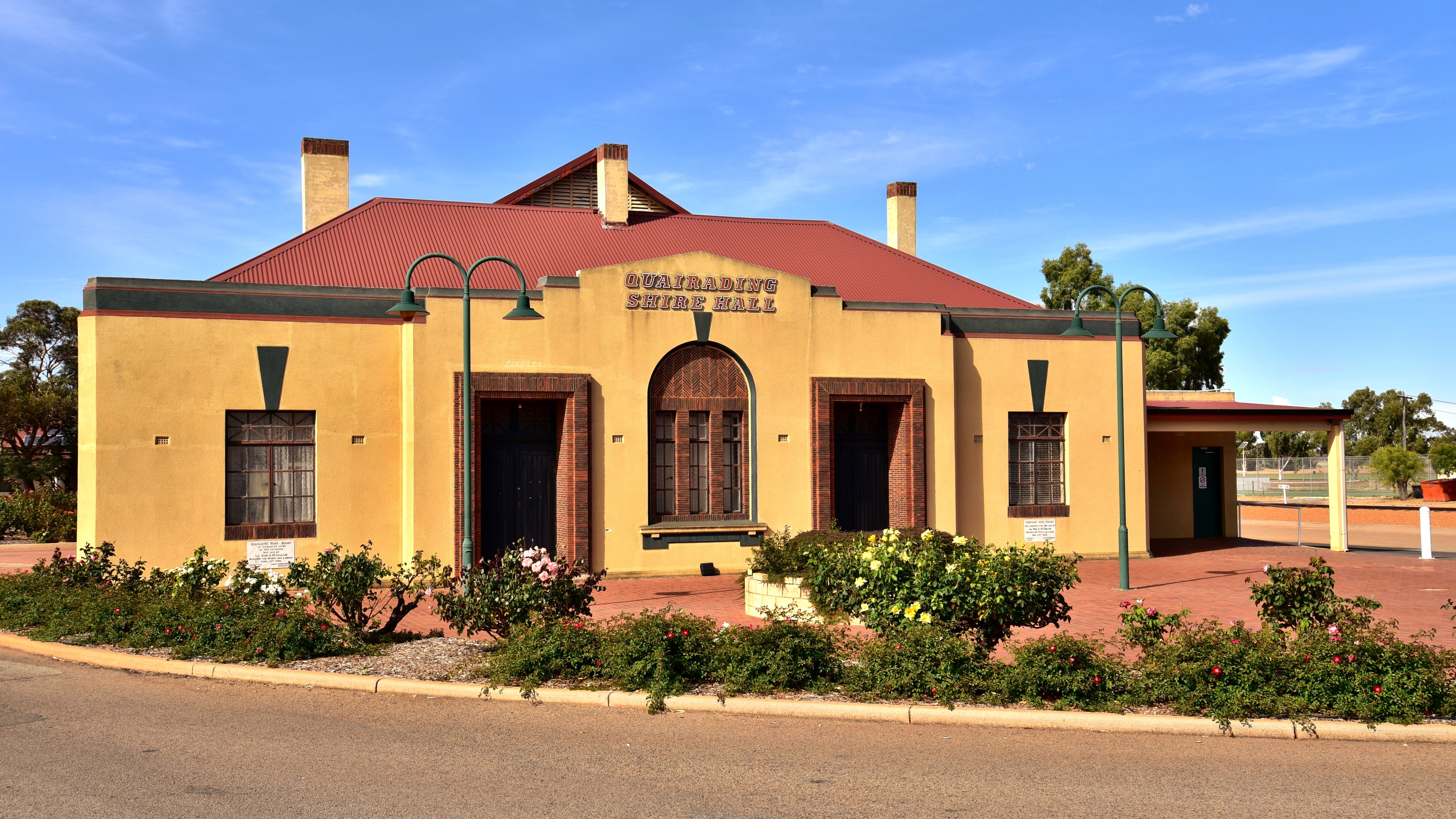
- Quairading Shire Hall, 2018

- Interactive map of Shire of Quairading
- Country: Australia
- State: Western Australia
- Region: Wheatbelt
- Established: 1913
- Council seat: Quairading

Government
  - Shire President: Peter Smith
  - State electorate: Central Wheatbelt
  - Federal division: Durack

Area
  - Total: 2,017.8 km^{2} (779.1 sq mi)

Population
  - Total: 961 (LGA 2021)
- Website: Shire of Quairading
LGAs around Shire of Quairading
Cunderdin	Tammin	Kellerberrin
York; Beverley	Shire of Quairading	Bruce Rock
Brookton	Corrigin	Corrigin

The Shire of Quairading is a local government area in the Wheatbelt region of Western Australia, about 170 kilometres (106 mi) east of the state capital, Perth. The Shire covers an area of 2,018 square kilometres (779 sq mi), and its seat of government is the town of Quairading.

== History ==
Quairading was initially constituted as the Greenhills Road District on 15 December 1892, covering a large area east of York. The district was broken up on 14 February 1913, with Greenhills renamed the Avon Road District and large parts of the former district separated as the new East Avon Road District and Kunjinn Road District.

The Avon Road District was renamed to the Quairading Road District on 12 May 1922. On 1 July 1961, it became a shire as the Shire of Quairading under the Local Government Act 1960, which reformed all remaining road districts into shires.

== Wards ==
The Shire is no longer divided into wards and the seven councillors sit at large. Prior to the 2003 elections, there were eleven councillors representing five wards: Town (3), Southwest, Southeast, Northwest and Northeast (2 each).

== Towns and localities ==
The towns and localities of the Shire of Quairading with population and size figures based on the most recent Australian census:

Locality	Population	Area	Map
Badjaling	26 (SAL 2021)	84.2 km^{2} (32.5 sq mi)	
Balkuling	21 (SAL 2021)	82.3 km^{2} (31.8 sq mi)	
Cubbine	27 (SAL 2021)	168.3 km^{2} (65.0 sq mi)	
Dangin	31 (SAL 2021)	75.4 km^{2} (29.1 sq mi)	
Doodenanning	51 (SAL 2021)	125.9 km^{2} (48.6 sq mi)	
Dulbelling	52 (SAL 2021)	167.5 km^{2} (64.7 sq mi)	
Mount Stirling	16 (SAL 2021)	207.6 km^{2} (80.2 sq mi)	
Pantapin	25 (SAL 2021)	219.5 km^{2} (84.7 sq mi)	
Quairading	619 (SAL 2021)	200.5 km^{2} (77.4 sq mi)	
South Quairading	54 (SAL 2021)	338 km^{2} (131 sq mi)	
Wamenusking	21 (SAL 2021)	232 km^{2} (90 sq mi)	
Yoting	17 (SAL 2021)	115.5 km^{2} (44.6 sq mi)	

== Population ==
Historical population

Year	Pop.	±% p.a.
1921	1,273	—
1933	1,754	+2.71%
1947	1,424	−1.48%
1954	1,721	+2.74%
1961	1,789	+0.56%
1966	1,687	−1.17%
1971	1,652	−0.42%
1976	1,470	−2.31%
1981	1,300	−2.43%

Year	Pop.	±% p.a.
1986	1,243	−0.89%
1991	1,147	−1.59%
1996	1,173	+0.45%
2001	1,041	−2.36%
2006	1,022	−0.37%
2011	1,043	+0.41%
2016	1,019	−0.46%
2021	961	−1.17%

== Heritage-listed places ==
As of 2023, 233 places are heritage-listed in the Shire of Quairading, of which seven are on the State Register of Heritage Places.
