= Culburra =

Culburra may refer to:

- Culburra Beach, New South Wales, a town in Australia
- Culburra, South Australia, a town and locality
- a former name of Clare, Queensland, Australia
