= Dangin, Western Australia =

Dangin
- Town
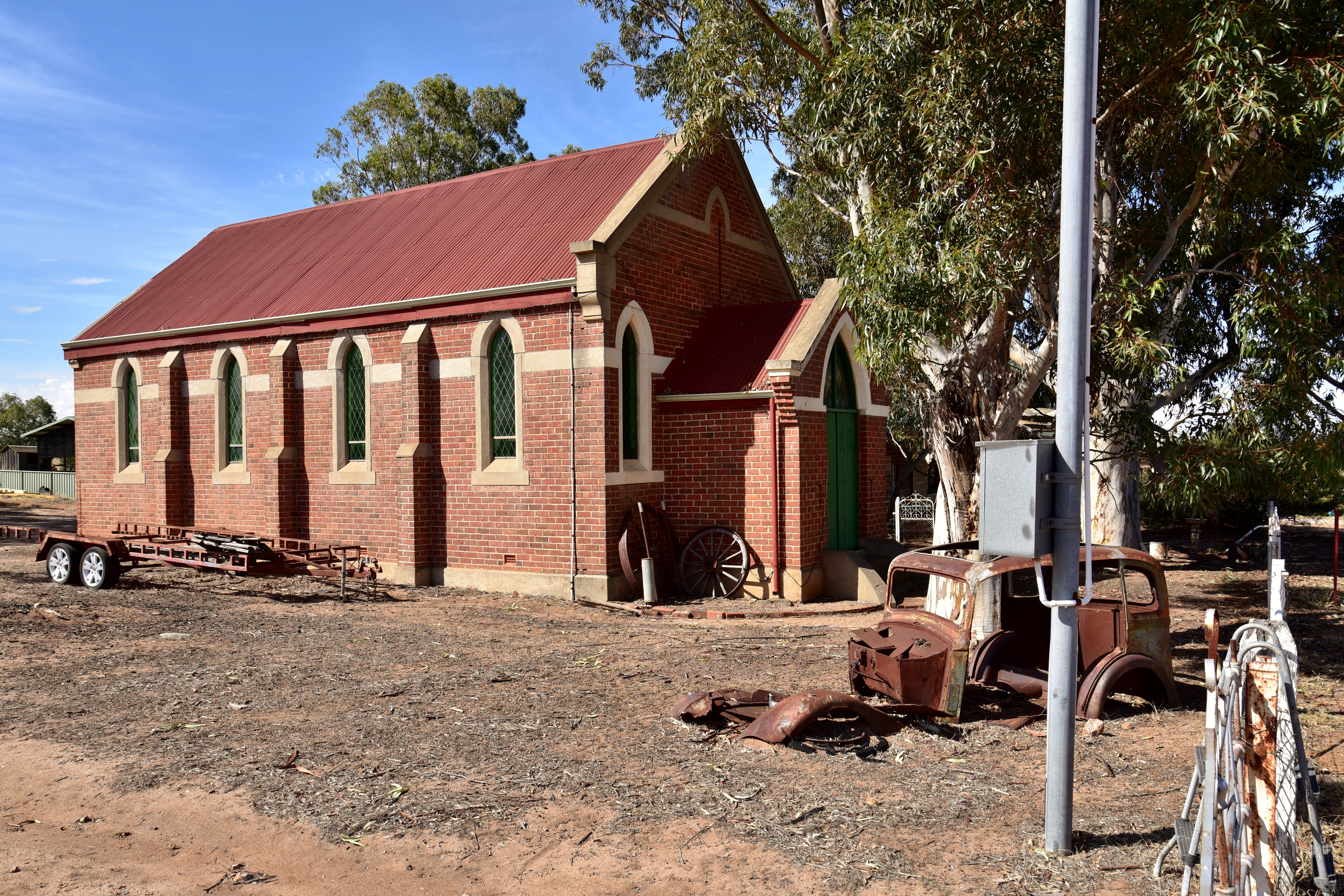
- The former Dangin Methodist Church, 2018

- Interactive map of Dangin
- Coordinates: 32.04°S 117.33°E
- Country: Australia
- State: Western Australia
- LGA: Shire of Quairading
- Location: 160 km (99 mi) E of Perth; 7 km (4.3 mi) SW of Quairading
- Established: 1902

Government
  - State electorate: Central Wheatbelt
  - Federal division: O'Connor

Area
  - Total: 75.4 km^{2} (29.1 sq mi)
- Elevation: 259 m (850 ft)

Population
  - Total: 31 (SAL 2021)
- Postcode: 6383

Dangin is a small town in the Wheatbelt region of Western Australia, about 7.7 kilometres (4.8 mi) west-south-west of Quairading, in the Shire of Quairading. At the 2006 census, Dangin had a population of 283.

Dangin is named after the nearby Dangin Spring, which is in turn thought to be an Australian Aboriginal place name meaning "place where the Djanja grows" – Djanja being a species of Hakea that grows in the area. The name was first recorded in 1863, as the name of the farm owned by Edward Read Parker, son of the first European settler in the region.

In about 1900, E. P. Parker's son Jonah, into whose hands the land had passed, began subdividing the property, to allow development of an unofficial townsite. While the town was formally gazetted in 1902, Jonah Parker owned all of the surrounding land and access to the town was limited. Initially, the sale of alcohol was prohibited, although hospitality was provided by a "temperance hotel".

By 1908, Quairading – 7.7 kilometres (4.8 mi) east-northeast – had been connected by rail, and was gazetted as a townsite. Following the rail connection, facilities such as a conventional hotel were also constructed in Quairading. The newer town was also slightly closer to the water supply it shared with Dangin, at Toapin Weir.

By the early 21st century, only a handful of houses remained in Dangin. Quairading had long since taken over as the main local centre.

== Dangin Gate case ==
During the 1910s, Parker made public some of their lands from their farm into an allocation of a schoolhouse, but in 1912 a teacher wrote to the Department of Education complaining that Parker was threatening to keep locked a gate in a fence that ran right through the grounds of the township, because people using that gate were leaving it open, allowing Parker's crops to be at risk. However this led to difficulty in accessing the township itself. This led to a petition from the townspeople in asking the government to take over the township. However after a public meeting a couple of weeks later the ratepayers repudiated this move. Parker then proposed to the board to fence certain roads into the town and he would fence off the town-site and remove the gate. This was rejected on the grounds of cost. In October 1912 the board removed the gate, which exposed Parker's land to cattle. Parker responded by promising that if the gate were replaced it could be left open during the day, and he himself would pay for it to be closed at night. This was refused. In 1913 there was a Supreme Court decision affecting the Greenhills Road Board where they had removed a gate across the South Caroling Road. There was a dispute from Jonah, who owned the gate. But the court ruled against him, allowing the gate to be removed. With this precedent, in May 1914 the annual ratepayers meeting in Dangin announced that they would submit the dispute to the Federal High Court. When asked if the board first consult the ratepayers before submitting the case the Chairman declined "on the grounds that it did not concern them, this sapient remark aroused a storm of hilarious derision from the meeting". When the dispute was submitted to the court, it found that the Board was wrong in removing the gate, and in fact did not make a "landmark" decision and the Board had to pay £102.3s to the Parkers. All the members of the board responsible were removed on the exception of the Chairman after this scuffle.

In 1920 when the Repatriation Department was looking for large holdings to create blocks for returned soldiers, the park estate was considered ideal when the property was divided into 19 lots. It went before a board that included Thomas Richard. Charles Kirkwood, the 22 successful applicants were paid nine shillings a day by the industrial assistance board to get them started; that lease was for 25 years. One reason why the park estate was particularly attractive to the reparation apartment was the reliable water supply that been established. Thanks were to Parker's enterprising schemes the Toapin Weir that was able to safeguard the growth of a thriving community and growing pastoral industry a constant water supply was the necessity and the Parkers had the means the resources and the determination to achieve this end.
