= Kianga, New South Wales =

Kianga
- Town
- Coordinates: 36°12′S 150°08′E
- Country: Australia
- State: New South Wales
- LGA: Eurobodalla Shire
- Location: 344 km (214 mi) SW of Sydney; 66 km (41 mi) S of Batemans Bay; 2 km (1.2 mi) N of Narooma

Government
  - State electorate: Bega
  - Federal division: Eden-Monaro

Population
  - Total: 738 (2011 census)
- Postcode: 2546

Kianga is a small town on the South Coast of New South Wales, Australia, immediately north of the town of Narooma. The town contains few facilities and thus relies on nearby Dalmeny and Narooma. At the 2011 census, Kianga had a population of 738.

== Access ==
Kianga is situated between Dalmeny to the north and North Narooma to the south. Kianga is accessible from the north and south along Dalmeny Drive. This makes up a large portion of Tourist Drive 5 along the coastline. There are bus routes that run through Kianga connecting the town with the rest of the south coast. The Narooma to Dalmeny Cycleway also passes along the coast through Kianga allowing for access on foot or by bicycle

== Beaches ==
There are three beaches in Kianga, Kianga Beach, Kianga Reef Beach and Carters Beach. Kianga Lake is part of the Batemans Marine Park and is classified as a Sanctuary Zone, prohibiting all types of recreational fishing. The mouth of the lake marks the latitude (36°11.536′S) where the ocean zoning changes from General Use Zone, north of the latitudinal line to Habitat Protection Zone, south of the line.

== Other ==
The sewage treatment plant, west of Kianga, services the local area including Dalmeny and Narooma.
