= Boolading, Western Australia =

Boolading
- Town
- Interactive map of Boolading
- Coordinates: 33°21′S 116°38′E
- Country: Australia
- State: Western Australia
- LGA: Shire of West Arthur
- Location: 212 km (132 mi) south of Perth; 11 km (6.8 mi) west of Darkan
- Established: 1909

Government
  - State electorate: Roe
  - Federal division: O'Connor
- Elevation: 281 m (922 ft)
- Postcode: 6392

Boolading is a location along the Coalfields Highway between Darkan and Collie in the Wheatbelt region of Western Australia.

The name is Aboriginal in origin but the meaning is unknown. The word Boola means plenty or abundance of in the local dialect.

Boolading began as a railway siding on the Brunswick Junction to Narrogin railway line when Western Australian Government Railways constructed it in 1907. The townsite was gazetted in 1909 and the name was suggested by the district surveyor after a property owned by an acquaintance of his, William Gibbs. It was initially spelt Bulading; the spelling was changed in 1955.

Located along the Collie River, the area is now good pastureland and suitable for a variety of agricultural practices.

Land was first opened for selection in the area in 1894. A water-hole known as Boolading is also near the location; this was the site chosen by the first settlers in the area, William and Sarah-Ann Gibbs, who settled in 1874 and built a split slab home, which was replaced in 1899 by a mud brick home that still stands today. The home was also used as a place for shooters to store skins until a buyer was found. Gibbs later became a property guide and helped survey the Collie – Narrogin railway line.

A telephone exchange operated in Boolading from 1925 until 1952.
