= Barwon River =

Barwon River may refer to:

- Barwon River (New South Wales), Australia
- Barwon River (Victoria), Australia
