= Quairading =

- Town
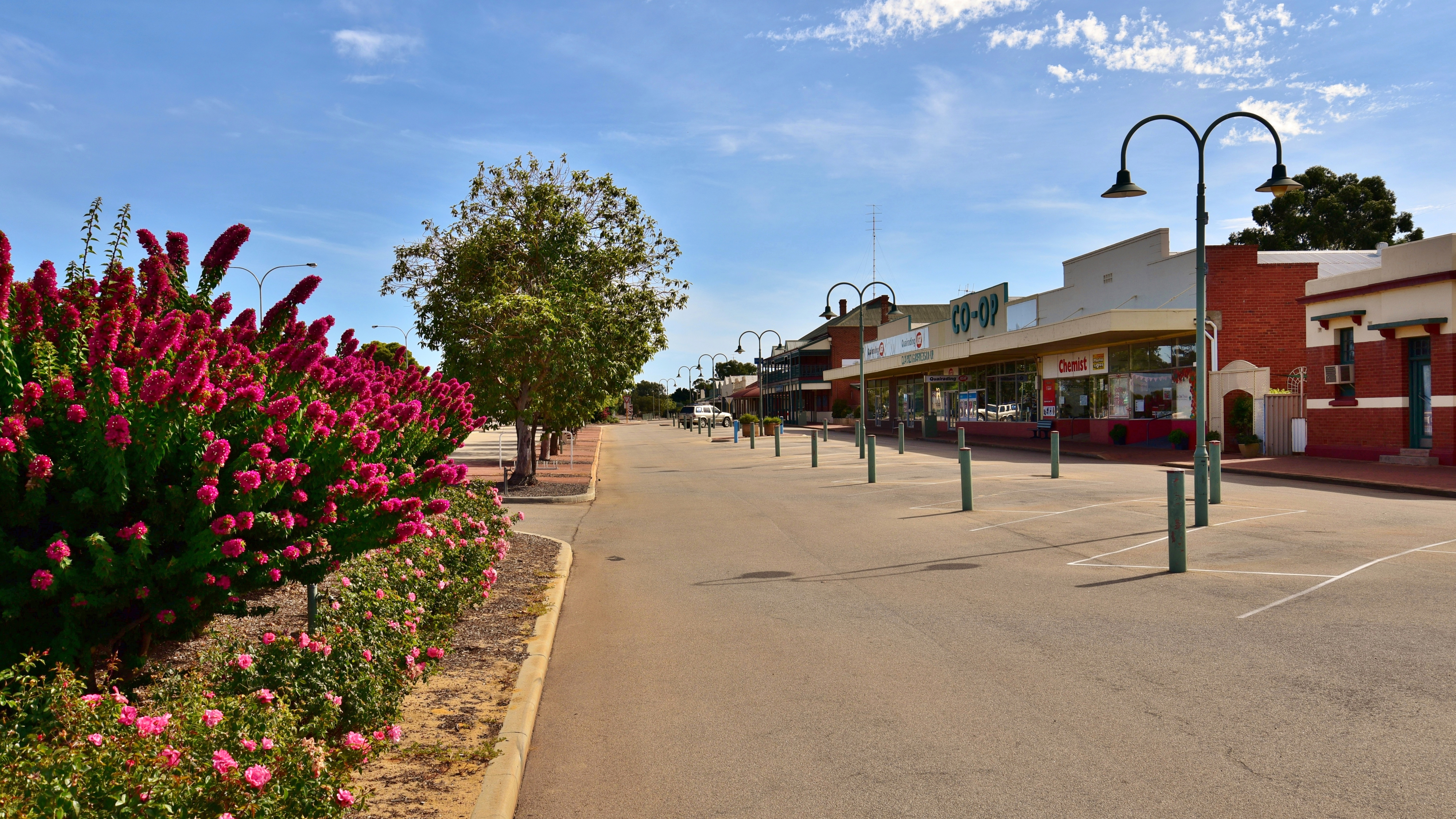
- Heal Street, Quairading, 2018

- Interactive map of Quairading
- Coordinates: 32°01′00″S 117°24′00″E
- Country: Australia
- State: Western Australia
- LGA: Shire of Quairading
- Location: 166 km (103 mi) east of Perth; 69 km (43 mi) east of York
- Established: 1907

Government
  - State electorate: Central Wheatbelt
  - Federal division: Durack

Area
  - Total: 200.5 km^{2} (77.4 sq mi)
- Elevation: 249 m (817 ft)

Population
  - Total: 582 (UCL 2021)
- Postcode: 6383

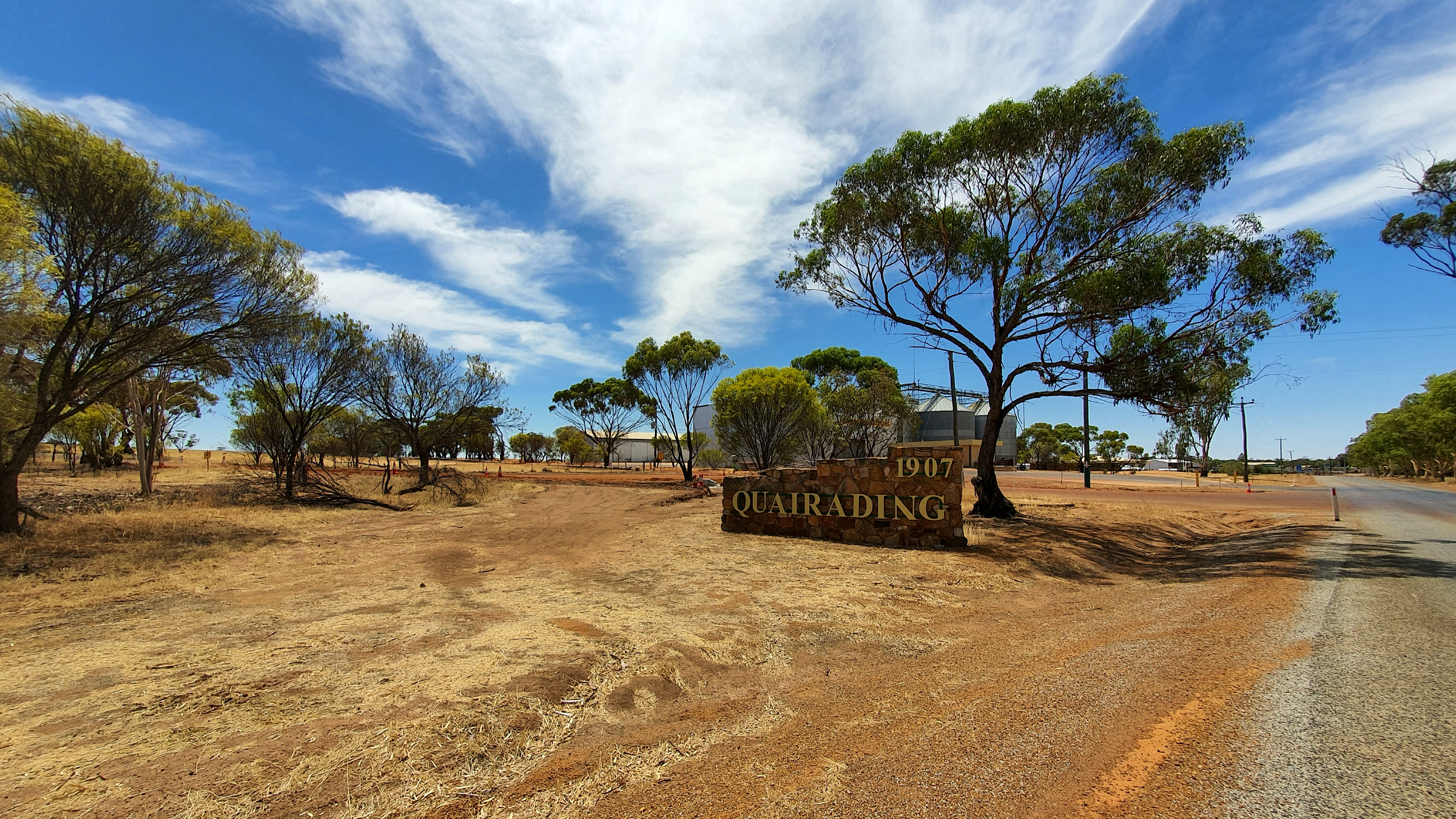
The sign at the entry to the town

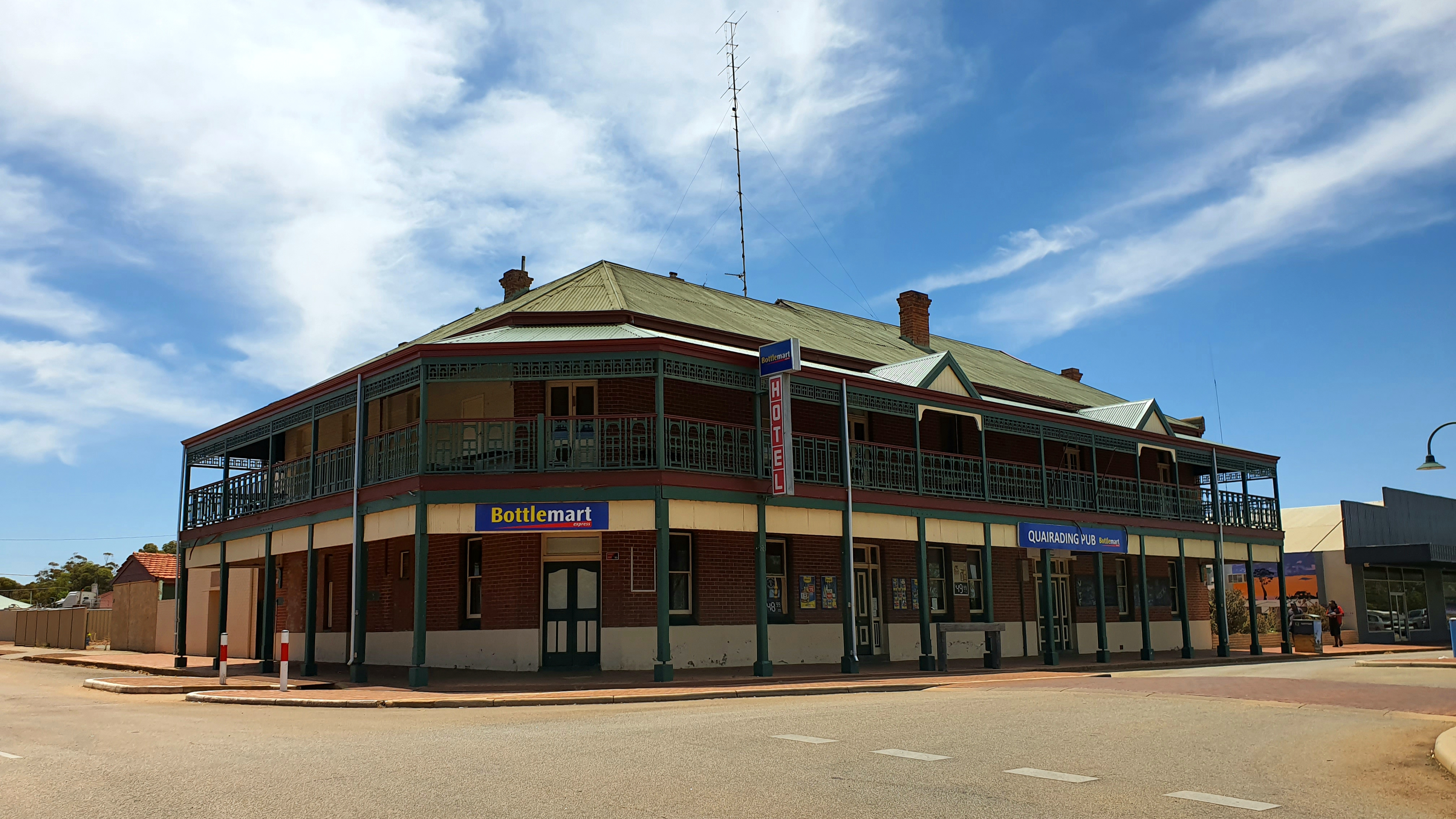
Bottlemart Quairading hotel and bottle shop

Quairading is a Western Australian town located in the Wheatbelt region. It is the seat of government for the Shire of Quairading.

== History ==
The town was named for Quairading Spring, derived from a local Aboriginal word recorded in 1872 by surveyor Alexander Forrest. The first European settler in the area is believed to be Stephen Parker, who settled in nearby York. From 1859 to 1863, his son Edward Parker cleared land east of York towards Dangin, before Edward's son Jonah took over Dangin and the surrounding area. Jonah Parker subdivided his property and made Dangin a private townsite, surrounded by his land. A Methodist, Jonah Parker banned alcohol in the town and these factors led to residents leaving Dangin. The Government made available new land in nearby Quairading, and gave settlers a 65-hectare (160-acre) block for free if they cleared the land and lived there for seven years. Many settlers took up the offer and moved into the area between 1903 and 1908.

The Greenhills Road Board, established in 1892, decided to build a railway from Greenhills (near York) to Quairading and gazette the townsite at the Quairading terminus. The townsite was gazetted on 7 August 1907 and the railway completed in 1908. By 1909, the town had a hotel, general store, blacksmith, baker, carpenter and two banks, and by 1950, most of the land was cleared and being used for farming.

In 1932, the Wheat Pool of Western Australia announced that the town would have two grain elevators, each fitted with an engine, installed at the railway siding.

The area was rocked by an earthquake in April 2009; the epicentre was located approximately 20 kilometres (12 mi) northwest of the town. The earthquake that measured 3.2 on the Richter Scale happened at 4:50 am local time caused no damage.

== Railway ==
The railway through Quairading began as the York to Greenhills line (about a sixth the length of the whole line), and this was later extended to Quairading and onward to Bruce Rock. Construction began in 1897. Due to various operational changes, the line between Quairading and Bruce Rock was closed in the 1970s, and the line from York was closed in October 2013, the operator Brookfield Rail citing safety as the primary reason. The decision to close this half of the line was politically contentious, with Brookfield Rail taking pains to point out that it was not politics that forced the closure, and community groups (such as the Wheatbelt Rail Retention Alliance) campaigning against it.

== Demographics ==
In the 2006 census, Quairading had 596 residents, with 18.1% Indigenous residents, compared with 2.3% Indigenous persons Australia-wide. The median age of residents was 49 years, compared to the national median age of 37. The religious affiliation of residents was Anglican 31.4%, Catholic 19.3%, no religion 16.1%, Uniting Church 12.9% and Pentecostal 1.8%. The percentage of people identifying themselves as Anglican (31.4%) was significantly higher than the Australia-wide average of 18.7%. 90.4% of residents were Australian citizens, with English the language spoken at home by 95.6% persons, compared to the national average of 78.5%. The most common occupations were labourers 18.4%, managers 17.0%, technicians and trades workers 15.7%, machinery operators and drivers 10.8%, and sales workers 10.3%. The major industries were farming of sheep, beef cattle and grain 14.8%, local government administration 10.3%, school education 8.5%, wholesaling of specialised industrial machinery and equipment 4.9%, and retailing of fuel 4.9%. The median household weekly income was A$637, compared to $1,027 nationally.

== Amenities and facilities ==
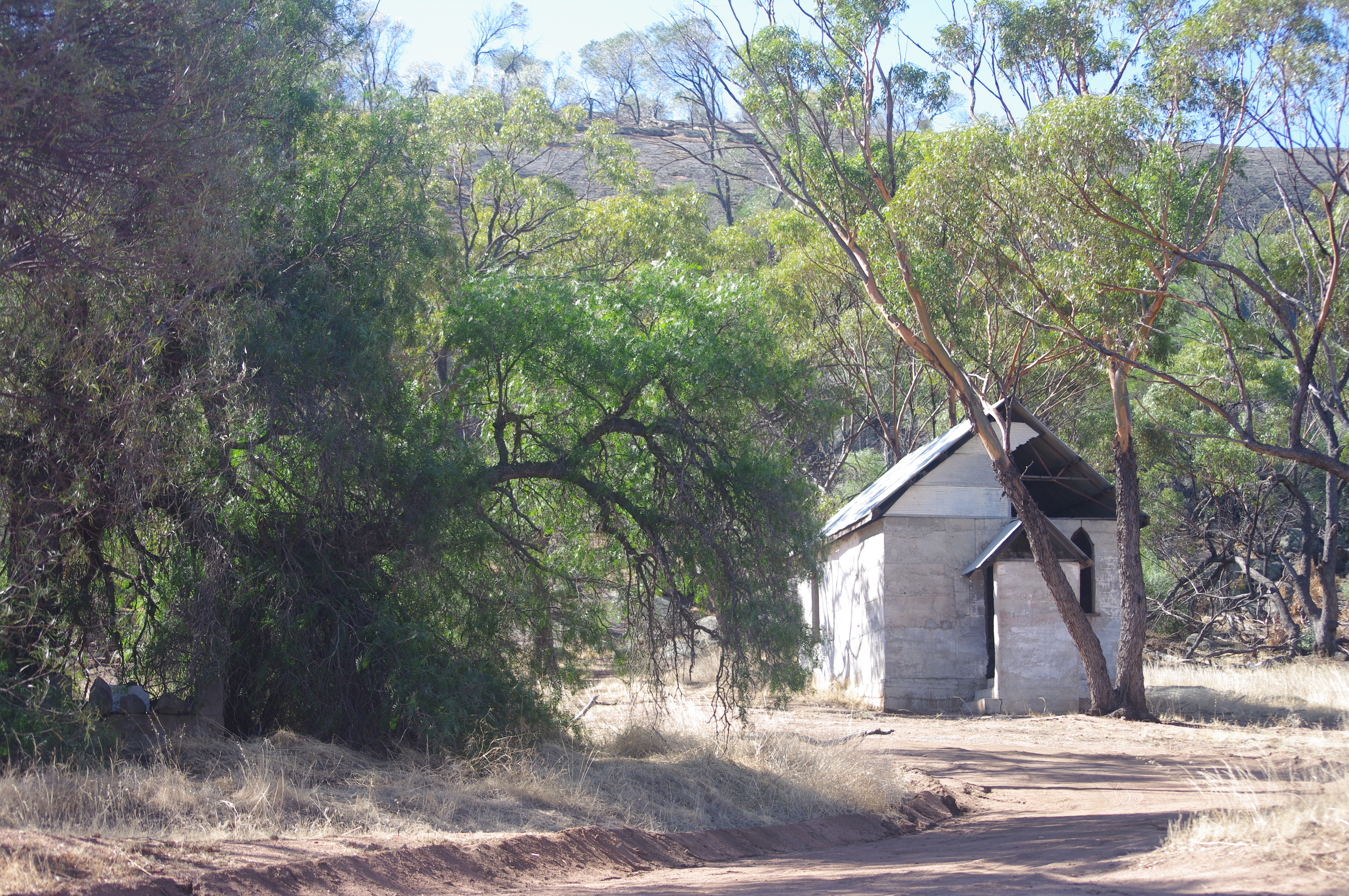
Church and graveyard at the foot of Mount Stirling

The Pink Lake of Quairading which lies 11 kilometres (6.8 mi) east of Quairading on the Bruce Rock Road at Badjaling, with the road traversing it. It is regarded as a phenomenon, as certain times in the year one side has a distinctive pink colour whilst the other side remains its natural blue.

A local tourist attraction is the Quairading Nature Reserve, 527 hectares (1,302 acres) of native bushland west of the town along the railway line to York. The reserve contains York gum, salmon gum, wandoo and casuarina trees, and wildlife including the eastern wallaroo, western grey kangaroo, echidnas, reptiles and birds. Nookaminnie Rock, which is a large granite rock, provides a view over the town and surrounding areas.

The townsite can also be viewed from Mount Stirling, 35 kilometres (22 mi) northeast of Quairading. The Home of Natural Wood Sculpture is another visitor attraction, originally located 22 kilometres (14 mi) northeast of the town. Founded by local artist Ian Wills, it displays his wood sculptures, which have been exhibited in Sydney, Adelaide and Perth. The wood sculptures are now on display in the Old Railway Station Info Centre and is open every weekday morning by volunteers. Toapin Weir, 12 kilometres (7 mi) northwest of the town, was constructed in 1912 to collect rainwater runoff and irrigate the nearby farms; it has barbeque, picnic and camping facilities. Cubbine is a homestead 17 kilometres (11 mi) north of Quairading originally owned by Alexander Forrest.

Quairading has an airstrip, located 300 metres (984 ft) east of the town on the York to Merredin Road. The town has a library, located at Quairading Bookpost, a very popular Community Resource Centre and a number of small parks, including a memorial rose garden, and a public swimming pool. The Greater Sports Ground is home to football, hockey, cricket and netball.

== Badjaling Community ==
The Badjaling Mission reserve, located 10 kilometres (6.2 mi) east of Quairding, established in 1933 for the United Aborigines Mission, encompassed the area initially comprising all the land within Department of Environment and Conservation Reserve 23758. Serving as the camping ground and residence for approximately 30 Nyungar families from 1887 until 1954, the reserve held significant cultural importance, having been utilized by local Nyungar communities for traditional hunting, food gathering, and camping prior to colonization, owing to its abundant freshwater sources. Despite the official relocation of residents to Quairading Reserve in 1954 following the mission's closure, Nyungar people intermittently continued to camp in the area. In 1980, there was a formal return of Nyungar people to the Reserve, with current housing infrastructure established in 1998.

== See also ==
- The Avon Gazette and York Times
