= Pingelly =

- Town
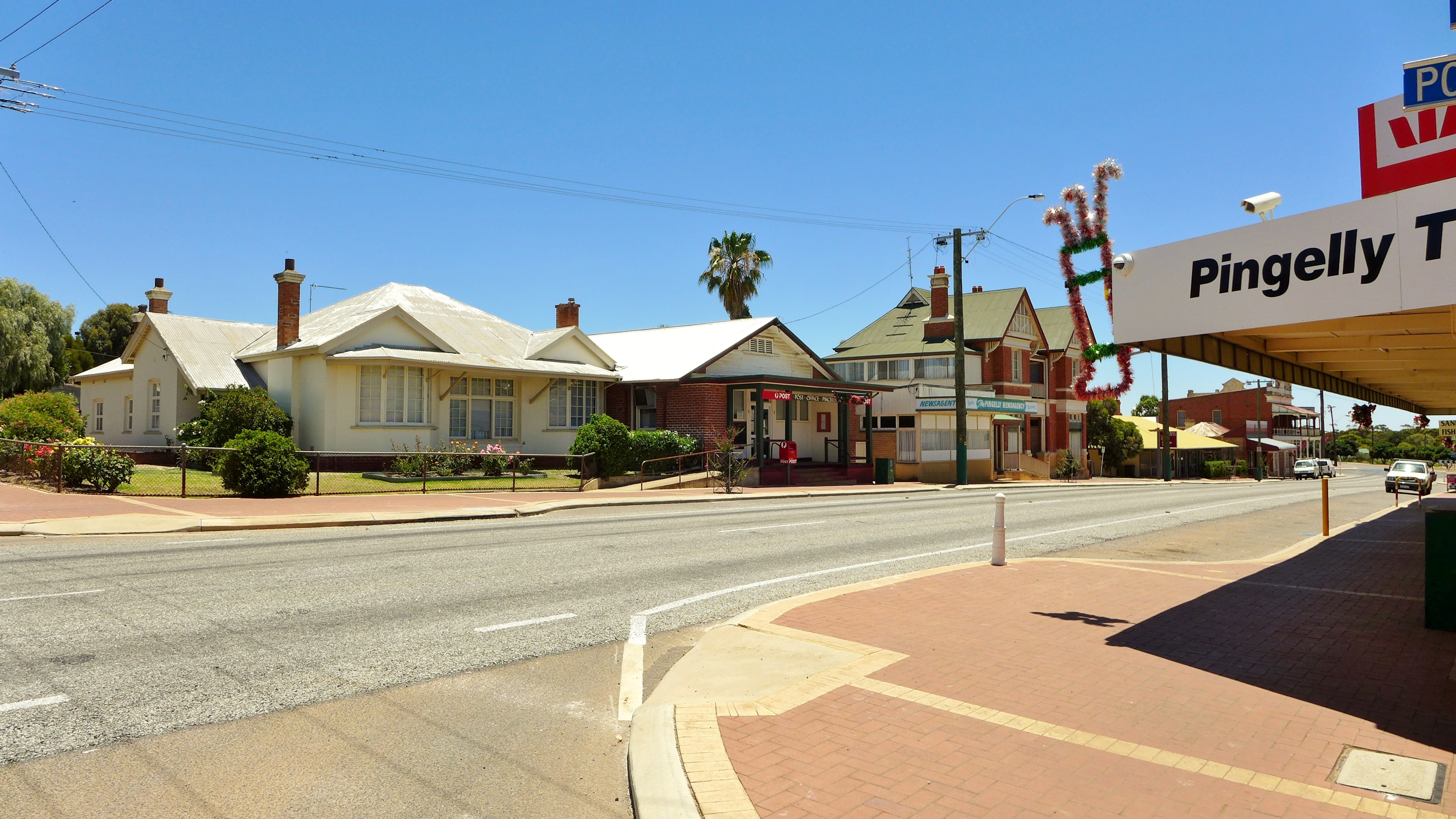
- Great Southern Highway in Pingelly in 2014

- Interactive map of Pingelly
- Coordinates: 32°32′02″S 117°05′10″E
- Country: Australia
- State: Western Australia
- LGA: Shire of Pingelly
- Location: 158 km (98 mi) from Perth

Government
  - State electorate: Central Wheatbelt
  - Federal division: O'Connor

Area
  - Total: 12.5 km^{2} (4.8 sq mi)
- Elevation: 297 m (974 ft)

Population
  - Total: 722 (SAL 2021)
- Postcode: 6308
- Mean max temp: 23.1 °C (73.6 °F)
- Mean min temp: 10.4 °C (50.7 °F)
- Annual rainfall: 448.0 mm (17.64 in)

Pingelly is a town and shire in the Wheatbelt region of Western Australia, 158 kilometres (98 mi) from Perth via the Brookton Highway and Great Southern Highway. The town is also located on the Great Southern railway line.

The surrounding areas produce wheat and other cereal crops. The town is a receival site for the CBH Group. At the 2016 census, Pingelly had a population of 809.

== History ==
The town was originally a railway siding along the Great Southern railway line, built by the Western Australian Land Company, and opened in 1889. Later the same year the company designed the town and made land available. In 1896 the Western Australian Government Railways purchased the railway and the land and gazetted the townsite in 1898. Its name is Aboriginal in origin and is the name of the Pingeculling Rocks found to the north of the town. The name was first recorded in 1873, and the original settlers referred to the area as Pingegulley for years before the town was gazetted.

In early 1898 the population of the town was 89, 52 males and 37 females, however this isn't accurate, as this does not include Aboriginal people.

Tenders for the construction of the local agricultural hall were advertised in late 1893, the contract was awarded to Thorne, Bower and Stewart in early 1894. The hall was opened in September of the same year with a tamar hunt and a ball to mark the occasion.

Between 1939 and 1941 three motor racing meetings were held annually in the town, including the Great Southern Flying 50, using a circuit which went in a clockwise direction. The last event, won by Harley Hammond in his Marquette Special was the final motor sport event held in Western Australia before racing stopped due to World War II.

== Population ==
In the 2016 Census, there were 809 people in Pingelly. Of these 50.4% were male and 49.6% were female. The median age of people in Pingelly was 52 years. Children aged 0–14 years made up 16.8% of the population and people aged 65 years and over made up 29.7% of the population. 73.5% of people were born in Australia.

== Commercial area ==
The shire includes over 1,100 residents living both in town and on rural properties, and is a key agricultural centre, with wheat, barley, sheep and cattle farming being the main activities. Pingelly contains a primary school, Bendigo Bank, shopping facilities (IGA supermarket, chemist, post office, specialty shops, arts and craft shop, hospital auxiliary op shop), accommodation (hotels, bed & breakfast, caravan park), golf course and council offices, and a Community Resource Centre is located within the town. A school bus ferries high school students to Narrogin. Each year two market days with a wide range of items are held in May and October.

The Shire of Pingelly has built a new recreation and community centre as well as new aged appropriate accommodation.

The town is a stop on Transwa Perth to Albany coach service.

The Pingelly Health Service is part of the Upper Great Southern Health Services, and includes a 24/7 medical centre facility as well as a general practitioner. Silver Chain offers home help, gardening, respite and other aged care services. Narrogin Regional Hospital remains the primary centre servicing the Upper Great Southern area.

== Climate ==
Climate data for Pingelly
Month	Jan	Feb	Mar	Apr	May	Jun	Jul	Aug	Sep	Oct	Nov	Dec	Year
Record high °C (°F)	44.4 (111.9)	46.2 (115.2)	40.5 (104.9)	36.7 (98.1)	33.3 (91.9)	24.3 (75.7)	22.8 (73.0)	26.4 (79.5)	32.9 (91.2)	37.0 (98.6)	41.2 (106.2)	43.0 (109.4)	46.2 (115.2)
Mean daily maximum °C (°F)	32.0 (89.6)	31.4 (88.5)	28.5 (83.3)	24.2 (75.6)	19.8 (67.6)	16.5 (61.7)	15.5 (59.9)	16.2 (61.2)	18.6 (65.5)	22.6 (72.7)	26.6 (79.9)	30.3 (86.5)	23.5 (74.3)
Mean daily minimum °C (°F)	15.6 (60.1)	16.0 (60.8)	14.7 (58.5)	11.8 (53.2)	8.7 (47.7)	6.5 (43.7)	5.5 (41.9)	5.7 (42.3)	6.5 (43.7)	8.5 (47.3)	11.5 (52.7)	13.9 (57.0)	10.4 (50.7)
Record low °C (°F)	6.9 (44.4)	6.4 (43.5)	3.2 (37.8)	1.3 (34.3)	0.4 (32.7)	−1.6 (29.1)	−2.5 (27.5)	−1.2 (29.8)	−1.6 (29.1)	−1.1 (30.0)	2.1 (35.8)	4.5 (40.1)	−2.5 (27.5)
Average precipitation mm (inches)	11.3 (0.44)	14.0 (0.55)	18.1 (0.71)	27.0 (1.06)	57.0 (2.24)	80.6 (3.17)	81.0 (3.19)	62.7 (2.47)	40.3 (1.59)	24.6 (0.97)	15.3 (0.60)	12.2 (0.48)	443.3 (17.45)
Average precipitation days	2.1	2.4	3.4	5.8	10.3	14.1	15.4	13.3	10.8	7.2	4.2	2.5	91.9
Average relative humidity (%)	27	29	34	43	53	61	63	59	54	42	33	27	44

== Notable people ==
- Tim English
- Leroy Jetta
- Nicky Winmar
