= Lake Yealering =

Lake in Western Australia

- Location in Western Australia
- Interactive map of Lake Yealering
- Location: Wheatbelt, Western Australia
- Coordinates: 32°35′55″S 117°37′37″E
- Type: Saline
- Primary inflows: Groundwater and surface runoff
- Catchment area: 2,700 ha (6,700 acres)
- Basin countries: Australia
- Surface area: 160 ha (400 acres)
- Average depth: 1.6 m (5 ft 3 in) (September average)
- Max. depth: 2.6 m (8 ft 6 in)

Lake Yealering, also known as Yealering Lakes, is an ephemeral salt lake in the Wheatbelt region of Western Australia located on the southern edge of the town of Yealering, 30 km (19 mi) north west of Wickepin and about 250 km (160 mi) south east of Perth.

== Description ==
The lake is situated in the Shire of Wickepin and the Shire of Corrigin, along an ancient drainage line where a paleochannel is thought to have been present. It is found in the upper reaches of the Avon River catchment. The annual rainfall in the catchment is 408 mm (16.1 in) and the annual rate of evaporation is 1,896 mm (74.6 in). The lake is part of the Lake Yealering System, which occupies an area of 775 ha (1,920 acres) and is composed of Lake Yealering (160 ha (400 acres)) and a series of adjacent shallow lakes known as the swamp (240 ha (590 acres)). Also part of the system are other ephemeral bodies of water found about 5 km (3.1 mi) north of Yealering including Brown Lake (130 ha (320 acres)), White Water Lake (140 ha (350 acres)) Nonalling Lake (25 ha (62 acres)), and other smaller lakes and swamps. Inflow to the lake is from small tributaries that discharge initially into winter-wet flats. Lake Yealering inflow is received from Wogolin and Boyning Gully located to the south east and both enter via the swamp. Once the lake fills it later backflows into the small lakes within the swamp. Stream flow from the lake discharges to Cuneenying Brook and then to the Avon River. The tributaries to Lake Yealering are recognised as headwaters of the Avon River. The lake is periodically and variably inundated and did not dry in 1982-1985 and 1989-1992. It has a maximum depth of 2.65 m (8 ft 8 in) and an average depth during September of 1.55 m (5 ft 1 in). The waters of the lake have a variable salinity with the lowest recorded reading of 430 mg/L in 1993 and the highest reading of 267 000 mg/L in 1981, with an average reading of 32 700 mg/L.

The lake and swamp wetlands are recognised for their biodiversity and are listed in the Directory of Important Wetlands in Australia.

== Flora and fauna ==
Surrounding the lake are four types of vegetation: low samphire shrubland containing Tecticornia indica and Tecticornia pergranulata, low open woodlands of Banksia prionotes with an understorey of Ehrharta calycina low shrubland and grassland, Casuarina obesa woodlands over Tecticornia indica and T. pergranulata samphire shrubland, and low open woodlands with an overstorey of Eucalyptus sargentii with an understorey dominated by Melaleuca atroviridis shrubland.

The lake and surrounds provide valuable habitat for native fauna, including western barred bandicoot, heath mouse, quenda, western brush wallaby and wambenger.

Birds found in and around the lake include black swans, Carnaby's black cockatoo, common sandpiper, great egret, rainbow bee-eater, western rosella and the peregrine falcon.

== History ==
The traditional owners of the area are the Njakinjaki group of the Noongar peoples, who have inhabited the region for tens of thousands of years. European settlers arrived when the lands around the lake were released in the 1870s. Market gardens were established by Yugoslav migrants before 1907 where the present townsite is now found. The lake was a valuable source of freshwater to the gardens and later the town.

== Facilities ==
Facilities found at the lake include parking, picnic and barbecue facilities. A variety of water sports including skiing, swimming, sailing and windsurfing are performed in the lakes waters. There are nature walks throughout the bush land that surrounds it.

== See also ==
- List of lakes of Australia § Western Australia
