= Conospermum stoechadis subsp. sclerophyllum =

Scientific classification
- Kingdom: Plantae
- Clade: Tracheophytes
- Clade: Angiosperms
- Clade: Eudicots
- Order: Proteales
- Family: Proteaceae
- Genus: Conospermum
- Species: C. stoechadis
- Subspecies: C. s. subsp. sclerophyllum

Trinomial name
- Conospermum stoechadis subsp. sclerophyllum (Lindl.) E.M.Benn.

Subspecies of flowering plant

Conospermum stoechadis subsp. sclerophyllum is a shrub endemic to Western Australia.

== Description ==
As with other forms of C. stoechadis, it grows as an erect, multi-stemmed shrub, with a lignotuber. It has slender needle-like leaves from two to 17 centimetres long and 0.6 to 2.25 millimetres wide, and panicles of white flowers. This subspecies grows to a height of from 0.3 to 1.5 metres, rarely to 2.5 metres, and has tomentose, grey leaves.

== Taxonomy ==
It was first published at species rank as Conospermum sclerophyllum, in John Lindley's 1839 A Sketch of the Vegetation of the Swan River Colony, based on unspecified material. In 1995, Eleanor Bennett demoted it to a subspecies of C. stoechadis in her treatment of Conospermum for the Flora of Australia series of monographs.

== Distribution and habitat ==
It occurs on sandplains of white, grey or yellow sand, or amongst laterite. It extends from Jurien Bay, east to Kulin, and south as far as Wickepin.

== Ecology ==
It is not considered threatened.
