= Calytrix habrantha =

Scientific classification
- Kingdom: Plantae
- Clade: Tracheophytes
- Clade: Angiosperms
- Clade: Eudicots
- Clade: Rosids
- Order: Myrtales
- Family: Myrtaceae
- Genus: Calytrix
- Species: C. habrantha

Binomial name
- Calytrix habrantha Craven

Species of flowering plant

Calytrix habrantha is a species of flowering plant in the myrtle family Myrtaceae and is endemic to Western Australia. It is a glabrous shrub with linear leaves and magenta to rich pink flowers with about 25 to 35 stamens in several rows.

== Description ==
Calytrix habrantha is a glabrous shrub that typically grows to a height of up to 50 cm (20 in). Its leaves are linear, 4–12 mm (0.16–0.47 in) long, 0.3–0.8 mm (0.012–0.031 in) wide on a petiole 0.5–1 mm (0.020–0.039 in) long. There is a stipule up to 0.5 mm (0.020 in) long at the base of the petiole. The flowers are borne on a peduncle 0.6–1.5 mm (0.024–0.059 in) long with elliptic to more or less round lobes, 1.2–2.0 mm (0.047–0.079 in) long but that fall off as the flowers open. The floral tube is fused to the style, 5.5–8 mm (0.22–0.31 in) and has 10 ribs. The sepals are fused at the base, with more or less round lobes 0.75–1.2 mm (0.030–0.047 in) long and 0.75–1.4 mm (0.030–0.055 in) long, with an awn up to 6.5 mm (0.26 in) long. The petals are magenta to rich pink, lance-shaped to elliptic, 5–6 mm (0.20–0.24 in) long and 2.0–3.25 mm (0.079–0.128 in) wide, and there are about 25 to 35 stamens in several rows. Flowering occurs from November to December or January.

== Taxonomy ==
Calytrix habrantha was first formally described in 1987 by Lyndley Craven in the journal Brunonia from specimens collected in Frank Hann National Park in 1971. The specific epithet (habrantha) means 'dainty-' or 'pretty-flowered.

== Distribution and habitat ==
This species of Calytrix grows in low shrubland, closed heath or open shrubland in the Mogumber district and from the Kulin-Harrismith district to near Salmon Gums in the Avon Wheatbelt, Coolgardie, Jarrah Forest and Mallee bioregions of Western Australia.
