= Albert Facey =

Australian writer and World War I veteran (1894–1982)

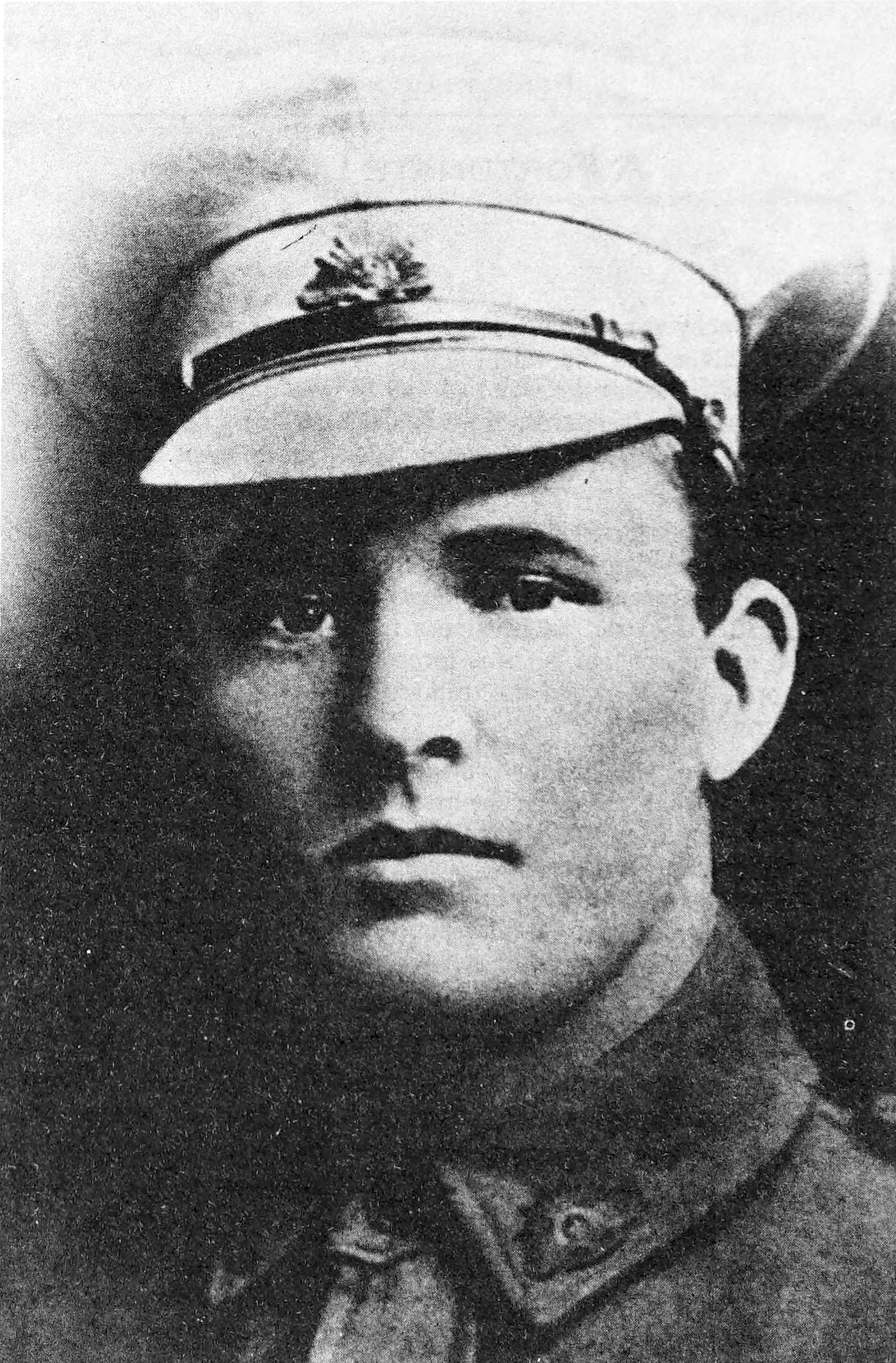
- Facey in 1914
- Born: Albert Barnett Facey; 31 August 1894; Maidstone, Victoria
- Died: 11 February 1982 (aged 87); Midland, Western Australia
- Occupation: Writer
- Years active: 1902–1958
- Known for: A Fortunate Life
- Spouse: Evelyn Mary Gibson (m. 1916; died 1976)
- Children: 7

Albert Barnett Facey (31 August 1894 – 11 February 1982), publishing as A. B. Facey, was an Australian writer and World War I veteran, whose main work was his autobiography, A Fortunate Life, now considered a classic of Australian literature. As of 2020, it has sold over one million copies and was the subject of a television mini-series.

== Early life ==
Facey was born in Maidstone, Victoria, the son of Joseph Facey and Mary Ann Facey, née Carr. In 1896, when Albert was two years old, his father died of typhoid fever on the Kalgoorlie goldfields in Western Australia. In 1898, Albert's mother left for Western Australia to care for her older children, who had accompanied their father to the goldfields, leaving her younger children, including Albert, in the care of their grandmother. His grandfather died in 1898 and, a year later, the grandmother, Jane Carr (née Barnett), moved from Barkers Creek near Castlemaine, Victoria, to Kalgoorlie, with Albert and his siblings, Roy (born 1890), Eric (born 1889) and Myra (born 1892). Facey began his working life around 1902, aged eight, and hardly ever lived with his family again. He was never able to attend school, but managed to teach himself to read and write when he was in his teens.

On his first job as a farm boy, his employer subjected Facey to virtual slavery and violent beatings with a horse whip. After sustaining months of such abuse, Albert escaped by walking over 20 kilometres (12 mi) through the bush, luckily finding the camp of some new settlers. Although the police were informed of the abuse, his employer was never prosecuted. The scars on his back and neck from the injuries Facey had sustained remained evident for the rest of his life.

In 1908, Facey's mother remarried and, at her request, he moved to Subiaco, a suburb of Perth, to live with her and her second husband, a plumber named Arthur "Bill" Downie. However, he only stayed a short time before accepting work back in rural Western Australia. Thereafter, Facey and his mother saw each other sporadically until she died suddenly in September 1914, aged 51. His childhood in Western Australia was spent in areas such as Kalgoorlie, Narrogin, Bruce Rock, Merredin, Yealering, Wickepin, Pingelly, and at Cave Rock, near Popanyinning, which he writes about in chapter 2 of A Fortunate Life.

By the age of 14, he was an experienced farm labourer and bushman and, at 20, he became a professional boxer with a troupe that toured South Australia, Victoria and New South Wales. His boxing career continued until he enlisted in the Australian Imperial Force (AIF) in January 1915.

== War service ==
Facey joined the AIF on 4 January 1915, not long after the outbreak of World War I. He travelled to Egypt as an infantryman with the 11th Battalion, 3rd Reinforcement, aboard the troopship HMAT Itonus and fought during the Gallipoli Campaign, including the battle of Leane's Trench. Much of his autobiography relates to the horror he endured during his wartime service and his vivid recollections of the plight of the ANZAC diggers at Gallipoli. Two of his older brothers, Roy Barker Facey (1890–1915) and Joseph Thomas Facey (1883–1915) were killed during the campaign.

In his book, Facey tells of being wounded on more than one occasion at Gallipoli. On 19 August 1915 – although Facey "was uncertain about dates" – that culminated in a shell exploding near him, from which he received severe internal injuries and wounds to his leg. However, his war records show no evidence of being wounded, only of heart trouble. The records make no mention of any ordnance exploding near any 11th Battalion troops on (or about) 19 August. After a week in reserve, the 11th Battalion was redistributed between the 9th and 10th Battalions at Anzac on 18 August.

Facey was invalided back to Australia on the ship HMAT Aeneas, which left Port Suez on 31 October 1915.

== Family life and career ==
=== Marriage ===
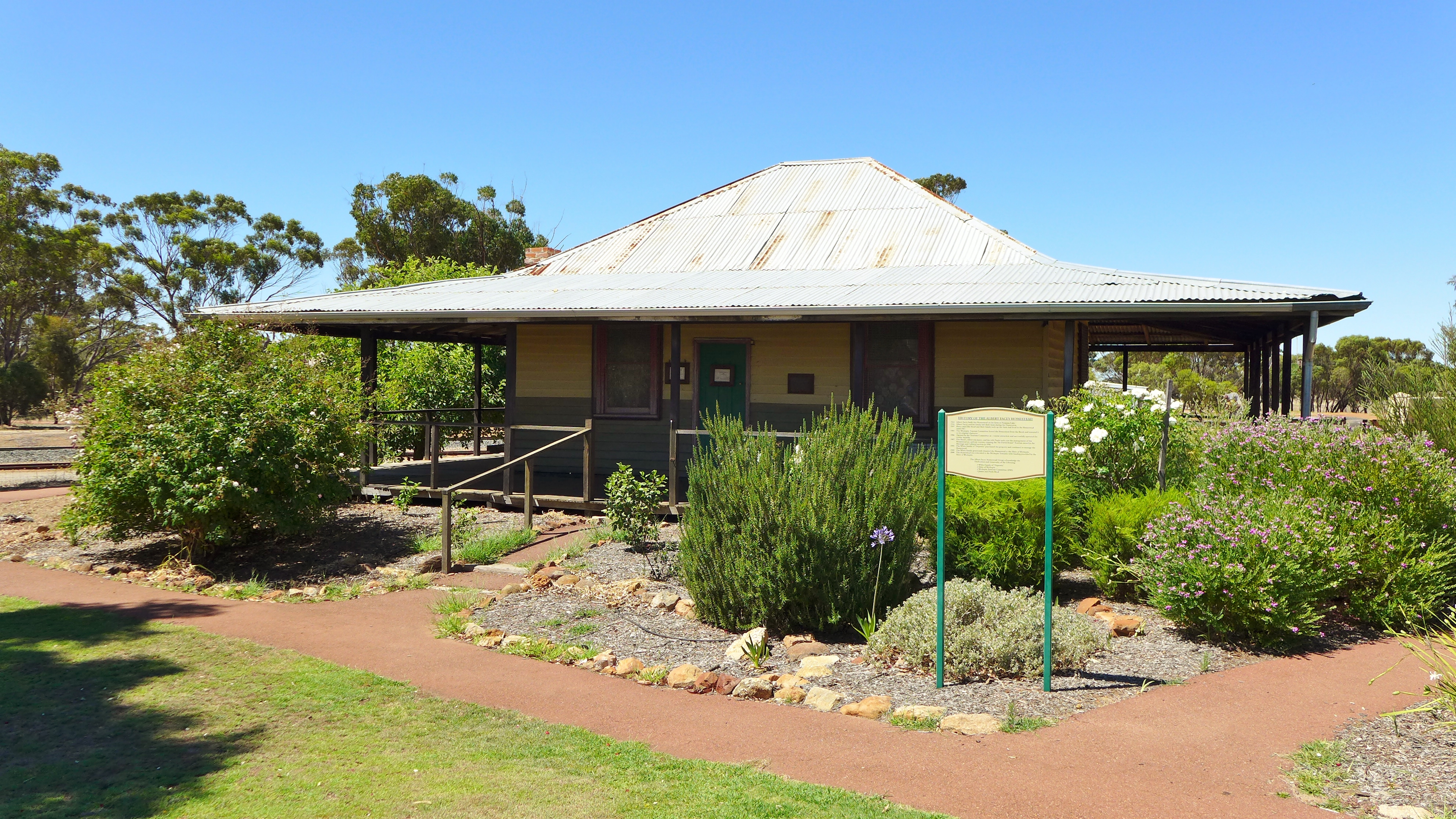
Albert Facey's house in Wickepin was moved into town and is now a tourist attraction

After being returned to Australia, Facey met Evelyn Mary Gibson (1897–1976), whom he married at Bunbury on 24 August 1916. They were happily married for nearly 60 years before Evelyn died on 3 August 1976. He mourned her for the rest of his life. The couple had seven children, born between 1919 and 1939.

After he returned from the war, Facey worked as a tram driver (1916–1922). He became an active campaigner for improved conditions for Australian returned servicemen. The family lived at Victoria Park, before returning with their children to farm at Wickepin, from 1922 to 1934. After his time at Wickepin, Facey returned to Perth and worked as a trolleybus driver (1934–1946). He spent the rest of his working life as a successful, self-employed poultry and pig farmer and businessman (1947–1958) in areas such as Tuart Hill, Wanneroo, Gosnells and Mount Helena near Mundaring.

Facey was active in public life and was well-known in his community from the 1920s until he retired in the late 1950s. He was president of the Perth Tramways Union for five years and later an elected member of local government and the Perth Roads Board for over 20 years, and a justice of the peace.

=== Loss of son ===
Facey's eldest son, also named Albert Barnett Facey, but known as Barney, 1919–1942, joined the Second AIF during the Second World War and served with the 2/4th Machine Gun Battalion. On 15 March 1942, he died in a bombing raid during the Battle of Singapore against the Japanese Army. While his family were aware that he was missing in action, his death was not confirmed until May 1945. Facey stated in his memoirs that, although he and his wife had assumed their son had been killed, they had not given up hope. After that wait of over three years, his wife's health deteriorated to such an extent that she suffered a major stroke. Two other sons, Joseph and George, also served in the Australian Army in World War II, both seeing action in New Guinea. They returned home safely at the end of 1945.

=== Later health ===
Facey attributed his later health problems to war injuries received at Gallipoli, including old bullet wounds and a ruptured spleen, even though his war records contain no evidence of his being injured during his war service. He arrived at Gallipoli on 7 May 1915, after which the only problem with his health was "heart trouble" (tachycardia), diagnosed at Gallipoli on 19 August, which was the reason for his repatriation to Australia in October 1915. He did not re-enlist.

Facey suffered a major heart attack in 1958 (aged 64), and retired.

=== Memoirs and fame ===
Facey began making notes on his life and, at the urging of his wife and children, eventually had the notes compiled into a book. He completed his memoirs in 1977, on his 83rd birthday. Two years later, at 85, he learnt that his autobiography, A Fortunate Life, had been approved for publication. It was published in 1981, just nine months before his death.

Although Facey was delighted that his life story was appreciated on such a grand scale, his health was rapidly declining and he was losing his eyesight. He also needed a wheelchair due to a broken hip. His book became a best-seller, and won New South Wales Premier's Literary Award for non-fiction, as well as the National Book Council Prize. During the final six months of his life, Facey became a national celebrity and was nominated for the Australian of the Year award in 1981.

== Death ==
While in an aged care facility at Midland due to his broken hip, Facey died of natural causes on 11 February 1982, aged 87.

== Television adaptation ==
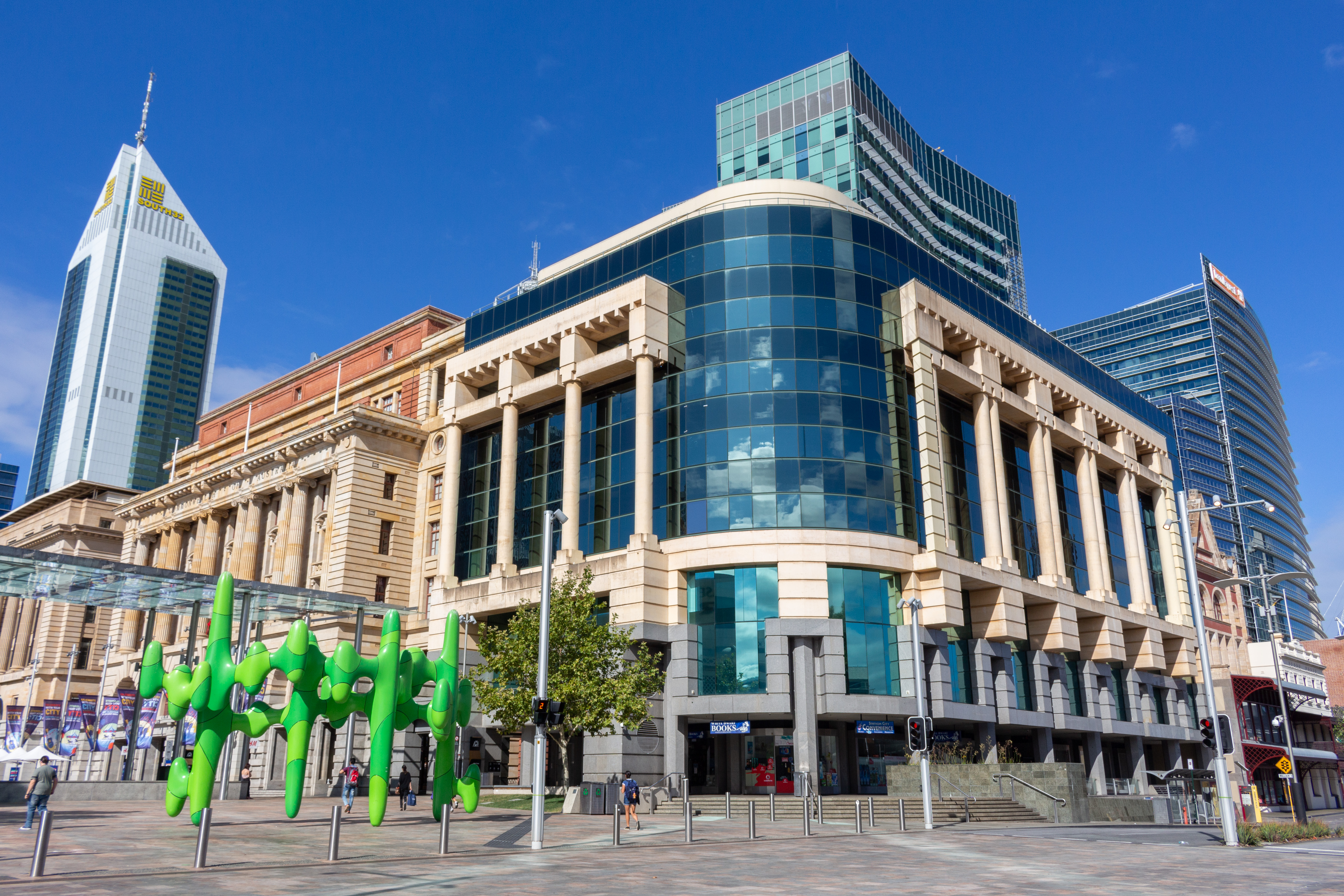
Albert Facey House in Forrest Place, Perth is named after Facey

His novel A Fortunate Life was made into a four-part television film in 1985, based on Facey's life between 1897 and 1916. The cast included Bill Hunter, Val Lehman and Ray Meagher.

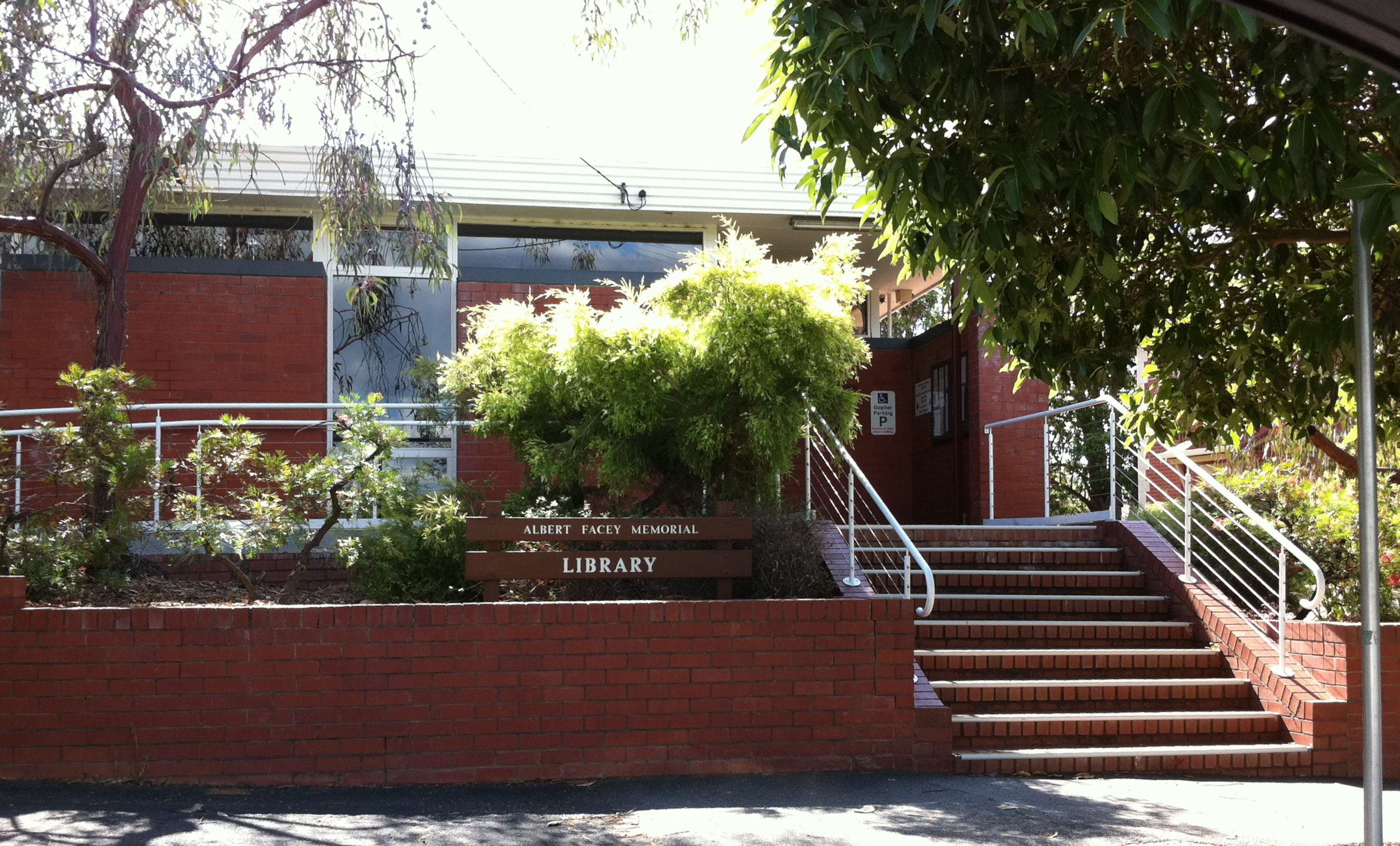
The Albert Facey Memorial Library in Mundaring

== Legacy ==
Facey's homestead in Wickepin has been turned into a tourist attraction. A government building, Albert Facey House, on Forrest Place in Perth, was named in his honour. It houses the Public Utilities Office of the Department of Finance, as well as other agencies. His name is also borne by the Albert Facey Memorial Library in Mundaring, Facey Road in Gnangara, Albert Facey Street in Maidstone, and a motel in Narrogin. Barney Street in Glendalough is named after his late son. The manuscripts of A Fortunate Life are housed in the Special Collections of the University of Western Australia Library.
