= Conospermum multispicatum =

Scientific classification
- Kingdom: Plantae
- Clade: Embryophytes
- Clade: Tracheophytes
- Clade: Spermatophytes
- Clade: Angiosperms
- Clade: Eudicots
- Order: Proteales
- Family: Proteaceae
- Genus: Conospermum
- Species: C. multispicatum

Binomial name
- Conospermum multispicatum E.M.Benn.

Species of shrub native to Australia

Conospermum multispicatum is a species of flowering plant of the family Proteaceae and is endemic to the south-west of Western Australia. It is a dense, rounded shrub with glabrous leaves that are round in cross section, spikes of woolly hairy, white flowers and woolly hairy nuts.

== Description ==
Conospermum multispicatum is a dense, rounded shrub that typically grows to a height of up to 1 m (3 ft 3 in). Its leaves are glabrous, round or four-angled in cross section, 9–25 mm (0.35–0.98 in) long and 0.5–0.75 mm (0.020–0.030 in) wide, with a raised midvein on the lower surface. The flowers are arranged in spikes of up to 12 in upper leaf axils on a peduncle 10–20 mm (0.39–0.79 in) long with densely hairy, woolly white bracteoles 1.5–2.0 mm (0.059–0.079 in) long and 1.25–2 mm (0.049–0.079 in) wide. The perianth is white and densely covered with woolly hairs, and forms a tube 4.5–5.5 mm (0.18–0.22 in) long. The upper lip is 0.7–1.25 mm (0.028–0.049 in) long and densely covered with woolly white hairs, the lower lip joined for 0.5–0.8 mm (0.020–0.031 in) with oblong lobes 0.5–0.6 mm (0.020–0.024 in) long and 0.25–0.4 mm (0.0098–0.0157 in) wide. Flowering occurs from August to October, and the fruit is a hairy nut 2.0–2.4 mm (0.079–0.094 in) long and 2.0–2.5 mm (0.079–0.098 in) wide covered with golden-fawn, woolly hairs.

== Taxonomy ==
Conospermum multispicatum was first formally described in 1995 by Eleanor Marion Bennett in the Flora of Australia, from specimens she collected near the Toolibin – Tincurrin road in 1985. The specific epithet (multispicatum) means 'many spikes'.

== Distribution and habitat ==
This species of Conospermum is found on gentle slopes and flats along the west coast in the Avon Wheatbelt and Jarrah Forest bioregions of Western Australia where it grows in sandy or clay soils. It has been recorded from near Toolibin, Woodanilling, Wagin and the Stirling Ranges.
