= Grevillea incurva =

Conservation status
- Critically Endangered (IUCN 3.1)

Scientific classification
- Kingdom: Plantae
- Clade: Embryophytes
- Clade: Tracheophytes
- Clade: Angiosperms
- Clade: Eudicots
- Order: Proteales
- Family: Proteaceae
- Genus: Grevillea
- Species: G. incurva

Binomial name
- Grevillea incurva (Diels) Olde & Marriott

Species of shrub endemic to Western Australia

Grevillea incurva is a species of flowering plant in the family Proteaceae and is endemic to inland south-western Western Australia. It is an erect shrub with linear adult leaves and clusters of creamy-yellow flowers.

== Description ==
Grevillea incurva is an erect shrub that typically grows to a height of 1.5–2.5 m (4 ft 11 in – 8 ft 2 in) and has silky-hairy branchlets. Its adult leaves are linear mostly 10–20 mm (0.39–0.79 in) long and 0.7–1 mm (0.028–0.039 in) long with the edges curved upwards. The flowers are arranged in leaf axils or on the ends of branches in cylindrical clusters 24–45 mm (0.94–1.77 in) long and are creamy-yellow, the pistil 5.5–6.0 mm (0.22–0.24 in) long. Flowering occurs in late spring and the fruit is a smooth oval follicle 7.5–10 mm (0.30–0.39 in) long.

== Taxonomy ==
This grevillea was first formally described in 1904 by Ludwig Diels who gave it the name Grevillea integrifolia var. incurva in Ernst Georg Pritzel's Botanische Jahrbücher für Systematik, Pflanzengeschichte und Pflanzengeographie. In 1994 Peter M. Olde and Neil R. Marriott raised the variety to species status as Grevillea incurva in The Grevillea Book. The specific epithet (incurva) means "curved upwards", referring to the leaves.

== Distribution and habitat ==
Grevillea incurva grows on sandy soil in heath between Meckering, Kellerberrin and Harrismith in the Avon Wheatbelt bioregion of inland south-western Western Australia.

== Conservation status ==
Grevillea incurva is listed as Critically Endangered by the International Union for Conservation of Nature, but as 'Not Threatened' by the Government of Western Australia Department of Biodiversity, Conservation and Attractions.

== See also ==
- List of Grevillea species
