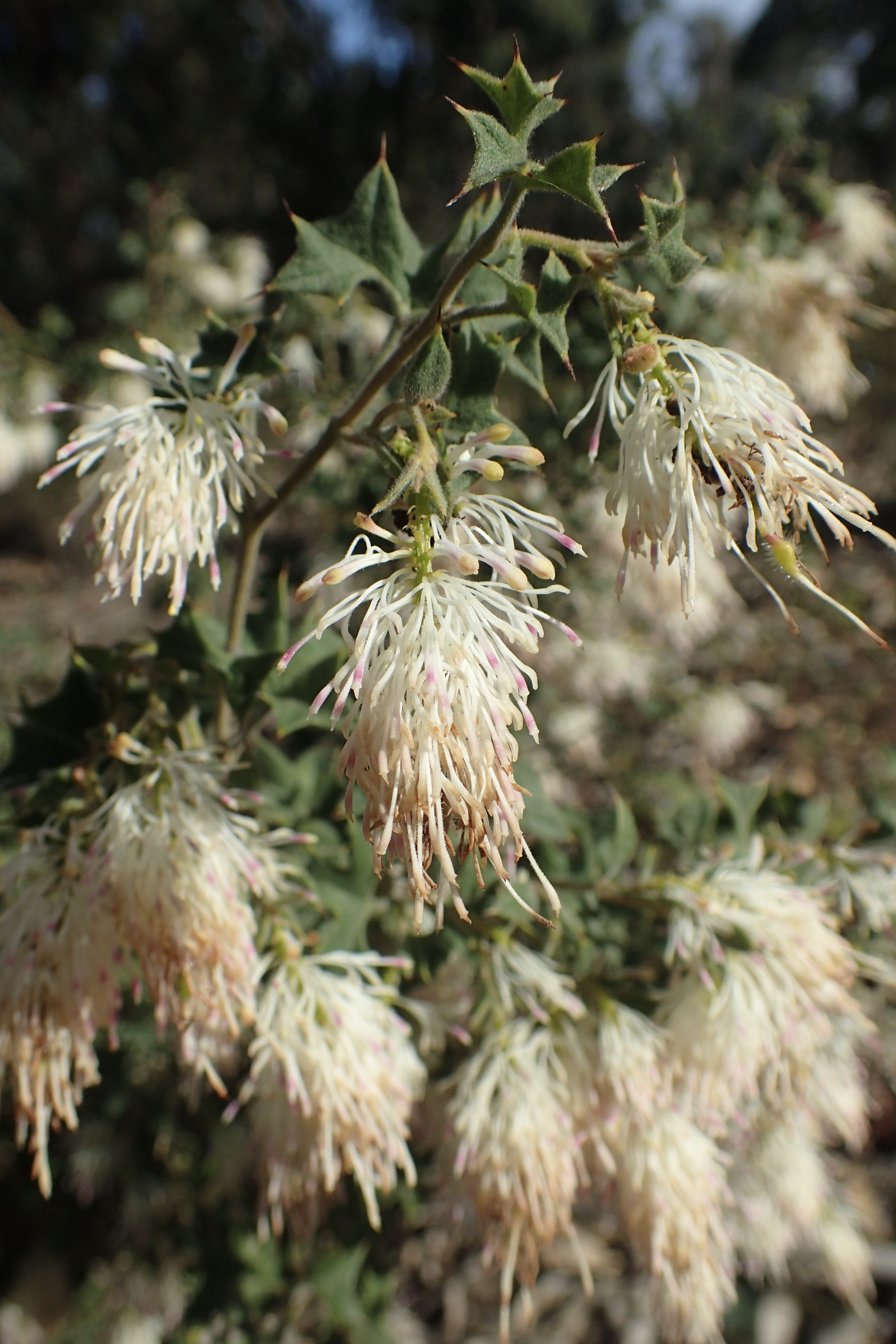

Scientific classification
- Kingdom: Plantae
- Clade: Tracheophytes
- Clade: Angiosperms
- Clade: Eudicots
- Order: Proteales
- Family: Proteaceae
- Genus: Grevillea
- Species: G. tenuiflora

Binomial name
- Grevillea tenuiflora (Lindl.) Meisn.

Synonyms
- Anadenia tenuiflora Lindl.

= Grevillea tenuiflora =

Species of shrub endemic to Western Australia

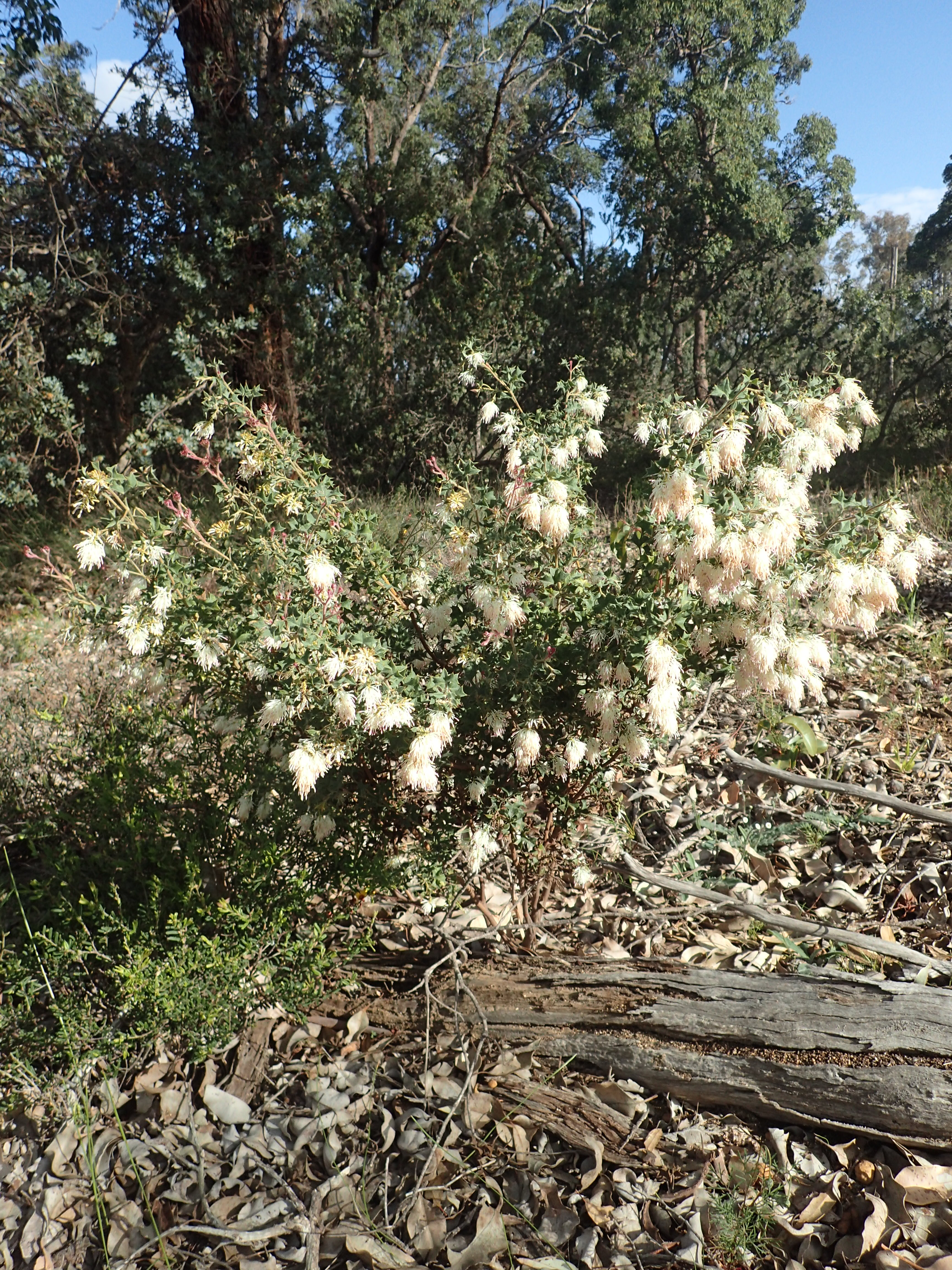
Habit in the Foxes Lair Nature Reserve, Narrogin

Grevillea tenuiflora, commonly known as tassel grevillea, is species of flowering plant in the family Proteaceae and is endemic to the southwest of Western Australia. It is a spreading to weakly erect shrub with divided leaves, the end lobes more or less triangular and sharply pointed, and clusters of whitish and violet-tinged flowers.

== Description ==
Grevillea tenuiflora is a spreading to weakly erect shrub that typically grows to a height of 0.5–1.5 m (1 ft 8 in – 4 ft 11 in). The leaves are pinnatisect to pinnatifid, 17–60 mm (0.67–2.36 in) long with 5 to 7 lobes, usually divided again, the end lobes more or less triangular, 3–10 mm (0.12–0.39 in) long, 3–6 mm (0.12–0.24 in) wide and sharply pointed. The flowers are arranged in leaf axils or on the ends of branches, in sometimes branched clusters, each branch usually down-curved, more or less cylindrical or oval, 15–30 mm (0.59–1.18 in) long and 10–20 mm (0.39–0.79 in) wide. The flowers are whitish and tinged with violet, the pistil 7–11 mm (0.28–0.43 in) long. Flowering mostly occurs in August and September, and the fruit is a sticky, oval follicle 9–11 mm (0.35–0.43 in) long.

== Taxonomy ==
This species was first formally described in 1839 by John Lindley who gave it the name Anadenia tenuiflora in A Sketch of the Vegetation of the Swan River Colony. In 1845, Carl Meissner transferred it to Grevillea as G. tenuifora in Lehmann's Plantae Preissianae. The specific epithet (tenuiflora) means "thinly or delicately flowered".

== Distribution and habitat ==
Tassel grevillea grows in heath, shrubland or woodland between York, Armadale and Wagin in the Avon Wheatbelt, Jarrah Forest and Swan Coastal Plain bioregions of south-western Western Australia. It grows in gravelly, sand or clay soils over laterite.

== Conservation status ==
Grevillea tenuiflora is listed as "not threatened" by the Government of Western Australia Department of Biodiversity, Conservation and Attractions.

== See also ==
- List of Grevillea species
