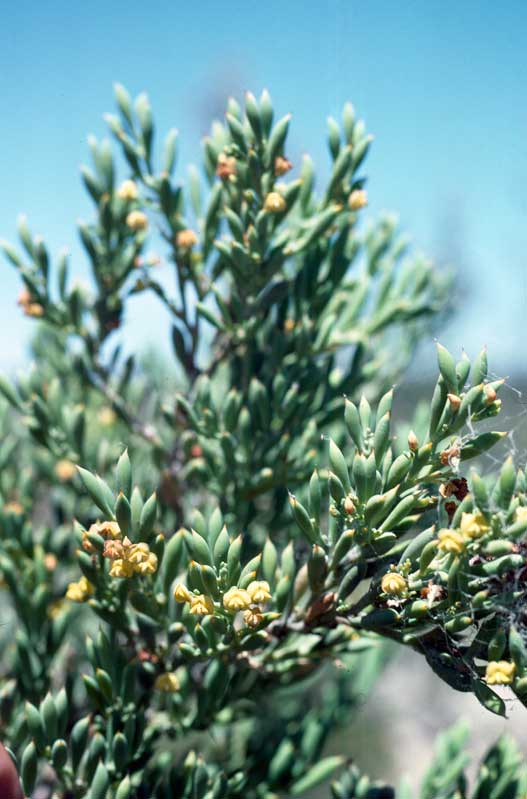
- Near Harrismith

Conservation status
- Priority Four — Rare Taxa (DEC)

Scientific classification
- Kingdom: Plantae
- Clade: Tracheophytes
- Clade: Angiosperms
- Clade: Eudicots
- Clade: Rosids
- Order: Fabales
- Family: Fabaceae
- Subfamily: Faboideae
- Genus: Daviesia
- Species: D. crassa

Binomial name
- Daviesia crassa Crisp

= Daviesia crassa =

Species of flowering plant

Daviesia crassa is a species of flowering plant in the family Fabaceae and is endemic to the south-west of Western Australia. It is a compact, dense, glabrous shrub with densely crowded, thick, club-shaped phyllodes, and uniformly yellow flowers.

== Description ==
Daviesia crassa is a compact, dense, glabrous shrub that typically grows to a height of 1.8 m (5 ft 11 in) and has spreading to erect and often zig-zagging branchlets. Its leaves are reduced to crowded, thick, club-shaped phyllodes mostly 10–40 mm (0.39–1.57 in) long and 2–6 mm (0.079–0.236 in) wide. The flowers are mostly arranged in groups of three to five in leaf axils on a peduncle 3.5–6.0 mm (0.14–0.24 in) long, each flower on a pedicel 2–4 mm (0.079–0.157 in) long with egg-shaped bracts 0.5–1 mm (0.020–0.039 in) long at the base. The sepals are 4–5 mm (0.16–0.20 in) long and joined at the base, forming a bell-shaped base, the two upper lobes joined for most of their length and the lower three minute. The flowers are uniformly yellow, the standard broadly egg-shaped, 4.0–4.5 mm (0.16–0.18 in) long and 5.5–6 mm (0.22–0.24 in) wide, the wings spatula-shaped and about 4.5 mm (0.18 in) long and the keel about 4.5 mm (0.18 in) long. Flowering has been observed in January and the fruit is a flattened, triangular pod about 20 mm (0.79 in) long.

== Taxonomy and naming ==
Daviesia crassa was first formally described in 1995 by Michael Crisp in Australian Systematic Botany from specimens he collected near Harrismith in 1979. The specific epithet (crassa) means "thick", referring to the phyllodes.

== Distribution and habitat ==
This species of pea grows in kwongan heath between Wagin and Harrismith in the Avon Wheatbelt biogeographic region of south-western Western Australia.

== Conservation status ==
Daviesia crassa is classified as "Priority Four" by the Government of Western Australia Department of Biodiversity, Conservation and Attractions, meaning that is rare or near threatened.
