= Thysanotus rectantherus =

Scientific classification
- Kingdom: Plantae
- Clade: Tracheophytes
- Clade: Angiosperms
- Clade: Monocots
- Order: Asparagales
- Family: Asparagaceae
- Subfamily: Lomandroideae
- Genus: Thysanotus
- Species: T. rectantherus

Binomial name
- Thysanotus rectantherus N.H.Brittan

Species of plant

Thysanotus rectantherus is a species of flowering plant in the Asparagaceae family, and is endemic to the south-west of Western Australia. It is a perennial herb with a short rootstock, tuberous roots, two or three annual leaves and panicles of flowers with linear to narrowly lance-shaped sepals, elliptic, fringed petals and six stamens of similar lengths.

== Description ==
Thysanotus rectantherus is a perennial herb with a short rootstock, tuberous roots, the tubers 30–50 mm (1.2–2.0 in) long and about 60 mm (2.4 in) from the rootstock. There are two or three occasionally erect, more or less linear annual leaves developing at about 45° to the ground surface. The flowers are borne in panicles 140–170 mm (5.5–6.7 in) long with umbels of one or two flowers, each on a pedicel 9 mm (0.35 in) long. The perianth segments are 11 mm (0.43 in) long, the sepals linear to narrowly lance-shaped, about 2.5 mm (0.098 in) wide, and the petals elliptic, 5 mm (0.20 in) wide, with a fringe 0.5–4 mm (0.020–0.157 in) long. There are six stamens, the anthers 5.5–6.0 mm (0.22–0.24 in) long, and the style is about 6 mm (0.24 in) long. Flowering occurs from September to November, and the seeds are cylindrical, about 2.0 mm (0.079 in) long and 1.0 mm (0.039 in) in diameter, with a pale yellow aril.

== Taxonomy ==
Thysanotus rectantherus was first formally described in 1960 by Norman Henry Brittan in the Journal of the Royal Society of Western Australia from specimens he collected "15 mi (24 km) south of Kulin" in 1954. The specific epithet (rectantherus) means 'upright anthers'.

== Distribution and habitat ==
This species of Thysanotus grows in sand and sandy loam on sandplains, with shrubby species of Casuarina, from near Sandstone and Wiluna to the Pingelly-Wickepin area, and the Southern Cross area, in the Avon Wheatbelt, Coolgardie, Geraldton Sandplains, Mallee and Yalgoo bioregions of south-western Western Australia.

== Conservation status ==
Thysanotus rectantherus is listed as "not threatened" by the Government of Western Australia Department of Biodiversity, Conservation and Attractions.
