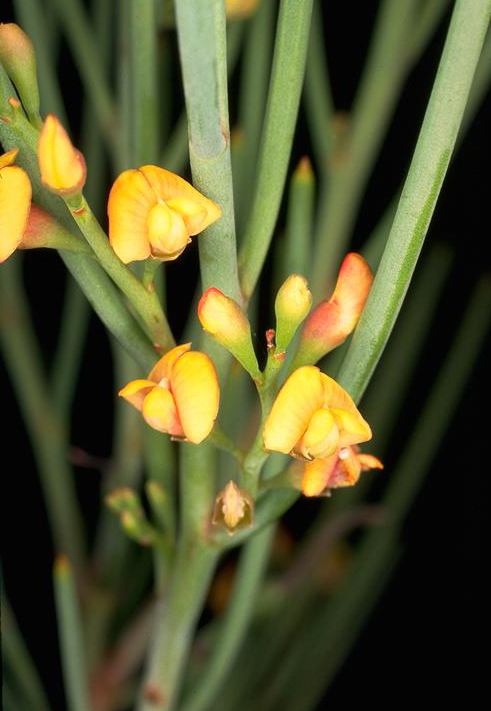
- In the Australian National Botanic Gardens

Scientific classification
- Kingdom: Plantae
- Clade: Tracheophytes
- Clade: Angiosperms
- Clade: Eudicots
- Clade: Rosids
- Order: Fabales
- Family: Fabaceae
- Subfamily: Faboideae
- Genus: Daviesia
- Species: D. apiculata

Binomial name
- Daviesia apiculata Crisp

= Daviesia apiculata =

Species of flowering plant

Daviesia apiculata is a species of flowering plant in the family Fabaceae and is endemic to the south-west of Western Australia. It is an erect, bushy shrub with scattered, erect phyllodes with a point on the end, and yellow flowers with a red tinge.

== Description ==
Daviesia apiculata is an erect, bushy, glabrous shrub that typically grows to a height of 0.4–1.5 m (1 ft 4 in – 4 ft 11 in). Its leaves are reduced to erect, cylindrical phyllodes 25–60 mm (0.98–2.36 in) wide and about 1.5 mm (0.059 in) wide with a more or less sharply-pointed tip. The flowers are yellow with a red tinge, arranged in groups of four to six in leaf axils on a peduncle 1–3 mm (0.039–0.118 in) long, each flower on a pedicel 1–2 mm (0.039–0.079 in) long with oblong bracts at the base. The sepals are 3.0–3.5 mm (0.12–0.14 in) long, the two lobes about 0.5 mm (0.020 in) long and joined in a broad "lip" and the lower three smaller and triangular. The standard petal is elliptic with a notched tip, 4.0–4.5 mm (0.16–0.18 in) long, the wings oblong and about 4.5 mm (0.18 in) long and the keel 4.0–4.5 mm (0.16–0.18 in) long. Flowering mainly occurs from November to May and the fruit is a triangular pod 14–15 mm (0.55–0.59 in) long.

== Taxonomy and naming ==
Daviesia apiculata was first formally described in 1995 by Michael Crisp in Australian Systematic Botany from specimens he collected near Israelite Bay in 1979. The specific epithet (apiculata) means "ending abruptly in a small point", referring to the leaves.

== Distribution and habitat ==
This species of pea mainly grows in kwongan in two disjunct populations; one between Narembeen, Wickepin, Lake Grace and Hyden, the other between Salmon Gums, Esperance and Israelite Bay.

== Conservation status ==
Daviesia apiculata is classified as "not threatened" by the Government of Western Australia Department of Biodiversity, Conservation and Attractions.
