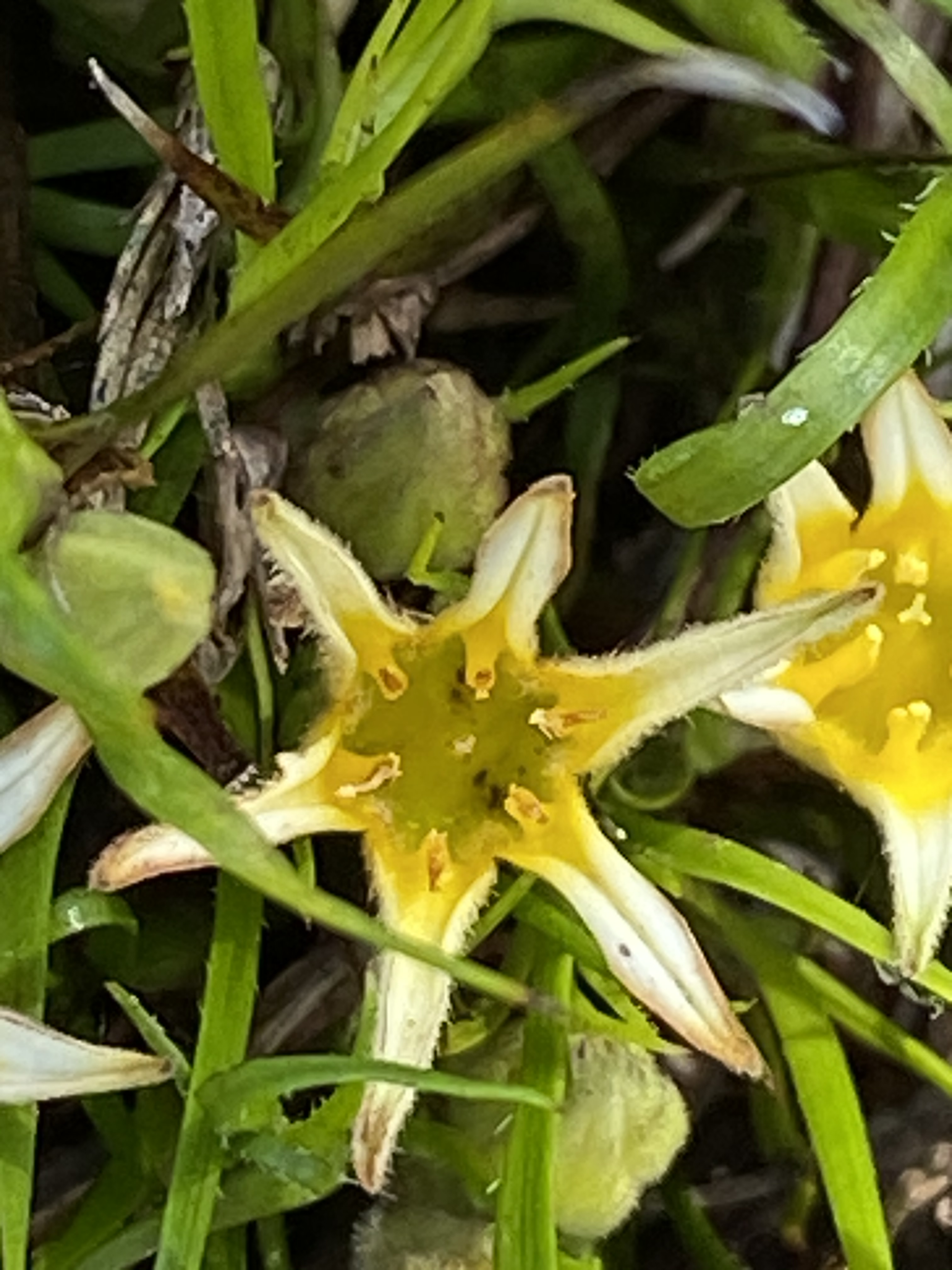
- In the Australian National Botanic Gardens

Scientific classification
- Kingdom: Plantae
- Clade: Tracheophytes
- Clade: Angiosperms
- Clade: Monocots
- Clade: Commelinids
- Order: Commelinales
- Family: Haemodoraceae
- Genus: Conostylis
- Species: C. seorsiflora

Binomial name
- Conostylis seorsiflora F.Muell.

= Conostylis seorsiflora =

Species of flowering plant

Conostylis seorsiflora is a rhizomatous, tufted perennial, grass-like plant or herb in the family Haemodoraceae and is endemic to the south of Western Australia. It has flat leaves and yellow, tubular flowers.

== Description ==
Conostylis seorsiflora is a rhizomatous, tufted, perennial grass-like plant or herb that forms prostrate mats 30–40 cm (12–16 in) in diameter, individual plants connected by stolons. It has flat leaves 20–160 mm (0.79–6.30 in) long, 0.6–1.6 mm (0.024–0.063 in) wide and glabrous. The flowers are 12–15 mm (0.47–0.59 in) long and borne singly on a flowering stem 1–5.2 mm (0.039–0.205 in) long, the flowers yellow with lobes 8.0–10.5 mm (0.31–0.41 in) long. The anthers are 4.0–5.5 mm (0.16–0.22 in) long and the style is 7.5–10.5 mm (0.30–0.41 in) long. Flowering occurs from September to December.

== Taxonomy and naming ==
Conostylis seorsiflora was first formally described in 1859 by Ferdinand von Mueller in his Fragmenta phytographiae Australiae, from specimens collected by George Maxwell near the Gardiner River. The specific epithet (seorsiflora) means "separate-flowered".

In 1987, Stephen Hopper described 3 subspecies of C. seorsifolia in the Flora of Australia and the names are accepted by the Australian Plant Census:

- Conostylis seorsiflora subsp. longissima Hopper has glabrous leaves that are 80–160 mm (3.1–6.3 in) long and pedicels 2–12 mm (0.079–0.472 in) long.
- Conostylis seorsiflora F.Muell. subsp. seorsiflora has glabrous leaves that are 20–90 mm (0.79–3.54 in) long and pedicels 1.0–4.5 mm (0.039–0.177 in) long.
- Conostylis seorsiflora subsp. trichophylla Hopper has woolly-hairy, silvery-grey leaves.

== Distribution and habitat ==
This species of conostylis grows in winter-wet flats in heath and mallee near the south coast of Western Australia between Mount Barker and the Stirling Range in the Avon Wheatbelt, Esperance Plains and Mallee bioregions of southern Western Australia. Subspecies longissima grows in heath and mallee scrub in disjunct population near the south coast, subspecies seorsifolia grows in damp places, along swamp margins and temporary streams from the Stirling Range to near Israelite Bay and subspecies trichophylla is only known from the type location 13.4 km (8.3 mi) south-east of Tincurrin.

== Conservation status ==
Conostylis seorsiflora is listed as "not threatened" by the Western Australian Government Department of Biodiversity, Conservation and Attractions but subsp. longissima is listed as "Priority Two" meaning that it is poorly known and from only one or a few locations and subsp. trichophylla is listed as "Threatened Flora (Declared Rare Flora — Extant)".
