= List of State Register of Heritage Places in the Shire of Narrogin =

List of heritage sites in Western Australia

The State Register of Heritage Places is maintained by the Heritage Council of Western Australia. As of 2026, 188 places are heritage-listed in the Shire of Narrogin, of which 23 are on the State Register of Heritage Places.

== List ==
The Western Australian State Register of Heritage Places, as of 2026, lists the following 23 state registered places within the Shire of Narrogin:

Place name	Place #	Street number	Street name	Suburb or town	Co-ordinates	Notes & former names	Photo
Butter Factory (former)	1795	174	Federal Street	Narrogin	32.943348°S 117.17889°E	The Great Southern Co-operative Butter Co Ltd Part of Butter Factory & Managers Residence (former), Narrogin Precinct (19879)	
Courthouse Museum, Narrogin	1804	Corner	Earl and Egerton Street	Narrogin	32.933688°S 117.176653°E	Narrogin Courthouse, Agricultural Bank, Old Courthouse Museum, Narrogin Government School	
Mardoc Building, Narrogin	1811	40	Federal Street	Narrogin	32.933666°S 117.178504°E	Cornwall Buildings	
Narrogin Town Hall Complex	1814	80	Federal Street	Narrogin	32.934684°S 117.176313°E		
Commonwealth Bank, Narrogin	1816	29	Fortune Street	Narrogin	32.934948°S 117.177361°E		
National Bank, Narrogin	1817	27	Fortune Street	Narrogin	32.934992°S 117.177553°E		
Narrogin Post Office	1818	22	Fortune Street	Narrogin	32.934495°S 117.177664°E		
Narrogin Memorial Park & War Memorial Pavilion	1819	9	Williams Road	Narrogin	32.934259°S 117.175104°E		
Railway Houses	1824	2-4	Hale Street	Narrogin	32.936902°S 117.182509°E		
Narrogin Government Hospital (Site)	1827		Williams Road	Narrogin	32.936189°S 117.169503°E	Located east of the present hospital buildings	
Railway Institute Site	3450		Fairway Street	Narrogin	32.936749°S 117.179847°E		
Narrogin Railway Station	3521	2	Pioneer Drive	Narrogin	32.935692°S 117.18021°E		
Main Roads Migrant Camp (former), Narrogin	4760	1	Mokine R	Narrogin	32.947084°S 117.181675°E	Main Roads Narrogin Headquarters	
Railway Footbridge	4777		Fairway Street	Narrogin	32.935213°S 117.180356°E		
Railway Signal Cabin	4778		Fairway Street	Narrogin	32.934753°S 117.180022°E	Demolished in 2003	
Railway Goods Shed	4779	43	Federal Street	Narrogin	32.936109°S 117.179945°E		
Railway House Narrogin (former)	14860	6	Hale Street	Narrogin	32.937314°S 117.182495°E		
Narrogin Regional Hospital	15426		Williams Road	Narrogin	32.936325°S 117.168864°E	Narrogin Hospital	
Cottage BN382, Dryandra	17491			Narrogin		Manager's House	
Manager's Residence	18920	172	Federal Street	Narrogin	32.943348°S 117.17889°E	House 172 Federal Street Part of Butter Factory & Managers Residence (former), Narrogin Precinct (19879)	
Butter Factory & Managers Residence (former), Narrogin	19879	172-174	Federal Street	Narrogin	32.943348°S 117.17889°E	Art Deco House & Butter Factory, The Great Southern Co-operative Butter Co Ltd	
Railway House	24849	4	Hale Street	Narrogin	32.936830°S 117.182524°E		
Railway House	24855	2	Hale Street	Narrogin	32.936603°S 117.182519°E		
