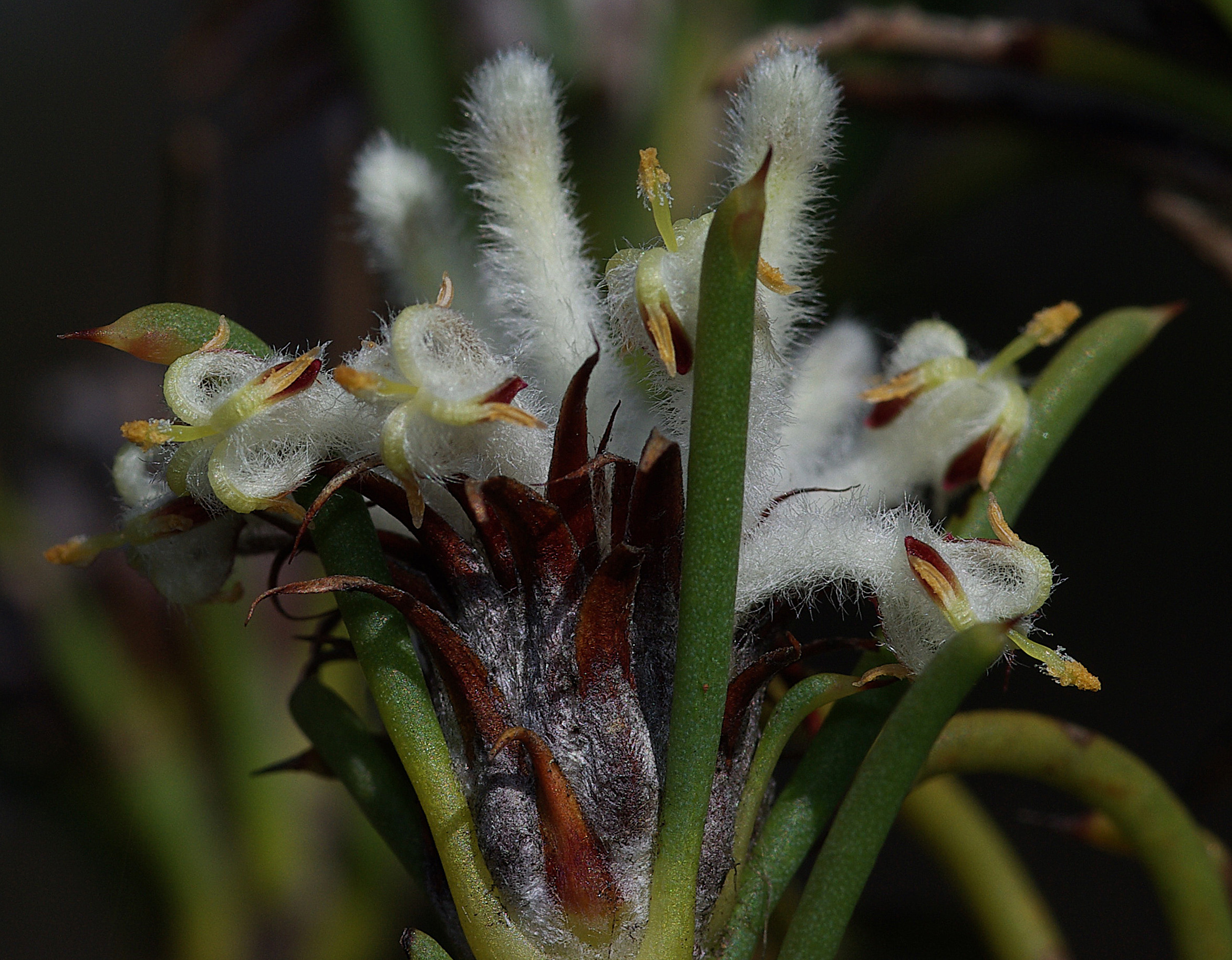
- Near Boddington

Scientific classification
- Kingdom: Plantae
- Clade: Tracheophytes
- Clade: Angiosperms
- Clade: Eudicots
- Order: Proteales
- Family: Proteaceae
- Genus: Petrophile
- Species: P. antecedens

Binomial name
- Petrophile antecedens Hislop & Rye

= Petrophile antecedens =

Species of shrub endemic to Western Australia

Petrophile antecedens is a species of flowering plant in the family Proteaceae and is endemic to the south-west of Western Australia. It is a small, erect, open shrub with sharply-pointed, cylindrical leaves and spherical heads of hairy, pale cream-coloured flowers.

== Description ==
Petrophile antecedens is an erect, open shrub that typically grows to a height of 0.3–0.5 m (1 ft 0 in – 1 ft 8 in) and has hairy branchlets. The leaves are cylindrical, 20–40 mm (0.79–1.57 in) long and 1–2 mm (0.039–0.079 in) wide with a sharply-pointed tip 1–2 mm (0.039–0.079 in) long. The flowers are arranged in sessile, spherical heads 20–30 mm (0.79–1.18 in) in diameter, with many narrow egg-shaped, densely hairy involucral bracts at the base. The flowers are 10–15 mm (0.39–0.59 in) long, pale cream-coloured and densely hairy. Flowering occurs from May to early June and the fruit is a nut, fused with others in a broadly oval or spherical head 12–15 mm (0.47–0.59 in) long and 10–13 mm (0.39–0.51 in) wide.

== Taxonomy ==
Petrophile antecedens was first formally described in 2002 by Michael Clyde Hislop and Barbara Lynette Rye in the journal Nuytsia from material collected by Fred Hort near Wandering in 2000. The specific epithet (antecedens) means "preceding", referring to the flowering of this species before that of almost all other petrophiles.

== Distribution and habitat ==
This petrophile mainly grows in eucalypt woodland, sometimes dense heath, and occurs in an area between Canning Dam, York, Darkan and Harrismith in the Avon Wheatbelt and Jarrah Forest biogeographic regions in the southwest of Western Australia.

== Conservation status ==
Petrophile antecedens is classified as "not threatened" by the Western Australian Government Department of Parks and Wildlife.
