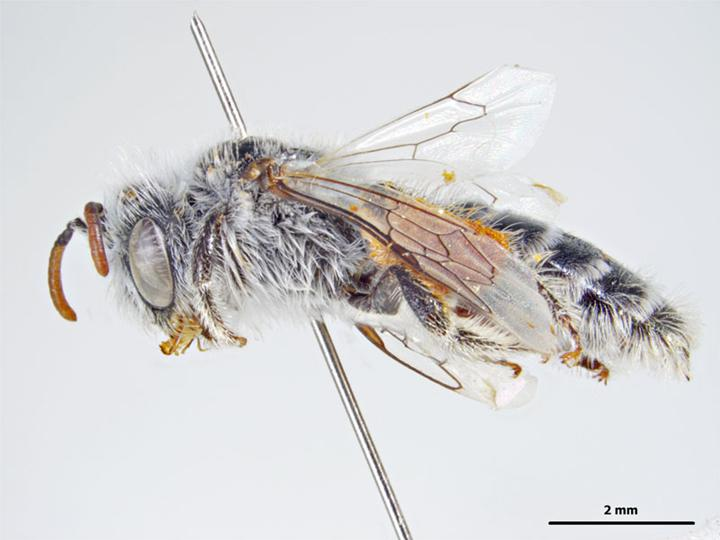
- Female

Scientific classification
- Kingdom: Animalia
- Phylum: Arthropoda
- Clade: Pancrustacea
- Class: Insecta
- Order: Hymenoptera
- Family: Colletidae
- Genus: Leioproctus
- Species: L. pappus

Binomial name
- Leioproctus pappus Houston, 1989

= Leioproctus pappus =

Species of bee

Leioproctus pappus, or Leioproctus (Leioproctus) pappus, is a species of bee in the family Colletidae and subfamily Colletinae. It is endemic to Australia. It was described by Australian entomologist Terry Houston in 1989.

== Etymology ==
The specific epithet pappus (Latin: "plant down") is an anatomical reference.

== Description ==
The male holotype body length is 7.8 mm, female paratype 9 mm. Integumental colouration is mainly glossy black; the hair is white.

== Distribution and habitat ==
The species occurs in south-west Western Australia from near Perth to Geraldton, as well as between Coolgardie and Southern Cross. The type locality is Boorabbin Rock.

== Behaviour ==
The adults are flying mellivores. Flowering plants visited by the bees include Conospermum stoechadis.

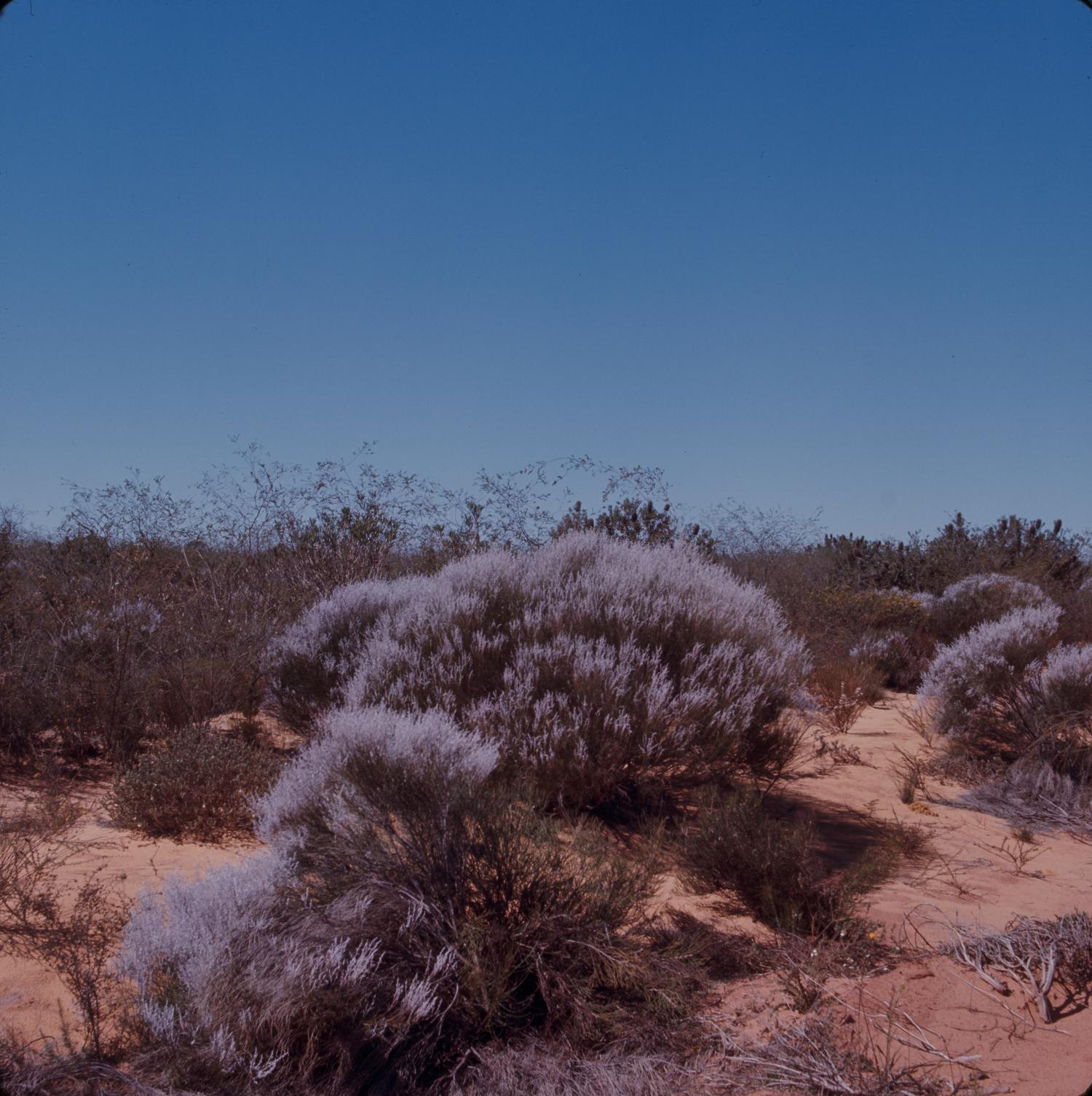
Conospermum stoechadis (common smokebush), a forage plant of the bees

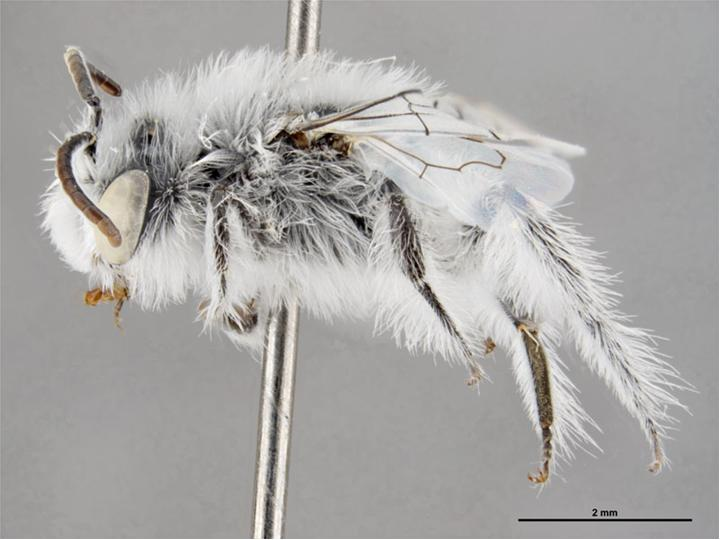
Male
