= Shire of Wickepin =

Local government area in the Wheatbelt region of Western Australia

- Local government area
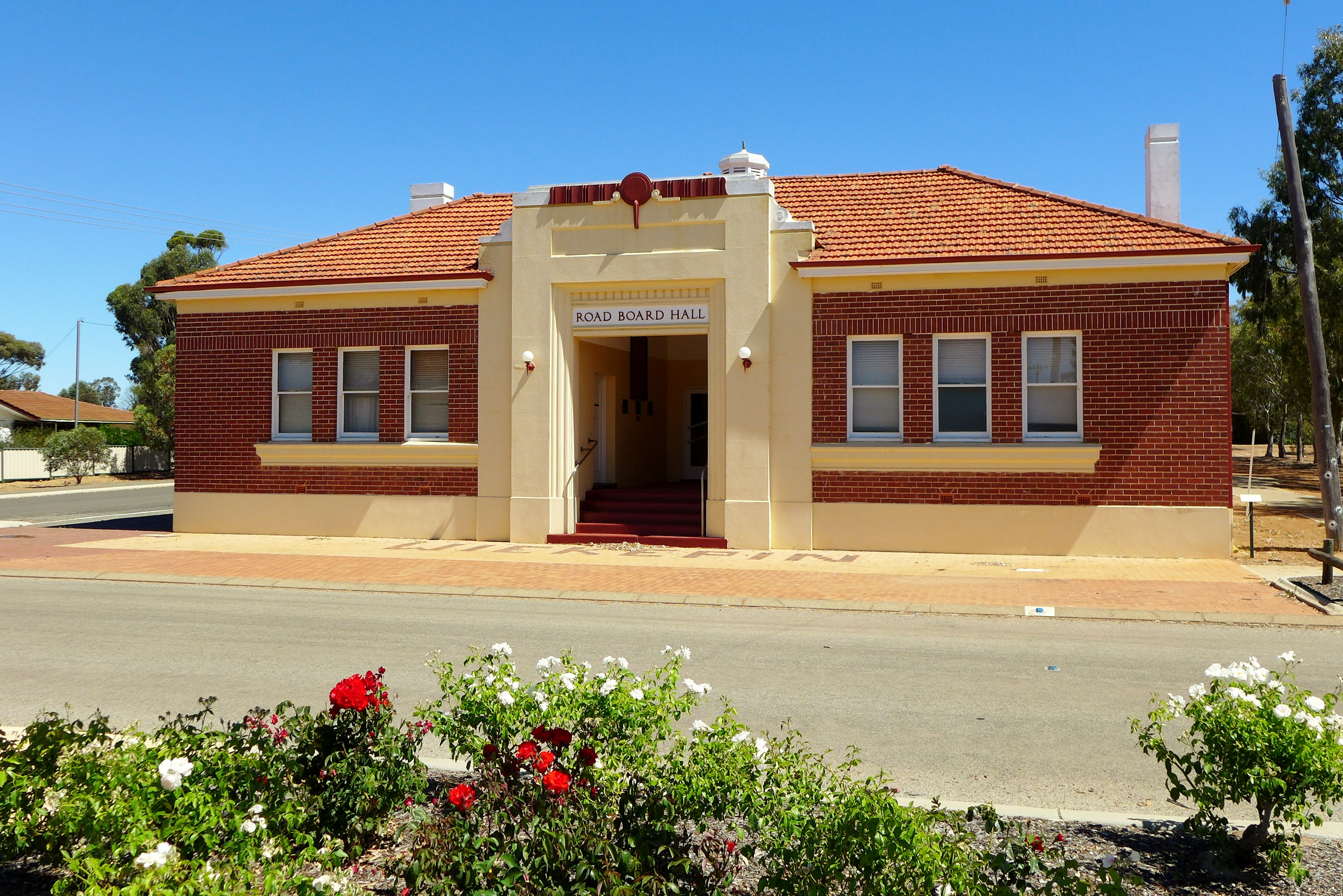
- Wickepin Town Hall, 2014
- Interactive map of Shire of Wickepin
- Country: Australia
- State: Western Australia
- Region: Wheatbelt
- Established: 1909
- Council seat: Wickepin

Government
  - Shire President: Julie Russell
  - State electorate: Roe
  - Federal division: O'Connor

Area
  - Total: 2,041.6 km^{2} (788.3 sq mi)

Population
  - Total: 690 (LGA 2021)
- Website: Shire of Wickepin
LGAs around Shire of Wickepin
Cuballing	Pingelly	Corrigin
Narrogin	Shire of Wickepin	Kulin
Wagin	Dumbleyung	Dumbleyung

The Shire of Wickepin is a local government area in the Wheatbelt region of Western Australia, east of Narrogin and about 220 kilometres (137 mi) southeast of the state capital, Perth. The Shire covers an area of 2,042 square kilometres (788 sq mi), and its seat of government is the town of Wickepin.

== History ==
The Wickepin Road District was established on 19 February 1909. The Road Board consisted of a chairman, secretary and seven members. On 1 July 1961, it became a shire under the Local Government Act 1960, which reformed all remaining road districts into shires.

== Wards ==
The Shire is at present undivided with its nine councillors representing the entire shire.

Until 20 October 2007 the shire was divided into 5 wards:

- Townsite Ward (2 councillors)
- North Ward (2 councillors)
- Central Ward (2 councillors)
- South Ward (2 councillors)
- East Ward (1 councillor)

== Towns and localities ==
The towns and localities of the Shire of Wickepin with population and size figures based on the most recent Australian census:

Locality	Population	Area	Map
East Wickepin	19 (SAL 2021)	136.4 km^{2} (52.7 sq mi)	
Gillimanning	21 (SAL 2021)	161.7 km^{2} (62.4 sq mi)	
Harrismith	52 (SAL 2021)	202.2 km^{2} (78.1 sq mi)	
Kirk Rock	18 (SAL 2021)	211.4 km^{2} (81.6 sq mi)	
Malyalling	20 (SAL 2021)	117.1 km^{2} (45.2 sq mi)	
Tincurrin	48 (SAL 2021)	245.1 km^{2} (94.6 sq mi)	
Toolibin	21 (SAL 2021)	210.5 km^{2} (81.3 sq mi)	
Wickepin	380 (SAL 2021)	374.6 km^{2} (144.6 sq mi)	
Wogolin	21 (SAL 2021)	206.6 km^{2} (79.8 sq mi)	
Yealering	91 (SAL 2021)	173.1 km^{2} (66.8 sq mi)	

== Population ==
Historical population

Year	Pop.	±% p.a.
1911	1,146	—
1921	1,454	+2.41%
1933	1,598	+0.79%
1947	1,153	−2.30%
1954	1,334	+2.10%
1961	1,276	−0.63%
1966	1,380	+1.58%
1971	1,144	−3.68%
1976	1,076	−1.22%

Year	Pop.	±% p.a.
1981	1,018	−1.10%
1986	951	−1.35%
1991	915	−0.77%
1996	833	−1.86%
2001	713	−3.06%
2006	716	+0.08%
2011	750	+0.93%
2016	718	−0.87%
2021	690	−0.79%

== Heritage-listed places ==
As of 2023, 213 places are heritage-listed in the Shire of Wickepin, of which one is on the State Register of Heritage Places, the Wickepin Nursing Post.

Place name	Place #	Street name	Suburb or town	Co-ordinates	Built	State registered	Notes & former names	Photo
Wickepin Nursing Post	2722	Wogolin Road	Wickepin	32.782128°S 117.507366°E	1926	24 November 2000	Wickepin District War Memorial Hospital	
