= Yealering, Western Australia =

Yealering
- Town
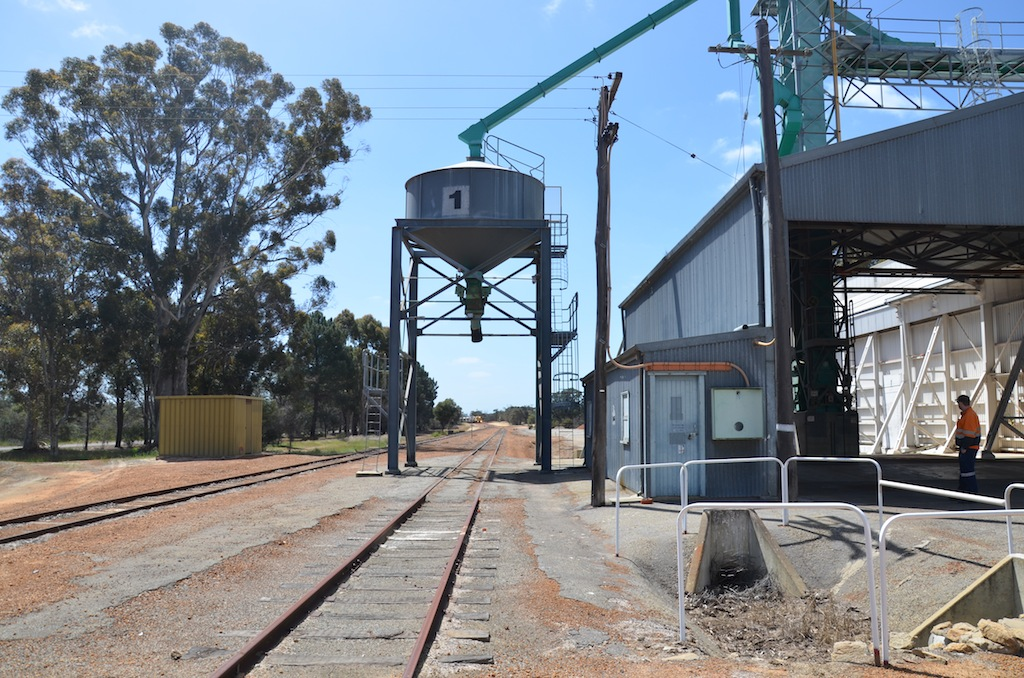
- View of Yealering silos, 2013.

- Coordinates: 32°36′00″S 117°38′00″E
- Country: Australia
- State: Western Australia
- LGA(s): Shire of Wickepin
- Location: 221 km (137 mi) from Perth; 27 km (17 mi) from Wickepin
- Established: 1907

Government
  - State electorate(s): Central Wheatbelt
  - Federal division(s): O'Connor

Area
  - Total: 173.1 km^{2} (66.8 sq mi)

Population
  - Total(s): 91 (SAL 2021)
- Postcode: 6372

Yealering is a town in the Wheatbelt region of Western Australia, approximately 220km south-east of Perth between the towns of Wickepin and Corrigin. It is located beside the lake of the same name. While the town's population is small, it services a large agricultural district in the northern Wickepin Shire. At the 2016 census, Yealering had a population of 104.

== History ==
Yealering's name is of Aboriginal origin and was first recorded in 1870 for the lake next to the town. It was first settled in the 1870s as a grazing lease and was later the site of a market garden. Yealering Lake was a valuable source of fresh water for the settlers. Community picnics and sporting days, for which the town became renowned, were held on the banks of the lake, and in dry years horse races were run on the lake bed.

Yealering was a siding on the Wickepin to Corrigin section of the Merredin to Narrogin railway line, which opened on 8 June 1914.

From 19 April 1944 to 29 September 1945 during World War II, Yealering had a prisoner of war camp which began with 100 Italian POWs, and when it closed there were 125 POWs. The W15 POW Control Centre was run by Lt. W. Baker from 19 April 1944 to 12 October 1944.

In 1907, land around Yealering was opened up for selection, and in 1908, the Yealering Lake Progress Association was formed. After the Government's announcement of a railway from Wickepin to Merredin, a townsite was surveyed and in 1912 the town was gazetted, and already by that stage included a primary school, post office and several other buildings. A hall made from local bricks was added in 1927.

== Present day ==
Yealering is an agricultural service town with a primary school, a recently refurbished hall, a general store and a hotel, as well as other businesses and services. The nearby lake has several recreational options including water skiing, an 18-hole golf course and a caravan park.

The surrounding areas produce wheat and other cereal crops. The town is a receival site for Cooperative Bulk Handling.

== See also ==
- Wheatbelt railway lines of Western Australia
