= A Fortunate Life =

1981 autobiography by Albert Facey

- Author: Albert Facey
- Cover artist: Robert Juniper
- Language: English
- Genre: Autobiographical, Drama
- Published: 1981 (Puffin, Hardcover Viking, Penguin Books Australia, Ltd.)
- Publication place: Australia
- Media type: Print (Hardback and Paperback)
- ISBN: 0670807060

A Fortunate Life is an autobiography by Albert Facey published in 1981, nine months before his death. It chronicles his early life in Western Australia, his experiences as a private during the Gallipoli campaign of World War I and his return to civilian life after the war. It also documents his extraordinary life of hardship, loss, friendship and love.

During the initial days of its publication, Albert Facey became a nationwide celebrity. Notwithstanding the interest in it, Facey considered his life to be simple and "had no idea what all the fuss was about". When asked in an interview, where the name of the book originated, he replied, "I called it 'A Fortunate Life' because I truly believe that is what I had".

It has become a classic piece of Australian literature and is one of Australia's most beloved books. As of 2020 it has, since its publication in 1981, sold over one million copies, becoming a primary account of the Australian experience during World War I. It is also featured in many Australian primary and secondary schools as a recommended book for young adults.

== Overview ==
=== Plot summary ===
The autobiography begins at his birth. Albert Barnett Facey was born in Maidstone, Victoria, Australia, in 1894, the youngest of seven children. His father died in 1896 of typhoid fever after moving to the Goldfields of Western Australia with Bert's two eldest brothers. In 1898, Bert's Grandpa became ill and died in October that year. Bert's mother then left the rest of her children to be looked after by their grandmother Mrs Jane Carr (born 1832 – died 1932), to go to the Goldfields, but met and married another man and had nothing further to do with Bert's upbringing. In 1899 Bert moved from Victoria to the Goldfields in the care of his grandmother, together with three of his six older siblings: Roy, Eric and Myra.

Most of his childhood was spent in the Wickepin area, some 200 kilometres (120 mi) south east of Perth. His aunt and her husband had been granted an agricultural lease there, so the children moved with them and Mrs Carr to start a farm. At the age of eight, although two older brothers remained, when a neighbouring farmer offered a wage and all found, Bert was put into service. His new employer, a horse thief, was given to violent drunken rages, but after being given a severe horsewhipping, Bert managed to escape. Work on subsequent farms were much better experiences and Bert's appreciation of life in the bush grew.

Bert had not lost touch with his uncle's farm, his grandmother and siblings. At the age of 14, when Roy and Eric resolved to go to live with their mother, who was by then in Perth, he took the decision to leave the very companionable family set-up he had found himself working for and go to live with her. He had had no contact with her for 12 years and it soon became clear that although his mother was pleased to see them all, she was more interested in the money they could provide. Bert left and took up work as a cattle drover. Over a period of six months he worked in a team moving cattle from the Ashburton River over 970 kilometres (600 miles) to market in Geraldton. During a furious storm he became separated from the other drovers and lost his way. He almost died of hunger and exposure before being found a week later by Aboriginals, who took care of him and lead him back to the drovers. Later he worked with the water board, clearing bores, digging channels and building water reservoirs and dams on wheat belt properties, even surviving the perilous collapse of a deep water bore his team was clearing. At the age of eighteen he began as a railway line navvy. Bert had developed an interest in boxing while in Perth, which was put to use dealing with the vindictive line construction overseer.

Throughout his childhood and teenage years, there had been no possibility of formal education, but Bert taught himself to read and write. Looking for work in the pre-war years, he realised that he was not comfortable with paperwork, offices and cities, far preferring life in the bush. He had become an accomplished horseman, bushman, and at 18 was a professional boxer.

In August 1915, during the Gallipoli campaign of the First World War, Joseph and Roy, two of his brothers, were killed, and Bert was badly wounded. He suffered severe problems, which the medics were unable to either explain or treat. Whilst recuperating, he met his future wife Evelyn Mary Gibson. The medics had given him two years to live, but they resolved to enjoy every day together and were married in Bunbury in August 1916.

The Faceys lived in East Perth before returning to Wickepin six years later with their children, where they lived until 1934. His wife died in 1976, shortly before what would have been their sixtieth wedding anniversary. The couple had seven children – the eldest, Barney, was killed during the Second World War – and twenty-eight grandchildren.

=== Origins and publishing history ===
Facey had been making notes on his life since an early age, and had been entertaining family and friends for decades with his stories which, over the years, became more and more polished (at times at the cost of historical accuracy). At the urging of his wife, he eventually wrote them up into a full manuscript, by hand, in a series of exercise books, working at the kitchen table. He then had the manuscript typed up and sent it to Fremantle Arts Centre Press, requesting that twenty copies be printed and bound for family members and friends. Facey's story was so remarkable, however, that it was immediately accepted for commercial publication. It appeared just nine months before his death on 11 February 1982, in his 88th year.

== Achievements ==
=== Awards and honours ===
Albert Facey and A Fortunate Life have been the recipients of a host of award nominations since the initial publication of the book but have only won two major book awards. It won the 1981 Banjo Award for Australian Literature and then the 1981 New South Wales Literacy Award.

In 2004 the book was named as Australia's 10th most popular on the ABC's My Favourite Book list.

== Publishing details ==
- Facey, Albert Barnett (1981). A Fortunate Life. Fremantle: Fremantle Press. ISBN 0-909144-37-0. LCCN 81175640. OCLC 8473825. OL 3856206M. Wikidata Q4656846.

== Other media ==
=== Miniseries ===
A Fortunate Life
- Based on: A Fortunate Life by Albert Facey
- Written by: Ken Kelso
- Directed by: Henri Safran; Marcus Cole
- Starring: Dominic Sweeney; Benedict Sweeney; Anthony Richards; Nikki Coghill; Dorothy Alison; Val Lehman; Bill Hunter; Ray Meagher; Marcus Graham
- Country of origin: Australia
- Original language: English
- No. of episodes: 4 × 92 minutes

Production
- Executive producer: Ian Bradley
- Producer: Bill Hughes
- Budget: A$6.3M

Original release
- Network: Nine Network
- Release: 9 March – 12 March 1986

A Fortunate Life was a miniseries based on the novel, screened in 1986 on the Nine Network. It was narrated by Bill Kerr and featured many well-known Australian actors. It also starred a cast of young actors who started their careers in the series: Scott Bartle, Antony Richards, Benedict Sweeney and Donovan Curyer Oshlack. It was filmed in Mount Tom Price, Coolgardie, Kalgoorlie, Bunbury, Mullewa, Fremantle and Victoria Park.

The miniseries was released on DVD by Umbrella Entertainment in March 2008 and is compatible with all region codes.

== Cast ==
- Scott Bartle as Bert aged 5
- Anthony Richards as Bert aged 9
- Benedict Sweeney as Bert aged 14
- Dominique Sweeney as Bert aged 18
- Donovan Curyer Oshlack as Roy aged 14–16
- Nikki Coghill as Evelyn
- Dorothy Alison as Grandma Carr
- Val Lehman as Bert's Mother
- Bill Hunter as Charlie Bibby
- Pat Bishop as Alice McCall
- Paul Sonkkila as Archie McCall
- Peter Cummins as Stepfather
- Martin Vaughan as Frank Phillips
- Carole Skinner as Shalagh Phillips
- Ray Meagher as Bad Bob
- Kirsty Child as Mrs Bibby
- Willie Fennell as Old Man
- Joy Hruby as Ma
- Frank Gallacher as Bill Oliver
- Catherine Wilkin as May Prang
- John Ewart as Bentley
- Marcus Graham
- Roger Ward as Martin
- Norman Yemm as Baldy
- Brett Climo as Terry
- Bill Kerr as Narrator
