= Harrismith, Western Australia =

Harrismith
- Town
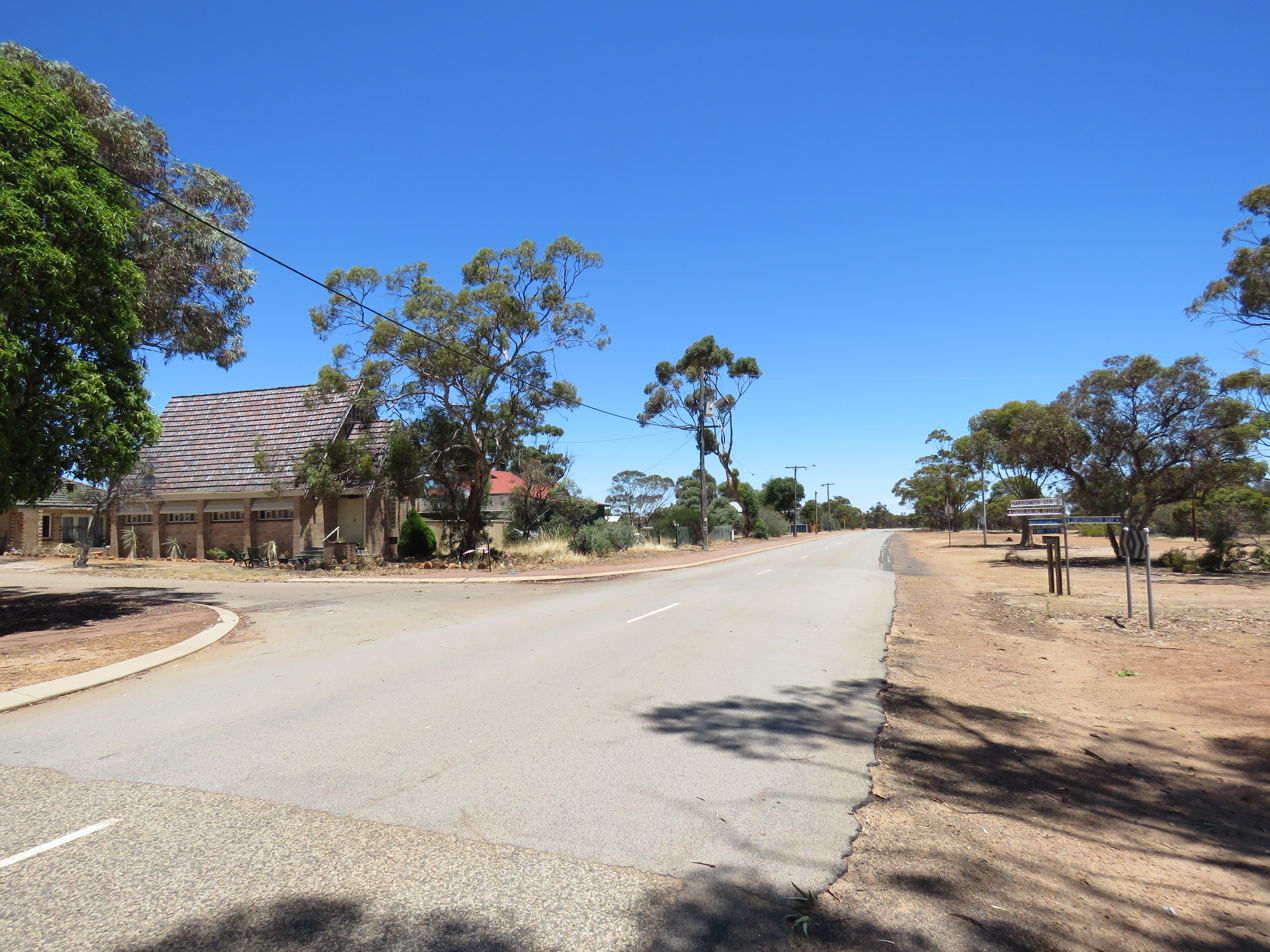
- Railway Avenue and the heritage listed Uniting Church in Harrismith in January 2024

- Interactive map of Harrismith
- Coordinates: 32.934°S 117.884°E
- Country: Australia
- State: Western Australia
- LGA: Shire of Wickepin
- Location: 259 km (161 mi) SE of Perth; 67 km (42 mi) E of Narrogin
- Established: 1914

Government
  - State electorate: Central Wheatbelt
  - Federal division: O'Connor

Area
  - Total: 202.2 km^{2} (78.1 sq mi)

Population
  - Total: 52 (SAL 2021)
- Postcode: 6361

Harrismith is a small town in the Wheatbelt region of Western Australia, approximately 260 kilometres (162 mi) south-east of Perth between the towns of Wickepin and Kulin.

== History ==
When a railway line was being constructed from Narrogin to Kondinin in 1914, the government placed a siding at this location, naming it "South Dorakin". However, local settlers opposed the name, and suggested Harrismith, after Harry Smith, the first settler in the vicinity. The name change was approved, and the town was gazetted in 1915.

== Present day ==
The town has a small hotel and caravan park as well as sports facilities. Other services are offered from nearby Tincurrin. The area around Harrismith is home to wildflowers in spring, especially verticordia.
