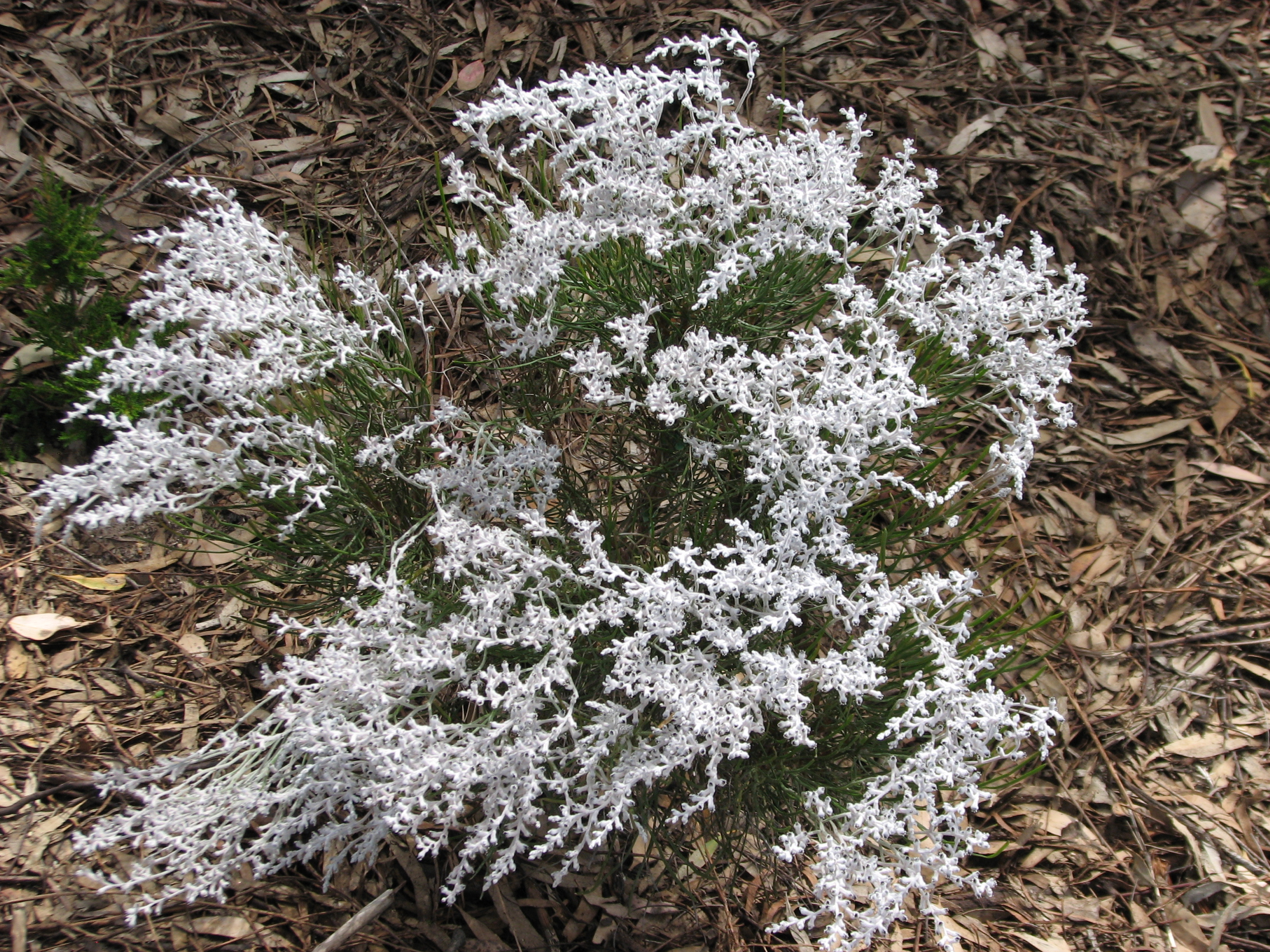

Scientific classification
- Kingdom: Plantae
- Clade: Tracheophytes
- Clade: Angiosperms
- Clade: Eudicots
- Order: Proteales
- Family: Proteaceae
- Genus: Conospermum
- Species: C. stoechadis

Binomial name
- Conospermum stoechadis Endl.

Synonyms
- Conospermum elegantulum Gand.; Conospermum proximum Gand.; Conospermum staechadis F.Muell. orth. var.

= Conospermum stoechadis =

Common smokebush

Species of Australian shrub

Conospermum stoechadis, commonly known as common smokebush, is a species of flowering plant in the family Proteaceae and is endemic to the south-west of Western Australia. It is an erect, compact shrub with thread-like leaves and spikes of woolly white, tube-shaped flowers.

== Description ==
Conospermum stoechadis is an erect, compact, multi-stemmed shrub that typically grows to a height of up to 2 m (6 ft 7 in). It has thread-like, to more or less linear leaves 20–170 mm (0.79–6.69 in) long and 0.6–2.25 mm (0.024–0.089 in) wide. The flowers are arranged in spike-like panicles with egg-shaped bracteoles 1.7–3 mm (0.067–0.118 in) long, 1.5–3.2 mm (0.059–0.126 in) wide and covered with velvety hairs. The flowers are white, and form a tube 2.5–5.5 mm (0.098–0.217 in) long. The upper lip is egg-shaped, 1.6–3 mm (0.063–0.118 in) long and 1.0–1.5 mm (0.039–0.059 in) wide and the lower lip is oblong, 0.4–1 mm (0.016–0.039 in) long and 0.2–0.3 mm (0.0079–0.0118 in) wide. Flowering depends on subspecies, and the fruit is a nut with woolly white hairs, 2.0–3.2 mm (0.079–0.126 in) long and 2.0–3.5 mm (0.079–0.138 in) wide.

== Taxonomy ==
Conospermum stoechadis was first formally described in 1838 by Stephan Endlicher in Stirpium Australasicarum Herbarii Hugeliani Decades Tres, based on material collected by Charles von Hügel from the vicinity of King George Sound. The specific epithet (stoechadis) is a pre-Linnean name for french lavender.

In 1995, Eleanor Marion Bennett described subspecies sclerophyllum and that name, and the name of the autonym are accepted by the Australian Plant Census:

- Conospermum stoechadis subsp. sclerophyllum (Lindl.) E.M.Benn. has leaves that are woolly-grey at maturity, and flowers from September to December.
- Conospermum stoechadis Endl. subsp. stoechadis has leaves that are woolly hairy when young, later glabrous and flowers from August to November.

== Distribution and habitat ==
Subspecies sclerophyllum occurs between Jurien Bay, Kulin and Wickepin where it grows in sand or gravel on sandplains in the Avon Wheatbelt, Geraldton Sandplains, Jarrah Forest, Mallee, Swan Coastal Plain bioregions of south-western Western Australia. Subspecies stoechadis is widespread between Kalbarri, Bungalbin Hill in the Helena and Aurora Range and Lake Grace where it grows in sand and laterite in the Avon Wheatbelt, Coolgardie, Esperance Plains, Geraldton Sandplains, Jarrah Forest, Mallee, Swan Coastal Plain and Yalgoo bioregions.

== Conservation status ==
Both subspecies of Conospermum stoechadis are listed as "not threatened" by the Government of Western Australia Department of Parks and Wildlife.
