= Tincurrin, Western Australia =

Tincurrin
- Town
- Coordinates: 32°58′37″S 117°46′30″E
- Country: Australia
- State: Western Australia
- LGA(s): Shire of Wickepin
- Location: 250 km (160 mi) from Perth; 58 km (36 mi) from Narrogin
- Established: 1914

Government
  - State electorate(s): Central Wheatbelt
  - Federal division(s): O'Connor

Area
  - Total: 245.1 km^{2} (94.6 sq mi)

Population
  - Total(s): 48 (SAL 2021)
- Postcode: 6361

Tincurrin is a small town in the Wheatbelt region of Western Australia, 250 kilometres (155 mi) south-east of Perth and within the Shire of Wickepin.

== History ==
Tincurrin's name is of Aboriginal origin, and was first recorded in 1892 by J. O. Oxley, a surveyor, for a spring in the area, but the meaning is not known. When a railway was being constructed from Narrogin to Kondinin in 1911, the government proposed a siding here, which was constructed in 1914 with the name "Tinkurrin". Land nearby was set aside for a townsite the following year, and in 1922 Tincurrin was gazetted. In 1925 a post office was built and in 1938-39 a one-classroom school (which today has 10 students) and CBH grain handling bins were constructed.

Tincurrin has a primary school (K-4), agricultural hall, Elders store (the general store having closed in 2004) and post office. The area around Tincurrin is home to wildflowers in spring, especially verticordia.

The surrounding areas produce wheat and other cereal crops. The town is a receival site for Cooperative Bulk Handling.
