= Narrogin =

Town in Wheatbelt, Western Australia

- Town
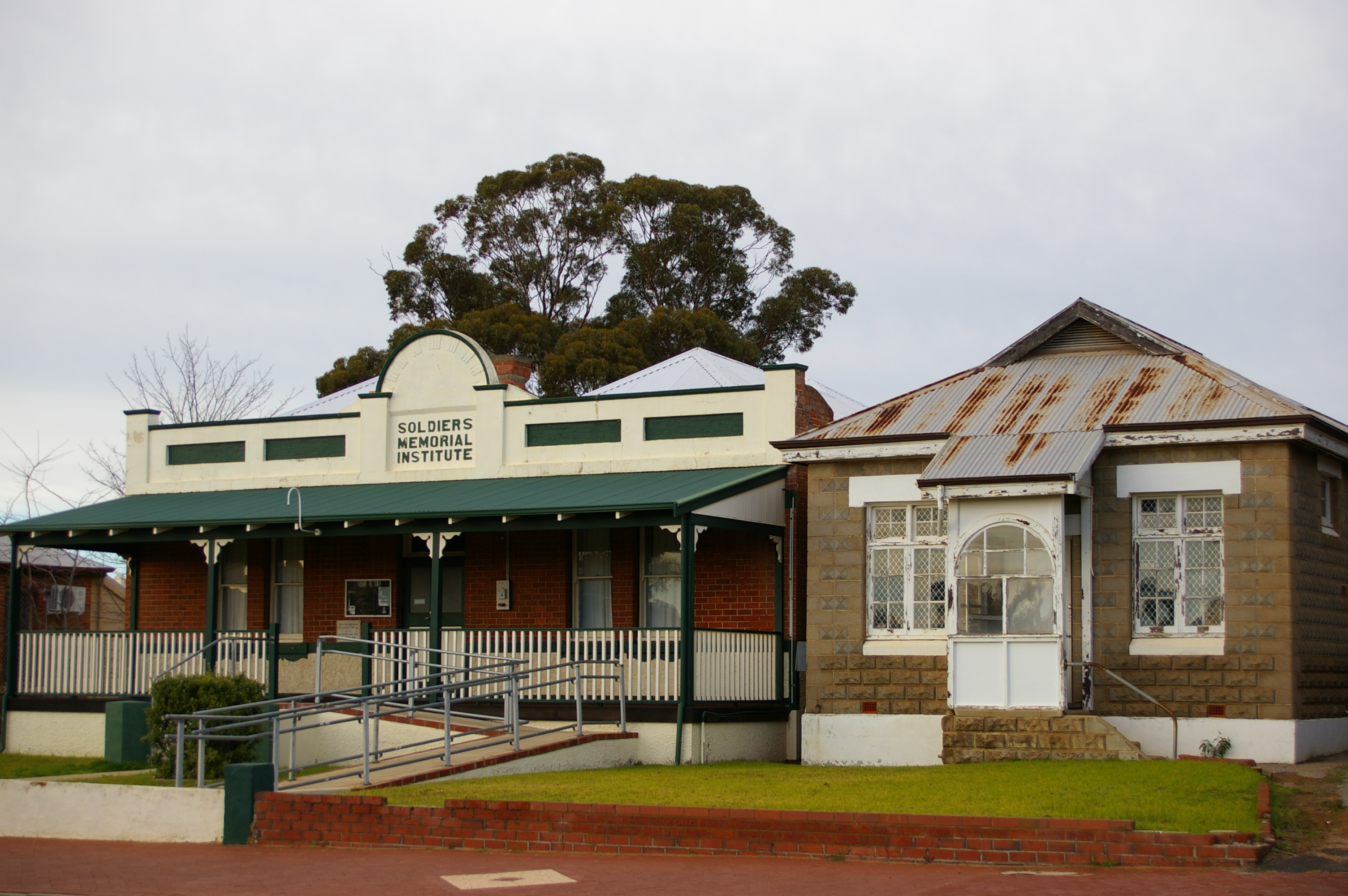
- Soldier memorial institute

- Interactive map of Narrogin
- Coordinates: 32.936°S 117.178°E
- Country: Australia
- State: Western Australia
- LGA: Shire of Narrogin
- Location: 192 km (119 mi) from Perth; 50 km (31 mi) from Wagin; 103 km (64 mi) from Katanning
- Established: 1890s

Government
  - State electorate: Roe
  - Federal division: O'Connor

Area
  - Total: 13.1 km^{2} (5.1 sq mi)
- Elevation: 340 m (1,120 ft)

Population
  - Total: 3,745 (UCL 2021)
- Postcode: 6312
- Mean max temp: 22.4 °C (72.3 °F)
- Mean min temp: 9.8 °C (49.6 °F)
- Annual rainfall: 488.5 mm (19.23 in)

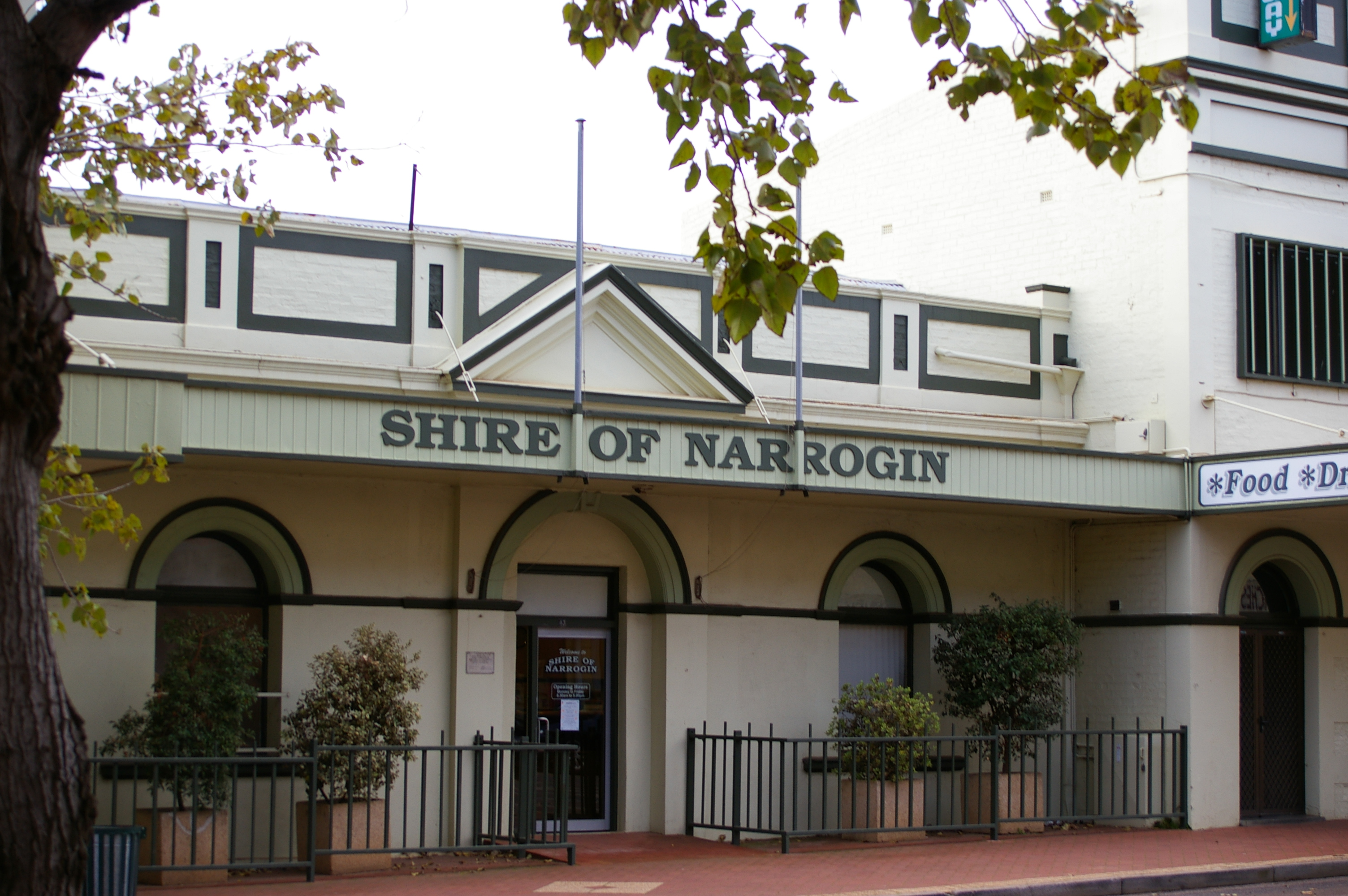
Shire of Narrogin building

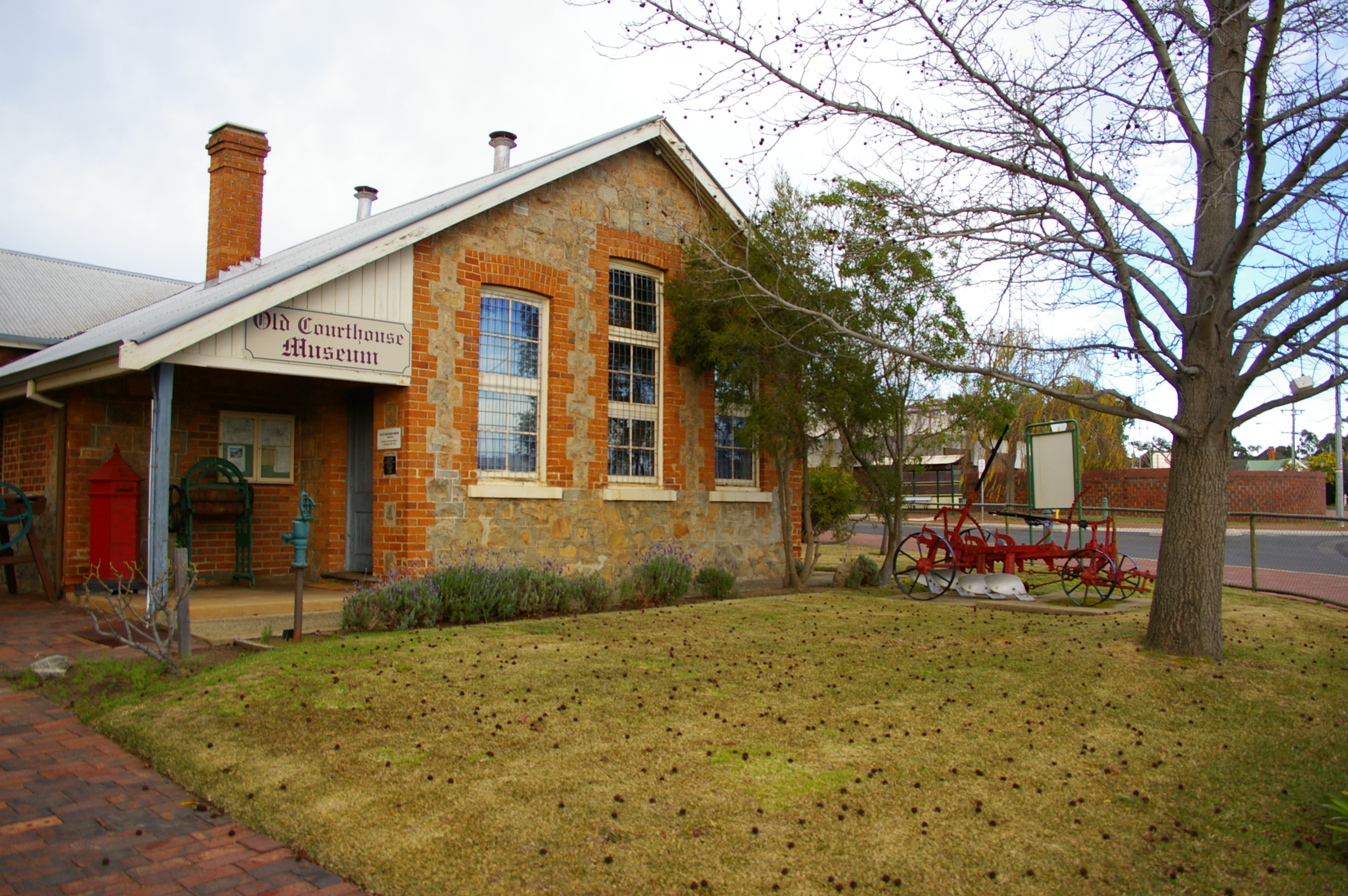
Old Courthouse Museum

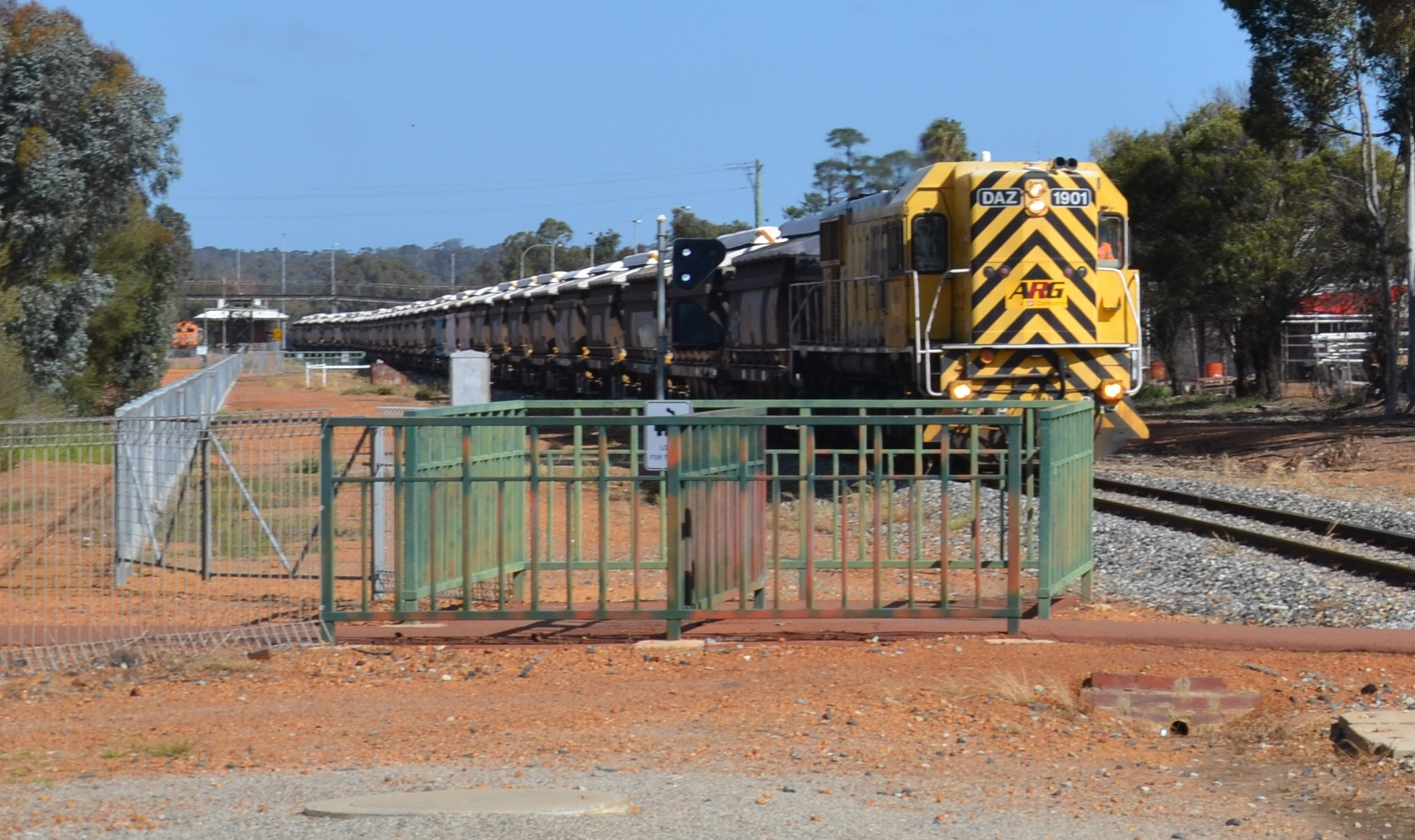
Train leaving the Narrogin yard

Narrogin is a town in the Wheatbelt region of Western Australia, 192 kilometres (119 mi) southeast of Perth on the Great Southern Highway between Pingelly and Wagin. In the age of steam engines, Narrogin was one of the largest railway operation hubs in the southern part of Western Australia.

== History ==
Narrogin is an Aboriginal name, having been first recorded as "Narroging" for a pool in this area in 1869. The meaning of the name is uncertain; various sources record it as "bat camp," "plenty of everything" or derived from "gnargagin" which means "place of water".

The first Europeans into the Narrogin area were Alfred Hillman and his party, who surveyed the track between Perth and Albany in 1835. They passed 10 kilometres (6.2 mi) west of the present site of Narrogin. In time they were followed by the occasional shepherd who drove his sheep into the area seeking good pastures.

The area was settled in the 1860s and 1870s when pastoralists moved and settled in isolated outposts. The population was so scattered that there was no incentive to establish a town.

Narrogin was officially declared a town in June 1897 and it was gazetted as a municipality on 13 April 1906. The early years of settlement were hard, with farmers relying on sandalwood cutting and the bark from mallee trees (it was used as a tanning agent) to compensate for poor returns from wheat and sheep.

By early 1898 the population of the town was 60, 35 males and 25 females. The local agricultural hall was opened the same year by Frederick Piesse.

== Rail centre ==
The arrival of the Great Southern Railway in July 1889 initiated the first hint of a town. The railway company was in search of good reliable watering points along the route from Perth to Albany. The company that had won the railway contract, the WA Land Company, duly purchased Narrogin pool, and it was around this pool that the town developed.

Narrogin was connected to six separate railway destinations – York, Wagin, Collie, Wickepin, Kulin and Boddington.

Narrogin remained a major rail centre until the late 1970s when competition from road transport saw a reduction in the railway's workforce. By 1987, Narrogin was very much in decline, largely as the result of altered working of engines through from Avon Yard. The station ceased to be served by scheduled passenger trains from 1978. The number of employees dropped from about 280 people to fewer than a dozen in 1995.

== Narrogin today ==
Narrogin's previous role as a major railway junction has acted as an attractor for agricultural service industries as well as government departments and agencies. The town has accumulated significant public infrastructure – mainly in the health and education areas. This infrastructure serves as the base for the modern regional centre that Narrogin has become today.

The Old Court House Museum is a major attraction for tourists. The building was designed by the architect George Temple-Poole and constructed in 1894. The building served as a Government school until 1905, when it became the local courthouse. A local branch of the Agricultural Bank was housed in the building between 1924 and 1945, but in 1970 it was converted again into the local courthouse. Since 1976, the building has been used as a museum, exhibiting displays of regional memorabilia.

The surrounding areas produce wheat and other cereal crops. The town is a receival site for the CBH Group.

== Climate ==
Narrogin has a Mediterranean climate characterised by hot, dry summers and cool, wet winters.

The highest temperature recorded in Narrogin was 44.7 °C (112.5 °F) on 3 February 2007; the lowest temperature recorded was −3.1 °C (26.4 °F) on 6 September 1956. Narrogin's highest daily rainfall occurred on 29 January 1990 when 150.0 millimetres (5.91 in) of rain was recorded.

Climate data for Narrogin (climate data: 1891–2024)
Month	Jan	Feb	Mar	Apr	May	Jun	Jul	Aug	Sep	Oct	Nov	Dec	Year
Record high °C (°F)	43.7 (110.7)	44.7 (112.5)	40.9 (105.6)	36.1 (97.0)	32.2 (90.0)	26.2 (79.2)	23.0 (73.4)	26.3 (79.3)	36.4 (97.5)	37.8 (100.0)	42.1 (107.8)	43.2 (109.8)	44.7 (112.5)
Mean daily maximum °C (°F)	31.1 (88.0)	30.3 (86.5)	27.4 (81.3)	23.1 (73.6)	18.6 (65.5)	15.6 (60.1)	14.7 (58.5)	15.5 (59.9)	17.8 (64.0)	21.3 (70.3)	25.7 (78.3)	29.1 (84.4)	22.5 (72.5)
Mean daily minimum °C (°F)	14.3 (57.7)	14.4 (57.9)	13.2 (55.8)	10.6 (51.1)	7.8 (46.0)	6.3 (43.3)	5.3 (41.5)	5.2 (41.4)	6.0 (42.8)	7.5 (45.5)	10.2 (50.4)	12.5 (54.5)	9.4 (48.9)
Record low °C (°F)	4.3 (39.7)	3.9 (39.0)	3.3 (37.9)	−0.4 (31.3)	−2.4 (27.7)	−2.7 (27.1)	−2.7 (27.1)	−2.7 (27.1)	−3.1 (26.4)	−1.7 (28.9)	0.0 (32.0)	1.8 (35.2)	−3.1 (26.4)
Average rainfall mm (inches)	12.7 (0.50)	16.6 (0.65)	21.5 (0.85)	28.9 (1.14)	61.7 (2.43)	84.3 (3.32)	85.7 (3.37)	67.7 (2.67)	46.1 (1.81)	30.8 (1.21)	18.3 (0.72)	13.7 (0.54)	487.5 (19.19)
Average rainy days	2.4	2.9	4.0	6.2	10.9	14.5	15.7	14.3	11.3	8.4	5.2	3.0	98.8
Source: Bureau of Meteorology

== Sport ==
In 1951 the Australian Grand Prix was held on a 7.1-kilometre (4.4 mi) circuit through the town's streets. The event attracted a crowd estimated at 35,000, and was won by Warwick Pratley driving an Australian developed car. An annual race meeting was held on a shorter 3.5-kilometre (2.2 mi) circuit starting in 1948, replacing Pingelly as host of the Great Southern Flying 50. Racing in Narrogin ceased after the 1955 Le Mans disaster.

The town also acts as a hub for sporting competitions in the surrounding regions. Facilities were improved in recent years with the development of the Narrogin Leisure Complex, which houses a 25-metre (82 ft) indoor heated pool with leisure pool, gymnasium, café, squash courts, basketball stadiums as well as a world class wet synthetic hockey turf.

== Military history ==
During World War II, Narrogin was the location of RAAF No.25 Inland Aircraft Fuel Depot, built in 1942 and closed on 14 June 1944. It was situated on Granite Road. Usually consisting of 4 tanks, 31 fuel depots were built across Australia for the storage and supply of aircraft fuel for the Royal Australian Air Force and the United States Army Air Forces at a total cost of £900,000 ($1,800,000).

== Notable residents ==
- Barry Cable, Perth and North Melbourne Australian rules football player came from Narrogin
- Albert Facey (1894–1982), author of A Fortunate Life, lived a period of his life in Narrogin
- Bevan George, field hockey player who won the gold medal with the Australian Men's Team at the 2004 Summer Olympics in Athens
- Brian Glencross, retired Australian field hockey player and coach of the Australian Women's Team
- Brad Hogg, retired Australian cricketer, current player of the Melbourne Renegades and former player for the Perth Scorchers
- Shaun Marsh, Australian cricketer and the elder son of retired cricketer Geoff Marsh
- Matthew Tonts, professor of geography, The University of Western Australia and Chair of the Western Australian Environmental Protection Authority was born and grew up in Narrogin
- Mudrooroo, novelist, poet, essayist and playwright, was born in Narrogin.
- Rex T. Prider (1910–2005), Professor of Geology, University of Western Australia (1949–1975), was born and grew up in Narrogin
- Stephen Smith, Australian Labor Party politician

== See also ==
- Narrogin Senior High School
