= Wickepin =

Town in the Wheatbelt region of Western Australia

- Town
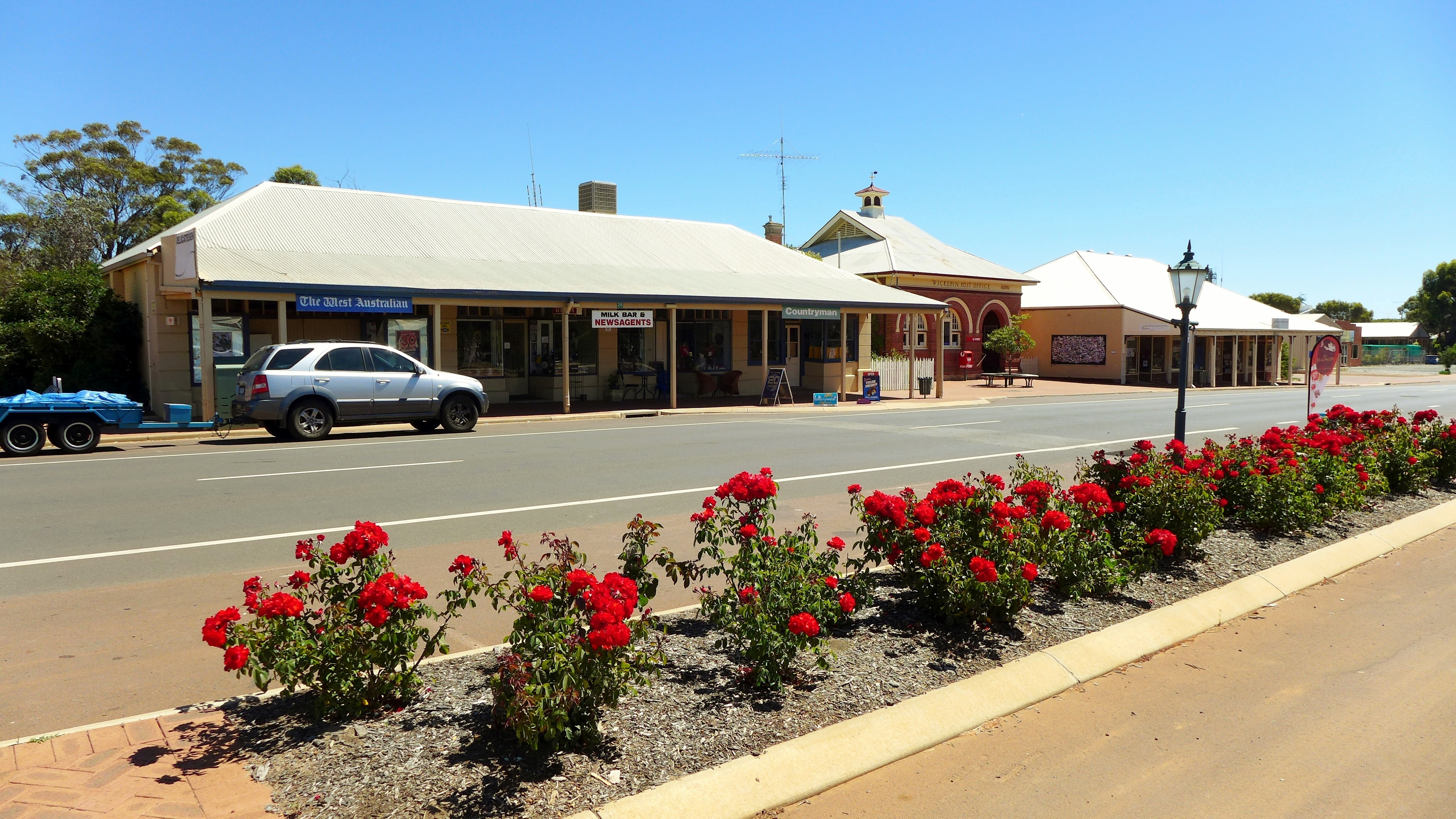
- Wogolin Road, Wickepin, 2014

- Interactive map of Wickepin
- Coordinates: 32°47′00″S 117°30′00″E
- Country: Australia
- State: Western Australia
- Region: Wheatbelt
- LGA: Shire of Wickepin
- Location: 214 km (133 mi) SE of Perth; 38 km (24 mi) E of Narrogin
- Established: 1908

Government
  - State electorate: Roe
  - Federal division: O'Connor

Area
  - Total: 374.6 km^{2} (144.6 sq mi)
- Elevation: 337 m (1,106 ft)

Population
  - Total: 266 (UCL 2021)
- Postcode: 6370

Wickepin is a town in the Wheatbelt region of Western Australia, 214 kilometres (133 mi) south-east of Perth and 38 kilometres (24 mi) east of Narrogin. Wickepin had a population of 380 at the 2021 census.

== History ==
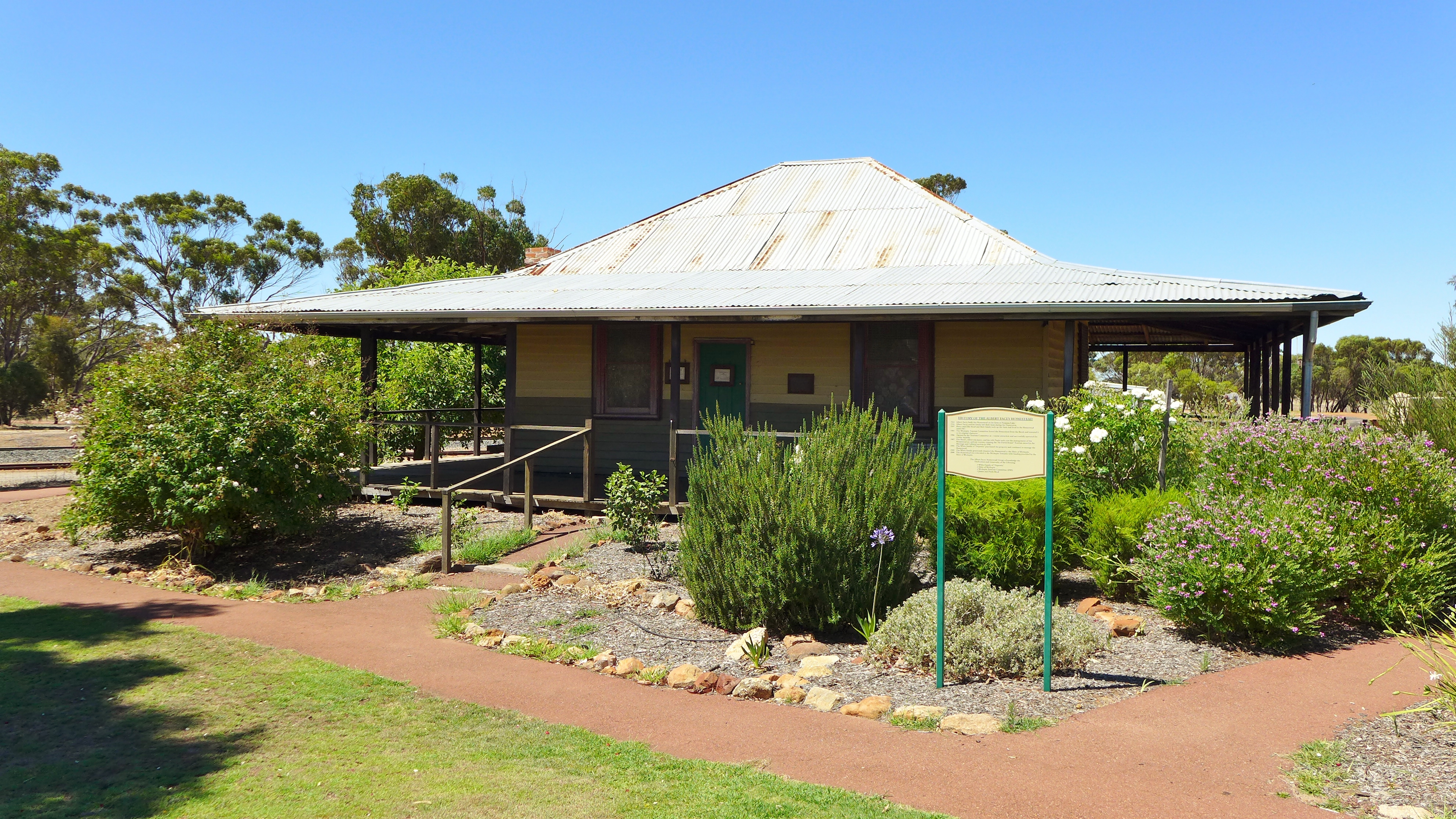
The Albert Facey Homestead, 2014

Wickepin's name is of Aboriginal origin, first recorded in 1881, but the meaning is not known. Until 1908, the area was sometimes known as Yarling, the name of a spring in the area; Yarling Well is 8 km (5.0 mi) west of the town. The area was leased in the early 1870s, but started to grow after the construction of the Great Southern Railway in 1889. The land was opened up by the State Government in 1893, and by 1906 a town had started to develop.

In 1908, plans were announced to extend the railway from Narrogin to Wickepin, and the town was gazetted in June of that year. Seven months later, the Road Board (later Shire Council) was constituted and the railway commenced operations. In the years prior to the First World War Wickepin was an important service centre, featuring three banks, blacksmiths and other businesses as well as a post office and railway buildings.

Dorothy Hewett, most famous author of the wheatbelt, lived as a child on a prosperous farm about 15 km north-east of the town between 1923 and 1935. Her grandparents also operated the General Store in Wickepin. Two of her plays, The Man from Mukinupin and Field of Dreams, and a dozen of her most celebrated poems, especially "Legend of the Green Country" and "Once I Rode with Clancy", are set in the area.

Albert Facey, Gallipoli veteran and author of A Fortunate Life, lived south of the town from 1922 to 1934 with his family.

From 1917 until 1964, Wickepin hosted an agricultural show in October of each year.

== Present day ==
Wickepin is a service town for the surrounding agricultural district, and contains recreational facilities, historic buildings from its boom period in the 1910s–1920s, a telecentre, public library and caravan park. Albert Facey's house was moved to the main street of Wickepin in 2000 and is open to visitors. Wickepin has a primary school, first opened in 1911, with high school students travelling by school bus to Narrogin.

== See also ==
- Wheatbelt railway lines of Western Australia
