= Yarra Creek =

- Town
- Coordinates: 40°00′31″S 144°06′40″E
- Country: Australia
- State: Tasmania
- Region: King Island
- LGA: King Island
- Location: 31 km (19 mi) SE of Currie

Government
  - State electorate: Braddon
  - Federal division: Braddon
- Postcode: 7256
Localities around Yarra Creek
Pegarah	Pegarah	Bass Strait
Lymwood	Yarra Creek	Bass Strait
Lymwood	Grassy	Bass Strait

Yarra Creek is a rural locality in the local government area of King Island on King Island in Bass Strait, north of Tasmania. It is located about 31 kilometres (19 mi) south-east of the town of Currie, the administrative centre for the island.

== History ==
The farming community of Yarra Creek was established as part of the Soldier Settlement Scheme after World War II.

The 2016 census determined a population of 36 for the state suburb of Yarra Creek. At the 2021 census, the population had dropped to 19.

== Geography ==
Bass Strait forms the eastern boundary.

== Road infrastructure ==
The C202 route enters from the west as Yarra Creek Road and runs to the village of Yarra Creek in the centre, where it turns north as Millwood Road before exiting.
