= Wickham, Tasmania =

Wickham Tasmania
- Coordinates: 39°36′57″S 143°59′18″E
- Population: 9 (2016 census)
- Postcode(s): 7256
- Location: 41 km (25 mi) N of Currie
- LGA(s): King Island
- Region: King Island
- State electorate(s): Braddon
- Federal division(s): Braddon
Localities around Wickham:
Bass Strait	Bass Strait	Bass Strait
Bass Strait	Wickham	Egg Lagoon
Bass Strait	Egg Lagoon	Egg Lagoon

Wickham is a rural locality in the local government area of King Island on King Island in Bass Strait, north of Tasmania. It is located about 41 kilometres (25 mi) north of the town of Currie, the administrative centre for the island. The 2016 census determined a population of 9 for the state suburb of Wickham.

== Geography ==
Bass Strait forms the western and northern boundaries.

== Road infrastructure ==
The B25 route (Rocky Point Road / Cape Wickham Road) enters from the south and runs north and west to the village of Wickham, where it turns north and continues to Cape Wickham Lighthouse.
