= King Island Dairy =

Australian dairy factory

- Type: Cheese
- Industry: Dairy industry
- Founded: 1902; 124 years ago in Tasmania, Australia
- Headquarters: Loorana, King Island, Australia
- Parent: Saputo Inc. 2019-2025
- Website: www.kingislanddairy.com.au

King Island Dairy is an Australian dairy factory, which has been operating from King Island in the Bass Strait, since 1902. The dairy makes highly acclaimed and awarded blue, cheddar, brie and camembert specialty cheeses and is the largest employer on King Island.

== History ==
The first known dairy, King Island Dairy Factory Co. Ltd, on King Island, was established in 1892.

An additional dairy, King Island Co-operative Dairy Factory Company Limited, was proposed on 22 March 1902, with E. Cooper as chairman and F. J. Robinson as secretary, based on agricultural experts' reports on the climatic suitability of the island for a small scale dairy industry. Construction of the dairy, at Loorana, (£310 for the building and £390 for machinery) commenced in June that year. The first shipment of butter occurred in September. By March 1904 they had 900 cows supplying milk to the dairy. In 1905 the company increased the area of the factory site.

In 1936 Archibald Gunn, established a cheese and butter factory, A. E. Gunn Pty Ltd, at Wickham, which produced the first cheeses on the island. Two years later the business merged with the King Island Co-operative Dairy Factory.

In 1945 there was a proposed merger with the Melbourne-based, Kraft Walker Cheese Company, the proposal however fell through and in 1947 the decision was made to cease cheese production, and the Wickham factory was closed. King Island Dairy Products Co-operative Society Limited continued to produce butter, and subsequently dried milk powder and whole milk.

During the mid-1970s, the King Island Dairy was in financial difficulties, ceasing butter production in 1975, and in 1977 receivers were appointed.

On 1 July 1978, William J. and Robyn Kirk, Interlandi Cheese (Tasmania), bought the King Island Dairy for $180,000. The dairy, now known as King Island Dairy Products, at first, made processed cheese for Kraft Foods to sell to the Middle East. The Kirks in 1984, with financial assistance from the Tasmanian Development Authority, reorientated the company's upmarket cheese production, launching a signature Brie in April 1985. The Tasmanian government dispossessed the Kirks in early 1986, for their outstanding loan, and sold King Island Dairy to Transequity, a Melbourne-based company, for $300,000. Later that year, Transequity was acquired by Agricorp, an agribusiness consultancy.

In 1992 a group of Melbourne investors, bought the shares from Agricorp and converted it into an unlisted public company, the Island Food Company. By 1998 there were over 9,000 cows, mainly Friesian on the island.

National Foods purchased the King Island Dairy in 2002 for $77 million. In 2007, Kirin, a Japanese conglomerate, bought National Foods for $2.8 billion. In 2009, Kirin acquired 100% ownership of Lion Nathan and merged it with National Foods. In 2011, Lion Nathan National Foods separated into two divisions: Lion; and Lion Dairy & Drinks.

In 2019 Saputo Inc, a Canadian multinational, purchased the Lion Dairy and Drinks division from Kirin, which included King Island Dairy.

In March 2025, after initial reports in September 2024 that the dairy would close, it was announced that King Island Dairy had been purchased from Saputo Inc by business partners and cheesemakers Nick Dobromilsky and Graeme Wilson for an undisclosed sum and would remain in operation. The purchase marks the dairy's return to Australian ownership after 25 years of foreign ownership.

== Products ==
- Soft white cheese
  - Brie
  - Double Brie
  - Triple Cream Brie
  - Camembert
- Washed rind cheese
- Blue vein cheese
  - Danish Blue
  - Blue Brie
  - Ash Blue
  - Blue Cheshire
- Cheddar cheese
  - Smoked Cheddar
  - Blue Cheddar
  - Bush Pepper Cheddar

== See also ==
- Dairy farming in Australia
- List of cheesemakers
- List of oldest companies in Australia
