= Lymwood =

- Town
- Coordinates: 40°05′25″S 143°59′36″E
- Country: Australia
- State: Tasmania
- Region: King Island
- LGA: King Island
- Location: 27 km (17 mi) SE of Currie

Government
  - State electorate: Braddon
  - Federal division: Braddon

Population
  - Total: 114 (2016 census)
- Postcode: 7256
Localities around Lymwood
Nugara	Pegarah	Pegarah
Nugara, Pearshape	Lymwood	Grassy, Yarra Creek
Surprise Bay	Bass Strait	Bass Strait

Lymwood is a rural locality in the local government area of King Island on King Island in Bass Strait, north of Tasmania. It is located about 27 kilometres (17 mi) south-east of the town of Currie, the administrative centre for the island. The 2016 census determined a population of 114 for the state suburb of Lymwood.

== History ==
Lymwood was the name of the original property in the area.

== Geography ==
Bass Strait forms the south-eastern boundary, and the Seal River forms the south-western boundary.

== Road infrastructure ==
The B25 route (Grassy Road) runs through from north to south-east. Route C201 (Old Grassy Road) starts at an intersection with B25 and runs north-west until it exits. Route C202 (Yarra Creek Road) starts at an intersection with B25 and runs east until it exits.
