= Pearshape =

- Town
- Coordinates: 40°03′59″S 143°53′05″E
- Country: Australia
- State: Tasmania
- Region: North-west and west
- LGA: King Island
- Location: 26 km (16 mi) S of Currie

Government
  - State electorate: Braddon
  - Federal division: Braddon

Population
  - Total: nil (2016 census)
- Postcode: 7256
Localities around Pearshape
Southern Ocean	Nugara	Pegarah
Southern Ocean	Pearshape	Pegarah, Lymwood
Southern Ocean	Surprise Bay	Surprise Bay

Pearshape is a rural locality in the local government area (LGA) of King Island in the North-west and west LGA region of Tasmania. The locality is about 26 kilometres (16 mi) south of the town of Currie. The 2016 census recorded a population of nil for the state suburb of Pearshape.

== History ==
Pearshape is a confirmed locality. It is believed to be so named because of the shape of a lagoon in the area.

== Geography ==
The waters of the Southern Ocean form the western boundary.

== Road infrastructure ==
An un-numbered route (South Road) runs through from north to south.
