= Christmas Island (Tasmania) =

Island in Tasmania, Australia

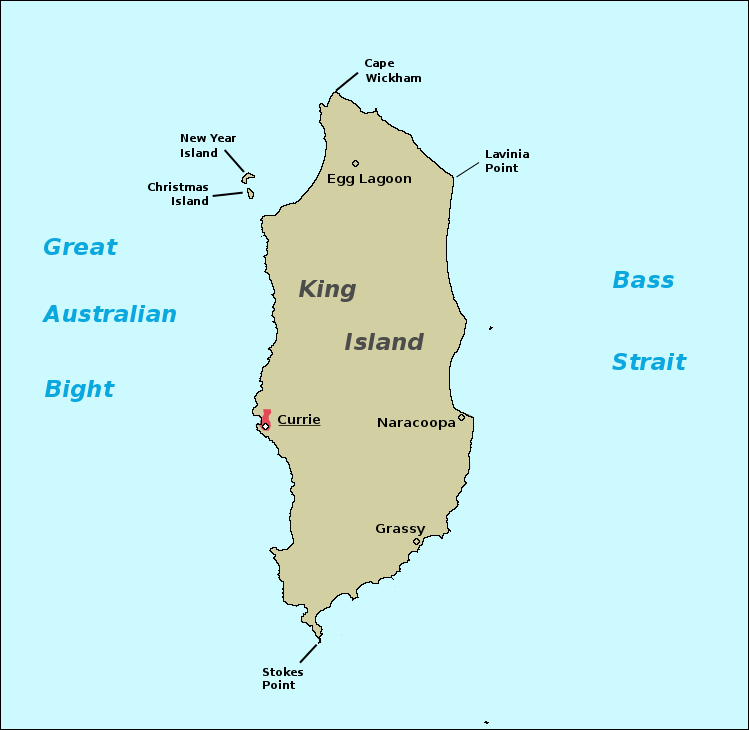
- Christmas Island, located top left, relative to King Island

- Location within Tasmania

Geography
- Location: Roaring Forties, Bass Strait
- Coordinates: 39°40′48″S 143°49′12″E
- Archipelago: New Year Group
- Area: 63.49 ha (156.9 acres)

Administration
- Australia
- State: Tasmania
- LGA: Municipality of King Island

Christmas Island, part of the New Year Group, is a 63.49-hectare (156.9-acre) granite island located in the Great Australian Bight, lying off the north-west coast of Tasmania, Australia.

== New Year Group ==
There are four islands in the New Year Group. Besides Christmas Island, these are:

- King Island,
- New Year Island and
- Councillor Island.

While King Island has the largest area of the four islands, the group is named after New Year Island because it was discovered by Europeans a few days earlier than King Island.

== Fauna ==
Breeding seabird and shorebird species include little penguin, short-tailed shearwater, Pacific gull, silver gull, sooty oystercatcher, pied oystercatcher and black-faced cormorant. Reptiles include tiger snakes and lizards. A species of mouse is present.

The island forms part of the King Island Important Bird Area because of its importance for breeding seabirds and waders.

== Geography ==
According to the International Hydrographic Organization, the line separating the Bass Strait from the Great Australian Bight runs through King Island, so Christmas Island lies in the Great Australian Bight.

Christmas Island is not to be confused with Little Christmas Island on Tasmania's east coast or the Australian external territory Christmas Island in the Indian Ocean.

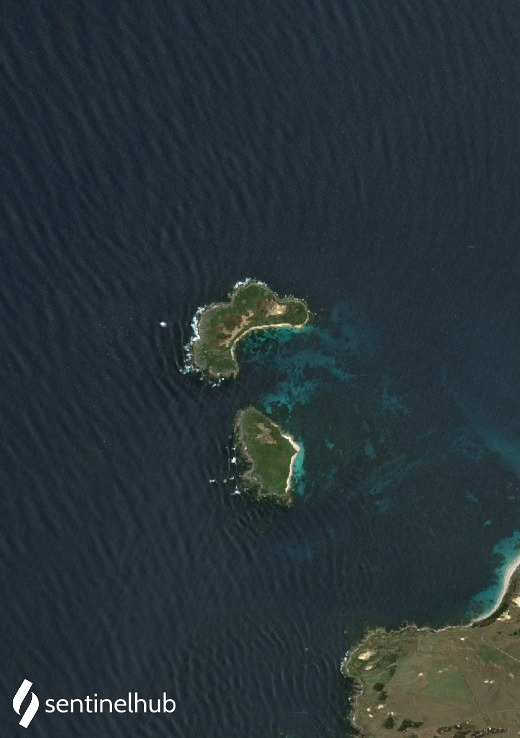
New Year Island (centre, north), Christmas Island (centre, south) and King Island (bottom-right)

== See also ==
- List of islands of Tasmania
