= Currie Lighthouse =

Lighthouse in Tasmania, Australia

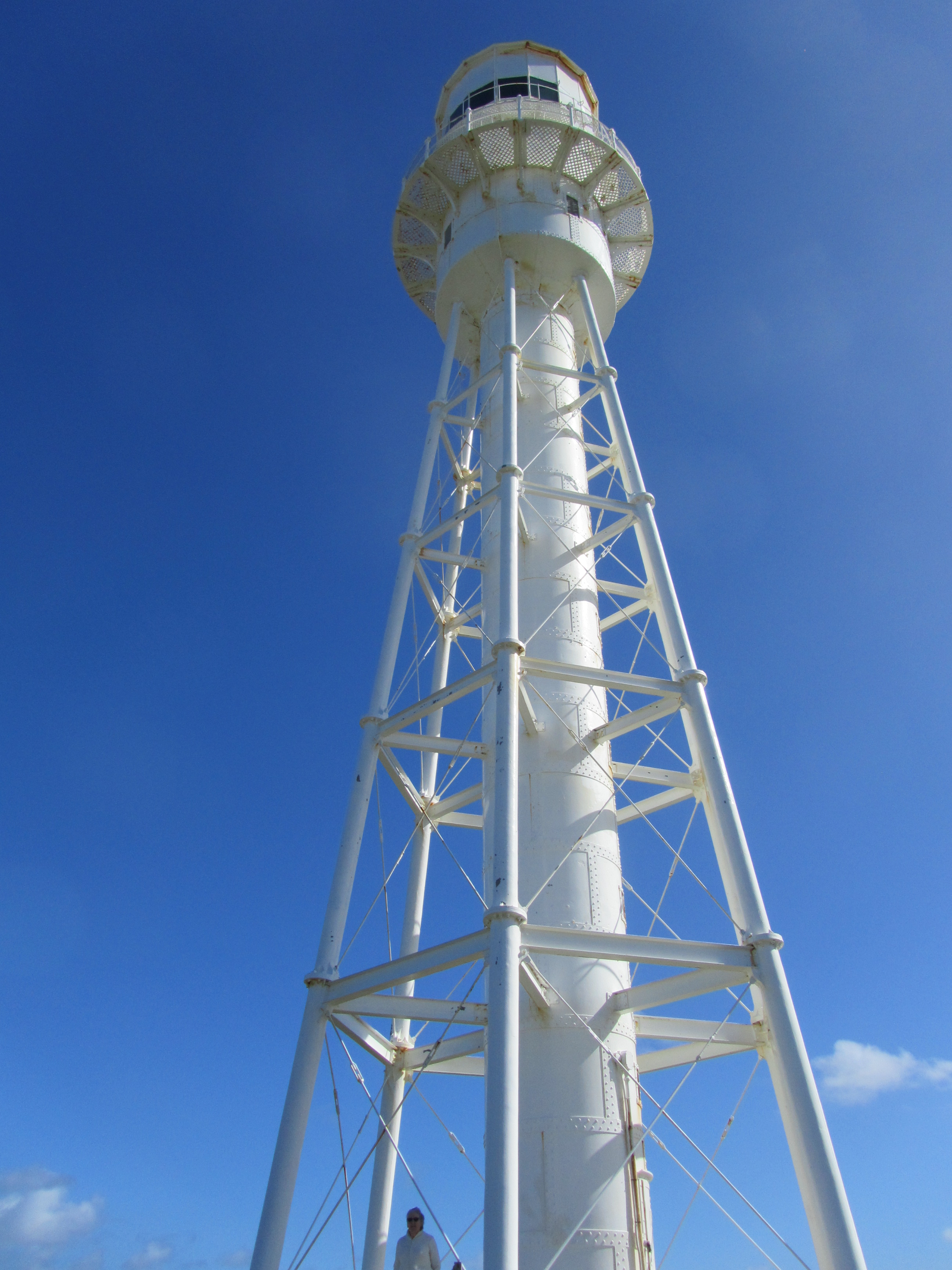
- Location: Currie; King Island; Tasmania; Australia
- Coordinates: 39°55′46.4″S 143°50′32.4″E

Tower
- Constructed: 1879
- Construction: wrought iron skeletal tower
- Height: 21 metres (69 ft)
- Shape: square pyramidal tower with central cylinder balcony and lantern
- Markings: white tower and lantern
- Power source: mains electricity
- Operator: King Island Council

Light
- Deactivated: 1989-1995
- Focal height: 46 metres (151 ft)
- Range: 22 nautical miles (41 km; 25 mi)
- Characteristic: Fl W 6.5s.

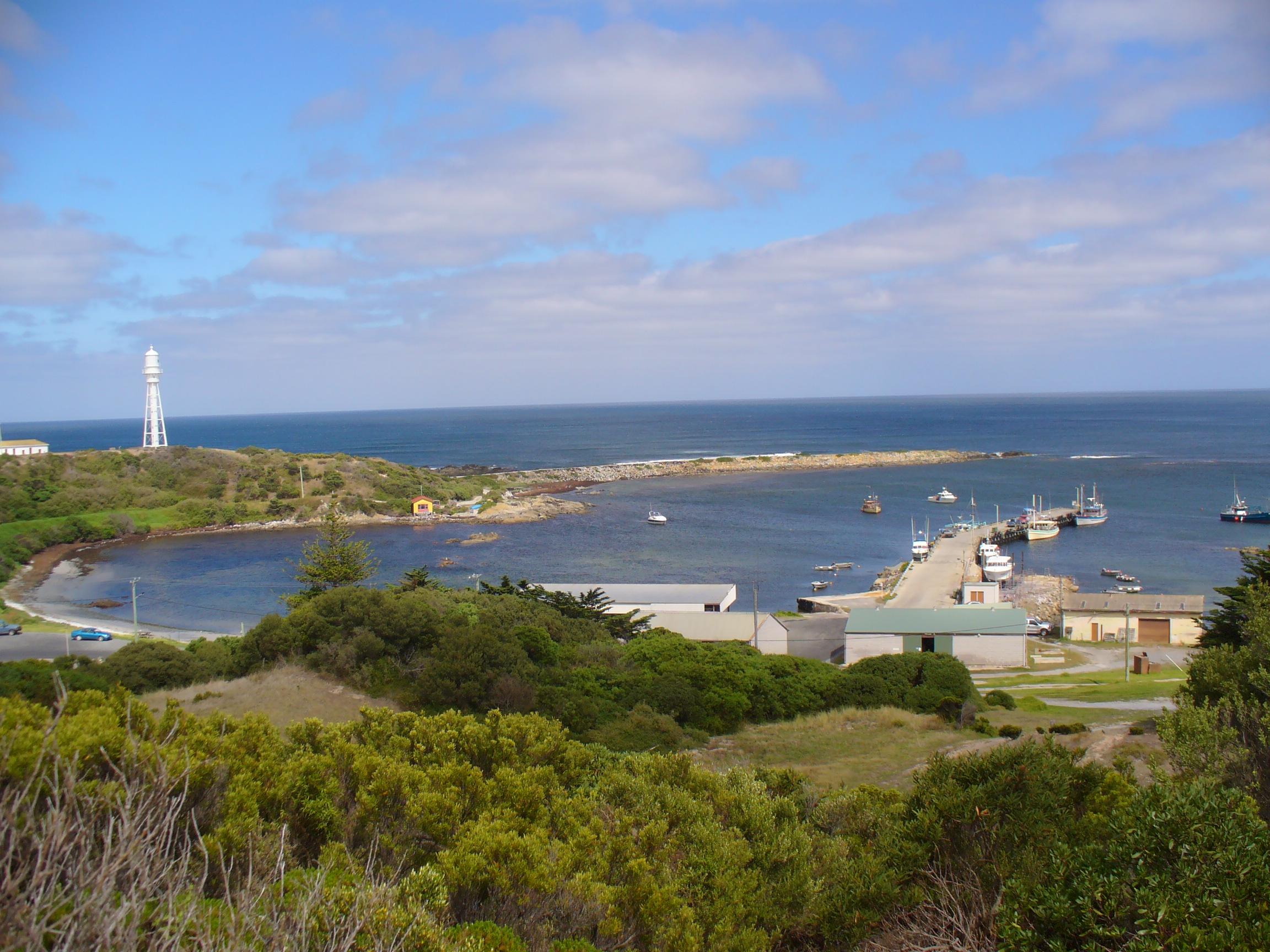
Currie harbour on King Island

Currie Lighthouse was built following agitation by Archibald Currie and others for a lighthouse at Currie Harbour, Currie, King Island, Australia in 1879. Planned and fabricated by Chance Brothers in Smethwick, England, it was devised as a 21-metre (69 ft)-tall square pyramidal truss iron tower with an iron cylinder centred inside, and then shipped to Tasmania to be erected. After an inactive period from 1989 to 1995, the light is now active again. The light characteristic is "Fl. 6 s", i.e. one flash every six seconds. The lightsource's focal plane is situated 46 metres (151 ft) above sea level. The adjacent keeper's house was turned into a museum in 1980.

== See also ==
- History of Tasmania
- List of lighthouses in Tasmania
