= Reekara =

- Town
- Coordinates: 39°45′20″S 144°02′03″E
- Country: Australia
- State: Tasmania
- Region: North-west and west
- LGA: King Island
- Location: 33 km (21 mi) NE of Currie

Government
  - State electorate: Braddon
  - Federal division: Braddon

Population
  - Total: 26 (2016 census)
- Postcode: 7256
Localities around Reekara
Southern Ocean	Yambacoona	Bass Strait
Southern Ocean	Reekara	Bass Strait
Southern Ocean	Bungaree, Sea Elephant	Bass Strait

Reekara is a rural locality in the local government area (LGA) of King Island in the North-west and west LGA region of Tasmania. The locality is about 33 kilometres (21 mi) north-east of the town of Currie. The 2016 census recorded a population of 26 for the state suburb of Reekara.

== History ==
Reekara was gazetted as a locality in 1960. It is believed to be an Aboriginal word for "a long (boat) row".

== Geography ==
The waters of the Southern Ocean form the western boundary, and Bass Strait the eastern.

== Road infrastructure ==
Route B25 (North Road) runs through from south to north.
