= Bungaree, Tasmania =

Bungaree
- Town
- Coordinates: 39°45′32″S 143°51′27″E
- Country: Australia
- State: Tasmania
- Region: North-west and west
- LGA: King Island
- Location: 26 km (16 mi) N of Currie

Government
  - State electorate: Braddon
  - Federal division: Braddon

Population
  - Total: 24 (2016 census)
- Postcode: 7256
Localities around Bungaree
Southern Ocean	Reekara	Reekara
Southern Ocean	Bungaree	Sea Elephant
Southern Ocean	Loorana	Sea Elephant

Bungaree is a rural locality in the local government area (LGA) of King Island in the North-west and west LGA region of Tasmania. The locality is about 26 kilometres (16 mi) north of the town of Currie. The 2016 census recorded a population of 24 for the state suburb of Bungaree.

== History ==
Bungaree is a confirmed locality. It is believed to be an Aboriginal word for "my country".

== Geography ==
The waters of the Southern Ocean form the western boundary.

== Road infrastructure ==
Route B25 (North Road) runs through from south to north.
