= Cape Wickham Lighthouse =

Lighthouse in Tasmania, Australia

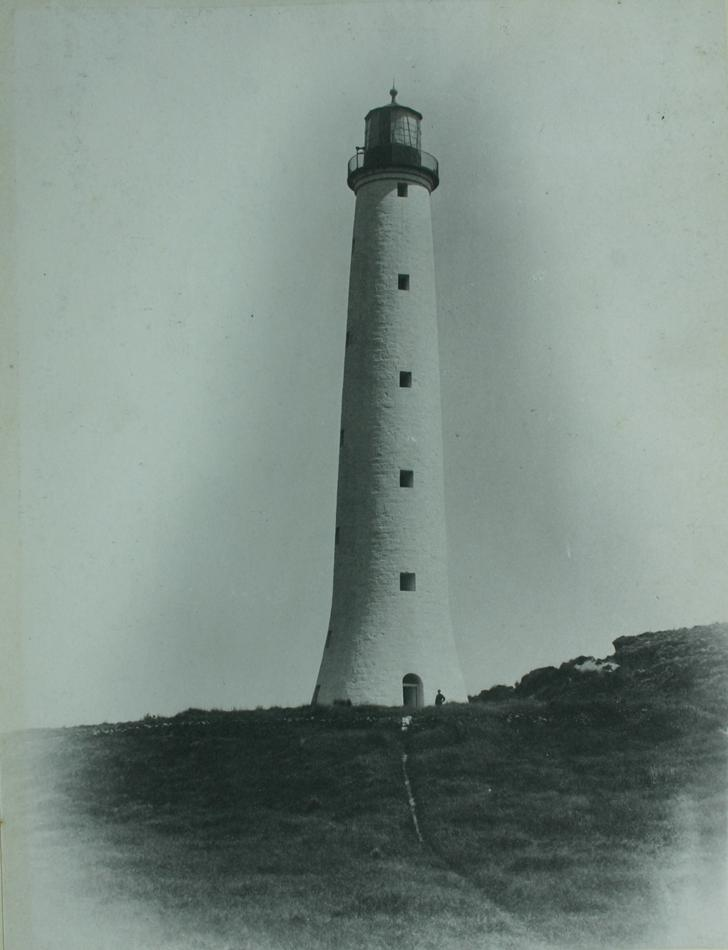
- The lighthouse in 1887
- Location: King Island; Tasmania; Australia
- Coordinates: 39°35′18.7″S 143°56′34.7″E

Tower
- Constructed: 1861
- Construction: stone tower
- Automated: 1918
- Height: 48 metres (157 ft)
- Shape: cylindrical tower with balcony and lantern
- Markings: white tower and lantern
- Operator: Australian Maritime Safety Authority
- Heritage: Commonwealth Heritage Register

Light
- Focal height: 85 metres (279 ft)
- Light source: 1,000 watts (1.3 hp); 120 electronvolts (19 aJ); Tungsten Halogen Lamp
- Intensity: 550,000 cd
- Range: 24 nautical miles (44 km; 28 mi)
- Characteristic: Fl W 10s.

The Cape Wickham Lighthouse is a lighthouse situated at Cape Wickham on King Island, Tasmania. At 48 metres (157 ft) tall, it is Australia's tallest lighthouse. The lighthouse is listed on the Commonwealth Heritage Register.

There are eleven timber flights of stairs in the lighthouse, with twenty steps each, which must be climbed in order to reach the top. Surrounding the lighthouse are the remains of a number of associated buildings, including a small church. There are also a number of gravestones, many belonging to those who were shipwrecked in the area after the lighthouse was built.

== History ==
The lighthouse was originally established in 1861, in response to the sinking of the barque Cataraqui sixteen years earlier, a disaster which had resulted in the deaths of 400 people.

While it was being constructed, some worried that the lighthouse would cause more shipwrecks than it prevented, as lighthouses usually showed the way to safety rather than warning of danger as the Cape Wickham lighthouse was designed to do. Nonetheless, the lighthouse was eventually completed, although shipwrecks frequently continued to occur until the Currie Lighthouse was completed in 1879. Built from locally quarried stone, the lighthouse was staffed by a superintendent until the light was automated in the 1920s. The superintendent often came into conflict with hunters and other established inhabitants of the island, with one 1873 report stating:

There are certain lawless men who have taken up their residence on the island who make a practice of annoying the Superintendent in every possible way, destroying his cattle, pulling down the fences and taking his hay and in fact they say they are determined to make the place too hot for him, and I much fear it will end in some serious injury to the station or perhaps to the light itself.

— from Guiding Lights by Katherine Stanley

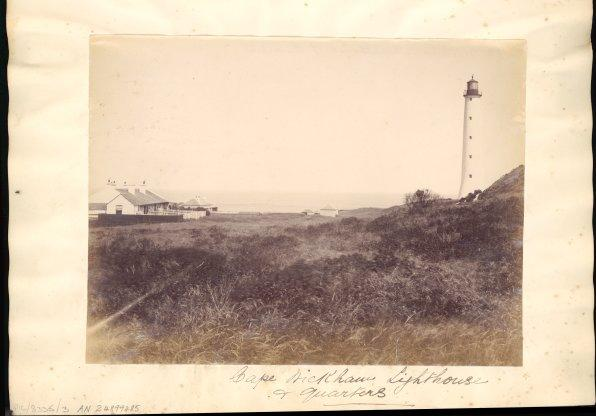
The lighthouse c. 1887. The superintendent's quarters can be seen to the left.

The superintendents were required to be extremely self-sufficient, as only one supply ship visited the site a year. Some of the lightkeepers resorted to looting and theft to supplement these supplies, with one keeper being dismissed for storing goods that his brother had looted from a shipwreck.

In the 1920s, it was determined that it was no longer necessary for the light to be staffed on a full-time basis, and automation systems were added to the lighthouse. At this time, a number of the surrounding buildings were also demolished, including the superintendent's residence. The lighthouse continued to be looked after by the lighthouse keeper from nearby Currie.

During preparations for the 150th anniversary of the lighthouse, it was discovered that it had never been officially opened. To rectify this oversight, Governor-General Quentin Bryce officially opened the lighthouse in a ceremony on 5 November 2011.

== See also ==
- History of Tasmania
- List of lighthouses in Tasmania
- List of tallest lighthouses
