= Brie =

French soft cheese

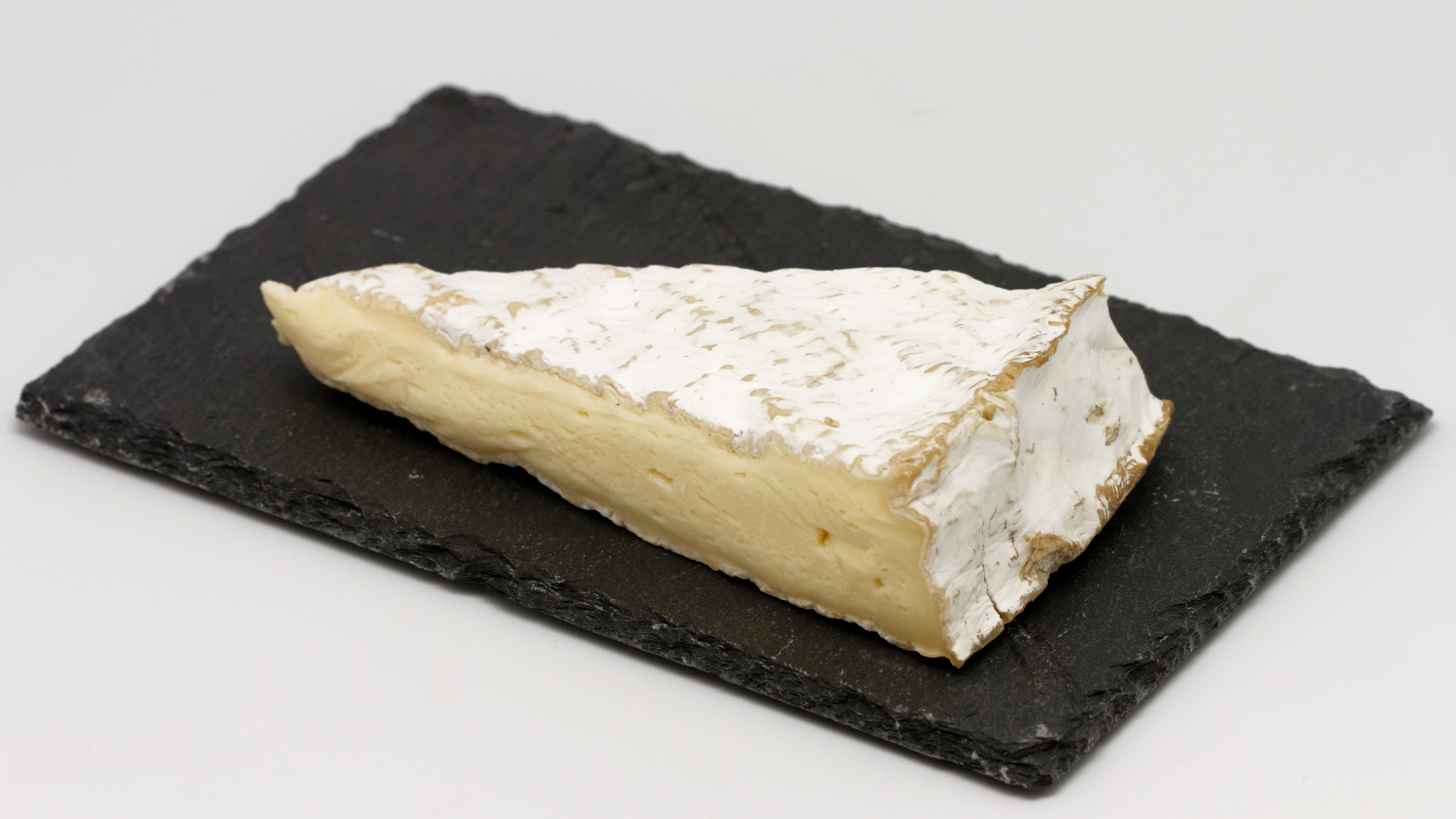
- Country of origin: France
- Region: Seine-et-Marne
- Source of milk: Cows
- Pasteurized: Required in the United States and Australia, not in most of Europe
- Texture: Soft
- Aging time: Generally 5 to 6 weeks
- Certification: AOC: 1980, for both Brie de Meaux and Brie de Melun
- Named after: Brie

Brie (/briː/ bree; French: [bʁi]) is a soft cow's-milk cheese named after Brie (itself from Gaulish briga, "hill, height"), the French region from which it originated (roughly corresponding to the modern département of Seine-et-Marne). It is pale in colour with a slight greyish tinge under a rind of white mould. The rind is typically eaten, with its flavour depending largely upon the ingredients used and its manufacturing environment. It is similar to Camembert, which is native to a different region of France. Brie typically contains between 60% and 75% butterfat, slightly higher than Camembert.

"Brie" is a style of cheese, and is not in itself a protected name, although some regional bries are protected.

Some of the flavour notes that are commonly found when eating Brie are: creamy, nutty, mushroom-like, and slightly-acidic.

== Production ==
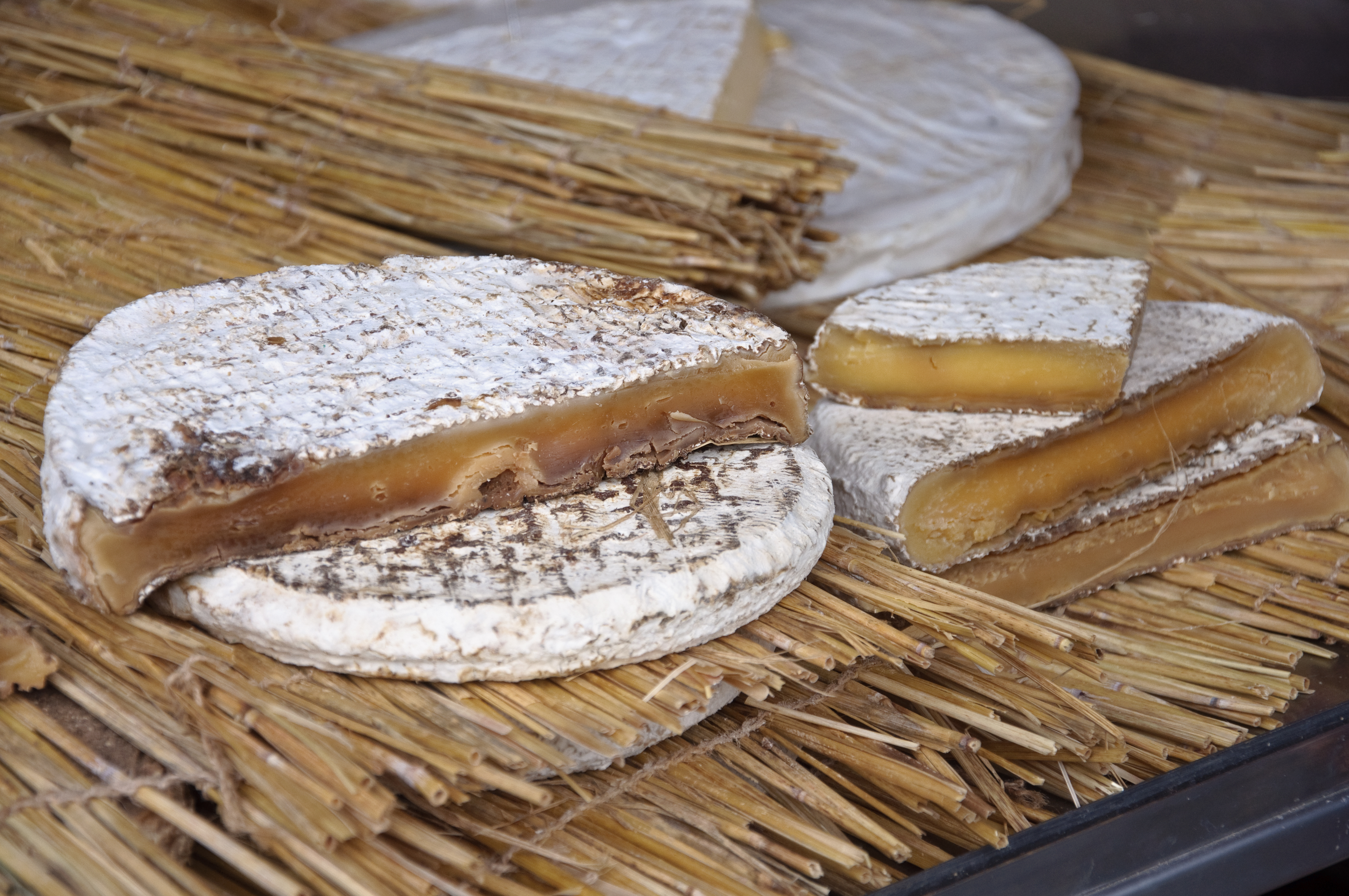
Heavily aged and very pungent Brie noir

Brie may be produced from whole or semi-skimmed milk. The curd is obtained by adding rennet to raw milk and warming it to a maximum temperature of 37 °C (99 °F). It is then cast into moulds, sometimes with a traditional perforated ladle called a pelle à brie. The 20 cm (8 in) mould is filled by successively adding thin layers, then drained for approximately 18 hours. The drained curd is taken out of the moulds, salted, inoculated with cheese culture (Penicillium camemberti or Brevibacterium linens), and aged in a controlled environment for at least four or five weeks.

If left to mature for longer, typically several months to a year, the cheese becomes stronger in flavour and taste, the pâte drier and darker, and the rind also darker and crumbly, and it is called Brie noir ('black brie').

Overripe brie contains an unpleasantly excessive amount of ammonia, produced by the same microorganisms that ripened it.

== Nutrition ==
A thirty-gram serving of brie contains about 420 kJ (100 kcal) of food energy and 8.4 g of fat, of which 5.26 g are saturated fat. Brie is a good source of protein; a serving of brie can provide 5 to 6 g of protein. Brie contains a good amount of both vitamin B_{12} and vitamin B_{2}.

== Varieties ==
There are now many varieties of brie made all over the world, including plain brie, herbed varieties, double- and triple-cream brie, and versions of brie made with other types of milk. Indeed, although brie is a French cheese, it is possible to obtain Somerset and Wisconsin brie. The French government officially certifies only two types of brie, brie de Meaux and brie de Melun. Some varieties of brie are smoked.

=== Brie de Meaux ===
Brie de Meaux is an unpasteurized round cheese with a diameter of 36–37 cm (14–15 inches), and a weight of about 2.8 kg (6 1/4 lb). Manufactured in the town of Meaux in the Brie region of northern France since the 8th century, it was originally known as the "Queen's cheese", or, after the French Revolution, the "queen of cheeses", and was eaten by all social classes. It was granted the protection of Appellation d'origine contrôlée (AOC) status in 1980. It is produced primarily in the eastern part of the Parisian basin.

=== Brie de Melun ===
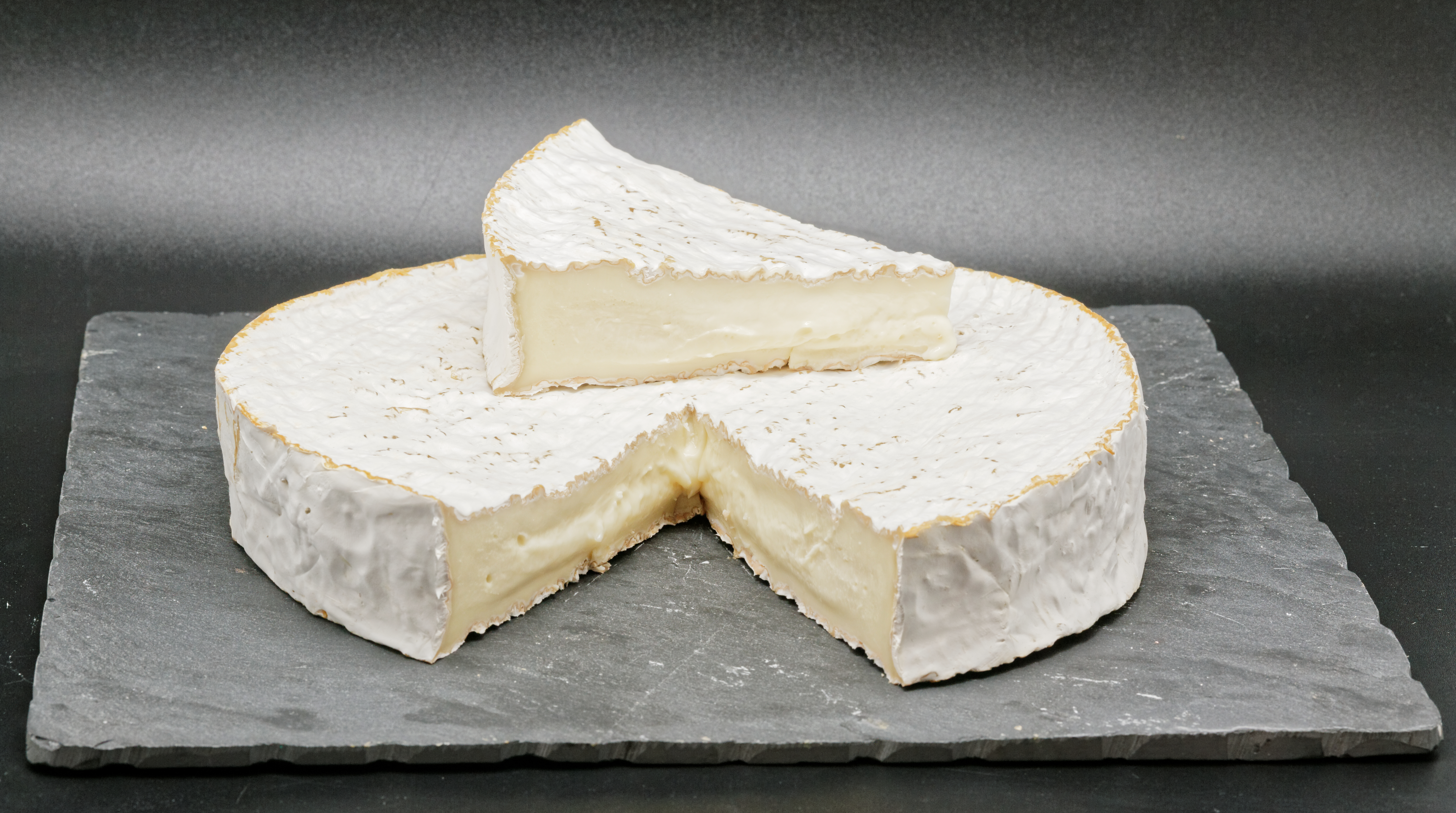
Brie de Melun

Brie de Melun has an average weight of 1.5 kg (3 1/4 lb) and a diameter of 27 cm (11 inches), smaller than Brie de Meaux. It has a stronger flavour and more pungent smell. It is made with unpasteurised milk. Brie de Melun is also available in the form of "Old Brie" or black brie. It was granted the protection of AOC status in 1980.

=== French non-AOC bries ===
The following French bries do not have AOC certification: brie de Montereau, Île-de-France, brie de Nangis, brie de Provins, brie noir, brie fermier, brie d'Isigny, brie de Melun bleu, brie petit moulé, brie laitier Coulommiers.

=== International bries ===
Australia: King Island Dairy, on King Island between Victoria and Tasmania, produces a range of cheeses sold as "brie", as does Jindi Cheese in Victoria and High Valley Mudgee Cheese Co in Mudgee, NSW.

UK: Cornish Brie; Somerset Brie; Baron Bigod (made in Suffolk); Cenarth brie (made in Wales); Morangie brie (made in the Highlands, Scotland); Connage Clava brie (made in Scotland).

US: The Marin French Cheese Company in California has made an unaged cheese since 1865 that they describe as "fresh brie".

Kolb-Lena, a Savencia Fromage & Dairy plant in Illinois, has made brie- and camembert-style cheese since early 1900. It still produces brie under the brands Alouette, Delice de France and Dorothy's.

Ireland: Ireland produces various "brie" cheeses such as Wicklow Bán brie, St. Killian brie, and The Little Milk Company's Organic Irish Brie.

New Zealand has many brie-style cheeses, varying from the Mainland brand, with Creamy, Double Cream, and Blue varieties, to craft cheesemakers such as Grinning Gecko.

== Serving ==
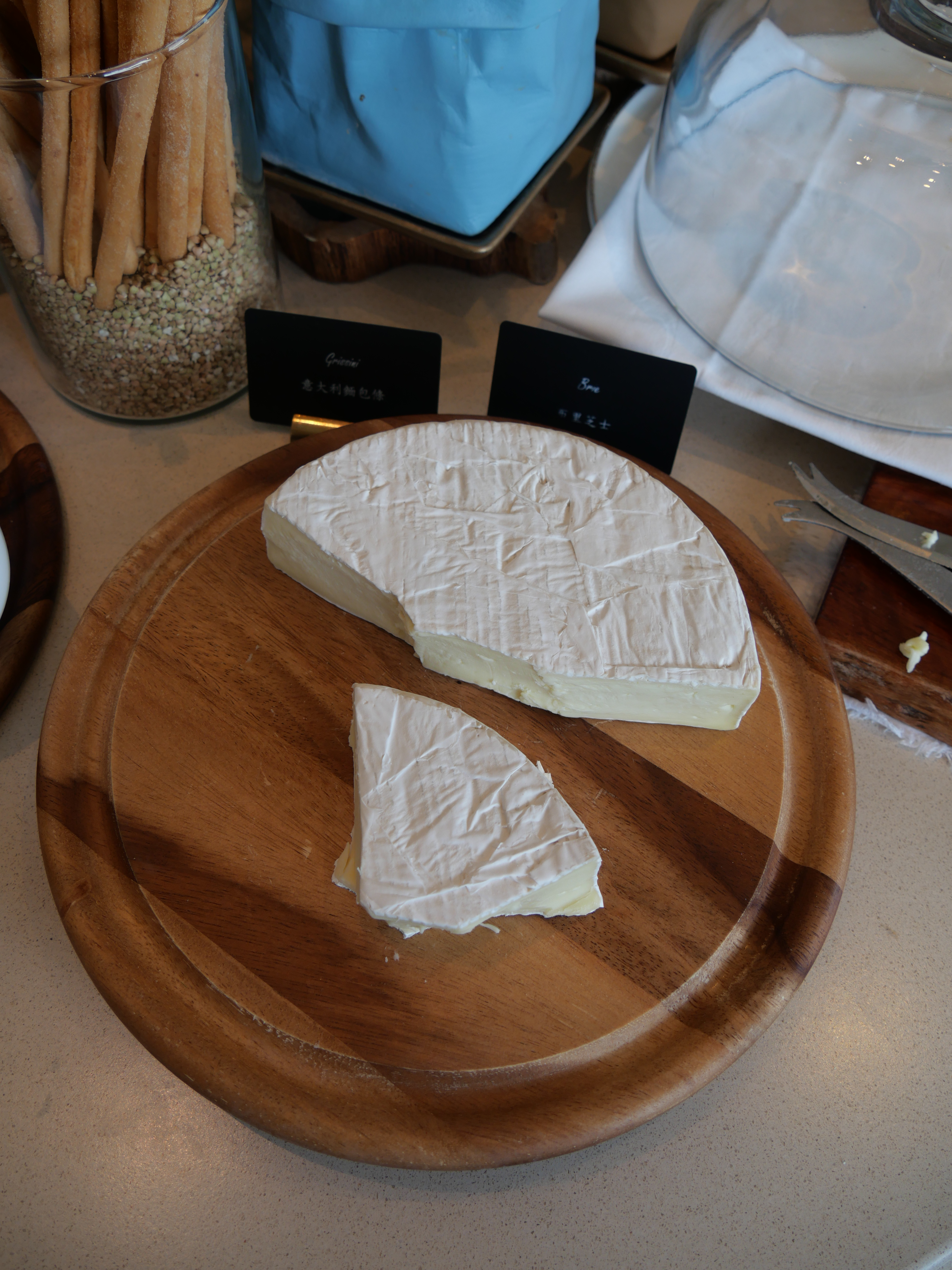
Brie on a serving board

Brie is produced as a wheel; a segment, or a whole wheel, may be bought. The white rind is edible. The cheese is ready to eat when the outside is firm, and the inside is slightly bouncy and resilient. Underripe brie is stiff to the touch; overripe brie is creamier and almost runny. The cheese is sometimes served baked.

== Storage ==
Brie is a soft cheese, which allows the rapid widespread growth of bacteria and moulds if the cheese is not stored correctly. It is recommended that soft cheeses such as brie be kept refrigerated. The optimal storage temperature for brie is 4 °C (39 °F) or even lower. The cheese should be kept in a tightly sealed container, tightly wrapped wax paper or plastic wrap to avoid contact with moisture and food-spoilage bacteria which will reduce the shelf life and freshness of the product. Cheese producers specify a "best before date", and say that the quality of the cheese will degrade beyond then. Cheese with blue or green mould may not be safe to eat; the mould may also have spread invisibly to apparently unaffected parts.

== Comparison with Camembert ==
Camembert is a similar soft cheese that is also made from cow's milk. However, there are differences such as its origin, typical market shape, size, and flavour. Brie originates from the Île-de-France while Camembert comes from Normandy. Traditionally, brie was produced in large wheels, 23 to 37 cm (9 to 14 1/2 inches) in diameter, and thus ripened more slowly than the smaller Camembert cheeses. However, they both ripen from the outside in. Brie ripens in a cellar or cave while Camembert ripens on shelves or frames. When sold, brie segments typically have been cut from the larger wheels (although some brie is sold as small, flat cylinders), and therefore its sides are not covered by the rind. By contrast, Camembert is ripened as a small round cheese 10 cm (4 inches) in diameter by about 3 cm (1 1/8 inches) thick and fully covered by rind. This ratio change between rind and paste makes Camembert slightly stronger when compared with a brie ripened for the same amount of time. Once the rind is cut on Camembert, the cheese typically has a more pungent aroma than does brie. In terms of taste, Camembert has a stronger, slightly sour, and sometimes chalky taste. The texture of Camembert is softer than that of brie, and if warmed, Camembert will become creamier, whereas brie warms without losing as much structure.

== See also ==
- Neufchâtel cheese
- List of cheeses
