= Yambacoona =

- Town
- Coordinates: 39°42′27″S 143°56′27″E
- Country: Australia
- State: Tasmania
- Region: North-west and west
- LGA: King Island
- Location: 29 km (18 mi) N of Currie

Government
  - State electorate: Braddon
  - Federal division: Braddon

Population
  - Total: 41 (SAL 2021)
- Postcode: 7256
Localities around Yambacoona
Southern Ocean	Egg Lagoon	Bass Strait
Southern Ocean	Yambacoona	Bass Strait
Southern Ocean	Reekara	Bass Strait

Yambacoona is a rural locality in the local government area (LGA) of King Island in the North-west and west LGA region of Tasmania. The locality is about 29 kilometres (18 mi) north of the town of Currie.

== History ==
Yambacoona was gazetted as a locality in 1971. It is believed to be named after a ship that brought settlers to the island in 1901. The 2016 census recorded a population of 32 for the state suburb of Yambacoona. At the 2021 census, the population had increased to 41.

== Geography ==
The waters of the Southern Ocean form the western boundary, and Bass Strait the eastern.

== Road infrastructure ==
Route B25 (North Road) runs through from south to north.
