= Naracoopa =

- Town
- Coordinates: 39°55′40″S 144°07′23″E
- Country: Australia
- State: Tasmania
- Region: King Island
- LGA: King Island
- Location: 26 km (16 mi) E of Currie

Government
  - State electorate: Braddon
  - Federal division: Braddon

Population
  - Total: 91 (2021 census)
- Postcode: 7256
Localities around Naracoopa
Pegarah	Pegarah	Bass Strait
Pegarah	Naracoopa	Bass Strait
Pegarah	Pegarah	Bass Strait

Naracoopa is a rural locality and village in the local government area of King Island on King Island in Bass Strait, north of Tasmania. It is located about 26 kilometres (16 mi) east of the town of Currie, the administrative centre for the island. The 2021 census determined a population of 91 in Naracoopa.

== History ==
The name has been in use since 1914. Naracoopa is an Aboriginal word for “good”.

== Geography ==
Bass Strait forms the eastern and north-eastern boundaries. All land boundaries are with the locality of Pegarah.

== Road infrastructure ==
The C202 route (Fraser Road / The Esplanade / Forrest Street / Millwood Road) enters from the north-west and runs through to the south before exiting. Route C203 (Pegarah Road) starts at an intersection with C202 and runs west and south until it exits.
