= William Henry Norman =

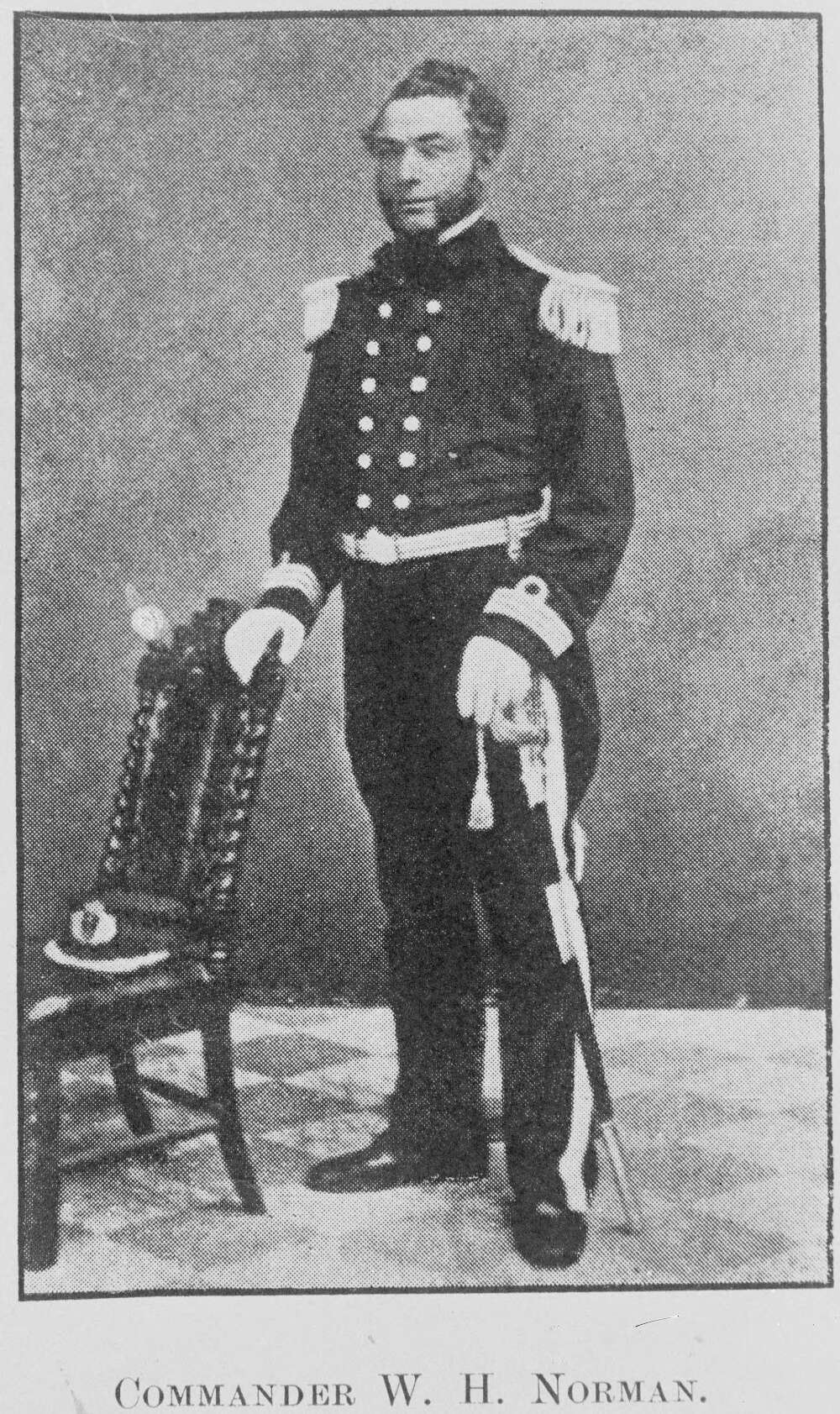
Commander William Henry Norman, circa 1851

William Henry Norman (1812–1869) was a sea captain in Australia. As commander of HMVS Victoria, he engaged in the First Taranaki War in New Zealand and the search for explorers Burke and Wills.

== Early life ==
William Henry Norman was born in March 1812 in Upnor, Kent, England. He entered the mercantile marine service and became a master mariner.

== Marine commander ==
Norman was captain of Lord Hungerford, a vessel owned by Captain Farquharson for nine years. From 1848, he was the commander of Coromandel for four years. In 1851, he joined the General Screw Steam Shipping Company where he superintended the fit-out of Lady Jocelyn which he took to Australia. On returning to England, the company appointed him to Queen of the South, which he took to Australia.

== Victorian Government service ==
One of the passengers on Queen of the South was Sir Charles Hotham, travelling to take up appointment as Governor of Victoria. A naval officer himself, Hotham was impressed with Norman and engaged his services for the new colony of Victoria. As Britain was actively at war with Russia in the Crimean War, Hotham decided that Victoria needed an armed steam sloop for its defence against Russian attack. On returning to Britain on the Queen of the South, Norman resigned his appointment with the company and commenced his engagement with the Victorian Government.

Norman's first duty was to commission the construction of the vessel, HMCSS Victoria, and then sail it to Hobson's Bay in Port Phillip, Victoria. The ship was then deployed on a series of operations under Norman's command.

=== Port Curtis rescue mission ===
The operations including sailing to Port Curtis, Queensland to rescue the Victorian gold miners who had abandoned Victoria for a new Queensland gold rush and found themselves destitute; the Victorian Government offered free passage back to Victoria where workers were urgently needed.

=== Assistance in the First Taranaki War ===
In 1860, the colonial government of Victoria decided to send Victoria to New Zealand, to support British colonists fighting in the First Taranaki War against the Māori people. On 19 April 1860, Victoria sailed to Hobart, embarked 134 troops from the 40th Regiment of Foot, and transported them to New Zealand. Prior to her departure, the colonial government passed an Act giving the ship legal status, but this law was overturned by Britain as an attempt to create a naval force independent of the Royal Navy.

After delivering the soldiers to Auckland, Victoria performed shore bombardments and coastal patrols, while maintaining supply routes between Auckland and New Plymouth.

In July, Victoria sailed to Sydney to transport General Thomas Pratt and his staff to New Zealand. Victoria was used to evacuate women and children from the town of New Plymouth, following Māori attacks on the town's fortifications. In October, the ship underwent refit in Wellington, and resumed duties by delivering British reinforcements to the combat areas. As the Victorian colonial government required the ship for urgent survey work, her return was requested at the end of the year, with Victoria arriving in Melbourne in March 1861.

The New Zealand Wars deployment was the first time an Australian warship had been deployed to assist in a foreign war.

The legal hazards of having a colonial warship operating outside her territorial limits was rectified by declaring that all Australian warships in international or foreign waters had to be commissioned into the Royal Navy.

The 12 months spent in New Zealand won Captain Norman high praise from the Governor of New Zealand, Thomas Gore Browne.

=== Burke and Wills rescue mission ===
On returning to Victoria, a few months later there was news that the Burke and Wills expedition commissioned by the Royal Society of Victoria to find an overland route from south to north of Australia were at the Gulf of Carpentaria without the means to support life. Norman and HMCS Victoria, together with other vessels, were immediately dispatched to take a search-and-rescue party to the Gulf to locate and assist Burke and Wills. While waiting in the Gulf for the search team to return, Norman undertook hydrological surveys of the Gulf and Torres Strait (an area notorious for its reefs).

=== Rescue of Netherby ===
On 14 July 1866, the ship Netherby carrying immigrants to Queensland was wrecked off King Island in Bass Strait and all the 413 passengers and 49 crew made it onshore safely, but there they were without shelter and with very limited provisions. The second officer, John Parry, led a party of crew and passengers to procure assistance from the lighthouse on the island, but there were insufficient supplies there for the number of survivors. Parry and 3 others took the 23-foot whaleboat at the lighthouse and, despite high winds and rough seas, managed to reach the Australian mainland between Point Roadknight and Barwon Heads, where they met a party of surveyors who immediately assisted them. Parry then took a horse and rode the 26 miles to Geelong from where he raised the alarm by telegram to Melbourne on 21 July. The Victorian Government immediately summoned Captain Norman to load supplies of food, blankets, tents and medicine onto Victoria and then proceed at full speed to King Island to rescue the survivors; John Parry (who had travelled to Melbourne by train from Geelong) joined the ship to help locate the survivors. Another ship, Pharos, had also independently sailed from Williamstown to render assistance to the survivors. On Monday 23 July, Norman located the wreck of Netherby and, after discussions with Netherby's Captain Owens took 230 passengers on board Victoria (as many as was possible), while off-loading supplies for those remaining on the island. Then Pharos arrived and took on board the remaining 60 survivors near the wreck site, the other 117 survivors having left the wreck site heading to the lighthouse. Having taken the rescued people to Melbourne, Victoria and Pharos returned to the lighthouse at King Island where they rescued the remaining survivors and replaced the lost whaleboat at the lighthouse. The survivors were taken by train and then by cab (a free service by the cabmen) to be accommodated in the Immigration Depot and Exhibition Building (not the present Royal Exhibition Building). Little of the luggage of the survivors was recovered and most were in a wretched state after their ordeal; the Victorian public donated clothing and funds to assist the survivors, many of whom decided to settle in Victoria rather than undertake another sea voyage to Queensland.

=== Introduction of salmon in Tasmania ===
Another mission involved Norman delivering a cargo of salmon eggs to Tasmania on Victoria to introduce salmon to Tasmania.

=== Commissioning of Cerberus ===
In about 1858, the British Government gave the Victorian Government the ironclad HMVS Cerberus. Norman was dispatched to England to supervise the fit-out and then bring the ship back to Victoria.

== Later life ==
On returning to England to fit-out Cerberus, Norman's health deteriorated. He died on 12 December 1869 in Ramsgate, Kent, England from diseases of the heart and lung and then dropsy. He was attended in his illness by his sister Jane, his wife and children being in Williamstown, Victoria.

== Legacy ==
The Norman River and town of Normanton, both in Queensland, are named after him.
