= Egg Lagoon, Tasmania =

Egg Lagoon
- Town
- Coordinates: 39°39′17″S 143°58′42″E
- Country: Australia
- State: Tasmania
- Region: North-west and west
- LGA: King Island
- Location: 36 km (22 mi) N of Currie

Government
  - State electorate: Braddon
  - Federal division: Braddon

Population
  - Total: 24 (2016 census)
- Postcode: 7256
Localities around Egg Lagoon
Wickham	Wickham	Bass Strait
Southern Ocean	Egg Lagoon	Bass Strait
Yambacoona	Yambacoona	Bass Strait

Egg Lagoon is a rural locality in the local government area (LGA) of King Island in the North-west and west LGA region of Tasmania. The locality is about 36 kilometres (22 mi) north of the town of Currie. The 2016 census recorded a population of 24 for the state suburb of Egg Lagoon.

== History ==
Egg Lagoon was gazetted as a locality in 1971. The name is believed to come from the finding of a large number of goose eggs in the area.

== Geography ==
The waters of the Southern Ocean form the western boundary, and those of Bass Strait the eastern.

== Road infrastructure ==
Route B25 (North Road) runs through from south to north.
