= HMVS Victoria (1855) =

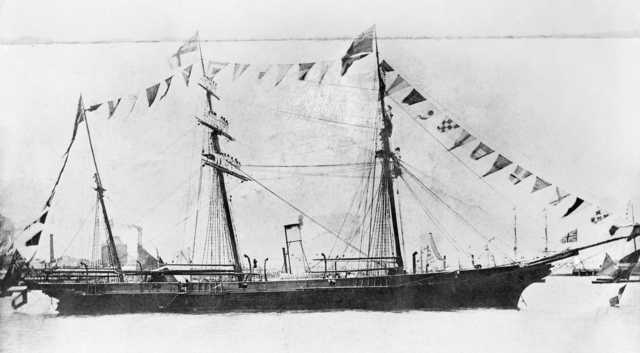
- Her Majesty's Colonial Steam Sloop Victoria, dressed for the visit of Prince Alfred, Duke of Edinburgh in 1867

History

Victoria
- Launched: 30 June 1855
- Acquired: 31 May 1856
- Decommissioned: 1880
- Home port: Melbourne, Victoria
- Fate: Sold into civilian service

General characteristics
- Type: Sloop-of-war
- Propulsion: Combined steam/sail
- Armament: In 1856: 1 × 9 ft 6 ins pivot gun; 2 × 6 feet 25 cwt 32-pounder guns; In 1867: 4 × 32-pounder guns; 1 × 40-pounder Armstrong BL pivot gun; 2 × 12-pounder brass field gun

HMVS Victoria (Her Majesty's Victorian Ship; also referred to with the prefix HMCSS-Her Majesty's Colonial Steam Sloop) was a 580-ton combined steam/sail sloop-of-war built in England in the 1850s for the colony of Victoria, Australia.

She was the second warship to be built for an Australian colonial navy, the first British-built ship given to a colony of the British Empire, and the first Australian warship to be deployed overseas when she supported New Zealand colonists during the First Taranaki War.

== Construction and acquisition ==
Victoria was the first warship to be built in England for one of the British colonies. She was the second ship ordered for an Australian colonial navy, after the Australian-built gunboat Spitfire for the New South Wales colony. She was designed by the British naval architect Oliver Lang and launched in London on 30 June 1855 by Lady Constance Talbot.

Commander William Henry Norman sailed Victoria from Plymouth to Hobsons Bay, arriving on 31 May 1856. The ship was initially equipped with three 32-pounder guns.

== Operational history ==
Victoria's main duties were to protect the colony of Victoria, conduct hydrological surveys, recover passengers and crew from stricken ships, and serve as a lighthouse tender. During her career the sloop delivered the first trout eggs to the colony of Tasmania.

=== New Zealand Wars deployment, 1860 ===
In 1860, the colonial government of Victoria decided to send the sloop to New Zealand, to support British colonists fighting in the First Taranaki War. On 19 April 1860, Victoria sailed to Hobart, embarked 134 troops from the 40th Regiment of Foot, and transported them to New Zealand. Prior to her departure, the colonial government passed an Act giving the ship legal status, but this law was overturned by Britain as an attempt to create a naval force independent of the Royal Navy.

After delivering the soldiers to Auckland, Victoria performed shore bombardments and coastal patrols, while maintaining supply routes between Auckland and New Plymouth.

In July, she sailed to Sydney to transport General Thomas Pratt and his staff to New Zealand. Victoria was used to evacuate women and children from the town of New Plymouth, following Maori attacks on the town's fortifications. In October, the ship underwent refit in Wellington, and resumed duties by delivering British reinforcements to the combat areas. As the Victorian colonial government required the ship for urgent survey work, her return was requested at the end of the year, with Victoria arriving in Melbourne in March 1861.

The New Zealand Wars deployment was the first time an Australian warship had been deployed to assist in a foreign war. The legal hazards of having a colonial warship operating outside her territorial limits was rectified by declaring that all Australian warships in international or foreign waters had to be commissioned into the Royal Navy.

=== Search for Burke and Wills, 1861-2 ===
When news reached Melbourne in July 1861 that the explorers Burke and Wills were missing somewhere between Cooper Creek and the Gulf of Carpentaria, the Royal Society of Victoria decided to send a number of search parties to search for them. Commander William Henry Norman sailed from Hobson's Bay in Victoria on 4 August 1861 for Brisbane, where William Landsborough and the Queensland Relief Expedition boarded. Accompanied by Firefly (188 tons, built 1843), Victoria departed Brisbane on 24 August 1861, arriving at the Albert River in the Gulf of Carpentaria at the end of September 1861. Also aboard was the botanist Diedrich Henne. On 29 September, the party formed a land base on Sweers Island, and also visited Bentinck Island, both part of the South Wellesley Islands.

After finding traces of the explorers, they returned to Melbourne on 31 March 1862.

=== Rescue of Netherby ===
On 14 July 1866, Netherby, carrying immigrants to Queensland, was wrecked off King Island in Bass Strait and all 413 passengers and 49 crew made it onshore safely, but there they were without shelter and with very limited provisions. The second officer, John Parry, led a party of crew and passengers to procure assistance from the lighthouse on the island, but there were insufficient supplies there for the number of survivors. Parry and three others took the 23-foot whaleboat at the lighthouse and, despite high winds and rough seas, managed to reach the Australian mainland between Point Roadknight and Barwon Heads, where they met a party of surveyors who immediately assisted them. Parry then took a horse and rode the 26 miles to Geelong from where he raised the alarm by telegram to Melbourne on 21 July. The Victorian Government immediately summoned Captain Norman to load supplies of food, blankets, tents and medicine onto Victoria and then proceed at full speed to King Island to rescue the survivors; Parry (who had travelled to Melbourne by train from Geelong) joined the ship to help locate the survivors. Another ship, Pharos, had also independently sailed from Williamstown to render assistance to the survivors. On Monday 23 July, Norman located Netherby and, after discussions with Netherby's Captain Owens, took 230 passengers on board Victoria (as many as was possible), while off-loading supplies for those remaining on the island. Then Pharos arrived and took on board the remaining 60 survivors near the wreck site, the other 117 survivors having left the wreck site heading to the lighthouse. Having taken the rescued people to Melbourne, Victoria and Pharos returned to the lighthouse at King Island where they rescued the remaining survivors and replaced the lost whaleboat at the lighthouse. The survivors were taken by train and then by cab (a free service by the cabmen) to be accommodated in the Immigration Depot and Exhibition Building (not the present Royal Exhibition Building). Little of the luggage of the survivors was recovered and most were in a wretched state after their ordeal; the Victorian public donated clothing and funds to assist the survivors, many of whom decided to settle in Victoria rather than undertake another sea voyage to Queensland.

=== 1862 onwards ===
In 1867, Victoria was present for the visit of Prince Alfred, Duke of Edinburgh—the first member of the British royal family to visit Australia.

By 1877, Victoria's armament had been altered to include one 10-inch gun, two 13-pounders, and two 3-pounders.

== Decommissioning and fate ==
The ship ended naval service in 1882. It was then purchased by the colony of Western Australia in 1894, but laid up a few years later in 1897, and then finally scrapped in Sydney 1920.
