= Surprise Bay =

- Town
- Coordinates: 40°06′48″S 143°55′30″E
- Country: Australia
- State: Tasmania
- Region: North-west and west
- LGA: King Island
- Location: 28 km (17 mi) S of Currie

Government
  - State electorate: Braddon
  - Federal division: Braddon

Population
  - Total: 4 (SAL 2021)
- Postcode: 7256
Localities around Surprise Bay
| Pearshape | Pearshape, Lymwood | Lymwood |
| Southern Ocean | Surprise Bay | Bass Strait, Lymwood |
| Southern Ocean | Bass Strait | Bass Strait |

Surprise Bay is a rural locality in the local government area (LGA) of King Island in the north-west and west LGA region of Tasmania. The locality is about 28 kilometres (17 mi) south of the town of Currie. The 2021 census recorded a population of 4 for the state suburb of Surprise Bay, up from zero in 2016.

== History ==
Surprise Bay is a confirmed locality.

== Geography ==
The waters of the Southern Ocean form the south-western boundary, and those of Bass Strait the south-eastern.

=== Climate ===
Surprise Bay has a temperate oceanic climate (Köppen: Cfb), bordering on a warm Mediterranean climate (Csb).

Climate data for Surprise Bay
| Month | Jan | Feb | Mar | Apr | May | Jun | Jul | Aug | Sep | Oct | Nov | Dec | Year |
|---|---|---|---|---|---|---|---|---|---|---|---|---|---|
| Average rainfall mm (inches) | 31.3 (1.23) | 40.2 (1.58) | 51.9 (2.04) | 60.6 (2.39) | 100.7 (3.96) | 102.1 (4.02) | 123.0 (4.84) | 107.5 (4.23) | 86.6 (3.41) | 71.9 (2.83) | 55.8 (2.20) | 55.1 (2.17) | 889.3 (35.01) |
Source: Bureau of Meteorology (Climate Data Online)

== Road infrastructure ==
An un-numbered route (South Road) provides access to the locality.
