= Sea Elephant, Tasmania =

Sea Elephant
- Town
- Coordinates: 39°49′42″S 144°03′56″E
- Country: Australia
- State: Tasmania
- Region: North-west and west
- LGA: King Island
- Location: 25 km (16 mi) NE of Currie

Government
  - State electorate: Braddon
  - Federal division: Braddon

Population
  - Total: nil (2016 census)
- Postcode: 7256
Localities around Sea Elephant
Reekara	Reekara	Bass Strait
Loorana, Bungaree	Sea Elephant	Bass Strait
Pegarah	Pegarah	Bass Strait

Sea Elephant is a rural locality in the local government area (LGA) of King Island in the North-west and west LGA region of Tasmania. The locality is about 25 kilometres (16 mi) north-east of the town of Currie. The 2016 census recorded a population of nil for the state suburb of Sea Elephant.

== History ==
Sea Elephant was gazetted as a locality in 1971.

== Geography ==
The waters of Bass Strait form the eastern boundary.

== Road infrastructure ==
Route C202 (Fraser Road) passes to the south. From there, Ridges Road and Sea Elephant Road provide access to the locality.
