= New Year Island (Tasmania) =

Island in Tasmania, Australia

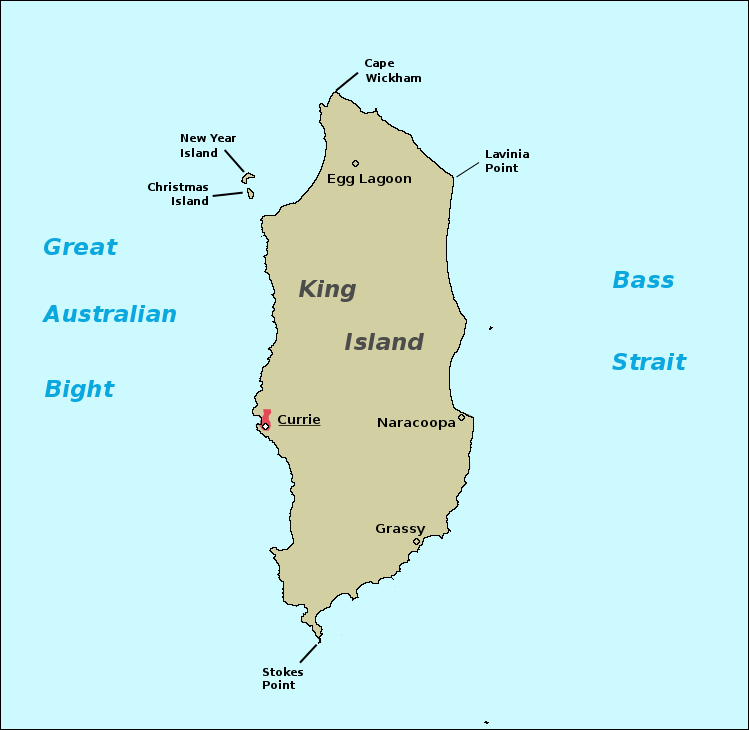
- New Year Island, located top left, relative to King Island

- Location within Tasmania

Geography
- Location: Roaring Forties, Great Australian Bight
- Coordinates: 39°40′12″S 143°49′12″E
- Archipelago: New Year Group
- Total islands: 5
- Major islands: King Island
- Area: 98.22 ha (242.7 acres)

Administration
- Australia
- State: Tasmania
- LGA: Municipality of King Island

New Year Island, part of the New Year Group, is a 98.22-hectare (242.7-acre) granite island and game reserve located in the Great Australian Bight, lying off the north-west coast of Tasmania, Australia.

== New Year Group ==
There are four islands in the New Year Group. Besides New Year Island, these are:

- King Island,
- Christmas Island and
- Councillor Island.

While King Island has the largest area of the four islands, the group is named after New Year Island because it was discovered by Europeans a few days earlier than King Island.

== Fauna ==
Breeding seabird and shorebird species include short-tailed shearwater, fairy prion, Pacific gull, silver gull and sooty oystercatcher. Reptiles include tiger snake, white's skink, metallic skink and eastern blue-tongued lizard. A species of mouse is present.

The island forms part of the King Island Important Bird Area because of its importance for breeding seabirds and waders.

== Geography ==
According to the International Hydrographic Organization, the line separating the Bass Strait from the Great Australian Bight runs through King Island, so New Year Island lies in the Great Australian Bight.

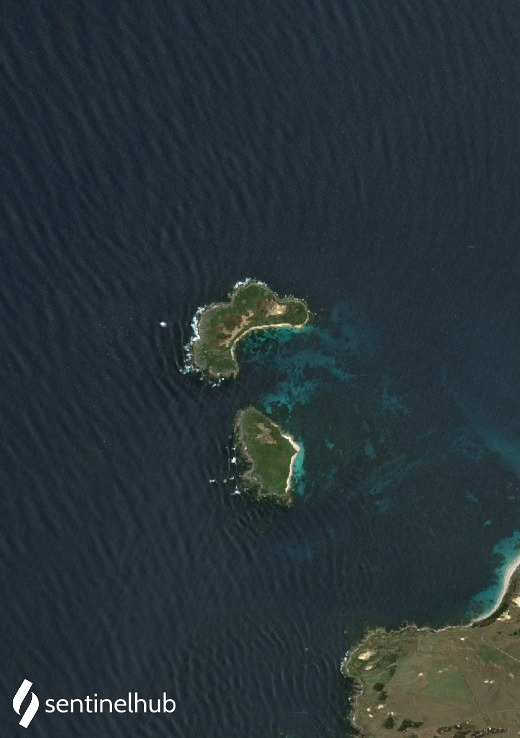
New Year Island (centre, north), Christmas Island (centre, south) and King Island (bottom-right)

== See also ==
- List of islands of Tasmania
