= Councillor Island =

Island in Tasmania, Australia

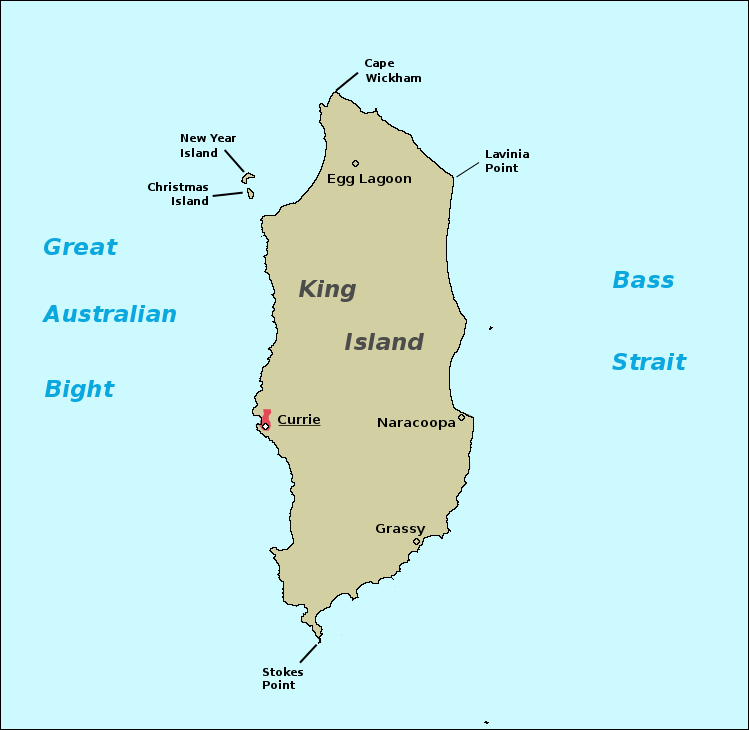
- Councillor Island, located right, relative to King Island

- Location within Tasmania

Geography
- Location: Bass Strait
- Coordinates: 39°49′48″S 144°09′36″E
- Archipelago: New Year Group
- Area: 10.53 ha (26.0 acres)

Administration
- Australia
- State: Tasmania
- LGA: Municipality of King Island

Councillor Island, part of the New Year Group, is a 10.53-hectare (26.0-acre) granite island located in the Bass Strait, lying off the north-west coast of Tasmania, Australia.

== New Year Group ==
There are four islands in the New Year Group. Besides Councillor Island, these are:

- King Island,
- New Year Island and
- Christmas Island.

While King Island has the largest area of the four islands, the group is named after New Year Island because it was discovered by Europeans a few days earlier than King Island.

== Fauna ==
Breeding seabird and shorebird species include little penguin, short-tailed shearwater, fairy prion, common diving-petrel, Pacific gull, silver gull, sooty oystercatcher, black-faced cormorant and Caspian tern. Reptiles include eastern blue-tongued lizard.

The island forms part of the King Island Important Bird Area because of its importance for breeding seabirds and waders.

== See also ==
- List of islands of Tasmania
