= Pegarah =

- Town
- Coordinates: 39°55′26″S 144°06′18″E
- Country: Australia
- State: Tasmania
- Region: King Island
- LGA: King Island
- Location: 24 km (15 mi) E of Currie

Government
  - State electorate: Braddon
  - Federal division: Braddon

Population
  - Total: 134 (2016 census)
- Postcode: 7256
Localities around Pegarah
Loorana	Sea Elephant	Bass Strait
Nugara	Pegarah	Bass Strait, Naracoopa
Nugara	Yarra Creek, Lymwood	Bass Strait

Pegarah is a rural locality in the local government area of King Island on King Island in Bass Strait, north of Tasmania. It is located about 24 kilometres (15 mi) east of the town of Currie, the administrative centre for the island. The 2016 census determined a population of 134 for the state suburb of Pegarah.

== History ==
The name was used for a parish from about 1895, and the locality was gazetted in 1971. Pegarah is an Aboriginal word for "ripe".

== Geography ==
Bass Strait forms the eastern boundary, except for the enclosed locality of Naracoopa.

== Road infrastructure ==
The C202 route enters from the north-west as Fraser Road and runs to the east before turning south where it passes through Naracoopa and continues south as Millwood Road before exiting. Route B25 (Grassy Road) enters from the west and runs east to the village of Pegarah, where it turns south-east and south until it exits. Route C203 (Pegarah Road) starts at an intersection with B25 in the village and runs east to Naracoopa.
