= Lord Hungerford (1814 ship) =

British ship

History

United Kingdom
- Name: Lord Hungerford
- Namesake: Walter Hungerford, 1st Baron Hungerford
- Builder: R. Kyd and W. Richardson, Kidderpore, Calcutta
- Launched: 31 October 1814
- Fate: Foundered on 1 June 1861

General characteristics
- Tons burthen: Old Act: 679, or 685, or 707, 70734/94, or 736 (bm); New Act (post 1836): 928 (bm)
- Length: 135 ft 6 in (41.3 m)
- Beam: 34 ft 10 in (10.6 m)
- Notes: Teak-built; sheathed in Yellow Metal (Muntz metal) in 1851 & 1854

Lord Hungerford was launched at Calcutta in 1814. Her most notable voyages were one transporting convicts to Van Diemen's Land and two for the British East India Company. Later she brought laborers to British Guiana and immigrants to Victoria and South Australia. She foundered on 1 June 1861, on her way to Valparaiso to be converted to a coal hulk.

== Career ==
Origins: Lord Hungerford was built at Calcutta and cost sicca rupees 195,000 to construct.

She first appeared in Lloyd's Register (LR) for 1816, with J.Napier, master and owner, and trade London–India.

On 10 October 1816, Lord Hungerford was proceeding down the Hooghly River from Calcutta to complete her loading at the New Anchorage (near Diamond Harbour and Kedgeree), for the journey back to England. Fires twice broke out as she was passing Fulta. The first fire was easily put out. The second came out of the main hold and was more serious. The crew steered her to run her aground, but was able to put it out first, and she continued on her way. The suspicion was that the source of the fires was arson by the lascars as they had stood by and refused to help fight the fire. A new crew of lascars was going to be taken on and the existing lascars were going to be turned over to the police.

Year	Master	Owner	Trade	Source
1820	J.Napier	Capt. & Co.	London–India	LR
1821	J.Napier; O'Brien	Capt. & Co.	London–India; London–New South Wales	LR

Convict voyage to Van Diemen's Land (1821): Captain Michael O'Brien sailed from Gravesend on 22 June. However, on 29 June, at Deal, Lord Hungerford and Caroline, Campbell, master, bound to New Brunswick, ran foul of each other. Caroline lost her bowsprit and had to put back to the Downs.

Lord Hungerford sailed from England in July 1821. She sailed via Madeira and arrived a Hobart on 26 December. She had embarked 228 convicts and she landed 228. The guard came from the 67th Regiment of Foot. From Hobart she sailed to Sydney, arriving on 1 February 1826, and then on to Madras and to Bengal.

Year	Master	Owner	Trade	Source
1825	Farquharson	Heathorn	London–Calcutta	LR
1826	J.Talbert	Heathorn	London–Calcutta	LR

1st EIC voyage (1825): Captain James Talbert sailed from the Downs on 4 July 1825, bound for Calcutta. She had sailed from Deal some days before but on 29 June, off Dover had run foul of Caroline, Campbell, master, which had had to return to the Downs. Lord Hungerford reached Kedgeree on 12 November, and arrived at Calcutta on 21 November.

2nd EIC voyage (1827-1828): Captain William Heathorn sailed from the Downs on 16 April 1827, bound for China. Lord Hungerford arrived at Whampoa Anchorage on 4 September. Homeward bound, she crossed the Second Bar on 22 October, reached Saint Helena on 12 January 1828, and arrived back at the Downs on 10 March.

Year	Master	Owner	Trade	Source
1830	Heathorn	Heathorn	London–China	LR
1835				
1840	Saunders	Farquharson	London–Calcutta	LR
1845	Pigott	Farquharson	London–Calcutta	LR; damages repaired 1843

Labour transport to British Guiana (1845 & 1847): On 26 January 1845, Lord Hungerford, Captain W.H.Norman, left Calcutta bearing the first Indian labourers to British Guiana after the lifting of the c.1839 embargo on the importation of Indian laborers. She arrived on 4 May 1845, and landed 352 coolies at Georgetown, ten having died on the voyage (a mortality rate of 2.8%). She landed another 341 on 12 May 1848.

On 25 October 1848 Lord Hungerford, Captain Patterson, sailed for Australia. On 10 February 1849, she arrived at Port Phillip where she landed 179 immigrants.

Year	Master	Owner	Trade	Source
1851	Patterson; Brown	Farquharson	London–Sydney; Liverpool–Bombay	LR; small repairs 1851
1855	Hurst	Teighe & Co.	London	LR; small repairs 1847, 1848, & 1851

On 1 December 1854, "Lord Hungerford", under Captain J.W. Hurst, sailed for Australia from Plymouth. On 20 March 1855, she arrived in Sydney.

On 2 August 1856, Captain J.W.Hurst sailed from Plymouth. Lord Hungerford arrived at Port Adelaide on 28 November 1856. There she landed 299 immigrants, having had eight births and nine deaths on the voyage.

Year	Master	Owner	Trade	Source
1860	Hurst	Teighe & Co.		LR
1865	Hurst	Teighe & Co.		LR

== Fate ==
The Pacific Steam Navigation Company purchased Lord Hungerford to use her as a coal hulk at Valparaiso. However, she foundered on the way. (Note: There is an incorrect report that in 1867 Lord Hungerford was sold for use as a hulk.)

On 12 February 1861, Lord Hungerford was at St. Mary's, Isles of Scilly when three apprentices from her refused to reboard, arguing that she was unsafe, and that there were irregularities in their articles of service. Magistrates heard the complaints but ruled against the apprentices. When the apprentices nevertheless refused to board Lord Hungerford, the constables declined to enforce the order, especially in the face of physical opposition by some local women, and a riot of sorts ensued. Military from a local garrison were called out and the Riot Act was read. In a subsequent search of the island the three apprentices were not to be found.

On 21 February Lord Hungerford was still at St Mary's when a gale drove her aground.

In March, in trials at St Mary's a seaman from Lord Hungerford received a sentence of 12 weeks hard labor for having assaulted Captain Cooper. A constable received a fine of £9 for failing to do his duty, and another man was fined 30 shillings for having obstructed the constables in their duty.

Lord Hungerford foundered on 1 June 1861. Her crew were rescued.

The crew arrived at Valparaiso on the French ship Samarang.
