= Dolphin mine =

Tungsten mine in Tasmania, Australia

- Location within Tasmania
- Location: King Island, Tasmania, Australia; 40°03′15″S 144°03′41″E
- Products: Tungsten
- Website: http://www.kingislandscheelite.com.au/

The Dolphin mine is a large open pit and underground mine located in the Bass Strait on King Island, Tasmania, Australia. Dolphin represents one of the largest tungsten reserves in Australia having estimated reserves of 2.7 million tonnes of ore grading 1.04% tungsten. Activity at the mine is often tied to periods of war.

== See also ==
- List of mines in Australia
- Mining in Australia
