= Nugara =

- Town
- Coordinates: 39°55′49″S 143°53′30″E
- Country: Australia
- State: Tasmania
- Region: North-west and west
- LGA: King Island
- Location: 5 km (3.1 mi) E of Currie

Government
  - State electorate: Braddon
  - Federal division: Braddon

Population
  - Total: 81 (2016 census)
- Postcode: 7256
Localities around Nugara
Loorana	Loorana	Loorana
Southern Ocean, Currie	Nugara	Pegarah, Lymwood
Southern Ocean	Pearshape	Lymwood

Nugara is a rural locality in the local government area (LGA) of King Island in the North-west and west LGA region of Tasmania. The locality is about 5 kilometres (3.1 mi) east of the town of Currie. The 2016 census recorded a population of 81 for the state suburb of Nugara.

== History ==
Nugara is a confirmed locality.

== Geography ==
The waters of the Southern Ocean form the south-western boundary.

== Road infrastructure ==
Route B25 (Grassy Road) runs through from west to east.
