= Brie de Meaux =

Protected type of Brie cheese

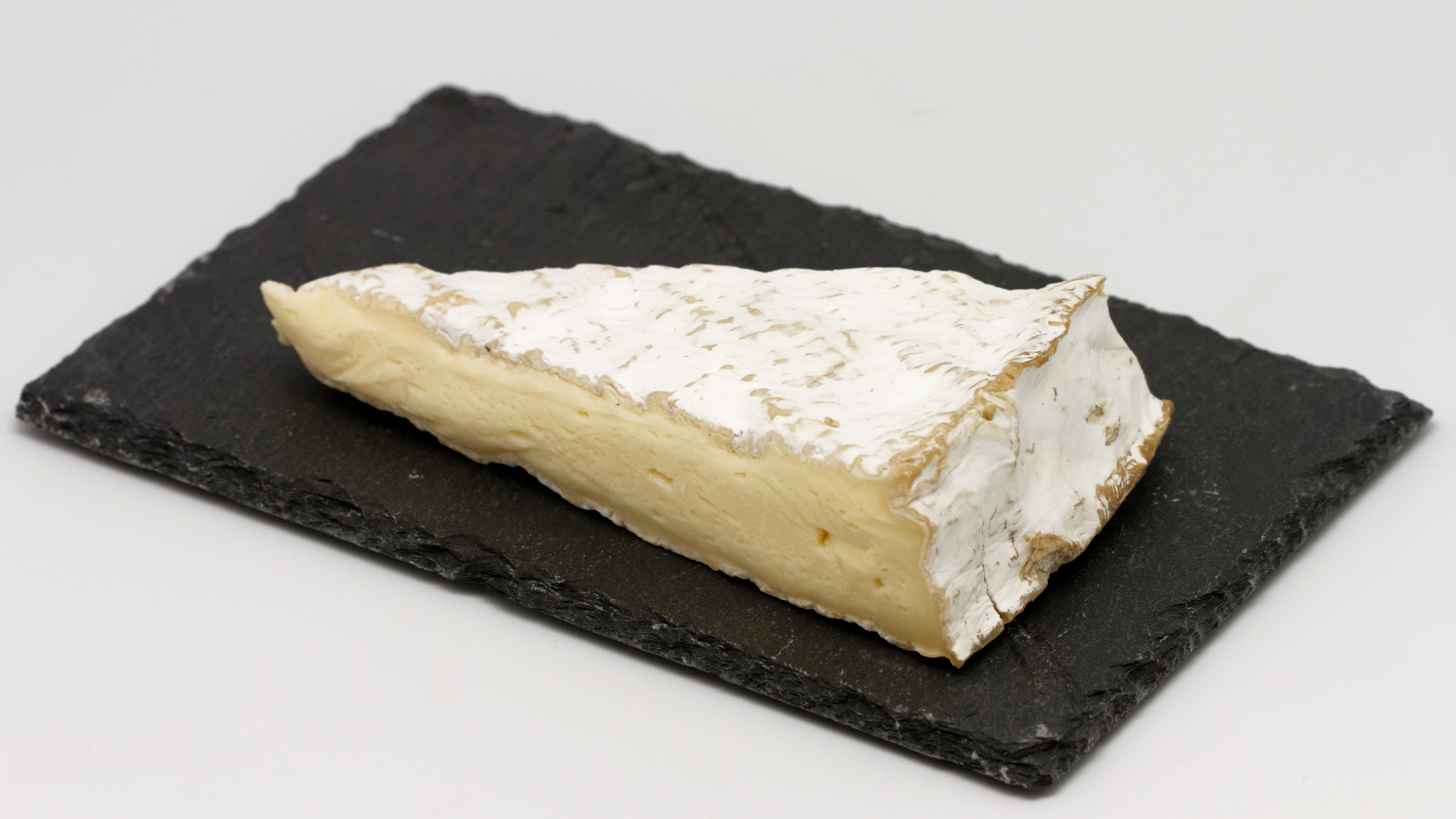
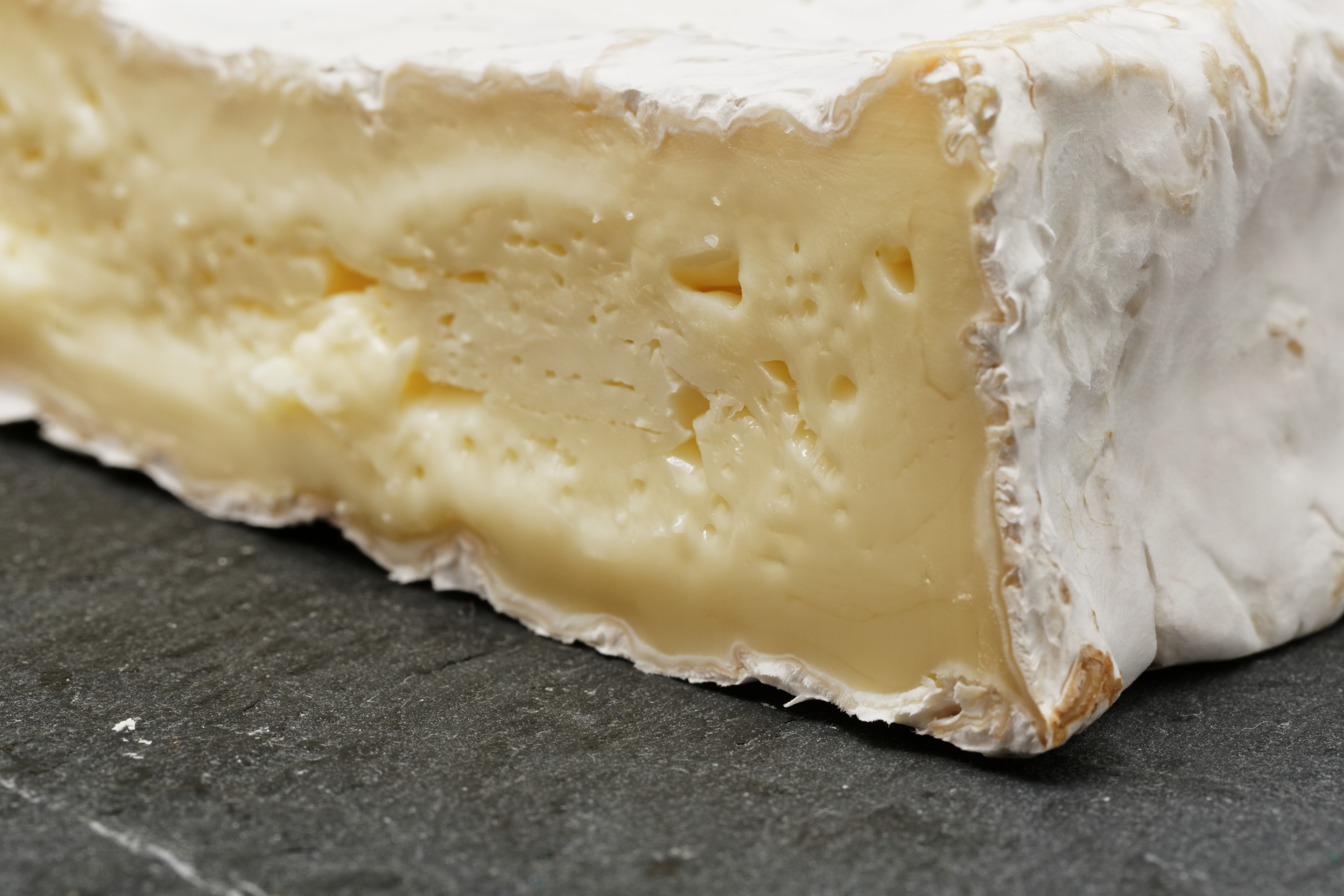
- Brie de Meaux Texture of Brie de Meaux
- Country of origin: France
- Town: Meaux
- Source of milk: Cows
- Texture: Soft-ripened
- Aging time: 6 to 8 weeks
- Certification: AOC, 1980

Brie de Meaux (French pronunciation: [bʁi də mo]) is a French brie cheese of the Brie region and a designated AOC product since 1980. Its name comes from the town of Meaux in the Brie region. As of 2003, 6,774 tonnes (a decline of 13.4% since 1998) were produced annually.

== Description ==
Brie de Meaux is made from raw, unpasteurised cow's milk, with an average weight of 2.8 kg (6 lb 3 oz) for a diameter of 36 to 37 cm (14 to 14 1/2 in). It has a soft, delicate white rind. The interior of the cheese is straw-yellow, creamy and soft.

== History ==
A modern legend identifies as Brie de Meaux a certain cheese dating to the seventh century, "rich and creamy", with an edible white rind that in the 774 AD Frankish Emperor Charlemagne first tasted in the company of a bishop and approved, requiring two cartloads to be sent to Aachen annually; the site, not mentioned in the anecdotal but unreliable ninth-century life of Charlemagne, De Carolo Magno by Notker the Stammerer, has become associated with the monastery traditionally founded by Rado in Reuil-en-Brie.

This cheese was named the "king of cheeses" in 1815 by Talleyrand at the Congress of Vienna.

== Manufacturing ==
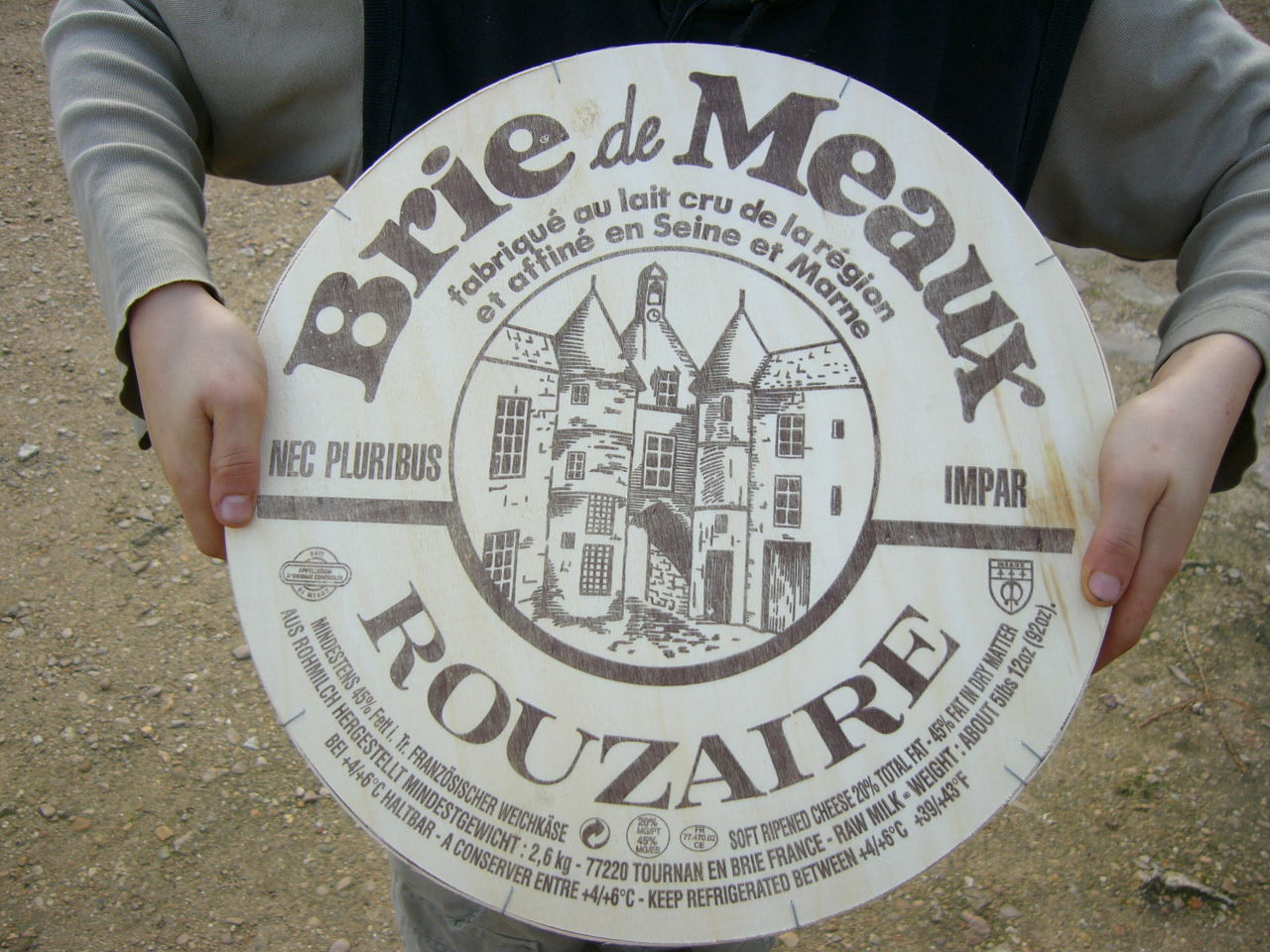
Brie de Meaux

Brie de Meaux falls under European Union Protected Designation of Origin regulations. is limited to the departments of Seine-et-Marne, Loiret, Meuse, Aube, Marne, Haute-Marne and the Yonne. There is, however, no production close to Meaux, and there is little celebration of the cheese in the town.

Brie de Meaux is made with raw cow's milk. It takes about 25 litres (6 1/2 US gal) of milk to make a 35 cm diameter, 1 cm tall cheese. The fermented milk is placed in a tank for 16 hours, then put in a bowl for curdling which lasts one hour. It is then cut into small cubes with a slice-curd. Finally, it is moulded by hand into thin layers with a brie shovel. The temperature in the room where casting is made must be increased to 33 °C (91 °F) for four hours to evacuate the whey, then at 24 °C (75 °F) for six hours and finally at 19 °C (66 °F). It is then drained on mats made of reeds. The next day, the cheese is then salted and they will then remain in the curing room for two days. Then, the cheeses are placed in a room at 12 °C (54 °F) in which they will begin to be refined and the characteristic white rind will begin to appear. After one week, the cheese will be placed in another refrigerator at 7 °C (45 °F). It must wait 3 weeks minimum, typically 6 to 8 weeks to reach full maturity. Throughout the ripening period, cheeses are routinely turned by hand. The time of manufacture of Brie de Meaux is two months.

== See also ==
- List of cheeses
