= Grassy, Tasmania =

Grassy
- Town
- Coordinates: 40°03′S 144°03′E
- Country: Australia
- State: Tasmania
- Region: North-west and west
- LGA: King Island
- Location: 25 km (16 mi) SE of Currie

Government
  - State electorate: Braddon
  - Federal division: Braddon

Population
  - Total: 139 (2016 census)
- Time zone: UTC+10
- Postcode: 7256
Localities around Grassy
Lymwood	Yarra Creek	Yarra Creek
Lymwood	Grassy	Bass Strait
Lymwood	Lymwood	Bass Strait

Grassy is a rural locality in the local government area (LGA) of King Island in the north-west and west LGA region of Tasmania. It is about 25 kilometres (16 mi) south-east of the town of Currie. The 2016 census recorded a population of 139 for the state suburb of Grassy. It was a tungsten mining town. Evidence of this can still be found in the small town. The highest population of Grassy was 767 in 1971.

== History ==
Grassy is a confirmed locality.

Grassy Post Office first opened on 11 March 1918 and closed in 1991.

== Geography ==
The waters of Bass Strait form the eastern and south-eastern boundaries.

== Road infrastructure ==
Route B25 (Grassy Road) provides access to the locality.
