= Loorana =

- Town
- Coordinates: 39°53′12″S 143°53′53″E
- Country: Australia
- State: Tasmania
- Region: North-west and west
- LGA: King Island
- Location: 9 km (5.6 mi) NE of Currie

Government
  - State electorate: Braddon
  - Federal division: Braddon

Population
  - Total: 120 (2016 census)
- Postcode: 7256
Localities around Loorana
Southern Ocean	Bungaree	Sea Elephant
Southern Ocean	Loorana	Sea Elephant, Pegarah
Southern Ocean	Currie, Nugara	Pegarah

Loorana is a rural locality in the local government area (LGA) of King Island in the North-west and west LGA region of Tasmania. The locality is about 9 kilometres (5.6 mi) north-east of the town of Currie. The 2016 census recorded a population of 120 for the state suburb of Loorana.

== History ==
Loorana was gazetted as a locality in 1971. The name is believed to be an Aboriginal word for "brushwood". The area was previously known as Porky.

== Geography ==
The waters of the Southern Ocean form the western boundary.

== Road infrastructure ==
Route B25 (North Road) runs through from south to north.
