= Little Christmas Island =

Island in south-eastern Australia

Coordinates: 42°15′S 148°01′E

Little Christmas Island is a small, flat, granite island, with an area of about 2 ha, in south-eastern Australia. It is part of the Schouten Island Group, lying close to the eastern coast of Tasmania near the Freycinet Peninsula. It is close to the Tasmanian mainland and, at low tide, is separated only by a shallow and narrow stretch of water.

== Fauna ==
Recorded breeding seabird and wader species are little penguin and sooty oystercatcher. European rabbits are present.
