= Netherby (ship) =

Wrecked on King Island, Tasmania in 1866

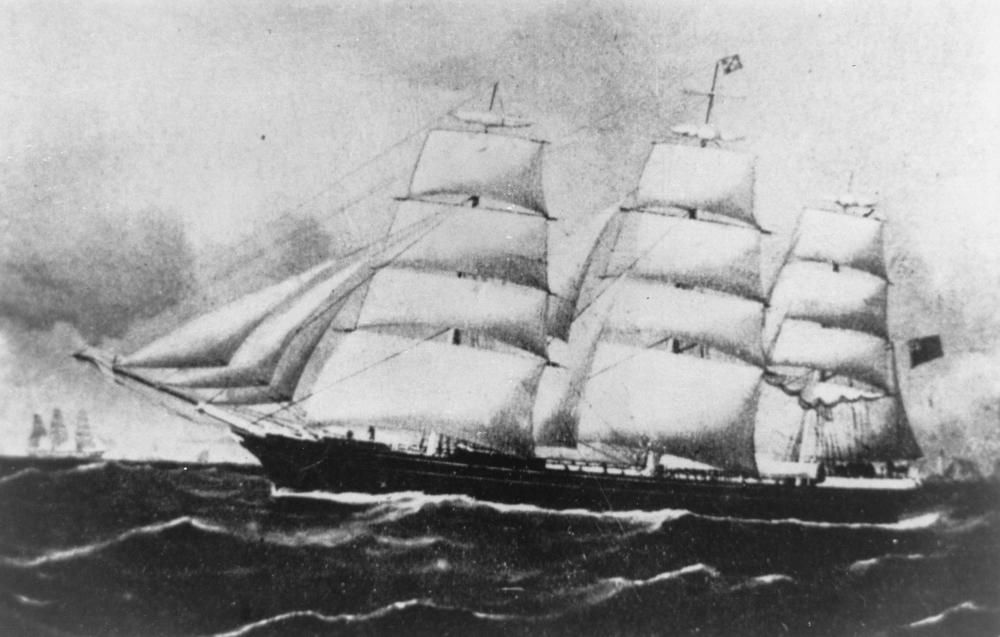
- Drawing of the Netherby

History

United Kingdom
- Name: Netherby
- Owner: James Baines & Co.
- Port of registry: Liverpool, United Kingdom
- Builder: Robert Thompson Jnr, County Durham, Sunderland, United Kingdom
- Launched: 1858
- Fate: Wrecked 14 July 1866

General characteristics
- Class & type: Packet ship
- Tons burthen: 944 tons
- Length: 176 ft 0 in (53.64 m)
- Beam: 22 ft 0 in (6.71 m)
- Depth of hold: 33 ft 0 in (10.06 m)
- Propulsion: Sails
- Sail plan: Full-rigged ship

Netherby was a full-rigged sailing ship of the Black Ball Line that ran aground and sank off the coast of King Island—an island in Bass Strait between Tasmania and the Australian mainland—on 14 July 1866 while sailing from London to Brisbane.

Remarkably, all of the 413 passengers and 49 crew were saved, firstly from drowning in the rough waters of Bass Strait and then from starvation on the mainly uninhabited island.

== The ship and voyage ==
Netherby was a 944-ton vessel of dimensions 176 ft × 33 ft × 22 ft, built in Sunderland in 1858. The vessel was under charter to the Queensland Government to carry emigrants from the United Kingdom to the then-British colony. Queensland, recently separated from its parent colony New South Wales, saw a need to quickly increase its population and so set in place a "land order" system of assisted emigration. Netherby was the 77th vessel to sail under this system for the Queensland government.

Sailing from East India Docks in London, Netherby sailed to Plymouth to take on its final group of emigrants before setting sail for Queensland. The ship's master for the voyage was Captain Owen Owens. The ship was supposed to take a route to the south of Tasmania but Owens decided to pass through Bass Strait instead. The ship had encountered extremely rough weather earlier in the voyage that had seen the steerage passengers confined below decks for 14 consecutive days. In taking the passage through Bass Strait, Owens hoped to avoid further rough weather and ease the burden on the passengers.

Owens' problems started when low cloud obscured the sun from view and thus he was unable to plot his position using celestial navigation techniques.

After Netherby was wrecked, all the 413 passengers and 49 crew were able to reach King Island safely, but there they were without shelter and with very limited provisions. The second officer, John Parry, led a small party of crew and passengers to procure assistance from the lighthouse on the island, but there were insufficient supplies there for the number of survivors. Parry and three others took the 23-foot whaleboat at the lighthouse and, despite high winds and rough seas, managed to reach the Australian mainland between Point Roadknight and Barwon Heads, where they met a party of surveyors who immediately assisted them. Parry then took a horse and rode the 26 miles to Geelong, from where he raised the alarm by telegram to Melbourne on 21 July.

The Victorian Government immediately summoned Captain William Henry Norman to load supplies of food, blankets, tents and medicine onto HMVS Victoria and then proceed at full speed to King Island to rescue the survivors; John Parry (who had travelled to Melbourne by train from Geelong) joined the ship to help locate the survivors. Another ship, Pharos, had also independently sailed from Williamstown to render assistance to the survivors. On Monday 23 July, Norman located the wreck of Netherby and, after discussions with the Netherby's Captain Owens took 230 passengers on board the Victoria (as many as was possible), while off-loading supplies for those remaining on the island. Then Pharos arrived and took on board the remaining 60 survivors near the wreck site, the other 117 survivors having left the wreck site heading to the lighthouse. Having taken the rescued people to Melbourne, Victoria and Pharos returned to the lighthouse at King Island, where they rescued the remaining survivors and replaced the lost whaleboat at the lighthouse. The survivors were taken by train and then by cab (a free service by the cabmen) to be accommodated in the Immigration Depot and Exhibition Building (not the present Royal Exhibition Building). Little of the luggage of the survivors was recovered, and most were in a wretched state after their ordeal; the Victorian public donated clothing and funds to assist the survivors, many of whom decided to settle in Victoria rather than undertake another sea voyage to Queensland.

The remaining passengers, bound for Brisbane, continued their journey on board City of Melbourne, arriving on 6 August 1866.
