= King Island Council =

- Local government area
- Interactive map of King Island Council
- Coordinates: 39.8637°S 143.9851°E
- Country: Australia
- State: Tasmania
- Region: King Island
- Established: 1 January 1907
- Council seat: Currie

Government
  - Mayor: Marcus Blackie
  - State electorate: Braddon
  - Federal division: Braddon

Area
  - Total: 1,096 km^{2} (423 sq mi)

Population
  - Total: 1,601 (2018)
  - Density: 1.4608/km^{2} (3.7834/sq mi)
- Website: King Island Council
LGAs around King Island Council
Great Australian Bight	Colac Otway (VIC); Bass Strait	Bass Strait
Great Australian Bight	King Island Council	Bass Strait
Indian Ocean	Indian Ocean	Bass Strait; Circular Head

King Island Council is a local government body in Tasmania, encompassing King Island and the adjacent minor islands within Bass Strait, in the north-west of the state. The King Island local government area is classified as rural and has a population of 1,601, with Currie as the main town and administrative centre.

== History and attributes ==
The King Island municipality was established on 1 January 1907 King Island is classified as rural, agricultural and small (RAS) under the Australian Classification of Local Governments.

== Council ==
=== Current composition ===
Name	Position	Party
Marcus Blackie	Mayor	Independent
Vernon Philbey	Deputy Mayor	Independent
Phillip Richards	Councillor	Independent
Ian Allan	Councillor	Independent
Ira Cooke	Councillor	Independent
David Bowden	Councillor	Independent
Gina Green	Councillor	Independent
Anna Hely	Councillor	Independent
Sarina Laidler	Councillor	Independent
Duncan McFie	Councillor	Independent

=== 2022 election results ===
One vacancy was not filled and a by-election was held on 27 October 2022.

2022 Tasmanian local elections: King Island
Party	Candidate	Votes	%	±%
Independent	Ian Allan (elected)	unopposed		
Independent	Marcus Blackie (elected)	unopposed		
Independent	David Bowden (elected)	unopposed		
Independent	Ira Cooke (elected)	unopposed		
Independent	Gina Green (elected)	unopposed		
Independent	Sarina Laidler (elected)	unopposed		
Independent	Duncan McFie (elected)	unopposed		
Independent	Vernon Philbey (elected)	unopposed		
Registered electors		1,179		

== Localities ==
- Bungaree
- Currie
- Egg Lagoon
- Grassy
- Loorana
- Lymwood
- Naracoopa
- Nugara
- Pearshape
- Pegarah
- Reekara
- Sea Elephant
- Surprise Bay
- Wickham
- Yambacoona
- Yarra Creek

== See also ==
- List of local government areas of Tasmania
