= King Island (Tasmania) =

Island in the Bass Strait

- Location within Tasmania
- Etymology: Philip Gidley King

Geography
- Location: Roaring Forties, Great Australian Bight and Bass Strait
- Coordinates: 39°52′21″S 143°59′8″E
- Archipelago: New Year Group
- Area: 1,098 km^{2} (424 sq mi)
- Area rank: 3rd in Tasmania
- Highest elevation: 162 m (531 ft)
- Highest point: Gentle Annie

Administration
- Australia
- State: Tasmania
- LGA: King Island Council
- Largest settlement: Currie

Demographics
- Population: 1617
- Pop. density: 1.50/km^{2} (3.88/sq mi)

Additional information
- Official website: https://kingisland.com.au

King Island is an island in Bass Strait, belonging to the Australian state of Tasmania. It is the largest of four islands known as the New Year Group and the second-largest island in Bass Strait (after Flinders Island). The island's population at the 2021 census was 1,617 people, up from 1,585 in 2016. The local government area of the island is the King Island Council.

The island forms part of the official land divide between the Great Australian Bight and Bass Strait, off the north-western tip of Tasmania and about halfway to the mainland state of Victoria. The southernmost point is Stokes Point and the northernmost point is Cape Wickham. There are three small islands immediately offshore: New Year Island and Christmas Island situated to the northwest and the smaller Councillor Island to the east, opposite Sea Elephant Beach.

King Island was first visited by Europeans in the late 18th century. It was named after Philip Gidley King, Colonial Governor of New South Wales, whose territory at the time included what is now Tasmania. Sealers established temporary settlements on the island in the early 19th century, but it was not until the 1880s that permanent settlements were established. The largest of these is Currie, situated on the island's west coast. Today, the island's economy is largely based on agriculture and tourism. It is also home to the Huxley Hill Wind Farm.

== History ==
King Island was originally part of a land bridge linking Tasmania with the Australian mainland, which was submerged around 12,000 years ago due to rising sea levels. A human skeleton was discovered in a cave on the island in 1989, which was dated to approximately 14,000 years ago. However, previous examinations had revealed no "shell heaps, bones, charcoal or other remains which might indicate Aboriginal occupation", suggesting that the area was traversed by the ancestors of Aboriginal Tasmanians but not permanently inhabited. It was uninhabited at the time of European discovery.

Captain Reed is the first known European to discover King Island in 1799 while hunting seals in the schooner Martha. Matthew Flinders' first map of "Van Diemen's Land" and "Basses Strait", which was sent to England (before Flinders had left) and was published in June 1800, did not show King Island. However, before Flinders left Sydney for England in 1800, Captain Black had informed Flinders of the existence of the island. Flinders' second map of Van Diemen's Land and Bass's Strait (properly finished en route to England) and published with his Observations in 1801 shows:

"Land of considerable extent has been seen about this situation".

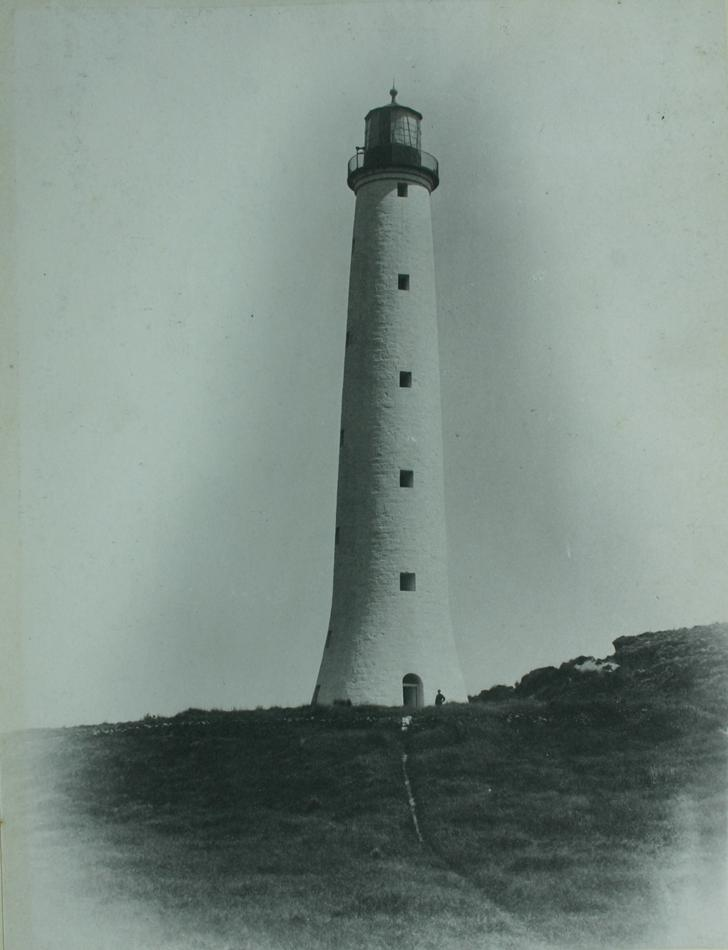
Built in 1861, the Cape Wickham Lighthouse is Australia's tallest lighthouse.

Although the impressive 48-metre (157 ft) granite tower, Australia's tallest lighthouse, was finished and the light first lit on 1 November 1861, the Cape Wickham Lighthouse was only officially opened in November 2011 at a community celebration of the light's 150th anniversary.

Captain John Black also visited the island just after Reed and named it King's Island after Governor Philip Gidley King. Captain John Black was sailing in the brig Harbinger, after which the dangerous Harbinger Rocks off the island's north-west coast are named. It was found to abound in both fur seals and Southern elephant seals, which were soon exploited to local extinction.

Governor King, knowing that the French navigator Nicolas Baudin was going to head for the island, when he left Port Jackson in 1800, sent the Cumberland from Sydney to claim the islands formally for Britain. The Cumberland arrived just before the French, and the British had hastily erected the British flag in a tree. Baudin still circumnavigated and extensively mapped the island in 1802, giving French names to some localities that are still in use today like "Phoques Bay" on the north-west coast.

As a result of this incident, British settlements were established at the River Derwent and Port Dalrymple in Tasmania and later Port Phillip.

Sealers continued to harvest the island intermittently until the mid-1820s, after which the only inhabitants were some old sealers and their Australian Aboriginal wives who mostly hunted wallaby for skins. The last of these left the island in 1854, and for many years it was only occasionally visited by hunters and more often castaways from shipwrecks.

The first submarine communications cable across Bass Strait in 1859 went via King Island, starting at Cape Otway, Victoria. It made contact with the Tasmanian mainland at Stanley Head, and then continued on to George Town. However, it started failing within a few weeks of completion, and by 1861 it failed completely. A later telephone and telegraph cable across Bass Strait operated via King Island from 1936 until 1963.

In the 1880s the land was opened for grazing. A township developed at Currie, and the post office opened on 1 June 1892 (known as King's Island until 1903, King Island until 1917, thereafter Currie). Currie, on the west coast, now has the only post office on the island, but in the past Grassy, in the southeast (1918–35, 1943–91), Naracoopa on the east coast (1920–62), Pearshape to the south (1946–59) and Egg Lagoon in the north (1925–67) replacing Yambacoona (1922–25) all had official post offices. The other localities of King Island are Bungaree, Loorana, Lymwood, Nugara, Pegarah, Reekara, Sea Elephant, Surprise Bay, Wickham and Yarra Creek. All share the postcode 7256.

=== Shipwrecks ===
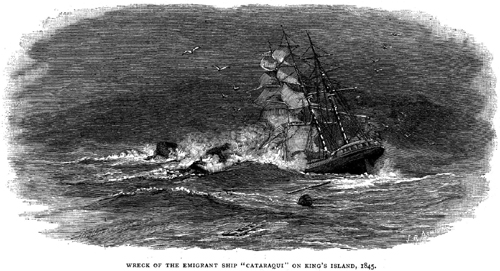
Wreck of the Cataraqui, Australia's deadliest maritime disaster with 400 victims. Three hundred and fourteen recovered bodies lie buried on King Island in five graves.

Situated in the centre of the western entrance to Bass Strait, King Island has been the location of more than 60 known shipwrecks, involving the loss of more than 2,000 lives. Many King Islanders are descendants of shipwreck survivors.

Notable shipwrecks include:

- 1801, large unidentified three-masted full-rigged ship, probably a whaler. No survivors known.
- 1835, Neva, convict ship 327 tons, 225 lives lost.
- 1840, Isabella, full-rigged ship 287 tons, no lives lost.
- 1843, Rebecca, barque 243 tons, five lives lost.
- 1845, Cataraqui, full-rigged ship 802 tons, 400 lives lost.
- 1854, Brahmin, full-rigged ship 616 tons, 17 lives lost.
- 1854, Waterwitch, schooner 134 tons, no lives lost.
- 1855, Whistler, American clipper ship, 942 tons, two lives lost.
- 1855, Maypo, brig 174 tons, two lives lost.
- 1865, Arrow, schooner 166 tons, one life lost.
- 1866, Netherby, full-rigged ship 944 tons, no lives lost.
- 1871, Loch Leven, iron clipper ship 1868 tons, one life lost.
- 1874, British Admiral, iron clipper ship, 79 lives lost.
- 1875, Blencathra, iron barque, 933 tons, no lives lost.
- 1910, Carnarvon Bay, steel full-rigged ship 1932 tons, no lives lost.
- 1920, Southern Cross, timber, three-masted brigantine, 257 tons, at least 9 lives lost.

== The island today ==
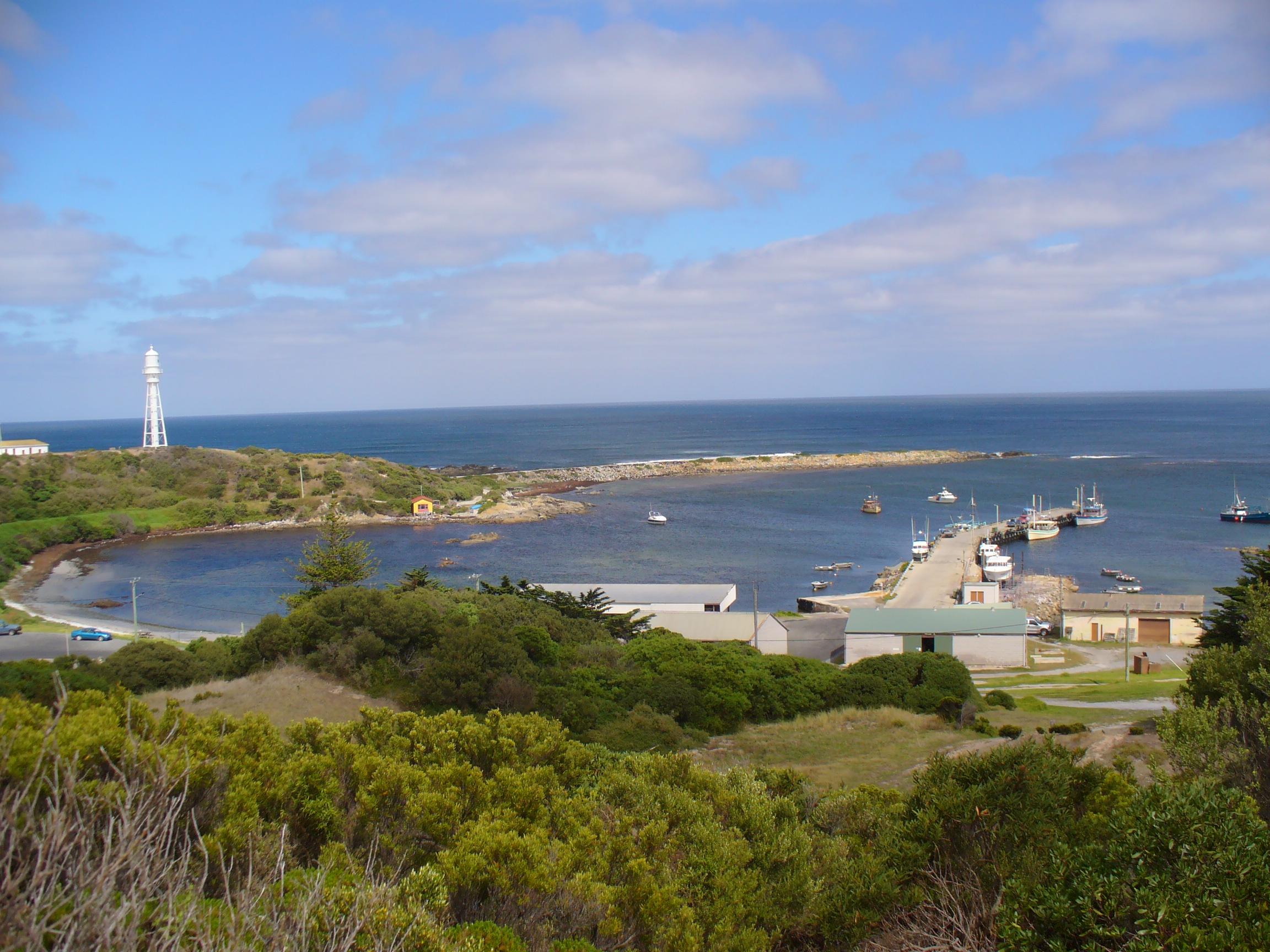
Currie Harbour, 2007

=== Currie ===
Currie, the largest town and administrative centre, is situated on the west coast of the island. The town had a population of 766 people in the 2021 census.

=== Grassy ===
The township of Grassy, on the island's east coast, is approximately 32 km south east of Currie. It was a thriving mining town where scheelite was extracted from an open-cut mine until 1974 when two underground mines were brought into production. After the mine closed in 1990, the mine site was rehabilitated, the town sold and the pit allowed to flood.

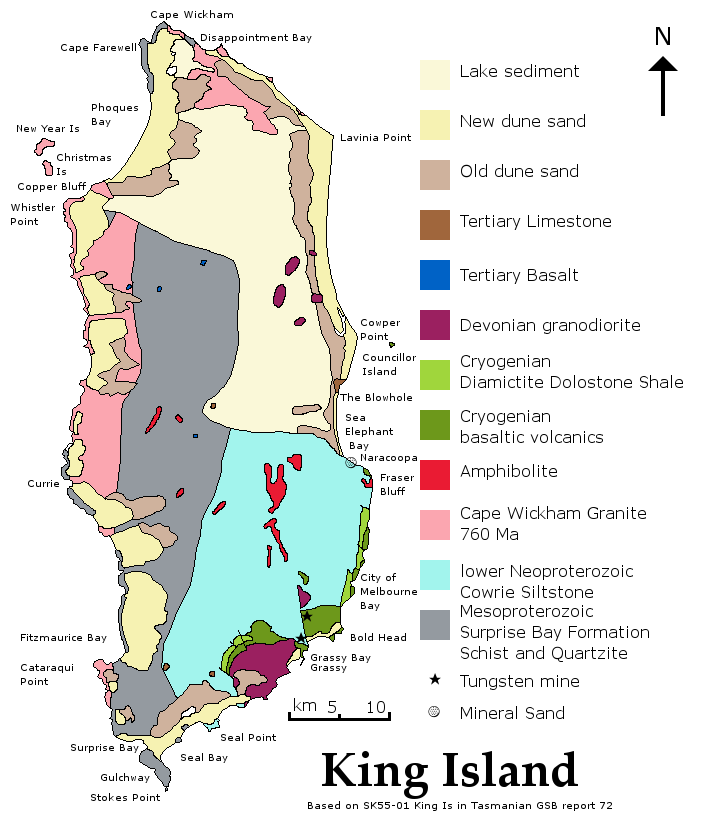
Surface geology of King Island

In recent years the Grassy population has increased again and consists of local families, sea-changers, a campus of Ballarat Clarendon College and holiday makers. There is a service station, a supermarket and several shops and restaurants. Grassy is also known for the little penguin rookery near the port (safe harbour) and platypus at the Upper Grassy Dam. There are ferries servicing the island with freight services between Victoria, northern Tasmania and Grassy Harbour.

A new $12.3 million wave power demonstration project is planned. Sitting partially submerged on the seabed, the Uniwave 200 will use oscillating water column technology to push air into a chamber fitted with an electricity-generating turbine.

=== Naracoopa ===
The village of Naracoopa is situated on the east coast about 20 kilometres (12 mi) from Currie and is known for its beach, jetty (fishing), holiday accommodation and eateries. There is a sheltered BBQ area and public toilets on the foreshore.

Naracoopa was the chief bulk fuels port and depot and is the site of a mineral sands deposit from which rutile, zircon and ilmenite were extracted between 1968 and 1977. The attractions of Naracoopa are the 100-year-old Naracoopa Jetty, blow hole and calmer weather.

== Economy and culture ==
The island is noted for its production of cheese, lobsters, bottled rain water, kelp and beef. The island's beef industry was seriously affected by the closure of the island's only abattoir, owned by Argentinian company JS Swift, in September 2012. King Island Dairy is currently the largest company on the island but is at risk of closing as of late 2025. It is a safe harbour for passing yachts and the site of the Huxley Hill Wind Farm operated by Hydro Tasmania.

The island has a football competition. The King Island Football Association, with just three teams, Currie, Grassy and North, competes annually in the Stonehaven Cup boat races, the Imperial 20-foot race, Queen's Birthday Weekend Pheasant Season and many other activities.

The island was the proposed location for the development of Australia's largest windfarm. This wind farm split the community into those for and against but eventually proved uneconomic to construct. The proposal was shelved in late 2014.

The Dolphin mine, located on the southeast side of the island, is one of the largest tungsten reserves in Australia.

== Environment ==
=== Birds ===
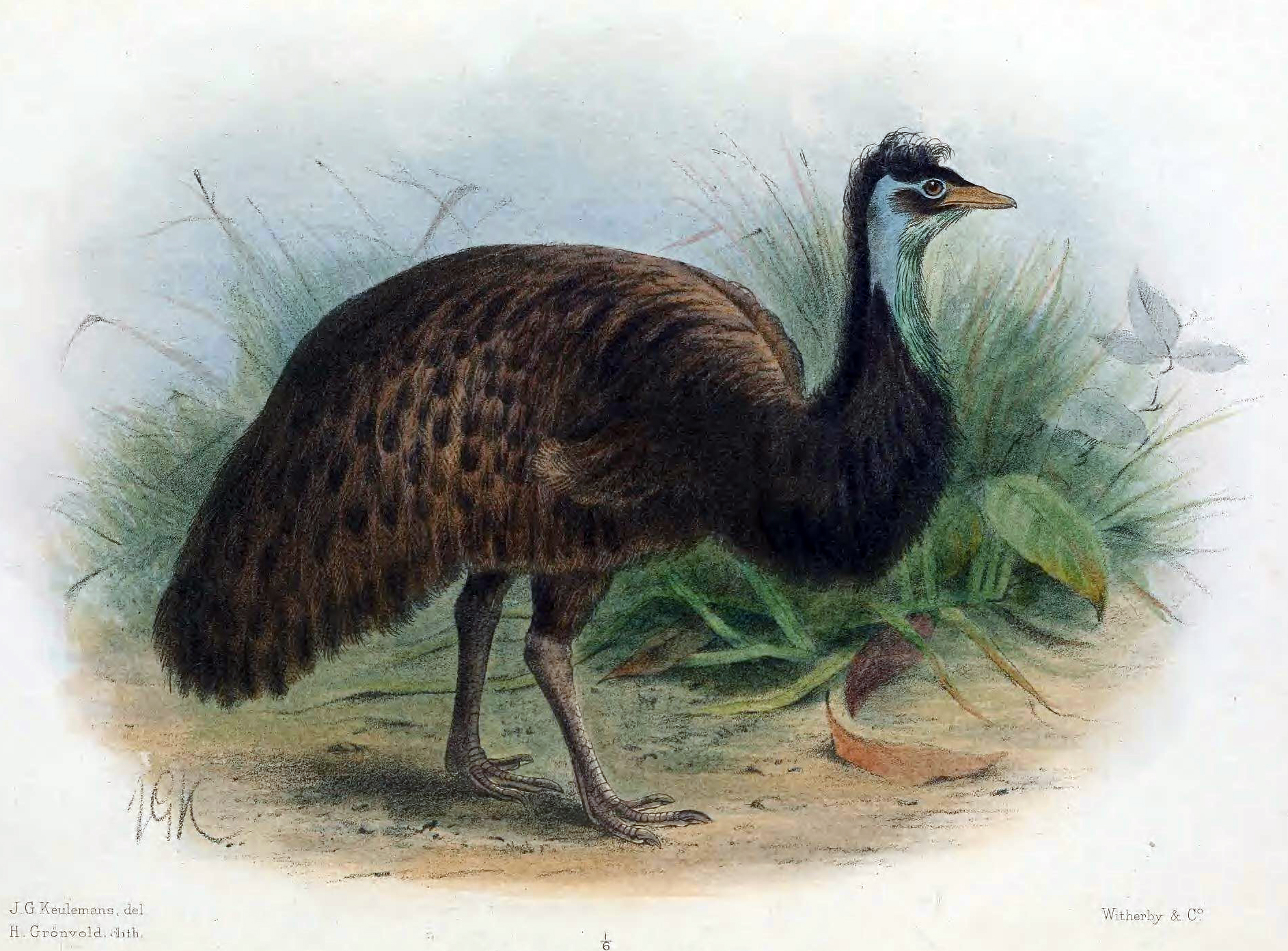
King Island Emu

The King Island emu was endemic to the island. Although numerous bones have been found, the only existing skin was collected by Nicolas Baudin in 1802, shortly before the species became extinct, probably as a result of hunting by sealers for food.

Some 193 km^{2} of the island, consisting of the coastline in a strip extending from the low water mark to one kilometre inland of the high-water mark around the entire island, with a broader area encompassing Lavinia State Reserve in the north-east, has been identified by BirdLife International as an Important Bird Area (IBA). The main feature making it an IBA is that it supports the small population of critically endangered orange-bellied parrots (Neophema chrysogaster) on the migration route between their breeding grounds in south-western Tasmania and their wintering grounds in mainland south-eastern Australia. More recently the King Island Biodiversity Management Plan 2012–2022 identified Lake Flannigan as important in this regard.

The IBA includes the nearby Christmas, New Year and Councillor Islands, which support breeding seabirds and waders. The IBA supports significant numbers of hooded plovers, flame robins and fairy terns, more than 1 per cent of the world populations of short-tailed shearwaters, pied and sooty oystercatchers, black-faced cormorants and pacific gulls, as well as populations of ten bird species endemic to Tasmania, including seven subspecies endemic to King Island.

=== Climate ===
King Island has a borderline Mediterranean (Csb)/oceanic climate (Cfb) with mild summers and wet winters.

Climate data for King Island
Month	Jan	Feb	Mar	Apr	May	Jun	Jul	Aug	Sep	Oct	Nov	Dec	Year
Record high °C (°F)	37.8 (100.0)	37.6 (99.7)	35.0 (95.0)	30.0 (86.0)	23.1 (73.6)	18.6 (65.5)	18.0 (64.4)	19.6 (67.3)	26.5 (79.7)	29.5 (85.1)	33.0 (91.4)	36.0 (96.8)	37.8 (100.0)
Mean daily maximum °C (°F)	20.3 (68.5)	20.6 (69.1)	19.6 (67.3)	17.2 (63.0)	15.1 (59.2)	13.5 (56.3)	12.9 (55.2)	13.2 (55.8)	14.3 (57.7)	15.6 (60.1)	17.0 (62.6)	18.7 (65.7)	16.5 (61.7)
Mean daily minimum °C (°F)	12.5 (54.5)	13.1 (55.6)	12.6 (54.7)	11.2 (52.2)	9.8 (49.6)	8.5 (47.3)	7.8 (46.0)	7.8 (46.0)	8.3 (46.9)	9.0 (48.2)	9.9 (49.8)	11.3 (52.3)	10.2 (50.4)
Record low °C (°F)	6.4 (43.5)	7.0 (44.6)	6.1 (43.0)	2.0 (35.6)	1.1 (34.0)	1.0 (33.8)	−0.5 (31.1)	−0.5 (31.1)	1.7 (35.1)	0.0 (32.0)	0.6 (33.1)	4.6 (40.3)	−0.5 (31.1)
Average precipitation mm (inches)	35.6 (1.40)	38.8 (1.53)	48.0 (1.89)	67.8 (2.67)	98.0 (3.86)	102.4 (4.03)	124.1 (4.89)	114.7 (4.52)	84.2 (3.31)	74.8 (2.94)	59.8 (2.35)	52.3 (2.06)	900.2 (35.44)
Average precipitation days	6.4	6.2	8.3	11.6	15.3	16.5	19.3	18.8	15.4	13.1	10.3	8.7	149.9
Source: Bureau of Meteorology

== See also ==
- Huxley Hill Wind Farm
- King Island Airport
