= Currie, Tasmania =

Currie
- Town
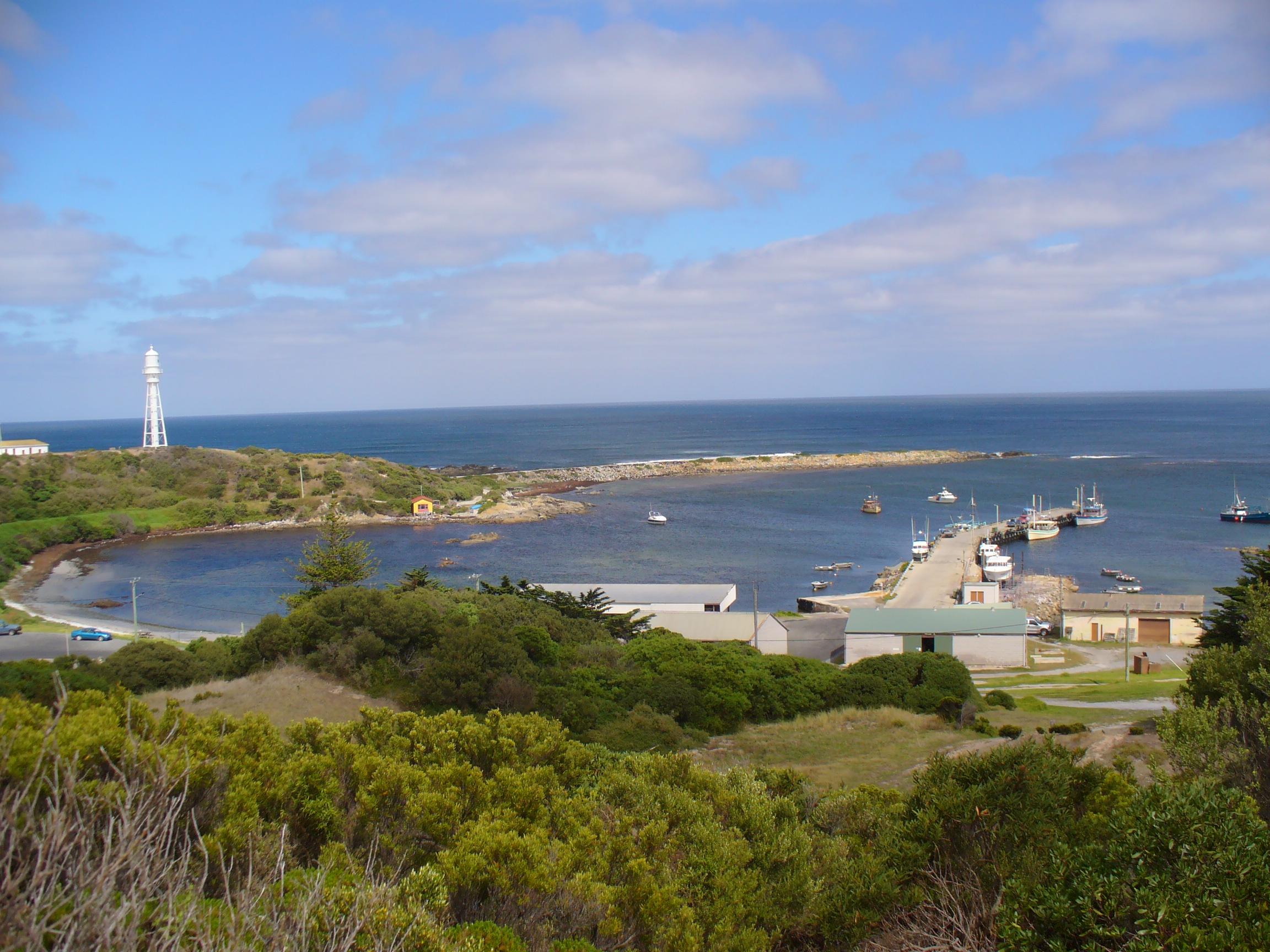
- Currie Harbour, 2007

- Coordinates: 39°55′52″S 143°51′02″E
- Country: Australia
- State: Tasmania
- Region: North-west and west
- LGA: King Island Council

Government
  - State electorate: Braddon
  - Federal division: Braddon

Population
  - Total: 659 (UCL 2021)
- Postcode: 7256
Localities around Currie
Southern Ocean	Loorana	Loorana
Southern Ocean	Currie	Nugara
Southern Ocean	Nugara	Nugara

Currie is a rural residential locality in the local government area (LGA) of King Island in the North-west and west LGA region of Tasmania. The 2021 census recorded a population of 659. It is the largest township on, and is the administrative centre of, King Island, at the western entrance to Bass Strait.

== History ==
Currie was originally called Howie's Boat Harbour after David Howie, an early visitor and unofficial resident of the island in the 1840s. It was renamed Currie, after Archibald Currie (1830–1914), a Melbourne shipowner who purchased the remains of the full-rigged ship Netherby wrecked near there in 1866, and used the harbour as a base for salvage operations.

The harbour was used for similar operations on later wrecks in the vicinity including the British Admiral in 1874 and Blencathra in 1875, the latter being wrecked right at the entrance to the harbour. Currie Lighthouse was built here in 1879.

Increasing knowledge of the surrounding landscape led to permanent agricultural settlement very soon afterwards, mostly grazing beef and dairy cattle. It was, until the opening of the all-weather port of Grassy Harbour in 1974, the main port connecting the island with both Victoria and Tasmania.

Currie was gazetted as a locality in 1971.

== Geography ==
The waters of the Southern Ocean form the western and south-western boundaries. The town is situated just inland from a partly sheltered natural harbour on the west coast of the island. It is a significant centre for the fishing industry, especially rock lobster. There is also a nearby airport, King Island Airport, capable of handling medium-sized turbopropeller aircraft.

== Transport ==
=== Road infrastructure ===
Route B25 runs north from the town centre as Main Street and then as North Road. It also runs east as Grassy Road.

=== Airport ===
King Island Airport is a commercial airport located near the town. It functions as the hub of King Island Airlines.

== Media ==
=== Radio ===
Radio stations that broadcast to Currie and King Island are ABC Northern Tasmania on 88.6 FM, LAFM on 89.3 FM, Chilli FM on 90.1 FM and King Island Radio, which is a community based station for the Island which broadcast 100.5 FM.

=== Television ===
Along with the rest of the state, Currie and King Island has four free-to-air television stations, including two government funded channels from the Australian Broadcasting Corporation (ABC), the Special Broadcasting Service (SBS) and two commercial stations; (Southern Cross Seven (7HD) & WIN (9HD) These services are available in digital format as well as eleven digital-only stations, one carrying Network 10 programming (Tasmanian Digital Television (10 HD), and nationwide digital-only stations ABC TV Plus/ABC Kids, ABC ME and ABC News (on ABC), SBS Viceland, SBS Food and NITV (on SBS), 7two and 7mate (on SC Seven), 9Gem, 9Go! and 9Life (on WIN), and 10 Bold, 10 Peach and 10 Shake (on TDT).

== Climate ==
Currie has a very mild oceanic climate (Köppen Cfb) bordering on a Mediterranean climate (Csb) owing to its summers being drier than most of Tasmania. Winter frosts are extremely rare owing to the strong maritime influence (rarer than at Urandangi, over 18 degrees closer to the equator), whilst only three days per year will exceed 30 °C (86 °F). Owing to the strong westerly winds from the Southern Ocean, Currie's weather on most days is cloudy and showery – over half of all days receive some rainfall, though seldom is it heavy, and only 25 days per year have cloud cover under one-eighth, with fewer than four such days on average even during the quite dry summer months. The town is quite windy, with a mean wind speed of 21.6 kilometres per hour (13.4 mph; 11.7 kn) and gusts as high as 124 kilometres per hour (77.1 mph; 67.0 kn).

Climate data for Currie Post Office (1909-1997)
Month	Jan	Feb	Mar	Apr	May	Jun	Jul	Aug	Sep	Oct	Nov	Dec	Year
Record high °C (°F)	38.4 (101.1)	37.6 (99.7)	35.0 (95.0)	30.0 (86.0)	23.1 (73.6)	18.6 (65.5)	18.0 (64.4)	19.6 (67.3)	26.5 (79.7)	29.5 (85.1)	33.0 (91.4)	36.0 (96.8)	38.4 (101.1)
Mean daily maximum °C (°F)	20.3 (68.5)	20.6 (69.1)	19.6 (67.3)	17.2 (63.0)	15.1 (59.2)	13.5 (56.3)	12.9 (55.2)	13.2 (55.8)	14.3 (57.7)	15.6 (60.1)	17.0 (62.6)	18.7 (65.7)	16.5 (61.7)
Mean daily minimum °C (°F)	12.5 (54.5)	13.1 (55.6)	12.6 (54.7)	11.2 (52.2)	9.8 (49.6)	8.5 (47.3)	7.8 (46.0)	7.8 (46.0)	8.3 (46.9)	9.0 (48.2)	9.9 (49.8)	11.3 (52.3)	10.2 (50.4)
Record low °C (°F)	6.4 (43.5)	7.0 (44.6)	6.1 (43.0)	2.0 (35.6)	1.1 (34.0)	1.1 (34.0)	−0.5 (31.1)	−0.5 (31.1)	1.7 (35.1)	0.0 (32.0)	0.6 (33.1)	4.6 (40.3)	−0.5 (31.1)
Average rainfall mm (inches)	35.6 (1.40)	38.8 (1.53)	48.0 (1.89)	67.8 (2.67)	98.0 (3.86)	102.4 (4.03)	124.1 (4.89)	114.7 (4.52)	84.2 (3.31)	74.8 (2.94)	59.8 (2.35)	52.3 (2.06)	900.5 (35.45)
Average rainy days (≥ 0.2 mm)	10.7	10.2	13.7	17.4	21.3	22.3	24.3	23.8	20.6	18.5	15.4	13.4	211.6
Average relative humidity (%)	67	68	70	75	79	80	79	77	75	74	72	70	74
Source: Bureau of Meteorology
