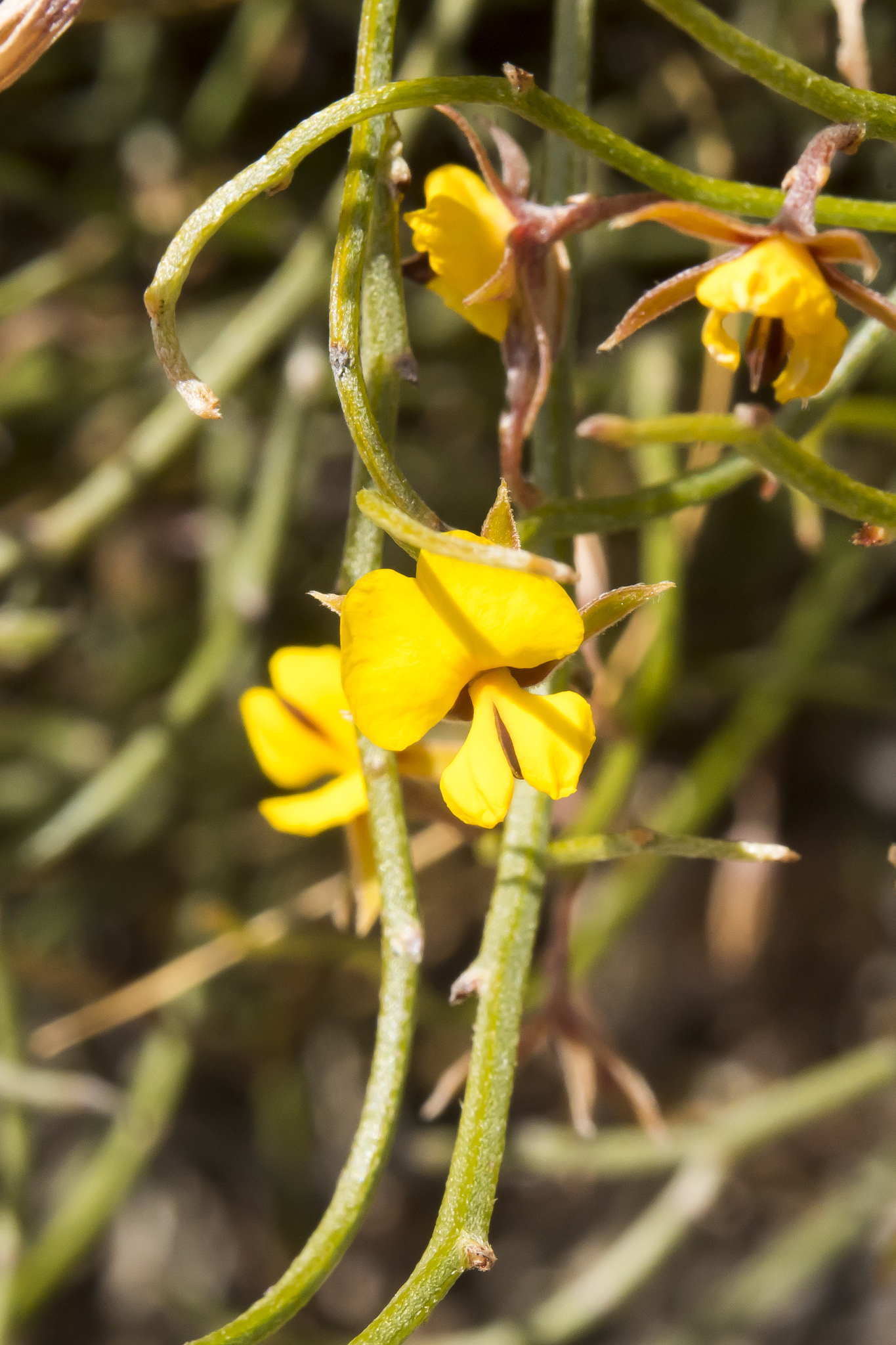

Conservation status
- Priority One — Poorly Known Taxa (DEC)

Scientific classification
- Kingdom: Plantae
- Clade: Tracheophytes
- Clade: Angiosperms
- Clade: Eudicots
- Clade: Rosids
- Order: Fabales
- Family: Fabaceae
- Subfamily: Faboideae
- Genus: Jacksonia
- Species: J. debilis

Binomial name
- Jacksonia debilis Chappill

= Jacksonia debilis =

Species of legume

Jacksonia debilis is a species of flowering plant in the family Fabaceae and is endemic to the south west of Western Australia. It is a spreading to prostrate shrub with curved phylloclades, yellow-orange flowers with red markings, and woody, hairy pods.

== Description ==
Jacksonia debilis is a spreading to prostrate shrub that typically grows up to 0.1–0.2 m (3.9 in – 7.9 in) high and 0.4–2 m (1 ft 4 in – 6 ft 7 in) wide, its branches greyish-green. Its phylloclades are curved with the leaves reduced to pale brown to dark brown egg-shaped scales, 0.7–2.1 mm (0.028–0.083 in) long and 0.75–1.4 mm (0.030–0.055 in) wide with toothed edges. The flowers are scattered along branches each flower on a pedicel 1.5–4.5 mm (0.059–0.177 in) long. There are egg-shaped bracteoles 0.75–2.3 mm (0.030–0.091 in) long and 0.5–0.8 mm (0.020–0.031 in) wide on the pedicels. The floral tube is 0.3–0.6 mm (0.012–0.024 in) long and the sepals are membranous, the lobes 5.3–6.8 mm (0.21–0.27 in) long, 0.8–1.3 mm (0.031–0.051 in) wide and fused at the base. The standard petal is yellow-orange to orange with a red "eye", 3.5–7.7 mm (0.14–0.30 in) long and 5.5–8.2 mm (0.22–0.32 in) deep, the wings yellow-orange, 4.7–6.6 mm (0.19–0.26 in) long, and the keel deep red around the edges, 3.7–5.3 mm (0.15–0.21 in) long. The stamens have white filaments 2.2–4.8 mm (0.087–0.189 in) long. Flowering occurs from August to November, and the fruit is a woody, densely hairy, elliptic pod, 8.0–8.5 mm (0.31–0.33 in) long and about 3.5 mm (0.14 in) wide.

== Taxonomy ==
Jacksonia debilis was first formally described in 2007 by Jennifer Anne Chappill in Australian Systematic Botany from specimens collected 10 km (6.2 mi) east of Newdegate in 1991. The specific epithet (debilis) means 'feeble' or 'weak', referring to the lowly habit of this species.

== Distribution and habitat ==
This species of Jacksonia grows in mallee woodland in scattered locations between Coorow, Bruce Rock, Kukerin and Newdegate in the Avon Wheatbelt and Mallee bioregions of inland south-western Western Australia.

== Conservation status ==
Jacksonia debilis is listed as "Priority One" by the Government of Western Australia Department of Biodiversity, Conservation and Attractions, meaning that it is known from only one or a few locations where it is potentially at risk.
