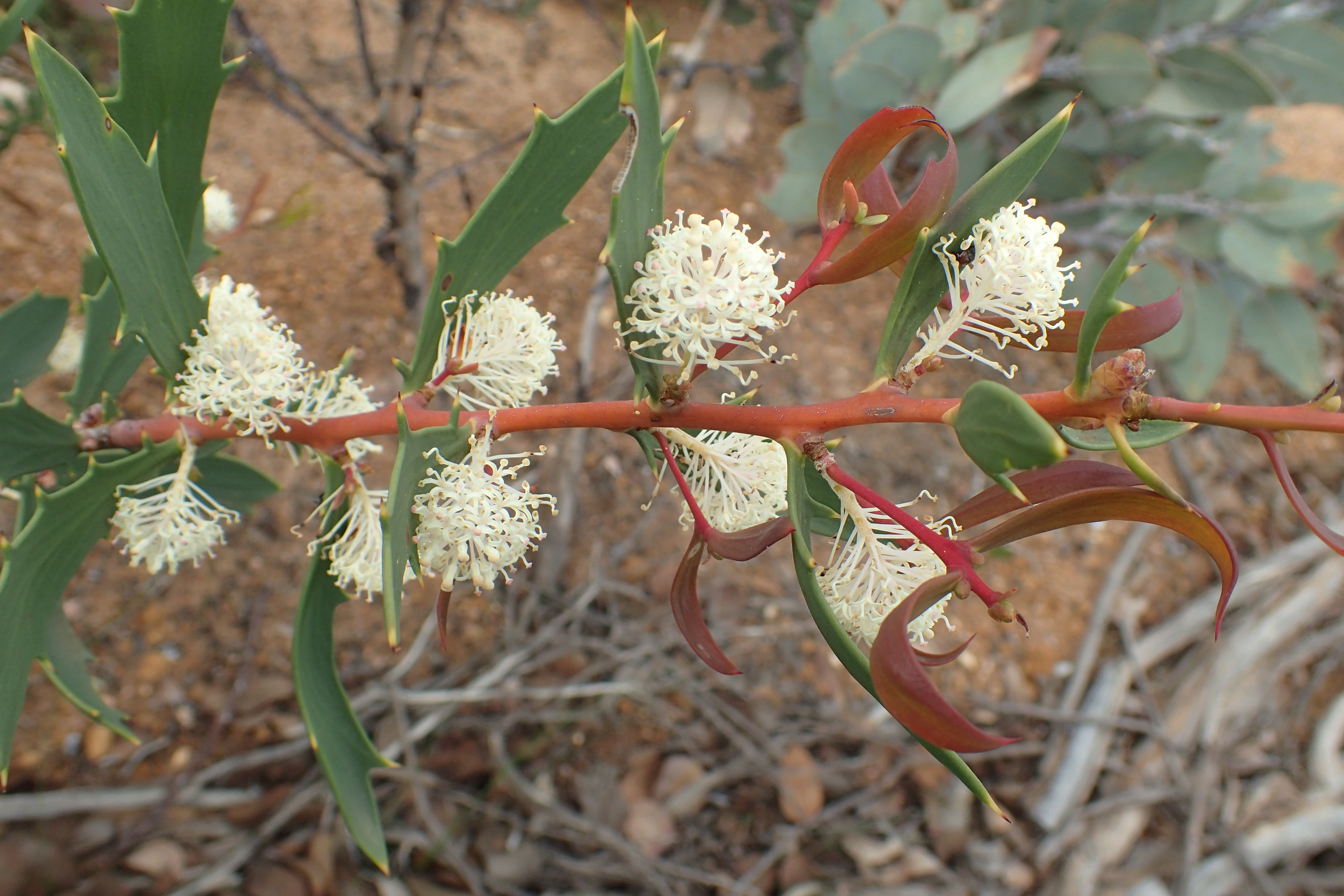

Conservation status
- Critically Endangered (IUCN 3.1)

Scientific classification
- Kingdom: Plantae
- Clade: Tracheophytes
- Clade: Angiosperms
- Clade: Eudicots
- Order: Proteales
- Family: Proteaceae
- Genus: Hakea
- Species: H. ilicifolia

Binomial name
- Hakea ilicifolia R.Br.

= Hakea ilicifolia =

Species of plant endemic to Western Australia

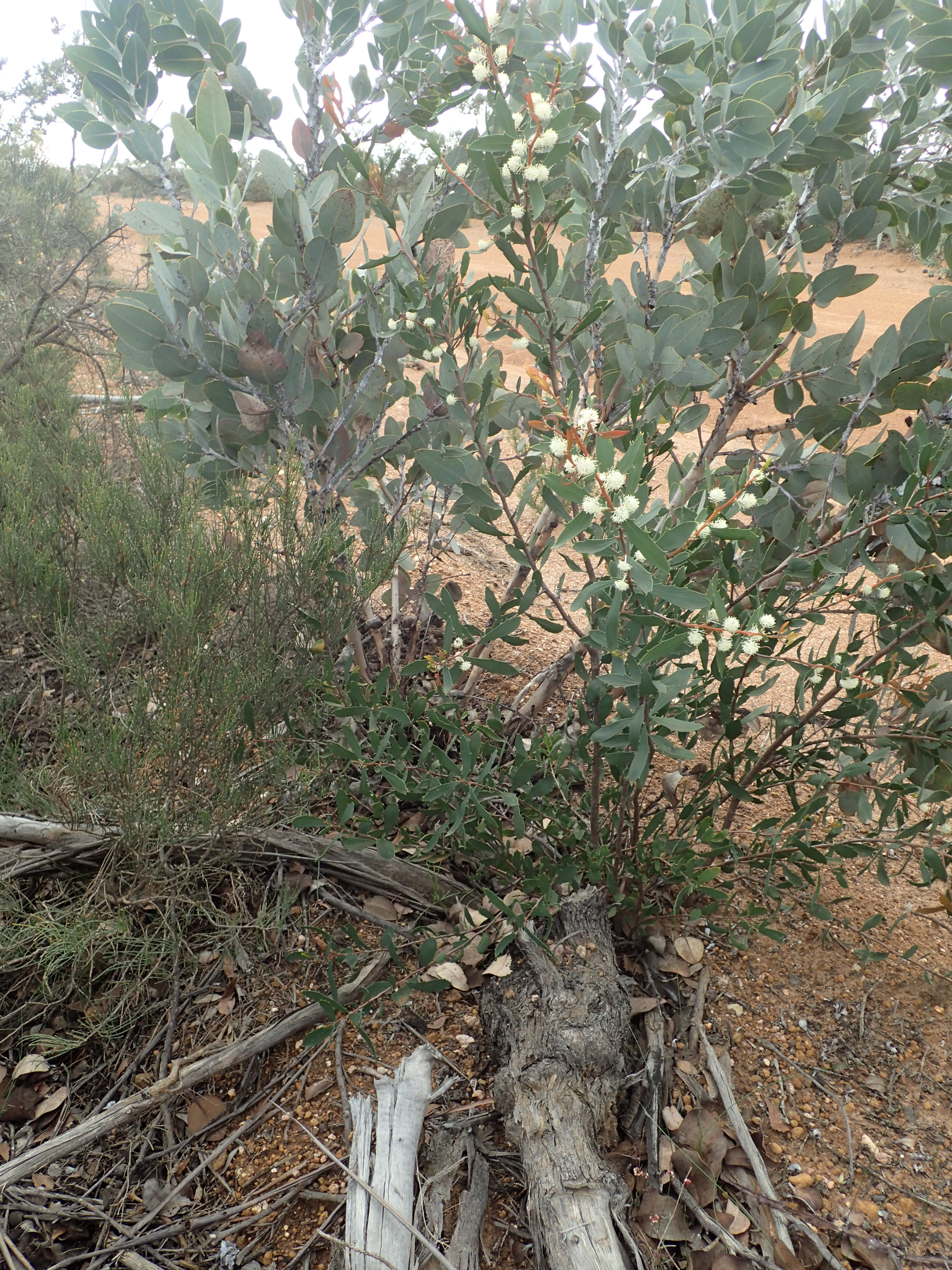
Habit on Horner Road, south-east of Ravensthorpe

Hakea ilicifolia is an open shrub or tree in the family Proteaceae and is endemic to Western Australia. It is a small, dense shrub with stiff, lobed leaves and clusters of yellow or creamy-white flowers.

== Description ==
Hakea ilicifolia is an open multi-stemmed shrub or tree typically growing to a height of 1 to 3 metres (3.3 to 9.8 ft). The flowers are in a branching corymb with the foliage thickest at the apex. The branchlets are covered with rusty to woolly white soft, matted hairs. The leaves are stiff, flat, elliptic, 1.5–5 cm (0.59–1.97 in) long, 5–20 mm (0.20–0.79 in) wide, tapering or wedge-shaped at the apex and coarsely toothed. The inflorescence consists of about 16 sweetly scented flowers borne in the leaf axils on outer branchlets, each flower 3–3.5 mm (0.12–0.14 in) long, yellow or cream on a pedicel 3.5–6.5 mm (0.14–0.26 in) long. Flowering occurs from August to October and the fruit is oval shaped, 2–2.2 cm (0.79–0.87 in) long, 1.5–1.6 cm (0.59–0.63 in) wide, warty with two curving horns 3.5–4.5 mm (0.14–0.18 in) long.

== Taxonomy and naming ==
Hakea ilicifolia was first formally described in 1810 by Robert Brown and the description was published in Transactions of the Linnean Society of London. It was named from the genus Ilex - holly and the Latin folium - leaf, referring to the holly-shaped leaves.

== Distribution and habitat ==
Holly-leaved hakea is endemic to a few isolated areas in the Wheatbelt, Great Southern and Goldfields-Esperance regions of Western Australia. It has a scattered distribution between Denmark in the south and west, Dumbleyung in the north and Esperance in the east where it is found on breakaway slopes and near creeks growing in sandy, loamy or clay soils over sandstone or laterite and a part of heathland or low Eucalyptus woodland communities.

== Conservation status ==
Hakea ilicifolia is listed as "Critically Endangered" on the IUCN Red List of Threatened Species. The population is suspected to be declining and severely fragmented. Historically, extensive population decline would have taken place through land clearing for agricultural purposes. Current threats to this species include disturbance of roadside verges reducing population size, weed invasion, altered fire regimes associated with climate change, droughts and browsing of resprouted shoots followed by fires by rabbits.
