= Goodenia laevis =

Smooth goodenia

Scientific classification
- Kingdom: Plantae
- Clade: Tracheophytes
- Clade: Angiosperms
- Clade: Eudicots
- Clade: Asterids
- Order: Asterales
- Family: Goodeniaceae
- Genus: Goodenia
- Species: G. laevis

Binomial name
- Goodenia laevis Benth.

Species of plant

Goodenia laevis, commonly known as smooth goodenia, is a species of flowering plant in the family Goodeniaceae and is endemic to south-western Western Australia. It is a prostrate or ascending sub-shrub with oblong to lance-shaped leaves with the narrower end towards the base and racemes or thyrses of yellow flowers with purplish markings.

== Description ==
Goodenia laevis is a prostrate or ascending sub-shrub that has stems up to 70 cm (28 in) long. The leaves are oblong to lance-shaped with the narrower end towards the base, 10–30 mm (0.39–1.18 in) long and 3–6 mm (0.12–0.24 in) wide, sometimes with a few teeth on the edge. The flowers are arranged in racemes or thyrses up to 60 mm (2.4 in) long on a peduncle 5–12 mm (0.20–0.47 in) long with linear bracteoles about 2.5 mm (0.098 in) long. The sepals are linear, 3–4 mm (0.12–0.16 in) long and the corolla is yellow with purplish markings and 10–12 mm (0.39–0.47 in) long. The lower lobes of the corolla are about 3–3.5 mm (0.12–0.14 in) long with wings 0.5–1 mm (0.020–0.039 in) wide. Flowering mainly occurs from August to December and the fruit is an oval to cylindrical capsule about 6 mm (0.24 in) long.

== Taxonomy and naming ==
Goodenia laevis was first formally described in 1868 by George Bentham in Flora Australiensis from specimens collected by George Maxwell in the "Phillips Ranges". The specific epithet (laevis) means "smooth".

In 1998, Leigh William Sage described two subspecies of G. laevis in the journal Nuytsia and the names are accepted by the Australian Plant Census:

- Goodenia laevis subsp. humifusa L.W.Sage has a prostrate habit and leaves 5–13 mm (0.20–0.51 in) wide;
- Goodenis laevis Benth. subsp. laevis has an erect habit and leaves 1–3 mm (0.039–0.118 in) wide.

The name (humifusa) means "lying down", referring to the prostrate habit of this subspecies.

== Distribution and habitat ==
Smooth goodenia grows in open mallee shrubland. Subspecies humifusa occurs between Ravensthorpe, Jerramungup, Dumbleyung and north to Digger Rocks. Subspecies laevis is found between Esperance, Scadden and north to Mount Ley.

== Conservation status ==
Goddenia laevis is classified as "not threatened" by the Department of Environment and Conservation (Western Australia) but subspecies laevis is classified as "Priority Three", meaning that it is poorly known and known from only a few locations but is not under imminent threat.
