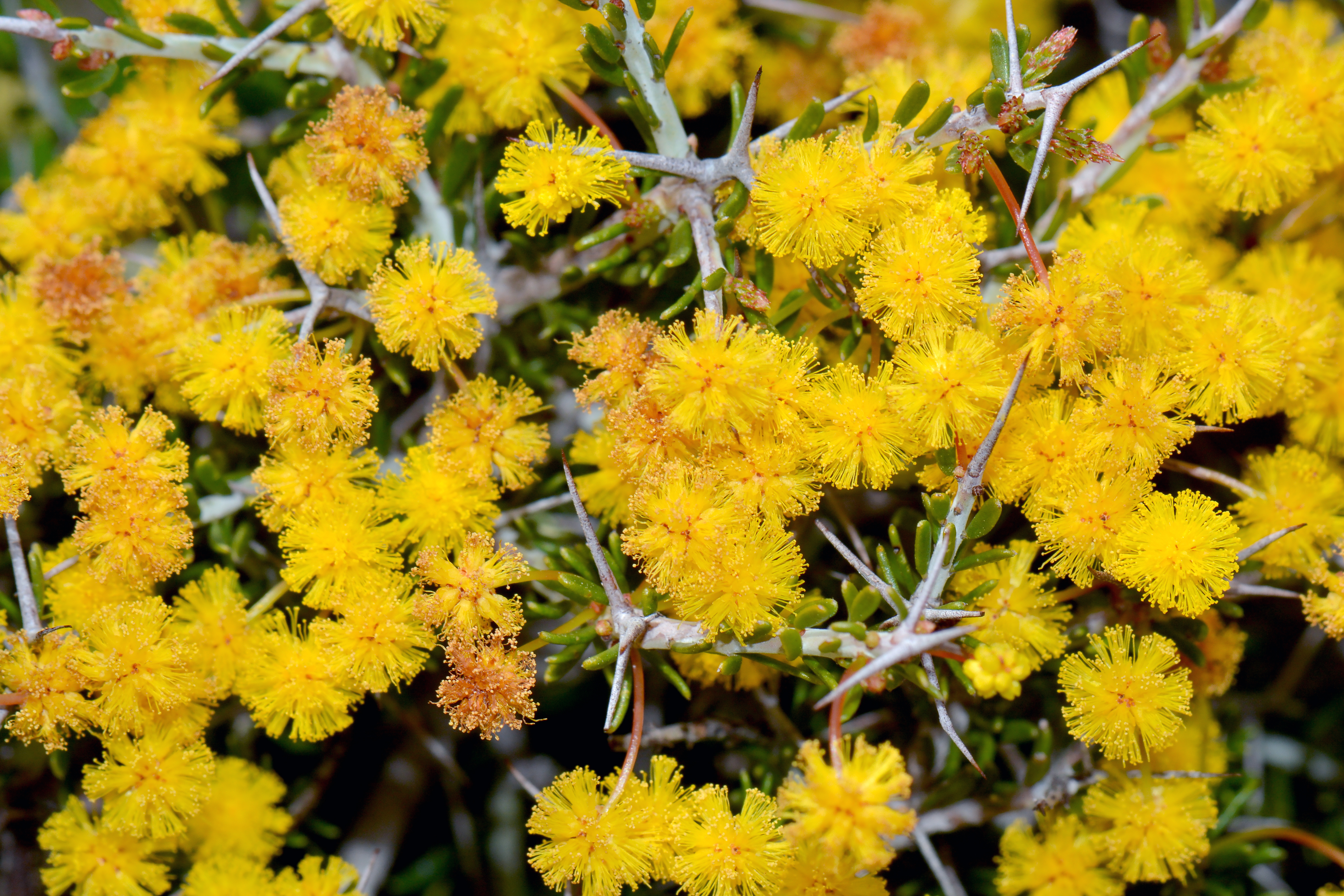

Scientific classification
- Kingdom: Plantae
- Clade: Tracheophytes
- Clade: Angiosperms
- Clade: Eudicots
- Clade: Rosids
- Order: Fabales
- Family: Fabaceae
- Subfamily: Caesalpinioideae
- Clade: Mimosoid clade
- Genus: Acacia
- Species: A. acanthaster

Binomial name
- Acacia acanthaster Maslin
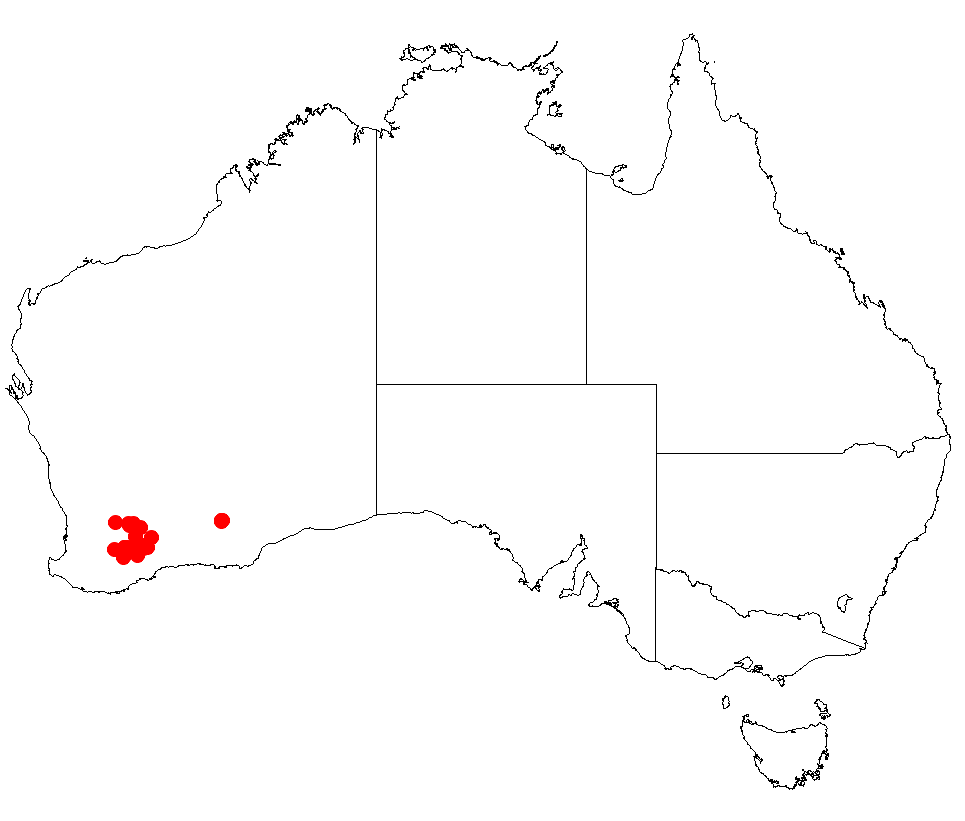
- Occurrence data from AVH

Synonyms
- Racosperma acanthaster (Maslin) Pedley

= Acacia acanthaster =

Species of legume

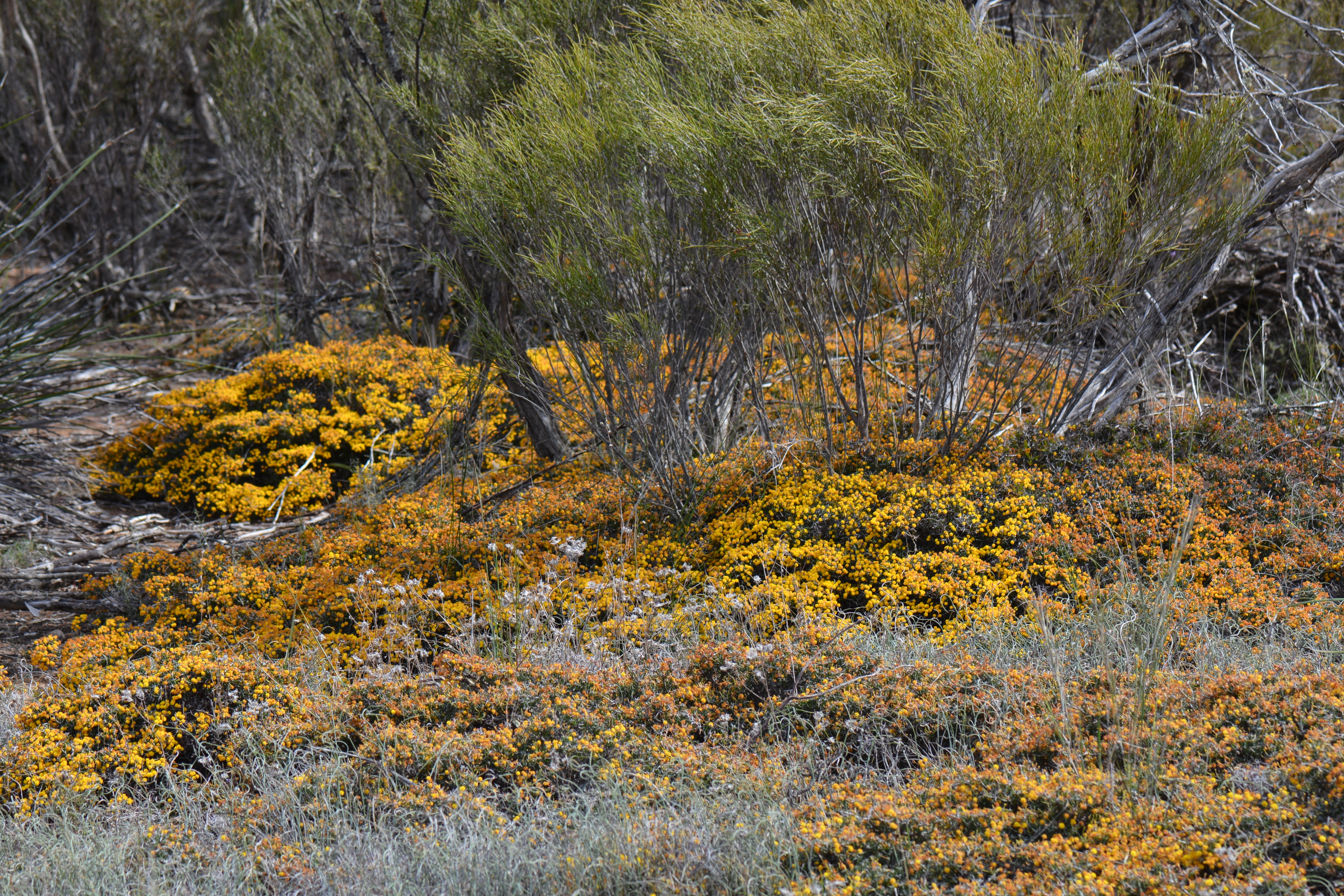
Habitat near Dumbleyung

Acacia acanthaster is a species of flowering plant in the family Fabaceae and is endemic to the south-west of Western Australia. It is a rigid, densely-branched, domed shrub with flat, linear phyllodes, spherical heads of golden-yellow flowers, and curved pods that resemble a string of beads.

== Description ==
Acacia acanthaster is a rigid, densely-branched, domed shrub that typically grows to 0.2–0.5 m (7.9 in – 1 ft 7.7 in) high and 1–2.5 mm (0.039–0.098 in) wide. Its branchlets are glabrous, and divided near the ends into a few short, radiating, leafless spines. The phyllodes are glabrous, flat and linear, 3–8 mm (0.12–0.31 in) long and 0.5–1 mm (0.020–0.039 in) wide. Between 18 and 27 golden-yellow flowers are arranged in 1 or 2 spherical heads 3.0–3.5 mm (0.12–0.14 in) long on a peduncle 6–11 mm (0.24–0.43 in) long. Flowering occurs from August to October and the pods are curved or loosely coiled, 35 mm (1.4 in) long, 1.5–2.5 mm (0.059–0.098 in) wide and resemble a string of beads. The seeds are elliptic, about 2 mm (0.079 in) long and have a white, club-shaped aril.

== Taxonomy ==
Acacia acanthaster was first formally described by the botanist Bruce Maslin in 1999 in the journal Nuytsia from specimens collected about 63 km (39 mi) north-east of Norseman from specimens collected by Kenneth Newbey in 1980. In 2006, Leslie Pedley transferred the species to Racosperma as R. acanthaster, but that name is considered a synonym of A. acanthaster by the Australian Plant Census. The specific epithet (acanthaster) means "a prickly star", referring to the spines on the ends of the branchlets.

== Distribution and habitat ==
This shrub grows in sandy soil, clay or loam on granite outcrop, hills and plains in disjunct places between Dumbleyung, Lake King and Narembeen, and near the type location, near Sinclair Soak, in the Avon Wheatbelt, Coolgardie and Mallee bioregions in the south-west of Western Australia.

== See also ==
- List of Acacia species
