= Merilup, Western Australia =

Town in the Wheatbelt region of Western Australia

- Town
- Interactive map of Merilup, Western Australia
- Coordinates: 33.28°S 118.29°E
- Country: Australia
- State: Western Australia
- LGA: Shire of Dumbleyung
- Location: 309 km (192 mi) from Perth; 84 km (52 mi) from Wagin
- Established: 1907

Government
  - State electorate: Roe
  - Federal division: O'Connor

Area
  - Total: 221.1 km^{2} (85.4 sq mi)
- Elevation: 311 m (1,020 ft)

Population
  - Total: 13 (SAL 2021)
- Postcode: 6352

Merilup is a locality in the Wheatbelt region of Western Australia, 309 kilometres (192 mi) south-east of Perth between Dumbleyung and Lake Grace just south of Kukerin. The construction of three schools was scattered for use within the area between 1922 and December 1950 when the final school was closed and consolidated in Kukerin's school. The population of Merilup live within private farm house dwellings scattered within the locality's boundaries, living and working on farms managing live stock and producing a range of broadacre crops. Today the area relies on the townsite of Kukerin, from which it shares a postcode, for essential services such as groceries and postage. At the 2021 census, Merilup had a population of 13.
