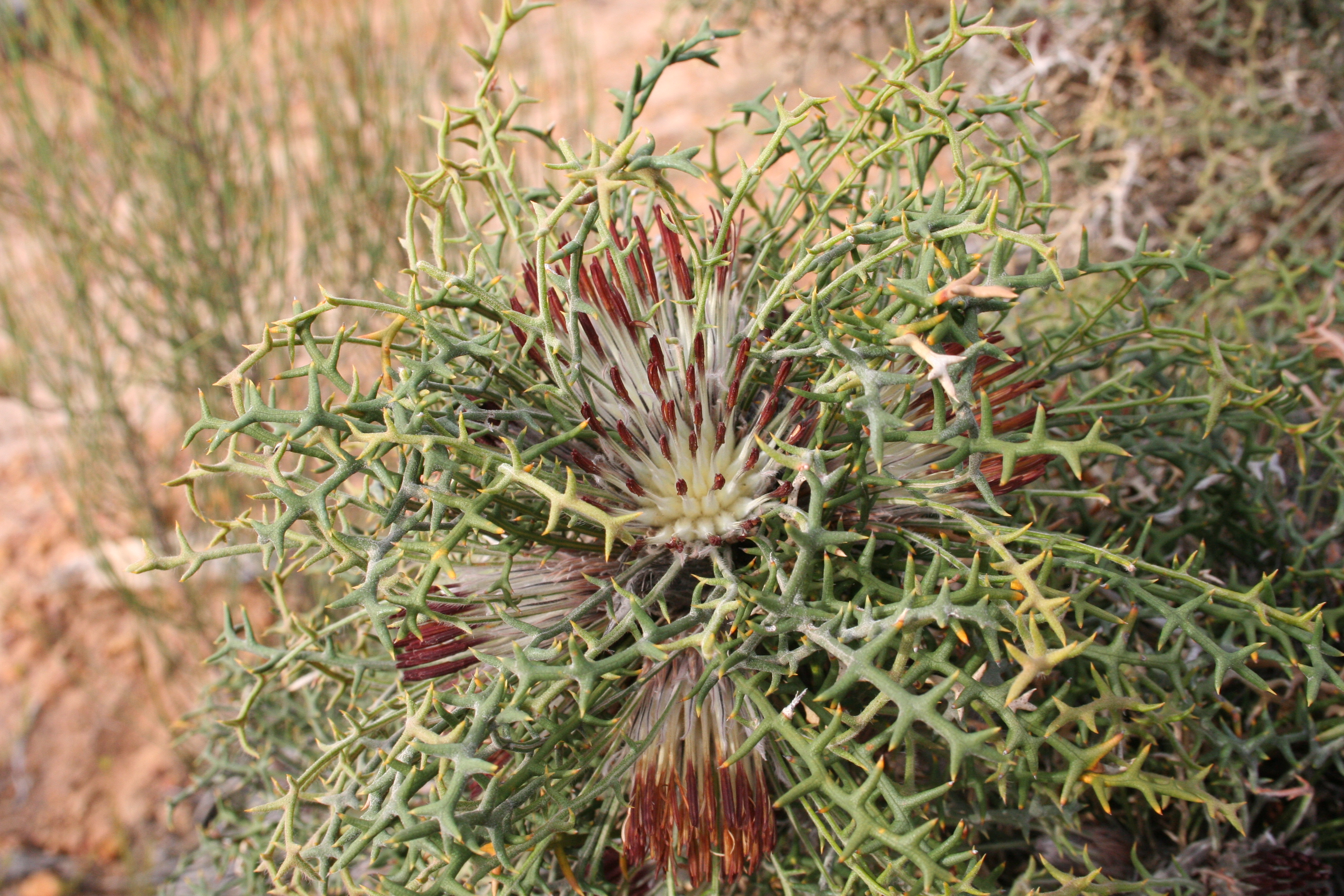
- Near Kondinin

Scientific classification
- Kingdom: Plantae
- Clade: Tracheophytes
- Clade: Angiosperms
- Clade: Eudicots
- Order: Proteales
- Family: Proteaceae
- Genus: Banksia
- Subgenus: Banksia subg. Banksia
- Series: Banksia ser. Dryandra
- Species: B. erythrocephala

Binomial name
- Banksia erythrocephala (C.A.Gardner) A.R.Mast & K.R.Thiele

Synonyms
- Dryandra erythrocephala C.A.Gardner

= Banksia erythrocephala =

Species of shrub endemic to Western Australia

Banksia erythrocephala is a species of prickly shrub that is endemic to Western Australia. It has erect stems, sharply pointed pinnatifid leaves, cream-coloured and reddish black or all cream-coloured and yellow flowers, and egg-shaped fruit.

== Description ==
Banksia erythrocephala is a shrub with erect stems that typically grows to a height of 1.7 m (5 ft 7 in) and forms a lignotuber. It has linear, pinnatifid leaves that are curved, 60–110 mm (2.4–4.3 in) long and 10–16 mm (0.39–0.63 in) wide on a petiole up to 30 mm (1.2 in) long, with between two and six sharply-pointed, linear lobes on each side. The flowers are borne on a head containing between fifteen and twenty-six flowers in each head. There are tapering linear involucral bracts up to 28 mm (1.1 in) long at the base of the head. The flowers have a dull reddish black and cream-coloured, or all yellow (depending on subspecies) perianth 23–40 mm (0.91–1.57 in) long and a cream-coloured pistil 22–36 mm (0.87–1.42 in) long. Flowering occurs from October to December or from January to June and the follicles are egg-shaped and 8–11 mm (0.31–0.43 in) long.

== Taxonomy and naming ==
This species was first formally described in 1928 by Charles Austin Gardner who gave it the name Dryandra erythrocephala and published the description in the Journal of the Royal Society of Western Australia from specimens he collected in 1926.

In 1996, Alex George described two varieties of this species:

- Dryandra erythrocephala C.A.Gardner var. erythrocephala that has a reddish black and cream-coloured perianth 32–40 mm (1.3–1.6 in) long;
- Dryandra erythrocephala var. inopinata A.S.George that has an all yellow perianth 23–28 mm (0.91–1.10 in) long.

In 2007, Austin Mast and Kevin Thiele transferred all the dryandras to the genus Banksia and this species became Banksia erythrocephala. The specific epithet (erythrocephala) is derived from ancient Greek words meaning "red" and "headed".

The two varieties described by George were renamed Banksia erythrocephala (C.A.Gardner) A.R.Mast & K.R.Thiele var. erythrocephala and Banksia erythrocephala var. inopinata (A.S.George) A.R.Mast & K.R.Thiele

== Distribution and habitat ==
Banksia erythrocephala var. erythrocephala grows in kwongan between Kulin, Nyabing and east of Hyden. Variety inopinata grows in kwongan and has been recorded near Dumbleyung, Kulin and Nyabing.

== Ecology ==
An assessment of the potential impact of climate change on this species found that it was likely to be driven to extinction by loss of habitat by 2080, even under mild climate change scenarios.

== Conservation status ==
Variety inopinata is classified as "Priority Three" by the Government of Western Australia Department of Parks and Wildlife meaning that it is poorly known and known from only a few locations but is not under imminent threat but var. erythrocephala is listed as "not threatened".
