= Country Women's Association =

Australian women's organisation

Country Women’s Association
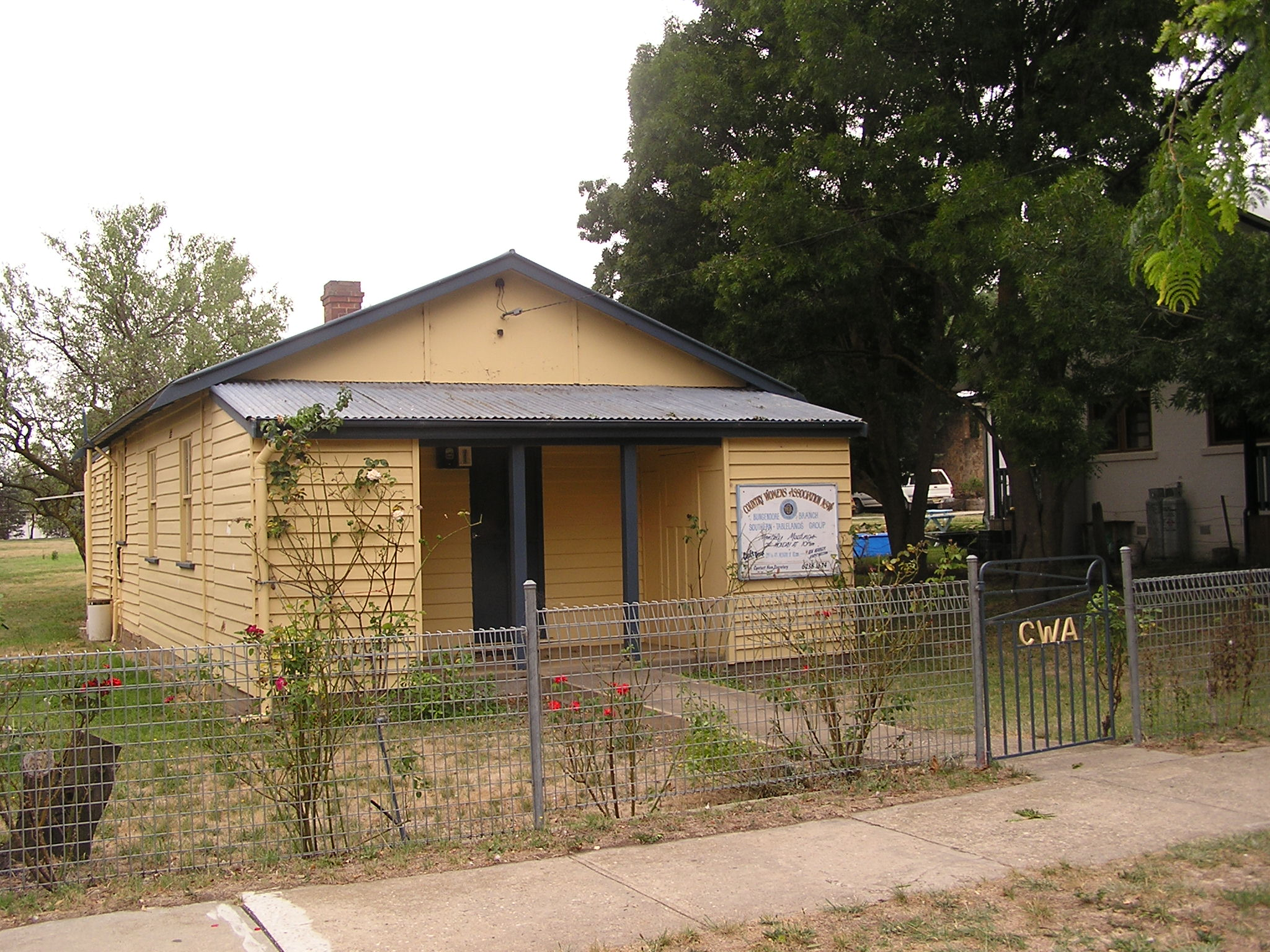
- CWA building in Bungendore
- Abbreviation: CWA
- Formation: 20 April 1922
- Founder: Grace Munro, Florence Gordon
- Founded at: Sydney
- Type: Not-for-profit organisation
- Purpose: To improve the conditions for women and children and make life better for families, especially those living in rural and remote Australia.
- Website: cwaa.org.au

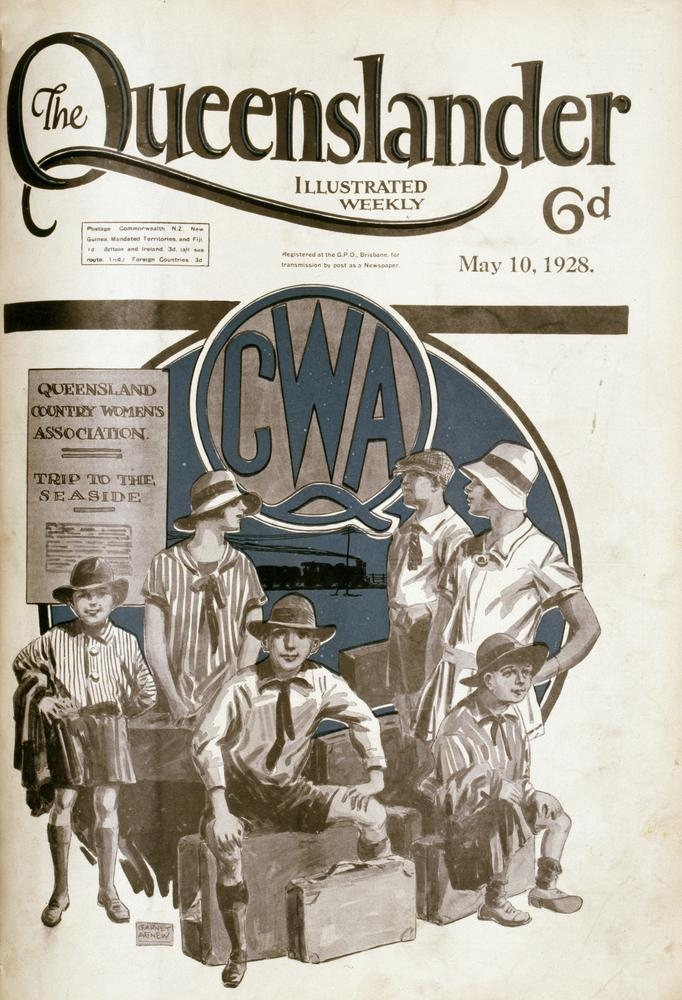
Illustrated front cover from The Queenslander, 1928

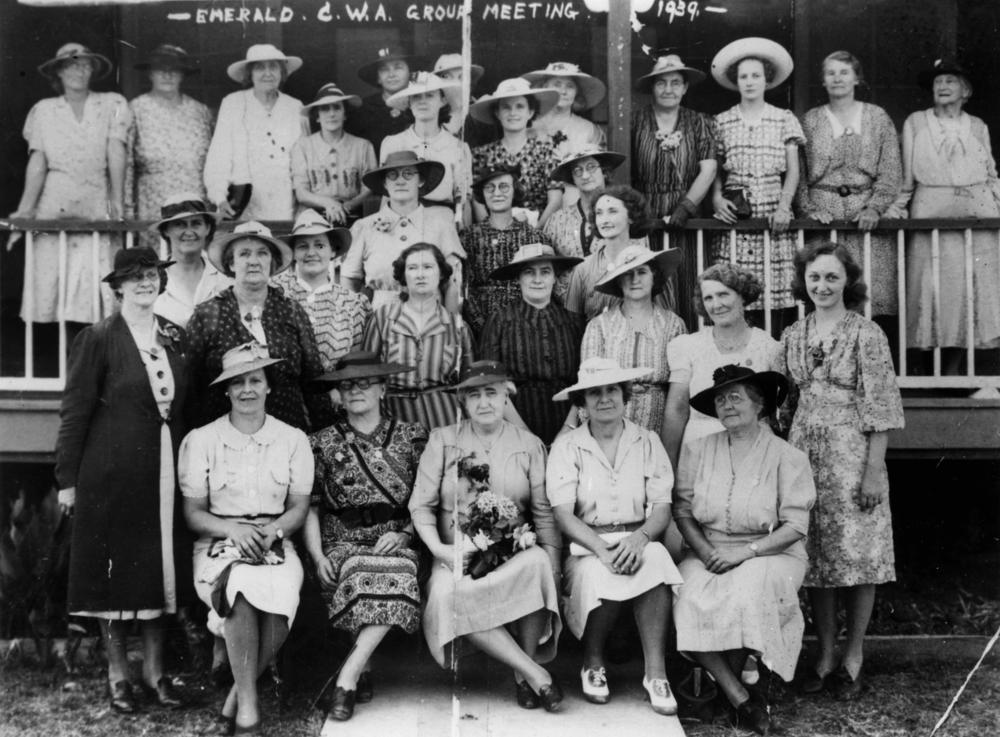
CWA group meeting in Emerald, 1939

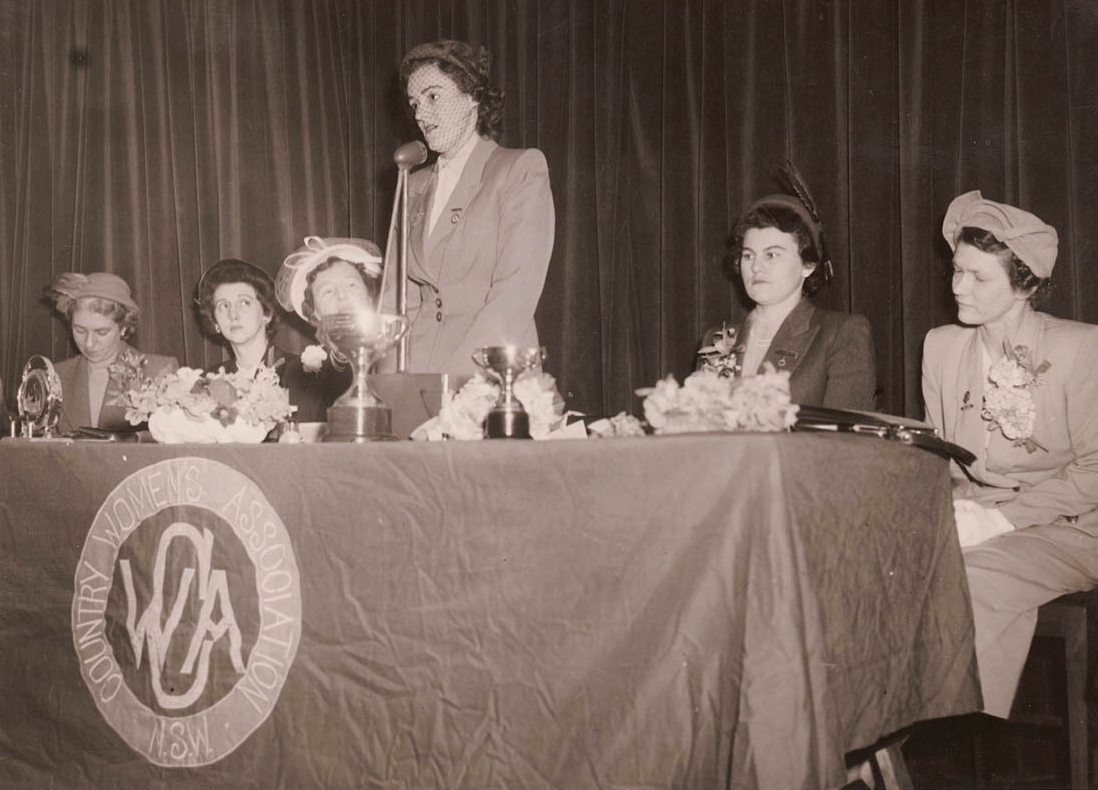
Country Women's Association of New South Wales meeting, ca. 1940

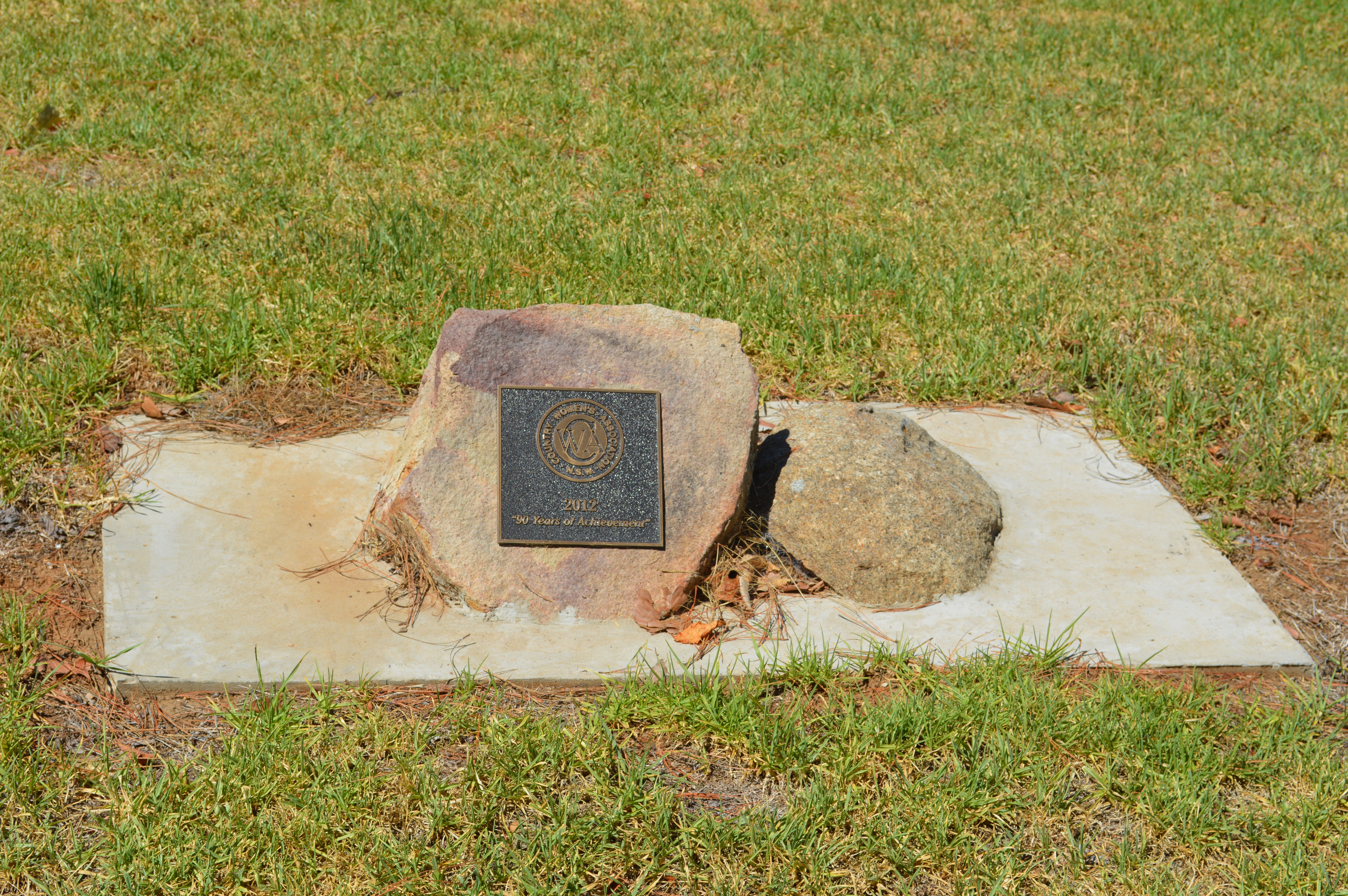
Cootamundra Albert Park CWA Monument

The Country Women's Association (CWA) is a women's organisation in Australia, which seeks to advance interests of women, families, and communities in Australia, especially those in rural, regional, and remote areas.

It comprises seven independent State and Territory Associations. Historically there was a national coordinating body, but this was discontinued in 2022 due to the availability of other communication mechanisms.

== History ==
=== Origin ===
The first Country Women's Association in Australia was formed on 20 April 1922 at the bushwomen's conference held in Sydney, that coincided with the Sydney Royal Easter Show.

The three-day conference (18–21 April 1922) was organised by a committee formed by the women's editor of The Sydney Stock and Station Journal, Florence Mary White Gordon (1860–1928), with the support of her newspaper, and, also, with the support of the Sydney social reformer, medical practitioner, and Member of the NSW Legislative Assembly, Dr. Richard Arthur. Arthur had first conceived the idea of the conference in 1919, because of his growing concerns about the poor quality of life and limited services available to women and children living in the country.

The conference was conducted under the patronage of Dame Margaret Davidson, wife of the Governor of New South Wales — who, accompanied by Helena Violet Alice Fraser (1874–1949), the Countess of Stradbroke, wife of the Governor of Victoria, opened the conference's proceedings on 18 April 1922 — and was chaired by Grace Emily Munro of Keera cattle station, Bingara, New South Wales, who was subsequently elected founding President of what became the Country Women's Association of New South Wales.

=== Growth ===
The Queensland Country Women's Association (QCWA) was formed five months later, in August 1922, at another bushwomen's conference held in Brisbane. Its founding president was Ruth Fairfax, who played a remarkable role in the development of the CWA in both Queensland and NSW, and the Associated Country Women of the World. The Country Women's Association of Western Australia followed in 1924. South Australia followed in 1926, initially as the "Burra Country Women's Service Association" with Mary Jane Warnes as its founder and first President. A metropolitan branch was formed in Adelaide in 1928. The CWA of Victoria was formed in 1928, and the first branch in the Northern Territory was created in 1933, with the CWA of Tasmania following in 1936.

=== Social and economic contributions ===
During the depression years, the CWA helped those in need with food and clothing parcels. During World War II, CWA played a significant role in supporting the war effort, establishing a reputation for being reliable at a time of national crisis. Members made tens of thousands of camouflage nets and sheepskin vests for the military, reconditioned uniforms, knitted and baked comforts for the troops, catered for troop trains and recreation huts, and established the first Servicewomen's Club in Sydney. In Sydney, they supplied volunteers on Mondays at the St Andrew's Cathedral recreation hut.

==== Recognition ====
On Wednesday, 30 September 1992, at a presentation ceremony conducted by the Governor-General of Australia, the hon. William George Hayden at Government House, Canberra, the Country Women's Association of Australia was awarded the Returned and Services League of Australia Peace Prize, in recognition of its outstanding efforts in promoting "the concept of international understanding and ... in so doing, ha[ving] made a contribution to world peace", and of its having "demonstrated the spirit of comradeship and selfless service embodied in the tradition of ANZAC".

== Princess Elizabeth and Philip Mountbatten's wedding cake ==
Princess Elizabeth and Philip Mountbatten were offered many cakes from well-wishers around the world for their wedding on 20 November 1947. Of these they accepted only 12, including one from the Country Women's Association.

They created a six-tiered wedding cake that stood 1.5m high. The tiers represented the six federated States, each of which donated ingredients. The finished cake was decorated with the Australian coat-of-arms on each side, plus sprigs of silver bracken fern, wedding bells and a spray of fresh white flowers in a silver vase on the top.

The icing, spiced with rum from Bundaberg, Queensland, was made by Charles William de Mars (1887–1966), the chief cake decorator at David Jones' Department Store, Sydney. de Mars spent eight days inlaying the four plaques of the Australian coat-of-arms at the base of the cake. It was baked in Sydney by the head chef at David Jones.

The six tiers were flown to London in separate airtight tins in October 1947, for the wedding the following month. At least one of the tiers was damaged en route when the plane carrying the cake landed at Lydda Airport (now Ben Gurion Airport) in Israel. The local police called in pastry chef Shaul Petrushka, who made good the damage before the cake continued its journey to London.

== Education, health and wellbeing ==
The CWA awards student scholarships; as well as providing instruction and encouraging participation in the fields of drama, art, music, public speaking, cooking and floral art. The organisation runs workshops for older members on how to use computers, electronic banking and ATMs. Submissions are made to governments at all levels on a wide variety of social issues. Despite the organisation's involvement in a range of issues and activities, the association with cooking, in particular scones persists. Seen as part of the local community in many parts of Australia, and its culture the CWA provides cross-generational support for women's, and children's, health and wellbeing.

== Property and funding issues ==
The CWA owns a range of properties built and maintained by members. In recent years there has been some controversy concerning the sale of the organisation's bush community halls. Due to CWA being entirely self funded, unlike men's sheds, some individual branches did not have enough members to continue paying for their upkeep, including council rates, insurance, electricity, water and maintenance. Nine halls were sold in New South Wales between 2003 and 2005, including halls at Cowra, Ettalong Beach and Jindabyne.

== CWA of Australia ==
The idea of creating a federal body bringing together the various State associations was first discussed in 1929, with the idea put on hold until 1945 when the CWA of Australia was formed at a meeting of State presidents in Melbourne. In the initial years, states took it turn about to chair the CWAA and host annual meetings. Victorian President Helena Marfell was elected first chair in 1945. South Australia and its president, Helen Withers, carried the mantle the following year and then, in June 1947, Bertha Mac Smith from NSW took on the role. From 1948 the changeover happened biennially.

The CWA in the Australian-administered Territory of Papua and New Guinea was given observer status at the national CWA conference in 1952, with the first branches having been established the previous year.

Over the years various changes were made to the constitution to make it more effective, while preserving the autonomy of member Associations. Significant change came in 1983, when new rules stipulated that the National President would be elected; in 1985 former NSW State President Dorothy Ross became the first elected president of CWA after a national ballot.

The CWA of Australia officially ceased to operate in early 2022, with the organisation explaining that this was (in part) as a consequence of increasingly enhanced avenues of communication, which meant a single point of contact was perceived to no longer be required. In a statement issued at the time, it said the member associations had increased capacity to advocate on the issues of concern to their members, however limited resources did not allow for duplication of this capacity at a national level.

== Queensland Chapter (QCWA) ==
The Queensland Chapter was formed on 11 August 1922 at Albert Hall, Brisbane. Ruth Fairfax was elected the first President. This chapter celebrated 100 years of continuous service in Queensland on 11 August 2022.

The first meeting of the Toowoomba branch was held at the Town Hall on 12 September 1922. Mrs Ruth Fairfax attended and spoke about the objectives of the organisation. The meeting resolved to hold a conference as soon as there were sufficient representatives to attend.

The Queensland chapter was inducted into the Queensland Business Leaders Hall of Fame in 2013.

In 2017, the QWCA created its own perfume, '1922', to mark its 95th anniversary. It was released at 2017 Ekka and was developed by Damask Perfumery in Brisbane. The artwork and branding of the bottle was supplied by Brisbane watercolour artist Michelle Grayson.

== Documentary ==
A 2007 ABC-TV documentary Not All Tea and Scones, written and directed by Carmel Travers and dealing predominantly with the NSW branch, has been released on DVD by Roadshow Entertainment.

== Gallery ==
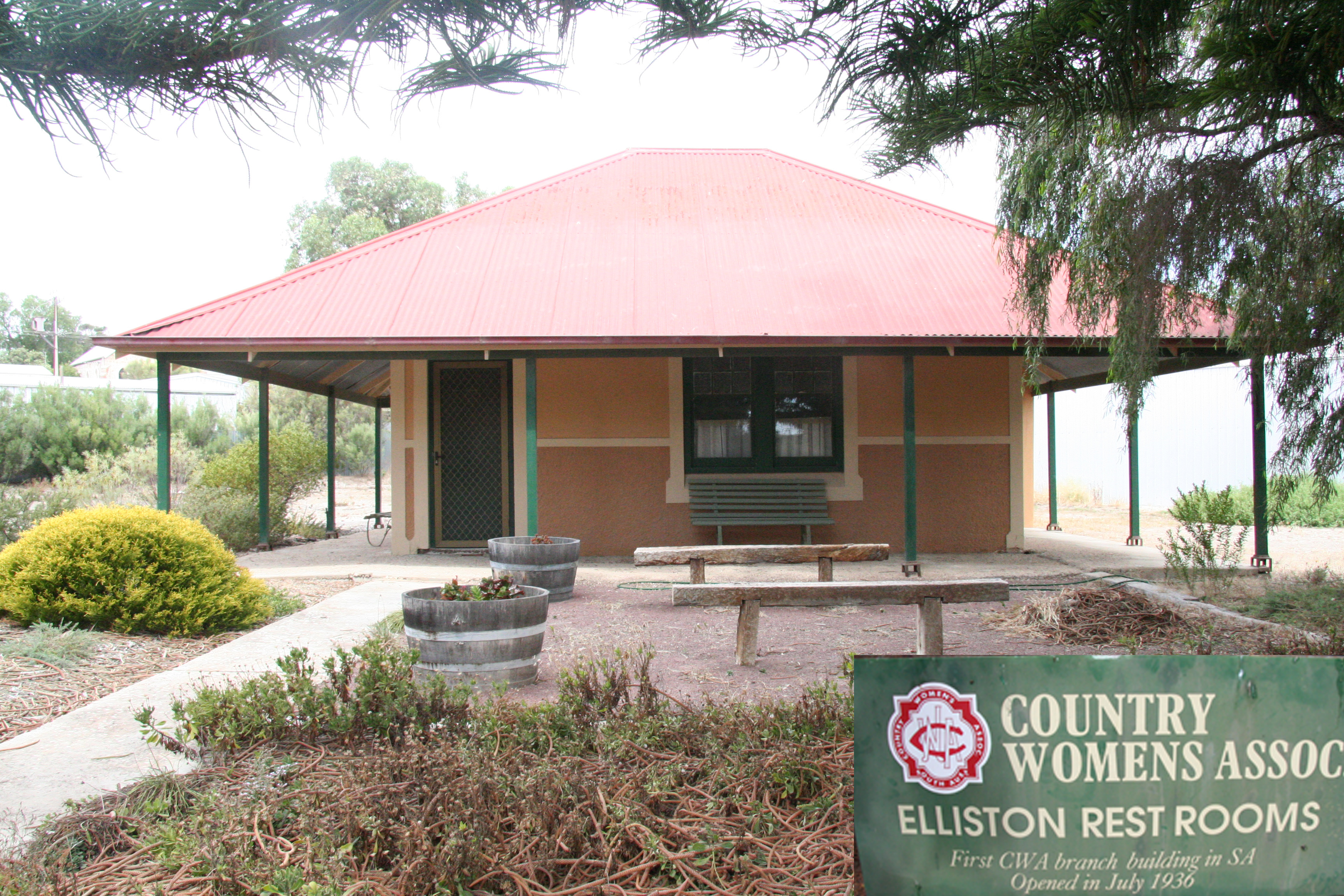
CWA building at Elliston, South Australia, first branch building in South Australia (1936)

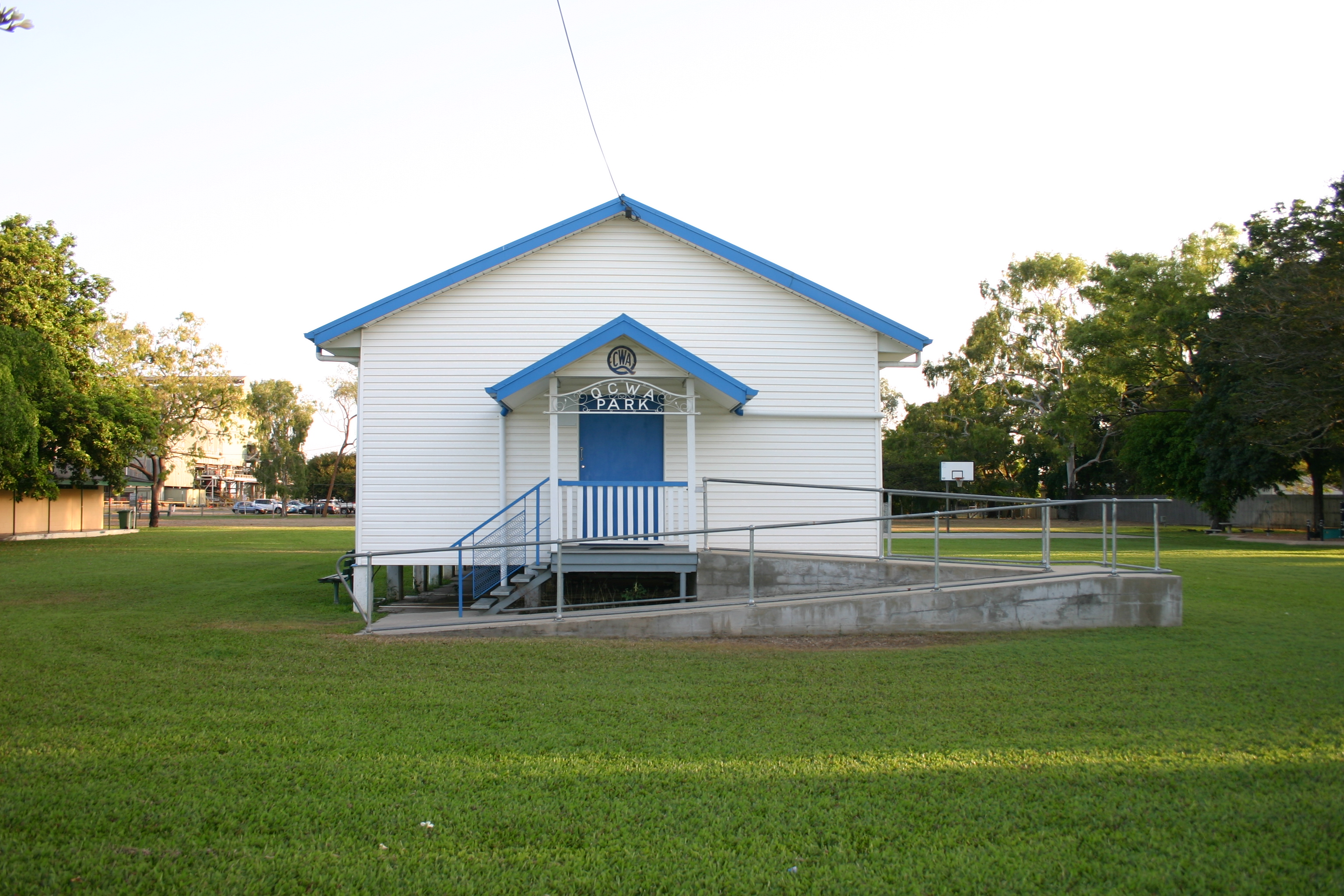
Giru, Queensland, 2009

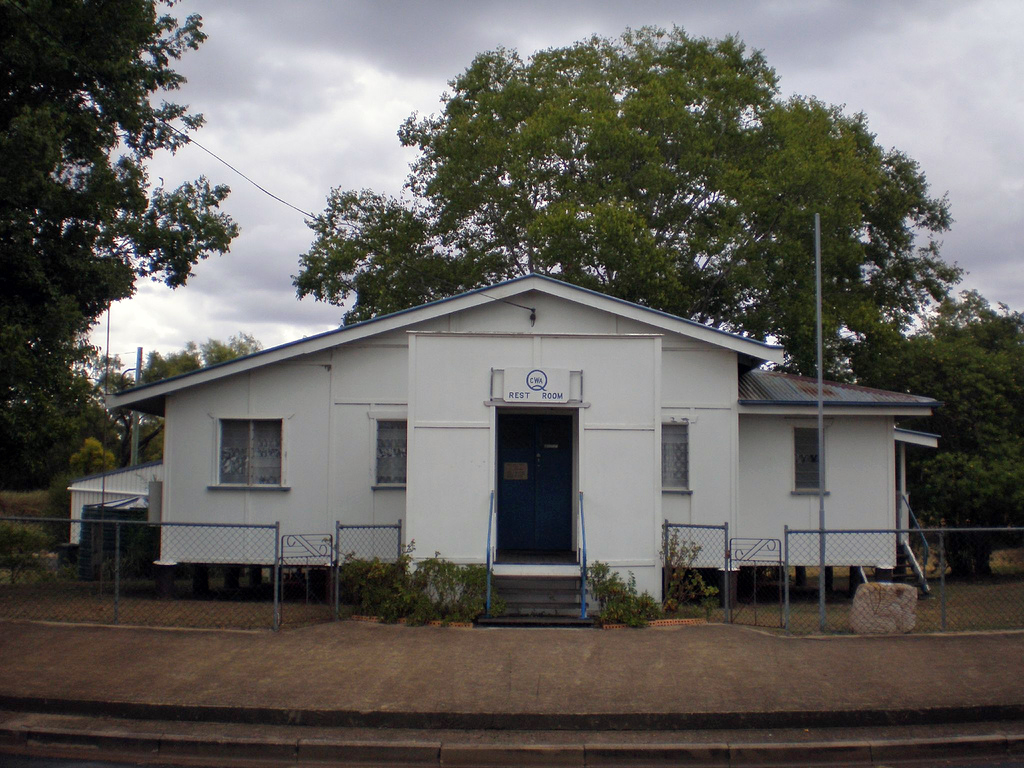
The Rest Room, Helidon, Queensland, opened 1957

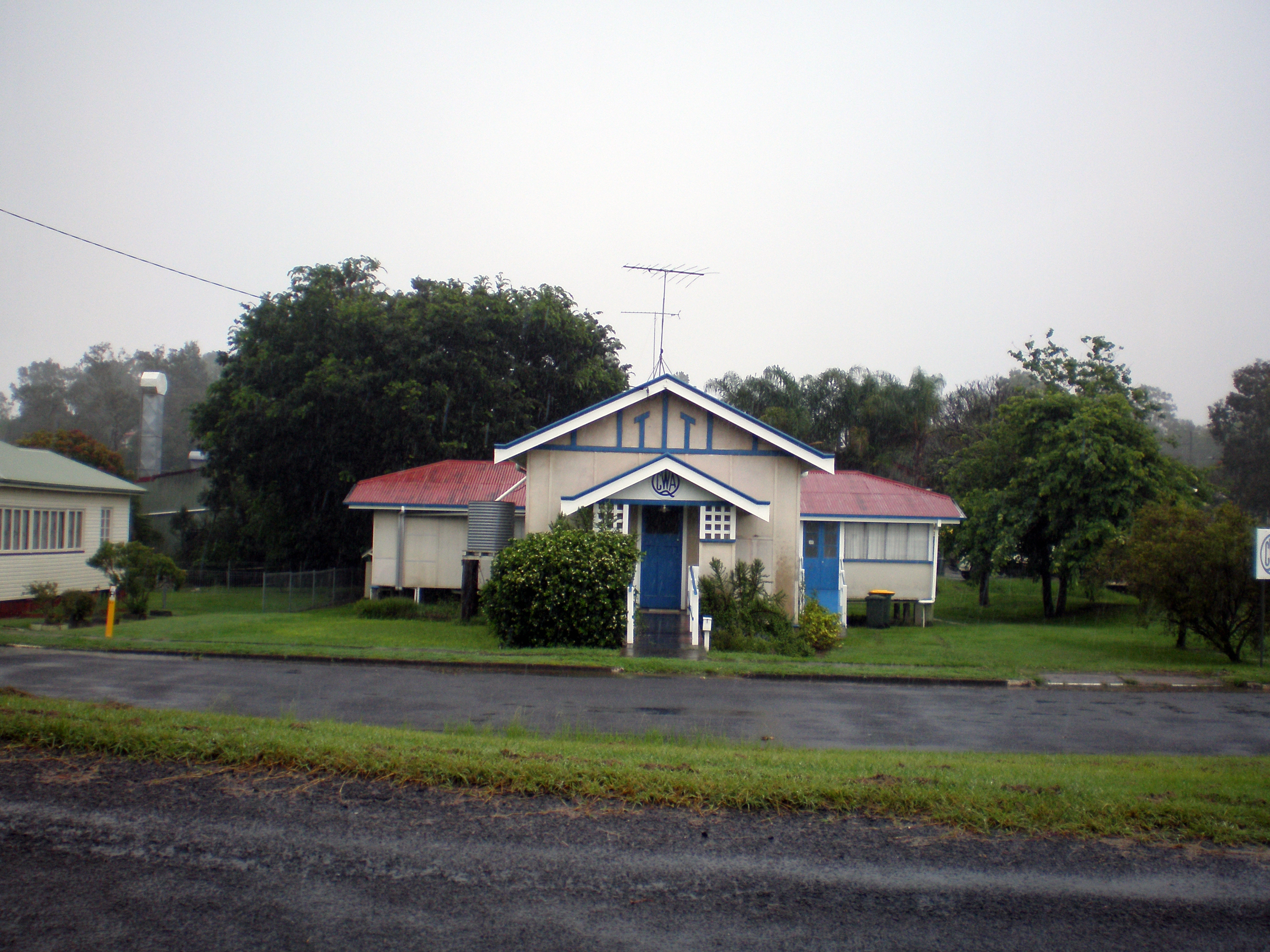
Kilcoy, Queensland, 2011

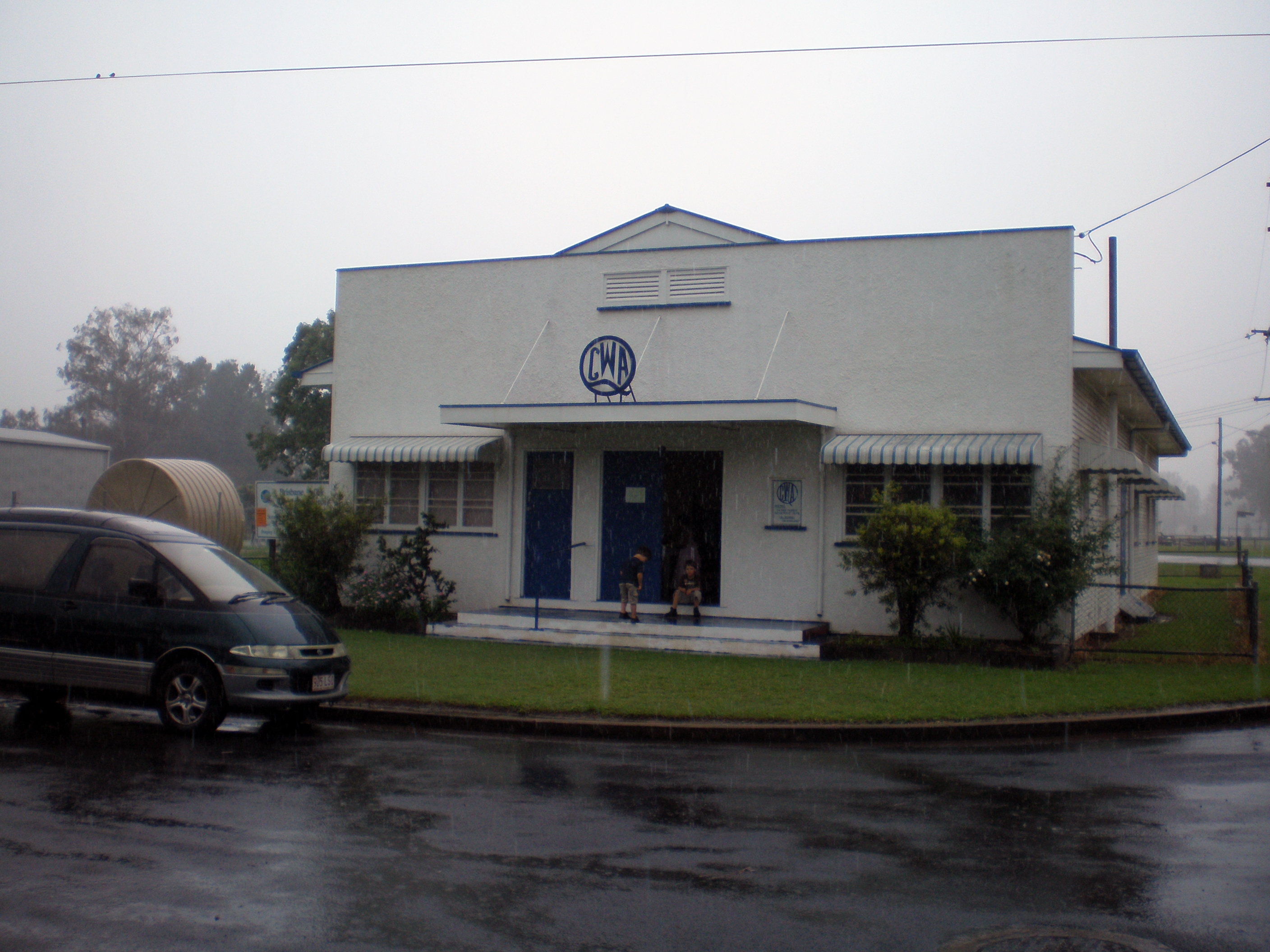
Esk, Queensland, 2011

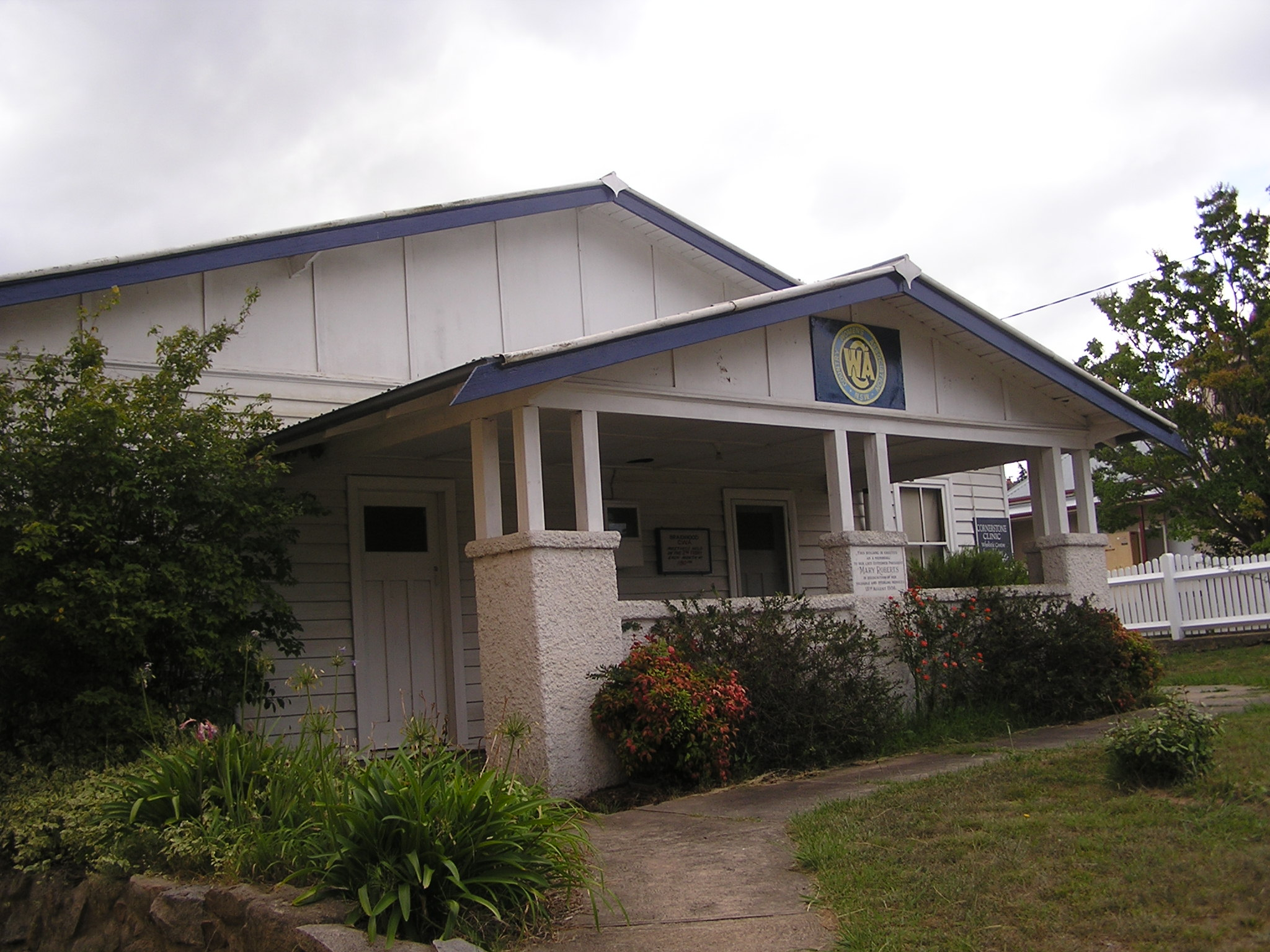
CWA building at Braidwood, New South Wales

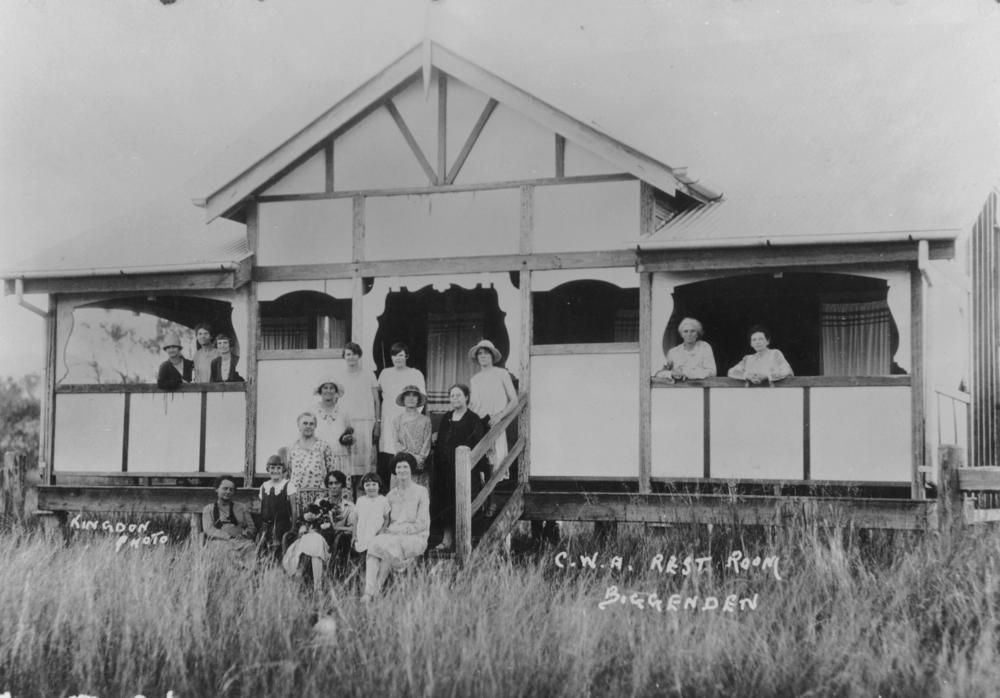
Queensland Country Women's Association Rest Rooms, ca. 1931. Biggenden, Queensland

== See also ==
- Associated Country Women of the World
- Feminism in Australia
- Taking Tea – a sculpture honouring the work of the CWA in Dumbleyung, Western Australia
