= Moulyinning, Western Australia =

Town in the Wheatbelt region of Western Australia

Moulyinning
- Town
- Interactive map of Moulyinning
- Coordinates: 33°13′34.7″S 117°55′38.3″E
- Country: Australia
- State: Western Australia
- LGA: Shire of Dumbleyung
- Location: 294 km (183 mi) from Perth; 68 km (42 mi) from Wagin
- Established: 1914

Government
  - State electorate: Roe
  - Federal division: O'Connor

Population
  - Total: 34 (2021 census)
- Postcode: 6351

Moulyinning is a small town located in the Shire of Dumbleyung, 18 kilometres (11 mi) west of Kukerin. Most members of the population live outside the town-site, living and working on farms managing live stock and producing wheat and other cereal crops. The primary features of the townsite include the Town Hall, primary school and a receival site for the CBH Group alongside the Newdegate railway line.
