= Helen Withers =

Helen Withers OAM
- Born: Mary Helen Campbell; 27 November 1907; Bathurst, New South Wales
- Died: 15 February 1986 (aged 78); North Adelaide
- Other names: Mrs Edwin Withers
- Known for: leadership of the Country Women’s Association
- Successor: Bertha Chatto St George Smith
- Spouse: Edwin Joseph Withers

(Mary) Helen Withers OAM, born Mary Helen Campbell, (27 November 1907 – 15 February 1986) was an Australian community leader who became the President of the Country Women's Association for South Australia and of the national organisation.

== Life ==
Withers was born in 1907 in Bathurst. She was the elder daughter of Annie (born Campbell) and James Walker and they had both been born in the state of Victoria, Her father was a squatter near Nyngan and by 1913 the family were living at what they called Kaluga. Her mother was in the Country Women’s Association of New South Wales and Withers was taken to meetings at Nyngan. When she was still at home she was went to a CWA meeting where she was elected to its executive committee. The youngest ever elected. In 1928 she became the President on the Nyngan branch.

She married into the Withers family in 1932. who owned substantial lands. Her husband was Edwin Joseph Withers and they lived on the edges of the freshwater lake of Lake Alexandrina about 100 km from Adelaide. They ran a cattle property belonging to the larger Withers family. She transferred her allegiance to the South Australian Country Women’s Association (SACWA). In 1939 she joined a new section of the South Australia organisation to appeal to women who could not attend regular meetings because if their remote locations. She was President of the South Australian Country Women’s Association postal section until 1952 except for when she was President of the SACWA.

Withers would sometimes use the name "Mrs Edwin Withers" and her husband sometimes accompanied her on visits to other clubs. She rose to be President of the South Australian Country Women’s Association from 1944 to 1947 at a time when there were moves to establish a national CWA organisation. Helena Catherine Marfell of Victoria was the first President of the National Country Women's Association. Withers was the next President in 1946 because South Australia was then taking the lead for another year until Bertha Chatto St George Smith of NSW took over.

Withers was awarded an OAM on 26 January 1981 for "community service". Withers died in 1986 in North Adelaide.
