= Bertha Chatto St George Smith =

Australian author and philanthropist

Bertha Chatto St George Smith OBE
- Born: Bertha Chatto St. George Sproule; 25 February 1892; Kew, Melbourne, Victoria, Australia
- Died: 30 December 1984 (aged 92); Orange, New South Wales, Australia
- Other names: Bertha Mac Smith
- Occupations: author, women's rights advocate
- Known for: President, Country Women's Association
- Notable work: Someday; The King Who Walked with God; Banjo and his Grandmother

Bertha Chatto St. George Smith OBE (1892 – 1984), also known as Bertha Mac Smith, was an Australian author and philanthropist. She was appointed an Officer of the British Empire in 1964, in recognition of her work as national president of the Country Women's Association of Australia.

== Biography ==
Bertha Chatto St. George Sproule was born in Kew, Victoria, Australia, on 25 February 1892. She was the seventh child born to her parents, James and Mary Brodie Sproule. Her father was from Ireland and her mother from England. The couple had eight children together.

As a child, Sproule attended an Anglican grammar school in Melbourne, where she served as school captain. She played tennis and was captain of the tennis team. After graduating from secondary school, she undertook a year of medical studies at the University of Melbourne. She never completed her degree, however. Her father died in 1912, and Sproule left university, moving home to live with her mother in Flinders, Victoria.

Sproule married Lancelot Machattie Smith, known as L. Mac Smith, a grazier from Boree-Cabonne, New South Wales. Their wedding was held at St. John's Church in Flinders, on 18 March 1915. The couple had six children together, four boys and two girls. One son died in infancy. After her marriage, Bertha was known as Mrs. L. Mac Smith.

Smith played a significant role as a leader in the Country Women's Association. The Country Women's Association of New South Wales branch was founded in 1922, one of the first two branches of the organisation. The goal of the organisation was to assist women in the countryside, many of whom were living in isolated areas with limited access to health care or other public services. In 1945, the organisation became federated at the national level. While some of the branches, including the Queensland branch, practiced racial segregation and excluded Aboriginal women, the New South Wales was less restrictive. The first Aboriginal branch in New South Wales was established in 1956.

Smith joined the Orange branch of the CWA of NSW, which was established in 1924, and she helped the organisation grow in the region. From 1937 to 1939, she edited the newsletter published by the state branch. In 1942, she compiled a collection of prayers entitled Someday, and donated the earnings to the Australian Prisoners of War fund.

At the end of World War II, she became state president of the CWA of New South Wales, and served a two-year term from 1945 to 1946. As president, she toured New South Wales visiting existing regional branches, and oversaw the foundation of several new groups in rural areas. She also purchased a building at the Sydney Showgrounds in Moore Park, where the Royal Easter Show and other major agricultural events were held, which allowed the CWA of NSW to operate a kiosk at events.

In 1947, Helen Withers term ended and Smith became national president of the Country Women's Association, serving a two-year term. One of her more significant contributions was advocating for a change in the wording of the constitution, which clarified that the organisation was non-partisan although it might engage in advocacy efforts related to women's needs. Smith encouraged the use of the phrase "non-party political" to make the distinction. She believed that women of all political parties and views should be welcome in the organisation.

In addition to her collection of prayers, she published several other books in her later years. She wrote about King George VI of Great Britain in The King who Walked with God, published in 1952. Her next book, By Love Serve One Another, published in 1953, focused on the reign of Queen Elizabeth II. She also authored a book about Andrew Barton "Banjo" Patterson, an Australian poet and author from rural New South Wales, who is most widely known as the author of the poem "Waltzing Matilda". The book was entitled Banjo and his Grandmother, and was published in 1964 for the centenary celebration of his birth.

She published Quench Not the Spirit in 1972, a text which details the history of merino sheep breeding in New South Wales. She also edited a collection of letters by John Maxwell, who was a noted agriculturalist and served as the Superintendent of Government Stock in New South Wales from 1823 to 1831.

== Honours ==
On 1 January 1964, Smith was appointed an officer of the Order of the British Empire, in recognition of her work as national president of the Country Women's Association.

== Death ==
Smith died on 30 December 1984 in Orange, New South Wales. She is buried in Cudal, New South Wales.

== See also ==
- Mary Jane Warnes
- Country Women's Association
- Associated Country Women of the World
