= Taking Tea =

Sculpture in Western Australia

- Artist: Phil Shelton
- Year: 2013
- Type: bronze
- Location: Dumbleyung, Australia; 33.31474°S 117.73999°E

Taking Tea is a sculpture located on the main street of the small rural town of Dumbleyung, Western Australia. It depicts an older woman pouring a cup of tea for a younger woman and honours the work of the local branch of the Country Women's Association (CWA), which was established in 1930 and disbanded in 2013. The aim of the CWA is to improve conditions for women and children and improve life for families, especially those living in rural and remote Australia.

The bronze sculpture was commissioned by the Dumbleyung CWA and paid for by funds from the sale of its building and land in 2006. It was created by artist Phil Shelton and based on archival photographs of Dumbleyung CWA members from the past. It was unveiled on 31 August 2013 at a ceremony attended by past and present CWA members from the area.
