= Shire of Dumbleyung =

Coordinates: 33°18′54″S 117°44′17″E

- Local government area
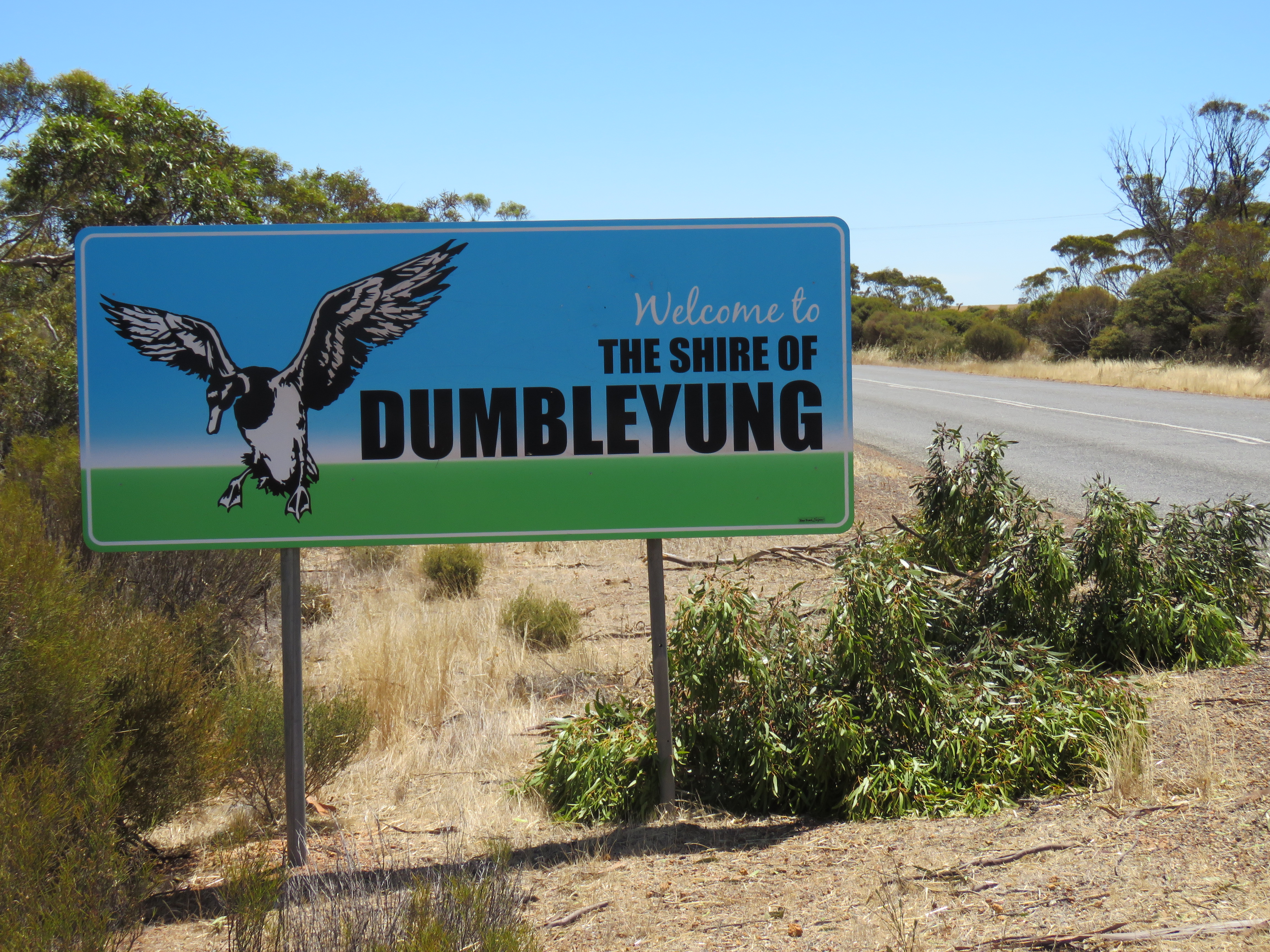
- Welcome sign on the Dumbleyung-Lake Grace Road

- Interactive map of Shire of Dumbleyung
- Country: Australia
- State: Western Australia
- Region: Wheatbelt
- Established: 1909
- Council seat: Dumbleyung

Government
  - Shire President: Julie Ramm
  - State electorate: Roe
  - Federal division: O'Connor

Area
  - Total: 2,540.1 km^{2} (980.7 sq mi)

Population
  - Total: 681 (LGA 2021)
  - Density: 0.27/km^{2} (0.70/sq mi)
- Website: Shire of Dumbleyung
LGAs around Shire of Dumbleyung
Wickepin	Wickepin	Kulin
Wagin	Shire of Dumbleyung	Lake Grace
Katanning	Kent	Kent

The Shire of Dumbleyung is a local government area in the Wheatbelt region of Western Australia, about 40 kilometres (25 mi) east of Wagin and about 275 kilometres (171 mi) southeast of Perth, the state capital. The Shire covers an area of 2,540 square kilometres (981 sq mi), and is involved in grain and livestock production and various biodiversity industries including cereals, summer crops, oil mallees, yabbies, emus, poultry and trout. Its seat of government is the town of Dumbleyung.

== History ==
On 1 October 1909, the Dumbleyung Road District was created. On 1 July 1961, it became a Shire following the enactment of the Local Government Act 1960.

== Wards ==
The President and Elected Members are elected by the local community to represent the interests and needs of the community. Council is currently made up of seven (7) Councillors representing the whole of the Shire of Dumbleyung district.

As of 3 May 2003, the shire was divided into 4 wards.

- Dumbleyung Ward (3 councillors)
- North Ward (3 councillors)
- Kukerin (1 councillor)
- South Ward (2 councillors)

Previously, there were 5 wards: Central (Dumbleyung), North (Dongolocking), South (Datatine), Merilup and Kukerin.

== Towns and localities ==
The towns and localities of the Shire of Dumbleyung with population and size figures based on the most recent Australian census:

Locality	Population	Area	Map
Bullock Hills	6 (SAL 2021)	128.6 km^{2} (49.7 sq mi)	
Datatine	18 (SAL 2021)	176.5 km^{2} (68.1 sq mi)	
Dongolocking	53 (SAL 2021)	277.7 km^{2} (107.2 sq mi)	
Dumbleyung	299 (SAL 2021)	254.8 km^{2} (98.4 sq mi)	
Kukerin	55 (SAL 2021)	4.5 km^{2} (1.7 sq mi)	
Merilup	13 (SAL 2021)	221.1 km^{2} (85.4 sq mi)	
Moulyinning	34 (SAL 2021)	222 km^{2} (86 sq mi)	
Nairibin	14 (SAL 2021)	146.8 km^{2} (56.7 sq mi)	
Nippering	21 (SAL 2021)	83.6 km^{2} (32.3 sq mi)	
North Kukerin	84 (SAL 2021)	318.3 km^{2} (122.9 sq mi)	
North Moulyinning	29 (SAL 2021)	172.2 km^{2} (66.5 sq mi)	
South Kukerin	20 (SAL 2021)	225.5 km^{2} (87.1 sq mi)	
Tarin Rock	36 (SAL 2021)	308.4 km^{2} (119.1 sq mi)	

== Population ==
Historical population

Year	Pop.	±% p.a.
1911	929	—
1921	1,689	+6.16%
1933	1,610	−0.40%
1947	1,246	−1.81%
1954	1,493	+2.62%
1961	1,444	−0.48%
1966	1,458	+0.19%
1971	1,221	−3.49%
1976	1,038	−3.20%

Year	Pop.	±% p.a.
1981	1,009	−0.57%
1986	1,021	+0.24%
1991	856	−3.46%
1996	834	−0.52%
2001	701	−3.41%
2006	632	−2.05%
2016	671	+0.60%
2021	681	+0.30%

== Heritage-listed places ==
As of 2023, 57 places are heritage-listed in the Shire of Dumbleyung, of which none are on the State Register of Heritage Places.
