= Nairibin, Western Australia =

Town in the Wheatbelt region of Western Australia

Nairibin
- Town
- Interactive map of Nairibin
- Coordinates: 33.2°S 117.56°E
- Country: Australia
- State: Western Australia
- LGA: Shire of Dumbleyung
- Location: 248 km (154 mi) from Perth; 55 km (34 mi) from Wagin
- Established: 1906

Government
  - State electorate: Roe
  - Federal division: O'Connor

Area
  - Total: 146.8 km^{2} (56.7 sq mi)

Population
  - Total: 14 (SAL 2021)
- Postcode: 6350

Nairibin is a locality in the Wheatbelt region of Western Australia within the Shire of Dumbleyung.

The population of Nairibin live within private farm house dwellings scattered within the locality's boundaries, living and working on farms managing live stock and producing a range of broadacre crops.

== Climate ==
Climate data for Nairibin (Dumbleyung)(climate data: 1910–2025)
Month	Jan	Feb	Mar	Apr	May	Jun	Jul	Aug	Sep	Oct	Nov	Dec	Year
Average rainfall mm (inches)	13.0 (0.51)	18.1 (0.71)	19.8 (0.78)	27.4 (1.08)	46.5 (1.83)	57.6 (2.27)	57.0 (2.24)	47.5 (1.87)	34.2 (1.35)	26.9 (1.06)	20.2 (0.80)	14.8 (0.58)	391.7 (15.42)
Source: Bureau of Meteorology
