= Nippering, Western Australia =

Town in the Wheatbelt region of Western Australia

Nippering
- Town
- Interactive map of Nippering
- Coordinates: 33.3°S 117.65°E
- Country: Australia
- State: Western Australia
- LGA: Shire of Dumbleyung
- Location: 270 km (170 mi) from Perth; 45 km (28 mi) from Wagin
- Established: 1872

Government
  - State electorate: Roe
  - Federal division: O'Connor

Area
  - Total: 83.6 km^{2} (32.3 sq mi)

Population
  - Total: 21 (SAL 2021)
- Postcode: 6350

Nippering is a locality in the Wheatbelt region of Western Australia within the Shire of Dumbleyung.

The population of Nippering live within private farm house dwellings scattered within the locality's boundaries, living and working on farms managing live stock and producing a range of broadacre crops. At the 2021 census, Nippering had a population of 21. Nippering was a stop on the Wagin to Newdegate railway line.

== Climate ==
Climate data for Nippering (Bunkin)(climate data: 1902–2021)
Month	Jan	Feb	Mar	Apr	May	Jun	Jul	Aug	Sep	Oct	Nov	Dec	Year
Average rainfall mm (inches)	11.9 (0.47)	17.5 (0.69)	18.0 (0.71)	27.1 (1.07)	47.0 (1.85)	60.3 (2.37)	59.3 (2.33)	49.7 (1.96)	36.3 (1.43)	25.9 (1.02)	18.4 (0.72)	13.5 (0.53)	384.9 (15.15)
Source: Bureau of Meteorology
