= Dongolocking, Western Australia =

Locality in the Wheatbelt region of Western Australia

Dongolocking
- Town
- Interactive map of Dongolocking
- Coordinates: 33°08′18.1″S 117°47′56.5″E
- Country: Australia
- State: Western Australia
- LGA: Shire of Dumbleyung
- Location: 265 km (165 mi) from Perth; 49 km (30 mi) from Wagin
- Established: 1902

Government
  - State electorate: Roe
  - Federal division: O'Connor

Area
  - Total: 277.7 km^{2} (107.2 sq mi)

Population
  - Total: 53 (SAL 2021)
- Postcode: 6315

Dongolocking is a locality within the Shire of Dumbleyung, 49 kilometres (30 mi) north-east of Wagin. The population of Dongolocking live within private farm house dwellings scattered within the locality's boundaries, living and working on farms managing live stock and producing wheat and other cereal crops. The only remnants of the original townsite is the Dongolocking Hall, and the (disused) tennis courts, which is maintained and used for events such as annual Christmas social gatherings. The original hall was replaced in 1960 by the current town hall due to deterioration. The towns legacy can also be found in the town of Katanning where the original Dongolocking School Building was transported to for use on the Katanning Primary School site, where it is still used by the Education Department today.
