= Banksia erythrocephala var. erythrocephala =

Scientific classification
- Kingdom: Plantae
- Clade: Tracheophytes
- Clade: Angiosperms
- Clade: Eudicots
- Order: Proteales
- Family: Proteaceae
- Genus: Banksia
- Species: B. erythrocephala (C.A.Gardner) A.R.Mast & K.R.Thiele
- Variety: B. e. var. erythrocephala

Trinomial name
- Banksia erythrocephala var. erythrocephala

Synonyms
- Dryandra erythrocephala C.A.Gardner var. erythrocephala

Variety of shrub found in Australia

Banksia erythrocephala var. erythrocephala is a variety of Banksia erythrocephala. As an autonym, it is defined as encompassing the type material of the species. It was known as Dryandra erythrocephala var. erythrocephala until 2007, when Austin Mast and Kevin Thiele sunk all Dryandra into Banksia. As with other members of Banksia ser. Dryandra, it is endemic to the South West Botanical Province of Western Australia.
