= Country Women's Association of Western Australia =

Western Australian women's organisation

- Formation: 1924
- Founded at: Perth, Western Australia
- Type: Women's club
- Website: www.cwaofwa.asn.au

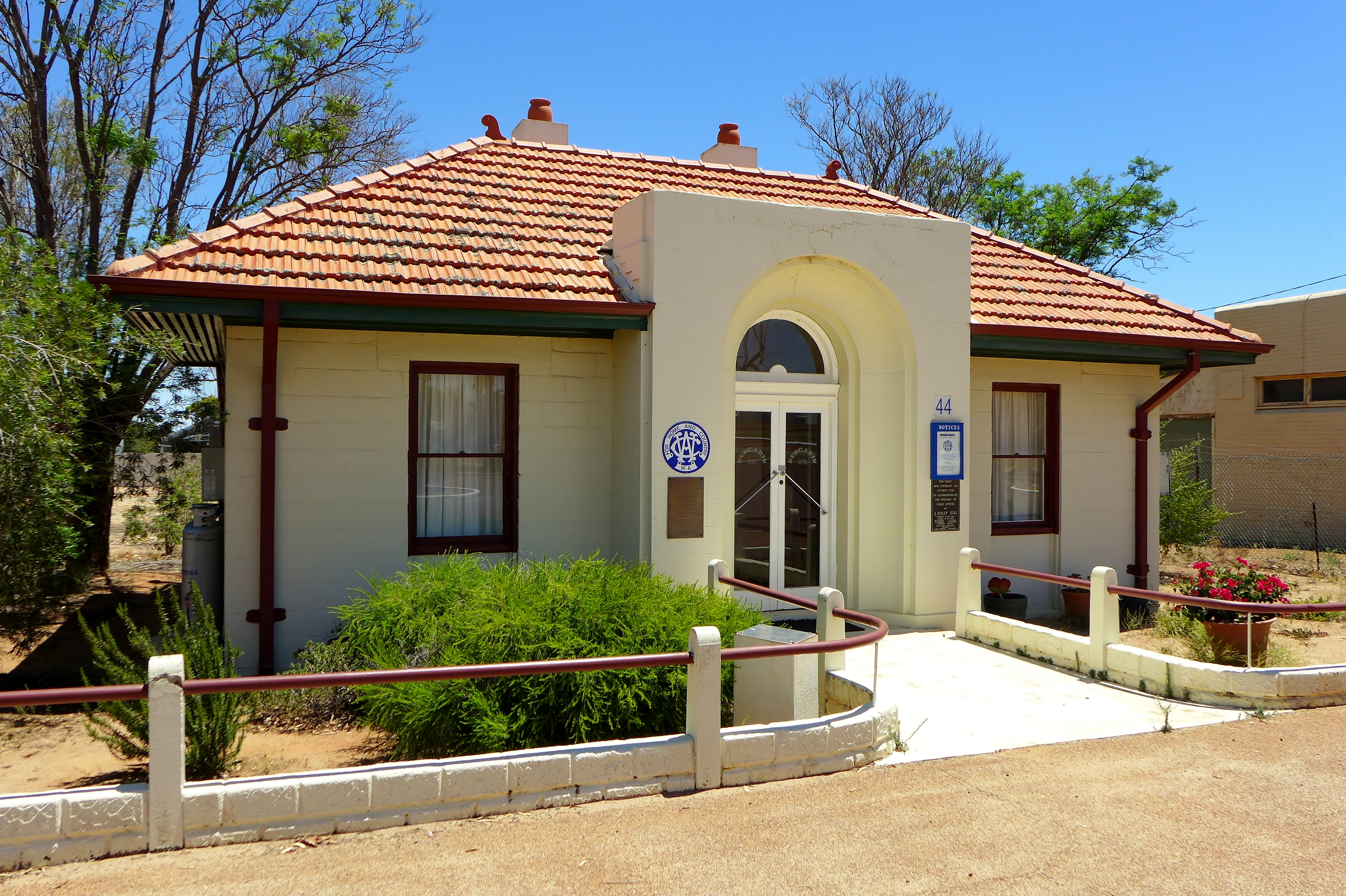
Alice Williams Memorial Building, Nungarin, 2014

The Country Women's Association of Western Australia (CWA of WA) is a woman's club in Western Australia. The first meeting was held in Perth in early 1924, and their first four branches were established the same year. Mabel Craven-Griffith was elected the first president at their first conference in 1925. It was part of the Country Women's Association (CWA).

The Association's purpose was "to improve the welfare and conditions of life of people everywhere, especially those living in the country, to foster friendship and understanding and to encourage co-operation and community effort". Their first priority was to establish rest rooms; located in the CWA of WA branches, these spaces provided a place for rural women and their children to rest and eat when they were in the town.

In 1934 the CWA of WA began publishing their newsletter The Countrywoman of Western Australia, which became a monthly publication in 1940.

Of note was the CWA of WA's participation in the war effort during World War II, establishing a war relief fund and participating in the Australian Women's Land Army.

Membership reached its peak in the mid 1950s with 12,000 members in about 250 branches.

In 2001 the CWA of WA left the national Country Women's Association, but remains active.

== Historic sites ==
Several heritage register listings recognize Association-related sites in Western Australia, including:

- CWA House Bunbury, on the State Register of Heritage Places
- Country Women's Association, Mullewa
- Country Women's Association Rest Rooms, Denmark
- Kojonup Road Board Office (The Women's Club)
- Northcliffe CWA Hall
- Pemberton Country Womens Association Hall
