= Kukerin, Western Australia =

Town in the Wheatbelt region of Western Australia

Kukerin
- Town
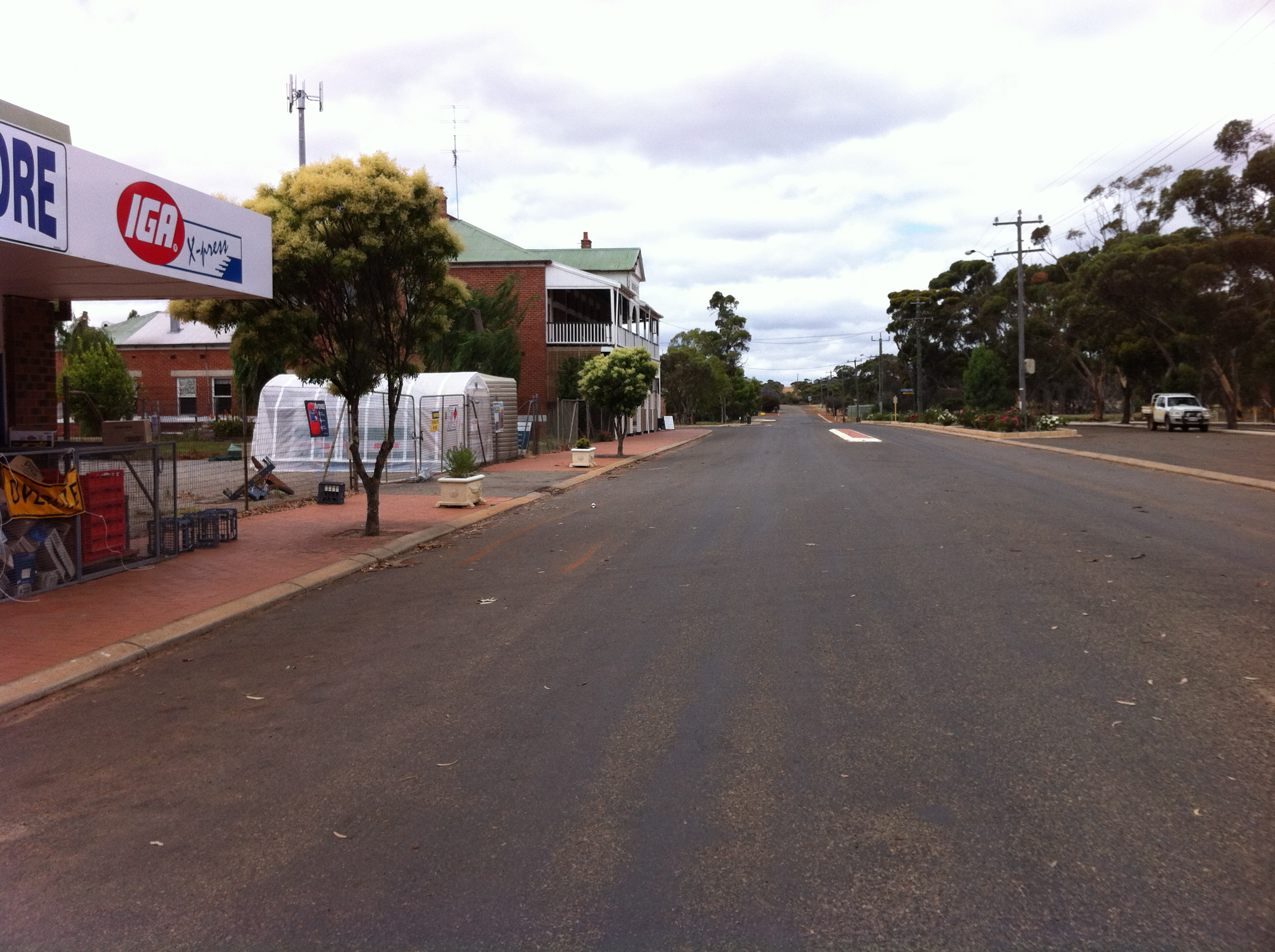
- Main street in Kukerin

- Interactive map of Kukerin
- Coordinates: 33.188°S 118.084°E
- Country: Australia
- State: Western Australia
- LGA: Shire of Dumbleyung
- Location: 302 km (188 mi) from Perth; 80 km (50 mi) from Wagin
- Established: 1912

Government
  - State electorate: Roe
  - Federal division: O'Connor

Area
  - Total: 4.5 km^{2} (1.7 sq mi)

Population
  - Total: 55 (SAL 2021)
- Postcode: 6352

Kukerin is a small town in the Wheatbelt region of Western Australia, 302 kilometres (188 mi) south-east of Perth between Dumbleyung and Lake Grace just off Dumbleyung Lake Grace Road on State Route 107. The town itself is small but services a considerable agricultural region in the eastern Shire of Dumbleyung. At the 2021 census, Kukerin and its surrounding areas had a population of 55.

== History ==
According to an official source, Kukerin's name is of Aboriginal origin, was first recorded as the name of a local soak and gully in 1908 and has also been spelled "Cookerin", but the precise meaning is not known. However, in local languages, words such as karkar mean "east", and the townsite is near the eastern edge of country traditionally owned by the Wiilman people. There is no evidence for a popular theory that the area was named after sandalwood cutters named "Cooke" and "Ring".

Until 1912, the area was known as Merilup (a name that now refers to an area to the south). In the 1870s, John Holland took up a pastoral lease of 9,000 acres (36 km^{2}) in the area and established a sandalwood depot. Sandalwood cutters opened up much of the surrounding area, and in 1904 the Rabbit-Proof Fence was built near the town.

In 1912, the town was gazetted when it became the terminus of an extension of the Wagin to Dumbleyung railway line in 1912. The primary school and hall were built in 1914, and Kukerin Hotel began trading in 1928—all are still open to this day.

== Present day ==
Kukerin is largely an agricultural town, with wheat and sheep farming being the main occupations. The town contains a secondary receival site for Cooperative Bulk Handling and one of the state's three Bunge grain depots 9 kilometres (6 mi) west of the main town. It functions as a service town for the surrounding agricultural area, and contains a general store, primary school, hotel, newsagency/post office, and the Nenke Park sports fields. The TrachMach Fair used to be held with various vintage and modern vehicles on display. In recent years this has transformed into the Kukerin Creekbed and Burnout Competition, which is held during the King's Birthday long weekend and is hosted at Nenke Park. During this event a large screen is set up where the AFL Grand Final can be viewed.

Climate data for Kukerin (climate data: 1912–2020)
Month	Jan	Feb	Mar	Apr	May	Jun	Jul	Aug	Sep	Oct	Nov	Dec	Year
Average rainfall mm (inches)	16.1 (0.63)	18.5 (0.73)	20.8 (0.82)	25.5 (1.00)	48.1 (1.89)	58.5 (2.30)	57.6 (2.27)	49.5 (1.95)	35.8 (1.41)	27.0 (1.06)	19.9 (0.78)	15.0 (0.59)	396.4 (15.61)
Source: Bureau of Meteorology
